= 2026 Supercopa de España final =

Final of the 42nd edition of Supercopa de España

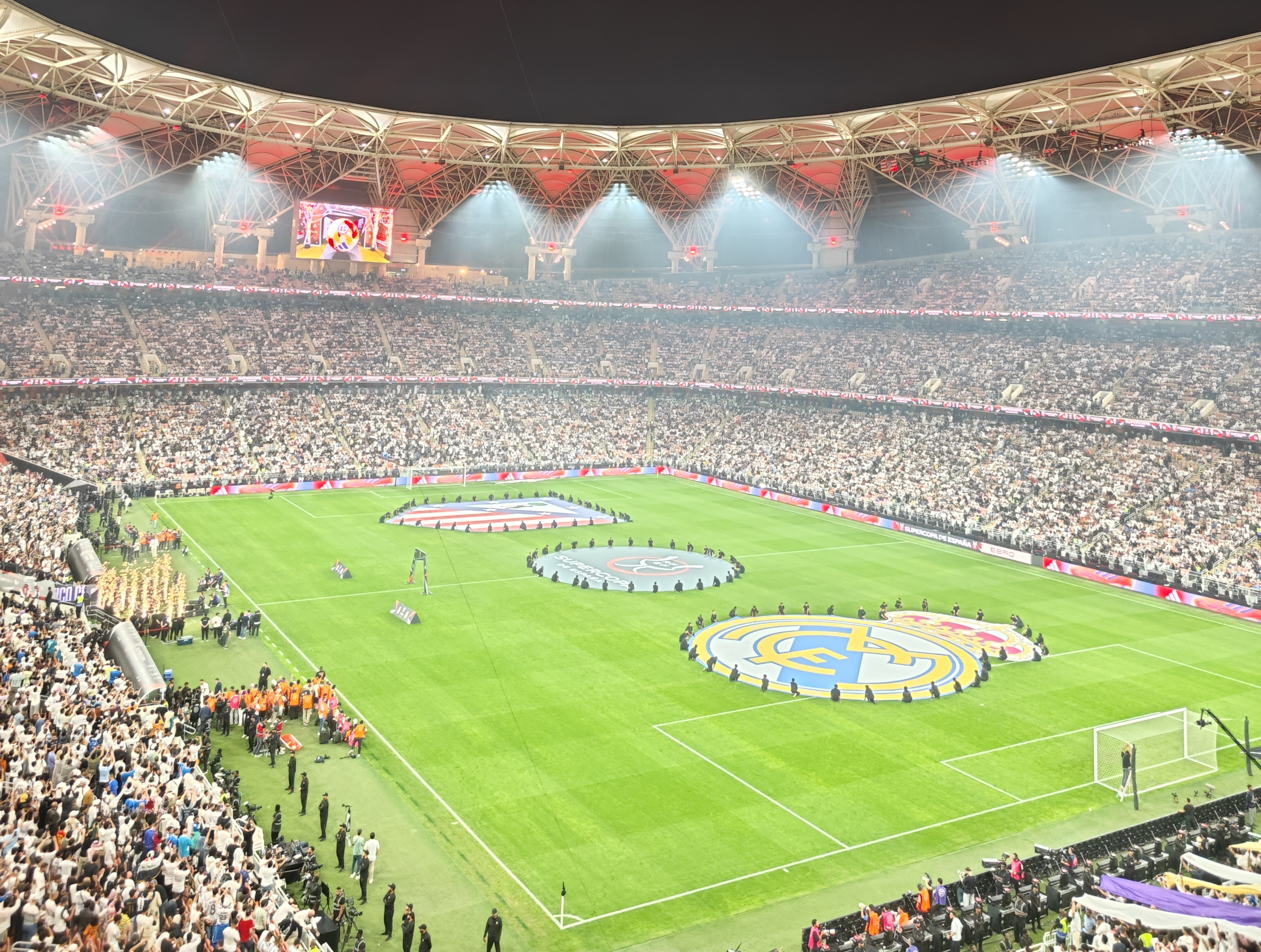
- The King Abdullah Sports City in Jeddah hosted the final.
- Event: 2026 Supercopa de España
Barcelona	Real Madrid
3	2
- Date: 11 January 2026
- Venue: King Abdullah Sports City, Jeddah
- Man of the Match: Raphinha (Barcelona)
- Referee: José Luis Munuera Montero (Andalusia)
- Attendance: 60,326
- Weather: Clear; 26 °C (79 °F); 57% humidity

The 2026 Supercopa de España final was a football match that decided the winners of the 2026 Supercopa de España, the 42nd edition of the annual Spanish football super cup competition. The match was played on 11 January 2026 at the King Abdullah Sports City in Jeddah, Saudi Arabia. It was the 'El Clásico' between the 2024–25 La Liga and 2024–25 Copa del Rey winners Barcelona—who were also the Supercopa holders—and both competition's runners-up Real Madrid. The clubs met in the competition's decisive tie for the eleventh time overall (until 2020, its format was simply a two-legged match); they also faced each other in the three previous finals.

Barcelona won the match 3–2 for their 16th Supercopa de España title.

== Background ==
This was the 263rd competitive El Clásico and the fourth consecutive in a Supercopa de España final; Barcelona won in 2023 and 2025, while Real Madrid won the 2024 final. This was the fifth successive meeting in the Supercopa de España for them, having also met in the 2022 Supercopa de España semi-final. Barcelona were aiming for a record-extending sixteenth title, while Real Madrid were aiming for their fourteenth title. Real Madrid won the most recent meeting between the sides, a 2–1 league victory on 26 October 2025.

== Teams ==
Team	Qualification for tournament	Previous finals appearances (bold indicates winners)
Barcelona	2024–25 La Liga and 2024–25 Copa del Rey winners	27 (**1983**, 1985, 1988, 1990, **1991**, **1992**, 1993, **1994**, **1996**, 1997, 1998, 1999, **2005**, **2006**, **2009**, **2010**, **2011**, 2012, **2013**, 2015, **2016**, 2017, **2018**, 2021, **2023**, 2024, **2025**)
Real Madrid	2024–25 La Liga and 2024–25 Copa del Rey runners-up	20 (1982, **1988**, **1989**, (Note: Real Madrid won the double in 1988–89, and thus were automatically awarded the Supercopa de España title for 1989.) **1990**, **1993**, 1995, **1997**, **2001**, **2003**, 2007, **2008**, 2011, **2012**, 2014, **2017**, **2020**, **2022**, 2023, **2024**, 2025)

== Route to the final ==
Barcelona		Round	Real Madrid	
Opponent	Result	2026 Supercopa de España	Opponent	Result
Athletic Bilbao	5–0	Semi-finals	Atlético Madrid	2–1

== Match ==
=== Details ===
11 January 2026
22:00 AST

Barcelona	3–2	Real Madrid
Raphinha 36', 73'; Lewandowski 45+4'	Report	Vinícius 45+2'; G. García 45+6'

King Abdullah Sports City, Jeddah
Attendance: 60,326
Referee: José Luis Munuera Montero (Andalusia)

**Barcelona**	**Real Madrid**

GK	13	(Spain) Joan García
RB	23	(France) Jules Koundé
CB	5	(Spain) Pau Cubarsí
CB	24	(Spain) Eric García	(yellow card) 57'	(substituted off) 83'
LB	3	(Spain) Alejandro Balde
CM	21	(Netherlands) Frenkie de Jong (c)	(red card) 90+1'
CM	8	(Spain) Pedri	(yellow card) 86'
RW	10	(Spain) Lamine Yamal		(substituted off) 90+3'
AM	16	(Spain) Fermín López		(substituted off) 66'
LW	11	(Brazil) Raphinha		(substituted off) 83'
CF	9	(Poland) Robert Lewandowski		(substituted off) 66'
Substitutes:
GK	1	(Germany) Marc-André ter Stegen
GK	25	(Poland) Wojciech Szczęsny
DF	4	(Uruguay) Ronald Araújo		(substituted on) 90+3'
DF	18	(Spain) Gerard Martín		(substituted on) 83'
MF	17	(Spain) Marc Casadó
MF	20	(Spain) Dani Olmo		(substituted on) 66'
MF	22	(Spain) Marc Bernal
MF	43	(Spain) Tommy Marqués
FW	7	(Spain) Ferran Torres		(substituted on) 66'
FW	14	(England) Marcus Rashford		(substituted on) 83'
FW	19	(Sweden) Roony Bardghji
Manager:
(Germany) Hansi Flick

GK	1	(Belgium) Thibaut Courtois
RB	8	(Uruguay) Federico Valverde (c)	(yellow card) 59'	(substituted off) 67'
CB	17	(Spain) Raúl Asencio	(yellow card) 57'
CB	24	(Spain) Dean Huijsen		(substituted off) 76'
LB	18	(Spain) Álvaro Carreras	(yellow card) 82'
CM	6	(France) Eduardo Camavinga		(substituted off) 84'
CM	14	(France) Aurélien Tchouaméni
CM	5	(England) Jude Bellingham
RF	11	(Brazil) Rodrygo
CF	16	(Spain) Gonzalo García		(substituted off) 76'
LF	7	(Brazil) Vinícius Júnior		(substituted off) 82'
Substitutes:
GK	13	(Ukraine) Andriy Lunin
DF	2	(Spain) Dani Carvajal
DF	4	(Austria) David Alaba		(substituted on) 76'
DF	20	(Spain) Fran García
DF	22	(Germany) Antonio Rüdiger
DF	35	(Spain) David Jiménez
MF	15	(Turkey) Arda Güler		(substituted on) 67'
MF	19	(Spain) Dani Ceballos		(substituted on) 84'
MF	45	(Spain) Thiago Pitarch
FW	10	(France) Kylian Mbappé		(substituted on) 76'
FW	30	(Argentina) Franco Mastantuono		(substituted on) 82'
Manager:
(Spain) Xabi Alonso

Man of the Match:
Raphinha (Barcelona)

Assistant referees:
Íñigo Prieto López de Cerain (Navarre)
Antonio Ramón Martínez Moreno (Andalusia)
Fourth official:
Adrián Cordero Vega (Cantabria)
Reserve assistant referee:
Adrián Díaz (Galicia)
Video assistant referee:
Daniel Jesus Trujillo Suarez (Canary Islands)
Assistant video assistant referees:
David Gálvez Rascón (Community of Madrid)
Víctor García Verdura (Catalonia)

**Match rules**

- 90 minutes
- Penalty shoot-out if scores level
- Maximum of eleven named substitutes
- Maximum of five substitutions
- Maximum of three substitution opportunities

== See also ==
- 2025–26 FC Barcelona season
- 2025–26 Real Madrid CF season
