= 2025–26 FC Barcelona season =

127th season of FC Barcelona

Barcelona
2025–26 season
- President: Joan Laporta (until 9 February); Rafa Yuste (interim) (from 9 February until 30 June); Joan Laporta (elect) (from 15 March)
- Head coach: Hansi Flick
- Stadium: Estadi Johan Cruyff (until 28 September); Estadi Olímpic Lluís Companys (until 21 November); Camp Nou
- La Liga: 1st
- Copa del Rey: Semi-finals
- Supercopa de España: Winners
- UEFA Champions League: Quarter-finals
- Top goalscorer: League: Ferran Torres; Lamine Yamal (16 each); All: Lamine Yamal (24)
- Highest home attendance: Camp Nou: 62,213 vs Real Madrid (10 May 2026); Estadi Olímpic Lluís Companys: 50,207 vs Paris Saint-Germain (1 October 2025); Estadi Johan Cruyff: 6,000 vs Como (10 August 2025)
- Lowest home attendance: Camp Nou: 38,439 vs Eintracht Frankfurt (9 December 2025); Estadi Olímpic Lluís Companys: 43,172 vs Girona (18 October 2025); Estadi Johan Cruyff: 5,711 vs Getafe (21 September 2025)
- Average home league attendance: 45,099
- Biggest win: Home: Barcelona 6–0 Valencia; Away: Mallorca 0–3 Barcelona
- Biggest defeat: Home: Barcelona 0–2 Atlético Madrid; Away: Atlético Madrid 4–0 Barcelona
Home colours	Away colours	Third colours

The 2025–26 Futbol Club Barcelona season was the club's 127th season in existence and their 95th consecutive season in the top flight. In addition to the domestic league, Barcelona participated in this season's editions of the UEFA Champions League (entering for the 22nd consecutive season), reaching the quarter-finals. They also played in the Copa del Rey, where they were eliminated in the semi-finals, and the Supercopa de España, which they won. The season covered the period from 1 July 2025 until 30 June 2026.

Barcelona had planned to return to their historic home, the Camp Nou, on 10 August 2025, following two full seasons away while the stadium underwent renovation and expansion. However, delays in obtaining an occupancy licence postponed the reopening, and the club eventually played their first match back at the stadium on 22 November 2025.

Barcelona retained the La Liga title on 10 May 2026, securing their 29th league championship with a victory over Real Madrid in Clásico. It was the first time in the club's history that they had clinched the title by defeating their rivals. Barcelona ended the league season with 19 out of 19 wins on home soil, becoming the first Spanish team in 40 years to complete a clean sweep at home and the first to do it under the 38 game format.

== Kits ==
- Supplier: Nike
- Sponsors: Spotify (front (Note: In October 2025, it was announced that the logo of Ed Sheeran's album Play would appear on the front of the jersey for the Clásico on 26 October. In May 2026, it was announced that the logo of Olivia Rodrigo would appear on the front of the jersey for the Clásico on 10 May.)) / AMBILIGHT TV (left sleeve) / UNHCR – The UN Refugee Agency (lower back)

Home
Home alternate
Away (Note: A collaboration between Nike and the Kobe Bryant estate, replacing the standard Swoosh with the Kobe Sheath logo to celebrate Bryant's admiration for the club.)
Away
alternate
Third (Note: The design features a bright mango-orange base inspired by the shirt worn by the club in the 2009 Club World Cup, with navy blue detailing on the collar and back.) (Note: The design draws on Nike's Total 90 designs of the early 2000s, featuring geometric piping across the front.)
Fourth
(2024–25 third)
2026 Home
Cup Kit
Goalkeeper 1
Goalkeeper 2
Goalkeeper 3
Mamba 1
Mamba 2
Total 90
Total 90 2

Training 1

Training 2

Training 3

== Season overview ==
=== Pre-season ===
On 3 June, Barcelona confirmed the departure of Álex Valle to Como for €6 million. Six days later, Clément Lenglet left the club following the termination of his contract, subsequently joining Atlético Madrid.

On 16 June, Barcelona announced their pre-season tour in Japan and South Korea, respectively, with three friendly matches. In Japan, against Vissel Kobe in Kobe on 27 July; in South Korea, against FC Seoul in Seoul on 31 July, and Daegu FC in Daegu on 4 August.

On 18 June, Barcelona announced the signing of Joan Garcia from local rival Espanyol by activating the release clause of €25 million, and signing the player to a six-year contract. Two days later, Aleix Garrido departed for Eibar on a free transfer.

On 30 June, Sergi Domínguez was sold to Dinamo Zagreb for €1.2 million. The following day, Barcelona loaned Ander Astralaga and Ansu Fati to Granada and Monaco respectively. Noah Darvich departed for Stuttgart for €2.2 million, while Pau Prim left on a free transfer to Al Sadd.

On 14 July, Barcelona signed Swedish winger Roony Bardghji from Copenhagen on a four-year contract for €2.5 million with performance-based add-ons. On the same day, Pablo Torre was sold to Mallorca for €5 million. The next day, goalkeeper Áron Yaakobishvili was loaned to Andorra for the season.

On 23 July, Barcelona secured the season-long loan of English international forward Marcus Rashford from Manchester United. The deal includes an option to purchase the player at the end of the season. Two days later, Pau Víctor left for Braga for €12 million.

On 27 July, Barcelona opened their pre-season tour with a 1–3 win away against Vissel Kobe, with goals from Eric García, Roony Bardghji, and Dro Fernández. Four days later, Barcelona thrashed FC Seoul 3–7, with a brace apiece from Lamine Yamal and Ferran Torres, and further goals from Robert Lewandowski, Andreas Christensen, and Gavi.

=== August ===
On 4 August, Barcelona closed out their Asia tour with a 0–5 win over Daegu FC, with a brace from Gavi and goals from Lewandowski, Dro Fernández, and Marcus Rashford. Three days later, Barcelona announced the temporary suspension as captain of goalkeeper Marc-André ter Stegen as a result of opening disciplinary proceedings against the player. Ronald Araújo assumed the role during this period. The player was suspended as a result of his refusal to sign a consent form for his medical data to be sent to La Liga. Ter Stegen rectified his decision the next day, 8 August, and the club reinstated him as captain.

On 9 August, Iñigo Martínez left the club on a free transfer to join Al-Nassr. The next day, Barcelona celebrated the Joan Gamper Trophy at the Johan Cruyff Stadium to inaugurate their 2025–26 season. They faced off against Italian club Como, winning 5–0 with goals from Fermin Lopez (2), Raphinha, and Lamine Yamal (2).

On 15 August, Francisco Trincão was sold to Sporting CP for €11 million. The following day, Barcelona began their LaLiga title defense with a 0–3 away victory over Mallorca, with goals from Ferran Torres, Raphinha, and Lamine Yamal. The match saw first-team debuts for Joan Garcia, Jofre Torrents, and Marcus Rashford.

On 23 August, Barcelona managed to come from 2–0 down to secure a 2–3 win away at Levante UD thanks to goals from Pedri and Ferran Torres and a last-minute own goal by Unai Elgezabal. Four days later, goalkeeper Iñaki Peña was loaned to Elche for the season.

On 28 August, Jan Virgili departed for Mallorca for €3 million. Two days later, Barcelona were held to a 1–1 draw by Rayo Vallecano at the Vallecas Stadium, with Lamine Yamal converting from the penalty spot.

=== September ===
On 1 September, defender Héctor Fort was loaned to Elche for the season. Four days later, Oriol Romeu left the club following the termination of his contract, subsequently joining Southampton.

On 14 September, Barcelona marked their first home game of the season with a 6–0 demolition of Valencia at the Estadi Johan Cruyff courtesy of braces from Fermín, Raphinha, and Robert Lewandowski. The match saw Roony Bardghji make his first-team debut. Four days later, the Blaugrana got off to a winning start in their Champions League league phase campaign in a 1–2 away win over Newcastle United via a brace by Marcus Rashford — his first goals for the club.

On 21 September, a brace from Torres and a goal by Dani Olmo handed Barcelona a 3–0 home victory over Getafe in the league. Four days later, Barcelona defeated newly-promoted side Real Oviedo 1–3, with Eric García, Lewandowski, and Araújo finding the net. Barça then capped off the month with a 2–1 home victory over Real Sociedad at the Estadi Olímpic Lluís Companys with goals from Jules Koundé and Lewandowski. The match saw Dro Fernández make his first-team debut.

=== October ===
The month of October began poorly for Barça as the Catalan club suffered their first loss of the season on 1 October in a 1–2 home loss to defending Champions League holders Paris Saint-Germain despite an early goal from Ferran Torres. Rashford's debut league goal was rendered moot in a heavy 4–1 loss away at Sevilla four days later.

On 18 October, goals from Pedri and a last-minute winner by Araújo secured a 2–1 league win over Catalan rivals Girona FC in a dramatic match that saw Barça boss Hansi Flick sent off in injury time. Three days later, Barcelona steamrolled past Olympiacos 6–1 at home. Fermín scored his first career hat-trick assisted by Lamine Yamal, Roony Bardghji and Dro Fernández, with the other goals scored by Lamine Yamal and Rashford (2).

On 26 October, a Fermín equaliser was not enough to get Barcelona over the line in a 2–1 away loss against Real Madrid, handing the Catalans their first El Clásico loss since April 2024.

=== November ===
FC Barcelona’s November 2025 campaign began with a 3–1 domestic victory over Elche on November 2, followed shortly by a frustrating 3–3 draw against Club Brugge in the Champions League on November 5.

The team quickly regained momentum in La Liga with a 2–4 win away at Celta Vigo on November 9, leading into the most significant moment of the month: the historic reopening of the Spotify Camp Nou on November 22, where the squad celebrated their return with a dominant 4–0 thrashing of Athletic Bilbao. This high point was tempered by a difficult 3–0 Champions League defeat to Chelsea at Stamford Bridge on November 25, during which a first-half Araújo red card crippled their tactical approach. Ultimately, Barcelona salvaged their domestic consistency before the month closed, securing a final 3–1 victory over Deportivo Alavés on November 29 to maintain their perfect league record throughout the period.

=== December ===
Barcelona had a great month in December, winning all their games across La Liga, the UEFA Champions League and the Copa Del Rey. The run began with a 3–1 victory over Atletico Madrid at the Spotify Camp Nou on December 2nd with goals coming from Raphinha, Dani Olmo and Torres. This was followed by a thrilling 3–5 away win over Real Betis on December 6 with a hat trick from Torres and goals from Lamine and Roony Bardghji, the latter his first for the club.

The team then defeated Eintracht Frankfurt 2–1 in the Champions League with a brilliant brace from Kounde, before returning to La Liga to defeat CA Osasuna 2–0 with a brace from Raphinha. Then Barcelona started their Copa del rey campaign win 0–2 victory over CD Guadalajara with goals coming from Rashford and Christensen each on December 16 sending them through to the Round of 16 and closing the year with 0–2 away win over Villareal on December 21 to maintain their top position of the La Liga table.

=== January ===
On 3 January, Barcelona opened their league account for the year with a 0–2 win away against Espanyol at the Estadi Cornellà-El Prat, with goals from Dani Olmo and Robert Lewandowski.

On 7 January, Barcelona reached the final of the Supercopa de España in Jeddah with a 5–0 win over Athletic Bilbao in the semi-finals, with goals from Ferran Torres, Fermín López, Roony Bardghji, and a brace from Raphinha. Four days later, Barcelona won the Supercopa de España with a 3–2 victory over Real Madrid in the final, with a brace from Raphinha and a goal from Lewandowski.

On 13 January, Barcelona secured the loan of Portuguese defender João Cancelo from Al Hilal for the remainder of the season. Two days later, Barcelona advanced to the quarter-finals of the Copa del Rey with a 0–2 win away against Racing Santander at El Sardinero, with goals from Torres and Lamine Yamal. Three days after that, Barcelona were beaten 2–1 away by Real Sociedad at Anoeta, with Rashford scoring the visitors' only goal.

On 20 January, goalkeeper Marc-André ter Stegen was loaned to Girona until the end of the campaign. The following day, Barcelona secured a 2–4 win away against Slavia Prague in the Champions League league phase, with a brace from Fermín and further goals from Olmo and Lewandowski.

On 25 January, Barcelona beat Real Oviedo 3–0 at Camp Nou, with goals from Olmo, Raphinha, and Yamal. The next day, Dro Fernández departed for Paris Saint-Germain for €8.2 million.

On 28 January, Barcelona defeated Copenhagen 4–1 at home, with goals from Lewandowski, Yamal, a penalty from Raphinha, and Rashford. Barcelona closed out the month on 31 January with a 1–3 win away against Elche, with goals from Yamal, Torres, and Rashford.

=== February ===
On 2 February, young defender Andrés Cuenca was loaned to Sporting Gijón for the rest of the season. The next day, Barcelona advanced to the semi-finals of the Copa del Rey with a 1–2 win away against Albacete, with goals from Lamine Yamal and Ronald Araújo.

On 7 February, Barcelona officially withdrew from the European Super League project. Later that day, Barcelona beat Mallorca 3–0 at Camp Nou, with goals from Robert Lewandowski, Yamal, and Marc Bernal, the latter netting his first goal for the club. The match also saw Tommy Marqués make his first-team debut. Two days later, Joan Laporta and several members of his board resigned from their positions to contest the upcoming presidential elections, with vice-president Rafael Yuste assuming the role of interim president.

On 12 February, Barcelona were thrashed 4–0 away by Atlético Madrid in the first leg of the Copa del Rey semi-finals, with Eric García opening the scoring with an own goal before further strikes from Antoine Griezmann, Ademola Lookman, and Julián Álvarez. Four days later, Barcelona were beaten 2–1 away by Girona at Montilivi, with Pau Cubarsí scoring the visitors' only goal.

On 22 February, Barcelona returned to winning ways with a 3–0 win over Levante at Camp Nou, with goals from Bernal, Frenkie de Jong, and Fermín López. Barcelona closed out the month on 28 February with a 4–1 home win over Villarreal, with a hat-trick from Yamal and a late goal from Lewandowski.

=== March ===
On 3 March, Barcelona won the second leg of the Copa del Rey semi-final 3–0 over Atlético Madrid at Camp Nou, with a brace from Marc Bernal and a penalty from Raphinha, but were eliminated 3–4 on aggregate following their first-leg defeat. Four days later, Barcelona won 0–1 away against Athletic Bilbao at San Mamés, with Lamine Yamal scoring the only goal.

On 10 March, Barcelona drew 1–1 away against Newcastle United at St James' Park in the first leg of the Champions League round of 16, with Lamine Yamal equalising from the penalty spot in stoppage time. Xavi Espart made his first-team debut in the match. Five days later, Barcelona held its presidential elections, in which Joan Laporta was re-elected as president after defeating challenger Víctor Font. Later that day, Barcelona thrashed Sevilla 5–2 at home, with a hat-trick from Raphinha, including two penalties, and further goals from Dani Olmo and João Cancelo.

On 18 March, Barcelona routed Newcastle United 7–2 in the second leg to advance 8–3 on aggregate, with braces from Raphinha and Robert Lewandowski, and further goals from Bernal, Yamal, and Fermín López. Barcelona closed out the month on 22 March with a narrow 1–0 win over Rayo Vallecano, with Ronald Araújo scoring the only goal.

=== April ===
On 4 April, Barcelona won 1–2 away against Atlético Madrid, with goals from Marcus Rashford and Robert Lewandowski. Four days later, Barcelona were beaten 0–2 at home by Atlético Madrid in the first leg of the Champions League quarter-finals, with Pau Cubarsí sent off before half-time.

On 11 April, Barcelona thrashed Espanyol 4–1 at home, with a brace from Ferran Torres and further goals from Lamine Yamal and Rashford. Three days later, Barcelona won the second leg 1–2 away against Atlético Madrid at the Metropolitano, with goals from Yamal and Torres, but were eliminated 3–2 on aggregate after Eric García was sent off late on.

On 22 April, Barcelona edged Celta Vigo 1–0 at Camp Nou, with Yamal converting from the penalty spot. Barcelona closed out the month on 25 April with a 0–2 win away against Getafe at the Coliseum, with goals from Fermín López and Rashford.

=== May ===
On 2 May, Barcelona won 1–2 away against Osasuna at El Sadar, with goals from Robert Lewandowski and Ferran Torres.

On 10 May, Barcelona beat Real Madrid 2–0 at Camp Nou, with goals from Marcus Rashford and Torres. The win secured Barcelona's 29th La Liga title and their second in a row, marking the first time in the club's history they had clinched the league via a Clásico victory. Three days later, Barcelona were beaten 1–0 away by Alavés at Mendizorrotza. Álvaro Cortés made his first-team debut in the match. On the same day, Barcelona announced the contract renewal of manager Hansi Flick through 30 June 2028.

On 17 May, Barcelona beat Real Betis 3–1 at Camp Nou, with a brace from Raphinha and a further goal from João Cancelo. The result saw Barcelona complete the league season with 19 wins from 19 home matches, becoming the first Spanish side in 40 years to sweep all their home fixtures, and the first to do so under the 38-game format.

Barcelona closed out the month on 23 May with a 3–1 defeat away against Valencia at Mestalla, with Lewandowski scoring the visitors' only goal — his last for the club.

== Management team ==
Position	Name
Head coach	(Germany) Hansi Flick
Assistant coaches	(Germany) Marcus Sorg, (Croatia) Toni Tapalović, (Germany) Heiko Westermann, (Spain) Arnau Blanco, (Spain) Thiago Alcântara (from 11 September)
Goalkeeping coach	(Spain) José Ramón de la Fuente
Fitness coaches	(Spain) Julio Tous, (Spain) Pepe Conde, (Spain) Rafa Maldonado, (Spain) Germán Fernández, (Spain) Fernando Hernández, (Spain) Andrés Martín, (Spain) Milos Mallol
Rehab coaches	(Spain) Juan Carlos Pérez, (Spain) Yon Álvarez
Analysts	(Germany) Stephan Nopp, (Germany) Michael Hasemann, (Spain) Eloy Jordan, (Spain) Francesc Martí, (Spain) Xavier Pavo, (Spain) Jordi Pons, (Spain) Guillem Escriu

- Last updated: 11 September 2025
- Source: FC Barcelona Annual Report 2025/26

== Players ==
=== First team ===
N	Pos.	Nat.	Name	Age	EU	Since	App	Goals	Ends	Transfer fee	Notes
Goalkeepers
13	GK	(Spain)	Joan Garcia	25	EU	2025	45	0	2031	€25M	
25	GK	(Poland)	Wojciech Szczęsny	36	EU	2024	42	0	2027	Free	
Defenders
2	DF	(Portugal)	João Cancelo	31	EU	2026	65	6	2026	Loan	
3	DF	(Spain)	Alejandro Balde	22	EU	2022	168	3	2028	Youth system	
4	DF	(Uruguay)	Ronald Araújo (captain)	27	EU	2019	213	14	2031	€1.7M	Second nationality: Spain
5	DF	(Spain)	Pau Cubarsí	19	EU	2024	128	2	2029	Youth system	
15	DF	(Denmark)	Andreas Christensen	30	EU	2022	98	5	2026	Free	
18	DF	(Spain)	Gerard Martín	24	EU	2023	93	1	2028	Youth system	
23	DF	(France)	Jules Koundé	27	EU	2022	188	10	2030	€50M	
24	DF	(Spain)	Eric García	25	EU	2021	166	7	2031	Free	Originally from youth system
Midfielders
6	MF	(Spain)	Gavi (5th captain)	21	EU	2021	166	10	2030	Youth system	
8	MF	(Spain)	Pedri (4th captain)	23	EU	2020	245	28	2030	€5M	
16	MF	(Spain)	Fermín López	23	EU	2023	136	32	2031	Youth system	
17	MF	(Spain)	Marc Casadó	22	EU	2022	75	1	2028	Youth system	
20	MF	(Spain)	Dani Olmo	28	EU	2024	88	20	2030	€55M	Originally from youth system
21	MF	(Netherlands)	Frenkie de Jong (vice-captain)	29	EU	2019	297	20	2029	€75M	
22	MF	(Spain)	Marc Bernal	18	EU	2023	36	5	2029	Youth system	
Forwards
7	FW	(Spain)	Ferran Torres	26	EU	2021 (Winter)	207	65	2027	€55M	
9	FW	(Poland)	Robert Lewandowski	37	EU	2022	194	120	2026	€45M	
10	FW	(Spain)	Lamine Yamal	18	EU	2023	151	49	2031	Youth system	
11	FW	(Brazil)	Raphinha (3rd captain)	29	EU	2022	177	75	2028	€58M	Second nationality: Italy
14	FW	(England)	Marcus Rashford	28	Non-EU	2025	49	14	2026	Loan	
19	FW	(Sweden)	Roony Bardghji	20	EU	2025	28	2	2029	€2.5M	

- Last updated: 23 May 2026
- Source: FC Barcelona, La Liga and UEFA
- Ordered by squad number.

=== Reserve team ===
N	Pos.	Nat.	Name	Age	EU	Since	App	Goals	Ends	Transfer fee	Notes
26	DF	(Spain)	Jofre Torrents	19	EU	2025	4	0	2028	Youth system	
29	FW	(Spain)	Toni Fernández	17	EU	2024	2	0	2027	Youth system	
30	MF	(Spain)	Guille Fernández	17	EU	2024	0	0	2027	Youth system	
31	GK	(United States)	Diego Kochen	20	Non-EU	2024	0	0	2026	Youth system	
32	DF	(Spain)	Alexis Olmedo	20	EU	2024	0	0	2029	Youth system	
33	GK	(Spain)	Eder Aller	19	EU	2025	0	0	2026	Youth system	
34	DF	(Spain)	Landry Farré	19	EU	2024	0	0	2028	Youth system	
35	GK	(Spain)	Max Bonfill	19	EU	2026	0	0	2026	Youth system	
36	DF	(Spain)	Álvaro Cortés	21	EU	2023	1	0	2027	Youth system	
37	MF	(Spain)	Dani Rodríguez	20	EU	2024	1	0	2027	Youth system	
40	MF	(Spain)	Quim Junyent	19	EU	2024	0	0	2029	Youth system	
41	MF	(Spain)	Juan Hernández	18	EU	2025	0	0	2026	Youth system	
42	DF	(Spain)	Xavi Espart	19	EU	2025	6	0	2028	Youth system	
43	MF	(Spain)	Tommy Marqués	19	EU	2026	2	0	2028	Youth system	

- Last updated: 23 May 2026
- Source: FC Barcelona, La Liga and UEFA
- Ordered by squad number.

=== Contract renewals ===
No.	Pos.	Nat.	Name	Date	Until	Source
10	FW	(Spain)	Ansu Fati	1 July 2025	30 June 2028	
25	GK	(Poland)	Wojciech Szczęsny	7 July 2025	30 June 2027	
23	DF	(France)	Jules Koundé	15 August 2025	30 June 2030	
13	GK	(Spain)	Iñaki Peña	27 August 2025	30 June 2029	
22	MF	(Spain)	Marc Bernal	29 September 2025	30 June 2029	
21	MF	(Netherlands)	Frenkie de Jong	15 October 2025	30 June 2029	
24	DF	(Spain)	Eric García	5 December 2025	30 June 2031	
16	MF	(Spain)	Fermín López	30 January 2026	30 June 2031	
Manager		(Germany)	Hansi Flick	18 May 2026	30 June 2028	

== Transfers ==
=== In ===
No.	Pos.	Player	Transfer from	Fee	Date	Source
Summer
—	MF	(Spain) Oriol Romeu	Girona	Loan return	1 July 2025	
13	GK	(Spain) Joan Garcia	Espanyol	€25 million	18 June 2025	
28/19	FW	(Sweden) Roony Bardghji	(Denmark) Copenhagen	€2.5 million	14 July 2025	
Total				€27.5 million		

=== Out ===
No.	Pos.	Player	Transfer to	Fee	Date	Source
Summer
—	DF	(Spain) Álex Valle	(Italy) Como	€6 million	3 June 2025	
—	DF	(France) Clément Lenglet	Atlético Madrid	Contract termination	9 June 2025	
29	MF	(Spain) Aleix Garrido	Eibar	Free transfer	20 June 2025	
36	DF	(Spain) Sergi Domínguez	(Croatia) Dinamo Zagreb	€1.2 million	30 June 2025	
34	MF	(Germany) Noah Darvich	(Germany) VfB Stuttgart	€2.2 million	1 July 2025	
30	MF	(Spain) Pau Prim	(Qatar) Al Sadd	Free transfer	1 July 2025	
14	MF	(Spain) Pablo Torre	Mallorca	€5 million	14 July 2025	
18	FW	(Spain) Pau Víctor	(Portugal) Braga	€12 million	25 July 2025	
5	DF	(Spain) Iñigo Martínez	(Saudi Arabia) Al-Nassr	Free transfer	9 August 2025	
—	FW	(Portugal) Francisco Trincão	(Portugal) Sporting CP	€11 million (Note: Sporting purchased 50% remaining player rights.)	15 August 2025	
—	FW	(Spain) Jan Virgili	Mallorca	€3 million	28 August 2025	
—	MF	(Spain) Oriol Romeu	(England) Southampton	Contract termination	5 September 2025	
Winter
27	MF	(Spain) Dro Fernández	(France) Paris Saint-Germain	€8.2 million (Note: Release clause paid was €6 million. Barcelona negotiated a higher fee)	26 January 2026	
Total				€45.6 million		

=== Loans in ===
No.	Pos.	Player	Loaned from	Fee	Date	On loan until	Source
Summer
14	FW	(England) Marcus Rashford	(England) Manchester United	None	23 July 2025	30 June 2026	
Winter
2	DF	(Portugal) João Cancelo	(Saudi Arabia) Al Hilal	None	13 January 2026	30 June 2026	
Total				€0			

=== Loans out ===
No.	Pos.	Player	Loaned to	Fee	Date	On loan until	Source
Summer
26	GK	(Spain) Ander Astralaga	Granada	None	1 July 2025	30 June 2026	
10	FW	(Spain) Ansu Fati	(France) Monaco (Note: Monaco is a Monégasque club playing in the French football league system.)	None	1 July 2025	30 June 2026	
40	GK	(Hungary) Áron Yaakobishvili	Andorra (Note: Andorra is an Andorran club playing in the Spanish football league system.)	None	15 July 2025	30 June 2026	
13	GK	(Spain) Iñaki Peña	Elche	None	27 August 2025	30 June 2026	
32	DF	(Spain) Héctor Fort	Elche	None	1 September 2025	30 June 2026	
Winter
1	GK	(Germany) Marc-André ter Stegen	Girona	None	20 January 2026	30 June 2026	
38	DF	(Spain) Andrés Cuenca	Sporting Gijón	None	2 February 2026	30 June 2026	
Total				€0			

== Pre-season and friendlies ==
Win Draw Loss Fixtures

27 July 2025 Friendly	Vissel Kobe	1–3	Barcelona	Kobe, Japan
19:00 JST (UTC+9)	Miyashiro 42'	Report	E. García 33'; Bardghji 77'; Dro 87'	Stadium: Noevir Stadium Kobe; Attendance: 14,950

31 July 2025 Friendly	FC Seoul	3–7	Barcelona	Seoul, South Korea
20:00 KST (UTC+9)	Cho Young-wook 26'; Al-Arab 45+1'; Do-Yun Hwang (yellow card) 68'; Jung Han-min 85'	Report	Lewandowski 8'; Yamal 14', 45+3'; Christensen 55'; Torres 74', 88'; Gavi 76'	Stadium: Seoul World Cup Stadium; Attendance: 62,482; Referee: Kim Dae-yong (South Korea)

4 August 2025 Friendly	Daegu FC	0–5	Barcelona	Daegu, South Korea
20:00 KST (UTC+9)		Report	Gavi 21', 45+2'; Lewandowski 27'; Fernández 54'; Rashford 65'	Stadium: Daegu Stadium; Referee: Ko Hyung-jin (South Korea)

10 August 2025 Joan Gamper Trophy	Barcelona	5–0	Como	Sant Joan Despí, Spain
21:00 CEST (UTC+2)	Fermín 21', 35'; Raphinha 37'; Yamal 42', 49'	Report		Stadium: Johan Cruyff Stadium; Attendance: 6,000; Referee: Ricardo de Burgos Bengoetxea (Spain)

== Competitions ==
=== Overall record ===
Competition	First match	Last match	Starting round	Final position	Record							
Competition	First match	Last match	Starting round	Final position	Pld	W	D	L	GF	GA	GD	Win %
La Liga	16 August 2025	23 May 2026	Matchday 1	Winners	38	31	1	6	95	36	+59	81.58
Copa del Rey	16 December 2025	3 March 2026	Round of 32	Semi-finals	5	4	0	1	9	5	+4	80.00
Supercopa de España	7 January 2026	11 January 2026	Semi-finals	Winners	2	2	0	0	8	2	+6	100.00
UEFA Champions League	18 September 2025	14 April 2026	League phase	Quarter-finals	12	7	2	3	32	20	+12	58.33
Total					57	44	3	10	144	63	+81	77.19

Source: Soccerway

=== La Liga ===
==== League table ====
Pos	Team	Pld	W	D	L	GF	GA	GD	Pts	Qualification or relegation
1	Barcelona (C)	38	31	1	6	95	36	+59	94	Qualification for the Champions League league phase (Note: La Liga gained an additional Champions League place as a result of Spain gaining one of the two European Performance Spots (EPS) awarded to the two associations with the highest UEFA coefficient points in 2025–26.)
2	Real Madrid	38	27	5	6	77	35	+42	86	Qualification for the Champions League league phase
3	Villarreal	38	22	6	10	72	46	+26	72	Qualification for the Champions League league phase
4	Atlético Madrid	38	21	6	11	62	44	+18	69	Qualification for the Champions League league phase
5	Real Betis	38	15	15	8	59	48	+11	60	Qualification for the Champions League league phase

Source: LaLiga EA Sports
Rules for classification: 1) Points; 2) Head-to-head points; 3) Head-to-head goal difference; 4) Goal difference; 5) Goals scored; 6) Fair-play points
(Note: Head-to-head record is used only after all the matches between the teams in question have been played)
(C) Champions

==== Results summary ====
Overall								Home						Away					
Pld	W	D	L	GF	GA	GD	Pts	W	D	L	GF	GA	GD	W	D	L	GF	GA	GD
38	31	1	6	95	36	+59	94	19	0	0	57	10	+47	12	1	6	38	26	+12

Source: La Liga

==== Results by round ====
Round	1	2	3	4	5	6	7	8	9	10	11	12	13	14	19^{1}	15	16	17	18	20	21	22	23	24	25	26	27	28	29	30	31	32	33	34	35	36	37	38
Ground	A	A	A	H	H	A	H	A	H	A	H	A	H	H	H	A	H	A	A	A	H	A	H	A	H	H	A	H	H	A	H	H	A	A	H	A	H	A
Result	W	W	D	W	W	W	W	L	W	L	W	W	W	W	W	W	W	W	W	L	W	W	W	L	W	W	W	W	W	W	W	W	W	W	W	L	W	L
Position	1	2	4	2	2	2	1	2	2	2	2	2	2	1	1	1	1	1	1	1	1	1	1	2	1	1	1	1	1	1	1	1	1	1	1	1	1	1
Points	3	6	7	10	13	16	19	19	22	22	25	28	31	34	37	40	43	46	49	49	52	55	58	58	61	64	67	70	73	76	79	82	85	88	91	91	94	94

Source: La Liga
A = Away; H = Home; W = Win; D = Draw; L = Loss; P = Postponed

^{1} Matchday 19 (vs Atlético Madrid) was brought forward due to both clubs' involvement in the 2026 Supercopa de España.

==== Matches ====
16 August 2025 1	Mallorca	0–3	Barcelona	Palma
19:30 CEST (UTC+2)	Morey (yellow card) 9'; Morlanes (yellow card) 24' (yellow-red card) 33'; Muriqi (red card) 39'; Torre (yellow card) 42'	Report	Raphinha 7', (yellow card) 45+7'; Torres 23'; Yamal 90+4'	Stadium: Son Moix; Attendance: 23,318; Referee: José Luis Munuera Montero

23 August 2025 2	Levante	2–3	Barcelona	Valencia
21:30 CEST (UTC+2)	Romero 15'; Martínez (yellow card) 45+3'; Morales 45+7' (pen.), (yellow card) 46'; Pampín (yellow card) 89'	Report	Balde (yellow card) 44'; Pedri 49'; Torres 52'; Elgezabal 90+1' (o.g.)	Stadium: Ciutat de València; Attendance: 23,415; Referee: Alejandro Hernández Hernández

31 August 2025 3	Rayo Vallecano	1–1	Barcelona	Madrid
21:30 CEST (UTC+2)	Batalla (yellow card) 38'; Trejo (yellow card) 38'; López (yellow card) 45'; Pérez 67'; Chavarría (yellow card) 90+4'	Report	Yamal 40' (pen.); Koundé (yellow card) 56'	Stadium: Vallecas; Attendance: 14,438; Referee: Mateo Busquets Ferrer

14 September 2025 4	Barcelona	6–0	Valencia	Sant Joan Despí
21:00 CEST (UTC+2)	Fermín 29', 56'; Raphinha 53', 66'; Lewandowski 76', 86'	Report	Diakhaby (yellow card) 41'	Stadium: Johan Cruyff Stadium; Attendance: 5,862; Referee: Guillermo Cuadra Fernández

21 September 2025 5	Barcelona	3–0	Getafe	Sant Joan Despí
21:00 CEST (UTC+2)	Torres 15', 34'; Raphinha (yellow card) 32'; Christensen (yellow card) 54'; Olmo 62'	Report	Martín (yellow card) 3'; Liso (yellow card) 42'; Djené (yellow card) 44'; Abqar (yellow card) 58'	Stadium: Johan Cruyff Stadium; Attendance: 5,711; Referee: Ricardo de Burgos Bengoetxea

25 September 2025 6	Oviedo	1–3	Barcelona	Oviedo
21:30 CEST (UTC+2)	Reina 33'; Bailly (yellow card) 90+2'	Report	E. García 56'; Lewandowski 70'; Araújo 88'	Stadium: Carlos Tartiere; Attendance: 29,850; Referee: Miguel Ángel Ortiz Arias

28 September 2025 7	Barcelona	2–1	Real Sociedad	Barcelona
18:30 CEST (UTC+2)	Koundé 43', (yellow card) 82'; Lewandowski 59'	Report	Zubeldia (yellow card) 17'; Odriozola 31'; Ćaleta-Car (yellow card) 90+2'	Stadium: Estadi Olímpic Lluís Companys; Attendance: 50,103; Referee: Alejandro Hernández Hernández

5 October 2025 8	Sevilla	4–1	Barcelona	Seville
16:15 CEST (UTC+2)	Sánchez 13' (pen.); Marcão (yellow card) 20'; Romero 37', (yellow card) 50'; Januzaj (yellow card) 74'; Agoumé (yellow card) 81'; Carmona 90'; Peque (yellow card) 90+5'; Adams 90+6', (yellow card) 90+7'; Gudelj (yellow card) 90+8'	Report	Martín (yellow card) 16'; Torres (yellow card) 21'; De Jong (yellow card) 38'; Rashford 45+7', (yellow card) 84'; Lewandowski (penalty missed) 76'; Araújo (yellow card) 90+11'	Stadium: Ramón Sánchez Pizjuán; Attendance: 41,040; Referee: Alejandro Muñiz Ruiz

18 October 2025 9	Barcelona	2–1	Girona	Barcelona
16:15 CEST (UTC+2)	Pedri 13'; Araújo 90+3', (yellow card) 90+4'	Report	Witsel 20'; Stuani (yellow card) 75'; Moreno (yellow card) 84'	Stadium: Estadi Olímpic Lluís Companys; Attendance: 43,172; Referee: Jesús Gil Manzano

26 October 2025 10	Real Madrid	2–1	Barcelona	Madrid
16:15 CET (UTC+1)	Mbappé 22', (penalty missed) 52'; Valverde (yellow card) 23'; Bellingham 43'; Huijsen (yellow card) 57'; Vinícius (yellow card) 90+11'; Lunin (red card) 90+11'; Militão (yellow card) 90+11'; Rodrygo (yellow card) 90+11'	Report	Fermín 38', (yellow card) 90+9'; Pedri (yellow card) 42' (yellow-red card) 90+10'; Balde (yellow card) 90+11'; Torres (yellow card) 90+11'	Stadium: Bernabéu; Attendance: 78,107; Referee: César Soto Grado
Note: Lunin received a red card as an unused substitute.

2 November 2025 11	Barcelona	3–1	Elche	Barcelona
18:30 CET (UTC+1)	Yamal 9'; Torres 11'; Rashford 61'	Report	Neto (yellow card) 35'; Mir 42'	Stadium: Estadi Olímpic Lluís Companys; Attendance: 44,370; Referee: Miguel Sesma Espinosa

9 November 2025 12	Celta Vigo	2–4	Barcelona	Vigo
21:00 CET (UTC+1)	Carreira 11'; Iglesias 43'; Román (yellow card) 89'	Report	Lewandowski 10' (pen.), 37', 73', (yellow card) 88'; Cubarsí (yellow card) 42'; Yamal 45+4'; De Jong (yellow card) 79' (yellow-red card) 90+4'; Rashford (yellow card) 87'	Stadium: Abanca-Balaídos; Attendance: 21,887; Referee: Javier Alberola Rojas

22 November 2025 13	Barcelona	4–0	Athletic Bilbao	Barcelona
16:15 CET (UTC+1)	Lewandowski 4'; Torres 45+3', 90'; Fermín 48'	Report	Ruiz de Galarreta (yellow card) 43'; Sancet (red card) 54'; Gorosabel (yellow card) 73'	Stadium: Camp Nou; Attendance: 45,157; Referee: José María Sánchez Martínez

29 November 2025 14	Barcelona	3–1	Alavés	Barcelona
16:15 CET (UTC+1)	Yamal 8'; Olmo 26', 90+3'; Bernal (yellow card) 36'; J. Garcia (yellow card) 90+2'	Report	Ibáñez 1'; Abde (yellow card) 32'; Calebe (yellow card) 53'; Blanco (yellow card) 81'	Stadium: Camp Nou; Attendance: 44,834; Referee: Miguel Ángel Ortiz Arias

2 December 2025 19	Barcelona	3–1	Atlético Madrid	Barcelona
21:00 CET (UTC+1)	Raphinha 26'; Lewandowski (penalty missed) 36'; Martín (yellow card) 45+2'; Olmo 65'; Torres 90+6'	Report	Baena 19', (yellow card) 41'	Stadium: Camp Nou; Attendance: 45,205; Referee: Ricardo de Burgos Bengoetxea
Note: The match date was pushed forward due to both clubs' involvement in the 2026 Supercopa de España.

6 December 2025 15	Real Betis	3–5	Barcelona	Seville
18:30 CET (UTC+1)	Antony 6'; Altimira (yellow card) 21'; Deossa (yellow card) 59'; Ruibal (yellow card) 67'; Llorente 85'; Gómez (yellow card) 87'; Hernández 90' (pen.)	Report	Torres 11', 13', 40'; Martín (yellow card) 48'; Bardghji 31'; Yamal 59' (pen.); Koundé (yellow card) 90'	Stadium: La Cartuja; Attendance: 64,562; Referee: Francisco José Hernández Maeso

13 December 2025 16	Barcelona	2–0	Osasuna	Barcelona
18:30 CET (UTC+1)	Raphinha 70', 86'	Report	Bretones (yellow card) 35'; Muñoz (yellow card) 59'; Moncayola (yellow card) 67'	Stadium: Camp Nou; Attendance: 42,058; Referee: Adrián Cordero Vega

21 December 2025 17	Villarreal	0–2	Barcelona	Villarreal
16:15 CET (UTC+1)	Veiga (red card) 39'; Buchanan (yellow card) 73'	Report	Raphinha 12' (pen.); De Jong (yellow card) 58'; Yamal 63'	Stadium: La Cerámica; Attendance: 20,701; Referee: Javier Alberola Rojas

3 January 2026 18	Espanyol	0–2	Barcelona	Cornellà de Llobregat
21:00 CET (UTC+1)	Lozano (yellow card) 77'	Report	Olmo 86'; Lewandowski 90'	Stadium: RCDE Stadium; Attendance: 36,283; Referee: Victor García Verdura

18 January 2026 20	Real Sociedad	2–1	Barcelona	San Sebastián
21:00 CET (UTC+1)	Oyarzabal 32'; Turrientes (yellow card) 37'; Aramburu (yellow card) 51'; Guedes 71'; Zubeldia (yellow card) 78'; Soler (red card) 88'	Report	Rashford 70'; E. García (yellow card) 76'; Lewandowski (yellow card) 83'; Fermín (yellow card) 85'	Stadium: Anoeta; Attendance: 36,346; Referee: Jesús Gil Manzano

25 January 2026 21	Barcelona	3–0	Oviedo	Barcelona
16:15 CET (UTC+1)	Martín (yellow card) 9'; Olmo 52'; Raphinha 57'; Yamal 73'	Report	Aarón (yellow card) 33'; Costas (yellow card) 43'	Stadium: Camp Nou; Attendance: 44,763; Referee: José Luis Munuera Montero

31 January 2026 22	Elche	1–3	Barcelona	Elche
21:00 CET (UTC+1)	Rodríguez 29'; Donald (yellow card) 38'; Sarabia (yellow card) 74'; Mendoza (yellow card) 76'	Report	Yamal 6'; Torres 40'; Rashford 72'; De Jong (yellow card) 90'	Stadium: Martínez Valero; Attendance: 31,233; Referee: Alejandro Muñiz Ruiz

7 February 2026 23	Barcelona	3–0	Mallorca	Barcelona
16:15 CET (UTC+1)	Lewandowski 29'; Yamal 61'; Bernal 83'	Report		Stadium: Camp Nou; Attendance: 44,301; Referee: Alejandro Quintero González

16 February 2026 24	Girona	2–1	Barcelona	Girona
21:00 CET (UTC+1)	Lemar 61'; Beltrán 86'; Roca (red card) 90+9'; Vitor Reis (yellow card) 90+10'	Report	E. García (yellow card) 41'; Yamal (penalty missed) 45+3'; Cubarsí 59'; Koundé (yellow card) 84'	Stadium: Montilivi; Attendance: 14,043; Referee: César Soto Grado

22 February 2026 25	Barcelona	3–0	Levante	Barcelona
16:15 CET (UTC+1)	Bernal 4', (yellow card) 59'; De Jong 32'; Martín (yellow card) 45+3'; Fermín 81'	Report	Tunde (yellow card) 20'	Stadium: Camp Nou; Attendance: 44,936; Referee: Javier Alberola Rojas

28 February 2026 26	Barcelona	4–1	Villarreal	Barcelona
16:15 CET (UTC+1)	Yamal 28', 37', 69'; Bernal (yellow card) 53'; Raphinha (yellow card) 56'; Lewandowski 90+1'	Report	Gueye 49'; Pedraza (yellow card) 68'	Stadium: Camp Nou; Attendance: 44,256; Referee: Isidro Díaz de Mera Escuderos

7 March 2026 27	Athletic Bilbao	0–1	Barcelona	Bilbao
21:00 CET (UTC+1)	Rego (yellow card) 50'; Vivian (yellow card) 90+3'	Report	Cubarsí (yellow card) 57'; Yamal 68'	Stadium: San Mamés; Attendance: 50,629; Referee: José Luis Munuera Montero

15 March 2026 28	Barcelona	5–2	Sevilla	Barcelona
16:15 CET (UTC+1)	Raphinha 9' (pen.), 21' (pen.), 51'; Olmo 38'; Cancelo 60'	Report	Suazo (yellow card) 37'; Oso 45+3'; Sow 90+2'	Stadium: Camp Nou; Attendance: 56,483; Referee: Juan Martínez Munuera

22 March 2026 29	Barcelona	1–0	Rayo Vallecano	Barcelona
14:00 CET (UTC+1)	Raphinha (yellow card) 8'; Araújo 24'; Yamal (yellow card) 26'; Cubarsí (yellow card) 72'	Report	Valentín (yellow card) 34'; Pérez (yellow card) 65'; Ciss (yellow card) 67'; Palazón (yellow card) 88'	Stadium: Camp Nou; Attendance: 56,812; Referee: Adrián Cordero Vega

4 April 2026 30	Atlético Madrid	1–2	Barcelona	Madrid
21:00 CEST (UTC+2)	González (yellow card) 22' (yellow-red card) 45+7'; Simeone 39'; Koke (yellow card) 45'; Molina (yellow card) 45'; Musso (yellow card) 50'; Lenglet (yellow card) 53'; Seidu (yellow card) 90+3'	Report	Rashford 42'; Fermín (yellow card) 45'; Martín (yellow card) 50'; Lewandowski 87'	Stadium: Riyadh Air Metropolitano; Attendance: 67,710; Referee: Mateo Busquets Ferrer

11 April 2026 31	Barcelona	4–1	Espanyol	Barcelona
18:30 CEST (UTC+2)	Torres 9', 25'; Gavi (yellow card) 32'; E. García (yellow card) 45+3'; Casadó (yellow card) 49'; Yamal 87'; Rashford 89'	Report	El Hilali (yellow card) 32'; Expósito (yellow card) 34'; Ngonge (yellow card) 45'; Lozano 56', (yellow card) 58'; Calero (yellow card) 83'; González de Zárate (yellow card) 90+2'	Stadium: Camp Nou; Attendance: 60,736; Referee: Alejandro Hernández Hernández

22 April 2026 32	Barcelona	1–0	Celta Vigo	Barcelona
21:30 CEST (UTC+2)	Yamal 40' (pen.); E. García (yellow card) 90+2'	Report	Lago (yellow card) 59'	Stadium: Camp Nou; Attendance: 59,034; Referee: José Luis Munuera Montero

25 April 2026 33	Getafe	0–2	Barcelona	Getafe
16:15 CEST (UTC+2)	Djené (yellow card) 63'; Martín (yellow card) 87'	Report	Koundé (yellow card) 20'; Gavi (yellow card) 39'; Fermín 45'; Rashford 74'	Stadium: Coliseum; Attendance: 9,487; Referee: Francisco José Hernández Maeso

2 May 2026 34	Osasuna	1–2	Barcelona	Pamplona
21:00 CEST (UTC+2)	Moncayola (yellow card) 74'; Ra. García 88'; Barja (yellow card) 90+9'	Report	Gavi (yellow card) 24'; E. García (yellow card) 60'; Lewandowski 81'; Torres 86'	Stadium: El Sadar; Attendance: 22,743; Referee: Isidro Díaz de Mera Escuderos

10 May 2026 35	Barcelona	2–0	Real Madrid	Barcelona
21:00 CEST (UTC+2)	Rashford 9'; Torres 18'; Olmo (yellow card) 52'; Raphinha (yellow card) 81'	Report	Camavinga (yellow card) 40'; Asencio (yellow card) 52'; Bellingham (yellow card) 55'; Alexander-Arnold (yellow card) 81'	Stadium: Camp Nou; Attendance: 62,213; Referee: Alejandro Hernández Hernández

13 May 2026 36	Alavés	1–0	Barcelona	Vitoria-Gasteiz
21:30 CEST (UTC+2)	Diabate 45+1'; Abde (yellow card) 81'	Report	Rashford (yellow card) 46'; Cancelo (yellow card) 89'	Stadium: Mendizorrotza; Attendance: 19,138; Referee: José María Sánchez Martínez

17 May 2026 37	Barcelona	3–1	Real Betis	Barcelona
21:15 CEST (UTC+2)	Raphinha 28', 62'; Koundé (yellow card) 38'; Cancelo 74'	Report	Isco 69' (pen.)	Stadium: Camp Nou; Attendance: 56,868; Referee: Guillermo Cuadra Fernández

23 May 2026 38	Valencia	3–1	Barcelona	Valencia
21:00 CEST (UTC+2)	Tárrega (yellow card) 63'; Nuñez (yellow card) 65'; Guerra 66'; Rioja 71'; Rodríguez 90+7'	Report	Lewandowski 61'; Christensen (yellow card) 70'; Bernal (yellow card) 79'	Stadium: Mestalla; Attendance: 46,457; Referee: Adrián Cordero Vega

=== Copa del Rey ===
16 December 2025 Round of 32	Guadalajara	0–2	Barcelona	Guadalajara
21:00 CET (UTC+1)	Ramírez (yellow card) 32'; Mayo (yellow card) 54'; Ablanque (yellow card) 71'	Report	Bernal (yellow card) 30'; Christensen 76'; Rashford 90'	Stadium: Pedro Escartín; Attendance: 7,900; Referee: César Soto Grado

15 January 2026 Round of 16	Racing Santander	0–2	Barcelona	Santander
21:00 CET (UTC+1)	García (yellow card) 29'; Rodríguez (yellow card) 71'; Sangalli (yellow card) 89'	Report	Torres 66'; Fermín (yellow card) 73'; Yamal 90+5'	Stadium: El Sardinero; Attendance: 22,481; Referee: José María Sánchez Martínez

3 February 2026 Quarter-finals	Albacete	1–2	Barcelona	Albacete
21:00 CET (UTC+1)	Bernabéu (yellow card) 25'; Moreno 87'	Report	Cancelo (yellow card) 15'; Yamal 39'; Araújo 56'	Stadium: Carlos Belmonte; Attendance: 16,745; Referee: José Luis Munuera Montero

12 February 2026 Semi-finals; First leg	Atlético Madrid	4–0	Barcelona	Madrid
21:00 CET (UTC+1)	E. García 6' (o.g.); Griezmann 14'; Lookman 33'; Alvarez 45+2'; Simeone (yellow card) 50'; Llorente (yellow card) 51'; Baena (yellow card) 79'; Pubill (yellow card) 86'; Ruggeri (yellow card) 90+8'	Report	Casadó (yellow card) 26'; E. García (red card) 85'; Fermín (yellow card) 86'; Olmo (yellow card) 86'	Stadium: Riyadh Air Metropolitano; Attendance: 69,200; Referee: Juan Martínez Munuera

3 March 2026 Semi-finals; Second leg	Barcelona	3–0 (3–4 agg.)	Atlético Madrid	Barcelona
21:00 CET (UTC+1)	Bernal 29', 72'; Raphinha 45+5' (pen.); Olmo (yellow card) 66'; Cancelo (yellow card) 67'; Yamal (yellow card) 90+3'	Report	Baena (yellow card) 90+5'	Stadium: Camp Nou; Attendance: 45,398; Referee: Ricardo de Burgos Bengoetxea

=== Supercopa de España ===
7 January 2026 Semi-finals	Barcelona	5–0	Athletic Bilbao	Jeddah, Saudi Arabia
22:00 SAST (UTC+3)	Torres 22'; Fermín 30'; Bardghji 34'; Raphinha 38', 52'	Report		Stadium: King Abdullah Sports City Stadium; Attendance: 50,141; Referee: Isidro Díaz de Mera Escuderos

11 January 2026 Final	Barcelona	3–2	Real Madrid	Jeddah, Saudi Arabia
22:00 SAST (UTC+3)	Raphinha 36', 73'; Lewandowski 45+4'; E. García (yellow card) 57'; Pedri (yellow card) 86'; De Jong (red card) 90+1'	Report	Vinícius 45+2'; G. García 45+6'; Asencio (yellow card) 57'; Valverde (yellow card) 59'; Carreras (yellow card) 82'	Stadium: King Abdullah Sports City Stadium; Attendance: 60,326; Referee: José Luis Munuera Montero

=== UEFA Champions League ===
==== League phase ====
The draw for the league phase was held on 28 August 2025.

Pos	Team	Pld	W	D	L	GF	GA	GD	Pts	Qualification
3	(The Football Association) Liverpool	8	6	0	2	20	8	+12	18	Advance to round of 16 (seeded)
4	(The Football Association) Tottenham Hotspur	8	5	2	1	17	7	+10	17	Advance to round of 16 (seeded)
5	(Royal Spanish Football Federation) Barcelona	8	5	1	2	22	14	+8	16	Advance to round of 16 (seeded)
6	(The Football Association) Chelsea	8	5	1	2	17	10	+7	16	Advance to round of 16 (seeded)
7	(Portuguese Football Federation) Sporting CP	8	5	1	2	17	11	+6	16	Advance to round of 16 (seeded)

Source: UEFA
Rules for classification: League phase tiebreakers

Round	1	2	3	4	5	6	7	8
Ground	A	H	H	A	A	H	A	H
Result	W	L	W	D	L	W	W	W
Position	12	16	9	11	18	15	9	5
Points	3	3	6	7	7	10	13	16

Source: UEFA
A = Away; H = Home; W = Win; D = Draw; L = Loss

===== Matches =====
18 September 2025 1	Newcastle United (England)	1–2	(Spain) Barcelona	Newcastle upon Tyne, England
20:00 BST (UTC+1)	Joelinton (yellow card) 28'; Burn (yellow card) 45+2'; Gordon 90'	Report	Martín (yellow card) 45'; Rashford 58', 67'; Fermín (yellow card) 75'; De Jong (yellow card) 82'; Casadó (yellow card) 90+7'	Stadium: St James' Park; Attendance: 52,084; Referee: Glenn Nyberg (Sweden)

1 October 2025 2	Barcelona (Spain)	1–2	(France) Paris Saint-Germain	Barcelona, Spain
21:00 CEST (UTC+2)	Torres 19'; De Jong (yellow card) 32'; Olmo (yellow card) 57'; Casadó (yellow card) 78'; Yamal (yellow card) 90+2'	Report	Mayulu 38'; Mendes (yellow card) 44'; Hakimi (yellow card) 87'; Ramos 90'	Stadium: Estadi Olímpic Lluís Companys; Attendance: 50,207; Referee: Michael Oliver (England)

21 October 2025 3	Barcelona (Spain)	6–1	(Greece) Olympiacos	Barcelona, Spain
18:45 CEST (UTC+2)	Fermín 7', 39', 76'; Balde (yellow card) 23'; Yamal 68' (pen.); Rashford 74', 79'	Report	Hezze (yellow card) 35' (yellow-red card) 57'; García (yellow card) 39'; El Kaabi 54' (pen.); Podence (yellow card) 55'	Stadium: Estadi Olímpic Lluís Companys; Attendance: 46,264; Referee: Urs Schnyder (Switzerland)

5 November 2025 4	Club Brugge (Belgium)	3–3	(Spain) Barcelona	Bruges, Belgium
21:00 CET (UTC+1)	Tresoldi 6'; Forbs 17', 63'; Onyedika (yellow card) 32'; Diakhon (yellow card) 81'	Report	Torres 8'; Koundé (yellow card) 47'; Yamal 61', (yellow card) 81'; Tzolis 77' (o.g.); Fermín (yellow card) 85'	Stadium: Jan Breydel Stadium; Attendance: 27,037; Referee: Anthony Taylor (England)

25 November 2025 5	Chelsea (England)	3–0	(Spain) Barcelona	London, England
20:00 GMT (UTC+0)	Koundé 27' (o.g.); Gusto (yellow card) 40'; Estêvão 55'; Delap 73'	Report	Araújo (yellow card) 32' (yellow-red card) 44'	Stadium: Stamford Bridge; Attendance: 39,323; Referee: Slavko Vinčić (Slovenia)

9 December 2025 6	Barcelona (Spain)	2–1	(Germany) Eintracht Frankfurt	Barcelona, Spain
21:00 CET (UTC+1)	Koundé 50', 53'; Yamal (yellow card) 56'; Martín (yellow card) 61'	Report	Knauff 21', (yellow card) 28'	Stadium: Camp Nou; Attendance: 38,439; Referee: Davide Massa (Italy)

21 January 2026 7	Slavia Prague (Czech Republic)	2–4	(Spain) Barcelona	Prague, Czechia
21:00 CET (UTC+1)	Kušej 10'; Lewandowski 44' (o.g.)	Report	Fermín 34', 42'; Olmo 63'; Lewandowski 71'; De Jong (yellow card) 87'	Stadium: Fortuna Arena; Attendance: 19,242; Referee: Chris Kavanagh (England)

28 January 2026 8	Barcelona (Spain)	4–1	(Denmark) Copenhagen	Barcelona, Spain
21:00 CET (UTC+1)	Lewandowski 48'; Yamal (yellow card) 38', (goal) 60'; Raphinha 69' (pen.); Rashford 85'	Report	Daðason 4'; López (yellow card) 27'; Suzuki (yellow card) 39'; Meling (yellow card) 87'; Pereira (yellow card) 90+3'	Stadium: Camp Nou; Attendance: 44,609; Referee: Benoît Bastien (France)

==== Knockout phase ====
===== Round of 16 =====
The draw for the round of 16 was held on 27 February 2026.

10 March 2026 First leg	Newcastle United (England)	1–1	(Spain) Barcelona	Newcastle upon Tyne, England
20:00 GMT (UTC+0)	Tonali (yellow card) 34'; Barnes 86'; Willock (yellow card) 90+4'	Report	Cancelo (yellow card) 68'; Yamal 90+6' (pen.)	Stadium: St James' Park; Attendance: 52,103; Referee: Marco Guida (Italy)

18 March 2026 Second leg	Barcelona (Spain)	7–2 (8–3 agg.)	(England) Newcastle United	Barcelona, Spain
18:45 CET (UTC+1)	Raphinha 6', 72'; Bernal 18'; Cubarsí (yellow card) 44'; Yamal 45+7' (pen.); Fermín 51'; Lewandowski 56', 61'	Report	Elanga 15', 28'; Joelinton (yellow card) 17'; Trippier (yellow card) 45+5'; Willock (yellow card) 60'	Stadium: Camp Nou; Attendance: 56,662; Referee: François Letexier (France)

===== Quarter-finals =====
The draw for the quarter-finals was held on 27 February 2026, the same time as the draw for the round of 16.

8 April 2026 First leg	Barcelona (Spain)	0–2	(Spain) Atlético Madrid	Barcelona, Spain
21:00 CEST (UTC+2)	Cubarsí (red card) 44'; Gavi (yellow card) 65'; Cancelo (yellow card) 90+4'	Report	Koke (yellow card) 31'; Alvarez 45'; Pubill (yellow card) 45+1'; Baena (yellow card) 63'; Sørloth 70'	Stadium: Camp Nou; Attendance: 59,522; Referee: István Kovács (Romania)

14 April 2026 Second leg	Atlético Madrid (Spain)	1–2 (3–2 agg.)	(Spain) Barcelona	Madrid, Spain
21:00 CEST (UTC+2)	Lookman 31'	Report	Yamal 4'; Torres 24'; Gavi (yellow card) 70'; E. García (red card) 79'	Stadium: Riyadh Air Metropolitano; Attendance: 69,268; Referee: Clément Turpin (France)

== Statistics ==
=== Overall ===
No.	Pos.	Nat.	Player	La Liga		Copa del Rey		Supercopa de España		Champions League		Total		Discipline		Notes
No.	Pos.	Nat.	Player	Apps	Goals	Apps	Goals	Apps	Goals	Apps	Goals	Apps	Goals	Yellow card	Red card	Notes
Goalkeepers
13	GK	(Spain)	Joan Garcia	30	0	4	0	2	0	9	0	45	0	1	0	
25	GK	(Poland)	Wojciech Szczęsny	8	0	0	0	0	0	3+1	0	12	0	0	0	
Defenders
2	DF	(Portugal)	João Cancelo	11+5	2	2+1	0	0	0	4	0	23	2	5	0	
3	DF	(Spain)	Alejandro Balde	21+7	0	2+2	0	2	0	6+2	0	42	0	3	0	
4	DF	(Uruguay)	Ronald Araújo	11+13	3	1+2	1	0+1	0	4+6	0	38	4	4	1	
5	DF	(Spain)	Pau Cubarsí	31	1	3+2	0	2	0	9+1	0	48	1	4	1	
15	DF	(Denmark)	Andreas Christensen	3+10	0	1	1	0	0	0+4	0	18	1	2	0	
18	DF	(Spain)	Gerard Martín	26+6	0	3+2	0	0+2	0	9+3	0	51	0	8	0	
23	DF	(France)	Jules Koundé	24+6	1	2+2	0	2	0	10	2	46	3	7	0	
24	DF	(Spain)	Eric García	33+2	1	2+1	0	2	0	9+1	0	51	1	5	1	
26	DF	(Spain)	Jofre Torrents	0+3	0	1	0	0	0	0	0	4	0	0	0	
36	DF	(Spain)	Álvaro Cortés	1	0	0	0	0	0	0	0	1	0	0	0	
42	DF	(Spain)	Xavi Espart	1+3	0	0	0	0	0	0+2	0	6	0	0	0	
Midfielders
6	MF	(Spain)	Gavi	7+4	0	0	0	0	0	1+1	0	13	0	4	0	
8	MF	(Spain)	Pedri	23+6	2	1+2	0	2	0	9	0	43	2	3	1	
16	MF	(Spain)	Fermín López	19+11	6	3+2	0	2	1	10+1	6	48	13	7	0	
17	MF	(Spain)	Marc Casadó	10+14	0	3+1	0	0	0	2+4	0	34	0	3	0	
20	MF	(Spain)	Dani Olmo	24+9	7	3+1	0	0+2	0	4+6	1	49	8	4	0	
21	MF	(Netherlands)	Frenkie de Jong	16+9	1	3	0	2	0	5+3	0	38	1	8	2	
22	MF	(Spain)	Marc Bernal	9+13	2	4	2	0+1	0	2+4	1	33	5	5	0	
43	MF	(Spain)	Tommy Marqués	0+2	0	0	0	0	0	0	0	2	0	0	0	
Forwards
7	FW	(Spain)	Ferran Torres	23+10	16	3+1	1	1+1	1	4+6	3	49	21	1	0	
9	FW	(Poland)	Robert Lewandowski	18+13	14	1+2	0	1	1	8+3	4	46	19	2	0	
10	FW	(Spain)	Lamine Yamal	26+2	16	5	2	1+1	0	10	6	45	24	6	0	
11	FW	(Brazil)	Raphinha	18+4	13	1+1	1	2	4	6+1	3	33	21	5	0	
14	FW	(England)	Marcus Rashford	18+14	8	3+1	1	0+2	0	5+6	5	49	14	3	0	
19	FW	(Sweden)	Roony Bardghji	8+13	1	1	0	1	1	1+4	0	28	2	0	0	
29	FW	(Spain)	Toni Fernández	1	0	0	0	0	0	0	0	1	0	0	0	
No longer with club
1	GK	(Germany)	Marc-André ter Stegen	0	0	1	0	0	0	0	0	1	0	0	0	
13	GK	(Spain)	Iñaki Peña	0	0	0	0	0	0	0	0	0	0	0	0	
27	MF	(Spain)	Dro Fernández	1+3	0	0	0	0	0	1	0	5	0	0	0	

Source: FBREF

=== Goalscorers ===
Rank	No.	Pos.	Nat.	Player	La Liga	Copa del Rey	Supercopa de España	Champions League	Total
1	10	FW	(Spain)	Lamine Yamal	16	2	—	6	24
2	7	FW	(Spain)	Ferran Torres	16	1	1	3	21
2	11	FW	(Brazil)	Raphinha	13	1	4	3	21
4	9	FW	(Poland)	Robert Lewandowski	14	—	1	4	19
5	14	FW	(England)	Marcus Rashford	8	1	—	5	14
6	16	MF	(Spain)	Fermín López	6	—	1	6	13
7	20	MF	(Spain)	Dani Olmo	7	—	—	1	8
8	22	MF	(Spain)	Marc Bernal	2	2	—	1	5
9	4	DF	(Uruguay)	Ronald Araújo	3	1	—	—	4
10	23	DF	(France)	Jules Koundé	1	—	—	2	3
11	8	MF	(Spain)	Pedri	2	—	—	—	2
11	28	FW	(Sweden)	Roony Bardghji	1	—	1	—	2
11	2	DF	(Portugal)	João Cancelo	2	—	—	—	2
14	24	DF	(Spain)	Eric García	1	—	—	—	1
14	15	DF	(Denmark)	Andreas Christensen	—	1	—	—	1
14	21	MF	(Netherlands)	Frenkie de Jong	1	—	—	—	1
14	5	DF	(Spain)	Pau Cubarsí	1	—	—	—	1
Own goals					1	—	—	1	2
Totals					95	9	8	32	144

=== Assists ===
Rank	No.	Pos.	Nat.	Player	La Liga	Copa del Rey	Supercopa de España	Champions League	Total
1	10	FW	(Spain)	Lamine Yamal	11	2	—	4	17
1	16	MF	(Spain)	Fermín López	9	1	3	4	17
3	8	MF	(Spain)	Pedri	9	—	1	2	12
4	14	FW	(England)	Marcus Rashford	8	1	—	3	12
5	20	MF	(Spain)	Dani Olmo	8	—	—	1	9
6	21	MF	(Netherlands)	Frenkie de Jong	5	2	—	1	8
7	11	FW	(Brazil)	Raphinha	3	1	1	2	7
8	28	FW	(Sweden)	Roony Bardghji	1	—	2	1	4
8	23	DF	(France)	Jules Koundé	3	—	—	1	4
10	3	DF	(Spain)	Alejandro Balde	2	—	—	1	3
10	2	DF	(Portugal)	João Cancelo	2	1	—	—	3
10	7	FW	(Spain)	Ferran Torres	2	—	—	1	3
13	3	DF	(Spain)	Eric García	2	—	—	—	2
13	9	FW	(Poland)	Robert Lewandowski	2	—	—	—	2
15	6	MF	(Spain)	Gavi	1	—	—	—	1
15	17	MF	(Spain)	Marc Casadó	1	—	—	—	1
15	22	MF	(Spain)	Marc Bernal	1	—	—	—	1
15	27	FW	(Spain)	Dro Fernández	—	—	—	1	1
15	18	DF	(Spain)	Gerard Martín	—	—	—	1	1
Totals					69	8	7	18	102

=== Hat-tricks ===
Player	Against	Minutes	Score after goals	Result	Date	Competition	Ref
(Spain) Fermín López	(Greece) Olympiacos	7', 39', 76'	1–0, 2–0, 5–1	6–1 (H)	21 October 2025	Champions League	
(Poland) Robert Lewandowski	(Spain) Celta Vigo	10', 37', 73'	0–1, 1–2, 2–4	2–4 (A)	9 November 2025	La Liga	
(Spain) Ferran Torres	(Spain) Real Betis	11', 13', 40'	1–1, 1–2, 1–4	3–5 (A)	6 December 2025	La Liga	
(Spain) Lamine Yamal	(Spain) Villarreal	28', 37', 69'	1–0, 2–0, 3–1	4–1 (H)	28 February 2026	La Liga	
(Brazil) Raphinha	(Spain) Sevilla	9', 21', 51'	1–0, 2–0, 4–1	5–2 (H)	15 March 2026	La Liga	

(H) – Home; (A) – Away

=== Clean sheets ===
Rank	No.	Nat.	Player	La Liga	Copa del Rey	Supercopa de España	Champions League	Total
1	13	(Spain)	Joan Garcia	15	2	1	—	18
2	1	(Germany)	Marc-André ter Stegen	—	1	—	—	1
Totals				15	3	1	0	19

=== Disciplinary record ===
No.	Pos.	Nat.	Player	La Liga			Copa del Rey			Supercopa de España			Champions League			Total		
No.	Pos.	Nat.	Player	Yellow card	(yellow card) (yellow-red card)	Red card	Yellow card	(yellow card) (yellow-red card)	Red card	Yellow card	(yellow card) (yellow-red card)	Red card	Yellow card	(yellow card) (yellow-red card)	Red card	Yellow card	(yellow card) (yellow-red card)	Red card
24	DF	(Spain)	Eric García	5					1						1	5		2
21	MF	(Netherlands)	Frenkie de Jong	3	1							1	3			6	1	1
5	DF	(Spain)	Pau Cubarsí	3									1		1	4		1
8	MF	(Spain)	Pedri		1						1						2	
4	DF	(Uruguay)	Ronald Araújo	2										1		2	1	
18	DF	(Spain)	Gerard Martín	6									2			8		
16	MF	(Spain)	Fermín López	3			2						2			7		
23	DF	(France)	Jules Koundé	6									1			7		
10	FW	(Spain)	Lamine Yamal	1			1						4			6		
6	MF	(Spain)	Gavi	3									2			5		
17	MF	(Spain)	Marc Casadó	1			1						2			4		
2	DF	(Portugal)	João Cancelo	1			2						2			5		
11	FW	(Brazil)	Raphinha	5												5		
22	MF	(Spain)	Marc Bernal	4			1									5		
3	DF	(Spain)	Alejandro Balde	2									1			3		
14	FW	(England)	Marcus Rashford	3						1						4		
20	MF	(Spain)	Dani Olmo	1			2						1			4		
9	FW	(Poland)	Robert Lewandowski	2												2		
7	FW	(Spain)	Ferran Torres	1												1		
15	DF	(Denmark)	Andreas Christensen	2												2		
13	GK	(Spain)	Joan Garcia	1												1		
Coach		(Germany)	Hansi Flick		1												1	
Totals				53	3		9		1	2		1	19	1	2	85	5	4

Source: FC Barcelona
Ordered by (red card) , (second yellow card) and (yellow card)
(yellow card) = Number of bookings; (second yellow card) = Number of sending offs after a second yellow card; (red card) = Number of sending offs by a direct red card.

=== Injury record ===
No.	Pos.	Nat.	Player	Type	Status	Source	Match	Inj. Date	Ret. Date	Injured days
28	MF	(Spain)	Marc Bernal	Anterior cruciate ligament tear — left knee		FCB.com	vs Rayo Vallecano	27 August 2024	14 September 2025	383
23	DF	(France)	Jules Koundé	Hamstring injury — left leg		FCB.com	vs Inter Milan	30 April 2025	27 July 2025	88
46	FW	(Spain)	Dani Rodríguez	Dislocated shoulder — right shoulder		FCB.com	vs Valladolid	3 May 2025	13 September 2025	133
7	FW	(Spain)	Ferran Torres	Appendicitis		FCB.com	Out of play	14 May 2025	27 July 2025	74
35	DF	(Spain)	Gerard Martín	Finger dislocated — right hand		FCB.com	vs Slovakia U21 with Spain U21	11 June 2025	27 July 2025	46
–	MF	(Mali)	Ibrahim Diarra	Rectus femoris muscle tear — right leg		FCB.com	in training	19 July 2025	26 April 2026	281
1	GK	(Germany)	Marc-André ter Stegen	Lower back problems		FCB.com	in training	24 July 2025	16 December 2025	145
9	FW	(Poland)	Robert Lewandowski	Hamstring problems — left thigh		FCB.com	in training	8 August 2025	23 August 2025	15
6	MF	(Spain)	Gavi	Medial meniscus injury — right knee		FCB.com	in training	30 August 2025	15 March 2026	197
3	DF	(Spain)	Alejandro Balde	Hamstring injury — left leg		FCB.com	in training	3 September 2025	1 October 2025	28
21	MF	(Netherlands)	Frenkie de Jong	External obturator muscle injury — right leg		FCB.com	vs Poland with Netherlands	8 September 2025	18 September 2025	10
10	FW	(Spain)	Lamine Yamal	Pubis problems		FCB.com	in training	13 September 2025	28 September 2025	15
16	MF	(Spain)	Fermín López	Iliopsoas muscle injury — left leg		FCB.com	vs Getafe	21 September 2025	18 October 2025	27
11	FW	(Brazil)	Raphinha	Hamstring injury — right thigh		FCB.com	vs Oviedo	25 September 2025	22 November 2025	58
13	GK	(Spain)	Joan Garcia	Medial meniscus rupture — left knee		FCB.com	vs Oviedo	25 September 2025	22 November 2025	58
10	FW	(Spain)	Lamine Yamal	Groin problem		FCB.com	vs Paris Saint-Germain	3 October 2025	18 October 2025	15
20	MF	(Spain)	Dani Olmo	Calf injury — left leg		FCB.com	in training	13 October 2025	2 November 2025	20
7	FW	(Spain)	Ferran Torres	Discomfort in the Hamstring — left leg		FCB.com	vs Georgia with Spain	13 October 2025	21 October 2025	8
9	FW	(Poland)	Robert Lewandowski	Hamstring injury — left thigh		FCB.com	vs Lithuania with Poland	14 October 2025	2 November 2025	19
8	MF	(Spain)	Pedri	Distal biceps femoris muscle tear — left thigh		FCB.com	vs Real Madrid	26 October 2025	29 November 2025	34
24	DF	(Spain)	Eric García	Broken nose		FCB.com	vs Club Brugge	5 November 2025	9 November 2025	4
16	MF	(Spain)	Fermín López	Soleus muscle injury — right leg		FCB.com	vs Chelsea	25 November 2025	6 December 2025	11
20	MF	(Spain)	Dani Olmo	Dislocated shoulder — left shoulder		FCB.com	vs Atlético Madrid	2 December 2025	3 January 2026	32
15	DF	(Denmark)	Andreas Christensen	Anterior cruciate ligament partial tear — left knee		FCB.com	in training	20 December 2025	13 May 2026	144
7	FW	(Spain)	Ferran Torres	Semimembranosus muscle injury — right leg		FCB.com	vs Real Sociedad	18 January 2026	28 January 2026	10
8	MF	(Spain)	Pedri	Hamstring injury — right leg		FCB.com	vs Slavia Prague	21 January 2026	22 February 2026	295
11	FW	(Brazil)	Raphinha	Adductor muscle strain — right thigh		FCB.com	vs Elche	31 January 2026	16 February 2026	16
21	MF	(Netherlands)	Frenkie de Jong	Hamstring injury — right leg		FCB.com	in training	26 February 2026	11 April 2026	44
3	DF	(Spain)	Alejandro Balde	Hamstring injury — left leg		FCB.com	vs Atlético Madrid	3 March 2026	8 April 2026	36
23	DF	(France)	Jules Koundé	Hamstring injury — left leg		FCB.com	vs Atlético Madrid	3 March 2026	4 April 2026	32
11	FW	(Brazil)	Raphinha	Hamstring injury — right thigh		FCB.com	vs France with Brazil	26 March 2026	10 May 2026	45
4	DF	(Uruguay)	Ronald Araújo	Tightness — left thigh		FCB.com	vs Atlético Madrid	4 April 2026	8 April 2026	4
28	MF	(Spain)	Marc Bernal	Sprain — left ankle		FCB.com	vs Atlético Madrid	4 April 2026	10 May 2026	36
10	FW	(Spain)	Lamine Yamal	Hamstring injury — left leg		FCB.com	vs Celta Vigo	22 April 2026	15 June 2026	54

- Player is injured
- Player has recovered from injury
Last updated: 15 June 2026
Source: FC Barcelona

== Milestones ==
=== Debuts ===
The following players made their competitive debuts for the first team during the campaign.

Legend

– Indicates youth academy debut.

Date	No.	Pos.	Nat.	Player	Age	Final score	Opponent	Competition	Source
16 August 2025	13	GK	(Spain)	Joan Garcia	24	0–3 (A)	Mallorca	La Liga	
16 August 2025	26	DF	(Spain)	Jofre Torrents	18	0–3 (A)	Mallorca	La Liga	
16 August 2025	14	FW	(England)	Marcus Rashford	27	0–3 (A)	Mallorca	La Liga	
14 September 2025	28	FW	(Sweden)	Roony Bardghji	19	6–0 (H)	Valencia	La Liga	
28 September 2025	27	MF	(Spain)	Dro Fernández	17	2–1 (H)	Real Sociedad	La Liga	
7 February 2026	43	MF	(Spain)	Tommy Marqués	19	3–0 (H)	Mallorca	La Liga	
10 March 2026	42	DF	(Spain)	Xavi Espart	18	1–1 (A)	Newcastle United	Champions League	
13 May 2026	36	DF	(Spain)	Álvaro Cortés	21	1–0 (A)	Alavés	La Liga	

(H) – Home; (A) – Away

=== Appearances ===
The following players made their 100th, 150th, 200th or 250th for Barcelona's first team during the campaign.

Date	No.	Pos.	Nat.	Name	Age	Final score	Opponent	Competition	Source
100th appearances
22 November 2025	16	MF	(Spain)	Fermín López	22	4–0 (H)	Athletic Bilbao	La Liga	
16 December 2025	5	DF	(Spain)	Pau Cubarsí	18	0–2 (A)	Guadalajara	Copa del Rey	
150th appearances
14 September 2025	9	FW	(Poland)	Robert Lewandowski	37	6–0 (H)	Valencia	La Liga	
21 September 2025	11	FW	(Brazil)	Raphinha	28	3–0 (H)	Getafe	La Liga	
1 October 2025	23	DF	(France)	Jules Koundé	26	1–2 (H)	Paris Saint-Germain	Champions League	
15 January 2026	3	DF	(Spain)	Alejandro Balde	22	0–2 (A)	Racing Santander	Copa del Rey	
3 February 2026	24	DF	(Spain)	Eric Garcia	25	1–2 (A)	Albacete	Copa del Rey	
14 April 2026	10	FW	(Spain)	Lamine Yamal	18	1–2 (A)	Atlético Madrid	Champions League	
200th appearances
3 March 2026	4	DF	(Uruguay)	Ronald Araújo	26	3–0 (H)	Atlético Madrid	Copa del Rey	
8 April 2026	7	FW	(Spain)	Ferran Torres	26	0–2 (H)	Atlético Madrid	Champions League	

(H) – Home; (A) – Away

=== First goals ===
The following players scored their first goals for Barcelona's first team during the campaign.

Date	No.	Pos.	Nat.	Name	Age	Score	Final score	Opponent	Competition	Source
18 September 2025	14	FW	(England)	Marcus Rashford	27	0–1 (A)	1–2 (A)	Newcastle United	Champions League	
6 December 2025	28	FW	(Sweden)	Roony Bardghji	20	1–3 (A)	3–5 (A)	Real Betis	La Liga	
7 February 2026	22	MF	(Spain)	Marc Bernal	18	3–0 (H)	3–0 (H)	Mallorca	La Liga	

(H) – Home; (A) – Away

=== Goals ===
The following players scored their 50th or 100th competitive goals for Barcelona's first team during the campaign.

Date	No.	Pos.	Nat.	Name	Age	Apps to milestone	Score	Final score	Opponent	Competition	Source
50th goal
2 November 2025	7	FW	(Spain)	Ferran Torres	25	170	2–0 (H)	3–1 (H)	Elche	La Liga	

(H) – Home; (A) – Away

=== First starts as captain ===
The following players made their first starts as captain of Barcelona's first team during the campaign.

Date	No.	Pos.	Nat.	Name	Age	Final score	Opponent	Competition	Source
22 November 2025	9	FW	(Poland)	Robert Lewandowski	37	4–0 (H)	Athletic Bilbao	La Liga	
15 January 2026	7	FW	(Spain)	Ferran Torres	25	0–2 (A)	Racing Santander	Copa del Rey	
7 March 2026	24	DF	(Spain)	Eric Garcia	25	0–1 (A)	Athletic Bilbao	La Liga	

(H) – Home; (A) – Away

== Awards ==
=== Monthly awards ===
Player	Position	Award	Ref.
August
(Spain) Pedri	Midfielder	La Liga Goal of the Month	
(Spain) Joan Garcia	Goalkeeper	La Liga Save of the Month	
November
(Spain) Lamine Yamal	Forward	La Liga Player of the Month	
December
(Spain) Lamine Yamal	Forward	La Liga Player of the Month	
January
(Spain) Raphinha	Forward	IFFHS Men's Player of the Month	
(Spain) Joan Garcia	Goalkeeper	La Liga Save of the Month	
March
(Germany) Hansi Flick	Manager	La Liga Coach of the Month	
April
(Spain) Lamine Yamal	Forward	La Liga Player of the Month	
(Spain) Pau Cubarsí	Defender	La Liga U23 Player of the Month	
(England) Marcus Rashford	Forward	La Liga Goal of the Month	

=== Annual awards ===
Player	Position	Award	Ref.
(Spain) Pedri	Midfielder	Premi Barça Jugadors 2024–25 (2nd award – shared record)	
(Spain) Lamine Yamal	Forward	Kopa Trophy 2025 (2nd award)	
(Spain) Pedri	Midfielder	FIFPRO World 11 – Men's World XI 2025	
(Spain) Lamine Yamal	Forward	FIFPRO World 11 – Men's World XI 2025	
(Spain) Lamine Yamal	Forward	AFE Awards – Best Primera División player 2024–25	
(Spain) Lamine Yamal	Forward	Catalan Football Stars Gala – Best Men's Player (2025)	
(Spain) Pau Cubarsí	Defender	Catalan Football Stars Gala – Most Promising Men's Player (2025)	
(Spain) Lamine Yamal	Forward	IFFHS Men's World Best Youth Player 2025 (2nd award – shared record)	
(Spain) Pedri	Midfielder	2025 The Best FIFA Men's World 11	
(Spain) Lamine Yamal	Forward	2025 The Best FIFA Men's World 11	
(Spain) Pau Cubarsí	Defender	IFFHS Men's Youth (U20) World Team (2025)	
(Spain) Lamine Yamal	Forward	IFFHS Men's Youth (U20) World Team (2025)	
(Spain) Pedri	Midfielder	IFFHS Men's World Team (2025)	
(Spain) Lamine Yamal	Forward	IFFHS Men's World Team (2025)	
(Brazil) Raphinha	Forward	IFFHS Men’s CONMEBOL Team (2025)	
(Spain) Pedri	Midfielder	IFFHS Men's UEFA Team (2025)	
(Spain) Lamine Yamal	Forward	IFFHS Men's UEFA Team (2025)	
(Spain) Lamine Yamal	Forward	Memorial Aldo Rovira Award 2024–25 (2nd award)	
(Spain) Lamine Yamal	Forward	Laureus World Sports Award for Young Sportsperson of the Year (2026)	
(Spain) Joan Garcia	Goalkeeper	La Liga Team of the Season	
(Spain) Eric García	Defender	La Liga Team of the Season	
(Spain) Pau Cubarsí	Defender	La Liga Team of the Season	
(Spain) Pedri	Midfielder	La Liga Team of the Season	
(Spain) Fermín López	Midfielder	La Liga Team of the Season	
(Brazil) Raphinha	Forward	La Liga Team of the Season	
(Spain) Lamine Yamal	Forward	La Liga Team of the Season	
(Germany) Hansi Flick	Manager	La Liga Coach of the Season	
(Spain) Lamine Yamal	Forward	La Liga Player of the Season	
(Spain) Joan Garcia	Goalkeeper	La Liga Save of the Season	
