= Dro Fernández =

Spanish Filipino footballer (born 2008)

Personal information
- Full name: Pedro Fernández Sarmiento
- Date of birth: 12 January 2008 (age 18)
- Place of birth: Nigrán, Spain
- Height: 1.82 m (6 ft 0 in)
- Position: Central midfielder

Team information
- Current team: Paris Saint-Germain
- Number: 27

Youth career
- ED Val Miñor Nigrán
- 2022–2025: Barcelona

Senior career*
Years	Team	Apps	(Gls)
2025–2026	Barcelona B	3	(0)
2025–2026	Barcelona	4	(0)
2026–	Paris Saint-Germain	19	(1)

International career^{‡}
2022	Spain U15	8	(2)
2023	Spain U16	4	(0)
2024	Spain U17	9	(4)
2025–	Spain U18	3	(0)
2026–	Spain U19	3	(0)
- * Club domestic league appearances and goals as of 23:10, 7 November 2026 (UTC) ‡ National team caps and goals as of 07:01, 11 July 2026 (UTC)

Pedro Fernández Sarmiento (born 12 January 2008), also known as simply Dro, is a Spanish professional footballer who plays as a central midfielder for Ligue 1 club Paris Saint-Germain.

== Club career ==
=== Youth career ===
Dro joined Val Minor at the age of 4. Here he was coached by former Barcelona player and scout Jose Antonio Covelo.

Dro joined Barcelona's academy in 2022 rejecting offers from Real Madrid and Real Betis. In the 2024–25 season, he played for the Juvenil B and Juvenil A teams, as well as in the UEFA Youth League. He made a total of 38 appearances: 19 in Juvenil B (7 goals), 12 in Juvenil A (3 goals), and 7 in the UEFA Youth League (2 goals).

=== Barcelona ===
Dro is a graduate of the Barcelona football academy, known as La Masia. In July 2025, Dro was included in the Barcelona first team for the pre-season tour to Japan and South Korea under coach Hansi Flick. During the pre-season, he was subbed on for his debut and scored in the 87th minute to seal a 3–1 victory over Vissel Kobe. Later that year, on 28 September, he made his senior debut for the club in a 2–1 win over Real Sociedad. A month later, on 21 October, he made his UEFA Champions League debut and provided an assist in a 6–1 win over Olympiacos.

=== Paris Saint-Germain ===
On 26 January 2026, Dro signed for Ligue 1 club Paris Saint-Germain (PSG) on a contract until 2030. A transfer fee of €8.2 million was quoted in the media. On 8 February, he made his debut for the club as a substitute in a 5–0 win over Marseille. On 25 February, he played in his first Champions League match for the club as a substitute in a 2–2 draw against Monaco in the knockout phase play-offs, contributing to a 5–4 aggregate victory. On 21 March, Dro scored his first PSG goal in a 4–0 win over Nice, becoming the club's youngest goalscorer not from the PSG youth academy.

On 30 May 2026, he was an unused substitute who would win his first UEFA Champions League at 18 years old, making him one of the youngest players to win the UEFA Champions League.

== International career ==
Dro is a youth international for Galicia and Spain, having been called up to the Spain U17s for a set of 2025 UEFA European Under-17 Championship qualification matches in March 2025. In January 2026, the Philippine Football Federation publicly invited Dro to play for the Philippines.

== Personal life ==
Dro was born in Galicia, Spain to a Spanish father and a Filipino mother. His family was previously affected by events on 31 January 1992, when his grandfather, David Fernández, was among four people killed during a criminal attack at the family home. Dro's father, Pedro Fernández, survived the incident and later raised Dro in Galicia.

== Career statistics ==
As of match played 7 November 2026

Appearances and goals by club, season and competition
Club	Season	League			National cup		Europe		Other		Total	
Club	Season	Division	Apps	Goals	Apps	Goals	Apps	Goals	Apps	Goals	Apps	Goals
Barcelona B	2025–26	Segunda Federación	3	0	—		—		—		3	0
Barcelona	2025–26	La Liga	4	0	0	0	1 (Note: Appearance in UEFA Champions League)	0	0	0	5	0
Paris Saint-Germain	2025–26	Ligue 1	12	1	—		1	0	—		13	1
Paris Saint-Germain	2026–27	Ligue 1	7	0	0	0	1	0	1 (Note: Appearance in Trophée des Champions)	0	9	0
Paris Saint-Germain	Total		19	1	0	0	2	0	1	0	22	1
Career total			26	1	0	0	3	0	1	0	30	1

== Honours ==
Barcelona

- La Liga: 2025–26
- Supercopa de España: 2026

Paris Saint-Germain

- Ligue 1: 2025–26
- UEFA Champions League: 2025–26
- UEFA Super Cup: 2026
