= Marc Bernal =

Spanish footballer (born 2007)

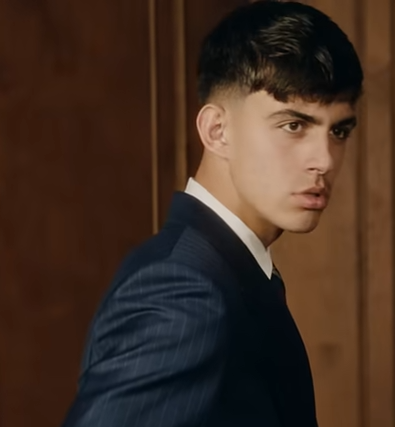
- Bernal in 2025

Personal information
- Full name: Marc Bernal Casas
- Date of birth: 26 May 2007 (age 19)
- Place of birth: Berga, Spain
- Height: 1.93 m (6 ft 4 in)
- Position: Defensive midfielder

Team information
- Current team: Barcelona
- Number: 22

Youth career
- 2011–2013: Berga
- 2013–2014: Gimnàstic Manresa
- 2014–2024: Barcelona

Senior career*
Years	Team	Apps	(Gls)
2023–2024	Barcelona B	27	(2)
2024–	Barcelona	36	(2)

International career^{‡}
2023–2024	Spain U17	11	(0)
2026–	Spain U21	2	(0)
2025–	Catalonia	1	(0)
2026–	Spain	1	(0)
- * Club domestic league appearances and goals as of 02:57, 17 September 2026 (UTC) ‡ National team caps and goals as of 23:46, 4 June 2026 (UTC)

Marc Bernal Casas (Catalan pronunciation: [ˈmaɾɡ bəɾˈnal ˈkazəs]; born 26 May 2007) is a Spanish professional footballer who plays as a defensive midfielder for La Liga club Barcelona and the Spain national team.

== Early life and education ==
He was born on 26 May 2007 in Berga, Barcelona, Catalonia, to Toni Bernal and Queralt Casas. He has an older brother, Toni, who studied law and business administration while coaching youth teams at CE Berga. His father, Toni, played football in the Catalan leagues during the 1990s for clubs like Sants and Júpiter, while his mother, Queralt, works for the Fundación Horitzó del Berguedà, an entity dedicated to the social and occupational inclusion of individuals with disabilities. Bernal's first language is Catalan: having grown up entirely in Catalonia and immersed in his native language and local culture, he communicates primarily in Catalan in his daily life.

During his school years, he balanced rigorous training commitments with his academic responsibilities. After entering FC Barcelona's La Masia academy at the age of six, support structures coordinated with the academy to help him manage his studies alongside his rapid progression through the youth ranks. Growing up alongside fellow talents of the "Class of 2007" such as Lamine Yamal and Pau Cubarsí, Bernal successfully balanced his education with his development into a first-team defensive midfielder.

== Club career ==
Born in Berga, Barcelona, Catalonia, Bernal is a youth product of CE Berga and Gimnàstic Manresa, and moved to La Masia at the age of 6 where he worked his way up their youth categories. On 23 June 2023, he signed his first professional contract with Barcelona until 2026. He made his senior and professional debut with Barcelona Atlètic in a 1–0 Primera Federación loss to Logroñés on 27 August. He scored his first professional goals with Barcelona Atlètic in a 3–1 win over Sestao on 22 October.

On 17 August 2024, he made his La Liga debut with Barcelona, by starting in a 2–1 away win over Valencia. Later that month, on 27 August, he suffered a ruptured anterior cruciate ligament (ACL) in his left knee in a 2–1 away win over Rayo Vallecano. A month later, on 30 September, Barcelona announced an adjustment to Bernal's contract by including a buyout clause of €500 million, binding him to the club until 30 June 2026 with an option to three more years.

Bernal made his return from his 383-day absence on 14 September 2025, in a 6–0 win over Valencia, getting an assist. Later that month, on 29 September, he extended his contract until 2029. On 7 February 2026, Bernal scored his first goal for the Blaugranas in a 3–0 win over Mallorca at the Camp Nou. A month later, on 18 March, he netted his first UEFA Champions League goal in a 7–2 win over Newcastle United during the competition's round of 16.

== International career ==
Bernal was called up to a training camp for the Spain U16s in October 2022. In August 2023, he was named to a training camp for the Spain U18s. He was named to the final squad for the Spain U17s at the 2023 FIFA U-17 World Cup.

He was named to the final squad for the Spain U17s at the 2024 UEFA European Under-17 Championship.

Bernal debuted with the Catalonia team in a friendly 2–1 win over Palestine on 18 November 2025.

In 2026, Bernal was called up to the Spanish national team's provisional squad ahead of the 2026 FIFA World Cup, but did not make the final squad. Consequently, he debuted on 4 June 2026 in a pre-tournament friendly against Iraq, at age 19.

== Style of play ==
Bernal is a 6'4'' versatile left-footed midfielder who usually plays as a defensive midfielder, but can also play more offensively if required. He has a robust physique, and has great passing skills. He is level headed and can pass well under pressure. He has also drawn the comparison of Sergio Busquets. Barcelona coach Hansi Flick has shown strong faith in his potential, making clear to the player that he remains his second-choice defensive midfielder and expressing continued confidence in his long-term role within the first team.

== Career statistics ==
=== Club ===
As of match played 22 November 2026

Appearances and goals by club, season and competition
Club	Season	League			Copa del Rey		Europe		Other		Total	
Club	Season	Division	Apps	Goals	Apps	Goals	Apps	Goals	Apps	Goals	Apps	Goals
Barcelona Atlètic	2023–24	Primera Federación	27	2	—		—		4 (Note: Appearances in Primera Federación play-offs)	0	31	2
Barcelona	2024–25	La Liga	3	0	0	0	0	0	0	0	3	0
Barcelona	2025–26	La Liga	22	2	4	2	6 (Note: Appearances in UEFA Champions League)	1	1 (Note: Appearance in Supercopa de España)	0	33	5
Barcelona	2026–27	La Liga	11	0	0	0	3 (Note: Appearances in UEFA Champions League)	0	0	0	14	0
Barcelona	Total		36	2	4	2	9	1	1	0	50	5
Career total			63	4	4	2	9	1	5	0	81	7

=== International ===
As of match played 4 June 2026

Appearances and goals by national team and year
National team	Year	Apps	Goals
Spain	2026	1	0
Total		1	0

== Honours ==
Barcelona

- La Liga: 2024–25, 2025–26
- Supercopa de España: 2026
