= Álvaro Cortés =

Spanish footballer

Personal information
- Full name: Álvaro Cortés Moyano
- Date of birth: 17 March 2005 (age 21)
- Place of birth: Zaragoza, Spain
- Height: 1.90 m (6 ft 3 in)
- Position: Centre-back

Team information
- Current team: Antwerp

Youth career
- 2010–2021: Zaragoza
- 2021–2023: Barcelona
- 2022–2023: → Damm (loan)

Senior career*
Years	Team	Apps	(Gls)
2023–2026	Barcelona B	58	(3)
2026	Barcelona	1	(0)
2026–	Antwerp	0	(0)

International career^{‡}
2021	Spain U17	2	(0)
2022–2023	Spain U18	3	(0)
2023	Spain U19	1	(0)
2025	Spain U20	3	(0)
- * Club domestic league appearances and goals as of 12:00, 14 May 2026 (UTC) ‡ National team caps and goals as of 21:50, 11 October 2025 (UTC)

Álvaro Cortés Moyano (born 17 March 2005) is a Spanish professional footballer who plays as a centre-back for Belgian Pro League team Antwerp.

== Club career ==
A youth product of his local club Real Zaragoza since just before he turned 5, Cortés was promoted to their U19 team at the age of 15. He moved to the youth academy of Barcelona in 2021 on a free transfer. He spent the 2022–23 season on loan with the U19s of Damm and was promoted to Barcelona Atlètic on his return in the summer of 2023. On 27 June 2024, he extended his contract with Barcelona Atlètic until 2026. On 11 November 2024, he made the matchday squad for the first time for the senior Barcelona team in a La Liga match against Celta de Vigo. On 10 May 2026, he won his first title with the senior team after a 2-0 win against Real Madrid.

Cortés made his debut for Barcelona's senior team on 13 May 2026 in a La Liga match against Deportivo Alavés, starting the game.

On 1 September 2026, Cortés joined Belgian Pro League club Antwerp on a four-year contract.

== International career ==
Cortés is a youth international for Spain, having played up to the Spain U19s. He had to pull out of a set of U19 matches in October 2023 due to a knee injury.

On 27 September 2025, Cortés was called up to the Spain U20 squad for the 2025 FIFA U-20 World Cup in Chile as an injury replacement for Jon Martín.

== Style of play ==
Cortés is a left-footed centre-back who stands out for his ability to win duels and control the defensive space. He is aggressive, shows great positioning and is a leader on the pitch.

== Career statistics ==
=== Club ===
As of match played 13 May 2026

Appearances and goals by club, season and competition
Club	Season	League			National cup		Other		Total	
Club	Season	Division	Apps	Goals	Apps	Goals	Apps	Goals	Apps	Goals
Barcelona B	2023–24	Primera Federación	1	0	—		—		1	0
Barcelona B	2024–25	Primera Federación	30	0	—		—		30	0
Barcelona B	2025–26	Segunda Federación	27	3	—		1 (Note: Appearance in Copa Catalunya)	0	28	3
Barcelona B	Total		58	3	0	0	1	0	59	3
Barcelona	2025–26	La Liga	1	0	—		—		1	0
Career total			59	3	0	0	1	0	60	3

== Honours ==
Barcelona

- UEFA Youth League: 2024–25
- La Liga: 2025–26
