= Roony Bardghji =

Sweden international footballer (born 2005)

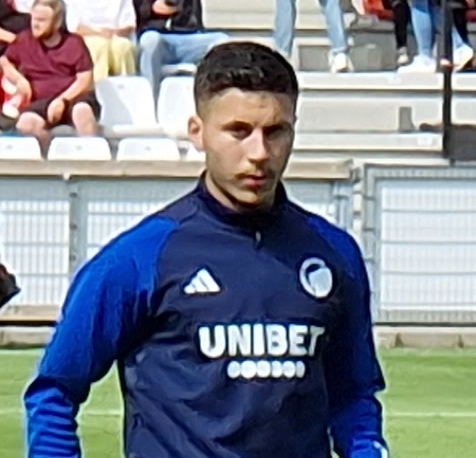
- Bardghji with Copenhagen in 2023

Personal information
- Date of birth: 15 November 2005 (age 20)
- Place of birth: Kuwait City, Kuwait
- Height: 1.73 m (5 ft 8 in)
- Position: Winger

Team information
- Current team: Barcelona
- Number: 19

Youth career
- 2012–2015: Kallinge SK
- 2015–2018: Rödeby AIF
- 2019–2020: Malmö FF
- 2020–2021: Copenhagen

Senior career*
Years	Team	Apps	(Gls)
2021–2025	Copenhagen	60	(12)
2025–	Barcelona	21	(1)

International career^{‡}
2021	Sweden U17	6	(5)
2022–2025	Sweden U21	12	(3)
2025–	Sweden	3	(0)
- * Club domestic league appearances and goals as of 16:15, 17 May 2026 (UTC) ‡ National team caps and goals as of 19:39, 20 November 2025 (UTC)

Roony Bardghji (Note: Arabic: روني بَردَغْجي, romanized: Rūnī Bardaghjī, Aleppo Arabic pronunciation [roːni bærdæɣd͡ʒi]; Armenian: Ռունի Բարդաղջի, Western Armenian: Ռունի Պարտաղճի, romanized: R’uni Bardaghji, pronounced [ruˈni bɑɾdɑʁˈd͡ʒi]) (born 15 November 2005) is a professional footballer who plays as a right winger for La Liga club Barcelona. Born in Kuwait, he plays for the Sweden national team.

== Early life ==
Bardghji was born in Kuwait to an Assyrian family from Aleppo, Syria. He is of Armenian descent through his paternal grandfather. His family moved to Kallinge, Sweden, for better opportunities when he was 6 years old.

== Club career ==
Arriving in Sweden in 2012, Bardghji played for youth teams of Kallinge SK, Rödeby AIF and Malmö FF.

=== Copenhagen ===
On 15 November 2020, he moved from Malmö FF to Copenhagen. On 21 November 2021, he made his senior debut for Copenhagen against AGF in the Danish Superliga, becoming the youngest player to feature at the club, aged 16 years and 6 days, breaking the previous record held by Kenneth Zohore. Seven days later, he scored his first goal for Copenhagen in a 3–1 win against AaB, making him the youngest goalscorer in Danish Superliga history.

On 25 October 2022, Bardghji made his UEFA Champions League debut, coming off the bench in the 62nd minute, in a 3–0 defeat against Sevilla. On 7 January 2023, he signed a new contract, extending until December 2025.

On 8 November 2023, Bardghji scored the first Champions League goal of his career—an 87th minute winner in a 4–3 win over Manchester United. In May 2024, he sustained a serious knee injury during training which would sideline him for 9 to 12 months. He made his return to action on 31 March 2025, coming on as a substitute in a 1–0 victory over Randers, following a 334-day absence.

=== Barcelona ===
On 14 July 2025, Bardghji signed a four-year contract with La Liga side Barcelona, completing a deal for €2 million, with performance-related add-ons. Bardghji was initially registered with Barcelona Atlètic but did not play any matches with the reserve team.

Later that year, on 14 September, he made his debut for Barcelona in a 6–0 victory over Valencia. A month later, on 21 October, he recorded his first assist for the club in a 6–1 win over Olympiacos in the Champions League. Later that year, on 6 December, he scored his first La Liga goal in a 5–3 away win against Real Betis.

In the 2026 Supercopa de España, Bardghji scored a goal and provided two assists in the semi-final against Athletic Bilbao. He went on to win the 2026 Supercopa de España after Barcelona won the final against Real Madrid. Prior to the Supercopa de España final, Bardghji was registered as a first team player and given the number 19.

In early August 2026, Bardghji suffered an ACL injury to his right knee during pre-season training, ruling him out for several months.

== International career ==
Bardghji made his international debut for the Sweden U17 team on 7 August 2021. He also played for the Sweden U21 team, with his debut on 2 June 2022.

On 1 October 2025, Bardghji was called up to the Sweden national football team for the first time. On 10 October 2025, Bardghji made his first appearance for the national team in the 85th minute of a 2–0 loss against Switzerland in the 2026 UEFA World cup qualifiers.

== Career statistics ==
=== Club ===
As of match played 17 May 2026

Appearances and goals by club, season and competition
Club	Season	League			National cup (Note: Includes Danish Cup, Copa del Rey)		Europe		Other		Total	
Club	Season	Division	Apps	Goals	Apps	Goals	Apps	Goals	Apps	Goals	Apps	Goals
Copenhagen	2021–22	Danish Superliga	13	2	0	0	2 (Note: Appearances in UEFA Europa Conference League)	0	—		15	2
Copenhagen	2022–23	Danish Superliga	19	3	6	0	2 (Note: Appearances in UEFA Champions League)	0	—		27	3
Copenhagen	2023–24	Danish Superliga	23	7	4	2	9	1	—		36	10
Copenhagen	2024–25	Danish Superliga	5	0	1	0	0	0	—		6	0
Copenhagen	Total		60	12	11	2	13	1	—		84	15
Barcelona	2025–26	La Liga	21	1	1	0	5	0	1 (Note: Appearance in Supercopa de España)	1	28	2
Barcelona	2026–27	La Liga	0	0	0	0	0	0	0	0	0	0
Barcelona	Total		21	1	1	0	5	0	1	1	28	2
Career total			81	13	12	2	18	1	1	1	112	17

=== International ===
As of match played 18 November 2025

Appearances and goals by national team and year
National team	Year	Apps	Goals
Sweden	2025	3	0
Total		3	0

== Honours ==
Copenhagen

- Danish Superliga: 2021–22, 2022–23, 2024–25
- Danish Cup: 2022–23, 2024–25

Barcelona

- La Liga: 2025–26
- Supercopa de España: 2026

Individual

- Superliga Team of the Month: August 2023, September 2023
