= Eder Aller =

Spanish footballer (born 2008)

Personal information
- Full name: Eder Aller González
- Date of birth: 4 April 2007 (age 19)
- Place of birth: León, Spain
- Height: 1.94 m (6 ft 4 in)
- Position: Goalkeeper

Team information
- Current team: Barcelona B
- Number: 1

Youth career
- 2017–2021: Cultural Leonesa
- 2021–2022: Marcet
- 2022–2025: Barcelona

Senior career*
Years	Team	Apps	(Gls)
2024–	Barcelona B	2	(0)

International career^{‡}
2024–	Spain U18	2	(0)
- * Club domestic league appearances and goals as of 14:41, 26 September 2025 (UTC) ‡ National team caps and goals as of 14:41, 26 September 2025 (UTC)

Eder Aller González (born 4 April 2007) is a Spanish professional footballer who plays as a goalkeeper for Segunda Federación club Barcelona Atlètic.

== Club career ==
A youth product of Cultural Leonesa's academy since the age of 10, Aller had a brief stint with the Marcet academy in 2021 before joining Barcelona's famed youth set-up on 4 August 2022.

In March 2023 at the age of 15, he was called up to senior training with Barcelona's first team squad. He made his debut with Barcelona Atlètic on 6 October 2024, in a 2–2 Primera Federación draw with Sestao River, and at 17 was the youngest goalkeeper to debut in the competition.

On 25 September 2025, he was called up to the matchday squad for Barcelona's first team for a La Liga match against Real Oviedo.

== International career ==
Aller was first called up to the Spain U18s for the "4 Nations International Tournament" in October 2024.

== Career statistics ==
=== Club ===
As of match played 26 September 2025

Appearances and goals by club, season and competition
Club	Season	League			National cup		Europe		Other		Total	
Club	Season	Division	Apps	Goals	Apps	Goals	Apps	Goals	Apps	Goals	Apps	Goals
Barcelona B	2024–25	Primera Federación	1	0	—		—		—		1	0
Barcelona B	2025–26	Segunda Federación	1	0	—		—		—		1	0
Barcelona B	Total		2	0	—		—		—		2	0
Barcelona	2025–26	La Liga	0	0	0	0	0	0	0	0	0	0
Career total			2	0	0	0	0	0	0	0	2	0

== Honours ==
Barcelona

- UEFA Youth League: 2024–25
