= Jofre Torrents =

Spanish footballer (born 2007)

Personal information
- Full name: Jofre Torrents Salvat
- Date of birth: 28 January 2007 (age 19)
- Place of birth: La Selva del Camp, Spain
- Height: 1.85 m (6 ft 1 in)
- Position: Left-back

Team information
- Current team: Ajax
- Number: 21

Youth career
- La Selva del Camp
- Reus
- 2018–2025: Barcelona

Senior career*
Years	Team	Apps	(Gls)
2025–2026	Barcelona B	26	(1)
2025–2026	Barcelona	3	(0)
2026–	Ajax	1	(0)

International career^{‡}
2022	Spain U15	2	(0)
2022–2023	Spain U16	5	(0)
2023	Spain U17	2	(0)
2025–	Spain U19	3	(0)
Medal record
Men's football
Representing Spain
UEFA European Under-19 Championship
Runner-up	2025 Romania
- * Club domestic league appearances and goals as of 30 August 2026 ‡ National team caps and goals as of 26 June 2025

Jofre Torrents Salvat (born 28 January 2007) is a Spanish professional footballer who plays as a left-back for Eredivisie club Ajax.

== Club career ==
Born in La Selva del Camp, Tarragona, Catalonia, Torrents joined the youth ranks of Barcelona in 2018. On 16 June 2023, he signed his first professional contract with Barcelona. In September 2023 he suffered a knee injury in an international match that kept him out for the entire season, but upon his return, he was promoted to the U19s for the 2024–25 season. He made his senior debut with Barcelona Atlètic in a 1–1 Primera Federación draw with Tarazona on 15 March 2025. On 16 August 2025, he made his official senior debut for Barça's first team in their first La Liga match of the season in a 3–0 away win against Mallorca.

On 17 August 2026, Barcelona and Ajax reached an agreement for the transfer of Torrents to Amsterdam with a reported fee of €6 million.

== International career ==
Torrents is a youth international for Spain. In September 2023, he played for the Spain U17s and suffered an injury that set him back a season. In January 2025, he was called up to the Spain U18s, but had to drop out of the side due to an injury.

== Playing style ==
Torrents is a left-back who makes runs against his opposition and is capable of delivering crosses and passes. He has been described as strong and adept in one-on-one situations, and as a promising talent.

== Career statistics ==
As of match played 15 October 2026

Appearances and goals by club, season and competition
Club	Season	League			Cup		Europe		Other		Total	
Club	Season	Division	Apps	Goals	Apps	Goals	Apps	Goals	Apps	Goals	Apps	Goals
Barcelona B	2024–25	Primera Federación	11	0	—		—		—		11	0
Barcelona B	2025–26	Segunda Federación	15	1	—		—		—		15	1
Barcelona B	Total		26	1	—		—		—		26	1
Barcelona	2025–26	La Liga	3	0	1	0	0	0	0	0	4	0
Ajax	2026–27	Eredivisie	1	0	0	0	1 (Note: Appearances in UEFA Conference League)	0	—		2	0
Ajax	Total		1	0	0	0	1	0	—		2	0
Career total			30	1	1	0	1	0	0	0	32	1

== Honours ==
Barcelona

- La Liga: 2025–26

Barcelona U19

- UEFA Youth League: 2024–25

Spain U19

- UEFA European Under-19 Championship runner-up: 2025
