= Tommy Marqués =

Spanish footballer (born 2006)

Personal information
- Full name: Tomás Noël Marqués Morera
- Date of birth: 30 October 2006 (age 20)
- Place of birth: Barcelona, Spain
- Height: 1.86 m (6 ft 1 in)
- Position: Defensive midfielder

Team information
- Current team: Braga
- Number: 16

Youth career
- –2015: Europa
- 2015–2025: Barcelona
- 2023–2024: → Damm (loan)

Senior career*
Years	Team	Apps	(Gls)
2025–2026	Barcelona B	22	(0)
2026	Barcelona	2	(0)
2026–	Braga	6	(0)

International career
2025	Spain U19	4	(1)
Medal record
Men's football
Representing Spain
UEFA European Under-19 Championship
Runner-up	2025 Romania
- * Club domestic league appearances and goals as of 25 October 2026

Tomás Noël Marqués Morera (born 30 October 2006) better known as Tommy Marqués, is a Spanish professional footballer who plays as a defensive midfielder for Primeira Liga club Braga.

== Club career ==
Born in Barcelona, Catalonia, Marqués joined the youth setup of FC Barcelona from CE Europa in 2015. In the 2024–25 season, Marqués won the treble with the under-19 side, afterwards extending his contract with the club and being promoted to Barcelona Atlètic. On 7 February 2026, Marqués made his senior debut for Barça in a LaLiga home match against Mallorca, coming on in the 86th minute for Fermín López.

On 21 August 2026, Marqués joined to the first-tier Portuguese club Braga for €11M and €1M in variables, signing a contract for five years.

== International career ==
Marqués has represented Spain at the under-19 level. In June 2025, he was named in the squad for the UEFA European Under-19 Championship in Romania. He played in three matches at the tournament, scoring a goal against Germany, as his team reached the final, where they lost to the Netherlands.

== Career statistics ==
As of match played 25 October 2026

Appearances and goals by club, season and competition
Club	Season	League			Cup		Europe		Other		Total	
Club	Season	Division	Apps	Goals	Apps	Goals	Apps	Goals	Apps	Goals	Apps	Goals
Barcelona B	2025–26	Segunda Federación	22	0	—		—		—		22	0
Barcelona	2025–26	La Liga	2	0	0	0	0	0	0	0	2	0
Braga	2026–27	Primeira Liga	6	0	0	0	0	0	0	0	6	0
Total			30	0	0	0	0	0	0	0	30	0

== Honours ==
Barcelona

- La Liga: 2025–26

Barcelona U19

- UEFA Youth League: 2024–25

Spain U19

- UEFA European Under-19 Championship runner-up: 2025
