= Pau Cubarsí =

Spanish footballer (born 2007)

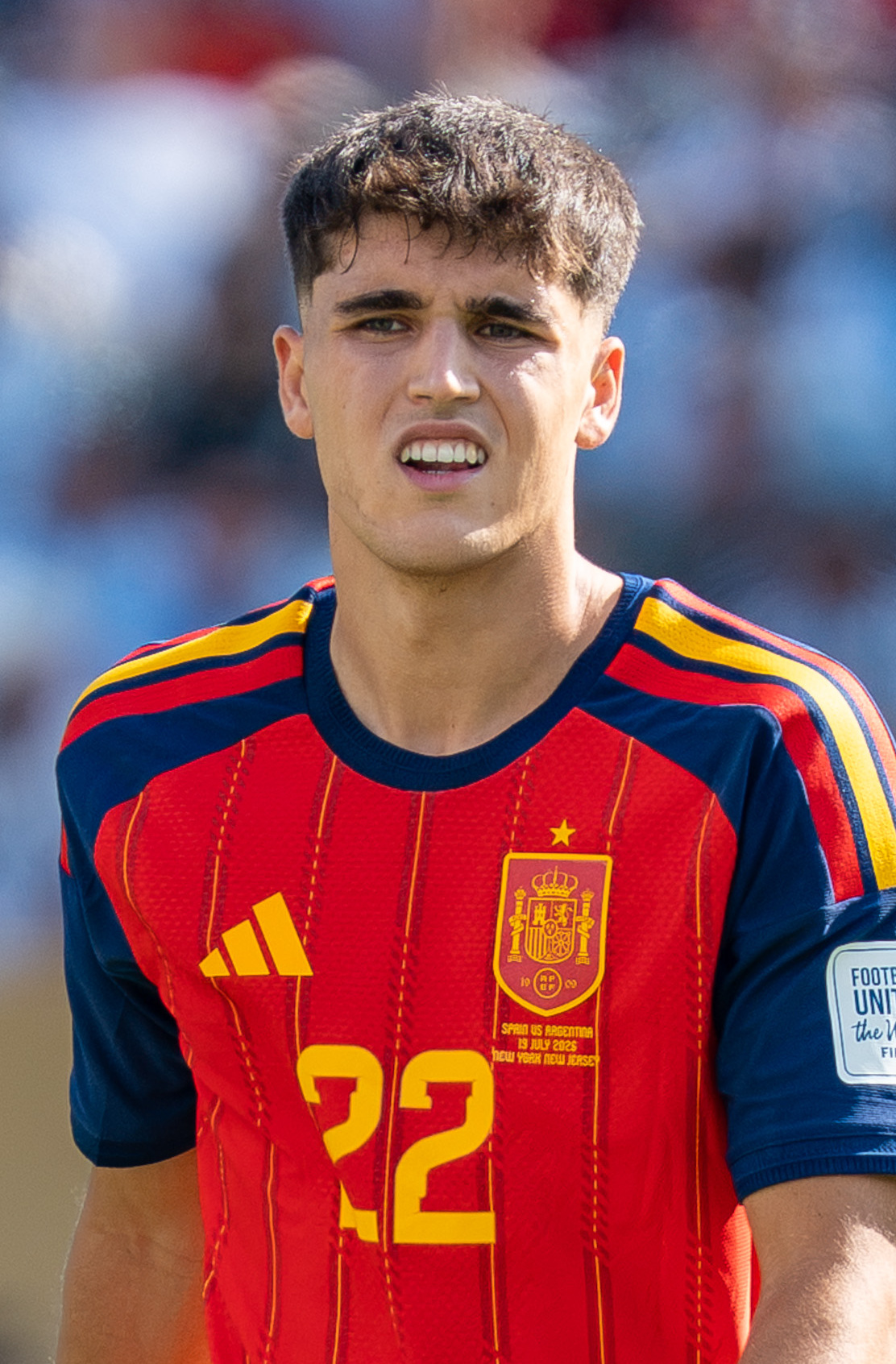
- Cubarsí with Spain in 2026

Personal information
- Full name: Pau Cubarsí Paredes
- Date of birth: 22 January 2007 (age 19)
- Place of birth: Bescanó, Spain
- Height: 1.83 m (6 ft 0 in)
- Position: Centre-back

Team information
- Current team: Barcelona
- Number: 5

Youth career
- 2014–2018: Girona
- 2018–2024: Barcelona

Senior career*
Years	Team	Apps	(Gls)
2023–2024	Barcelona B	9	(0)
2023–	Barcelona	94	(1)

International career^{‡}
2021–2022	Spain U15	6	(1)
2022	Spain U16	4	(1)
2022–2023	Spain U17	18	(0)
2024	Spain U21	2	(0)
2024	Spain U23	5	(0)
2024–	Spain	25	(0)
Medal record
Men's football
Representing Spain
FIFA World Cup
Winner	2026 Canada–Mexico–US
UEFA Nations League
Runner-up	2025 Germany
Olympic Games
Gold medal – first place	2024 Paris	Team
- * Club domestic league appearances and goals as of 21:07, 8 November 2026 (UTC) ‡ National team caps and goals as of 22:05, 15 November 2026 (UTC)

Pau Cubarsí Paredes (born 22 January 2007) is a Spanish professional footballer who plays as a centre-back for La Liga club Barcelona and the Spain national team.

Formerly a Girona youth player, Cubarsí transitioned into being a La Masia talent, and he later made his senior debut for Barcelona on 18 January 2024, just days before his 17th birthday. He later won La Liga in 2025 and 2026 with the club.

A former Spain youth international, Cubarsí represented his country at every youth level from under-15 to under-23 level. In March 2024, he made his senior debut for Spain in a friendly against Colombia at the age of 17. Cubarsí went on to become a key member of the squad that won the 2026 FIFA World Cup, playing every minute of Spain's campaign and being named the tournament's Best Young Player.

== Early life and education ==
Pau Cubarsí Paredes was born on 22 January 2007 in Bescanó, Girona, Catalonia, to Robert Cubarsí Vilaró and Gloria Paredes Parra. He has an older sister, Irene, who is a physiotherapist. He grew up in the small village of Estanyol in Bescanó, where four generations of his father's family had operated the family carpentry business, Fusteria Cubarsí, since 1905. Cubarsí is a great-great-grand-nephew of the painter Ginés Parra.

Cubarsí's first language is Catalan. While playing for Spain at the Olympic Games in 2024, he said that he rarely gave interviews because he was not fluent in Spanish, having only ever lived in Catalonia and used his native language.

When attending high school, he trained in the morning and attended classes from 3 p.m. Teachers from Lleó XIII school (Note: Escuela or Escola Lleó XIII in Barcelona) would go to La Masia (football academy in Barcelona) and give classes until eight in the evening. If he missed the class owing to games, he would ask for notes, or just pay extra attention the following day. After graduation from high school, he sat university entrance exams and was due to begin a university degree in business administration and management in September 2025. He planned to leave his residence at La Masia, where he had lived through his teenage years, and share an apartment with his sister in Barcelona.

== Club career ==
=== Early career ===
Cubarsí began his career with Girona, before moving to Barcelona in 2018. Having progressed through the academy, he became the third-youngest Barcelona player to debut in the UEFA Youth League, behind Lamine Yamal and Ilaix Moriba, when he started in an eventual 1–1 draw with Czech side Viktoria Plzeň.

=== Barcelona ===
In April 2023, Cubarsí trained with the first team for the first time, having been called up by manager Xavi. He signed his first professional contract with the club three months later, on 8 July. He was included in Barcelona's pre-season squad ahead of the 2023–24 season.

On 18 January 2024, Cubarsí made his first-team debut against Unionistas de Salamanca in the Copa del Rey, being subbed on in the 46th minute. His first start came in the next match against Real Betis in La Liga, a day before his 17th birthday. Two months later, on 12 March, he was named Player of the Match on his UEFA Champions League debut in a 3–1 victory over Napoli in the round of 16 second leg, in which he became the youngest player to debut at 17 years and 50 days in the competition's knockout phase, breaking former Bayern Munich defender David Alaba's previous record of 17 years and 258 days. On 10 April, Cubarsí has become the youngest defender to start in the quarter-finals of the Champions League aged only 17 years and 79 days breaking the previous record held by CSKA Moscow's Georgi Shchennikov. On 9 May, Barcelona announced that they had reached an agreement with Cubarsí for an extension until 30 June 2029, which has a 500 million euro buyout clause.

On 25 February 2025, Cubarsí headed in his first goal for Barcelona, in a Copa del Rey semi-final against Atlético Madrid which ended in a 4–4 draw.

On 7 January 2026, Cubarsí started in Barcelona's 5–0 win over Athletic Bilbao in the 2026 Supercopa de España semi‑final, earning praise for a composed display in defense on a big stage. In the first leg of the 2025–26 UEFA Champions League quarter-finals against Atlético Madrid on 8 April, Cubarsí was sent off after a VAR review overturned his initial yellow card in the 43rd minute, with Julián Alvarez converting the resulting free kick as Barcelona lost 2–0. At the end of the season, ESPN ranked Cubarsi fourth-best centre-back, in their annual list of Best Male Footballers in the World.

== International career ==
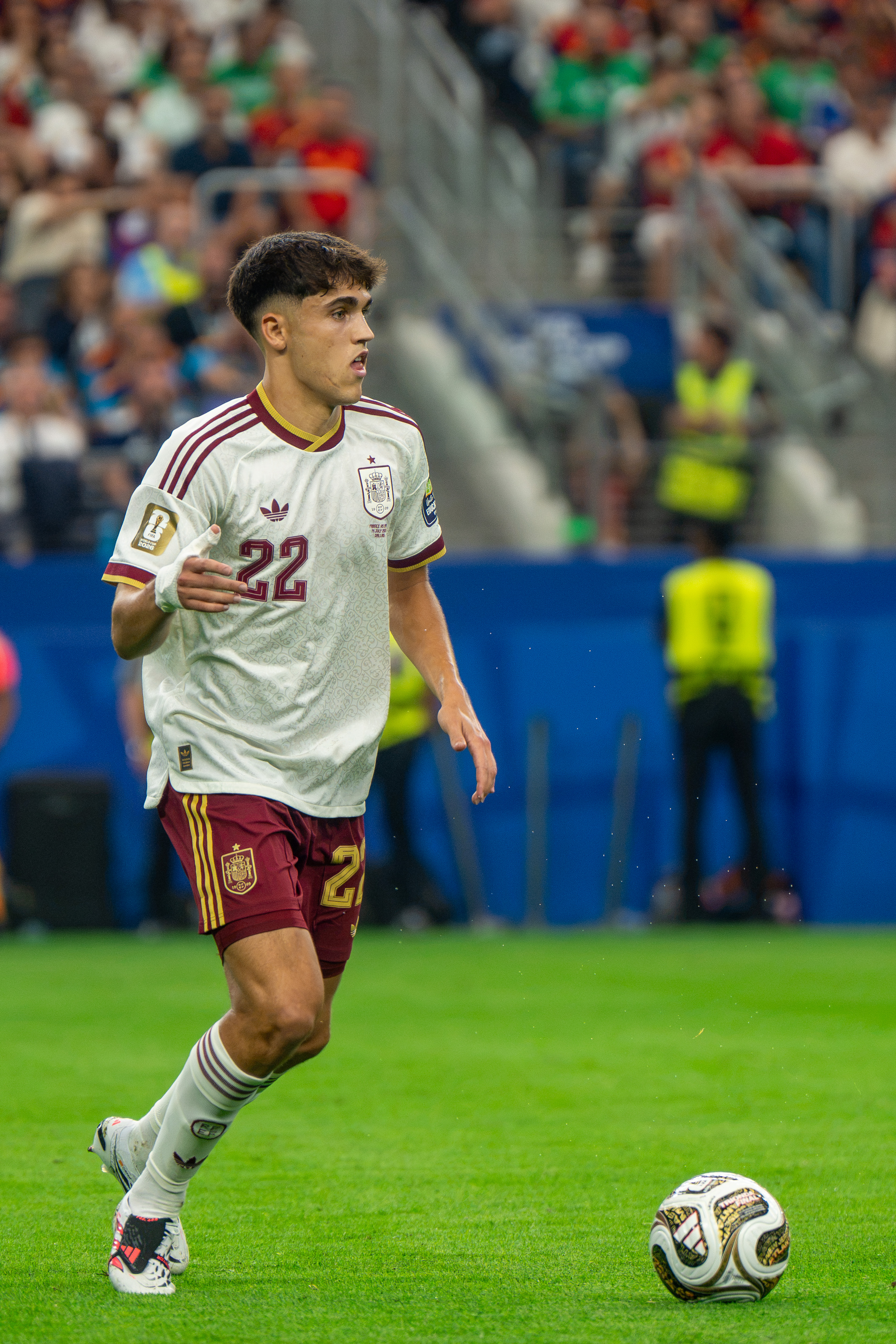
Cubarsí playing for Spain against France in the 2026 FIFA World Cup semi-finals

Cubarsí has represented Spain from under-15 to senior level. In March 2024, he was called up to the senior Spain team for the first time by coach Luis de la Fuente, debuting in a 1–0 friendly loss to Colombia. He came on as a substitute in the 83rd minute replacing Aymeric Laporte, he became the youngest defender to ever play for Spain at the age of 17 years one month and 28 days, breaking the record previously held by Sergio Ramos in 2005.

On 27 May 2024, Cubarsí was named in the 29-man preliminary squad for the UEFA Euro 2024. However, on 7 June, he was excluded from the final squad prior to the tournament. In July 2024, Cubarsí was selected in the Spain under-23 squad for the 2024 Summer Olympics. He and Spain would go on to win the Olympic gold medal at the men's football event in the Olympics.

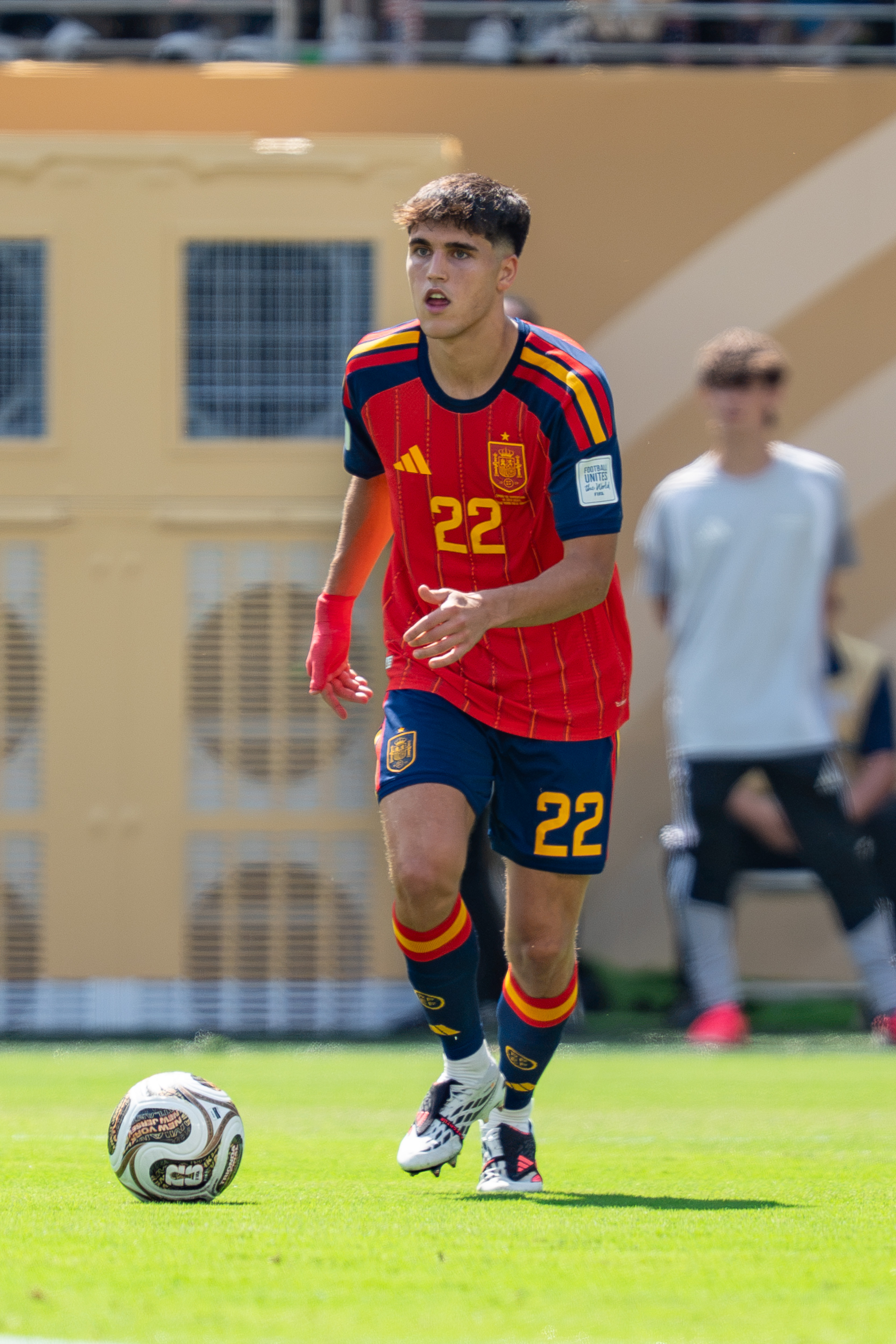
Cubarsí with Spain against Argentina at the 2026 World Cup final

On 25 May 2026, he was included in Spain's 26-man squad for the 2026 FIFA World Cup. Following Spain's 1–0 extra-time victory over defending champions Argentina in the final, Cubarsí won the Young Player of the Tournament Award. He is best remembered for a providential 120th-minute clearance denying Argentina's Marcos Senesi, which secured Spain's victory in the final.

At 19 years and 178 days old, he became the fourth-youngest player to feature in a World Cup final, behind only Pelé, Giuseppe Bergomi and his teammate Lamine Yamal. He completed the second-most passes throughout the tournament, after compatriot Rodri – 668 out of 690 attempted – with a 97% passing accuracy. Moreover, with 121 passes in the final, he became one of only three players, aside from compatriot Rodri (101) in the same match, and Brazil's Dunga in 1994 (130), to complete over 100 passes in a World Cup final. During the 2026 World Cup, Cubarsí and Spain also set new defensive records for the most clean sheets (seven) and fewest goals conceded (one) in a single edition of the tournament by a World Cup champion.

== Player profile ==
=== Style of play ===
Cubarsí is regarded as one of the most promising centre-backs of his generation, noted for his composure, anticipation, and ability in possession. A ball-playing defender, he has been praised for reading the game "like a veteran" despite his young age, while his progressive passing and positional awareness make him well suited to teams that play a high defensive line.

=== Reception ===
In July 2025, Sports Illustrated and ESPN ranked Cubarsí as the ninth-best and sixth-best centre-back in world football, respectively. Former Barcelona midfielder and coach Óscar García said in July 2026 that he expects Cubarsí to become "one of the top five centre-backs in history", praising Cubarsí's one-on-one defending and ability to eliminate opponents with his passing.

== Career statistics ==
=== Club ===
As of match played 8 November 2026

Appearances and goals by club, season and competition
Club	Season	League			Copa del Rey		Europe		Other		Total	
Club	Season	Division	Apps	Goals	Apps	Goals	Apps	Goals	Apps	Goals	Apps	Goals
Barcelona Atlètic	2023–24	Primera Federación	9	0	—		—		—		9	0
Barcelona	2023–24	La Liga	19	0	2	0	3 (Note: Appearances in UEFA Champions League)	0	0	0	24	0
Barcelona	2024–25	La Liga	35	0	6	1	13	0	2 (Note: Appearances in Supercopa de España)	0	56	1
Barcelona	2025–26	La Liga	31	1	5	0	10	0	2	0	48	1
Barcelona	2026–27	La Liga	9	0	0	0	4	0	0	0	13	0
Barcelona	Total		94	1	13	1	30	0	4	0	141	2
Career total			103	1	13	1	30	0	4	0	150	2

=== International ===
As of match played 15 November 2026

Appearances and goals by national team and year
National team	Year	Apps	Goals
Spain	2024	5	0
Spain	2025	5	0
Spain	2026	15	0
Total		25	0

== Honours ==
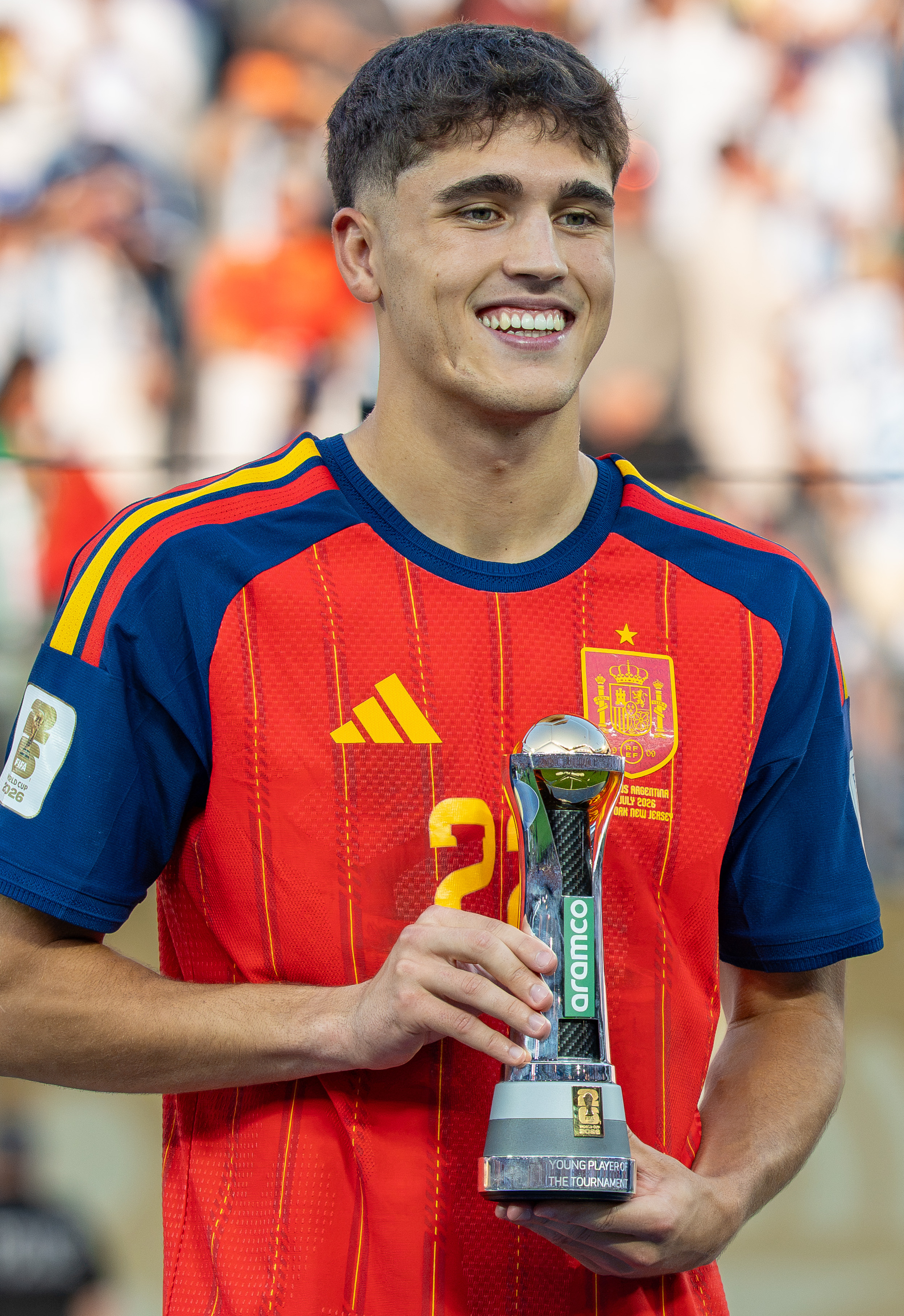
Cubarsí holding the 2026 FIFA World Cup Young Player Award

Barcelona

- La Liga: 2024–25, 2025–26
- Copa del Rey: 2024–25
- Supercopa de España: 2025, 2026

Spain U23

- Olympic Gold Medal: 2024

Spain

- FIFA World Cup: 2026
- UEFA Nations League runner-up: 2024–25

Individual

- Golden Boy: 2026
- FIFA World Cup Young Player Award: 2026
- La Liga Team of the Season: 2024–25, 2025–26
- La Liga U23 Player of the Month: March 2024, April 2026
- IFFHS Men's Youth (U20) World Team: 2024
- IFFHS Men's Youth (U20) UEFA Team: 2024
- Barça Players' Award: 2025–26
- Memorial Aldo Rovira Award: 2025–26
- FIFPRO World 11: 2026
