= 2026 FC Barcelona presidential election =

- 15 March 2026
- Turnout: 42.34% (▼8.1pp)
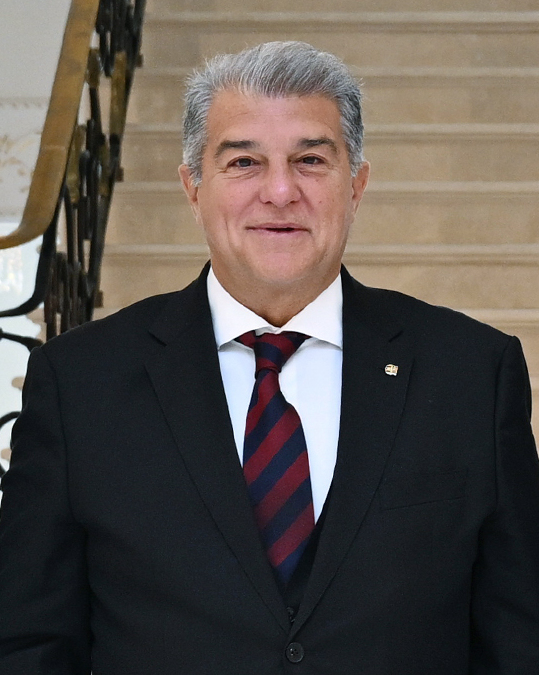

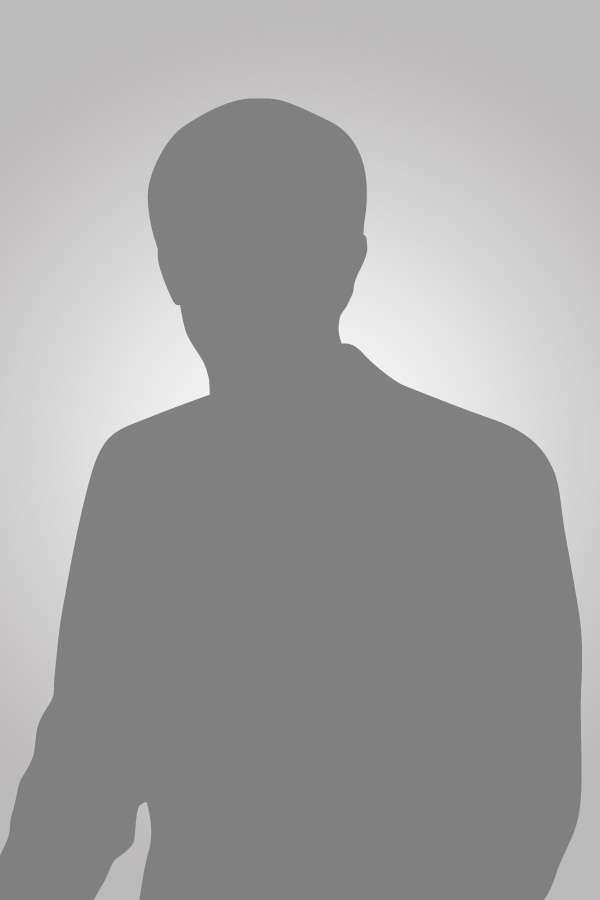
| Candidate | Joan Laporta | Víctor Font |
| Alliance | Defensem el Barça | Nosaltres Barça |
| Popular vote | 32,934 | 14,385 |
| Percentage | 68.18% | 29.78% |
| Swing | ▲13.9 pp | ▼0.2 pp |
President before election
Rafa Yuste (interim)
Joan Laporta
Elected President
Joan Laporta

The 2026 FC Barcelona presidential election took place on 15 March 2026 for electing the President of the club. Incumbent president Joan Laporta won the re-election for the second consecutive and fourth overall term in office, defeating Victor Font.

== Electoral calendar ==
The electoral calendar was the following:

- 9 February: publication of the official call for elections.
- 10 February: public draw to select the members of the Electoral Board and the Electoral Committee.
- 13 or 14 February: formal constitution of the Electoral Board and the Electoral Committee.
- From 15 February: endorsement slips may be requested.
- 15–19 February: publication of the electoral roll.
- Between 20 and 22 February: resolution of claims and approval of the final electoral roll.
- 23 February to 2 March: submission of proposed candidacies.
- Between 3 and 5 March: counting of endorsements and announcement of candidates who obtain support from at least 50% of the members of the Assembly.
- 6–13 March: election campaign.
- 14 March: reflection day.
- 15 March: voting day.

== Candidates ==
6 pre candidates ran for the presidency. These include incumbent president Joan Laporta, Catalan fintech entrepreneur and 2021 candidate Víctor Font, former club executive and head of La Masia Xavi Vilajoana, local businessman Marc Ciria, Daniel Juan and William Maddock. In order to advance to the main election the candidates had to collect a minimum of 2,337 signatures from club members. Candidates who collected a minimum number of signatures are Laporta, Font, and Ciria. However, only Laporta and Font were allowed to run for president, as only 2,247 of Ciria's 2,845 signatures were validated after the recount.

== Results ==
| Candidate | Votes | % |
|---|---|---|
| Joan Laporta | 32,934 | 69.60 |
| Víctor Font | 14,385 | 30.40 |
| Total | 47,319 | 100.00 |
| Valid votes | 47,319 | 97.61 |
| Invalid votes | 984 | 2.03 |
| Blank votes | 177 | 0.37 |
| Total votes | 48,480 | 100.00 |
| Registered voters/turnout | 114,504 | 42.34 |
Source: https://www.fcbarcelona.cat/ca/eleccions-2026

== See also ==
- History of FC Barcelona
- List of FC Barcelona presidents
