= 2026 Supercopa de España =

Spanish football competition played in Saudi Arabia

Tournament details
- Host country: Saudi Arabia
- Dates: 7–11 January 2026
- Teams: 4
- Venue: 1 (in 1 host city)

Final positions
- Champions: Barcelona (16th title)
- Runners-up: Real Madrid

Tournament statistics
- Matches played: 3
- Goals scored: 13 (4.33 per match)
- Attendance: 166,118 (55,373 per match)
- Top scorer: Raphinha (4 goals)

The 2026 Supercopa de España was the 42nd edition of the Supercopa de España, an annual football competition for clubs in the Spanish football league system that were successful in its major competitions in the preceding season.

Barcelona won the tournament for their record-extending sixteenth Supercopa de España title.

== Qualification ==
The tournament was to feature the winners and runners-up of the 2024–25 Copa del Rey and 2024–25 La Liga. As the top two league finishers were also the cup finalists, the remaining spots were filled by the league's third and fourth placed clubs, the first occurrence of this scenario since the introduction of the four-team format in 2020.

=== Qualified teams ===
The following four teams qualified for the tournament.

Team	Method of qualification	Appearance	Last appearance as	Previous performance		
Team	Method of qualification	Appearance	Last appearance as	Winner(s)	Runners-up	Semi-finalists
Barcelona	2024–25 La Liga and 2024–25 Copa del Rey winners	30th	2025 winners	15	12	2
Real Madrid	2024–25 La Liga and 2024–25 Copa del Rey runners-up	22nd	2025 runners-up	13	7	1
Atlético Madrid	2024–25 La Liga third place	10th	2024 semi-finalists	2	5	2
Athletic Bilbao	2024–25 La Liga fourth place	8th	2025 semi-finalists	3	3	1

== Venue ==
All three matches were held at the King Abdullah Sports City Stadium in Jeddah, Saudi Arabia.

Location of the host city of the 2026 Supercopa de España.	City	Stadium
Location of the host city of the 2026 Supercopa de España.	Jeddah	King Abdullah Sports City Stadium
Location of the host city of the 2026 Supercopa de España.	Capacity: 62,345	

== Matches ==
- Times listed are SAST (UTC+3).

=== Bracket ===
Semi-finals
7 January 2026 – Jeddah
Barcelona	5
Athletic Bilbao	0
8 January 2026 – Jeddah
Atlético Madrid	1
Real Madrid	2

Final
11 January 2026 – Jeddah
Barcelona	3
Real Madrid	2

=== Semi-finals ===
7 January 2026
22:00

Barcelona	5–0	Athletic Bilbao
Torres 22'; López 30'; Bardghji 34'; Raphinha 38', 52'	Report

King Abdullah Sports City Stadium, Jeddah
Attendance: 50,141
Referee: Isidro Díaz de Mera Escuderos (Castilla–La Mancha)

8 January 2026
22:00

Atlético Madrid	1–2	Real Madrid
Sørloth 58'	Report	Valverde 2'; Rodrygo 55'

King Abdullah Sports City Stadium, Jeddah
Attendance: 55,651
Referee: Mateo Busquets Ferrer (Balearic Islands)

=== Final ===
11 January 2026
22:00

Barcelona	3–2	Real Madrid
Raphinha 36', 73'; Lewandowski 45+4'	Report	Vinícius 45+2'; G. García 45+6'

King Abdullah Sports City, Jeddah
Attendance: 60,326
Referee: José Luis Munuera Montero (Andalusia)

== See also ==
- 2025–26 La Liga
- 2025–26 Copa del Rey
