= 2024–25 FC Barcelona season =

126th season of FC Barcelona

Barcelona
2024–25 season
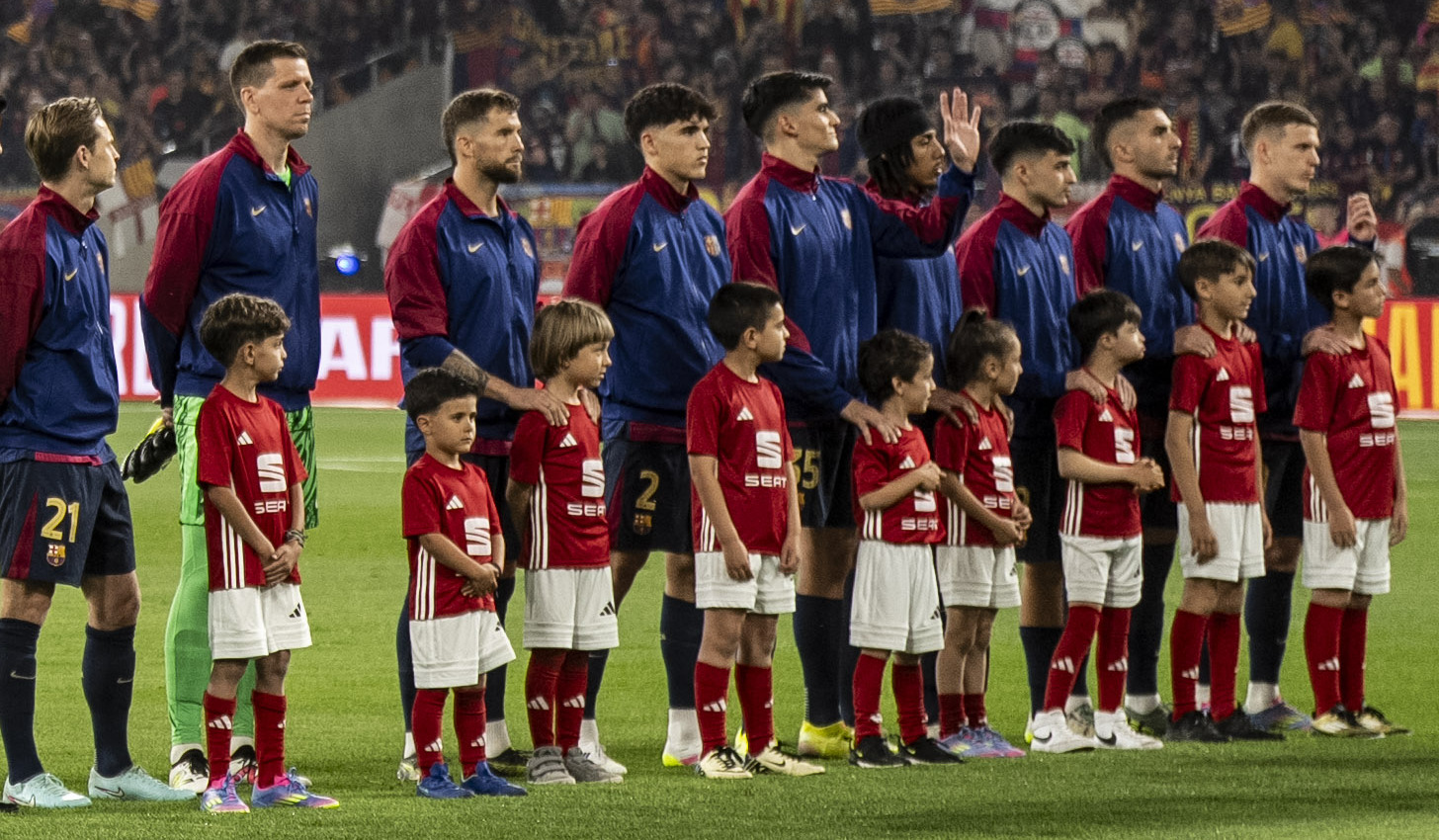
- Barcelona players lining up during the 2025 Copa del Rey final
- President: Joan Laporta
- Head coach: Hansi Flick
- Stadium: Estadi Olímpic Lluís Companys
- La Liga: 1st
- Copa del Rey: Winners
- Supercopa de España: Winners
- UEFA Champions League: Semi-finals
- Top goalscorer: League: Robert Lewandowski (27); All: Robert Lewandowski (42)
- Highest home attendance: 50,319 vs Real Madrid (11 May 2025)
- Lowest home attendance: 39,523 vs Leganés (15 December 2024)
- Average home league attendance: 45,953
- Biggest win: Home: Barcelona 7–0 Valladolid; Away: Valencia 0–5 Barcelona
- Biggest defeat: Home: Barcelona 1–2 Las Palmas; Barcelona 0–1 Leganés; Barcelona 1–2 Atlético Madrid; Away: Osasuna 4–2 Barcelona; Borussia Dortmund 3–1 Barcelona
Home colours	Away colours	Third colours

The 2024–25 Futbol Club Barcelona season was the club's 126th season in existence and their 94th consecutive season in the top flight. In addition to the domestic league, Barcelona participated in this season's editions of the Copa del Rey, the Supercopa de España and the UEFA Champions League (entering for the 21st consecutive season). The season covered the period from 1 July 2024 until 30 June 2025.

Barcelona played their official home matches at the Estadi Olímpic Lluís Companys throughout the season while awaiting the completion of renovations at Camp Nou, which was not yet available at full seating capacity. The club had initially planned to return to Camp Nou on 15 December 2024 but was unable to do so because UEFA regulations prohibited teams from changing venues midway through the Champions League league phase.

Barcelona won a domestic treble, defeating rivals Real Madrid in two finals and twice in the league to edge them out in the title race. Although Barcelona fell short in the Champions League, losing to Inter Milan in the semi-finals after extra time, the 2024–25 campaign was the club’s most successful season since 2014–15.

This was Barcelona’s first season since 2009–10 without veteran full-back Sergi Roberto, who left the club when his contract expired.

== Kits ==
- Supplier: Nike
- Sponsors: Spotify (front) (Note: As part of the sponsorship deal, the Spotify logo is replaced by that of various musical artists for promotion in select matches. For the Clásico on 26 October, the logo is set to be that of Coldplay as promotion for their album Moon Music. The club is also connected to Coldplay through the use of song "Viva la Vida" as the club's celebratory anthem since 2008–09. American rapper Travis Scott was announced as the team's sponsor for 11 May's Clasico and also performed an exclusive concert to promote the match.) / AMBILIGHT TV (left sleeve) / UNHCR – The UN Refugee Agency (back)

Home (Note: In honour of the club's 125th anniversary, the design of the home kit reflects that of the centenary shirt. It is half-and-half blaugrana, rather than striped, as an homage to the first shirts worn by the club in 1899.)
Home (125th Anniversary) (Note: For the first time since 1910, the alternative shorts would be white, similar to the original kit.)
Away (Note: In contrast to the flashback of the home kit, the away kit was designed as "a look into the kits of the future". It is primarily matte black – a colour that has been popular among fans in previous kits – and has a darkened badge rendered in TPU to be transparent and reflective. The details are outlined in maroon and blue, carrying over the half-and-half of the home kit.)
Third (Note: The third kit is a tribute to the club's women's team and their success. The green colour symbolises "the hope and rebirth of the team as well as the dawning of a brand new and vibrant era." The shirt has a subtle pattern of a stylised Venus symbol, used to represent the female gender. Several of the 2024–25 third kits designed by Nike, including Barcelona's, pay tribute to the role of women's football in the modern game by featuring a doubled and rotated swoosh that points upwards to signify "together we rise".)
Fourth (Note: The fourth kit is the same as the 2022–23 season; it features the Catalan senyera flag on the chest horizontally to pay tribute to the club's Catalan identity, except this time, it features new Spotify logo.)
Goalkeeper 1
Goalkeeper 2
Goalkeeper 3

Training 1

Training 2

== Season overview ==
=== Pre-season ===
On 19 March, Barcelona announced they would be touring the United States to participate in the pre-season Soccer Champions Tour, with three friendly matches against Manchester City in Orlando on 30 July, Real Madrid in New Jersey on 3 August and Milan in Baltimore on 6 August.

On 26 June, Barcelona announced that the pre-season would start with the players' medical examinations on 10 July.

On 29 June, Sergiño Dest left permanently for PSV Eindhoven on a free transfer, ending his four years at the club. Two days later, young striker Marc Guiu departed for Chelsea for €6 million.

On 24 July, Pau Víctor joined Barcelona permanently, signing a contract until 2029. The following day, Barcelona opened preseason behind closed doors with a 1–0 win over Catalan side Olot.

On 30 July, Barcelona drew 2–2 with Manchester City in Orlando before winning 1–4 on penalties. Pau Víctor and Pablo Torre scored the goals for Barça.

=== August ===
On 3 August, Barcelona defeated Real Madrid 2–1 in New Jersey. Pau Víctor scored a brace to secure the El Clásico victory. Two days later, Oriol Romeu was loaned out to Girona for the rest of the season.

On 6 August, Barcelona drew 2–2 with AC Milan in Baltimore before losing 3–4 on penalties. Robert Lewandowski scored both goals for Barça. Three days later, Barcelona announced reaching an agreement to sign Dani Olmo from RB Leipzig for a reported fee of €60 million on six-year contract, therefore the Spaniard completed a return move to his youth career club.

On 12 August, Barcelona lost 0–3 against Monaco in the Joan Gamper Trophy, failing to find the back of the net in their pre-season finale. The next day, Julián Araujo was sold to Bournemouth for €10 million.

On 17 August, Barcelona started the new league season on the right foot, with a 1–2 away win over Valencia thanks to a brace from Robert Lewandowski. Marc Bernal and Gerard Martín, and new signing Pau Víctor made their debuts.

On 23 August, Ilkay Gündoğan left on a free transfer, returning to Manchester City after just one season at Barcelona. The next day, the team defeated Athletic Bilbao 2–1 in their first home match of the season, with Lewandowski and Yamal scoring a goal each.

On 25 August, Mikayil Faye completed a permanent move to Rennes for €10.3 million. The next day, Vitor Roque and Clément Lenglet were loaned to Real Betis and Atlético Madrid respectively.

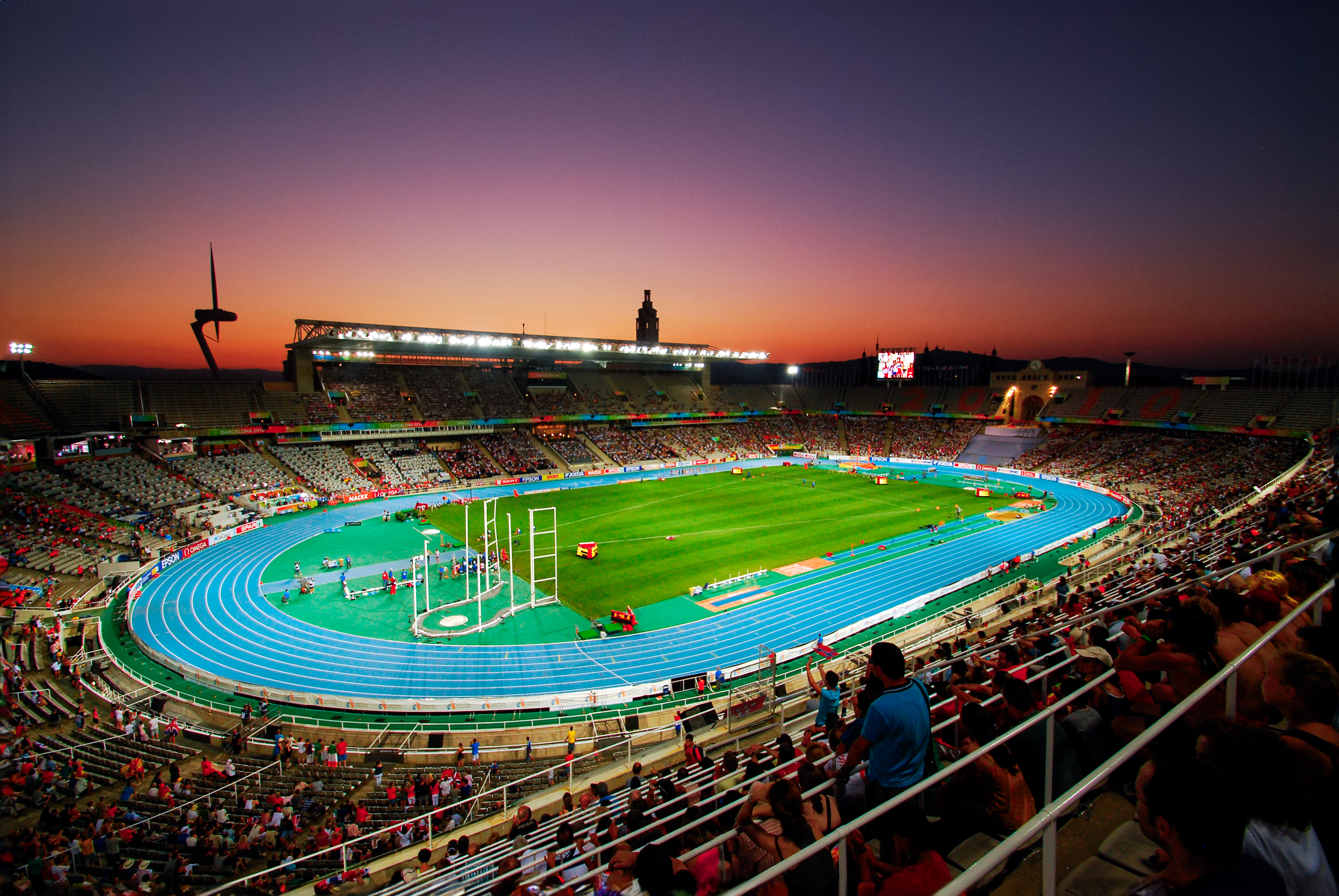
Estadi Olímpic Lluís Companys was used as the home ground for the second season in a row

On 27 August, Barça got a 1–2 comeback win away against Rayo Vallecano and climbed to first place in the league table. New signing Dani Olmo made his debut and scored the winning goal of the match, with the other goal coming from Pedri. The following day, Álex Valle was loaned to Celtic for the rest of the season.

Barcelona ended the month with a dominant 7–0 win against Real Valladolid on 31 August, making it four wins in four matches since the start of the season. Raphinha scored a hat-trick, with Lewandowski, Koundé, Olmo and Torres scoring a goal each, while Yamal contributed with two assists to continue his impressive start to the season. Sergi Domínguez also made his debut.

=== September ===
On 15 September, Barcelona defeated Girona 1–4, with Yamal scoring a brace and Olmo and Pedri scoring a goal each. Lewandowski made his 100th appearance with the club.

Barcelona started the Champions League campaign with a 2–1 defeat at the hands of Monaco, after Eric García got sent off early on in the first half. Yamal scored the only goal for the team and his first in the Champions League and became the second youngest goalscorer of all time in the competition, only behind his teammate Ansu Fati who holds the record.

The team went back to winning ways after they defeated Villarreal 1–5 to make it six wins in as many matches in the league. Lewandowski and Raphinha got a brace each and Pablo Torre scored once.

Barcelona maintained their winning streak in the league when they beat Getafe 1–0 on 25 September, with the goal coming from Lewandowski who scored his 49th La Liga goal and became the league's all-time leading Polish goalscorer, overtaking the 48 goals scored by Jan Urban. Lewandowski's goal also had special significance for the club, since with this goal Barcelona became the first team in La Liga history to score 6,500 goals.

Barcelona's perfect start of seven straight wins in La Liga ended after they suffered their first league defeat of the season, losing 4–2 away to Osasuna. The goals for the team came from Yamal and Pau Víctor, who scored his first goal for the club.

=== October ===
Barcelona started the new month with a 5–0 win against Young Boys in a match where Lewandowski scored a brace, Raphinha scored once, Iñigo Martínez got his first goal for the club and the last goal of the match was an own goal scored by Young Boys' defender Mohamed Ali Camara. Young defender Andrés Cuenca also made his debut.

On 2 October, Barcelona signed Wojciech Szczęsny to a contract until the end of the season after Marc-André ter Stegen suffered a severe patella tendon rupture. Four days later, Barcelona defeated Deportivo Alavés 0–3 in their last match before the international break, with Lewandowski scoring his first hat-trick of the season.

After their return from the international break, the team continued their winning form by defeating Sevilla 5–1 on 20 October. Lewandowski and Pablo Torre both scored braces, with Pedri scoring once.

On 23 October, Barcelona defeated Bayern Munich 4–1 in a statement win and ended the six-match winless streak against the Germans. Raphinha marked his 100th match with the team with a hat-trick, with the other goal coming from Lewandowski.

In the last match of the month, Barcelona demolished Real Madrid 0–4 away in the first El Clásico of the season on 26 October. Lewandowski scored a brace, while Yamal and Raphinha scored a goal each; with his goal Yamal became the youngest player to ever score in El Clásico. With this win Barcelona ended Real Madrid's 42-game unbeaten La Liga run and defended their record for the most consecutive league games without a loss in La Liga history, which stands at 43 matches, and went six points clear at the top of the league table.

=== November ===
Barcelona started November with a 3–1 win over Espanyol in the Barcelona derby thanks to a brace from Olmo and a goal from Raphinha. Later in the week, Barcelona won their third champions league match in a row defeating Red Star Belgrade in Belgrade with the score of 2–5 with Lewandowski scoring a brace and Raphinha, Iñigo Martínez and Fermín scoring each a goal. However, the Catalans' title hopes took a dent after a 1–0 away loss to Real Sociedad and a 2–2 away draw to Celta Vigo. Barcelona then beat Brest 3–0 in the champions league to move into third place in the league phase table. November then ended with Barcelona losing 1–2 at home to Las Palmas leaving them 2 points clear of 2nd-placed Atlético Madrid after 15 games.

=== December ===
Barcelona began December by beating Mallorca 1–5 away from home in the league. Their next game was a 2–2 away draw to Real Betis allowing Real Madrid to reduce their lead to two points. Barcelona would bounce back by beating Borussia Dortmund 2–3 away in the Champions League to move 2nd in the league phase table, three points behind leaders Liverpool. Barcelona's league title hopes were dented after a 0–1 home defeat to Leganés, but remained top of the league after Real Madrid drew their next game. However, Barcelona then suffered a late 1–2 home defeat to Atlético Madrid, meaning they would end 2024 second in the league.

=== January ===
Barcelona began the new year by defeating Barbastro 0–4 in the Copa del Rey round of 32, with Szczęsny and Toni Fernández making their debuts for the club. Four days later, they beat Athletic Bilbao 0–2 in the Supercopa de España semi-finals to set up a final with Real Madrid.

In the final Barcelona beat Real Madrid 2–5 to win the Supercopa de España. Albeit a man down following the dismissal of goalkeeper Wojciech Szczęsny, Barcelona came back from a goal down with four goals in a dominant first half at the King Abdullah Sports City Stadium in Jeddah, clinching the trophy for a record 15th time from the grasp of their fierce rivals. The win also gave Hansi Flick his first trophy in charge of the club.

In the Copa del Rey round of 16, Barcelona beat Real Betis 5–1 at home to advance to the quarter-finals. They then played their first league game of 2025 which was a 1–1 away draw with Getafe. This crushed Barca's title hopes even more as they were now 5 points behind Atlético Madrid.

In the Champions League Barcelona faced Benfica at the Estádio da Luz. Benfica took the lead in the 2nd minute through a Vangelis Pavlidis goal. Robert Lewandowski equalised from the penalty spot in the 13th minute before Pavlidids scored twice to put Benfica 3–1 up. Raphinha scored in the 64th minute to make it 3–2, but Araújo scored an own goal to make it 4–2 to Benfica. Lewandowski scored a pen in the 78th minute to give Barcelona hope before Eric Garcia scored in the 86th minute to make it 4–4. Raphinha then scored in the 96th minute to win the game 4–5 for Barcelona. The win confirmed Barcelona would finish in the top 8 of the league phase, earning automatic advancement to the Champions League round of 16.

Barcelona won a La Liga match for the first time in four attempts after beating Valencia 7–1 at home, to keep their title hopes alive despite being 7 points behind leaders Real Madrid.

Barcelona's final Champions League league phase match finished as a 2–2 draw against Atalanta on 29 January, which prevented the former from pipping Liverpool to top spot in the league phase table; the club finished 2nd, two points off top spot. The next day, midfielder Unai Hernández was transferred to Al-Ittihad for €4.5 million.

=== February ===
On 1 February, with his Celtic loan cut short, Álex Valle moved on a second loan to Como for the rest of the season. The next day, Barcelona defeated Alavés 1–0, and with Real Madrid losing 1–0 to Espanyol, Barcelona reduced the gap between them and Real to 4 points.

Barcelona then won their Copa Del Rey quarter final against Valencia 0–5 to set up a semi-final with Atlético Madrid.

Barcelona won 1–4 against Sevilla in the league, and with Real Madrid dropping points again, closed the gap to Real down to 2 points. They then moved to the top of the league after beating Rayo Valleanco 1–0 and Real and Atlético both drew 1–1. After beating Las Palmas 0–2, they remained top of the league, level with Real Madrid after 25 matches.

On 25 February, Barcelona faced Atlético Madrid in the Copa Del Rey semi-finals, with the first leg at home. Julian Alvarez and Antoine Griezmann scored to put Atlético 0–2 up in 6 minutes, before Pedri, Cubarsí, Martínez and Lewandowski then scored goals to make it 4–2 to Barcelona. However, Atlético scored in the 84th and 93rd minutes as the match ended 4–4, with the second leg to be played away. Three days later, Vitor Roque's loan at Betis was cut short and he completed a permanent move to Palmeiras for €25.5 million.

=== March ===
Barcelona began March by beating Real Sociedad 4–0, with Gerard Martín and Marc Casadó scoring their first goals for the club, and with Real Madrid losing, they extended their lead at the top of the table to 3 points.

Barcelona faced Benfica in the Champions League round of 16 with the first leg away from home. Raphinha scored the game's only goal to give Barcelona a 0–1 aggregate lead to take to the second leg at home.

On 8 March 2025, Barcelona's scheduled match against Osasuna was postponed roughly 20 minutes prior to kick-off, following the announcement of first-team doctor Carles Miñarro Garcia's death.

Barcelona then won the second leg against Benfica 3–1 at home to advance to the Champions League quarter-finals 4–1 on aggerate. They then came from behind to beat Atlético Madrid 2–4 away, putting them level on points with Real Madrid with a game in hand.

Barcelona then won the rearranged fixture against Osasuna 3–0 to move three points clear of the top of the table. they then ended the month by beating Girona 4–1 at home to keep their 3-point lead over Real Madrid.

=== April ===
April began for Barcelona with them beating Atlético Madrid 0–1 away in the Copa Del Rey semi final through a Ferran Torres goal to set up a final with Real Madrid.

Barcelona then drew 1–1 with Real Betis but extended their lead to 4 points after Real Madrid lost their next game.

Barcelona faced Borussia Dortmund in the Champions League quarter-finals and won the first leg 4–0 at home. Barcelona then beat Leganés 0–1 away to move closer to the title.

Barcelona then lost the second leg of their champions league quarter-finals 3–1 to Dortmund but advanced to the semi-finals 3–5 on aggregate which marked the first time Barcelona had reached the semi-finals since the 2018–19 edition.

Barcelona then came from behind to beat Celta Vigo in La Liga 4–3 to remain 4 points clear after Real Madrid won later that week. A 1–0 win over Mallorca from a Dani Olmo goal put Barcelona one step closer to the title.

In the Copa Del Rey final against Real Madrid, Barcelona won 3–2 after extra time. Pedri opened the scoring for Barcelona in the 23rd minute, but Kylian Mbappé equalised in the 70th minute to make it 1–1. Aurélien Tchouaméni scored in the 77th minute to make it 1–2 to Real Madrid, but Ferran Torres scored in the 84th minute to send the match to extra time. Jules Koundé then scored in the 116th minute to win the game for Barcelona giving the Catalan club their 32nd Copa Del Rey title. The match wasn't without controversy, as Antonio Rüdiger was seen throwing an ice cube at the referee getting a red card, Lucas Vázquez entered the pitch to confront the referee aggressively and got sent off, and Jude Bellingham argued with the ref aggressively getting shown a red card. The Copa Del Rey marked Hansi Flick's second trophy as Barcelona manager.

Barcelona ended the month of April by facing Inter Milan in the Champions League semi-finals. Marcus Thuram scored in the first minute to give Inter the lead, with Denzel Dumfries scoring a second in the 21st minute. Lamine Yamal scored in the 24th minute to bring Barcelona back in the game. Ferran Torres equalised in the 38th minute. Dumfries then made it 2–3 to Inter Milan in the 64th minute, before Yann Sommer scored an own goal trying to save a Raphinha shot making the score 3–3, which would be the final score.

=== May ===
Barcelona began May by coming from behind to beat Valladolid 1–2, which put them two wins away from the La Liga title. Dani Rodríguez made his debut in the match, starting before being forced off with a shoulder injury.

Barcelona then travelled to the San Siro to face Inter Milan in the second leg of their Champions League semi-final. Lautaro Martínez scored in the 21st minute to give Inter the lead. Inter were then awarded a penalty in the 45th minute when Pau Cubarsí tackled Martínez in the box, with Hakan Çalhanoğlu converting the penalty. The penalty left Hansi Flick furious as Barcelona went into half time 5–3 down on aggregate. Barcelona would fight back with goals from Eric García and Dani Olmo to level the score as they dominated the second half. In the 87th minute, Raphinha had a chance but it was saved by Yann Sommer; however, Raphinha converted the rebound to give Barcelona the lead in the tie for the first time and put them 9 minutes away from a first Champions League final since 2015. However, in the 6th minute of stoppage time, Francesco Acerbi scored from a cross from Denzel Dumfries to level the tie despite Barcelona's complaints about a foul in the build up to the goal. The tie finished 6–6 on aggregate, requiring the game to go to extra time. In the 9th minute of extra time, Davide Frattesi got a cross from Marcus Thuram and fired it into the net to make it 4–3 to Inter and 7–6 on aggregate. Despite two late chances in the seconf half of extra time, Inter held on to win 4–3 and advance to the final 7–6 on aggerate. Hansi Flick was furious after the defeat, saying that every 50/50 had gone Inter's way. The semi-final was regarded by pundits and fans as one of the greatest Champions League ties in the history of the competition.

Barcelona then faced Real Madrid at home, knowing a win or draw would put them on the brink of the title. Kylian Mbappé scored a penalty in the 5th minute to give Real Madrid the lead and then added a second goal in the 14th minute. Eric García scored in the 19th minute to reduce the deficit. Lamine Yamal then scored in the 32nd minute to equalise before a Raphinha brace put Barcelona 4–2 up at half time. Mbappé would score a third for Real Madrid in the 70th minute to give them hope, but Barcelona held on to win 4–3 and move 7 points clear of Real Madrid in the title race, meaning a victory against Espanyol would give the Catalan club the league title. This also marked the first time Barcelona won four Clásicos in a season since the 1982–83 campaign.

Barcelona then faced Espanyol away needing a win to win the title. The game was paused in the 15th minute after a car drove into fans outside the stadium, but resumed after the issue was sorted. The first half finished 0–0, but in the 53rd minute Lamine Yamal scored a brilliant goal to put Barcelona 0–1 up. Fermin López then scored in stoppage time to make it 0–2, confirming the win for Barcelona, which meant the Catalan's won their 28th La Liga title and completed the domestic treble with Hansi Flick winning his third trophy in charge of the club.

Barcelona then suffered a 2–3 home defeat to Villarreal, despite Yamal and López scoring for the 2nd game in a row. The match marked Barcelona's first league defeat since December 2024, and ended a 17-match unbeaten run for the Catalans. Barcelona then won their final game of the season, beating Athletic Bilbao 0–3 with a brace from Lewandowski and a late goal from Olmo to finish with 88 points.

Barcelona ended their season winning the domestic treble, with their only disappointment being the defeat to Inter Milan in the Champions League semi-finals. Despite the failure to end their ten-year Champions League drought, this season was arguably most successful for Barcelona since the 2014–15 campaign. Due to this, Barcelona extended Hansi Flick's contract until 2027, and gave players like Lamine Yamal and Raphinha new long-term contracts.

== Management team ==
Position	Name
Head coach	(Germany) Hansi Flick
Assistant coaches	(Germany) Marcus Sorg, (Croatia) Toni Tapalović, (Germany) Heiko Westermann, (Spain) Thiago Alcântara (until 15 August), (Spain) Arnau Blanco (from 15 August)
Goalkeeping coach	(Spain) José Ramón de la Fuente
Fitness coaches	(Spain) Julio Tous, (Spain) Pepe Conde, (Spain) Rafa Maldonado, (Spain) Germán Fernández, (Spain) Andrés Martín, (Spain) Milos Mallol
Rehab coaches	(Spain) Juan Carlos Pérez, (Spain) Yon Álvarez
Analysts	(Germany) Stephan Nopp, (Germany) Michael Hasemann, (Spain) Eloy Jordan, (Spain) Francesc Martí, (Spain) Xavier Pavo, (Spain) Jordi Pons, (Spain) Guillem Escriu

- Last updated: 15 August 2024
- Source: FC Barcelona Annual Report 2024/25

== Players ==
=== First team ===
N	Pos.	Nat.	Name	Age	EU	Since	App	Goals	Ends	Transfer fee	Notes
Goalkeepers
1	GK	(Germany)	Marc-André ter Stegen (captain)	33	EU	2014	422	0	2028	€12M	
13	GK	(Spain)	Iñaki Peña	26	EU	2021	45	0	2026	Youth system	From La Masia
25	GK	(Poland)	Wojciech Szczęsny	35	EU	2024	30	0	2025	Free	Back from Retirement
Defenders
2	DF	(Spain)	Pau Cubarsí	18	EU	2024	81	1	2029	Youth system	From La Masia
3	DF	(Spain)	Alejandro Balde	21	EU	2022	126	3	2028	Youth system	From La Masia
4	DF	(Uruguay)	Ronald Araújo (vice captain)	26	EU	2019	175	10	2031	€1.7M	
5	DF	(Spain)	Iñigo Martínez	34	EU	2023	71	3	2026	Free	
15	DF	(Denmark)	Andreas Christensen	29	EU	2022	80	4	2026	Free	
23	DF	(France)	Jules Koundé	26	EU	2022	141	7	2027	€50M	
24	DF	(Spain)	Eric García	24	EU	2021	115	6	2026	Free	From La Masia
Midfielders
6	MF	(Spain)	Gavi	20	EU	2021	153	10	2030	Youth system	From La Masia
8	MF	(Spain)	Pedri (5th captain)	22	EU	2020	202	26	2030	€5M	
14	MF	(Spain)	Pablo Torre	22	EU	2022	27	5	2026	€5M	
16	MF	(Spain)	Fermín López	22	EU	2023	88	19	2029	Youth system	From La Masia
17	MF	(Spain)	Marc Casadó	21	EU	2022	41	1	2028	Youth system	From La Masia
20	MF	(Spain)	Dani Olmo	27	EU	2024	39	12	2030	€55M	From La Masia
21	MF	(Netherlands)	Frenkie de Jong (3rd captain)	28	EU	2019	259	19	2026	€75M	
Forwards
7	FW	(Spain)	Ferran Torres	25	EU	2021 (Winter)	158	43	2027	€55M	
9	FW	(Poland)	Robert Lewandowski	36	EU	2022	147	101	2026	€45M	
10	FW	(Spain)	Ansu Fati	22	EU	2019	123	29	2027	Youth system	From La Masia
11	FW	(Brazil)	Raphinha (4th captain)	28	EU	2022	144	54	2027	€58M	
18	FW	(Spain)	Pau Víctor	23	EU	2023	29	2	2029	€2.7M	
19	FW	(Spain)	Lamine Yamal	17	EU	2023	106	25	2031	Youth system	From La Masia

- Last updated: 27 May 2025
- Source: FC Barcelona, Official numbers 2024–25, La Liga and UEFA
- Ordered by squad number.

=== Reserve team ===
N	Pos.	Nat.	Name	Age	EU	Since	App	Goals	Ends	Transfer fee	Notes
26	GK	(Spain)	Ander Astralaga	21	EU	2022	0	0	2026	Youth system	
28	MF	(Spain)	Marc Bernal	17	EU	2023	3	0	2026	Youth system	
29	MF	(Spain)	Aleix Garrido	21	EU	2022	0	0	2025	Youth system	
30	MF	(Spain)	Pau Prim	19	EU	2023	0	0	2026	Youth system	
31	GK	(United States)	Diego Kochen	19	Non-EU	2024	0	0	2026	Youth system	
32	DF	(Spain)	Héctor Fort	18	EU	2023	30	0	2026	Youth system	
34/45	MF	(Germany)	Noah Darvich	18	EU	2024	0	0	2026	€2.5M	
35	DF	(Spain)	Gerard Martín	23	EU	2023	42	1	2028	Transfer	
36	DF	(Spain)	Sergi Domínguez	20	EU	2023	6	0	2027	Youth system	
37	MF	(Spain)	Quim Junyent	18	EU	2024	0	0	2029	Youth system	
38	DF	(Spain)	Alexis Olmedo	19	EU	2024	0	0	2029	Youth system	
39	DF	(Spain)	Andrés Cuenca	17	EU	2024	1	0	2026	Youth system	
40	GK	(Hungary)	Áron Yaakobishvili	19	EU	2024	0	0	2026	Youth system	
41	MF	(Spain)	Guille Fernández	16	EU	2024	0	0	2027	Youth system	
42	FW	(Spain)	Toni Fernández	16	EU	2024	1	0	2027	Youth system	
43	DF	(Spain)	Álvaro Cortés	20	EU	2023	0	0	2027	Youth system	
44	DF	(Spain)	Landry Farré	18	EU	2024	0	0	2026	Youth system	
46	MF	(Spain)	Dani Rodríguez	19	EU	2024	1	0	2027	Youth system	

- Last updated: 25 May 2025
- Source: FC Barcelona, La Liga and UEFA
- Ordered by squad number.

=== Contract renewals ===
No.	Pos.	Nat.	Name	Date	Until	Source
16	MF	(Spain)	Fermín López	31 October 2024	30 June 2029	
4	DF	(Uruguay)	Ronald Araújo	23 January 2025	30 June 2031	
35	DF	(Spain)	Gerard Martín	24 January 2025	30 June 2028	
8	MF	(Spain)	Pedri	29 January 2025	30 June 2030	
6	MF	(Spain)	Gavi	31 January 2025	30 June 2030	
2	DF	(Spain)	Pau Cubarsí	13 February 2025	30 June 2029	
5	DF	(Spain)	Iñigo Martínez	13 March 2025	30 June 2026	
Manager		(Germany)	Hansi Flick	21 May 2025	30 June 2027	
11	FW	(Brazil)	Raphinha	22 May 2025	30 June 2028	
19	FW	(Spain)	Lamine Yamal	27 May 2025	30 June 2031	

== Transfers ==
=== In ===
No.	Pos.	Player	Transfer from	Fee	Date	Source
Summer
24	DF	(Spain) Eric García	(Spain) Girona	Loan return	1 July 2024	
12	DF	(France) Clément Lenglet	(England) Aston Villa	Loan return	1 July 2024	
—	DF	(Mexico) Julián Araujo	(Spain) Las Palmas	Loan return	1 July 2024	
14	MF	(Spain) Pablo Torre	(Spain) Girona	Loan return	1 July 2024	
10	FW	(Spain) Ansu Fati	(England) Brighton & Hove Albion	Loan return	1 July 2024	
18	FW	(Spain) Pau Víctor	(Spain) Girona	€2.7 million	24 July 2024	
20	MF	(Spain) Dani Olmo	(Germany) RB Leipzig	€55 million	9 August 2024	
25	GK	(Poland) Wojciech Szczęsny	Retired (Note: Most recently played for Juventus)	Free	2 October 2024	
Total				€57.7 million		

=== Out ===
No.	Pos.	Player	Transfer to	Fee	Date	Source
—	DF	(United States) Sergiño Dest	(Netherlands) PSV Eindhoven	Free	29 June 2024	
17	DF	(Spain) Marcos Alonso	(Spain) Celta Vigo	End of contract	1 July 2024	
20	MF	(Spain) Sergi Roberto	(Italy) Como	End of contract	1 July 2024	
2	DF	(Portugal) João Cancelo	(England) Manchester City	Loan return	1 July 2024	
14	FW	(Portugal) João Félix	(Spain) Atlético Madrid	Loan return	1 July 2024	
38	FW	(Spain) Marc Guiu	(England) Chelsea	€6 million	1 July 2024	
—	DF	(Mexico) Julián Araujo	(England) Bournemouth	€10 million	13 August 2024	
22	MF	(Germany) İlkay Gündoğan	(England) Manchester City	Free	23 August 2024	
33	DF	(Senegal) Mikayil Faye	(France) Rennes	€10.3 million	25 August 2024	
—	MF	(Spain) Unai Hernández	(Saudi Arabia) Al-Ittihad	€4.5 million	30 January 2025	
—	FW	(Brazil) Vitor Roque	(Brazil) Palmeiras	€25.5 million	28 February 2025	
Total				€56.3 million		

=== Loans in ===
No.	Pos.	Player	Loaned from	Fee	Date	On loan until	Source
Total				€0			

=== Loans out ===
No.	Pos.	Player	Loaned to	Fee	Date	On loan until	Source
—	MF	(Spain) Oriol Romeu	(Spain) Girona	None	5 August 2024	End of season	
—	FW	(Brazil) Vitor Roque	(Spain) Real Betis	None	26 August 2024	28 February 2025	
—	DF	(France) Clément Lenglet	(Spain) Atlético Madrid	None	26 August 2024	End of season	
—	DF	(Spain) Álex Valle	(Scotland) Celtic	None	28 August 2024	31 January 2025	
—	DF	(Spain) Álex Valle	(Italy) Como	None	1 February 2025	End of season	
Total				€0			

== Pre-season and friendlies ==
Win Draw Loss Fixtures

25 July 2024 Friendly	Barcelona	1–0	Olot	Sant Joan Despí, Spain
18:00 CEST (UTC+2)	Torre 47'	Report		Stadium: Ciutat Esportiva Joan Gamper – Field 7 Attendance: 0
Note: The match was played behind closed doors.

30 July 2024 Soccer Champions Tour	Barcelona	2–2 (4–1 p)	Manchester City	Orlando, United States
20:20 EDT (UTC−4)	Víctor 24'; Torre 45+2'; Casadó (yellow card) 55'	Report	O'Reilly 39', (yellow card) 56'; Grealish 60'; Susoho (yellow card) 70'	Stadium: Camping World Stadium; Attendance: 63,237; Referee: Tim Ford (United States)
	Penalties
	Lewandowski (penalty scored); Darvich (penalty scored); Balde (penalty scored); Fernández (penalty scored)		(penalty missed) Phillips; (penalty missed) Wright; (penalty scored) Fatah

3 August 2024 Soccer Champions Tour	Real Madrid	1–2	Barcelona	New Jersey, United States
19:00 EDT (UTC−4)	Martín (yellow card) 76'; Paz 82'; Ramón (yellow card) 90'	Report	Víctor 42', 54'; Bernal (yellow card) 67'; Fort (yellow card) 90+2'	Stadium: MetLife Stadium; Attendance: 82,154; Referee: Armando Villarreal (United States)
Note: The match was delayed in the 12th minute due to lightning, and resumed at 20:30 EDT.

6 August 2024 Soccer Champions Tour	Barcelona	2–2 (3–4 p)	Milan	Baltimore, United States
19:30 EDT (UTC−4)	Lewandowski 22', 58'; Martín (yellow card) 37'; Casadó (yellow card) 69'; Junyent (yellow card) 84'; G. Fernández (yellow card) 86'	Report	Jović 10'; Pulisic 15'; Saelemaekers (yellow card) 46'; Bennacer (yellow card) 89'	Stadium: M&T Bank Stadium; Attendance: 51,337; Referee: Victor Rivas (United States)
	Penalties
	Koundé (penalty missed); Junyent (penalty missed); Bernal (penalty scored); Fernández (penalty scored); Vitor Roque (penalty scored); Faye (penalty missed)		(penalty missed) Bennacer; (penalty scored) Calabria; (penalty scored) Okafor; (penalty missed) Kalulu; (penalty scored) Adli; (penalty scored) Zeroli

12 August 2024 Joan Gamper Trophy	Barcelona	0–3	Monaco	Barcelona, Spain
20:00 CEST (UTC+2)		Report	Camara 50'; Embolo 57'; Mawissa 86'; Salisu (yellow card) 90+4'	Stadium: Estadi Olímpic Lluís Companys; Attendance: 41,416; Referee: Victor García Verdura (Spain)

== Competitions ==
=== Overall record ===
Competition	First match	Last match	Starting round	Final position	Record							
Competition	First match	Last match	Starting round	Final position	Pld	W	D	L	GF	GA	GD	Win %
La Liga	17 August 2024	25 May 2025	Matchday 1	Winners	38	28	4	6	102	39	+63	73.68
Copa del Rey	4 January 2025	26 April 2025	Round of 32	Winners	6	5	1	0	22	7	+15	83.33
Supercopa de España	8 January 2025	12 January 2025	Semi-finals	Winners	2	2	0	0	7	2	+5	100.00
UEFA Champions League	19 September 2024	6 May 2025	League phase	Semi-finals	14	9	2	3	43	24	+19	64.29
Total					60	44	7	9	174	72	+102	73.33

Source: Soccerway

Competition won

=== La Liga ===
==== League table ====
Pos	Team	Pld	W	D	L	GF	GA	GD	Pts	Qualification or relegation
1	Barcelona (C)	38	28	4	6	102	39	+63	88	Qualification for the Champions League league stage (Note: La Liga gained an additional Champions League place as a result of Spain gaining one of the two European Performance Spots (EPS) awarded to the two associations with the highest UEFA coefficient points in 2024–25.)
2	Real Madrid	38	26	6	6	78	38	+40	84	Qualification for the Champions League league stage
3	Atlético Madrid	38	22	10	6	68	30	+38	76	Qualification for the Champions League league stage
4	Athletic Bilbao	38	19	13	6	54	29	+25	70 (Note: Athletic Bilbao finished ahead of Villarreal on head-to-head points: Athletic Bilbao 2–0 Villarreal, Villarreal 0–0 Athletic Bilbao.)	Qualification for the Champions League league stage
5	Villarreal	38	20	10	8	71	51	+20	70	Qualification for the Champions League league stage

Source: LaLiga EA Sports
Rules for classification: 1) Points; 2) Head-to-head points; 3) Head-to-head goal difference; 4) Goal difference; 5) Goals scored; 6) Fair-play points
(Note: Head-to-head record is used only after all the matches between the teams in question have been played)
(C) Champions

==== Results summary ====
Overall								Home						Away					
Pld	W	D	L	GF	GA	GD	Pts	W	D	L	GF	GA	GD	W	D	L	GF	GA	GD
38	28	4	6	102	39	+63	88	14	1	4	52	20	+32	14	3	2	50	19	+31

Source: La Liga

==== Results by round ====
Round	1	2	3	4	5	6	7	8	9	10	11	12	13	14	15	19^{1}	16	17	18	20	21	22	23	24	25	26	28	27^{2}	29	30	31	32	33	34	35	36	37	38
Ground	A	H	A	H	A	A	H	A	A	H	A	H	A	A	H	A	A	H	H	A	H	H	A	H	A	H	A	H	H	H	A	H	H	A	H	A	H	A
Result	W	W	W	W	W	W	W	L	W	W	W	W	L	D	L	W	D	L	L	D	W	W	W	W	W	W	W	W	W	D	W	W	W	W	W	W	L	W
Position	2	2	1	1	1	1	1	1	1	1	1	1	1	1	1	1	1	1	3	3	3	3	3	1	1	1	1	1	1	1	1	1	1	1	1	1	1	1

Source: La Liga
A = Away; H = Home; W = Win; D = Draw; L = Loss; P = Postponed

^{1} Matchday 19 (vs Mallorca) was brought forward due to both clubs' involvement in the 2025 Supercopa de España.
^{2} Matchday 27 (vs Osasuna) was postponed due to the death of Barcelona team doctor Carles Miñarro Garcia.

==== Matches ====
17 August 2024 1	Valencia	1–2	Barcelona	Valencia
21:30 CEST (UTC+2)	Pepelu (yellow card) 38'; Duro 44'; Vázquez (yellow card) 45+5'	Report	Cubarsí (yellow card) 45+2'; Lewandowski 45+5', 49' (pen.); Christensen (yellow card) 69'; Koundé (yellow card) 81'	Stadium: Mestalla; Attendance: 46,673; Referee: José María Sánchez Martínez

24 August 2024 2	Barcelona	2–1	Athletic Bilbao	Barcelona
19:00 CEST (UTC+2)	Yamal 24'; Cubarsí (yellow card) 41'; Bernal (yellow card) 49'; Lewandowski 75', (yellow card) 85'; Fermín (yellow card) 90+6'	Report	Yeray (yellow card) 38'; Sancet 42' (pen.); Berenguer (yellow card) 56'; Lekue (yellow card) 87'; Herrera (yellow card) 90+6'; Jauregizar (yellow card) 90+6'	Stadium: Estadi Olímpic Lluís Companys; Attendance: 46,448; Referee: Jesús Gil Manzano

27 August 2024 3	Rayo Vallecano	1–2	Barcelona	Madrid
21:30 CEST (UTC+2)	López 9'; Palazón (yellow card) 45+2'; Mumin (yellow card) 71'; Ciss (yellow card) 88'	Report	Pedri 60'; Olmo 82'; Bernal (yellow card) 90+4'	Stadium: Vallecas; Attendance: 14,031; Referee: César Soto Grado

31 August 2024 4	Barcelona	7–0	Valladolid	Barcelona
17:00 CEST (UTC+2)	Raphinha 20', 64', 72'; Lewandowski 24'; Koundé 45+2'; Olmo 82'; Torres 85'	Report	J. Sánchez (yellow card) 45'; K. Pérez (yellow card) 74'; Martín (yellow card) 84'	Stadium: Estadi Olímpic Lluís Companys; Attendance: 44,359; Referee: Isidro Díaz de Mera Escuderos

15 September 2024 5	Girona	1–4	Barcelona	Girona
16:15 CEST (UTC+2)	Gil (yellow card) 36'; Stuani 80', (yellow card) 90+6'; Portu (yellow card) 90+1'	Report	Yamal 30', 37', (yellow card) 90+1'; Olmo 47'; Pedri 64'; Víctor (yellow card) 84'; Torres (red card) 86'	Stadium: Montilivi; Attendance: 13,891; Referee: Alejandro Muñiz Ruiz

22 September 2024 6	Villarreal	1–5	Barcelona	Villarreal
18:30 CEST (UTC+2)	Parejo (yellow card) 2'; Pérez 38', (yellow card) 85'; Baena (yellow card) 52'; Bailly (yellow card) 66'; Cardona (yellow card) 89'; Akhomach (yellow card) 90+1'	Report	Lewandowski 20', 35', (penalty missed) 67'; Torre 58'; Raphinha 75', 83'; Víctor (yellow card) 82'	Stadium: Estadio de la Cerámica; Attendance: 22,048; Referee: Mateo Busquets Ferrer

25 September 2024 7	Barcelona	1–0	Getafe	Barcelona
21:00 CEST (UTC+2)	Lewandowski 19'; Raphinha (yellow card) 79'	Report	Arambarri (yellow card) 69'	Stadium: Estadi Olímpic Lluís Companys; Attendance: 44,407; Referee: Pablo González Fuertes

28 September 2024 8	Osasuna	4–2	Barcelona	Pamplona
21:00 CEST (UTC+2)	Budimir 18', 72' (pen.); Zaragoza 28', (yellow card) 69'; Ibáñez (yellow card) 61'; Bretones 85'	Report	Víctor 53'; Domínguez (yellow card) 71'; Yamal 89'; Pedri (yellow card) 90+5'	Stadium: El Sadar; Attendance: 22,322; Referee: Guillermo Cuadra Fernández

6 October 2024 9	Alavés	0–3	Barcelona	Vitoria-Gasteiz
16:15 CEST (UTC+2)	Tenaglia (yellow card) 31'; Mouriño (yellow card) 54'	Report	Lewandowski 7', 22', 32'; Martínez (yellow card) 53'; Martín (yellow card) 86'	Stadium: Mendizorrotza; Attendance: 19,468; Referee: Miguel Ángel Ortiz Arias

20 October 2024 10	Barcelona	5–1	Sevilla	Barcelona
21:00 CEST (UTC+2)	Lewandowski 24' (pen.), 39'; Pedri 28'; Fati (yellow card) 74'; Torre 82', 88'	Report	Pedrosa (yellow card) 45+4'; Sow (yellow card) 85'; Idumbo 87'	Stadium: Estadi Olímpic Lluís Companys; Attendance: 47,848; Referee: Ricardo de Burgos Bengoetxea

26 October 2024 11	Real Madrid	0–4	Barcelona	Madrid
21:00 CET (UTC+1)	Vinícius (yellow card) 80'; Militão (yellow card) 87'	Report	Casadó (yellow card) 44'; Lewandowski 54', 56'; Koundé (yellow card) 69'; Martínez (yellow card) 75'; Yamal 77'; Peña (yellow card) 82'; Raphinha 84'; Gavi (yellow card) 90'	Stadium: Santiago Bernabéu; Attendance: 78,192; Referee: José María Sánchez Martínez

3 November 2024 12	Barcelona	3–1	Espanyol	Barcelona
16:15 CET (UTC+1)	Olmo 12', 31'; Raphinha 23'	Report	Carreras (yellow card) 11'; Bauzà (yellow card) 54'; Puado 63'; Cheddira (yellow card) 81'	Stadium: Estadi Olímpic Lluís Companys; Attendance: 48,843; Referee: José Luis Munuera Montero

10 November 2024 13	Real Sociedad	1–0	Barcelona	San Sebastián
21:00 CET (UTC+1)	Aramburu (yellow card) 20'; Becker 33'; Méndez (yellow card) 82'; Zubeldia (yellow card) 87'	Report	Martínez (yellow card) 53'	Stadium: Anoeta; Attendance: 36,194; Referee: Guillermo Cuadra Fernández

23 November 2024 14	Celta Vigo	2–2	Barcelona	Vigo
21:00 CET (UTC+1)	Aspas (yellow card) 45+1'; Rodríguez (yellow card) 60'; Alfon 84'; Álvarez 86'; Sotelo (yellow card) 87'; Moriba (yellow card) 90+3'; Alonso (yellow card) 90+5'	Report	Martín (yellow card) 3'; Raphinha 15'; Lewandowski 61'; Casadó (yellow card) 75' (yellow-red card) 82'; Fort (yellow card) 80'; Fermín (yellow card) 90+1'	Stadium: Abanca-Balaídos; Attendance: 24,573; Referee: César Soto Grado

30 November 2024 15	Barcelona	1–2	Las Palmas	Barcelona
14:00 CET (UTC+1)	Raphinha 61'	Report	Sandro 49'; Silva 67'	Stadium: Estadi Olímpic Lluís Companys; Attendance: 43,921; Referee: Adrián Cordero Vega
Note: This match served to commemorate the club's 125th anniversary.

3 December 2024 19	Mallorca	1–5	Barcelona	Palma
19:00 CET (UTC+1)	Maffeo (yellow card) 34'; Muriqi 43'; Raíllo (yellow card) 51'; Mojica (yellow card) 55'; Abdón (yellow card) 58'	Report	Cubarsí (yellow card) 3'; Torres 12'; Casadó (yellow card) 23'; Pedri (yellow card) 60'; Raphinha 56' (pen.), 74'; De Jong 79'; Víctor 84'	Stadium: Visit Mallorca Estadi; Attendance: 22,352; Referee: Jesús Gil Manzano
Note: This match was originally scheduled for January 2025; however, it was rescheduled due to both clubs' involvement in the 2025 Supercopa de España.

7 December 2024 16	Real Betis	2–2	Barcelona	Seville
16:15 CET (UTC+1)	Flores (yellow card) 35'; Lo Celso 68' (pen.); Diao 90+4'	Report	Lewandowski 39'; De Jong (yellow card) 66'; Torres 82'; Fort (yellow card) 90'	Stadium: Benito Villamarín; Attendance: 51,749; Referee: Alejandro Muñiz Ruiz

15 December 2024 17	Barcelona	0–1	Leganés	Barcelona
21:00 CET (UTC+1)		Report	González 4'; Cissé (yellow card) 74'; Hernández (yellow card) 90+5'	Stadium: Estadi Olímpic Lluís Companys; Attendance: 39,523; Referee: Alejandro Quintero González

21 December 2024 18	Barcelona	1–2	Atlético Madrid	Barcelona
21:00 CET (UTC+1)	Pedri 30'	Report	Witsel (yellow card) 54'; De Paul 60'; Le Normand (yellow card) 77'; Sørloth 90+6'; Giménez (yellow card) 90+6'	Stadium: Estadi Olímpic Lluís Companys; Attendance: 46,249; Referee: Ricardo de Burgos Bengoetxea

18 January 2025 20	Getafe	1–1	Barcelona	Getafe
21:00 CET (UTC+1)	Arambarri 34'; Santiago (yellow card) 53'; Djené (yellow card) 86'; Bekhoucha (yellow card) 90+5'	Report	Koundé 9'; Raphinha (yellow card) 90+5'; Balde (yellow card) 90+6'	Stadium: Coliseum; Attendance: 15,134; Referee: Pablo González Fuertes

26 January 2025 21	Barcelona	7–1	Valencia	Barcelona
21:00 CET (UTC+1)	De Jong 3'; Torres 8'; Raphinha 14'; Fermín 24', 45+4'; Lewandowski 66'; Tárrega 75' (o.g.)	Report	Duro 59'; Pepelu (yellow card) 70'	Stadium: Estadi Olímpic Lluís Companys; Attendance: 45,312; Referee: César Soto Grado

2 February 2025 22	Barcelona	1–0	Alavés	Barcelona
14:00 CET (UTC+1)	Gavi (yellow card) 7'; Araújo (yellow card) 34'; Lewandowski 61'; Raphinha (yellow card) 67'; Fermín (yellow card) 89'; Yamal (yellow card) 89'	Report	Tenaglia (yellow card) 55'; Protesoni (yellow card) 65'	Stadium: Estadi Olímpic Lluís Companys; Attendance: 42,900; Referee: José Luis Munuera Montero

9 February 2025 23	Sevilla	1–4	Barcelona	Seville
21:00 CET (UTC+1)	Vargas 8'; Saúl (yellow card) 16'; Romero (yellow card) 45+4'; Badé (yellow card) 67'; Marcão (yellow card) 88'; Suso (yellow card) 90+5'	Report	Lewandowski 7'; Gavi (yellow card) 38'; Fermín 46', (red card) 62'; Raphinha 55'; García (yellow card) 80', (goal) 89'	Stadium: Ramón Sánchez Pizjuán; Attendance: 38,592; Referee: Alejandro Hernández Hernández

17 February 2025 24	Barcelona	1–0	Rayo Vallecano	Barcelona
21:00 CET (UTC+1)	Lewandowski 28' (pen.); Gavi (yellow card) 45+2'; Torres (yellow card) 90+5'	Report	Ciss (yellow card) 27'; Rațiu (yellow card) 41'; Embarba (yellow card) 87'	Stadium: Estadi Olímpic Lluís Companys; Attendance: 45,296; Referee: Mario Melero López

22 February 2025 25	Las Palmas	0–2	Barcelona	Las Palmas
21:00 CET (UTC+1)	Suárez (yellow card) 80'	Report	Olmo 62'; De Jong (yellow card) 82'; Torres 90+5'	Stadium: Estadio Gran Canaria; Attendance: 30,746; Referee: Adrián Cordero Vega

2 March 2025 26	Barcelona	4–0	Real Sociedad	Barcelona
16:15 CET (UTC+1)	Martín 25'; Casadó 29'; Araújo 56'; Lewandowski 60'	Report	Elustondo (red card) 17'	Stadium: Estadi Olímpic Lluís Companys; Attendance: 46,324; Referee: Alejandro Quintero González

16 March 2025 28	Atlético Madrid	2–4	Barcelona	Madrid
21:00 CET (UTC+1)	Mandava (yellow card) 36'; Alvarez 45'; Sørloth 70'	Report	Koundé (yellow card) 26'; Balde (yellow card) 64'; Lewandowski 72'; Torres 78', 90+8'; Yamal 90+2', (yellow card) 90+3'	Stadium: Riyadh Air Metropolitano; Attendance: 67,602; Referee: Ricardo de Burgos Bengoetxea

27 March 2025 27	Barcelona	3–0	Osasuna	Barcelona
21:00 CET (UTC+1)	Torres 11'; Olmo 21' (pen.); García (yellow card) 40'; Lewandowski 77'	Report	Herrera (yellow card) 18'; Catena (yellow card) 38'; Cruz (yellow card) 50'	Stadium: Estadi Olímpic Lluís Companys; Attendance: 42,319; Referee: Mateo Busquets Ferrer
Note: This match was originally scheduled for 8 March 2025; however, it was rescheduled due to the death of Barcelona's doctor Carles Miñarro Garcia.

30 March 2025 29	Barcelona	4–1	Girona	Barcelona
16:15 CEST (UTC+2)	Krejčí 43' (o.g.); Lewandowski 61', 77'; Torres 86'	Report	Herrera (yellow card) 42'; Danjuma 53'	Stadium: Estadi Olímpic Lluís Companys; Attendance: 48,258; Referee: Juan Luis Pulido Santana

5 April 2025 30	Barcelona	1–1	Real Betis	Barcelona
21:00 CEST (UTC+2)	Gavi 7'; García (yellow card) 77'; Koundé (yellow card) 87'	Report	Natan (yellow card) 14', (goal) 17'	Stadium: Estadi Olímpic Lluís Companys; Attendance: 47,043; Referee: Jesús Gil Manzano

12 April 2025 31	Leganés	0–1	Barcelona	Leganés
21:00 CEST (UTC+2)	Altimira (yellow card) 7'; Raba (yellow card) 87'	Report	Jorge 48' (o.g.); De Jong (yellow card) 87'	Stadium: Butarque; Attendance: 12,530; Referee: Francisco José Hernández Maeso

19 April 2025 32	Barcelona	4–3	Celta Vigo	Barcelona
16:15 CEST (UTC+2)	Torres 12'; Olmo 64'; Raphinha 68', 90+8' (pen.), (yellow card) 90+2'; Martínez (yellow card) 90+3'	Report	Iglesias 15', 52', 62'; Aspas (yellow card) 90+2'; Mingueza (yellow card) 90+8'	Stadium: Estadi Olímpic Lluís Companys; Attendance: 48,569; Referee: Mario Melero López

22 April 2025 33	Barcelona	1–0	Mallorca	Barcelona
17:00 CEST (UTC+2)	Olmo 46'	Report	Costa (yellow card) 25'	Stadium: Estadi Olímpic Lluís Companys; Attendance: 45,602; Referee: Miguel Ángel Ortiz Arias

3 May 2025 34	Valladolid	1–2	Barcelona	Valladolid
21:00 CEST (UTC+2)	Sánchez 6'; Sylla (yellow card) 8'; Tuhami (yellow card) 37'; Martín (yellow card) 90'	Report	Raphinha 54'; Fermín 60'; Christensen (yellow card) 66'; Araújo (yellow card) 83'	Stadium: José Zorrilla; Attendance: 23,967; Referee: Alejandro Muñiz Ruiz

11 May 2025 35	Barcelona	4–3	Real Madrid	Barcelona
16:15 CEST (UTC+2)	García 19'; Yamal 32'; Raphinha 34', 45'; Araújo (yellow card) 45'; Martínez (yellow card) 54'; Fermín (yellow card) 80'; Pedri (yellow card) 87'	Report	Mbappé 5' (pen.), 14', 70'; Valverde (yellow card) 29'; Tchouaméni (yellow card) 36'; Asencio (yellow card) 50'	Stadium: Estadi Olímpic Lluís Companys; Attendance: 50,319; Referee: Alejandro Hernández Hernández

15 May 2025 36	Espanyol	0–2	Barcelona	Cornellà de Llobregat
21:30 CEST (UTC+2)	Cabrera (red card) 80'; Cheddira (yellow card) 84'; Kumbulla (yellow card) 90'	Report	Christensen (yellow card) 42'; Yamal 53'; Szczęsny (yellow card) 90+5'; Fermín 90+5'	Stadium: Stage Front Stadium; Attendance: 34,283; Referee: César Soto Grado

18 May 2025 37	Barcelona	2–3	Villarreal	Barcelona
19:00 CEST (UTC+2)	Yamal 38'; García (yellow card) 43'; Fermín 45+5'	Report	Pérez 4'; Comesaña 50'; Buchanan 80'	Stadium: Estadi Olímpic Lluís Companys; Attendance: 49,558; Referee: José Luis Munuera Montero

25 May 2025 38	Athletic Bilbao	0–3	Barcelona	Bilbao
21:00 CEST (UTC+2)	Berchiche (yellow card) 75'	Report	Lewandowski 14', 17'; Olmo 90+4' (pen.)	Stadium: San Mamés; Attendance: 50,231; Referee: Pablo González Fuertes

=== Copa del Rey ===
4 January 2025 Round of 32	Barbastro	0–4	Barcelona	Barbastro
19:00 CET (UTC+1)	Alonso (yellow card) 43'	Report	García 21'; Lewandowski 31', 47', (yellow card) 51'; Torre 56'	Stadium: Municipal de Deportes; Attendance: 5,500; Referee: Isidro Díaz de Mera Escuderos

15 January 2025 Round of 16	Barcelona	5–1	Real Betis	Barcelona
21:00 CET (UTC+1)	Gavi 3', (yellow card) 63'; Koundé 27'; Raphinha (yellow card) 50', (goal) 58'; Torres 67'; Yamal 75'	Report	Bartra (yellow card) 42'; Vitor Roque 84' (pen.); Flores (yellow card) 86'	Stadium: Estadi Olímpic Lluís Companys; Attendance: 46,019; Referee: José María Sánchez Martínez

6 February 2025 Quarter-finals	Valencia	0–5	Barcelona	Valencia
21:30 CET (UTC+1)	Pérez (yellow card) 45+1'; Sadiq (yellow card) 45+1'	Report	Torres 3', 17', 30'; Fermín 23'; Yamal 59'	Stadium: Mestalla; Attendance: 46,806; Referee: Miguel Ángel Ortiz Arias

25 February 2025 Semi-finals; First leg	Barcelona	4–4	Atlético Madrid	Barcelona
21:30 CET (UTC+1)	Pedri 19'; Cubarsí 21'; Martínez 41'; Lewandowski 74'	Report	Alvarez 1'; Griezmann 6'; Galán (yellow card) 16'; Giménez (yellow card) 82'; Llorente 84'; Barrios (yellow card) 88'; Sørloth (yellow card) 90+1', (goal) 90+3'	Stadium: Estadi Olímpic Lluís Companys; Attendance: 40,915; Referee: Alejandro Hernández Hernández

2 April 2025 Semi-finals; Second leg	Atlético Madrid	0–1 (4–5 agg.)	Barcelona	Madrid
21:30 CEST (UTC+2)	Azpilicueta (yellow card) 6'; De Paul (yellow card) 13'; Mandava (yellow card) 31'; Alvarez (yellow card) 45+3'; Molina (yellow card) 59'	Report	Torres 27'; De Jong (yellow card) 35'; Balde (yellow card) 68'; Martín (yellow card) 90+3'	Stadium: Riyadh Air Metropolitano; Attendance: 69,014; Referee: José Luis Munuera Montero

26 April 2025 Final	Barcelona	3–2 (a.e.t.)	Real Madrid	Seville
22:00 CEST (UTC+2)	Pedri 28'; Martín (yellow card) 37'; De Jong (yellow card) 68'; Torres 84'; Fermín (yellow card) 90+4'; Raphinha (yellow card) 90+10'; Koundé 116'	Report	Mbappé 70'; Tchouaméni (yellow card) 31', (goal) 77'; Modrić (yellow card) 90+1'; Bellingham (yellow card) 107', (red card) 120+4'; Rüdiger (red card) 120+3'; Vázquez (red card) 120+3'	Stadium: La Cartuja; Attendance: 55,579; Referee: Ricardo de Burgos Bengoetxea
Note: Rüdiger, Vázquez and Bellingham received red cards after being substituted out of the match.

=== Supercopa de España ===
8 January 2025 Semi-finals	Athletic Bilbao	0–2	Barcelona	Jeddah, Saudi Arabia
22:00 SAST (UTC+3)	Berenguer (yellow card) 50'; Gómez (yellow card) 76'	Report	Gavi 17'; Yamal 52'	Stadium: King Abdullah Sports City; Attendance: 42,000; Referee: Miguel Ángel Ortiz Arias

12 January 2025 Final	Real Madrid	2–5	Barcelona	Jeddah, Saudi Arabia
22:00 SAST (UTC+3)	Mbappé 5'; Camavinga (yellow card) 35'; Rüdiger (yellow card) 53'; Vinícius (yellow card) 55'; Rodrygo 60'; Asencio (yellow card) 77'	Report	Yamal 22'; Lewandowski 36' (pen.), (yellow card) 77'; Raphinha 39', 48', (yellow card) 89'; Martínez (yellow card) 45+9'; Balde 45+10'; Szczęsny (red card) 56'; Araújo (yellow card) 87'	Stadium: King Abdullah Sports City; Attendance: 60,000; Referee: Jesús Gil Manzano

=== UEFA Champions League ===
==== League phase ====
The draw for the league phase was held on 29 August 2024.

Pos	Team	Pld	W	D	L	GF	GA	GD	Pts	Qualification
1	(The Football Association) Liverpool	8	7	0	1	17	5	+12	21	Advance to round of 16 (seeded)
2	(Royal Spanish Football Federation) Barcelona	8	6	1	1	28	13	+15	19	Advance to round of 16 (seeded)
3	(The Football Association) Arsenal	8	6	1	1	16	3	+13	19	Advance to round of 16 (seeded)
4	(Italian Football Federation) Inter Milan	8	6	1	1	11	1	+10	19	Advance to round of 16 (seeded)
5	(Royal Spanish Football Federation) Atlético Madrid	8	6	0	2	20	12	+8	18	Advance to round of 16 (seeded)

Source: UEFA
Rules for classification: League phase tiebreakers

Round	1	2	3	4	5	6	7	8
Ground	A	H	H	A	H	A	A	H
Result	L	W	W	W	W	W	W	D
Position	22	16	10	6	3	2	2	2
Points	0	3	6	9	12	15	18	19

Source: UEFA
A = Away; H = Home; W = Win; D = Draw; L = Loss

19 September 2024 1	Monaco (France)	2–1	(Spain) Barcelona	Monaco
21:00 CEST (UTC+2)	Akliouche 16'; Ben Seghir (yellow card) 30'; Camara (yellow card) 36'; Ilenikhena 71'; Zakaria (yellow card) 90+2'; Balogun (yellow card) 90+6'	Report	García (red card) 11'; Yamal 28'; Martínez (yellow card) 75'; Balde (yellow card) 85'; Casadó (yellow card) 85'	Stadium: Stade Louis II; Attendance: 13,296; Referee: Allard Lindhout (Netherlands)

1 October 2024 2	Barcelona (Spain)	5–0	(Switzerland) Young Boys	Barcelona, Spain
21:00 CEST (UTC+2)	Lewandowski 8', 51'; Raphinha 34'; Martínez 37'; Camara 81' (o.g.)	Report	Colley (yellow card) 36'; Ugrinić (yellow card) 40'	Stadium: Estadi Olímpic Lluís Companys; Attendance: 45,097; Referee: Erik Lambrechts (Belgium)

23 October 2024 3	Barcelona (Spain)	4–1	(Germany) Bayern Munich	Barcelona, Spain
21:00 CEST (UTC+2)	Raphinha 1', 45', 56'; Lewandowski 36'	Report	Kane 18'; Kimmich (yellow card) 27'; Goretzka (yellow card) 90'	Stadium: Estadi Olímpic Lluís Companys; Attendance: 50,312; Referee: Slavko Vinčić (Slovenia)

6 November 2024 4	Red Star Belgrade (Serbia)	2–5	(Spain) Barcelona	Belgrade, Serbia
21:00 CET (UTC+1)	Silas 27'; Ndiaye (yellow card) 61'; Spajić (yellow card) 64'; Milson 84'	Report	Martínez 13'; Lewandowski 43', 53'; Raphinha 55'; Fermín 76'	Stadium: Rajko Mitić Stadium; Attendance: 48,886; Referee: Espen Eskås (Norway)

26 November 2024 5	Barcelona (Spain)	3–0	(France) Brest	Barcelona, Spain
21:00 CET (UTC+1)	Lewandowski 10' (pen.), 90+2'; Olmo 66'	Report	Lala (yellow card) 24'; Camara (yellow card) 63'; Ajorque (yellow card) 74'; Le Cardinal (yellow card) 81'	Stadium: Estadi Olímpic Lluís Companys; Attendance: 46,317; Referee: Irfan Peljto (Bosnia and Herzegovina)

11 December 2024 6	Borussia Dortmund (Germany)	2–3	(Spain) Barcelona	Dortmund, Germany
21:00 CET (UTC+1)	Sabitzer (yellow card) 42'; Nmecha (yellow card) 51'; Couto (yellow card) 57'; Bensebaini (yellow card) 58'; Guirassy 60' (pen.), 78'	Report	Raphinha 53'; Cubarsí (yellow card) 58'; Torres 75', 85', (yellow card) 90+2'	Stadium: Westfalenstadion; Attendance: 81,365; Referee: François Letexier (France)

21 January 2025 7	Benfica (Portugal)	4–5	(Spain) Barcelona	Lisbon, Portugal
20:00 WET (UTC+0)	Pavlidis 2', 22', 30' (pen.); Araújo 68' (o.g.); Carreras (yellow card) 76'; Cabral (red card) 90+8'	Report	Lewandowski 13' (pen.), 78' (pen.); Gavi (yellow card) 36'; Raphinha 64', 90+6'; Koundé (yellow card) 66'; García 86'; De Jong (yellow card) 90+4'; Fermín (yellow card) 90+8'	Stadium: Estádio da Luz; Attendance: 63,225; Referee: Danny Makkelie (Netherlands)
Note: Cabral received a red card for dissent as an unused substitute.

29 January 2025 8	Barcelona (Spain)	2–2	(Italy) Atalanta	Barcelona, Spain
21:00 CET (UTC+1)	Yamal 47'; Araújo 72'	Report	Kolašinac (yellow card) 51'; Éderson 67', (yellow card) 90+7'; Pašalić 79', (yellow card) 90+7'; De Roon (yellow card) 90+3'	Stadium: Estadi Olímpic Lluís Companys; Attendance: 42,728; Referee: Michael Oliver (England)

==== Knockout phase ====
===== Round of 16 =====
The draw for the round of 16 was held on 21 February 2025.

5 March 2025 First leg	Benfica (Portugal)	0–1	(Spain) Barcelona	Lisbon, Portugal
20:00 WET (UTC+0)	Barreiro (yellow card) 45'; A. Silva (yellow card) 45+5'; Carreras (yellow card) 73'; Rego (yellow card) 90+1'	Report	Cubarsí (red card) 22'; Martínez (yellow card) 45+2'; Raphinha 61'	Stadium: Estádio da Luz; Attendance: 62,437; Referee: Felix Zwayer (Germany)

11 March 2025 Second leg	Barcelona (Spain)	3–1 (4–1 agg.)	(Portugal) Benfica	Barcelona, Spain
18:45 CET (UTC+1)	Raphinha 11', 42'; Yamal 27'	Report	Otamendi 13'; A. Silva (yellow card) 48'	Stadium: Estadi Olímpic Lluís Companys; Attendance: 47,111; Referee: François Letexier (France)

===== Quarter-finals =====
The draw for the order of the quarter-final legs was held on 21 February 2025, after the draw for the round of 16.

9 April 2025 First leg	Barcelona (Spain)	4–0	(Germany) Borussia Dortmund	Barcelona, Spain
21:00 CEST (UTC+2)	Raphinha 25'; Lewandowski 48', 66'; Yamal 77'	Report	Adeyemi (yellow card) 24'; Guirassy (yellow card) 74'	Stadium: Estadi Olímpic Lluís Companys; Attendance: 49,760; Referee: Espen Eskås (Norway)

15 April 2025 Second leg	Borussia Dortmund (Germany)	3–1 (3–5 agg.)	(Spain) Barcelona	Dortmund, Germany
21:00 CEST (UTC+2)	Guirassy 11' (pen.), 49', 76'; Nmecha (yellow card) 56'	Report	De Jong (yellow card) 35'; Bensebaini 54' (o.g.)	Stadium: Westfalenstadion; Attendance: 81,365; Referee: Maurizio Mariani (Italy)

===== Semi-finals =====
The draw for the order of the semi-final legs was held on 21 February 2025, after the draw for the round of 16 and quarter-finals.

30 April 2025 First leg	Barcelona (Spain)	3–3	(Italy) Inter Milan	Barcelona, Spain
21:00 CEST (UTC+2)	Yamal 24'; Torres 38'; Sommer 65' (o.g.); Cubarsí (yellow card) 70'	Report	Thuram 1'; Dumfries 21', 64'; Çalhanoğlu (yellow card) 59'	Stadium: Estadi Olímpic Lluís Companys; Attendance: 50,314; Referee: Clément Turpin (France)

6 May 2025 Second leg	Inter Milan (Italy)	4–3 (a.e.t.) (7–6 agg.)	(Spain) Barcelona	Milan, Italy
21:00 CEST (UTC+2)	L. Martínez 21'; Çalhanoğlu (yellow card) 36', (goal) 45+1' (pen.); Mkhitaryan (yellow card) 68'; Acerbi 90+3', (yellow card) 90+5'; Carlos Augusto (yellow card) 91'; Frattesi 99'; Bastoni (yellow card) 118'	Report	Martínez (yellow card) 51'; García 54'; Olmo 60'; Raphinha 87'; Víctor (yellow card) 90+5'	Stadium: San Siro; Attendance: 75,504; Referee: Szymon Marciniak (Poland)

== Statistics ==
=== Overall ===
No.	Pos.	Nat.	Player	La Liga		Copa del Rey		Supercopa de España		Champions League		Total		Discipline		Notes
No.	Pos.	Nat.	Player	Apps	Goals	Apps	Goals	Apps	Goals	Apps	Goals	Apps	Goals	Yellow card	Red card	Notes
Goalkeepers
1	GK	(Germany)	Marc-André ter Stegen	8	0	0	0	0	0	1	0	9	0	0	0	
13	GK	(Spain)	Iñaki Peña	15+1	0	1	0	0+1	0	5	0	23	0	1	0	
25	GK	(Poland)	Wojciech Szczęsny	15	0	5	0	2	0	8	0	30	0	0	1	
Defenders
2	DF	(Spain)	Pau Cubarsí	29+6	0	5+1	1	2	0	12+1	0	56	1	5	1	
3	DF	(Spain)	Alejandro Balde	26+6	0	3	0	2	1	9+1	0	47	1	3	0	
4	DF	(Uruguay)	Ronald Araújo	11+1	1	2+2	0	0+1	0	4+4	1	25	2	4	0	
5	DF	(Spain)	Iñigo Martínez	28	0	4+1	1	2	0	11	2	46	3	9	0	
15	DF	(Denmark)	Andreas Christensen	2+3	0	0	0	0	0	0+1	0	6	0	3	0	
23	DF	(France)	Jules Koundé	29+3	2	6	2	2	0	13	0	53	4	6	0	
24	DF	(Spain)	Eric García	14+15	2	2+4	1	0+1	0	3+6	2	45	5	3	1	
32	DF	(Spain)	Héctor Fort	5+12	0	0+1	0	0	0	0+2	0	20	0	2	0	
35	DF	(Spain)	Gerard Martín	11+17	1	3+2	0	0+1	0	5+3	0	42	1	4	0	
36	DF	(Spain)	Sergi Domínguez	2+1	0	0+1	0	0	0	0+2	0	6	0	1	0	
39	DF	(Spain)	Andrés Cuenca	0	0	0	0	0	0	0+1	0	1	0	0	0	
Midfielders
6	MF	(Spain)	Gavi	14+12	1	1+3	1	2	1	3+7	0	42	3	5	0	
8	MF	(Spain)	Pedri	35+2	4	6	2	2	0	13+1	0	59	6	3	0	
14	MF	(Spain)	Pablo Torre	5+5	3	1+1	1	0	0	0+2	0	13	4	0	0	
16	MF	(Spain)	Fermín López	12+16	6	3+3	1	0+1	0	4+7	1	46	8	7	1	
17	MF	(Spain)	Marc Casadó	20+3	1	0+1	0	2	0	7+3	0	35	1	5	1	
20	MF	(Spain)	Dani Olmo	13+12	10	3+1	0	0+1	0	6+3	2	39	12	1	0	
21	MF	(Netherlands)	Frenkie de Jong	9+17	2	6	0	0+1	0	8+5	0	46	2	6	0	
28	MF	(Spain)	Marc Bernal	3	0	0	0	0	0	0	0	3	0	2	0	
Forwards
7	FW	(Spain)	Ferran Torres	12+15	10	4+1	6	0+2	0	3+8	3	45	19	2	1	
9	FW	(Poland)	Robert Lewandowski	33+1	27	1+2	3	2	1	12+1	11	52	42	3	0	
10	FW	(Spain)	Ansu Fati	3+3	0	0+1	0	0	0	0+4	0	11	0	1	0	
11	FW	(Brazil)	Raphinha	32+4	18	5	1	2	2	14	13	57	34	8	0	
18	FW	(Spain)	Pau Víctor	2+19	2	0+2	0	0	0	0+6	0	29	2	3	0	
19	FW	(Spain)	Lamine Yamal	31+4	9	5	2	2	2	13	5	55	18	3	0	
42	FW	(Spain)	Toni Fernández	0	0	0+1	0	0	0	0	0	1	0	0	0	
46	FW	(Spain)	Dani Rodríguez	1	0	0	0	0	0	0	0	1	0	0	0	

=== Goalscorers ===
Rank	No.	Pos.	Nat.	Player	La Liga	Copa del Rey	Supercopa de España	Champions League	Total
1	9	FW	(Poland)	Robert Lewandowski	27	3	1	11	42
2	11	FW	(Brazil)	Raphinha	18	1	2	13	34
3	7	FW	(Spain)	Ferran Torres	10	6	—	3	19
4	19	FW	(Spain)	Lamine Yamal	9	2	2	5	18
5	20	MF	(Spain)	Dani Olmo	10	—	—	2	12
6	16	MF	(Spain)	Fermín López	6	1	—	1	8
7	8	MF	(Spain)	Pedri	4	2	—	—	6
8	24	DF	(Spain)	Eric García	2	1	—	2	5
9	14	MF	(Spain)	Pablo Torre	3	1	—	—	4
9	23	DF	(France)	Jules Koundé	2	2	—	—	4
11	5	DF	(Spain)	Iñigo Martínez	—	1	—	2	3
11	6	MF	(Spain)	Gavi	1	1	1	—	3
13	18	FW	(Spain)	Pau Víctor	2	—	—	—	2
13	21	MF	(Netherlands)	Frenkie de Jong	2	—	—	—	2
13	4	DF	(Uruguay)	Ronald Araujo	1	—	—	1	2
16	3	DF	(Spain)	Alejandro Balde	—	—	1	—	1
16	2	DF	(Spain)	Pau Cubarsí	—	1	—	—	1
16	17	MF	(Spain)	Marc Casadó	1	—	—	—	1
16	35	DF	(Spain)	Gerard Martín	1	—	—	—	1
Own goals (from the opponents)					3	—	—	3	6
Totals					102	22	7	43	174

=== Hat-tricks ===
Player	Against	Minutes	Score after goals	Result	Date	Competition	Ref
(Brazil) Raphinha	(Spain) Valladolid	20', 64', 72'	1–0, 4–0, 5–0	7–0 (H)	31 August 2024	La Liga	
(Poland) Robert Lewandowski	(Spain) Alavés	7', 22', 32'	0–1, 0–2, 0–3	0–3 (A)	6 October 2024	La Liga	
(Brazil) Raphinha	(Germany) Bayern Munich	1', 45', 56'	1–0, 3–1, 4–1	4–1 (H)	23 October 2024	Champions League	
(Spain) Ferran Torres	(Spain) Valencia	3', 17', 30'	0–1, 0–2, 0–4	0–5 (A)	6 February 2025	Copa del Rey	

(H) – Home; (A) – Away

=== Clean sheets ===
Rank	No.	Nat.	Player	La Liga	Copa del Rey	Supercopa de España	Champions League	Total
1	25	(Poland)	Wojciech Szczęsny	8	3	1	2	14
2	13	(Spain)	Iñaki Peña	4	—	—	2	6
3	1	(Germany)	Marc-André ter Stegen	1	—	—	0	1
Totals				13	3	1	4	21

=== Disciplinary record ===
No.	Pos.	Nat.	Player	La Liga			Copa del Rey			Supercopa de España			Champions League			Total		
No.	Pos.	Nat.	Player	Yellow card	(yellow card) (yellow-red card)	Red card	Yellow card	(yellow card) (yellow-red card)	Red card	Yellow card	(yellow card) (yellow-red card)	Red card	Yellow card	(yellow card) (yellow-red card)	Red card	Yellow card	(yellow card) (yellow-red card)	Red card
16	MF	(Spain)	Fermín López	4		1	1						1			6		1
2	DF	(Spain)	Pau Cubarsí	3									2		1	5		1
24	DF	(Spain)	Eric García	4											1	4		1
7	FW	(Spain)	Ferran Torres	1		1							1			2		1
17	MF	(Spain)	Marc Casadó	2	1								1			3	1	
5	DF	(Spain)	Iñigo Martínez	5						1			3			9		
11	FW	(Brazil)	Raphinha	4			2			1						8		
21	MF	(Netherlands)	Frenkie de Jong	3			2						2			7		
23	DF	(France)	Jules Koundé	4						1			1			6		
6	MF	(Spain)	Gavi	4			1						1			6		
4	DF	(Uruguay)	Ronald Araújo	3						1						4		
35	DF	(Spain)	Gerard Martín	2			2									4		
3	DF	(Spain)	Alejandro Balde	2			1						1			4		
19	FW	(Spain)	Lamine Yamal	3												3		
8	MF	(Spain)	Pedri	3												3		
18	FW	(Spain)	Pau Víctor	2									1			3		
9	FW	(Poland)	Robert Lewandowski	1			1			1						3		
28	MF	(Spain)	Marc Bernal	2												2		
15	DF	(Denmark)	Andreas Christensen	3												3		
32	DF	(Spain)	Héctor Fort	2												2		
36	DF	(Spain)	Sergi Domínguez	1												1		
10	FW	(Spain)	Ansu Fati	1												1		
13	GK	(Spain)	Iñaki Peña	1												1		
20	MF	(Spain)	Dani Olmo	1												1		
Coach		(Germany)	Hansi Flick	1		1							1			2		1
Totals				62	1	3	10			5			15		2	92	1	5

Source: FC Barcelona
Ordered by (red card) , (second yellow card) and (yellow card)
(yellow card) = Number of bookings; (second yellow card) = Number of sending offs after a second yellow card; (red card) = Number of sending offs by a direct red card.

=== Injury record ===
No.	Pos.	Nat.	Player	Type	Status	Source	Match	Inj. Date	Ret. Date
6	MF	(Spain)	Gavi	Anterior cruciate ligament tear — right knee		FCB.com	vs Georgia with Spain	19 November 2023	20 October 2024
3	DF	(Spain)	Alejandro Balde	Biceps femoris tendon rupture — right leg		FCB.com	vs Athletic Bilbao	24 January 2024	25 July 2024
21	MF	(Netherlands)	Frenkie de Jong	Ankle sprain — right ankle		FCB.com	vs Real Madrid	21 April 2024	1 October 2024
4	DF	(Uruguay)	Ronald Araújo	Tendon rupture — right hamstring		FCB.com	vs Brazil with Uruguay	7 July 2024	10 December 2024
14	MF	(Spain)	Pablo Torre	Fractured fifth metacarpal – left hand		FCB.com	in training	18 July 2024	30 July 2024
10	FW	(Spain)	Ansu Fati	Injured sole – righ foot		FCB.com	in training	24 July 2024	18 September 2024
15	DF	(Denmark)	Andreas Christensen	Tendinopathy – left achilles		FCB.com	vs Valencia	17 August 2024	17 January 2025
28	MF	(Spain)	Marc Bernal	Anterior cruciate ligament tear — left knee		FCB.com	vs Rayo Vallecano	27 August 2024	
16	MF	(Spain)	Fermín López	Hamstring injury – left leg		FCB.com	in training with Spain U21	3 September 2024	17 September 2024
20	MF	(Spain)	Dani Olmo	Hamstring injury – right leg		FCB.com	vs Girona	15 September 2024	20 October 2024
16	MF	(Spain)	Fermín López	Rectus femoris muscle injury – right leg		FCB.com	in training	17 September 2024	20 October 2024
1	GK	(Germany)	Marc-André ter Stegen	Patellar tendon rupture – right knee		FCB.com	vs Villarreal	22 September 2024	26 April 2025
7	FW	(Spain)	Ferran Torres	Biceps femoris tendon rupture — right leg		FCB.com	vs Alavés	6 October 2024	30 November 2024
19	FW	(Spain)	Lamine Yamal	Strained hamstring — left leg		FCB.com	vs Denmark with Spain	12 October 2024	20 October 2024
19	FW	(Spain)	Lamine Yamal	Syndesmosis injury — right ankle		FCB.com	vs Red Star Belgrade	6 November 2024	30 November 2024
9	FW	(Poland)	Robert Lewandowski	Lumbar injury		FCB.com	vs Real Sociedad	10 November 2024	23 November 2024
10	FW	(Spain)	Ansu Fati	Biceps femoris muscle injury — right leg		FCB.com	in training	13 November 2024	20 December 2024
19	FW	(Spain)	Lamine Yamal	Anterior tibiofibular ligament injury — right ankle		FCB.com	vs Leganés	15 December 2024	8 January 2025
7	FW	(Spain)	Ferran Torres	Soleus muscle injury — right leg		FCB.com	vs Atlético Madrid	21 December 2024	8 January 2025
5	DF	(Spain)	Iñigo Martínez	Hamstring injury — right leg		FCB.com	vs Real Madrid	14 January 2025	2 February 2025
20	MF	(Spain)	Dani Olmo	Calf strain – right leg		FCB.com	vs Getafe	18 January 2025	6 February 2025
15	DF	(Denmark)	Andreas Christensen	Calf injury – right leg		FCB.com	in training	28 January 2025	26 February 2025
6	MF	(Spain)	Gavi	Head injury		FCB.com	vs Alavés	2 February 2025	9 February 2025
15	DF	(Denmark)	Andreas Christensen	Soleus muscle injury – right leg		FCB.com	in training	1 March 2025	5 April 2025
17	MF	(Spain)	Marc Casadó	Lateral collateral ligament partial tear – right knee		FCB.com	vs Atlético Madrid	16 March 2025	11 May 2025
5	DF	(Spain)	Iñigo Martínez	Swollen – right knee		FCB.com	vs Atlético Madrid	16 March 2025	27 March 2025
20	MF	(Spain)	Dani Olmo	Adductor injury – right leg		FCB.com	vs Osasuna	28 March 2025	13 April 2025
3	DF	(Spain)	Alejandro Balde	Hamstring injury – left leg		FCB.com	vs Leganés	13 April 2025	11 May 2025
9	FW	(Poland)	Robert Lewandowski	Semitendinosus muscle injury – left leg		FCB.com	vs Celta Vigo	19 April 2025	5 May 2025
23	DF	(France)	Jules Koundé	Hamstring injury – left leg		FCB.com	vs Inter Milan	30 April 2025	
46	FW	(Spain)	Dani Rodríguez	Dislocated shoulder – right shoulder		FCB.com	vs Valladolid	3 May 2025	
7	FW	(Spain)	Ferran Torres	Appendicitis		FCB.com	Out of play	14 May 2025	
35	DF	(Spain)	Gerard Martín	Finger dislocated – right hand		FCB.com	vs Slovakia U21 with Spain U21	11 June 2025	

- Player is injured
- Player has recovered from injury
Last updated: 13 June 2025
Source: FC Barcelona

== Milestones ==
=== Debuts ===
The following players made their competitive debuts for the first team during the campaign.

Legend

– Indicates youth academy debut.

Date	No.	Pos.	Nat.	Name	Age	Final score	Opponent	Competition	Source
17 August 2024	28	MF	(Spain)	Marc Bernal	17	1–2 (A)	Valencia	La Liga	
17 August 2024	35	DF	(Spain)	Gerard Martín	22	1–2 (A)	Valencia	La Liga	
17 August 2024	18	FW	(Spain)	Pau Víctor	22	1–2 (A)	Valencia	La Liga	
27 August 2024	20	MF	(Spain)	Dani Olmo (Note: In this debut, Olmo scored his first goal with the first team.)	26	1–2 (A)	Rayo Vallecano	La Liga	
31 August 2024	36	DF	(Spain)	Sergi Domínguez	19	7–0 (H)	Valladolid	La Liga	
1 October 2024	39	DF	(Spain)	Andrés Cuenca	17	5–0 (H)	(Switzerland) Young Boys	Champions League	
4 January 2025	42	FW	(Spain)	Toni Fernández	16	0–4 (A)	Barbastro	Copa del Rey	
4 January 2025	25	GK	(Poland)	Wojciech Szczęsny	34	0–4 (A)	Barbastro	Copa del Rey	
3 May 2025	46	FW	(Spain)	Dani Rodríguez	19	1–2 (A)	Valladolid	La Liga	

(H) – Home; (A) – Away

=== Appearances ===
The following players made their 100th, 150th, 200th or 250th for Barcelona's first team during the campaign.

Date	No.	Pos.	Nat.	Name	Age	Final score	Opponent	Competition	Source
100th appearances
15 September 2024	9	FW	(Poland)	Robert Lewandowski	36	1–4 (A)	Girona	La Liga	
20 October 2024	23	DF	(France)	Jules Koundé	25	5–1 (H)	Sevilla	La Liga	
23 October 2024	11	FW	(Brazil)	Raphinha	27	4–1 (H)	(Germany) Bayern Munich	Champions League	
15 December 2024	3	DF	(Spain)	Alejandro Balde	21	0–1 (H)	Leganés	La Liga	
30 March 2025	24	DF	(Spain)	Eric García	24	4–1 (H)	Girona	La Liga	
30 April 2025	19	FW	(Spain)	Lamine Yamal	17	3–3 (H)	(Italy) Inter Milan	Champions League	
150th appearances
22 September 2024	8	MF	(Spain)	Pedri	21	1–5 (A)	Villarreal	La Liga	
9 April 2025	7	FW	(Spain)	Ferran Torres	25	4–0 (H)	(Germany) Borussia Dortmund	UEFA Champions League	
11 May 2025	6	MF	(Spain)	Gavi	20	4–3 (H)	Real Madrid	La Liga	
200th appearances
15 May 2025	8	MF	(Spain)	Pedri	22	0–2 (A)	Espanyol	La Liga	
250th appearances
19 April 2025	21	MF	(Netherlands)	Frenkie de Jong	27	4–3 (H)	Celta Vigo	La Liga	

(H) – Home; (A) – Away

=== First goals ===
The following players scored their first goals for Barcelona's first team during the campaign.

Date	No.	Pos.	Nat.	Name	Age	Score	Final score	Opponent	Competition	Source
27 August 2024	20	MF	(Spain)	Dani Olmo	26	1–2 (A)	1–2 (A)	Rayo Vallecano	La Liga	
28 September 2024	18	FW	(Spain)	Pau Víctor	22	2–1 (A)	4–2 (A)	Osasuna	La Liga	
1 October 2024	5	DF	(Spain)	Iñigo Martínez	33	3–0 (H)	5–0 (H)	(Switzerland) Young Boys	Champions League	
25 February 2025	2	DF	(Spain)	Pau Cubarsí	18	2–2 (H)	4–4 (H)	Atlético Madrid	Copa del Rey	
2 March 2025	35	DF	(Spain)	Gerard Martín	23	1-0 (H)	4-0 (H)	Real Sociedad	La Liga	
2 March 2025	17	MF	(Spain)	Marc Casadó	21	2-0 (H)	4-0 (H)	Real Sociedad	La Liga	

(H) – Home; (A) – Away

=== Goals ===
The following players made their 50th or 100th competitive goals for Barcelona's first team during the campaign.

Date	No.	Pos.	Nat.	Name	Age	Apps to milestone	Score	Final score	Opponent	Competition	Source
50th goal
19 April 2025	11	FW	(Brazil)	Raphinha	28	135	4–3 (H)	4–3 (H)	Celta Vigo	La Liga	
100th goal
25 May 2025	9	FW	(Poland)	Robert Lewandowski	35	147	0–1 (A)	0–3 (A)	Athletic Bilbao	La Liga	

(H) – Home; (A) – Away

=== First starts as captain ===
The following players made their first starts as captain of Barcelona's first team during the campaign.

Date	No.	Pos.	Nat.	Name	Age	Final score	Opponent	Competition	Source
25 September 2024	11	FW	(Brazil)	Raphinha	27	1–0 (H)	Getafe	La Liga	
28 September 2024	8	MF	(Spain)	Pedri	21	4–2 (A)	Osasuna	La Liga	

(H) – Home; (A) – Away

== Awards ==
=== Monthly awards ===
Player	Position	Award	Ref.
August
(Germany) Hansi Flick	Manager	La Liga Manager of the Month	
(Spain) Lamine Yamal	Forward	U23 La Liga Player of the Month	
(Brazil) Raphinha	Forward	La Liga Player of the Month	
September
(Spain) Lamine Yamal	Forward	La Liga Player of the Month	
October
(Germany) Hansi Flick	Manager	La Liga Manager of the Month	
(Spain) Pedri	Midfielder	U23 La Liga Player of the Month	
(Poland) Robert Lewandowski	Forward	La Liga Player of the Month	
February
(Germany) Hansi Flick	Manager	La Liga Manager of the Month	
(Spain) Lamine Yamal	Forward	U23 La Liga Player of the Month	
March
FC Barcelona		IFFHS Men's Club of the Month	
April
(Spain) Pedri	Midfielder	La Liga Player of the Month	
(Spain) Lamine Yamal	Forward	IFFHS Men's Player of the Month	
FC Barcelona		IFFHS Men's Club of the Month	

=== Annual awards ===
Player	Position	Award	Ref.
(Spain) Lamine Yamal	Forward	Premi Barça Jugadors 2023–24	
(Spain) Lamine Yamal	Forward	Kopa Trophy	
(Spain) Lamine Yamal	Forward	Golden Boy	
(Spain) Lamine Yamal	Forward	FIFA Men's World 11	
(Spain) Lamine Yamal	Forward	IFFHS Men's World Best Youth Player	
(Spain) Lamine Yamal	Forward	IFFHS Men's World Team	
(Spain) Lamine Yamal	Forward	Globe Soccer Awards – Emerging Player	
(Spain) Pau Cubarsí	Defender	IFFHS Men's Youth World Team	
(Spain) Lamine Yamal	Forward	IFFHS Men's Youth World Team	
(Spain) Lamine Yamal	Forward	IFFHS Men's UEFA Team	
(Brazil) Raphinha	Forward	IFFHS Men's CONMEBOL Team	
(Spain) Lamine Yamal	Forward	Memorial Aldo Rovira Award 2023–24	
(Spain) Pau Cubarsí	Defender	IFFHS Men's (U20) UEFA Team	
(Spain) Lamine Yamal	Forward	IFFHS Men's (U20) UEFA Team	
(Brazil) Vitor Roque	Forward	IFFHS Men's (U20) CONMEBOL Team	
(Spain) Lamine Yamal	Forward	Laureus World Sports Award for Breakthrough of the Year	
(Spain) Iñigo Martínez	Defender	La Liga Team of the Season	
(Spain) Pau Cubarsí	Defender	La Liga Team of the Season	
(France) Jules Koundé	Defender	La Liga Team of the Season	
(Spain) Pedri	Midfielder	La Liga Team of the Season	
(Brazil) Raphinha	Forward	La Liga Team of the Season	
(Spain) Lamine Yamal	Forward	La Liga Team of the Season	
(Poland) Robert Lewandowski	Forward	La Liga Team of the Season	
(Germany) Hansi Flick	Manager	La Liga Coach of the Season	
(Spain) Lamine Yamal	Forward	La Liga U23 Player of the Season	
(Brazil) Raphinha	Forward	La Liga Player of the Season	
