= 2025 Copa del Rey final =

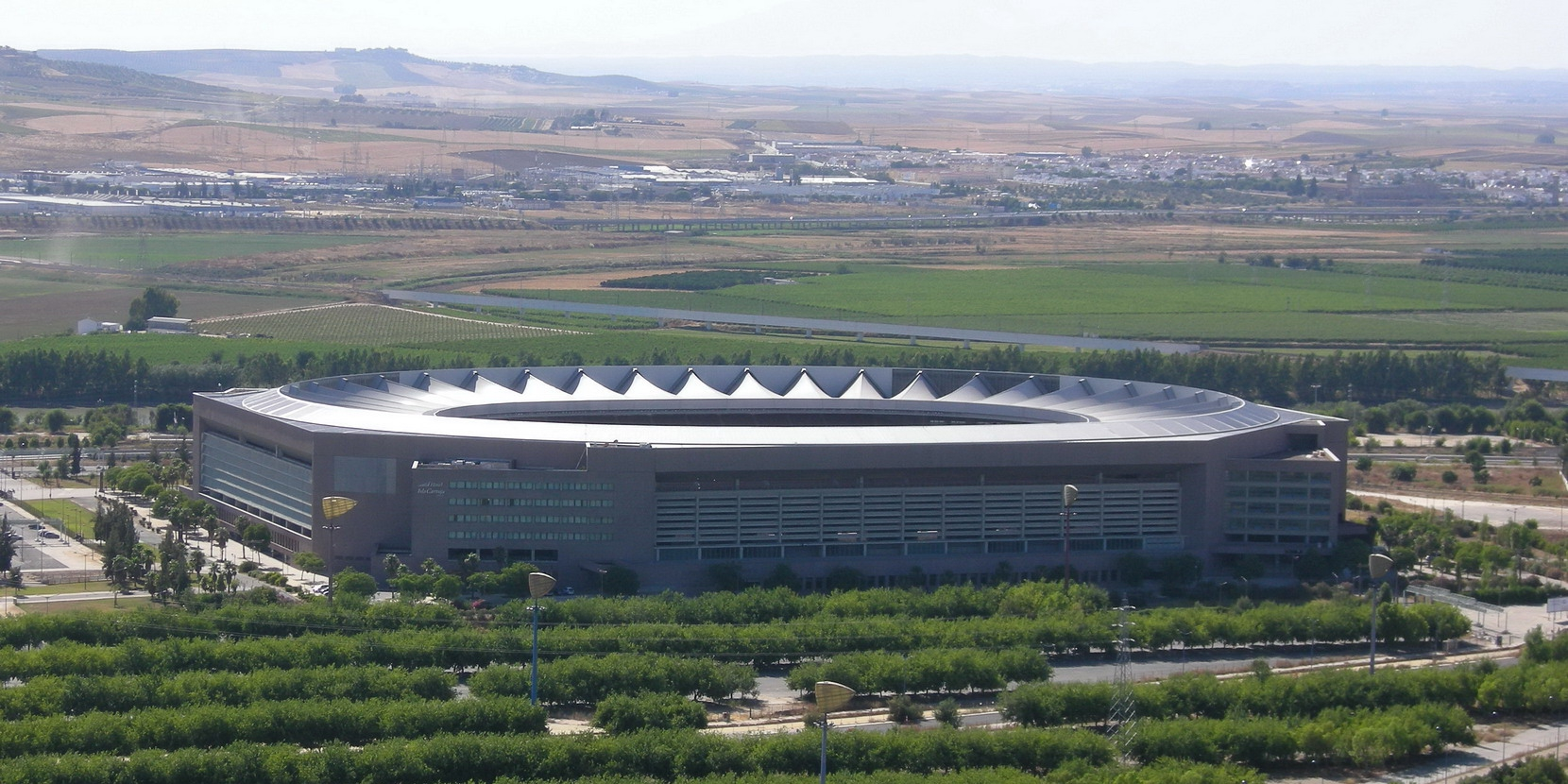
- Estadio de La Cartuja in Seville hosted the final.
- Event: 2024–25 Copa del Rey
Barcelona	Real Madrid
3	2
- After extra time
- Date: 26 April 2025
- Venue: La Cartuja, Seville
- Man of the Match: Ferran Torres (Barcelona)
- Referee: Ricardo de Burgos Bengoetxea
- Attendance: 55,579

The 2025 Copa del Rey final was a football match to decide the winners of the 2024–25 Copa del Rey, the 123rd edition of Spain's primary football cup (including two seasons where two rival editions were played). The match was played on 26 April 2025 at Estadio de La Cartuja in Seville – in the first event at the venue following its expansion and conversion from an athletics facility ahead of its use at the 2030 FIFA World Cup – between arch rivals Barcelona and Real Madrid. It was the 260th competitive match between the sides and the first in a Copa del Rey final since 2014.

Barcelona won the match 3–2 after extra time for a record-extending 32nd Copa del Rey title.

== Route to the final ==
Barcelona		Round	Real Madrid
Opponent	Result		Opponent	Result
Barbastro	4–0 (A)	Round of 32	Minera	5–0 (A) (Note: Minera did not play the match in their main stadium Ángel Celdrán, Llano del Beal, as it did not meet the broadcasting requirements.)
Real Betis	5–1 (H)	Round of 16	Celta Vigo	5–2 (a.e.t.) (H)
Valencia	5–0 (A)	Quarter-finals	Leganés	3–2 (A)
Atlético Madrid	4–4 (H), 1–0 (A)	Semi-finals	Real Sociedad	1–0 (A), 4–4 (a.e.t.) (H)

Key: (H) = Home; (A) = Away

== Refereeing controversy ==
Ahead of the final, Real Madrid TV broadcast a video criticising the appointed match referee Ricardo de Burgos Bengoetxea, stating that Barcelona won more often than Real Madrid in matches he refereed. RMTV disparaged De Burgos Bengoetxea for never being appointed to matches in the UEFA Champions League or FIFA tournaments, and included footage of several alleged refereeing errors against Real Madrid.

De Burgos Bengoetxea responded at a press conference by highlighting difficulties faced by match officials and their families when their integrity is questioned, saying "When your child goes to school and is told their father is a thief by other kids, that's really tough". The final's video assistant referee Pablo González Fuertes suggested that Spanish match officials may take action such as a strike due to the way they were being treated.

Real Madrid branded the officials' comments 'unacceptable' and withdrew from pre-final media duties, including the press conference and official training session.

== Match ==
=== Details ===
26 April 2025
22:00 CEST

Barcelona	3–2 (a.e.t.)	Real Madrid
Pedri 28'; Torres 84'; Koundé 116'	Report	Mbappé 70'; Tchouaméni 77'

La Cartuja, Seville
Attendance: 55,579
Referee: Ricardo de Burgos Bengoetxea

Barcelona	Real Madrid

GK	25	(Poland) Wojciech Szczęsny
RB	23	(France) Jules Koundé
CB	2	(Spain) Pau Cubarsí
CB	5	(Spain) Iñigo Martínez
LB	35	(Spain) Gerard Martín	(yellow card) 37'	(substituted off) 85'
CM	21	(Netherlands) Frenkie de Jong (c)	(yellow card) 68'	(substituted off) 85'
CM	8	(Spain) Pedri		(substituted off) 98'
RM	19	(Spain) Lamine Yamal
AM	20	(Spain) Dani Olmo		(substituted off) 65'
LM	11	(Brazil) Raphinha	(yellow card) 90+10'
CF	7	(Spain) Ferran Torres		(substituted off) 115'
Substitutes:
GK	1	(Germany) Marc-André ter Stegen
GK	13	(Spain) Iñaki Peña
DF	4	(Uruguay) Ronald Araújo		(substituted on) 85'
DF	15	(Denmark) Andreas Christensen
DF	24	(Spain) Eric García		(substituted on) 98'
DF	32	(Spain) Héctor Fort
MF	6	(Spain) Gavi		(substituted on) 85'
MF	14	(Spain) Pablo Torre
MF	16	(Spain) Fermín López	(yellow card) 90+4'	(substituted on) 65'
FW	10	(Spain) Ansu Fati
FW	18	(Spain) Pau Víctor		(substituted on) 115'
Manager:
(Germany) Hansi Flick

GK	1	(Belgium) Thibaut Courtois
RB	17	(Spain) Lucas Vázquez (c)	(red card) 120+3'	(substituted off) 55'
CB	35	(Spain) Raúl Asencio
CB	22	(Germany) Antonio Rüdiger	(red card) 120+3'	(substituted off) 111'
LB	23	(France) Ferland Mendy		(substituted off) 11'
CM	8	(Uruguay) Federico Valverde
CM	14	(France) Aurélien Tchouaméni	(yellow card) 31'
RW	11	(Brazil) Rodrygo		(substituted off) 46'
AM	5	(England) Jude Bellingham	(yellow card) 107' (red card) 120+4'
LW	19	(Spain) Dani Ceballos		(substituted off) 55'
CF	7	(Brazil) Vinícius Júnior		(substituted off) 89'
Substitutes:
GK	13	(Ukraine) Andriy Lunin
GK	26	(Spain) Fran González
DF	4	(Austria) David Alaba
DF	18	(Spain) Jesús Vallejo
DF	20	(Spain) Fran García		(substituted on) 11'
MF	10	(Croatia) Luka Modrić	(yellow card) 90+1'	(substituted on) 55'
MF	15	(Turkey) Arda Güler		(substituted on) 55'
CF	9	(France) Kylian Mbappé		(substituted on) 46'
FW	16	(Brazil) Endrick		(substituted on) 111'
FW	21	(Morocco) Brahim Díaz		(substituted on) 89'
Manager:
(Italy) Carlo Ancelotti

Man of the Match:
Ferran Torres (Barcelona)

Assistant referees:
Iker de Francisco Grijalba
Asier Pérez de Mendiola González de Durana
Fourth official:
Mateo Busquets Ferrer
Reserve assistant referee:
Alfredo Rodríguez Moreno
Video assistant referee:
Pablo González Fuertes
Assistant video assistant referees:
Íñigo Prieto López de Ceraín
Francisco José Hernández Maeso

Match rules

- 90 minutes.
- 30 minutes of extra time if necessary.
- Penalty shoot-out if scores still level.
- Eleven named substitutes.
- Maximum of five substitutions, with a sixth allowed in extra time. (Note: Each team was given only three opportunities to make substitutions, with a fourth opportunity in extra time, excluding substitutions made at half-time, before the start of extra time and at half-time in extra time.)

== Aftermath ==
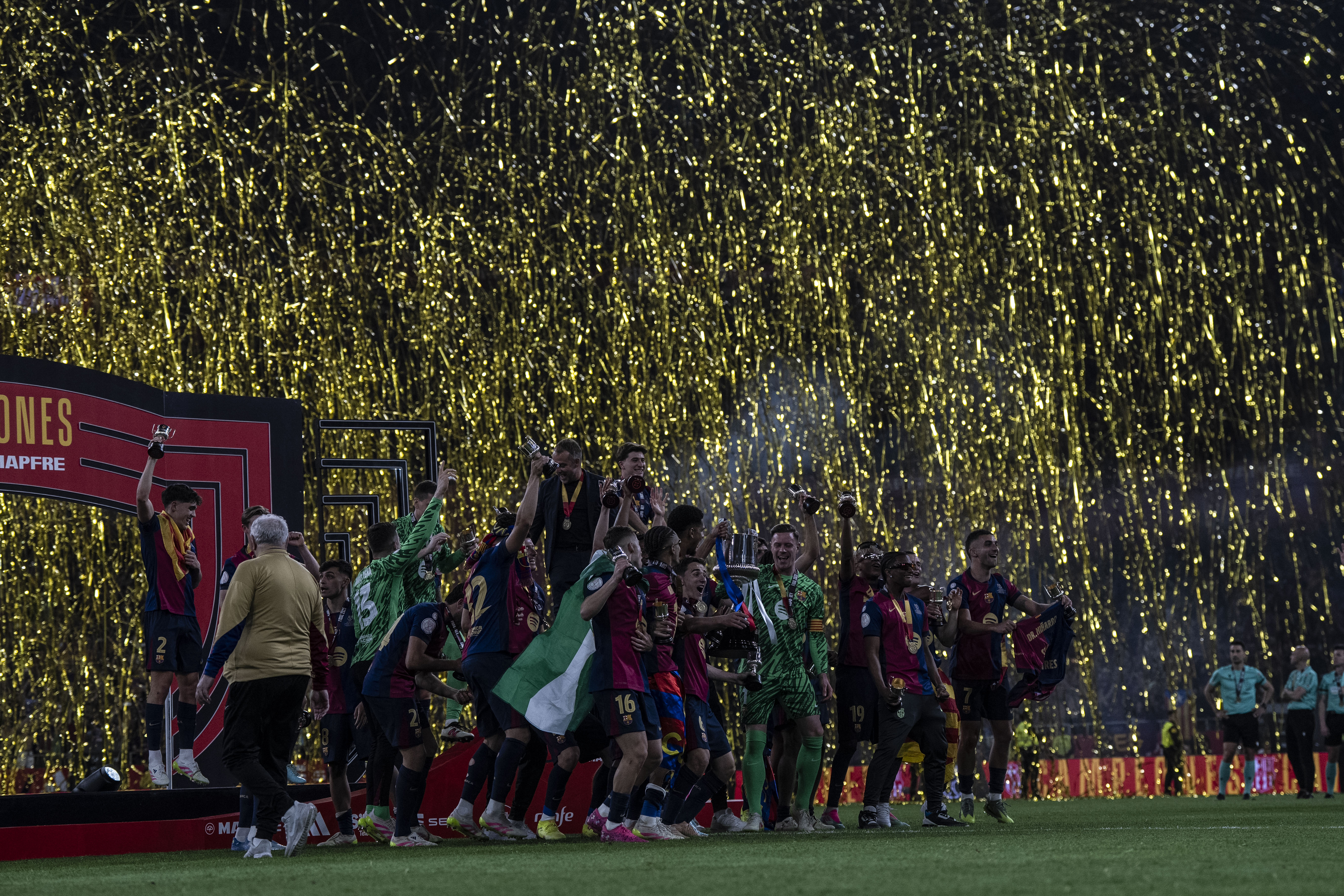
Barcelona lifting the trophy after winning the final against Real Madrid.

The match official Ricardo de Burgos Bengoetxea issued three red cards — all to Real Madrid players. Antonio Rüdiger, who had already been substituted, was shown a red card during the stoppage time of extra time for throwing an object toward the referee from the technical area. Lucas Vázquez was sent off for entering the pitch to protest a refereeing decision aggressively. After the final whistle, Jude Bellingham was also dismissed for confronting the referee in an aggressive manner and had to be restrained by teammates.

After being sent off, Rüdiger publicly apologized for his behaviour, admitting there was no excuse for his actions and expressed regret for disappointing the fans. However, Rüdiger could be suspended for four to twelve matches, or up to three to six months if the offense is classified as more serious. Meanwhile, both Vázquez and Bellingham would receive two-match suspensions, which will be served in the next season's Copa del Rey. Ultimately, Rüdiger was handed a six-match ban across domestic competitions, while Bellingham's red card was rescinded and Vázquez received a two-match Copa del Rey suspension.
