= Marc Casadó =

Spanish footballer (born 2003)

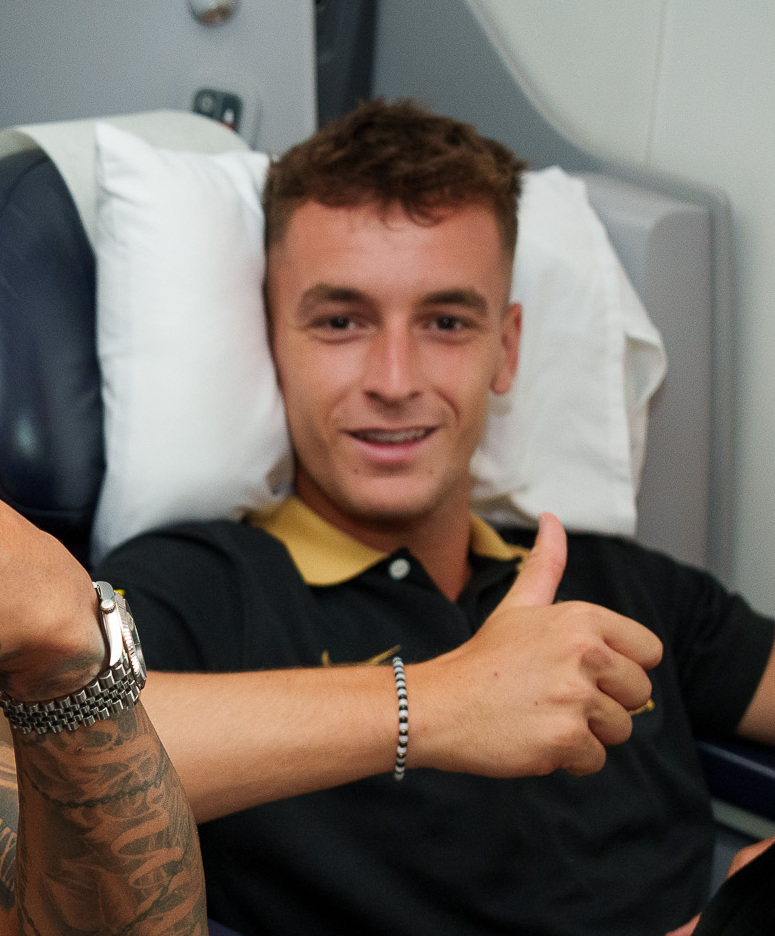
- Casadó with Barcelona in 2024

Personal information
- Full name: Marc Casadó Torras
- Date of birth: 14 September 2003 (age 23)
- Place of birth: Sant Pere de Vilamajor, Spain
- Height: 1.71 m (5 ft 7 in)
- Position: Defensive midfielder

Team information
- Current team: Deportivo A Coruña (on loan from Barcelona)
- Number: 6

Youth career
- 2009–2011: Vilamajor
- 2011–2012: Sant Celoni
- 2012–2015: Granollers
- 2015–2016: Damm
- 2016–2022: Barcelona

Senior career*
Years	Team	Apps	(Gls)
2022–2024	Barcelona B	61	(0)
2022–	Barcelona	49	(1)
2026–	→ Deportivo A Coruña (loan)	5	(0)

International career^{‡}
2019–2020	Spain U16	5	(0)
2019–2020	Spain U17	8	(1)
2024–	Spain U21	1	(0)
2024–	Spain	2	(0)
- * Club domestic league appearances and goals as of 18:34, 21 November 2026 (UTC) ‡ National team caps and goals as of 22:38, 18 November 2024 (UTC)

Marc Casadó Torras (born 14 September 2003) is a Spanish professional footballer who plays as a defensive midfielder for La Liga club Deportivo A Coruña, on loan from Barcelona, and the Spain national team.

== Club career ==
=== Barcelona ===
Born in Sant Pere de Vilamajor, Barcelona, Catalonia, Casadó is a youth product of Vilamajor, Sant Celoni, Granollers and Damm. He moved to Barcelona's youth academy at the age of 13 in 2016. He was the captain of the Juvenil A team, which he helped win the league and Copa de Campeones in the 2020–21 season. Furthermore, he was on the bench for the reserve squad five times in 2021, and was promoted to the squad in the summer of 2022. On 5 July 2022, he extended his contract with the club until the summer of 2028.

He made his senior debut with Barcelona Atlètic in a 3–2 Primera Federación win over Castellón on 27 August 2022. On 1 November 2022, Casadó made his official debut for the senior squad against Viktoria Plzeň in the Champions League. In the 67th minute, Franck Kessié got injured and Casadó replaced him till the final whistle.

In the 2023–24 season, Casadó was named captain of the Barcelona Atlètic team. He trained with the senior squad while playing games for Barcelona Atlètic. On 17 March 2024, he made his first La Liga appearance against Atlético Madrid, where he got subbed on for Héctor Fort. On 2 March 2025, Casadó netted his first goal for Barcelona in a 4–0 victory against Real Sociedad at Estadi Olímpic Lluís Companys.

In the 2024–25 season, Casadó won a domestic treble (La Liga, Copa del Rey and Supercopa de España) with Barcelona.

==== Loan to Deportivo A Coruña ====
On 1 September 2026, Casadó was loaned to Deportivo A Coruña also in the first division, for one year.

== International career ==
=== Youth ===
Casadó is a youth international for Spain, having been called up to the Spain U16s and U17s in 2019. In October 2024, he was called up to the Spain U21s.

=== Senior ===
Casadó was named in the 26-man final squad by coach Luis De La Fuente for the UEFA Nations League matches against Denmark and Switzerland on 15 and 18 November 2024, respectively. He made his debut against Denmark, substituting Martín Zubimendi in the 70th minute, as Spain won 2–1.

== Style of play ==
Casadó is a defensive midfielder primarily, but has also played as right-back and centre-back. He is known for his work rate, passing, defending and technical proficiency.

== Career statistics ==
=== Club ===
As of match played 21 November 2026

Appearances and goals by club, season and competition
Club	Season	League			Copa del Rey		Europe		Other		Total	
Club	Season	Division	Apps	Goals	Apps	Goals	Apps	Goals	Apps	Goals	Apps	Goals
Barcelona Atlètic	2022–23	Primera Federación	34	0	—		—		2 (Note: Appearances in Primera Federación play-offs)	0	36	0
Barcelona Atlètic	2023–24	Primera Federación	27	0	—		—		4	0	31	0
Barcelona Atlètic	Total		61	0	—		—		6	0	67	0
Barcelona	2022–23	La Liga	0	0	0	0	1 (Note: Appearance(s) in UEFA Champions League)	0	0	0	1	0
Barcelona	2023–24	La Liga	2	0	0	0	2	0	0	0	4	0
Barcelona	2024–25	La Liga	23	1	1	0	10	0	2 (Note: Appearances in Supercopa de España)	0	36	1
Barcelona	2025–26	La Liga	24	0	4	0	6	0	0	0	34	0
Barcelona	Total		49	1	5	0	19	0	2	0	75	1
Deportivo A Coruña (loan)	2026–27	La Liga	5	0	0	0	—		—		5	0
Career total			115	1	5	0	19	0	8	0	147	1

=== International ===
As of match played 18 November 2024

Appearances and goals by national team and year
National team	Year	Apps	Goals
Spain	2024	2	0
Total		2	0

== Honours ==
Barcelona

- La Liga: 2024–25, 2025–26
- Copa del Rey: 2024–25
- Supercopa de España: 2025, 2026
