= Dani Rodríguez =

Dani Rodríguez is the name of:

- Dani Rodríguez (footballer, born 1988), Spanish footballer
- Dani Rodríguez (footballer, born 2005), Spanish footballer
