= Pablo Torre (footballer) =

Spanish footballer (born 2003)

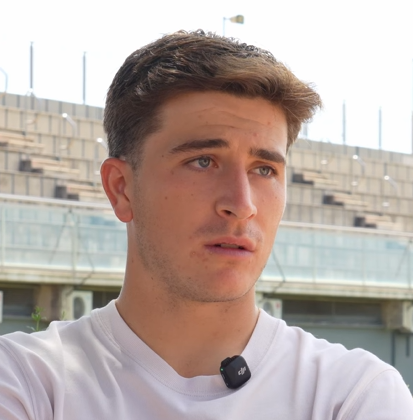
- Torre in 2026

Personal information
- Full name: Pablo Torre Carral
- Date of birth: 3 April 2003 (age 23)
- Place of birth: Soto de la Marina, Spain
- Height: 1.73 m (5 ft 8 in)
- Position: Attacking midfielder

Team information
- Current team: Mallorca
- Number: 20

Youth career
- 2012–2015: Marina Sport
- 2015–2020: Racing Santander

Senior career*
Years	Team	Apps	(Gls)
2020–2021	Racing B	0	(0)
2020–2022	Racing Santander	55	(14)
2022–2023	Barcelona B	3	(0)
2022–2025	Barcelona	18	(3)
2023–2024	→ Girona (loan)	26	(0)
2025–	Mallorca	45	(6)

International career^{‡}
2020	Spain U17	1	(0)
2021–2022	Spain U19	8	(3)
2022–	Spain U21	21	(2)
- * Club domestic league appearances and goals as of 18:13, 24 October 2026 (UTC) ‡ National team caps and goals as of 23:54, 21 June 2025 (UTC)

Pablo Torre Carral (born 3 April 2003) is a Spanish professional footballer who plays as an attacking midfielder for La Liga club Mallorca.

== Club career ==
=== Racing Santander ===
Born in Soto de la Marina, Cantabria, Torre joined Racing de Santander's youth setup in 2015, from CD Marina Sport. On 15 April 2020, while still a youth, he signed a professional contract with the club, until June 2025.

Torre made his senior debut with the reserves on 19 July 2020, starting in a 1–1 away draw against Gimnástica de Torrelavega, for the year's Tercera División promotion play-offs. In August, aged only 17, he was a part of the first team squad in the pre-season under manager Javi Rozada, and was definitely promoted to the main squad in September.

Torre made his first team debut for Racing on 18 October 2020, starting in the opening match of the 2020–21 Segunda División B, a 1–1 home draw against Club Portugalete. He scored his first senior goal the following 21 February, netting his team's second in a 3–1 home win over CD Laredo; six days later, he scored a brace in a 4–0 away routing of Barakaldo CF.

A regular starter during his first full season as a senior, Torre was assigned the number 10 jersey ahead of the 2021–22 campaign, in the new third tier called Primera División RFEF. He contributed with ten goals in 32 matches (play-offs included) as Racing achieved promotion to Segunda División.

=== Barcelona ===
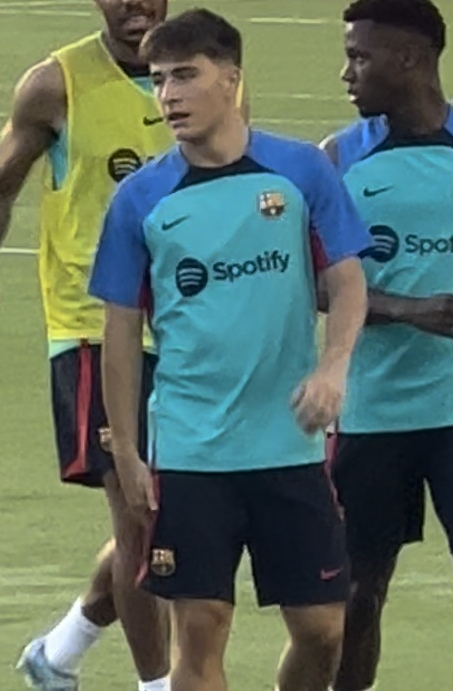
Torre training with Barcelona in 2022

On 4 March 2022, La Liga club Barcelona reached an agreement with Racing for the transfer of Torre for a fee of €5 million plus variables, and he was initially assigned to the B team for the 2022–23 season. He signed a contract until June 2026 on 15 June.

On 7 September 2022, Torre played his first Champions League match, coming on for Franck Kessié in the 81st minute, in a 5–1 win over Viktoria Plzeň in the first match of the 2022–23 season. On 23 October, Torre played his first La Liga game for Barcelona at Camp Nou, coming on for Ousmane Dembélé in the 77th minute against Athletic Bilbao. On 1 November, he scored his first Champions League goal in a 4–2 away win over Viktoria Plzeň in the second leg of the same season.

==== Loan to Girona ====
On 18 July 2023, Torre was loaned to fellow top tier side Girona for the 2023–24 season. On 12 August 2023, he made his debut for the club in a league match against Real Sociedad.

==== Return to Barcelona ====
Torre returned to Barcelona for the 2024–25 season. He made an immediate impact under new head coach Hansi Flick, scoring in a 5–1 win over Villarreal on 22 September 2024 and netting a brace in a 5–1 victory against Sevilla on 20 October 2024.

Torre also scored one goal and provided two assists in the Copa del Rey R32 match against Barbastro on 4 January 2025. This remarkable tally brings his season total to four goals and three assists, which translates to a goal contribution per 50 minutes in just 348 minutes of playing time for the season.

=== Mallorca ===
On 14 July 2025, Torre signed a four-year contract with fellow top tier side RCD Mallorca, for a rumoured fee of €5 million. He made his debut for the club on 16 August, against his former club Barcelona in a 0–3 home defeat.

== Personal life ==
Torre's father Esteban was also a footballer and a midfielder. He represented Racing for the most of his career.

== Career statistics ==
=== Club ===
As of match played 24 October 2026

Appearances and goals by club, season and competition
Club	Season	League			Copa del Rey		Europe		Other		Total	
Club	Season	Division	Apps	Goals	Apps	Goals	Apps	Goals	Apps	Goals	Apps	Goals
Rayo Cantabria	2019–20	Tercera División	0	0	—		—		1 (Note: Appearance in Tercera División play-offs)	0	1	0
Racing Santander	2020–21	Segunda División B	24	4	1	0	—		—		25	4
Racing Santander	2021–22	Primera División RFEF	31	10	—		—		3 (Note: Two appearances in Copa Federación, one appearance in Primera División RFEF final)	0	34	10
Racing Santander	Total		55	14	1	0	—		3	0	59	14
Barcelona Atlétic	2022–23	Primera Federación	3	0	—		—		—		3	0
Barcelona	2022–23	La Liga	8	0	2	0	3 (Note: Appearances in UEFA Champions League)	1	0	0	13	1
Barcelona	2024–25	La Liga	10	3	2	1	2	0	0	0	14	4
Barcelona	Total		18	3	4	1	5	1	0	0	27	5
Girona (loan)	2023–24	La Liga	26	0	3	1	—		—		29	1
Mallorca	2025–26	La Liga	34	4	3	0	—		—		37	4
Mallorca	2026–27	Segunda División	11	2	0	0	—		—		11	2
Mallorca	Total		45	6	3	0	—		—		48	6
Career total			147	23	11	2	5	1	4	0	166	26

== Honours ==
Racing Santander

- Primera División RFEF: 2021–22

Barcelona

- La Liga: 2022–23, 2024–25
- Copa del Rey: 2024–25
- Supercopa de España: 2023, 2025
