= Esteban Torre =

Spanish footballer and manager

Personal information
- Full name: Esteban Torre Ontañón
- Date of birth: 3 September 1971 (age 55)
- Place of birth: Soto de la Marina, Spain
- Height: 1.75 m (5 ft 9 in)
- Position: Midfielder

Youth career
- Marina Sport
- 1985–1989: Racing Santander

Senior career*
Years	Team	Apps	(Gls)
1989–1991	Racing B		
1989–2000	Racing Santander	144	(11)
1997–1998	→ Logroñés (loan)	26	(0)
1999–2000	→ Toledo (loan)	43	(3)
2000–2001	Universidad LP	9	(0)
Total		222	(14)

International career
1987–1988	Spain U16	6	(1)
1988–1990	Spain U18	13	(2)
1992	Spain U21	1	(0)

Managerial career
- 2001: Racing Santander (assistant)
- 2008–2011: Bezana
- 2015–2016: Racing B
- * Club domestic league appearances and goals

Esteban Torre Ontañón (born 3 September 1971) is a Spanish football manager and former player who played as a midfielder.

== Playing career ==
Born in Soto de la Marina, Cantabria, Torre joined Racing de Santander's youth setup at the age of 13, from CD Marina Sport. He made his first team debut at the age of just 18 on 9 December 1989, playing the last 17 minutes in a 3–0 Segunda División away loss against Levante UD.

Torre featured rarely during his first two seasons with the first team, as the club suffered relegation in the first but achieved immediate promotion back in the second. In the 1991–92 campaign, he established himself as a regular starter and scored his first professional goal on 24 November 1991, in a 1–1 home draw against RC Celta de Vigo.

Torre was rarely used during Racing's promotion campaign to La Liga in 1992–93, only contributing with one goal in ten matches. He only regained his starting spot in 1994–95, with the club still in the top tier; in that season, he also scored a career-best five goals.

After again falling down the pecking order, Torre was loaned to CD Logroñés in the second level for the 1997–98 campaign. Another loan to fellow league team CD Toledo followed in January 1999, and he remained at the latter club for 18 months before permanently leaving Racing for Universidad de Las Palmas CF also in the second tier in 2000; he retired with the side in January 2001, aged just 29, after featuring rarely.

== Coaching career ==
After retiring, Torre returned to Racing as an assistant of Quique Setién in 2001 before being named goalkeeping coach of the side in October of that year. He continued to work in that role for several years with Setién at Polideportivo Ejido, the Equatorial Guinea national team, and Logroñés.

In 2008, Torre was named manager of Tercera División side CD Bezana. He left the club on 28 May 2011, and returned to Racing in July 2015, after being appointed in charge of the reserves also in the fourth division.

On 4 May 2016, after having disagreements with Racing's first team manager Pedro Munitis over the course of the season, Torre left the B-side.

== Personal life ==
Torre's son Pablo is also a footballer and a midfielder. He too was a Racing youth graduate.
