= Gerard Martín (footballer) =

Spanish footballer (born 2002)

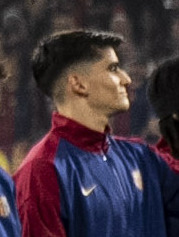
- Martín with Barcelona in 2025

Personal information
- Full name: Gerard Martín Langreo
- Date of birth: 26 February 2002 (age 24)
- Place of birth: Barcelona, Spain
- Height: 1.86 m (6 ft 1 in)
- Position: Defender

Team information
- Current team: Barcelona
- Number: 18

Youth career
- EF Performance
- Sant Gabriel
- 2018–2021: Cornellà

Senior career*
Years	Team	Apps	(Gls)
2021–2023	Cornellà	57	(0)
2023–2024	Barcelona B	37	(0)
2024–	Barcelona	72	(2)

International career
2025	Spain U21	3	(0)
- * Club domestic league appearances and goals as of 19:45, 22 November 2026 (UTC)

Gerard Martín Langreo (born 26 February 2002) is a Spanish professional footballer who plays as a defender for La Liga club Barcelona. Primarily a centre-back, he is also capable of playing as a left-back.

== Early life ==
Born in Barcelona, Catalonia, Martín moved with his family to Sant Andreu de la Barca at the age of five.

== Club career ==
On 19 July 2023, Martín signed a two-year contract with Barcelona B, arriving from Cornellà. At the former side, he was viewed as "one of the key defensive players" under former club player Rafael Márquez. On 17 August 2024, he made his La Liga debut with their first team, coming on as a 63rd-minute substitute for Alejandro Balde in a 2–1 away win against Valencia.

Martín scored his first professional goal on 2 March 2025, from a cross by Dani Olmo in a 4–0 victory over Real Sociedad at the Estadi Olímpic Lluís Companys. He contributed 28 league appearances for the eventual champions, making 42 in all competitions with 19 starts.

In the 2025–26 season, still under Hansi Flick, Martín was often deployed as a left-sided centre-back. He stated in an interview that he felt comfortable both as a full-back and a stopper, highlighting his tactical versatility. He explained that his transition to the latter role began during preseason, where he continued training until he felt fully prepared; he added that adapting to different defensive responsibilities helped him to develop his confidence and understanding of the game, also describing playing at the Camp Nou in major European matches as highly motivating for his progression.

Martín played his 100th competitive match on 10 October 2026, in a 3–0 home defeat of Getafe.

== International career ==
Martín earned his first cap for the Spain under-21 side on 21 March 2025, in a 2–2 friendly draw against the Czech Republic in Lorca. He was selected by manager Santi Denia for the 2025 UEFA European Championship finals, but had to be removed from the squad after the first game due to a hand injury.

== Style of play ==
Martín has been described as a very reliable defender, excelling in marking and the aerial game.

== Career statistics ==
As of match played 22 November 2026

Appearances and goals by club, season and competition
Club	Season	League			Copa del Rey		Europe		Other		Total	
Club	Season	Division	Apps	Goals	Apps	Goals	Apps	Goals	Apps	Goals	Apps	Goals
Cornellà	2020–21	Segunda División B	5	0	1	0	—		—		6	0
Cornellà	2021–22	Primera División RFEF	16	0	1	0	—		—		17	0
Cornellà	2022–23	Primera Federación	36	0	0	0	—		—		36	0
Cornellà	Total		57	0	2	0	—		—		59	0
Barcelona B	2023–24	Primera Federación	37	0	—		—		4 (Note: Appearances in Primera Federación play-offs)	0	41	0
Barcelona	2024–25	La Liga	28	1	5	0	8 (Note: Appearances in UEFA Champions League)	0	1 (Note: Appearances in Supercopa de España)	0	42	1
Barcelona	2025–26	La Liga	32	0	5	0	12	0	2	0	51	0
Barcelona	2026–27	La Liga	12	1	0	0	3	0	0	0	15	1
Barcelona	Total		72	2	10	0	23	0	3	0	108	2
Career total			166	2	12	0	23	0	7	0	208	2

== Honours ==
Barcelona

- La Liga: 2024–25, 2025–26
- Copa del Rey: 2024–25
- Supercopa de España: 2025, 2026
