= Toni Fernández =

Spanish footballer (born 2008)

Personal information
- Full name: Antonio Fernández Casino
- Date of birth: 15 July 2008 (age 18)
- Place of birth: Rubí, Spain
- Height: 1.75 m (5 ft 9 in)
- Positions: Forward; winger

Team information
- Current team: Venezia (on loan from Barcelona)
- Number: 77

Youth career
- Juventud 25 de Septiembre
- Espanyol
- 2018–2024: Barcelona

Senior career*
Years	Team	Apps	(Gls)
2024–2026	Barcelona B	47	(13)
2025–	Barcelona	1	(0)
2026–	→ Venezia (loan)	1	(0)

International career^{‡}
2022–2023	Spain U15	7	(3)
2023–2024	Spain U16	1	(1)
2023–	Spain U17	6	(1)
2024–	Spain U18	3	(1)
- * Club domestic league appearances and goals as of 6 September 2026 ‡ National team caps and goals as of 03:30, 16 October 2024 (UTC)

Antonio "Toni" Fernández Casino (born 15 July 2008) is a Spanish professional footballer who plays as a forward or winger for Serie A club Venezia, on loan from La Liga club Barcelona.

== Club career ==
Born in Rubí, Barcelona, Catalonia, Fernández joined the youth academy of FC Barcelona. He was "considered one of the most promising talents at Barcelona" while playing for the club. In September and October 2024, Fernández was included in the senior team's squad for several La Liga and UEFA Champions League games, but remained on the bench in all of them. On 4 January 2025, Fernández made his senior debut for Barcelona in a 4–0 away win over Barbastro in the Copa del Rey, becoming the second youngest player to debut for the club at age 16 years and 173 days, only behind his teammate Lamine Yamal. On 4 August, during Barcelona’s pre-season tour, Fernández scored in a 5–0 away win against South Korean side Daegu FC. Later that year, on 18 October, he made his La Liga debut, starting in a 2–1 victory over Girona.

On 1 September 2026, Fernández moved to Italian newly promoted Serie A club Venezia on loan with an option to buy, subject to certain conditions.

== Style of play ==
Fernández is primarily a forward or winger, a left-footed attacker known for his speed, mobility, and technical skill. He exhibits versatility across the attacking line, able to play as a winger, centre-forward, and even a false nine.

== Personal life ==
Fernández's cousin is Guille Fernández; the pair's fathers are brothers and their mothers are sisters.

== Career statistics ==
As of match played 16 November 2025

Appearances and goals by club, season and competition
Club	Season	League			Copa del Rey		Europe		Other		Total	
Club	Season	Division	Apps	Goals	Apps	Goals	Apps	Goals	Apps	Goals	Apps	Goals
Barcelona B	2024–25	Primera Federación	23	8	—		—		—		23	8
Barcelona B	2025–26	Segunda Federación	5	2	—		—		—		5	2
Barcelona B	Total		28	10	—		—		—		28	10
Barcelona	2024–25	La Liga	0	0	1	0	0	0	0	0	1	0
Barcelona	2025–26	La Liga	1	0	0	0	0	0	0	0	1	0
Barcelona	Total		1	0	1	0	0	0	0	0	2	0
Career total			29	10	1	0	0	0	0	0	30	10

== Honours ==
Barcelona

- La Liga: 2025–26
- Copa del Rey: 2024–25
