= Guille Fernández (footballer, born 2008) =

Spanish footballer (born 2008)

Personal information
- Full name: Guillermo Fernández Casino
- Date of birth: 18 June 2008 (age 18)
- Place of birth: Rubí, Spain
- Height: 1.81 m (5 ft 11 in)
- Position: Midfielder

Team information
- Current team: Mallorca
- Number: 2

Youth career
- Espanyol
- 2018–2024: Barcelona

Senior career*
Years	Team	Apps	(Gls)
2024–2026	Barcelona B	61	(8)
2026–	Mallorca	5	(0)

International career^{‡}
2022–2023	Spain U15	11	(2)
2023–2024	Spain U17	12	(6)
2024–2025	Spain U19	10	(0)
2026	Spain U18	1	(0)
- * Club domestic league appearances and goals as of 24 October 2026 ‡ National team caps and goals as of 20:15, 31 March 2026 (UTC)

Guillermo Fernández Casino (born 18 June 2008) is a Spanish professional footballer who plays as a midfielder for RCD Mallorca.

== Club career ==
Born in Rubí, Barcelona, Catalonia, Fernández began his career at Espanyol, before making the switch to Barcelona in 2018. In March 2022, following impressive performances for the club's Infantil A squad, he was promoted to the Cadet B team - playing with players a year older than himself - and marked his second appearance with a goal. The following year, in August 2023, he was included in Barcelona's under-18 squad, despite only being fifteen, for their pre-season preparation. He was given his debut in the UEFA Youth League by youth team manager Óscar López in September, becoming Barcelona's second-youngest player in the competition, behind Lamine Yamal. Continuing his rise through the ranks, Fernández was included in the first-team squad's training for the first time in October 2023, alongside fellow youth players Pau Cubarsí, Marc Guiu and Áron Yaakobishvili, due to the absence of a number of first-team players. In September 2024, Fernández was included in the first team squad for several La Liga and UEFA Champions League matches, but remained on the bench in all of them.

On 1 September 2026, Fernández signed a five-year contract with Segunda División side RCD Mallorca.

== International career ==
Fernández has represented Spain at under-15 level.

== Personal life ==
Fernández's cousin is fellow Barcelona player Toni Fernández; the pair's fathers are brothers and their mothers are sisters.

== Career statistics ==
=== Club ===
As of match played 24 October 2026

Appearances and goals by club, season and competition
Club	Season	League			Cup		Europe		Other		Total	
Club	Season	Division	Apps	Goals	Apps	Goals	Apps	Goals	Apps	Goals	Apps	Goals
Barcelona B	2023–24	Primera Federación	7	0	—		—		1 (Note: Appearance in 2024 Primera Federación play-offs)	0	8	0
Barcelona B	2024–25	Primera Federación	32	7	—		—		—		32	7
Barcelona B	2025–26	Segunda Federación	22	1	—		—		—		22	1
Barcelona B	Total		61	8	0	0	0	0	1	0	62	8
Mallorca	2026–27	Segunda División	5	0	0	0	—		—		5	0
Career total			66	8	0	0	0	0	1	0	67	8
