= Landry Farré =

Spanish footballer (born 2007)

Personal information
- Full name: Landry Cephas Farré Miró
- Date of birth: 1 January 2007 (age 19)
- Place of birth: Abidjan, Ivory Coast
- Height: 1.79 m (5 ft 10 in)
- Position: Defender

Team information
- Current team: Barcelona B
- Number: 2

Youth career
- 2014–2025: Barcelona

Senior career*
Years	Team	Apps	(Gls)
2024–	Barcelona B	24	(0)

International career^{‡}
2022	Spain U16	1	(0)
2023−2024	Spain U17	11	(0)
2024–	Spain U18	3	(0)
- * Club domestic league appearances and goals as of 22:08, 30 November 2025 (UTC) ‡ National team caps and goals as of 27 February 2025

Landry Cephas Farré Miró (born 1 January 2007) is a professional footballer who plays as a defender for Segunda Federación club Barcelona Atlètic. Born in Ivory Coast, he represents Spain internationally at youth level.

== Early life ==
Farré was born in Abidjan, Ivory Coast, but was adopted by a Spanish family and grew up in Barcelona, Spain.

== Club career ==
Farré joined the youth academy of FC Barcelona at the age of five. He helped the club win several national and international competitions including La Liga Promises, MIC and the Danone Cup. He has been regarded as one of the club's most promising prospects.

== International career ==
Farré has represented Spain internationally at youth level being part of the U16 and U17 squads.

== Style of play ==
Farré mainly operates as a defender. He can play as a right-back or center defender and thanks to his mastery of both legs, he can also play as a left-back. He is known not only for his strength and aerial ability but also for his technique with the ball. Other of his strengthness are his ability to get off the ball, good ball delivery and his ability to perform outstandingly under pressure.

== Career statistics ==
=== Club ===
As of match played 24 May 2025

Appearances and goals by club, season and competition
Club	Season	League			Cup		Europe		Other		Total	
Club	Season	Division	Apps	Goals	Apps	Goals	Apps	Goals	Apps	Goals	Apps	Goals
Barcelona B	2024–25	Primera Federación	21	0	—		—		—		21	0
Barcelona B	2025–26	Segunda Federación	0	0	—		—		—		0	0
Barcelona B	Total		21	0	0	0	0	0	0	0	21	0
Career total			21	0	0	0	0	0	0	0	21	0

== Honours ==
Barcelona

- UEFA Youth League: 2024–25
