= Héctor Fort =

Spanish footballer (born 2006)

Personal information
- Full name: Héctor Fort García
- Date of birth: 2 August 2006 (age 20)
- Place of birth: Barcelona, Spain
- Height: 1.85 m (6 ft 1 in)
- Position: Right-back

Team information
- Current team: Real Sociedad
- Number: 22

Youth career
- 2011–2013: Anguera
- 2013–2023: Barcelona

Senior career*
Years	Team	Apps	(Gls)
2023–2025	Barcelona B	14	(1)
2023–2026	Barcelona	24	(0)
2025–2026	→ Elche (loan)	14	(2)
2026–	Real Sociedad	7	(0)

International career^{‡}
2021–2022	Spain U16	6	(0)
2022–2023	Spain U17	15	(0)
2024–2025	Spain U19	9	(0)
2025	Spain U20	1	(0)
- * Club domestic league appearances and goals as of 21:08, 22 November 2026 (UTC) ‡ National team caps and goals as of 4 September 2025 (UTC)

Héctor Fort García (born 2 August 2006) is a Spanish professional footballer who plays as a right-back for La Liga club Real Sociedad.

== Club career ==
=== Barcelona ===
Born in Barcelona, Catalonia, Fort signed for La Masia from Anguera, representing the club's Juvenil A side in the 2022–23 season and playing all six matches in their Youth League campaign. The following year in Barcelona's preseason ahead of the 2023–24 season, Fort made his uncompetitive debut for the first team in a friendly match against Vissel Kobe on 6 June 2023. He was one of six players to make their debut for the first team. Promoted to Barcelona's reserve side, Fort made his debut for the squad on 28 August 2023 in a 1–0 defeat to Logroñés in their season opener of the Primera Federación.

Fort made his senior debut for the first-team on 13 December 2023 in a 3–2 away defeat against Royal Antwerp in the Champions League.

On 28 May 2024, Barcelona announced that they had reached an agreement with Fort for the extension of his contract, tying him to the club until 30 June 2026.

==== Loan to Elche ====
On 1 September 2025, Fort was loaned to Elche for the season. Later that year, he received the Goal of the Month award for his goal against Rayo Vallecano in December.

=== Real Sociedad ===
On 29 August 2026, Real Sociedad announced the signing of Fort on a five-year contract.

== International career ==
A Spanish youth international, Fort has represented the country since the under-16 level. He was named in the under-17 squad for the 2023 UEFA European Under-17 Championship in Hungary, and later that year was called up for the 2023 FIFA U-17 World Cup in Indonesia. He also represented the Spain U19 during the 2025 UEFA European Under-19 Championship qualification.

In August 2025, Fort was part of a 24-player preliminary squad for the 2025 FIFA U-20 World Cup. However, he did not make the final cut.

== Career statistics ==
=== Club ===
As of match played 22 November 2026

Appearances and goals by club, season and competition
Club	Season	League			Copa del Rey		Europe		Other		Total	
Club	Season	Division	Apps	Goals	Apps	Goals	Apps	Goals	Apps	Goals	Apps	Goals
Barcelona Atlètic	2023–24	Primera Federación	13	1	—		—		4 (Note: Appearances in Primera Federación play-offs)	1	17	2
Barcelona Atlètic	2024–25	Primera Federación	1	0	—		—		0	0	1	0
Barcelona Atlètic	Total		14	1	—		—		4	1	18	2
Barcelona	2023–24	La Liga	7	0	2	0	1 (Note: Appearance(s) in UEFA Champions League)	0	0	0	10	0
Barcelona	2024–25	La Liga	17	0	1	0	2	0	0	0	20	0
Barcelona	Total		24	0	3	0	3	0	0	0	30	0
Elche (loan)	2025–26	La Liga	14	2	3	1	—		—		17	3
Real Sociedad	2026–27	La Liga	7	0	0	0	1 (Note: Appearance(s) in UEFA Europa League)	0	0	0	8	0
Career total			59	3	6	1	4	0	4	1	73	5

== Honours ==
Barcelona

- La Liga: 2024–25
- Copa del Rey: 2024–25
- Supercopa de España: 2025

Individual

- La Liga Goal of the Month: December 2025
