= Dani Rodríguez (footballer, born 2005) =

Spanish footballer

Personal information
- Full name: Daniel Rodríguez Crespo
- Date of birth: 9 August 2005 (age 21)
- Place of birth: Astigarraga, Spain
- Height: 1.75 m (5 ft 9 in)
- Position: Winger

Team information
- Current team: Dinamo Zagreb
- Number: 7

Youth career
- Real Sociedad
- 2020–2024: Barcelona

Senior career*
Years	Team	Apps	(Gls)
2023–2026	Barcelona B	40	(6)
2025	Barcelona	1	(0)
2026–	Dinamo Zagreb	3	(1)

International career^{‡}
2022	Spain U17	6	(2)
2022	Spain U18	4	(1)
2023–2025	Spain U19	18	(5)
2025–	Spain U21	2	(0)
Medal record
Men's football
Representing Spain
UEFA European Under-19 Championship
Winner	2024 Northern Ireland
- * Club domestic league appearances and goals as of 27 October 2026 ‡ National team caps and goals as of 22:33, 14 October 2025 (UTC)

Daniel "Dani" Rodríguez Crespo (born 9 August 2005) is a Spanish professional footballer who plays as a winger for Dinamo Zagreb.

== Club career ==
Born in Astigarraga, Gipuzkoa, Basque Country, Rodríguez started his career with Real Sociedad. In March 2020, fellow La Liga side Barcelona put in a bid for the young midfielder, and he joined in April of the same year. He had previously been linked with a move to French side Paris Saint-Germain. Rodríguez made his senior debut with the reserves on 16 September 2023, in a 2–2 draw with Fuenlabrada in Primera Federación. He made his professional debut for Barcelona on 3 May 2025 in a 2–1 away win over Real Valladolid in La Liga. He was substituted after 38 minutes with an injury, being replaced by Lamine Yamal.

== International career ==
Rodríguez has represented Spain at youth international level. After recovering from a sprain in his knee ligament, he went on to star at the 2022 UEFA European Under-17 Championship for Spain.

== Career statistics ==
As of match played 27 October 2026

Appearances and goals by club, season and competition
Club	Season	League			National cup		Europe		Other		Total	
Club	Season	Division	Apps	Goals	Apps	Goals	Apps	Goals	Apps	Goals	Apps	Goals
Barcelona B	2023–24	Primera Federación	10	0	—		—		3 (Note: Appearances in Primera Federación play-offs)	0	13	0
Barcelona B	2024–25	Primera Federación	10	3	—		—		—		10	3
Barcelona B	2025–26	Segunda Federación	20	3	—		—		—		6	0
Barcelona B	Total		26	3	—		—		3	0	29	3
Barcelona	2024–25	La Liga	1	0	0	0	—		0	0	1	0
Dinamo Zagreb	2026–27	Croatian Football League	3	1	1	0	2 (Note: Appearances in UEFA Europa League)	0	—		6	1
Career total			30	4	1	0	2	0	3	0	36	4

== Honours ==
Barcelona

- La Liga: 2024–25

Spain U19

- UEFA European Under-19 Championship: 2024

Individual

- UEFA European Under-19 Championship Team of the Tournament: 2024
