= Ricardo de Burgos Bengoetxea =

Spanish football referee (born 1986)

Ricardo Burgos
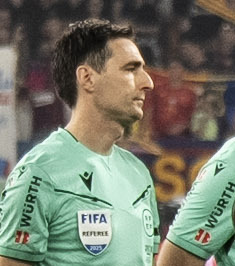
- Burgos in 2025
- Full name: Ricardo de Burgos Bengoetxea
- Born: 16 March 1986 (age 40); Bilbao, Spain
- Other occupation: Dental technician

Domestic
Years	League	Role
2011–2015	Segunda División	Referee
2015–	La Liga	Referee

International
Years	League	Role
2018–	FIFA listed	Referee

Ricardo de Burgos Bengoetxea (born 16 March 1986) is a football referee who officiates in La Liga. He has been a FIFA referee since 2018, and is ranked as a UEFA first category referee.

== Refereeing career ==
In 2011, De Burgos Bengoetxea began officiating in the Segunda División, and in 2015 he was promoted to La Liga, the top division of Spanish football. His first match as referee was on 23 August 2015 between Levante and Celta Vigo. In 2017, he officiated the first leg of the 2017 Supercopa de España between Barcelona and Real Madrid. In 2018, he was put on the FIFA referees list. He officiated his first senior international match on 10 October 2019 in UEFA Euro 2020 qualifying between Belarus and Estonia.

Prior the 2025 Copa del Rey final between Real Madrid and Barcelona, De Burgos Bengoetxea was subjected to public pressure when Real Madrid TV released a critical video highlighting his past decisions perceived to favour Barcelona. De Burgos Bengoetxea later spoke emotionally about the impact, revealing his son had been bullied at school as a result, and emphasizing the personal toll of the attacks. During the final, which Barcelona won 3–2 after extra time, De Burgos Bengoetxea sent off three Real Madrid players, including Antonio Rüdiger for throwing an object, Lucas Vázquez for protesting on the pitch, and Jude Bellingham for aggressively confronting him after the whistle.

== Personal life ==
De Burgos Bengoetxea is a native of Bilbao, and works as a dental technician.
