= 2025 Supercopa de España =

Spanish football competition played in Saudi Arabia

Tournament details
- Host country: Saudi Arabia
- Dates: 8–12 January 2025
- Teams: 4
- Venue: 1 (in 1 host city)

Final positions
- Champions: Barcelona (15th title)
- Runners-up: Real Madrid

Tournament statistics
- Matches played: 3
- Goals scored: 12 (4 per match)
- Attendance: 164,242 (54,747 per match)
- Top scorer(s): Raphinha; Rodrygo; Lamine Yamal (2 goals each)

The 2025 Supercopa de España was the 41st edition of the Supercopa de España, an annual football competition for clubs in the Spanish football league system that were successful in its major competitions in the preceding season.

Barcelona won the tournament for their record-extending fifteenth Supercopa de España title.

== Qualification ==
The tournament featured the winners and runners-up of the 2023–24 Copa del Rey and 2023–24 La Liga.

=== Qualified teams ===
The following four teams qualified for the tournament.

Team	Method of qualification	Appearance	Last appearance as	Previous performance		
Team	Method of qualification	Appearance	Last appearance as	Winner(s)	Runners-up	Semi-finalists
Athletic Bilbao	2023–24 Copa del Rey winners	7th	2022 runners-up	3	3	–
Real Madrid	2023–24 La Liga winners	21st	2024 winners	13	6	1
Mallorca	2023–24 Copa del Rey runners-up	3rd	2003 runners-up	1	1	–
Barcelona	2023–24 La Liga runners-up	29th	2024 runners-up	14	12	2

== Venue ==
All three matches were held at the King Abdullah Sports City in Jeddah, Saudi Arabia.

Location of the host city of the 2025 Supercopa de España.	City	Stadium
Location of the host city of the 2025 Supercopa de España.	Jeddah	King Abdullah Sports City
Location of the host city of the 2025 Supercopa de España.	Capacity: 62,345	

== Matches ==
- Times listed are SAST (UTC+3).

=== Bracket ===
Semi-finals
9 January 2025 – Jeddah
Real Madrid	3
Mallorca	0
8 January 2025 – Jeddah
Athletic Bilbao	0
Barcelona	2

Final
12 January 2025 – Jeddah
Real Madrid	2
Barcelona	5

=== Semi-finals ===
8 January 2025
22:00

Athletic Bilbao	0–2	Barcelona
	Report	Gavi 17'; Yamal 52'

King Abdullah Sports City, Jeddah
Attendance: 42,000
Referee: Miguel Ángel Ortiz Arias (Community of Madrid)

9 January 2025
22:00

Real Madrid	3–0	Mallorca
Bellingham 63'; Valjent 90+2' (o.g.); Rodrygo 90+5'	Report

King Abdullah Sports City, Jeddah
Attendance: 62,242
Referee: Ricardo de Burgos Bengoetxea (Basque Country)

=== Final ===
12 January 2025
22:00

Real Madrid	2–5	Barcelona
Mbappé 5'; Rodrygo 60'	Report	Yamal 22'; Lewandowski 36' (pen.); Raphinha 39', 48'; Balde 45+10'

King Abdullah Sports City, Jeddah
Attendance: 60,000
Referee: Jesús Gil Manzano (Extremadura)

== See also ==
- 2024–25 La Liga
- 2024–25 Copa del Rey
