= Premi Barça Jugadors =

Annual prize awarded for fair play

Premi Barça Jugadors (Barça Players' Award) is a prize which is awarded by the Barça Players' Association to the Barcelona's first team player who has shown most fair play throughout the season.

The award is decided by a jury of Association members of the club. In 2017–18, it was the first time ever that Barcelona's players were involved in the voting process.

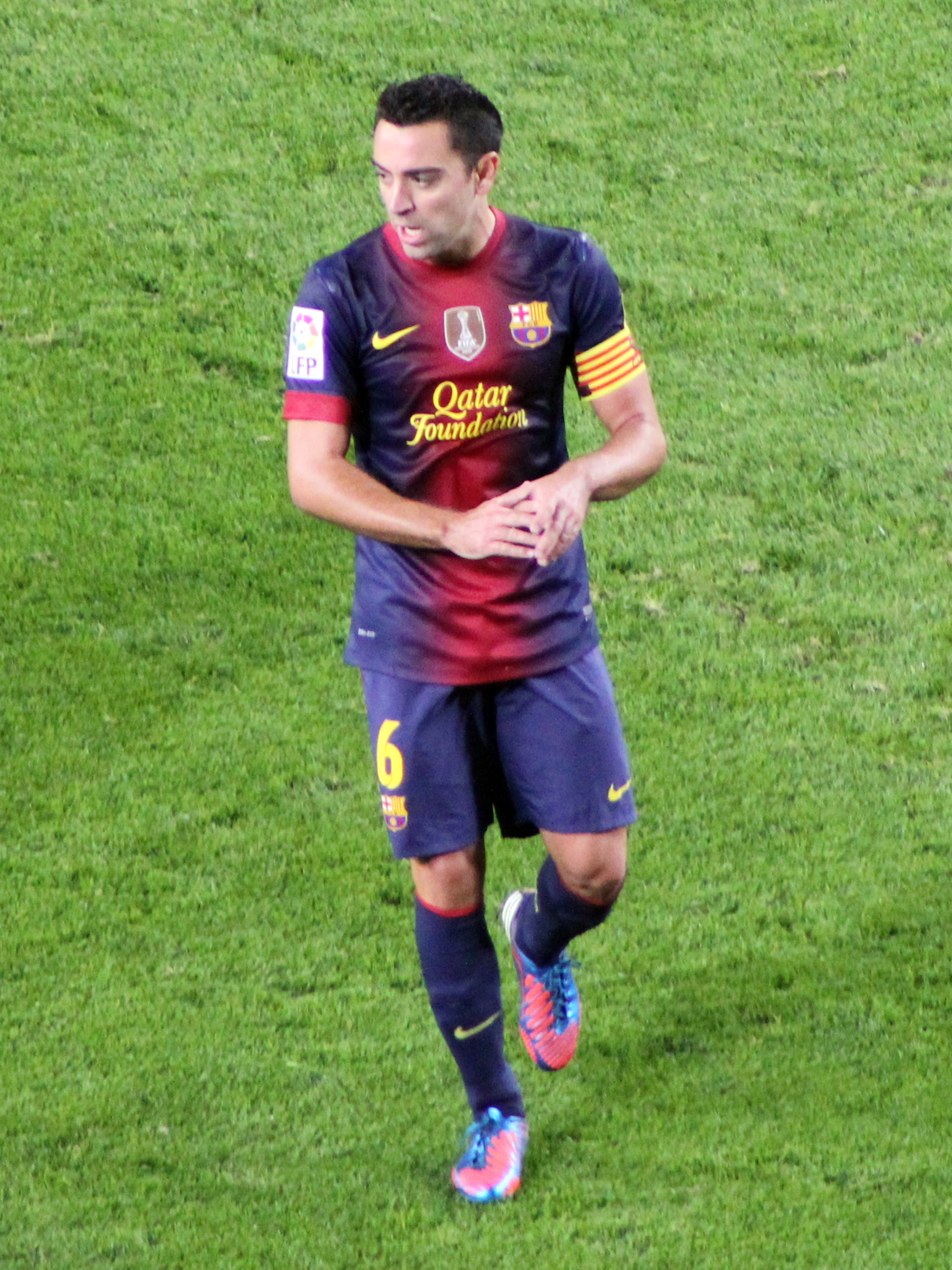
Xavi won the prize two consecutive times, in 2012 and 2013.

== Winners ==
List of Winners
| Season | Men | Women | Ref. |
|---|---|---|---|
| 2009–10 | (Spain) Bojan | Not awarded | |
| 2010–11 | (Spain) Andrés Iniesta | Not awarded | |
| 2011–12 | (Spain) Xavi | Not awarded | |
| 2012–13 | (Spain) Xavi (2) | Not awarded | |
| 2013–14 | (Spain) Carles Puyol | Not awarded | |
| 2014–15 | (Argentina) Javier Mascherano | Not awarded | |
| 2015–16 | (Argentina) Lionel Messi | Not awarded | |
| 2016–17 | (Spain) Sergi Roberto | Not awarded | |
| 2017–18 | (Croatia) Ivan Rakitić | Not awarded | |
| 2018–19 | (Germany) Marc-André ter Stegen | (Spain) Alexia Putellas | |
| 2020–21 | (Netherlands) Frenkie de Jong | (Spain) Aitana Bonmatí | |
| 2021–22 | (Spain) Pedri | (Spain) Aitana Bonmatí (2) | |
| 2022–23 | (Germany) Marc-André ter Stegen (2) | (Spain) Aitana Bonmatí (3) | |
| 2023–24 | (Spain) Lamine Yamal | (Spain) Aitana Bonmatí (4) | |
| 2024–25 | (Spain) Pedri (2) | (Spain) Clàudia Pina | |
| 2025–26 | (Spain) Pau Cubarsí | (Spain) Cata Coll | |

== See also ==
- Trofeo Aldo Rovira
- Joan Gamper Trophy
