= Marc-André ter Stegen =

German footballer (born 1992)

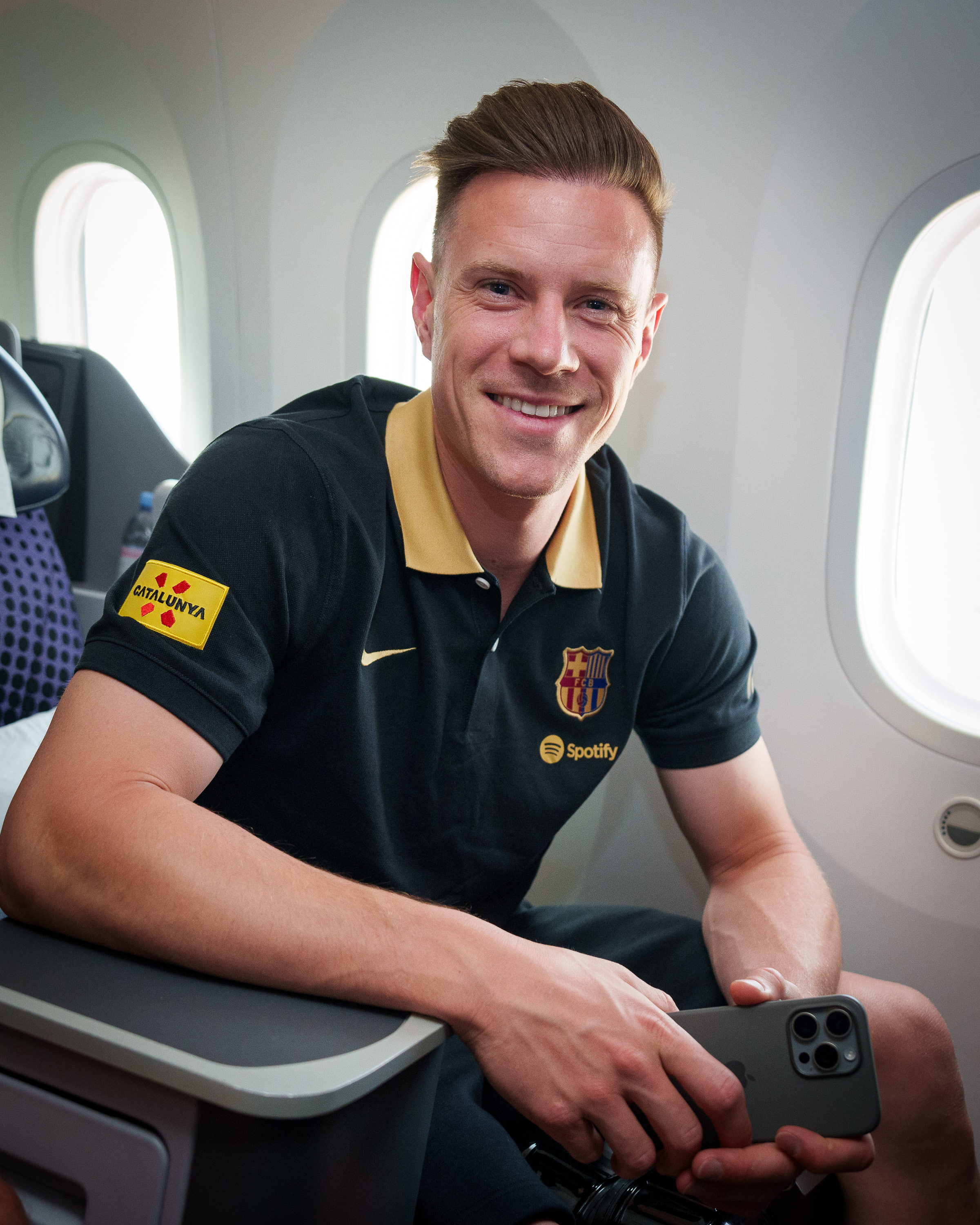
- Ter Stegen with Barcelona in 2024

Personal information
- Full name: Marc-André ter Stegen
- Date of birth: 30 April 1992 (age 34)
- Place of birth: Mönchengladbach, Germany
- Height: 1.87 m (6 ft 2 in)
- Position: Goalkeeper

Team information
- Current team: Ajax (on loan from Barcelona)
- Number: 1

Youth career
- 1996–2010: Borussia Mönchengladbach

Senior career*
Years	Team	Apps	(Gls)
2009–2011	Borussia Mönchengladbach II	18	(0)
2010–2014	Borussia Mönchengladbach	108	(0)
2014–	Barcelona	291	(0)
2026	→ Girona (loan)	2	(0)
2026–	→ Ajax (loan)	11	(0)

International career^{‡}
2007–2008	Germany U16	7	(0)
2008–2009	Germany U17	16	(0)
2009–2010	Germany U18	8	(0)
2010–2011	Germany U19	5	(0)
2012–2015	Germany U21	13	(0)
2012–	Germany	47	(0)
Medal record
Men's football
Representing Germany
FIFA Confederations Cup
Winner	2017
UEFA European Under-17 Championship
Winner	2009
- * Club domestic league appearances and goals as of 18:40, 8 November 2026 (UTC) ‡ National team caps and goals as of 21:40, 16 November 2026 (UTC)

Marc-André ter Stegen (German pronunciation: [ˌmaʁk ʔanˈdʁeː teːɐ̯ ˈsteːɡn̩]; born 30 April 1992) is a German professional footballer who plays as a goalkeeper for Eredivisie club Ajax, on loan from La Liga club Barcelona, and the Germany national team. He is known for his reflexes, passing, and ball-playing.

After four seasons in the Bundesliga with Borussia Mönchengladbach, making 108 league appearances, Ter Stegen joined Barcelona for €12 million in 2014. He won the treble in his first season in Spain, playing for Barcelona in Copa del Rey and UEFA Champions League.

Ter Stegen represented Germany at several youth levels and made his senior international debut in 2012. He was part of the German squads that reached the semi-finals of UEFA Euro 2016 and won the 2017 FIFA Confederations Cup, and was also a member of the German side that took part at the 2018 FIFA World Cup, 2022 FIFA World Cup and UEFA Euro 2024.

== Club career ==
=== Borussia Mönchengladbach ===
==== 2010–11 season ====
Ter Stegen began his career at hometown team Borussia Mönchengladbach. In the first half of the 2010–11 season, he established himself as the star of their reserve team and was frequently seen on the first-team bench. Whilst he was enjoying a relatively successful season, the same could not be said for his first-team colleagues. Mönchengladbach's senior side were seemingly failing in their efforts to avoid relegation, and on 14 February 2011, manager Michael Frontzeck was replaced by Lucien Favre, with the team rooted to the bottom of the Bundesliga, having accumulated only 16 points after 22 match days.

The team’s results soon improved, but the erratic form of first-choice goalkeeper Logan Bailly held the team back. Whilst he was able to produce match-winning performances such as the one against Werder Bremen, these were few and far between, and were frequently cancelled out by uninspiring matches. The fans of Mönchengladbach were quick to discredit the Belgian international, with some accusing him of putting more effort into his modelling career than his football. Ter Stegen's progress for the reserve team had not gone unnoticed by the supporters, and the new manager was inundated with demands to start the young prodigy in the league. Favre eventually lost patience with Bailly, and on 10 April 2011, relegated him to the bench in favour of Ter Stegen for the match against 1. FC Köln. The young German did not disappoint, and the defence boasted a previously unseen solidity. He kept his place in the team for the remainder of the season, keeping four clean-sheets out of a possible five in the last five matchdays as Mönchengladbach avoided relegation via the playoffs. During this run, he shot to prominence with a last-man-standing display against eventual champions Borussia Dortmund, making a string of world-class saves as Mönchengladbach secured a famous 1–0 victory.

==== 2011–12 season ====
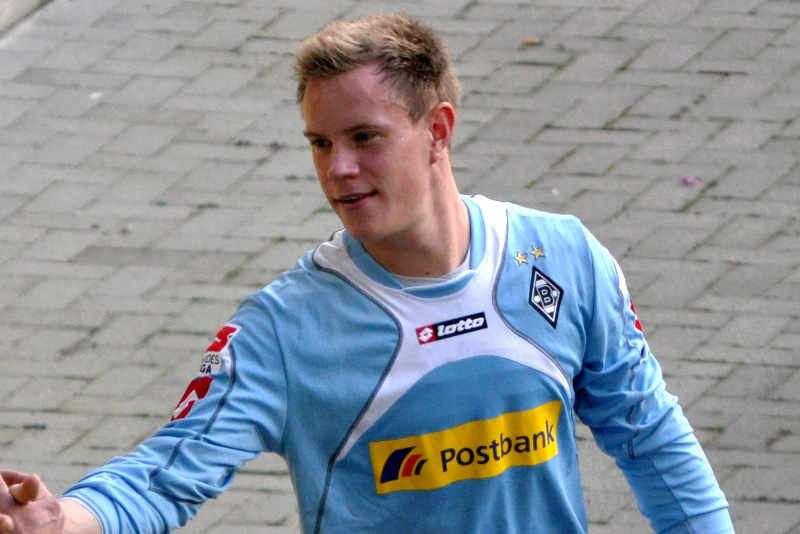
Ter Stegen with Borussia Mönchengladbach in 2011

Ter Stegen's status as first-choice goalkeeper was inevitable when Bailly was sent on loan to Swiss side Neuchâtel Xamax and the No.1 shirt was delegated to Ter Stegen, who had previously worn 21.

During the summer transfer window, Bayern Munich had succeeded in their drawn-out pursuit of Schalke 04's captain Manuel Neuer. The German international made his debut against Ter Stegen's Mönchengladbach at the Allianz Arena. The match did not go the way the pundits predicted, however, with Ter Stegen producing yet another inspired display whilst his counterpart Neuer made the error that condemned Bayern to a 1–0 defeat. Following this match, Borussia Mönchengladbach embarked on an unlikely title challenge, with Ter Stegen and fellow youngster Marco Reus providing the inspiration for Mönchengladbach.

==== 2012–13 season ====
After the departures of Reus and Dante, Ter Stegen emerged as Mönchengladbach's main star for the season. He was again first-choice, and in February 2013, it was reported that Ter Stegen signed a pre-agreement with La Liga club Barcelona. The deal was later denied by himself.

==== 2013–14 season ====
After being strongly linked with Barcelona, Ter Stegen remained at Mönchengladbach for the new season. On 6 January 2014, he rejected a new deal from the club, raising the speculation over his future. In the last home match of the season, a 3–1 home success against Mainz 05 on 5 May, Ter Stegen gave an emotional farewell to Borussia Mönchengladbach.

=== Barcelona ===
==== 2014–15 season ====
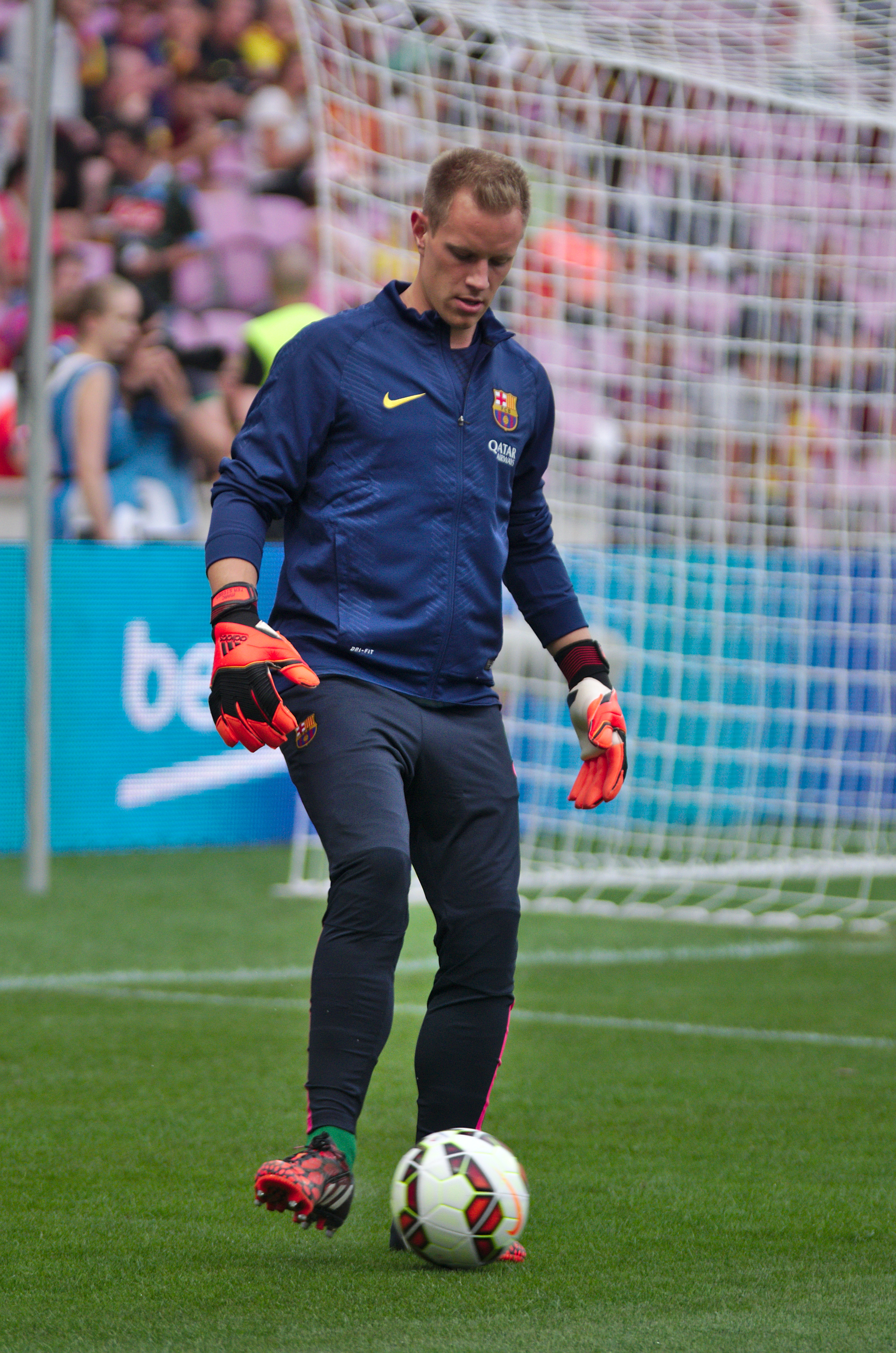
Ter Stegen warming up for Barcelona in 2014

On 19 May 2014, Ter Stegen was announced as the new goalkeeper of Spanish club Barcelona, with goalkeeper Claudio Bravo, after the departures of Víctor Valdés and José Manuel Pinto, effective during the summer transfer window. On 22 May 2014, he signed a five-year contract that would keep him at the club until June 2019. The transfer fee was €12 million (£9.7 million), and the buy-out clause was set to €80 million (£63.6 million). After the move, Ter Stegen said joining the club was the right move and that he aimed to settle at the club.

Ter Stegen suffered an injury prior to the first league match of the season. Due to this injury, Barcelona manager Luis Enrique made Bravo the starting league goalkeeper, where he would go on to win the Zamora Trophy. Ter Stegen, ended up not playing at all in Barça's victorious league campaign, but he was made the first-choice goalkeeper in both the Copa del Rey matches and in the UEFA Champions League. He made his debut in the latter tournament on 17 September, keeping a clean sheet in a 1–0 home win over APOEL. He helped Barcelona win the final of the domestic Copa Del Rey cup in his first season, a 3–1 victory against Athletic Bilbao on 30 May 2015. A week later, he played in the Champions League Final at the Olympiastadion in Berlin, a 3–1 win over Juventus. He won the "Best Save" award for his spectacular "goal-line" save against Bayern Munich, in the second leg of the Champions League semi-final.

==== 2015–16 season ====
His second season opened with victory in the 2015 UEFA Super Cup against Sevilla in Tbilisi on 11 August. Having led 4–1, he then conceded three more goals to send the match into extra time, in which Barcelona won 5–4. He made his La Liga debut on 12 September 2015 in a match against Atlético Madrid, which Barcelona won 2–1.

In March 2016, Ter Stegen said on the subject of Luis Enrique's rotation policy: "In the long run, these 25 games per season are not enough for me. The decision is made by the coach. I hope that the quality I've shown recently is rewarded."

==== 2016–17 season ====
Ter Stegen picked up injuries at the start of the season, due to which he missed the Supercopa de España and league matches. He became Barcelona's first-choice goalkeeper after Claudio Bravo left for Manchester City on 25 August 2016. On 13 September 2016, Ter Stegen gave away and saved a penalty from Moussa Dembélé which kept the score at 1–0 and which eventually led to a 7–0 victory for Barcelona against Celtic in the UEFA Champions League. On 2 October 2016, Ter Stegen had a poor performance when he made two crucial mistakes, which cost Barcelona the match, as they eventually went on to lose 4–3 against Celta Vigo. He later apologized and said that he would not change his playing style. He later received positive reviews for his role in Barcelona's 6–1 comeback victory against Paris Saint-Germain in the 2nd leg of the Champions League round-of-16 for receiving a crucial foul from Paris Saint-Germain midfielder Marco Verratti in the opposition half – which led to Sergi Roberto's crucial 94th-minute winner that kept Barcelona in the hunt for the Champions League. As a result, Barcelona qualified for the Champions League quarterfinals, where they were eventually eliminated by Juventus. Ter Stegen proved to be even more decisive in the second league El Clásico that season by producing a staggering 12 saves in a 3–2 victory at the Santiago Bernabéu against Real Madrid, which kept Barcelona alive in the race for La Liga while being three points adrift of Real Madrid.

==== 2017–18 season ====
On 29 May 2017, Ter Stegen signed a new contract with Barcelona, keeping him at the club until 2022, with his buyout clause raised to €180 million.

On 14 October 2017, Ter Stegen made some critical saves, including two well-placed shots from Antoine Griezmann of Atlético Madrid, en route to a 1–1 draw at the newly-rebuilt Wanda Metropolitano, preserving Barcelona's unbeaten record in the 2017–18 La Liga season. On 28 October 2017, Ter Stegen produced a phenomenal display against Athletic Bilbao in an eventual 2–0 win for Barcelona, denying Aritz Aduriz from a one-on-one position and producing a brilliant diving effort from the same opponent with five minutes remaining on the clock. As of 20 November 2017, Ter Stegen, assisted by the guidance of the manager at that time Ernesto Valverde, along with the good form of teammate and defender Samuel Umtiti, was responsible for Barcelona having the fewest goals conceded of any club in Europe's top five leagues, with just four conceded. On 22 November 2017, Ter Stegen saved a 90th minute shot from Paulo Dybala against Juventus, which was similar to a shot he had scored against Ter Stegen in the previous season's Champions League defeat. The result was good enough to secure a draw and a first place position in Group D, qualifying Barcelona to the 2017–18 UEFA Champions League knockout phase. At this point, Ter Stegen had saved 23 of his last 24 shots on target for a 96% save percentage.

On 17 April 2018, Ter Stegen captained Barcelona for the first time in a 2–2 draw against Celta Vigo at the Balaídos in the absence of regular captains Andrés Iniesta and Lionel Messi, with the two starting on the bench.

==== 2018–19 season ====
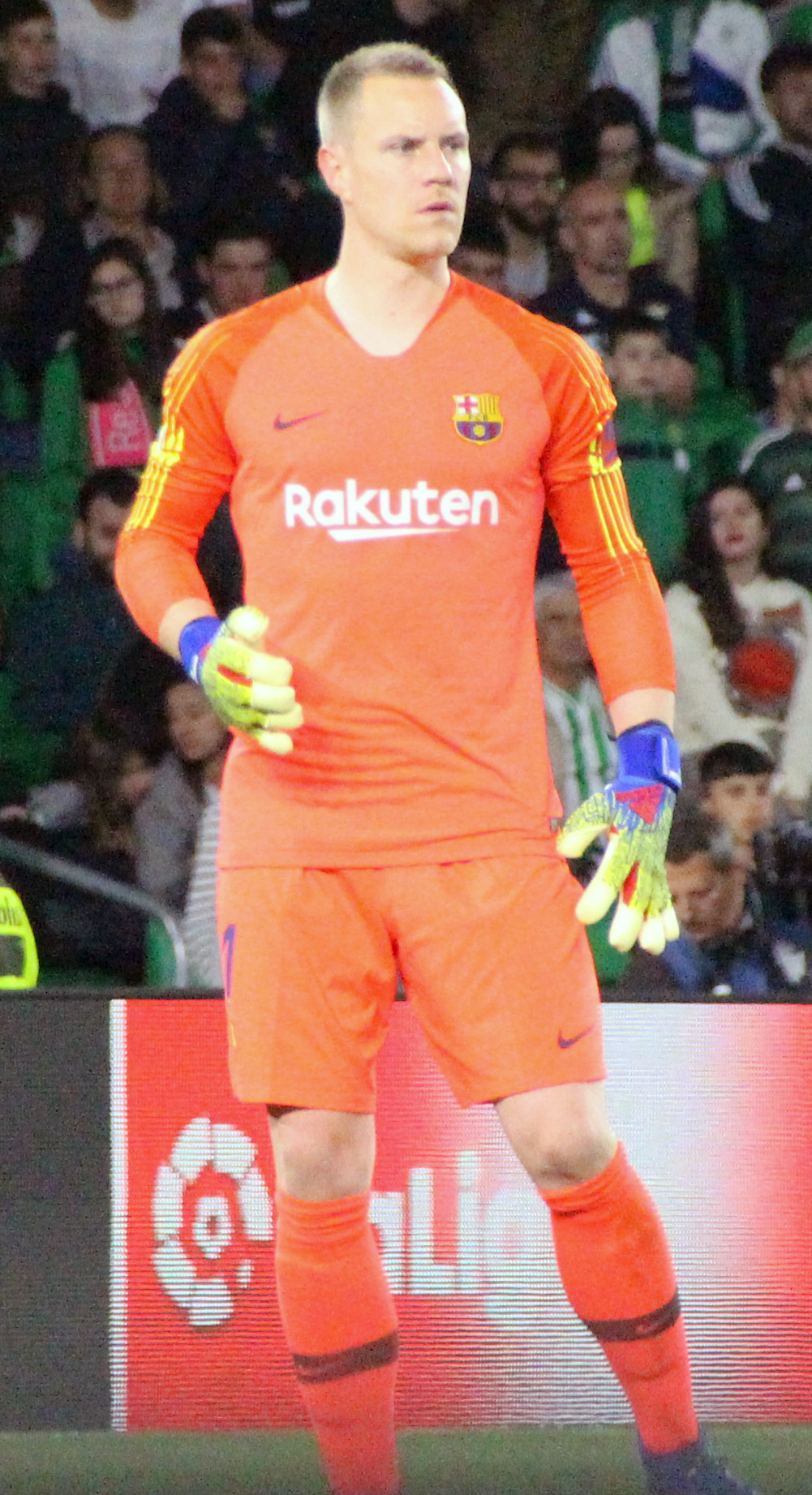
Ter Stegen playing against Real Betis in March 2019

On 12 August, 2018, Ter Stegen started for Barcelona in the 2018 Supercopa de España, in which the club defeated Sevilla 2–1 to win the title, with Ter Stegen making a late penalty save to secure the victory.

Ter Stegen won his fourth La Liga title with Barcelona, and reached the semi-finals of the 2018–19 UEFA Champions League, where his team was eliminated from the competition after losing 3–4 on aggregate against Liverpool, including a 0–4 loss at Anfield in the second leg.

==== 2019–20 season ====
On 28 September 2019, Ter Stegen provided an assist to Luis Suárez for the first goal in a 2–0 away win over Getafe, becoming the first Barcelona goalkeeper to provide an assist in La Liga in the 21st century. On 6 October, Ter Stegen marked his 200th game for Barça with a clean sheet in a 4–0 home win against Sevilla. He provided another assist on 7 December to Griezmann for the first goal in a 5–2 home victory vs Mallorca. For the first time in his Barça career, Ter Stegen kept five consecutive clean sheets. The fifth was against Athletic Bilbao in a 1–0 win on 23 June 2020. On 14 August 2020, he allowed eight goals in the 2–8 defeat against eventual winners Bayern Munich in the 2019–20 UEFA Champions League quarter-final in Lisbon.

==== 2020–21 season ====
After the end of the previous season, it was announced that Ter Stegen underwent a successful knee surgery which would be keeping him out of the team for over two months. He missed several matches and was replaced by Neto.

On 20 October 2020, Ter Stegen extended his contract with Barcelona that would keep him at the club until 30 June 2025, with a buy-out clause of €500 million. On 24 November, Ter Stegen reached his 100th clean sheet with Barcelona in a 4–0 win over Dynamo Kyiv in a Champions League group stage match at the NSC Olimpiyskiy Stadium in Kyiv.

On 6 January 2021, in a 3–2 league victory against Athletic Bilbao at the San Mamés, Ter Stegen reached 250 appearances for Barcelona in all competitions, making him the goalkeeper with the fifth–most appearances in the club's history.

That year, he won the Copa del Rey with the club against the previous runners-up Athletic Bilbao 4–0.

==== 2021–22 season ====
Ter Stegen did not win any trophies with the side and the latter came second in La Liga. Barcelona were knocked out in the Champions League group stage and then knocked out in the quarter-finals of the Europa League by Eintracht Frankfurt. The season ended with a 2–0 loss at home to Villarreal.

==== 2022–23 season ====
On 30 December 2022, Ter Stegen was named Barcelona's fourth captain, after Gerard Piqué's retirement.

Ter Stegen won his fifth La Liga title with Barcelona. Leading a Barcelona defence bolstered by the signings of Jules Koundé and Andreas Christensen, Ter Stegen won his first Zamora Trophy for conceding just 18 goals in 38 appearances. In addition, his 26 clean sheets equalled Paco Liaño's La Liga record set in the 1993–94 season. Despite Barcelona's La Liga success, they were knocked out of the Champions League group stage and then eliminated from the Europa League in the knockout round play-offs by Manchester United.

==== 2023–24 season ====
On 25 August 2023, Ter Stegen extended his contract with the club until 2028. In September 2023, he was nominated for the Yashin Trophy. On 8 March 2024, he made his 400th appearance for the club in a 1–0 victory over Mallorca, becoming the third goalkeeper to achieve this feat following Andoni Zubizarreta and Víctor Valdés.

==== 2024–25 season ====
On 11 August 2024, following Sergi Roberto's departure from the club, Ter Stegen was announced as Barça's new captain. Following a ruptured patellar tendon injury during the match against Villarreal in September, he was ruled out for most of the 2024–25 season. Despite his injury, he lifted his first trophy as captain on 12 January 2025, following a 5–2 victory over Real Madrid in the Supercopa de España final. On 3 May 2025, he returned from injury, starting in a 2–1 away victory against Real Valladolid.

==== 2025–26 season ====
In July 2025, head coach Hansi Flick reportedly informed Ter Stegen that he would be relegated to third-choice goalkeeper following the arrival of Joan García and the contract extension of Wojciech Szczęsny. A month later, Ter Stegen was temporarily stripped of the club captaincy after facing disciplinary action for refusing to share his medical data with La Liga, which could have enabled the club to register new players depending on the expected duration of his absence. Afterwards, Ter Stegen signed the necessary authorization, the disciplinary case was closed, and he was reinstated as first-team captain. Later that year, on 16 December, he played his first match of the season in a 2–0 away win over Guadalajara in the Copa del Rey.

==== Loan to Girona ====
On 20 January 2026, Girona announced that Ter Stegen would join on loan for the remainder of the season. He was authorized to wear number 22. On 31 January, he suffered a hamstring injury in his second appearance against Real Oviedo, sidelining him for an extended period. On 24 May 2026, with Barcelona confirmed to be champions and Girona's relegation confirmed, he became the first player to win the La Liga with one team and get relegated from La Liga with another team during the same season.

==== Loan to Ajax ====
On 4 August 2026, Ter Stegen joined Eredivisie club Ajax on loan for the 2026–27 season. He made his debut on 9 August, keeping a clean sheet in a 2–0 win at Zwolle.

== International career ==
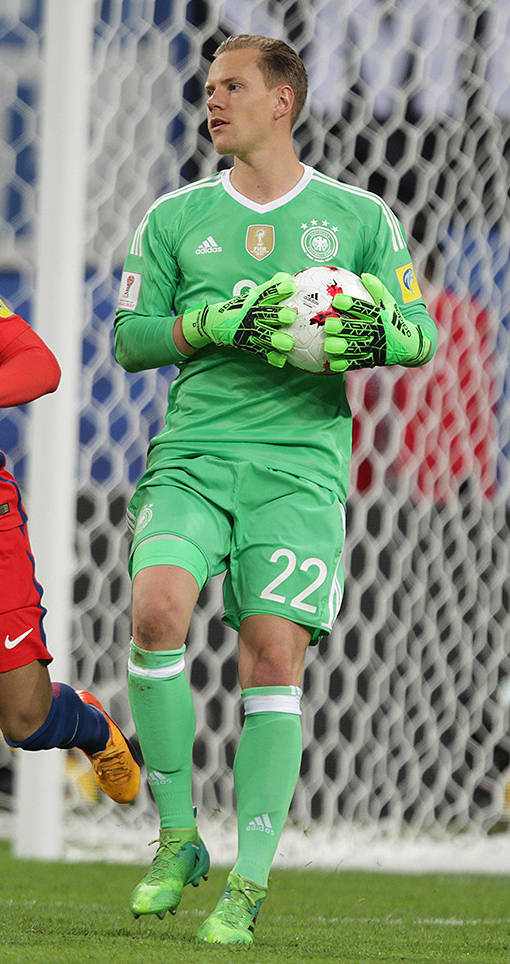
Ter Stegen during his performance in the 2017 FIFA Confederations Cup final against Chile

=== Youth ===
In 2009, Ter Stegen participated on the winning team of the UEFA European Under-17 Championship.

On 27 June 2015, Ter Stegen conceded five goals in Germany U21s' match against Portugal U21 in the semi-finals of the UEFA European Under-21 Championship in Czech Republic.

=== Senior ===
Ter Stegen was rewarded for his performances by Joachim Löw, who called him up to Germany's provisional squad for UEFA Euro 2012, but did not make the final 23-man. On 26 May 2012, Ter Stegen debuted in a 5–3 loss against Switzerland in a friendly match. He stopped a penalty from Lionel Messi in his second international match in a 1–3 loss against Argentina on 15 August, immediately after coming on following Ron-Robert Zieler's sending off.

Ter Stegen was included in Germany's UEFA Euro 2016 squad, but remained on the bench throughout the entire tournament, as a back-up to starter Manuel Neuer; Germany reached the semi-finals, and were eliminated following a 2–0 loss to hosts France.

At the 2017 FIFA Confederations Cup, Ter Stegen started in all of his team's matches, apart from the first group-stage match, as Germany went on to win the tournament. For his performance in the final against Chile, he was named the Man of the Match.

On 15 May 2018, Ter Stegen was included in Germany's provisional 27-man squad for the 2018 FIFA World Cup. Löw included Ter Stegen in Germany's final 23-man squad for the World Cup on 4 June 2018.

In September 2019, Ter Stegen engaged in a minor war of words with Manuel Neuer over the first-choice goalkeeper spot for Germany.

In May 2021, Ter Stegen was omitted from Germany's UEFA Euro 2020 squad after opting to undergo surgery to treat an injury to the patellar tendon in his right knee.

Ter Stegen was included in Germany's 26-man squad for the 2022 FIFA World Cup held in Qatar. He was an unused substitute for all the matches.

Ter Stegen was named in Germany's squad for UEFA Euro 2024 on home soil, serving as a back-up to Neuer once again; Germany were eliminated by eventual champions Spain in the quarter-final following a 2–1 loss after extra-time. After the conclusion of the tournament, he became Germany's first-choice goalkeeper after Neuer retired from international football. The following year, he was Germany's starting goalkeeper as the team finished fourth in the 2025 UEFA Nations League Finals on home soil, losing 2–0 to France in the third place play-off. However, a long-term injury caused him to lose his place to Oliver Baumann, while Manuel Neuer came out of international retirement to be included in Germany's squad for the 2026 FIFA World Cup.

Ter Stegen started Germany's first UEFA Nations League match under new head coach Jürgen Klopp, a 1–1 away draw against the Netherlands on 24 September 2026.

== Style of play ==
Ter Stegen has been described as a tall, agile and consistent goalkeeper, with quick reflexes, good decision-making and excellent shot-stopping abilities between the posts; he is also strong in the air, good in one-on-one situations, and effective at communicating with his back-line courtesy of his strong personality. Due to his ability to read the game and speed when rushing off his line, he is able to anticipate opponents outside the area who have beaten the offside trap. Being highly competent with the ball at his feet, he is known for his control and accurate distribution of the ball, and often functions as a sweeper-keeper, due to his ability to play the ball out from the back. He often uses his legs to close down players and to make crucial saves in what has been described as a 'German goalkeeping style'. Moreover, he possesses good fundamental goalkeeping technique, and a strong positional sense. In 2020, former Spain and Barcelona goalkeeper Salvador Sadurní noted that Ter Stegen's style of play is very similar to that of his German compatriot Manuel Neuer. Regarded as a highly promising player in his youth, he has since established himself as one of the best goalkeepers in world football.

== Personal life ==
Ter Stegen was born in Mönchengladbach, North Rhine-Westphalia. He is of Dutch descent through his father. He married his longtime girlfriend, Daniela Jehle, in Sitges, near Barcelona. On 28 December 2019, she gave birth to their first child, Ben. On 6 March 2025, he announced via social media that he had split up with his wife, Daniela.

== Career statistics ==
=== Club ===
As of match played 8 November 2026

Appearances and goals by club, season and competition
Club	Season	League			National cup (Note: Includes DFB-Pokal, Copa del Rey, KNVB Cup)		Europe		Other		Total	
Club	Season	Division	Apps	Goals	Apps	Goals	Apps	Goals	Apps	Goals	Apps	Goals
Borussia Mönchengladbach II	2009–10	Regionalliga West	3	0	—		—		—		3	0
Borussia Mönchengladbach II	2010–11	Regionalliga West	15	0	—		—		—		15	0
Borussia Mönchengladbach II	Total		18	0	—		—		—		18	0
Borussia Mönchengladbach	2010–11	Bundesliga	6	0	0	0	—		2 (Note: Appearances in Bundesliga relegation play-offs)	0	8	0
Borussia Mönchengladbach	2011–12	Bundesliga	34	0	5	0	—		—		39	0
Borussia Mönchengladbach	2012–13	Bundesliga	34	0	2	0	9 (Note: Two appearances in UEFA Champions League, seven appearances in UEFA Europa League)	0	—		45	0
Borussia Mönchengladbach	2013–14	Bundesliga	34	0	1	0	—		—		35	0
Borussia Mönchengladbach	Total		108	0	8	0	9	0	2	0	127	0
Barcelona	2014–15	La Liga	0	0	8	0	13 (Note: Appearance(s) in UEFA Champions League)	0	—		21	0
Barcelona	2015–16	La Liga	7	0	7	0	10	0	2 (Note: One appearance in Supercopa de España, one appearance in UEFA Super Cup)	0	26	0
Barcelona	2016–17	La Liga	36	0	1	0	9	0	0	0	46	0
Barcelona	2017–18	La Liga	37	0	0	0	9	0	2 (Note: Appearance(s) in Supercopa de España)	0	48	0
Barcelona	2018–19	La Liga	35	0	2	0	11	0	1	0	49	0
Barcelona	2019–20	La Liga	36	0	2	0	8	0	0	0	46	0
Barcelona	2020–21	La Liga	31	0	4	0	5	0	2	0	42	0
Barcelona	2021–22	La Liga	35	0	1	0	12 (Note: Six appearances in UEFA Champions League, six appearances in UEFA Europa League)	0	1	0	49	0
Barcelona	2022–23	La Liga	38	0	3	0	7 (Note: Five appearances in UEFA Champions League, two appearances in UEFA Europa League)	0	2	0	50	0
Barcelona	2023–24	La Liga	28	0	0	0	8	0	0	0	36	0
Barcelona	2024–25	La Liga	8	0	0	0	1	0	0	0	9	0
Barcelona	2025–26	La Liga	0	0	1	0	0	0	0	0	1	0
Barcelona	Total		291	0	29	0	93	0	10	0	423	0
Girona (loan)	2025–26	La Liga	2	0	—		—		—		2	0
Ajax (loan)	2026–27	Eredivisie	11	0	0	0	5 (Note: Appearances in UEFA Conference League)	0	—		16	0
Career total			430	0	37	0	107	0	12	0	586	0

=== International ===
As of match played 16 November 2026

Appearances and goals by national team and year
National team	Year	Apps	Goals
Germany
Germany	2012	2	0
Germany	2013	1	0
Germany	2014	1	0
Germany	2015	0	0
Germany	2016	4	0
Germany	2017	10	0
Germany	2018	3	0
Germany	2019	3	0
Germany	2020	0	0
Germany	2021	3	0
Germany	2022	3	0
Germany	2023	8	0
Germany	2024	4	0
Germany	2025	2	0
Germany	2026	3	0
Total		47	0

== Honours ==
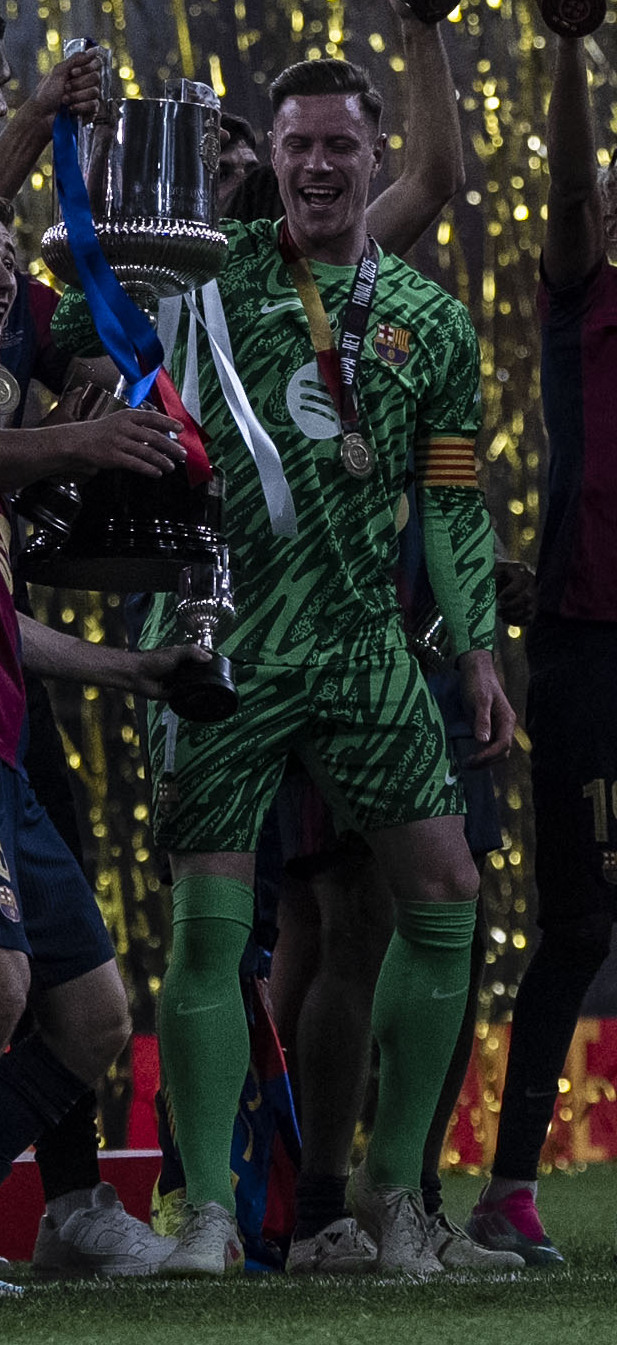
Ter Stegen celebration after winning with Barcelona in the 2025 Copa del Rey final

Barcelona

- La Liga: 2014–15, 2015–16, 2017–18, 2018–19, 2022–23, 2024–25, 2025–26
- Copa del Rey: 2014–15, 2015–16, 2016–17, 2017–18, 2020–21, 2024–25
- Supercopa de España: 2018, 2023, 2025, 2026
- UEFA Champions League: 2014–15
- UEFA Super Cup: 2015
- FIFA Club World Cup: 2015

Germany U17

- UEFA European Under-17 Championship: 2009

Germany

- FIFA Confederations Cup: 2017

Individual

- UEFA European Under-17 Championship Team of the Tournament: 2009
- Fritz Walter Medal U17 Bronze: 2009
- Fritz Walter Medal U19 Gold: 2011
- kicker Goalkeeper of the Year: 2012
- UEFA Champions League Squad of the Season: 2014–15, 2018–19
- UEFA Save of the Season: 2014–15
- UEFA Fans' Team of the Year: 2018
- ESM Team of the Year: 2017–18, 2018–19, 2019–20, 2022–23
- La Liga Zamora Trophy: 2022–23
- La Liga Team of the Season: 2022–23
- La Liga Player of the Season: 2022–23
- Premi Barça Jugadors: 2018–19, 2022–23
- Trofeo Aldo Rovira: 2019–20, 2022–23
