= Sergi Roberto =

Spanish footballer (born 1992)

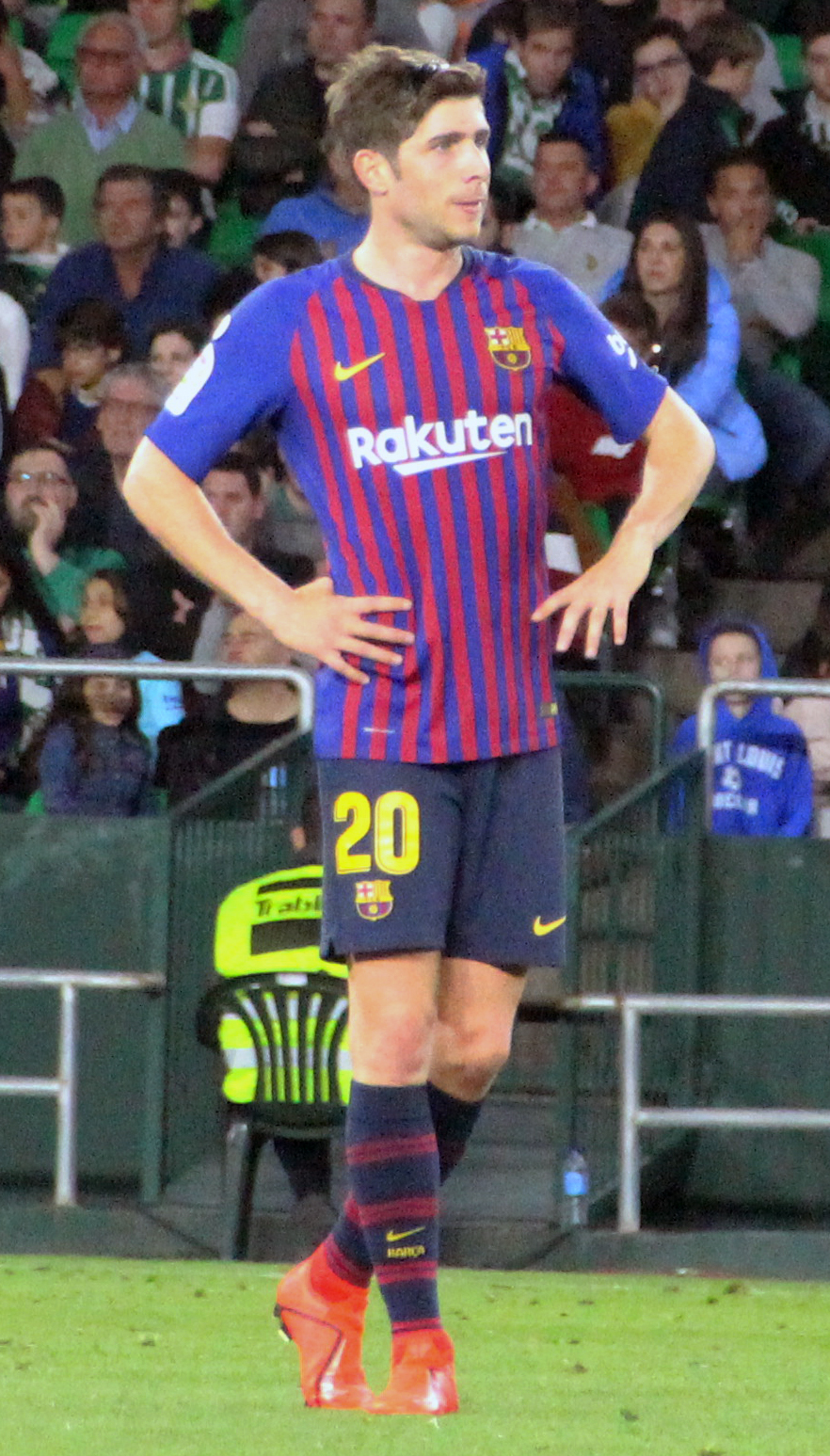
- Roberto with Barcelona in 2019

Personal information
- Full name: Sergi Roberto Carnicer
- Date of birth: 7 February 1992 (age 34)
- Place of birth: Reus, Spain
- Height: 1.78 m (5 ft 10 in)
- Positions: Midfielder; full-back

Team information
- Current team: LA Galaxy
- Number: 6

Youth career
- 2000–2004: Santes Creus
- 2004–2006: Gimnàstic
- 2006–2009: Barcelona

Senior career*
Years	Team	Apps	(Gls)
2009–2013	Barcelona B	106	(7)
2010–2024	Barcelona	245	(12)
2024–2026	Como	33	(0)
2026–	LA Galaxy	11	(1)

International career
2008–2009	Spain U17	11	(3)
2010–2011	Spain U19	9	(0)
2011	Spain U20	5	(1)
2011–2014	Spain U21	14	(2)
2016–2021	Spain	11	(1)
2011–2016	Catalonia	6	(0)
Medal record
Men's football
Representing Spain
UEFA Nations League
Runner-up	2021 Italy
FIFA U-17 World Cup
Third place	2009 Nigeria	Team
- * Club domestic league appearances and goals as of 03:05, 8 November 2026 (UTC)

Sergi Roberto Carnicer (Catalan pronunciation: [ˈsɛɾʒi ruˈβɛɾtu kəɾniˈse], born 7 February 1992) is a Spanish professional footballer who plays for Major League Soccer club LA Galaxy. Mainly a central midfielder, he can also operate as a defensive midfielder, full-back or winger.

He spent most of his career with Barcelona after making his first-team debut at the age of 18, going on to win several accolades with the club including seven La Liga championships and two Champions Leagues. In August 2024, he signed for Serie A side Como.

Roberto made his first full appearance for Spain in 2016.

== Club career ==
=== Barcelona ===
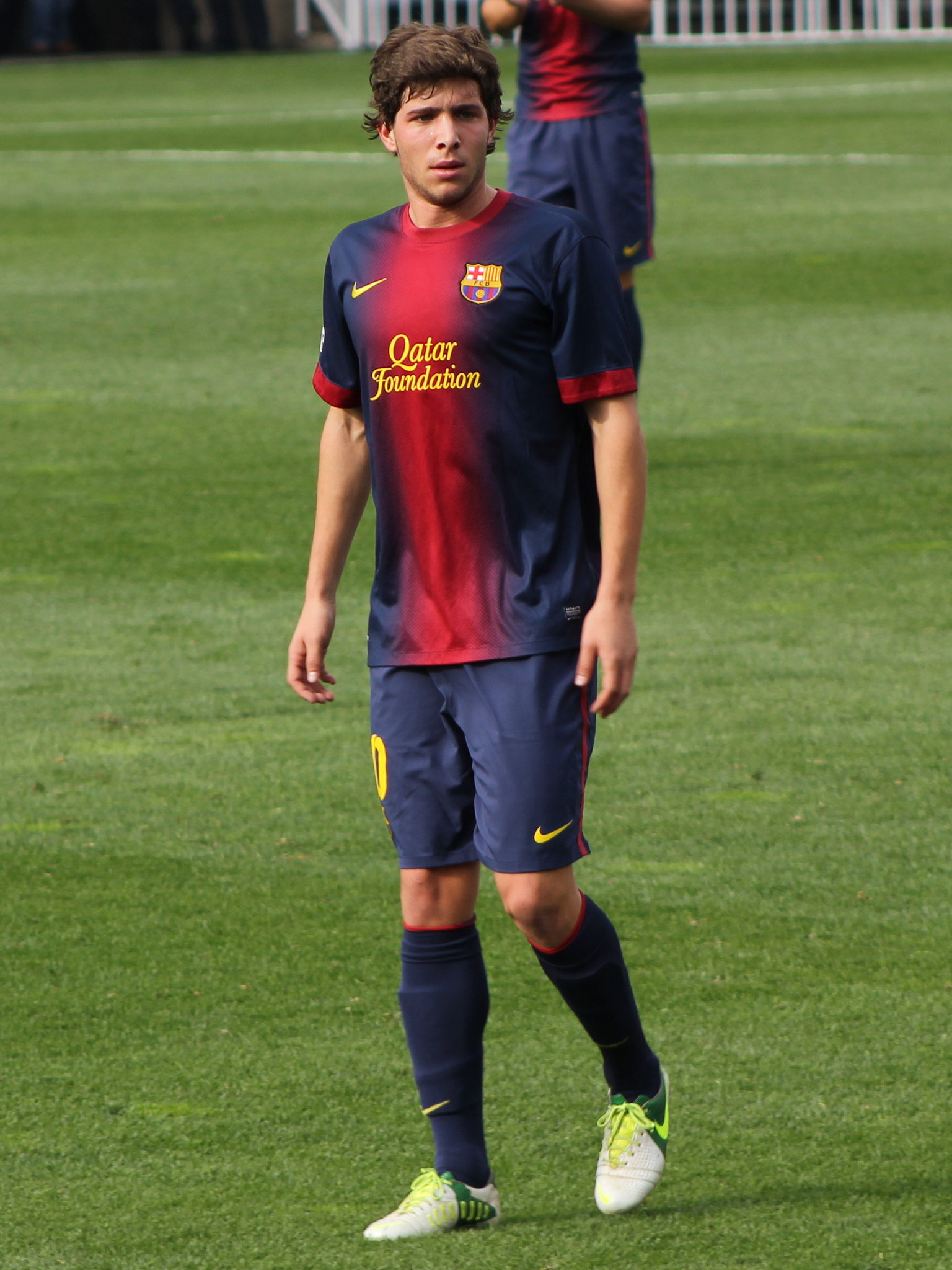
Roberto with Barcelona B in 2012

Born in Reus, Tarragona, Catalonia, Roberto began playing football with local UE Barri Santes Creus at the age of 8, arriving in Barcelona's youth academy six years later from neighbours Gimnàstic de Tarragona. In the 2009–10 season, at only 17, he first appeared with Barça's reserves, contributing 29 appearances as they returned to the Segunda División after 11 years.

On 10 November 2010, Roberto made his debut for the first team, playing the second half of a 5–1 home win against Ceuta in the round of 32 of the Copa del Rey (7–1 on aggregate). On 27 April of the following year he made his first UEFA Champions League appearance, coming on as a substitute for David Villa in the last minute of a 2–0 away victory over Real Madrid in the competition semi-finals' first leg.

Roberto first appeared in La Liga on 21 May 2011, playing the full 90 minutes in a 3–1 win at Málaga in the season's last round. His first start for the main squad came on 6 December of that year, against BATE Borisov in the Champions League group stage, as manager Pep Guardiola rested all his starters for the upcoming El Clásico: in the 35th minute, he opened the scoring in an eventual 4–0 home win.

In only his third official appearance for Barcelona's first team, on 12 January 2012, Roberto scored his second goal, helping the visitors come from behind to win 2–1 against Osasuna in the domestic cup (6–1 on aggregate). On 16 December 2014, also in that competition, he netted another, contributing to an 8–1 demolition of Huesca at the Camp Nou.

In the 2015–16 season, after being reconverted by manager Luis Enrique and merely months after nearly being deemed surplus to requirements, Roberto appeared as a right-back in several games. In two consecutive matches against Athletic Bilbao in January 2016, one in the league and another in the Spanish Cup, he featured on the other flank in the place of injured Jordi Alba, going on to play in as many as seven different positions.

On 20 August 2016, Roberto started as a right-back and provided two assists in a 6–2 home defeat of Betis in the opening match of the campaign. On 24 September, from the same position, he again contributed two decisive passes in a 5–0 away rout of Sporting de Gijón.

On 8 March 2017, Roberto scored the final goal in the 95th minute as part of a decisive 6–1 home victory against Paris Saint-Germain in the second leg of the Champions League round-of-16, making Barcelona the first club to overcome a four-goal deficit in the competition. On 22 February 2018, he extended his contract until 2022.

In injury time of the first half of the fixture with Real Madrid on 6 May 2018, Roberto was shown a straight red card after punching Marcelo, in an eventual 2–2 home draw. He was first choice right-back during the season ahead of newly signed Nélson Semedo, and his side won the national championship after a one-year wait.

Roberto suffered a quadriceps strain injury in late October 2021 and was successfully operated in December by surgeon Lasse Lempainen in Turku, Finland. On 3 March 2023, he agreed to an extension until 2024. In spite of dealing with several physical problems, he scored a career-best four goals for the league champions.

At the start of 2023–24, Roberto was appointed team captain alongside Ronald Araújo, Frenkie de Jong and Marc-André ter Stegen. On 30 June 2024, with 373 competitive appearances to his credit, he left Barcelona as a free agent.

=== Como ===
On 23 August 2024, Roberto signed for Serie A club Como on a two-year deal. On 24 September, as the newly promoted side, coached by his former Barcelona teammate Cesc Fàbregas, won 3–2 at Atalanta, he assisted Gabriel Strefezza in the first goal after backheeling a pass from Ignace Van Der Brempt.

Roberto scored his only goal on 27 January 2026, when he equalised an eventual 3–1 away victory over Fiorentina in the round of 16 of the Coppa Italia. He contributed 20 games (24 in all competitions) during the season, helping his team to qualify for the Champions League after finishing a best-ever fourth; the 34-year-old left in June upon the expiration of his contract.

=== LA Galaxy ===
On 8 August 2026, Roberto joined LA Galaxy of Major League Soccer on a free transfer, signing a contract through 2028 with an option to extend for an additional season.

== International career ==
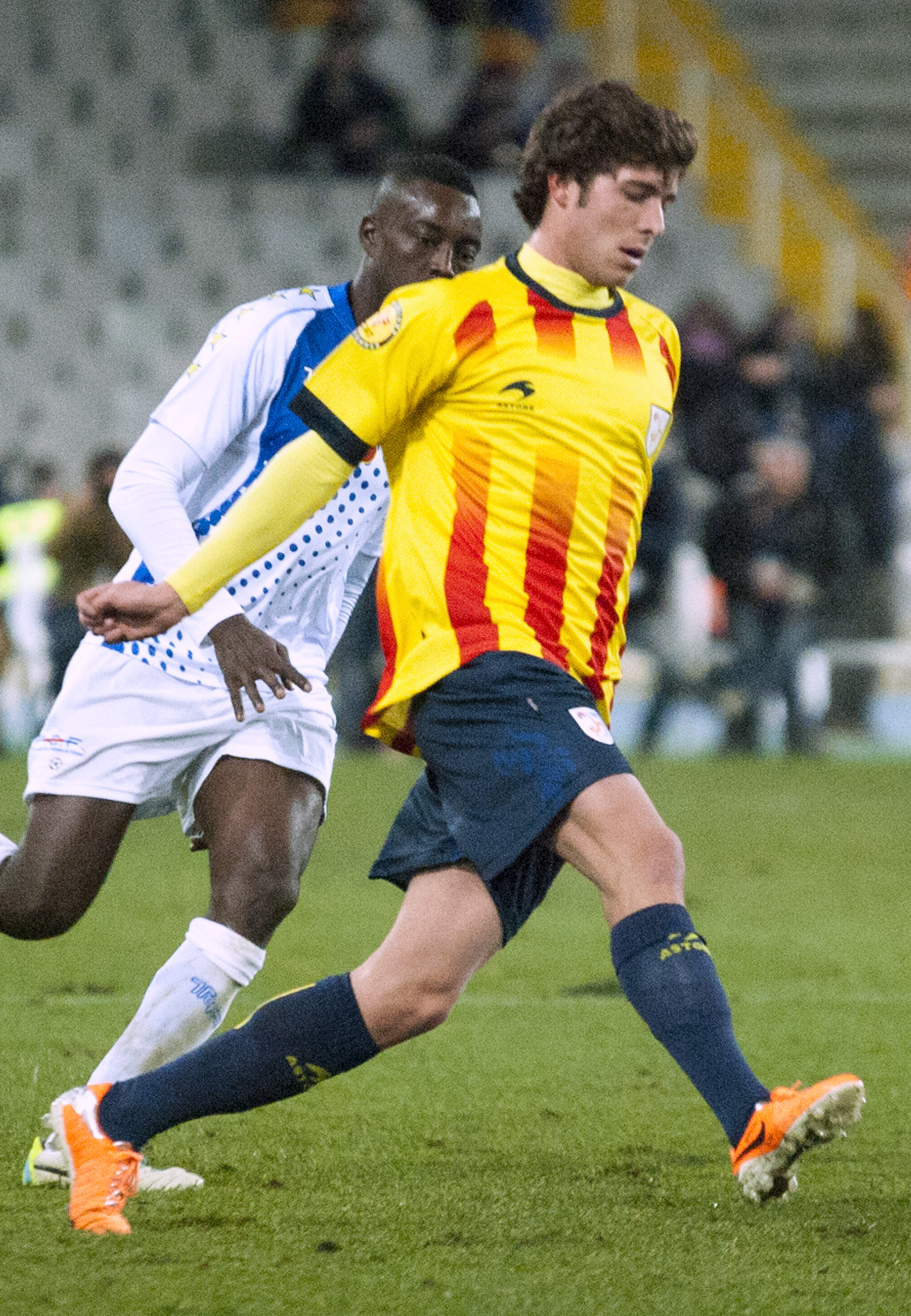
Roberto playing for Catalonia against Cape Verde in 2013

In October 2009, shortly after making his Barcelona B debut, Roberto was called by the Spain under-17 team for the 2009 FIFA World Cup in Nigeria. On 5 November, before being substituted by Javier Espinosa in the 88th minute, he scored a hat-trick against Burkina Faso at the Sani Abacha Stadium in Kano. Spain eventually finished third in the tournament, with him and Atlético Madrid's Borja Bastón accounting for eight of the team's total goals.

Roberto made his debut for the under-21 side on 5 September 2011, playing the last four minutes of the 2–0 win in Lugo over Georgia for the 2013 UEFA European Under-21 Championship qualifiers. He received his first call up to the senior squad in March 2016, for friendlies against Romania and Italy. His debut took place in the former match on the 27th, as he started in a 0–0 draw in Cluj-Napoca.

Roberto was selected by Luis Enrique to the 2021 UEFA Nations League Finals. He featured in the 2–1 semi-final win over Italy for the runners-up.

== Style of play ==
Roberto plays predominantly as a midfielder, but also excels as a full-back. In the 2015–16 season, under Luis Enrique, he played in seven different positions with Barcelona. This versatility, combined with his pace, strength, rigorous work rate and accurate passing earned the praise of the manager: "In a team like ours, except in goal, he could play in any position, it's no surprise. The most difficult thing is doing it well all over the field and Sergi Roberto does that." He is best utilised as a box-to-box player.

== Personal life ==
In 2014, Roberto started dating Israeli model Coral Simanovich (step-daughter of Israeli businesswoman Pnina Rosenblum). They became engaged in early September 2017, and got married in Tel Aviv on 30 May 2018. Their first child, Kaia, was born in 2019.

== Career statistics ==
=== Club ===
As of match played 7 November 2026

Appearances and goals by club, season and competition
Club	Season	League			National cup (Note: Includes Copa del Rey, Coppa Italia)		Continental		Other		Total	
Club	Season	Division	Apps	Goals	Apps	Goals	Apps	Goals	Apps	Goals	Apps	Goals
Barcelona B	2009–10	Segunda División B	29	0	—		—		—		29	0
Barcelona B	2010–11	Segunda División	26	2	—		—		—		26	2
Barcelona B	2011–12	Segunda División	28	4	—		—		—		28	4
Barcelona B	2012–13	Segunda División	23	1	—		—		—		23	1
Barcelona B	Total		106	7	—		—		—		106	7
Barcelona	2010–11	La Liga	1	0	1	0	1 (Note: Appearance(s) in UEFA Champions League)	0	0	0	3	0
Barcelona	2011–12	La Liga	1	0	2	1	1	1	0	0	4	2
Barcelona	2012–13	La Liga	1	0	3	0	1	0	0	0	5	0
Barcelona	2013–14	La Liga	17	0	6	0	4	0	0	0	27	0
Barcelona	2014–15	La Liga	12	0	4	2	2	0	—		18	2
Barcelona	2015–16	La Liga	31	0	6	0	8	1	4 (Note: One appearance in UEFA Super Cup, one appearance in Supercopa de España, one appearance in FIFA Club World Cup)	0	49	1
Barcelona	2016–17	La Liga	32	0	6	0	8	1	1 (Note: Appearances in Supercopa de España)	0	47	1
Barcelona	2017–18	La Liga	30	1	8	0	8	0	2	0	48	1
Barcelona	2018–19	La Liga	29	0	6	1	9	0	0	0	44	1
Barcelona	2019–20	La Liga	30	1	2	0	6	0	1	0	39	1
Barcelona	2020–21	La Liga	15	1	2	0	3	0	0	0	20	1
Barcelona	2021–22	La Liga	9	2	0	0	3	0	0	0	12	2
Barcelona	2022–23	La Liga	23	4	3	0	5 (Note: Three appearances in UEFA Champions League, two appearances in UEFA Europa League)	0	2	0	33	4
Barcelona	2023–24	La Liga	14	3	3	0	5	0	2	0	24	3
Barcelona	Total		245	12	52	4	64	3	12	0	373	19
Como	2024–25	Serie A	13	0	0	0	—		—		13	0
Como	2025–26	Serie A	20	0	4	1	—		—		24	1
Como	Total		33	0	4	1	—		—		37	1
LA Galaxy	2026	Major League Soccer	11	1	—		—		—		11	1
Career total			395	20	56	5	64	3	12	0	527	28

=== International ===
Appearances and goals by national team and year
National team	Year	Apps	Goals
Spain
Spain	2016	3	1
Spain	2017	0	0
Spain	2018	2	0
Spain	2019	2	0
Spain	2020	3	0
Spain	2021	1	0
Total		11	1

Scores and results list Spain's goal tally first, score column indicates score after each Roberto goal.

List of international goals scored by Sergi Roberto
No.	Date	Venue	Opponent	Score	Result	Competition
1	5 September 2016	Estadio Reino de León, León, Spain	Liechtenstein	2–0	8–0	2018 FIFA World Cup qualification

== Honours ==
Barcelona

- La Liga: 2010–11, 2012–13, 2014–15, 2015–16, 2017–18, 2018–19, 2022–23
- Copa del Rey: 2011–12, 2014–15, 2015–16, 2016–17, 2017–18, 2020–21
- Supercopa de España: 2010, 2016, 2023
- UEFA Champions League: 2010–11, 2014–15
- UEFA Super Cup: 2015
- FIFA Club World Cup: 2015

Spain U17

- FIFA U-17 World Cup third place: 2009

Spain

- UEFA Nations League runner-up: 2020–21

Individual

- Premi Barça Jugadors: 2016–17
- UEFA Champions League Breakthrough XI: 2016
- Catalan Footballer of the Year: 2016–17
