= 2016–17 FC Barcelona season =

118th season in existence of FC Barcelona

Barcelona
2016–17 season
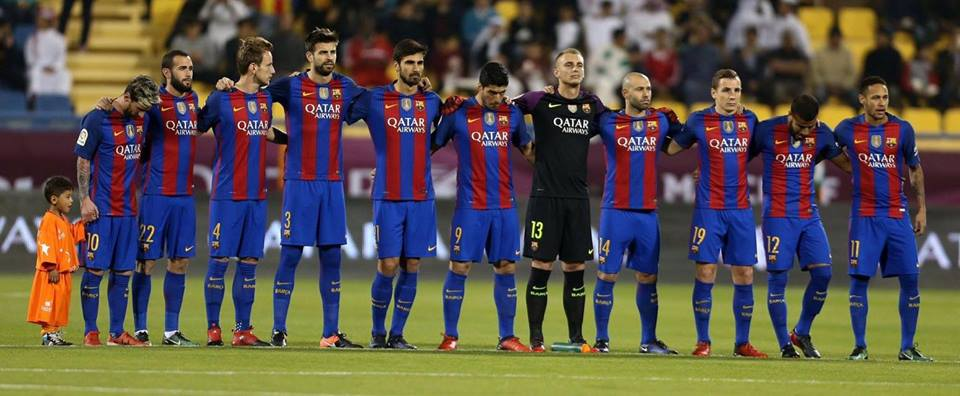
- Barcelona players during the Save the Dream match in December 2016
- President: Josep Maria Bartomeu
- Head Coach: Luis Enrique
- Stadium: Camp Nou
- La Liga: 2nd
- Copa del Rey: Winners
- Supercopa de España: Winners
- UEFA Champions League: Quarter-finals
- Top goalscorer: League: Lionel Messi (37); All: Lionel Messi (54)
- Highest home attendance: 98,485 vs Real Madrid (3 December 2016)
- Lowest home attendance: 56,605 vs Sporting Gijón (1 March 2017)
- Average home league attendance: 77,984
| Home colours | Away colours | Third colours |

The 2016–17 season was Futbol Club Barcelona's 118th in existence and the club's 86th consecutive season in the top flight of Spanish football. Barcelona was involved in four competitions after winning the double of La Liga and the Copa del Rey in the previous season. This would be the final season under head coach Luis Enrique as he decided to let his contract expire.

Barcelona kicked off the season with en emphatic 5–0 aggregate victory over Sevilla in the Supercopa de España, but the rest of the season was more mixed. The most memorable highlights were the historic 6–1 comeback win against Paris Saint-Germain in the return leg of the Champions League round of 16, overturning the heavy 0–4 away defeat, and the 3–2 last-minute away league victory in El Clásico over Real Madrid on 23 April, courtesy of a Lionel Messi strike. However, these performances did not yield trophies in the aforementioned competitions, as Barça was shut down by Juventus in the Champions League quarter-finals (0–3 away, 0–0 home) and lost the league title to Real Madrid by three points. The only consolation was a third consecutive Copa del Rey win on 27 May against Alavés.

The season was the first without Dani Alves since 2007–08, who departed to Juventus, though he returned for a second spell in the 2021–22 season.

== Kit ==
| Home | Home alt. | Away | Away alt. | Third | Goalkeeper 1 | Goalkeeper 2 | Goalkeeper 3 |

== Season overview ==
=== June ===
On 1 June, the club announced that Sandro Ramírez's contract would be rescinded.

On 2 June, Barcelona announced that Dani Alves would be departing the club after eight seasons.

On 3 June, Barcelona announced that German club Borussia Dortmund have informed them of their desire to activate the buy-out clause for Marc Bartra.

On 5 June, the club announced that Denis Suárez will be forming part of the first team for this season.

=== July ===
On 1 July, Barcelona and Neymar negotiated a five-year contract extension lasting until 30 June 2021.

On 4 July, the club completed the transfer of Denis Suárez.

On 12 July, the club announced the transfers of 22-year-old French international defender Samuel Umtiti from Lyon and Lucas Digne from Paris Saint-Germain for the next five seasons, respectively.

On 14 July, the two transfers were completed.

On 19 July, Barcelona and Sergi Samper negotiated a three-year contract extension lasting until 30 June 2019, including promotion to the first team.

On 19 July, Barcelona and Munir El Haddadi also negotiated a three-year contract extension lasting until 30 June 2019.

On 19 July, Barcelona and Qatar Airways extended sponsorship agreement for one year more.

On 21 July, Barcelona and Valencia reached an agreement for the transfer of Portuguese international midfielder André Gomes. On 26 July, the transfer was completed.

During the press conference of Gomes' presentation, the club announced midfielder Javier Mascherano's contract was extended until 30 June 2019.

On 30 July, Barcelona won their first pre-season match against Scottish champions Celtic with a 1–3 score in Dublin as part of the 2016 International Champions Cup.

=== August ===
On 1 August, the club cancelled the contracts of Alex Song and Martín Montoya.

On 3 August, Barcelona defeated English Premier League champions Leicester City 4–2 in Stockholm with goals from Munir (2), Luis Suárez and Barcelona B player Rafa Mújica.

On 6 August, Barcelona were soundly defeated by Liverpool 4–0 at Wembley Stadium in London.

On 8 August, the club loaned Thomas Vermaelen to Italian club Roma with an option to buy.

On 10 August, the 2016 Joan Gamper Trophy was played against Italian club Sampdoria, finishing 3–2 with a goal from Luis Suárez and two from Lionel Messi.

On 14 August, Barcelona won the first official match in the 2016 Supercopa de España against Sevilla with a 0–2 away score.

On 18 August, Barcelona beat Sevilla with 3–0 (5–0 aggregate) and won their 12th Supercopa de España.

On 20 August, Barcelona defeated Real Betis 6–2 in their first Liga match, with a hat-trick from Luis Suárez, two goals from Messi and one from Arda Turan.

On 25 August, the club completed the transfer of 27-year-old goalkeeper Jasper Cillessen from Ajax on a five-year contract, with goalkeeper Claudio Bravo then joining Manchester City after two years with Barça. Several hours later, both teams were drawn into Group C of the Champions League draw, alongside Borussia Mönchengladbach and Celtic.

On 28 August, Barcelona defeated Athletic Bilbao 0–1 with a goal from Rakitić and Luis Enrique wins his 100th match as Barça manager, Ter Stegen made most goalkeeper passes in one single match in LaLiga.

On 30 August, the club completed the last transfer of Paco Alcácer from Valencia.

=== September ===
On 10 September, in the match against Deportivo Alavés, Barcelona suffered a 1–2 defeat.

On 13 September, Barcelona defeated Celtic 7–0 in the opening match of Group C in the Champions League. Messi notched his first hat-trick of the season, while Neymar provided four assists and a free-kick goal.

On 17 September, Barcelona faced for the first time recently promoted Leganés at the Estadio Municipal de Butarque. Barcelona won 1–5 with two goals from Messi and one each from Luis Suárez, Neymar and Rafinha.

On 21 September, Barcelona drew against Atlético Madrid 1–1; Ivan Rakitić gave Barça the lead before half-time, but Atlético battled back to draw level in the second half after Messi was substituted out due to injury.

On 24 September, Barcelona won 0–5 over Sporting de Gijón through two goals from Neymar and one each from Suárez, Turan and Rafinha.

On 28 September, Barcelona defeated Borussia Mönchengladbach 1–2 with goals from Turan and Gerard Piqué, turning around a 1–0 first-half deficit to Barça top of Group C.

=== October ===
On 2 October, Barcelona lost to Celta de Vigo 4–3; a second-half resurgence not enough for Luis Enrique's side as they finished on the wrong end of a seven-goal thriller away in Vigo.

On 15 October, Barcelona defeated Deportivo de La Coruña 4–0 with two goals from Rafinha and one each from Luis Suárez and Messi, the latter who returned from injury in the match.

On 19 October, Barcelona defeated Manchester City – led by former Barça manager Pep Guardiola – 4–0 at home on the strength of a Messi hat-trick.

On 22 October, Barcelona defeated Valencia 2–3 at Mestalla, Messi spot-kick in injury time secured three points out of an electrifying encounter.

On 29 October, Barcelona won against Granada 1–0 in the 1,500th game at Camp Nou, Barça found it tough to breakdown the stubborn visitors but Rafinha's strike was enough to claim the win.

=== November ===
On 1 November, Barcelona was defeated by Manchester City 3–1 at Manchester, Guardiola's team came from behind after Messi opened scoring.

On 6 November, Barcelona won 1–2 against Sevilla at the Sánchez Pizjuán; Messi canceled out Vitolo's opener late in the first half before setting up Luis Suárez for the winner in a frenetic game.

On 16 November, the club announced Rakuten signed up as FC Barcelona's new main global partner; the Japanese company will appear on the front of the team's shirt and become the Global Innovation and Entertainment Partner for the next four seasons, starting 1 July 2017.

On 19 November, Barça drew Málaga 0–0, a domineering performance was frustrated by 90 minutes of intense Andalusian defending.

On 23 November, Barcelona won 2–0 against Celtic at Celtic Park; coupled with Man City's draw in Germany, they clinched a seeded berth in the round of sixteen. Also in this game Messi reached 100 goals in international competitions for Barcelona.

On 27 November, Barcelona drew 1–1 with Real Sociedad at Anoeta, Messi's second-half leveller halted Barça's run of four straight league losses in San Sebastian.

On 30 November, Barcelona drew Hércules 1–1, a fine long range strike from debutant Aleña gave Barça a slight advantage going into the second leg.

=== December ===
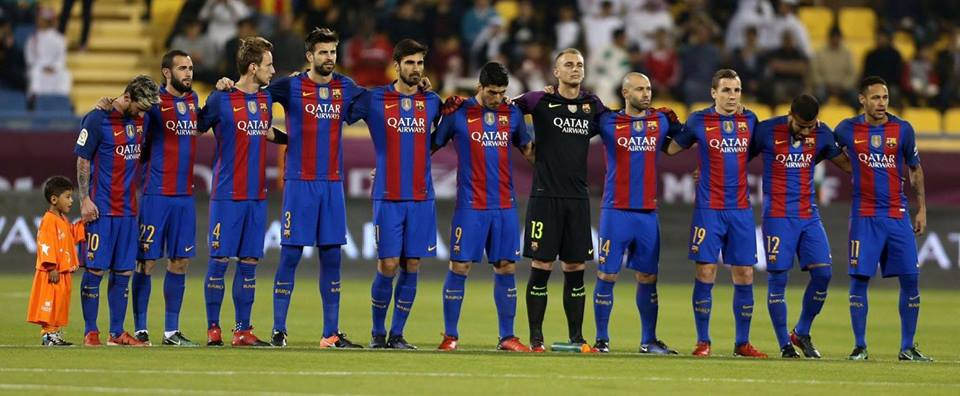
2016–17 FC Barcelona at the Match of Champions

On 3 December, Barcelona drew 1–1 with Real Madrid, Luis Suárez' header being cancelled out by 90th minute Ramos equaliser.

On 6 December, Barcelona won 4–0 against Borussia Mönchengladbach, a game which saw a hat-trick from Arda Turan.

On 10 December, Barcelona won Osasuna 0–3, Luis Suárez breaks the deadlock in the second half, and two further goals from Leo Messi go on to claim all three points in Pamplona.

On 12 December, Barcelona were drawn against Paris Saint-Germain in the round of 16 of the Champions League.

On 15 December, Barcelona and Suárez negotiated a five-year contract extension lasting until 30 June 2021.

On 18 December, Barcelona won 4–1 against Espanyol in the Derbi barceloní.

On 21 December, Barcelona won 7–0 against Hércules; Paco Alcácer scored his first official goal and Arda Turan got a hat-trick as Barça cruised into the last 16 of the Copa del Rey.

On 23 December, Barcelona was drawn against Athletic Club in the round of 16 of the Copa del Rey.

=== January ===
On 8 January Barcelona drew 1–1 with Villarreal, with Messi scoring the equalizer in the 90th minute.

On 11 January, Barcelona won 3–1 against Athletic Bilbao, goals from Suárez, Neymar and Messi secured an action-packed victory that kept alive the quest for a third consecutive Copa del Rey trophy.

On 14 January, Barcelona won 5–0 against Las Palmas, a brace from Luis Suárez and one each for Leo Messi, Arda Turan and Aleix Vidal gave Barça a winning home start to the league in 2017.

On 19 January Barcelona won 0–1 against Real Sociedad, Neymar's 21st-minute penalty ended decade of disappointments in San Sebastián.

On 22 January, Barcelona won 0–4 against Eibar, a first-half strike from Denis followed by a goal each from the trident in the second secured another three points to stay within reach of the top two.

On 26 January, Barcelona won 5–2 against Real Sociedad, a brace from Denis Suárez and further goals by Leo Messi, Luis Suárez and Arda Turan sent Barça into the final four of the Copa del Rey.

On 29 January Barcelona drew 1–1 with Real Betis, an incident-packed game saw Suárez snatched a draw in the 90th minute after the Catalans had already seen at least one valid equaliser overruled.

=== February ===
On 1 February, Barcelona won 2–1 against Atlético Madrid, Suárez and Messi put them in command but Griezmann's second half header kept Atlético alive.

On 4 February, Barcelona won 3–0 against Athletic Club Bilbao, Paco Alcácer, Leo Messi, and Aleix Vidal all found the net.

On 7 February, Barcelona draw 1–1 against Atlético Madrid, Luis Suárez's tap-in just before half-time was enough to see the Catalans into a fourth consecutive Copa del Rey final despite late drama which saw the visitors equalise and a player sent off.

On 11 February, Barcelona won 6–0 against Alavés. Luis Suárez (2), Neymar Jr, Leo Messi and Ivan Rakitic were on target, plus one own goal; Aleix Vidal suffered a very serious ankle injury late in the game.

On 14 February, Barcelona lost 4–0 against Paris Saint-Germain in the first leg of the first knockout round of the Champions League.

On 19 February, Barcelona won 2–1 against Leganés, Leo Messi's 90th-minute penalty won the game at the Camp Nou.

On 26 February, Barcelona won 2–1 against Atlético Madrid, Rafinha's opener was quickly cancelled out by Godín's header but Messi sealed three points in the closing stages.

=== March ===
On 1 March, Barcelona won 6–1 against Sporting Gijón, with goals from Messi, Suárez, Alcácer, Neymar Jr, Rakitić and an own goal at the Camp Nou. During the press conference after the match, Luis Enrique announced his decision to leave at the end of the season.

On 4 March, Barcelona won 5–0 against Celta, with goals from Messi (2), Neymar, Rakitic and Umtiti.

On 8 March, Barça came back from a 4–0 deficit in the first leg. In the second leg, they were up 3–1, but by way of scoring three goals in the last seven minutes, they advanced. Marc-Andre Ter Stegen's saves coupled with Neymar's brace and Sergi Roberto's goal at the death clinched the 6–5 aggregate win in what was hailed as one of the greatest comebacks in Champions League history.

On 9 March, Barcelona and Rakitic negotiated a four-year contract extension lasting until 30 June 2021.

On 12 March, Barcelona lost to Deportivo la Coruña 2–1, two goals from corners condemned Barça to defeat in Galicia, with Luis Suárez scoring in between.

On 17 March, Barcelona were drawn against Juventus in the quarter finals of the Champions League.

On 19 March, Barcelona won 4–2 against Valencia, with goals from Suárez, André Gomes and a brace from Messi.

=== April ===
Barcelona defeated Granada on 2 April 1–4 away, goals from Suárez, Alcácer, Rakitic and Neymar handed Barça another three points to keep in close proximity of the top.

On 5 April, Barcelona defeated Sevilla 3–0, with a goal from Suárez and two from Messi in 8 minutes.

On 8 April, Barcelona lost to Málaga 2–0, ten-man Barça missed out on the chance to return to the top of the table.

On 11 April, Barcelona lost to Juventus 3–0, Barça could not break through Juve's rock-solid defense.

On 15 April, Barcelona beat Real Sociedad 3–2, Barça edged past La Real in a hard-fought duel thanked to two goals from Leo Messi and one from Paco Alcácer.

On 19 April, Barcelona drew 0–0 with Juventus, Barça bade farewell to the Champions League after being unable to break down a resilient Juve backline.

On 23 April, Barcelona beat Real Madrid 3–2, Barça grabbed a dramatic victory at the Santiago Bernabéu thanks to an injury-time strike from Leo Messi to move joint-top of the table. The Argentine star scored his 500th official goal in blaugrana colours at the same time.

On 26 April, Barcelona beat Osasuna 7–1, braces for Gomes, Messi and Alcácer, and a first ever Barça goal for Mascherano, earned the points.

On 29 April, Barcelona beat Espanyol 3–0, all goals after half time, including a Suárez brace and one from Rakitic, to stay top of the table.

=== May ===
On 6 May, Barcelona beat Villarreal 4–1, Messi, Suarez and Neymar all scored to keep the Liga title challenge alive, in the process surpassing a combined 100 goals for a third consecutive season.

On 14 May, Barcelona beat Las Palmas 4–1, Neymar Jr scored three of the four goals that meant the championship race would now go to the last weekend.

On 21 May, Barcelona won Eibar 4–2, Luis Enrique's men rally back from two goals down to claim victory on the final day of the league campaign but it was not enough to earn the title.

On 27 May, Barcelona won Alavés 3–1, Barça become the first side since the 1950s to win the Copa del Rey three years in a row, on Luis Enrique's last game in charge.

On 29 May, Barcelona and Ter Stegen negotiated a five-year contract extension lasting until 30 June 2022.

== Players ==
=== Squad information ===
| N | Pos. | Nat. | Name | Age | EU | Since | App | Goals | Ends | Transfer fee | Notes |
|---|---|---|---|---|---|---|---|---|---|---|---|
| 1 | GK | (Germany) | Marc-André ter Stegen | 25 | EU | 2014 | 93 | 0 | 2022 | €12M | |
| 3 | CB | (Spain) | Gerard Piqué | 30 | EU | 2008 | 397 | 35 | 2019 | €5M | Originally from Youth system |
| 4 | MF | (Croatia) | Ivan Rakitić | 29 | EU | 2014 | 159 | 26 | 2021 | €20M | |
| 5 | MF | (Spain) | Sergio Busquets (3rd captain) | 28 | EU | 2008 | 432 | 12 | 2021 | YS | |
| 6 | MF | (Spain) | Denis Suárez | 23 | EU | 2016 | 36 | 4 | 2020 | €3.25M | |
| 7 | MF | (Turkey) | Arda Turan | 30 | Non-EU | 2015 | 55 | 15 | 2019 | €34M | |
| 8 | MF | (Spain) | Andrés Iniesta (captain) | 33 | EU | 2002 | 630 | 55 | 2018 | YS | |
| 9 | FW | (Uruguay) | Luis Suárez | 30 | Non-EU | 2014 | 147 | 121 | 2021 | €82.3M | Second nationality: Italy |
| 10 | FW | (Argentina) | Lionel Messi (vice-captain) | 29 | EU | 2004 | 583 | 507 | 2018 | YS | Second nationality: Spain |
| 11 | FW | (Brazil) | Neymar | 25 | Non-EU | 2013 | 186 | 105 | 2021 | €57.1M | Second nationality: Portugal |
| 12 | MF | (Brazil) | Rafinha | 24 | EU | 2011 | 78 | 11 | 2020 | YS | Second nationality: Spain |
| 13 | GK | (Netherlands) | Jasper Cillessen | 28 | EU | 2016 | 10 | 0 | 2021 | €13M | |
| 14 | CB | (Argentina) | Javier Mascherano (4th captain) | 32 | EU | 2010 | 322 | 1 | 2019 | €22M | Second nationality: Italy |
| 17 | FW | (Spain) | Paco Alcácer | 23 | EU | 2016 | 28 | 8 | 2021 | €28M | |
| 18 | LB | (Spain) | Jordi Alba | 28 | EU | 2012 | 198 | 9 | 2020 | €14M | Originally from Youth system |
| 19 | LB | (France) | Lucas Digne | 23 | EU | 2016 | 26 | 1 | 2021 | €16.5M | |
| 20 | RB | (Spain) | Sergi Roberto | 25 | EU | 2010 | 153 | 6 | 2019 | YS | |
| 21 | MF | (Portugal) | André Gomes | 23 | EU | 2016 | 47 | 3 | 2021 | €50M | |
| 22 | RB | (Spain) | Aleix Vidal | 27 | EU | 2015 | 26 | 2 | 2020 | €14.8M | Originally from Youth system |
| 23 | CB | (France) | Samuel Umtiti | 23 | EU | 2016 | 43 | 1 | 2021 | €25M | |
| 24 | CB | (France) | Jérémy Mathieu | 33 | EU | 2014 | 88 | 4 | 2018 | €23M | |
| 25 | GK | (Spain) | Jordi Masip | 28 | EU | 2014 | 4 | 0 | 2017 | YS | |

- Last updated: 27 May 2017
- Source: FCBarcelona.com, Champions League 2016/17 numbers, Players in / out, Wikipedia players' articles, ESPN (for appearances and goals) and footballdatabase.com (for EU passport)

==== From youth squad ====
Note: Flags indicate national team as defined under FIFA eligibility rules; some limited exceptions apply. Players may hold more than one non-FIFA nationality.

| No. | Pos. | Nation | Player |
|---|---|---|---|
| 26 | GK | ESP | José Aurelio Suárez |
| 27 | MF | CMR | Wilfrid Kaptoum |
| 28 | MF | ESP | Carles Aleñá |
| 29 | FW | ESP | Marc Cardona |
| 30 | MF | ESP | Álex Carbonell |

| No. | Pos. | Nation | Player |
|---|---|---|---|
| 31 | DF | ESP | Borja López |
| 32 | DF | ESP | Nili |
| 33 | DF | BRA | Marlon Santos |
| 34 | DF | ESP | Sergi Palencia |

=== Players in ===
| No. | Pos. | Nat. | Name | Age | EU | Moving from | Type | Transfer window | Ends | Transfer fee | Source |
|---|---|---|---|---|---|---|---|---|---|---|---|
| 6 | MF | (Spain) | Denis Suárez | 22 | EU | (Spain) Villarreal | Buyback clause | Summer | 2020 | €3.25M | FCBarcelona.com |
| — | RB | (Spain) | Martín Montoya | 25 | EU | (Spain) Real Betis | Loan return | Summer | 2020 | Free | FCBarcelona.com |
| 30 | MF | (Croatia) | Alen Halilović | 20 | EU | (Spain) Sporting Gijón | Loan return | Summer | 2020 | Free | FCBarcelona.com |
| — | FW | (Spain) | Cristian Tello | 24 | EU | (Italy) Fiorentina | Loan return | Summer | 2020 | Free | FCBarcelona.com |
| 23 | DF | (France) | Samuel Umtiti | 22 | EU | (France) Lyon | Transfer | Summer | 2021 | €25M | FCBarcelona.com |
| 19 | DF | (France) | Lucas Digne | 22 | EU | (France) Paris Saint-Germain | Transfer | Summer | 2021 | €16.5M+€4M variables | FCBarcelona.com |
| 21 | MF | (Portugal) | André Gomes | 22 | EU | (Spain) Valencia | Transfer | Summer | 2021 | €35M+€20M variables | FCBarcelona.com |
| 13 | GK | (Netherlands) | Jasper Cillessen | 27 | EU | (Netherlands) Ajax | Transfer | Summer | 2021 | €13M+€2M variables | FCBarcelona.com |
| 17 | FW | (Spain) | Paco Alcácer | 23 | EU | (Spain) Valencia | Transfer | Summer | 2021 | €30M+€2M variables | FCBarcelona.com |

Total spending: €122.75M

=== Players out ===
| No. | Pos. | Nat. | Name | Age | EU | Moving to | Type | Transfer window | Transfer fee | Source |
|---|---|---|---|---|---|---|---|---|---|---|
| 19 | FW | (Spain) | Sandro Ramírez | 20 | EU | (Spain) Málaga | End of contract | Summer | Free | MalagaCF.com |
| 6 | DF | (Brazil) | Dani Alves | 33 | EU | (Italy) Juventus | End of contract | Summer | Free | Juventus.com |
| 15 | CB | (Spain) | Marc Bartra | 25 | EU | (Germany) Borussia Dortmund | Transfer | Summer | €8M | BVB.de |
| 30 | MF | (Croatia) | Alen Halilović | 20 | EU | (Germany) Hamburg | Transfer | Summer | €5M | HSV.de |
| 21 | DF | (Brazil) | Adriano | 31 | EU | (Turkey) Beşiktaş | Transfer | Summer | €0.6M | BJK.tr.com |
| — | DF | (Spain) | Martín Montoya | 25 | EU | (Spain) Valencia | Contract termination | Summer | Free | ValenciaCF.com |
| 17 | MF | (Cameroon) | Alex Song | 28 | EU | (Russia) Rubin Kazan | Contract termination | Summer | Free | sportseon.com |
| 23 | DF | (Belgium) | Thomas Vermaelen | 30 | EU | (Italy) Roma | Loan | Summer | Free | ASRoma.com |
| — | FW | (Spain) | Cristian Tello | 25 | EU | (Italy) Fiorentina | Loan | Summer | Free | ViolaChannel.tv |
| 13 | GK | (Chile) | Claudio Bravo | 33 | EU | (England) Manchester City | Transfer | Summer | €18M+€2M variables | ManCity.com |
| 16 | MF | (Spain) | Sergi Samper | 21 | EU | (Spain) Granada | Loan | Summer | Free | GranadaCF.es |
| 2 | DF | (Brazil) | Douglas | 26 | Non-EU | (Spain) Sporting Gijón | Loan | Summer | Free | RealSporting.com |
| 17 | FW | (Spain) | Munir El Haddadi | 20 | EU | (Spain) Valencia | Loan | Summer | Free | ValenciaCF.com |

Total income: €31.6 million

Net: ▼€91.15 million

== Technical staff ==
| Position | Staff |
|---|---|
| First team head coach | Luis Enrique |
| Assistant coach | Juan Carlos Unzué |
| Technical assistant | Robert Moreno |
| Auxiliary coach | Joan Barbarà |
| Fitness coach | Rafa Pol |
| Goalkeeping coach | José Ramón de la Fuente |
| Scoutings | Àlex García; Jordi Melero; Jaume Torras |
| Physiotherapist | Jaume Minull; Juanjo Brau; Roger Gironès; Xavi Linde |
| Psychologist | Joaquín Valdés |
| Doctor | Ricard Pruna; Daniel Medina |
| Team liaison | Carles Naval |
| Football Area Technical Commission | Jordi Mestre; Javier Borda; Carles Rexach; Ariedo Braida |
| Academy director | Jordi Roura |
| B team coach | Gerard López |

Last updated: 26 August 2015
Source: FC Barcelona First Team, FC Barcelona B Team, Luis Enrique's full staff, Football Area Technical Commission

== Statistics ==
=== Squad appearances and goals ===
Last updated on 27 May 2017.

| No. | Pos | Nat | Player | Total | | La Liga | | Champions League | | Copa del Rey | | Supercopa | |
| No. | Pos | Nat | Player | Apps | Goals | Apps | Goals | Apps | Goals | Apps | Goals | Apps | Goals |
Goalkeepers
| 1 | GK | (Germany) GER | Marc-André ter Stegen | 46 | 0 | 36 | 0 | 9 | 0 | 1 | 0 | 0 | 0 |
| 13 | GK | (Netherlands) NED | Jasper Cillessen | 10 | 0 | 1 | 0 | 1 | 0 | 8 | 0 | 0 | 0 |
| 25 | GK | (Spain) ESP | Jordi Masip | 0 | 0 | 0 | 0 | 0 | 0 | 0 | 0 | 0 | 0 |
Defenders
| 3 | DF | (Spain) ESP | Gerard Piqué | 41 | 3 | 25 | 2 | 8 | 1 | 7 | 0 | 1 | 0 |
| 14 | DF | (Argentina) ARG | Javier Mascherano | 40 | 1 | 25 | 1 | 8 | 0 | 5 | 0 | 2 | 0 |
| 18 | DF | (Spain) ESP | Jordi Alba | 39 | 1 | 26 | 1 | 6 | 0 | 6 | 0 | 1 | 0 |
| 19 | DF | (France) FRA | Lucas Digne | 26 | 1 | 17 | 0 | 4 | 0 | 3 | 1 | 2 | 0 |
| 20 | MF | (Spain) ESP | Sergi Roberto | 47 | 1 | 32 | 0 | 8 | 1 | 6 | 0 | 1 | 0 |
| 22 | DF | (Spain) ESP | Aleix Vidal | 12 | 2 | 6 | 2 | 1 | 0 | 4 | 0 | 1 | 0 |
| 23 | DF | (France) FRA | Samuel Umtiti | 43 | 1 | 25 | 1 | 8 | 0 | 9 | 0 | 1 | 0 |
| 24 | DF | (France) FRA | Jérémy Mathieu | 16 | 1 | 13 | 1 | 2 | 0 | 0 | 0 | 1 | 0 |
| 31 | DF | (Spain) ESP | Nili | 1 | 0 | 0 | 0 | 0 | 0 | 1 | 0 | 0 | 0 |
| 33 | DF | (Brazil) BRA | Marlon Santos | 3 | 0 | 2 | 0 | 1 | 0 | 0 | 0 | 0 | 0 |
| 35 | DF | (Spain) ESP | Borja López | 1 | 0 | 0 | 0 | 0 | 0 | 1 | 0 | 0 | 0 |
Midfielders
| 4 | MF | (Croatia) CRO | Ivan Rakitić | 51 | 9 | 32 | 8 | 9 | 0 | 8 | 1 | 2 | 0 |
| 5 | MF | (Spain) ESP | Sergio Busquets | 48 | 0 | 33 | 0 | 8 | 0 | 5 | 0 | 2 | 0 |
| 6 | MF | (Spain) ESP | Denis Suárez | 36 | 3 | 26 | 1 | 1 | 0 | 7 | 2 | 2 | 0 |
| 7 | MF | (Turkey) TUR | Arda Turan | 30 | 13 | 18 | 3 | 5 | 4 | 5 | 4 | 2 | 2 |
| 8 | MF | (Spain) ESP | Andrés Iniesta | 37 | 1 | 23 | 0 | 8 | 1 | 5 | 0 | 1 | 0 |
| 12 | MF | (Brazil) BRA | Rafinha | 29 | 7 | 18 | 6 | 6 | 0 | 4 | 1 | 1 | 0 |
| 21 | MF | (Portugal) POR | André Gomes | 47 | 3 | 30 | 3 | 8 | 0 | 8 | 0 | 1 | 0 |
| 28 | MF | (Spain) ESP | Carles Aleñá | 4 | 1 | 3 | 0 | 0 | 0 | 1 | 1 | 0 | 0 |
| 30 | MF | (Spain) ESP | Álex Carbonell | 1 | 0 | 0 | 0 | 0 | 0 | 1 | 0 | 0 | 0 |
Forwards
| 9 | FW | (Uruguay) URU | Luis Suárez | 51 | 37 | 35 | 29 | 9 | 3 | 6 | 4 | 1 | 1 |
| 10 | FW | (Argentina) ARG | Lionel Messi | 52 | 54 | 34 | 37 | 9 | 11 | 7 | 5 | 2 | 1 |
| 11 | FW | (Brazil) BRA | Neymar | 45 | 20 | 30 | 13 | 9 | 4 | 6 | 3 | 0 | 0 |
| 17 | FW | (Spain) ESP | Paco Alcácer | 27 | 8 | 20 | 6 | 3 | 0 | 4 | 2 | 0 | 0 |
| 29 | FW | (Spain) ESP | Marc Cardona | 2 | 0 | 0 | 0 | 1 | 0 | 1 | 0 | 0 | 0 |
Players who have made an appearance or had a squad number this season but have left the club
| 2 | DF | (Brazil) BRA | Douglas | 0 | 0 | 0 | 0 | 0 | 0 | 0 | 0 | 0 | 0 |
| 13 | GK | (Chile) CHI | Claudio Bravo | 3 | 0 | 1 | 0 | 0 | 0 | 0 | 0 | 2 | 0 |
| 16 | MF | (Spain) ESP | Sergi Samper | 0 | 0 | 0 | 0 | 0 | 0 | 0 | 0 | 0 | 0 |
| 17 | FW | (Spain) ESP | Munir El Haddadi | 3 | 1 | 1 | 0 | 0 | 0 | 0 | 0 | 2 | 1 |

=== Squad statistics ===
| | League | Europe | Cup | Others | Total Stats |
|---|---|---|---|---|---|
| Games played | 38 | 10 | 9 | 2 | 59 |
| Games won | 28 | 6 | 6 | 2 | 42 |
| Games drawn | 6 | 1 | 2 | 0 | 9 |
| Games lost | 4 | 3 | 1 | 0 | 8 |
| Goals scored | 116 | 26 | 24 | 5 | 171 |
| Goals conceded | 37 | 12 | 9 | 0 | 58 |
| Goal difference | 79 | 14 | 15 | 5 | 113 |
| Clean sheets | 12 | 4 | 2 | 2 | 19 |
| Goal by Substitute | 2 | 2 | 1 | 1 | 5 |
| Total shots | – | – | – | – | – |
| Shots on target | – | – | – | – | – |
| Corners | – | – | – | – | – |
| Players used | – | – | – | – | – |
| Offsides | – | – | – | – | – |
| Fouls suffered | – | – | – | – | – |
| Fouls committed | – | – | – | – | – |
| Yellow cards | 65 | 20 | 17 | 3 | 105 |
| Red cards | 1 | 1 | 2 | 0 | 4 |

Last updated: 5 August 2016
Source: La liga statistics, UEFA Champions League statistics, Copa Del Rey statistics

Players Used: Barcelona has used a total of – different players in all competitions.

=== Goalscorers ===
| No. | Pos. | Nation | Name | La Liga | Champions League | Copa del Rey | Supercopa de España | Total |
|---|---|---|---|---|---|---|---|---|
| 10 | FW | (Argentina) | Messi | 37 | 11 | 5 | 1 | 54 |
| 9 | FW | (Uruguay) | Suárez | 29 | 3 | 4 | 1 | 37 |
| 11 | FW | (Brazil) | Neymar Jr | 14 | 4 | 3 | 0 | 21 |
| 7 | MF | (Turkey) | Arda | 3 | 4 | 4 | 2 | 13 |
| 4 | MF | (Croatia) | I. Rakitić | 8 | 0 | 1 | 0 | 9 |
| 17 | FW | (Spain) | Paco Alcácer | 6 | 0 | 2 | 0 | 8 |
| 12 | MF | (Brazil) | Rafinha | 6 | 0 | 1 | 0 | 7 |
| 3 | DF | (Spain) | Piqué | 2 | 1 | 0 | 0 | 3 |
| 6 | MF | (Spain) | Denis Suárez | 1 | 0 | 2 | 0 | 3 |
| 21 | MF | (Portugal) | André Gomes | 3 | 0 | 0 | 0 | 3 |
| 22 | DF | (Spain) | Aleix Vidal | 2 | 0 | 0 | 0 | 2 |
| 8 | MF | (Spain) | A. Iniesta | 0 | 1 | 0 | 0 | 1 |
| 14 | MF | (Argentina) | Mascherano | 1 | 0 | 0 | 0 | 1 |
| 18 | DF | (Spain) | Jordi Alba | 1 | 0 | 0 | 0 | 1 |
| 19 | DF | (France) | Digne | 0 | 0 | 1 | 0 | 1 |
| 20 | DF | (Spain) | S. Roberto | 0 | 1 | 0 | 0 | 1 |
| 23 | DF | (France) | Umtiti | 1 | 0 | 0 | 0 | 1 |
| 24 | DF | (France) | Mathieu | 1 | 0 | 0 | 0 | 1 |
| 28 | MF | (Spain) | Aleñá | 0 | 0 | 1 | 0 | 1 |
| ~~17~~ | FW | (Spain) | Munir | 0 | 0 | 0 | 1 | 1 |
| # | Own goals | | | 2 | 1 | 0 | 0 | 3 |
| TOTAL | | | | 116 | 26 | 24 | 5 | 171 |

Last updated: 27 May 2017

=== Hat-tricks ===
| Player | Against | Result | Date | Competition |
|---|---|---|---|---|
| (Uruguay) Luis Suárez | (Spain) Real Betis | 6–2 (H) | 20 August 2016 | La Liga |
| (Argentina) Lionel Messi | (Scotland) Celtic | 7–0 (H) | 13 September 2016 | Champions League |
| (Argentina) Lionel Messi | (England) Manchester City | 4–0 (H) | 19 October 2016 | Champions League |
| (Turkey) Arda Turan | (Germany) Borussia Mönchengladbach | 4–0 (H) | 6 December 2016 | Champions League |
| (Turkey) Arda Turan | (Spain) Hércules | 7–0 (H) | 21 December 2016 | Copa del Rey |
| (Brazil) Neymar | (Spain) Las Palmas | 1–4 (A) | 14 May 2017 | La Liga |

(H) – Home; (A) – Away

=== Clean sheets ===
Updated 14 January 2017.

| Rank | Name | La Liga | Copa del Rey | Champions League | Supercopa de España | Total | Played Games |
|---|---|---|---|---|---|---|---|
| 1 | (Germany) Ter Stegen | 12 | 0 | 3 | 0 | 15 | 26 |
| 1 | (Netherlands) Jasper Cillessen | 0 | 2 | 1 | 0 | 3 | 9 |
| 1 | (Chile) Claudio Bravo | 0 | 0 | 0 | 2 | 2 | 3 |
| Total | | 10 | 2 | 4 | 2 | 18 | 38 |

=== Disciplinary record ===
Includes all competitive matches. Players listed below made at least one appearance for Barcelona first squad during the season.

| N | P | Nat. | Name | La Liga | | | Champions League | | | Copa del Rey | | | Supercopa de España | | | Total | | | Notes |
| N | P | Nat. | Name | Yellow card | Second yellow card | Red card | Yellow card | Second yellow card | Red card | Yellow card | Second yellow card | Red card | Yellow card | Second yellow card | Red card | Yellow card | Second yellow card | Red card | Notes |
| 1 | GK | (Germany) | Ter Stegen | 1 | | | 1 | | | | | | | | | 2 | | | |
| 3 | DF | (Spain) | Piqué | 6 | | | | | | | | | | | | 6 | | | |
| 4 | MF | (Croatia) | I. Rakitić | 5 | | | 4 | | | 1 | | | | | | 10 | | | |
| 5 | MF | (Spain) | Sergio | 9 | | | 3 | | | 1 | | | 1 | | | 14 | | | |
| 6 | MF | (Spain) | Denis Suárez | 1 | | | | | | | | | | | | 1 | | | |
| 7 | MF | (Turkey) | Arda | 1 | | | | | | | | | | | | 1 | | | |
| 8 | MF | (Spain) | A. Iniesta | 2 | | | 2 | | | 2 | | | | | | 6 | | | |
| 9 | FW | (Uruguay) | Suárez | 8 | | | 2 | | | 1 | 1 | | 1 | | | 12 | 1 | | Ban sustained - 2 Games(Copa del Rey) for stay in the ground; Banned on 9 February 2017 - Returned on November 2017 |
| 10 | FW | (Argentina) | Messi | 6 | | | | | | 3 | | | | | | 9 | | | |
| 11 | FW | (Brazil) | Neymar Jr | 6 | 1 | | 5 | | | 3 | | | | | | 14 | 1 | | Ban sustained - 3 Games(La Liga) for clapping towards the referee; Banned on 15 April 2017 - Returned on 27 April 2017 |
| 12 | MF | (Brazil) | Rafinha | 1 | | | 1 | | | | | | | | | 2 | | | |
| 13 | GK | (Netherlands) | Cillessen | | | | | | | 1 | | | | | | 1 | | | |
| 14 | MF | (Argentina) | Mascherano | 6 | | | 1 | | | 1 | | | | | | 8 | | | |
| 17 | FW | (Spain) | Paco Alcácer | 1 | | | | | | | | | | | | 1 | | | |
| 18 | MF | (Spain) | Jordi Alba | 4 | | | 1 | | | 2 | | | | | | 7 | | | |
| 19 | DF | (France) | Digne | 3 | | | | | | | | | | | | 3 | | | |
| 20 | MF | (Spain) | S. Roberto | 5 | | | 1 | | | | 1 | | | | | 6 | 1 | | |
| 21 | MF | (Portugal) | André Gomes | 3 | | | 1 | | | | | | | | | 4 | | | |
| 22 | DF | (Spain) | Aleix Vidal | | | | | | | 1 | | | | | | 1 | | | |
| 23 | DF | (France) | Umtiti | 4 | | | 1 | | | 3 | | | 1 | | | 9 | | | |
| 24 | DF | (France) | Mathieu | | | | | 1 | | | | | | | | | 1 | | |
| 28 | MF | (Spain) | Aleñá | 1 | | | | | | | | | | | | 1 | | | |

Last updated: 27 May 2017
Source: ESPNFC.com, FCBarcelona.com
Ordered by (red card) , (second yellow card) and (yellow card)
(yellow card) = Number of bookings; (second yellow card) = Number of sending offs after a second yellow card; (red card) = Number of sending offs by a direct red card.

=== Injury record ===
| N | P | Nat. | Name | Type | Status | Source | Match | Inj. Date | Ret. Date |
| 1 | GK | (Germany) | Ter Stegen | Knee Injury (sprained ligament in left knee) | | FCB.com | in training | 11 August 2016 | 24 August 2016 |
| 8 | MF | (Spain) | A. Iniesta | Knee Injury (strained posterior capsule in right knee) | | FCB.com | vs Sevilla | 14 August 2016 | 10 September 2016 |
| 24 | DF | (France) | Mathieu | Hamstring (torn femoral bicep in right leg) | | FCB.com | vs Sevilla | 14 August 2016 | 10 September 2016 |
| 14 | MF | (Argentina) | Mascherano | Hamstring (in right leg) | | FCB.com | vs Sevilla | 17 August 2016 | 24 August 2016 |
| 10 | FW | (Argentina) | Messi | Groin injury (abductor muscle in left hamstring) | | FCB.com | vs Athletic Bilbao | 28 August 2016 | 10 September 2016 |
| 21 | MF | (Portugal) | André Gomes | Muscular bruise (on right leg) | | FCB.com | in training with Portugal | 30 August 2016 | 13 September 2016 |
| 1 | GK | (Germany) | Ter Stegen | Hamstring (pulled hamstring) | | FCB.com | in training | 9 September 2016 | 13 September 2016 |
| 23 | DF | (France) | Umtiti | Knee injury (Internal ligament strain on his left knee) | | FCB.com | in training | 20 September 2016 | 15 October 2016 |
| 10 | FW | (Argentina) | Messi | Groin injury (in right leg) | | FCB.com | vs Atlético Madrid | 21 September 2016 | 15 October 2016 |
| 18 | DF | (Spain) | Jordi Alba | Thigh injury (in left leg) | | FCB.com | vs Italy with Spain | 6 October 2016 | 19 October 2016 |
| 20 | RB | (Spain) | S. Roberto | Abductor strain (in right leg) | | FCB.com | in training with Spain | 8 October 2016 | 22 October 2016 |
| 13 | GK | (Netherlands) | Jasper Cillessen | Ankle sprain (sprained ligaments in his right ankle) | | FCB.com | in training with Netherlands | 8 October 2016 | 29 October 2016 |
| 18 | DF | (Spain) | Jordi Alba | Thigh injury (strained left hamstring) | | FCB.com | vs Manchester City | 19 October 2016 | 19 November 2016 |
| 3 | DF | (Spain) | Piqué | Ankle sprain (sprained ligaments in right ankle) | | FCB.com | vs Manchester City | 19 October 2016 | 19 November 2016 |
| 23 | DF | (France) | Umtiti | Thigh injury (rupture to the femoral biceps muscle of his left thigh) | | FCB.com | in training with France | 9 November 2016 | 30 November 2016 |
| 8 | MF | (Spain) | A.Iniesta | Knee injury (lateral collateral ligament in right knee) | | FCB.com | vs Valencia | 22 October 2016 | 3 December 2016 |
| 24 | DF | (France) | Mathieu | Calf Injury (tear in right soleus) | | FCB.com | vs Espanyol | 25 October 2016 | 5 January 2017 |
| 13 | GK | (Netherlands) | Jasper Cillessen | Soleus muscle (in left leg) | | FCB.com | in the vacation | 30 December 2016 | 12 January 2017 |
| 12 | MF | (Brazil) | Rafinha | Hamstring (in right biceps femoris muscle) | | FCB.com | in training | 17 January 2017 | 1 February 2017 |
| 8 | MF | (Spain) | A. Iniesta | Soleus muscle (in left leg) | | FCB.com | vs Real Sociedad | 20 January 2017 | 7 February 2017 |
| 5 | MF | (Spain) | Sergio | Ankle sprain (Sprained external lateral ligament in right ankle) | | FCB.com | vs Eibar | 22 January 2017 | 7 February 2017 |
| 12 | MF | (Brazil) | Rafinha | Nose Fractured | | FCB.com | vs Athletic Bilbao | 4 February 2017 | 14 February 2017 |
| 14 | MF | (Argentina) | Mascherano | Hamstring (thigh injury in left leg) | | FCB.com | vs Atlético Madrid | 7 February 2017 | 1 March 2017 |
| 24 | DF | (France) | Mathieu | Ankle sprain | | FCB.com | vs Atlético Madrid | 26 February 2017 | 2 April 2017 |
| 14 | MF | (Argentina) | Mascherano | Calf Injury (in left leg) | | FCB.com | vs Juventus | 11 April 2017 | 19 April 2017 |
| 7 | MF | (Turkey) | Arda | Adductor muscle | | FCB.com | vs Finland with Turkey | 24 March 2017 | 23 April 2017 |
| 22 | DF | (Spain) | Aleix Vidal | Broken ankle | | FCB.com | vs Alavés | 11 February 2017 | 27 May 2017 |
| 14 | MF | (Argentina) | Mascherano | Knee injury (capsule strain in right knee) | | FCB.com | vs Alavés | 27 August 2017 | July 2017 |
| 12 | MF | (Brazil) | Rafinha | Meniscus problem (in right knee) | | FCB.com | vs Granada | 2 April 2017 | 18 December 2017 |

- Player is injured
- Player has recovered from injury
Last updated: 18 December 2017
Source: FC Barcelona

== Pre-season and friendlies ==
Win Draw Loss

=== International Champions Cup ===
| 30 July 2016 1 | Celtic | 1–3 | Barcelona | Dublin, Ireland |
| 18:00 IST | Griffiths 29' | ICC Report; Club Report | Turan 11'; Ambrose 31' (o.g.); Munir 41' | Stadium: Aviva Stadium; Attendance: 47,900; Referee: Neil Doyle (Republic of Ireland) |

| 3 August 2016 2 | Barcelona | 4–2 | Leicester City | Stockholm, Sweden |
| 20:00 CEST | Munir 26', 45'; L. Suárez 34'; D. Suárez (yellow card) 38'; Mújica 84' | ICC Report; Club Report | Musa 47', 66' | Stadium: Friends Arena; Attendance: 42,879; Referee: Martin Strömbergsson (Sweden) |

| 6 August 2016 3 | Liverpool | 4–0 | Barcelona | London, England |
| 17:15 BST | Mané 15'; Mascherano 47' (o.g.); Origi 48'; Grujić 90+3' | ICC Report; Club Report | | Stadium: Wembley Stadium; Attendance: 89,845; Referee: Martin Atkinson (England) |

=== Joan Gamper Trophy ===
| 10 August 2016 4 | Barcelona | 3–2 | Sampdoria | Barcelona, Spain |
| 20:30 CEST | L. Suárez 16'; Messi 21', 34' | Report | Muriel 23'; Budimir 77' | Stadium: Camp Nou; Attendance: 72,334; Referee: Alfonso Javier Álvarez Izquierdo (Spain) |

=== Supercopa de Catalunya ===
| 25 October 2016 5 | Barcelona | 0–1 | Espanyol | Tarragona, Spain |
| 21:30 CEST | Aleñá (yellow card) 30'; Alcácer (yellow card) 31'; Nili (yellow card) 61' | Report | Caicedo 9', (yellow card) 50'; Demichelis (yellow card) 18'; Sánchez (yellow card) 71' | Stadium: Nou Estadi; Attendance: 12,810; Referee: Xavier Estrada Fernández (Spain) |

=== Qatar Airways Cup ===
| 13 December 2016 6 | Al-Ahli | 3–5 | Barcelona | Doha, Qatar |
| 19:00 AST | Abdulrahman 51' (pen.); Assiri 60', 65' | Report | L. Suárez 8'; Messi 10'; Neymar 17'; Alcácer 55'; Rafinha 58' | Stadium: Thani bin Jassim Stadium; Attendance: 18,126; Referee: Fahad Al-Marri (Qatar) |

== Competitions ==
Win Draw Loss

=== Overview ===
| Competition | First match | Last match | Starting round | Final position | Record | | | | | | | |
| Competition | First match | Last match | Starting round | Final position | Pld | W | D | L | GF | GA | GD | Win % |
|---|---|---|---|---|---|---|---|---|---|---|---|---|
| La Liga | 20 August 2016 | 21 May 2017 | Matchday 1 | 2nd | 38 | 28 | 6 | 4 | 116 | 37 | +79 | 73.68 |
| Copa del Rey | 30 November 2016 | 27 May 2017 | Round of 32 | Winners | 9 | 6 | 2 | 1 | 24 | 9 | +15 | 66.67 |
| Supercopa de España | 14 August 2016 | 17 August 2016 | Final | Winners | 2 | 2 | 0 | 0 | 5 | 0 | +5 | 100.00 |
| Champions League | 13 September 2016 | 19 April 2017 | Group stage | Quarter-finals | 10 | 6 | 1 | 3 | 26 | 12 | +14 | 60.00 |
| Total | | | | | 59 | 42 | 9 | 8 | 171 | 58 | +113 | 71.19 |

Last updated: 27 May 2017.
Source: Competitions

=== La Liga ===
==== League table ====
| Pos | Team | Pld | W | D | L | GF | GA | GD | Pts | Qualification or relegation |
|---|---|---|---|---|---|---|---|---|---|---|
| 1 | Real Madrid (C) | 38 | 29 | 6 | 3 | 106 | 41 | +65 | 93 | Qualification for the Champions League group stage |
| 2 | Barcelona | 38 | 28 | 6 | 4 | 116 | 37 | +79 | 90 | Qualification for the Champions League group stage |
| 3 | Atlético Madrid | 38 | 23 | 9 | 6 | 70 | 27 | +43 | 78 | Qualification for the Champions League group stage |
| 4 | Sevilla | 38 | 21 | 9 | 8 | 69 | 49 | +20 | 72 | Qualification for the Champions League play-off round |
| 5 | Villarreal | 38 | 19 | 10 | 9 | 56 | 33 | +23 | 67 | Qualification for the Europa League group stage (Note: Since the winners of the 2016–17 Copa del Rey, Barcelona, qualified for European competition based on league position, the spot awarded to the cup winners (Europa League group stage) was passed to the sixth-placed team and the spot awarded to the sixth-placed team (Europa League third qualifying round) was passed to the seventh-placed team.) |

Source: La Liga, Soccerway
Rules for classification: 1) Points; 2) Head-to-head points; 3) Head-to-head goal difference; 4) Goal difference; 5) Goals scored; 6) Fair-play points; 7) Play-off.
(C) Champions

==== Results summary ====
| Overall | | | | | | | | Home | | | | | | Away | | | | | |
| Pld | W | D | L | GF | GA | GD | Pts | W | D | L | GF | GA | GD | W | D | L | GF | GA | GD |
|---|---|---|---|---|---|---|---|---|---|---|---|---|---|---|---|---|---|---|---|
| 38 | 28 | 6 | 4 | 116 | 37 | +79 | 90 | 15 | 3 | 1 | 64 | 17 | +47 | 13 | 3 | 3 | 52 | 20 | +32 |

Last updated: 21 May 2017.
Source: League matches

==== Results by round ====
| Round | 1 | 2 | 3 | 4 | 5 | 6 | 7 | 8 | 9 | 10 | 11 | 12 | 13 | 14 | 15 | 16 | 17 | 18 | 19 | 20 | 21 | 22 | 23 | 24 | 25 | 26 | 27 | 28 | 29 | 30 | 31 | 32 | 33 | 34 | 35 | 36 | 37 | 38 |
|---|---|---|---|---|---|---|---|---|---|---|---|---|---|---|---|---|---|---|---|---|---|---|---|---|---|---|---|---|---|---|---|---|---|---|---|---|---|---|
| Ground | H | A | H | A | H | A | A | H | A | H | A | H | A | H | A | H | A | H | A | A | H | A | H | A | H | H | A | H | A | H | A | H | A | H | A | H | A | H |
| Result | W | W | L | W | D | W | L | W | W | W | W | D | D | D | W | W | D | W | W | D | W | W | W | W | W | W | L | W | W | W | L | W | W | W | W | W | W | W |
| Position | 1 | 2 | 2 | 2 | 3 | 2 | 4 | 4 | 3 | 2 | 2 | 2 | 2 | 2 | 2 | 2 | 3 | 3 | 3 | 2 | 2 | 2 | 2 | 2 | 1 | 1 | 2 | 2 | 2 | 2 | 2 | 2 | 2 | 2 | 2 | 2 | 2 | 2 |

Updated to match(es) played on 21 May 2017. Source: League matches
A = Away; H = Home; W = Win; D = Draw; L = Loss

==== Matches ====
| 20 August 2016 1 | Barcelona | 6–2 | Real Betis | Barcelona |
| 18:15 CEST | Turan 6'; Messi 37', 57'; L. Suárez 42', 56', 82', (yellow card) 62' | Report | Castro 21', 84', (yellow card) 77'; Cejudo (yellow card) 45'; Ceballos (yellow card) 68' | Stadium: Camp Nou; Attendance: 65,731; Referee: Alberto Undiano Mallenco |

| 28 August 2016 2 | Athletic Bilbao | 0–1 | Barcelona | Bilbao |
| 20:15 CEST | Susaeta (yellow card) 45+1'; Iturraspe (yellow card) 56'; Eraso (yellow card) 62'; Beñat (yellow card) 83'; Balenziaga (yellow card) 89' | Report | Umtiti (yellow card) 10'; Rakitić 21'; Busquets (yellow card) 37'; L. Suárez (yellow card) 37'; Roberto (yellow card) 59' | Stadium: San Mamés; Attendance: 46,724; Referee: Antonio Miguel Mateu Lahoz |

| 10 September 2016 3 | Barcelona | 1–2 | Alavés | Barcelona |
| 20:30 CEST | Mathieu 46'; Mascherano (yellow card) 55' | Report | Deyverson 39'; Ibai 64'; Raúl (yellow card) 72' | Stadium: Camp Nou; Attendance: 72,303; Referee: Mario Melero López |

| 17 September 2016 4 | Leganés | 1–5 | Barcelona | Leganés |
| 13:00 CEST | Medjani (yellow card) 27'; Díaz (yellow card) 39'; Bustinza (yellow card) 54'; Gabriel 80'; Ramos (yellow card) 87' | Report | Messi 15', 55' (pen.); Rakitić (yellow card) 24'; L. Suárez 31'; Neymar 44', (yellow card) 80'; Rafinha 64' | Stadium: Butarque; Attendance: 10,422; Referee: Ricardo de Burgos Bengoetxea |

| 21 September 2016 5 | Barcelona | 1–1 | Atlético Madrid | Barcelona |
| 22:00 CEST | Rakitić 41'; L. Suárez (yellow card) 84'; Alba (yellow card) 90' | Report | Koke (yellow card) 54'; Correa 61'; Griezmann (yellow card) 67'; Partey (yellow card) 82'; Filipe Luís (yellow card) 86' | Stadium: Camp Nou; Attendance: 87,315; Referee: David José Fernández Borbalán |

| 24 September 2016 6 | Sporting Gijón | 0–5 | Barcelona | Gijón |
| 16:15 CEST | Lora (yellow card) 9' (yellow-red card) 74'; Amorebieta (yellow card) 86' | Report | L. Suárez 29'; Rafinha 32'; Neymar 81', 89'; Turan 85' | Stadium: El Molinón; Attendance: 25,899; Referee: Carlos del Cerro Grande |

| 2 October 2016 7 | Celta Vigo | 4–3 | Barcelona | Vigo |
| 20:45 CEST | Sisto 22'; Aspas 31'; Mathieu 33' (o.g.); Hernández 77' | Report | Busquets (yellow card) 45'; Piqué 58', 87', (yellow card) 74'; Neymar 64' (pen.); L. Suárez (yellow card) 88' | Stadium: Balaídos; Attendance: 20,034; Referee: Iñaki Vicandi Garrido |

| 16 October 2016 8 | Barcelona | 4–0 | Deportivo La Coruña | Barcelona |
| 16:15 CEST | Rafinha 21', 36'; L. Suárez 43'; Messi 58', (yellow card) 90' | Report | Mosquera (yellow card) 52'; Andone (yellow card) 59'; Laure (red card) 65' | Stadium: Camp Nou; Attendance: 81,595; Referee: José María Sánchez Martínez |

| 22 October 2016 9 | Valencia | 2–3 | Barcelona | Valencia |
| 16:15 CEST | Garay (yellow card) 17'; Alves (yellow card) 23'; Munir 52'; Rodrigo 56'; Suárez (yellow card) 69'; Pérez (yellow card) 76'; Abdennour (yellow card) 90+2' | Report | Messi 22', 90+4' (pen.), (yellow card) 73'; Busquets (yellow card) 25'; Digne (yellow card) 47'; Neymar (yellow card) 51'; L. Suárez 62' | Stadium: Mestalla; Attendance: 46,804; Referee: Alberto Undiano Mallenco |

| 29 October 2016 10 | Barcelona | 1–0 | Granada | Barcelona |
| 20:45 CEST | Rafinha 48'; Neymar (yellow card) 87' | Report | Silva (yellow card) 11'; Toral (yellow card) 73'; Lombán (yellow card) 79'; Vezo (yellow card) 87' | Stadium: Camp Nou; Attendance: 82,914; Referee: Juan Martínez Munuera |

| 6 November 2016 11 | Sevilla | 1–2 | Barcelona | Seville |
| 20:45 CET | Vitolo 15'; Rami (yellow card) 26'; Mariano (yellow card) 50'; Nzonzi (yellow card) 82'; Carriço (yellow card) 85' | Report | Neymar (yellow card) 10'; Messi 43', (yellow card) 83'; Roberto (yellow card) 44'; L. Suárez 61', (yellow card) 88'; Digne (yellow card) 66'; Mascherano (yellow card) 90+1' | Stadium: Ramón Sánchez Pizjuán; Attendance: 40,835; Referee: Santiago Jaime Latre |

| 19 November 2016 12 | Barcelona | 0–0 | Málaga | Barcelona |
| 16:15 CET | | Report | Ricca (yellow card) 22'; Ontiveros (yellow card) 62'; Llorente (red card) 68'; Juankar (red card) 90+7' | Stadium: Camp Nou; Attendance: 83,439; Referee: Ricardo de Burgos Bengoetxea |

| 27 November 2016 13 | Real Sociedad | 1–1 | Barcelona | San Sebastián |
| 20:45 CET | Willian 52'; Martínez (yellow card) 62'; Zurutuza (yellow card) 89' | Report | Ter Stegen (yellow card) 22'; Mascherano (yellow card) 55'; Messi 59'; D. Suárez (yellow card) 85'; Alba (yellow card) 90+3' | Stadium: Anoeta; Attendance: 27,639; Referee: Jesús Gil Manzano |

| 3 December 2016 14 | Barcelona | 1–1 | Real Madrid | Barcelona |
| 16:15 CET | Neymar (yellow card) 28'; L. Suárez 53', (yellow card) 75'; Busquets (yellow card) 83'; Mascherano (yellow card) 89' | Report | Isco (yellow card) 13'; Carvajal (yellow card) 80'; Ramos 90' | Stadium: Camp Nou; Attendance: 98,485; Referee: Carlos Clos Gómez |

| 10 December 2016 15 | Osasuna | 0–3 | Barcelona | Pamplona |
| 13:00 CET | Oier (yellow card) 27'; Márquez (yellow card) 27'; Torres (yellow card) 84' | Report | L. Suárez 59'; Messi 72', 90+2' | Stadium: El Sadar; Attendance: 17,349; Referee: Juan Martínez Munuera |

| 18 December 2016 16 | Barcelona | 4–1 | Espanyol | Barcelona |
| 20:45 CET | L. Suárez 18', 67'; Alba 68'; Messi 90' | Report | Piatti (yellow card) 10'; Martín (yellow card) 13'; Caicedo (yellow card) 65'; Da. López 79' | Stadium: Camp Nou; Attendance: 79,370; Referee: Antonio Miguel Mateu Lahoz |

| 8 January 2017 17 | Villarreal | 1–1 | Barcelona | Vila-real |
| 20:45 CET | Sansone 49', (yellow card) 78'; Costa (yellow card) 70' (yellow-red card) 90+4' | Report | Roberto (yellow card) 78'; Piqué (yellow card) 83'; Messi 90' | Stadium: La Cerámica; Attendance: 22,110; Referee: Ignacio Iglesias Villanueva |

| 14 January 2017 18 | Barcelona | 5–0 | Las Palmas | Barcelona |
| 16:15 CET | L. Suárez 14', 57'; Rafinha (yellow card) 25'; Mascherano (yellow card) 29'; Gomes (yellow card) 32'; Messi 52'; Turan 59'; Vidal 80' | Report | Mesa (yellow card) 2'; Hélder Lopes (yellow card) 41'; Boateng (yellow card) 54'; Livaja (yellow card) 77' | Stadium: Camp Nou; Attendance: 81,480; Referee: Alberto Undiano Mallenco |

| 22 January 2017 19 | Eibar | 0–4 | Barcelona | Eibar |
| 20:45 CET | Escalante (yellow card) 26'; Capa (yellow card) 39'; Sergi Enrich (yellow card) 44' | Report | D. Suárez 31'; Turan (yellow card) 42'; Messi 50'; L. Suárez 68'; Neymar 90+1' | Stadium: Ipurua; Attendance: 6,291; Referee: José María Sánchez Martínez |

| 29 January 2017 20 | Real Betis | 1–1 | Barcelona | Seville |
| 12:00 CET | Petros (yellow card) 67'; Alegría 75'; Castro (yellow card) 78' | Report | Piqué (yellow card) 43'; Rakitić (yellow card) 70'; Gomes (yellow card) 78'; L. Suárez 90' | Stadium: Benito Villamarín; Attendance: 37,620; Referee: Alejandro José Hernández Hernández |

| 4 February 2017 21 | Barcelona | 3–0 | Athletic Bilbao | Barcelona |
| 16:15 CET | Alcácer 18'; Piqué (yellow card) 22'; Messi 40'; Vidal 67' | Report | Iturraspe (yellow card) 27'; De Marcos (yellow card) 34'; Laporte (yellow card) 70' | Stadium: Camp Nou; Attendance: 83,884; Referee: José Luis González González |

| 11 February 2017 22 | Alavés | 0–6 | Barcelona | Vitoria-Gasteiz |
| 16:15 CET | Laguardia (yellow card) 90+3' | Report | Umtiti (yellow card) 6'; L. Suárez 37', 67'; Neymar 40'; Busquets (yellow card) 59'; Messi 59'; Rakitić (yellow card) 61', (goal) 65'; Alexis 63' (o.g.) | Stadium: Mendizorrotza; Attendance: 19,840; Referee: Carlos Clos Gómez |

| 19 February 2017 23 | Barcelona | 2–1 | Leganés | Barcelona |
| 20:45 CET | Messi 4', 90' (pen.); L. Suárez (yellow card) 46' | Report | Mantovani (yellow card) 46'; López 71'; Siovas (yellow card) 87'; Alberto (yellow card) 90+5' | Stadium: Camp Nou; Attendance: 63,378; Referee: Ignacio Iglesias Villanueva |

| 26 February 2017 24 | Atlético Madrid | 1–2 | Barcelona | Madrid |
| 16:15 CET | Saúl (yellow card) 56'; Savić (yellow card) 65'; Godín 70'; Gabi (yellow card) 73'; Correa (yellow card) 74' | Report | Busquets (yellow card) 55'; Rafinha 64'; Messi (yellow card) 82', (goal) 86' | Stadium: Vicente Calderón; Attendance: 52,440; Referee: Antonio Miguel Mateu Lahoz |

| 1 March 2017 25 | Barcelona | 6–1 | Sporting Gijón | Barcelona |
| 19:30 CET | Messi 9'; L. Suárez 11', 27'; Neymar (yellow card) 45', (goal) 65'; Alcácer 49'; Rakitić 87' | Report | Castro 21', (yellow card) 45'; Burgui (yellow card) 24'; Rodríguez (yellow card) 55' | Stadium: Camp Nou; Attendance: 56,605; Referee: José María Sánchez Martínez |

| 4 March 2017 26 | Barcelona | 5–0 | Celta Vigo | Barcelona |
| 20:45 CET | Busquets (yellow card) 20'; Messi 24', 64'; Neymar 40'; Rakitić 57'; Umtiti 61' | Report | Cabral (yellow card) 36'; Radoja (yellow card) 38'; S. Gómez (yellow card) 49' | Stadium: Camp Nou; Attendance: 77,117; Referee: Jesús Gil Manzano |

| 12 March 2017 27 | Deportivo La Coruña | 2–1 | Barcelona | A Coruña |
| 16:15 CET | Navarro (yellow card) 14'; Joselu (yellow card) 36', (goal) 40'; Bergantiños 74' | Report | L. Suárez 46' | Stadium: Riazor; Attendance: 28,474; Referee: David José Fernández Borbalán |

| 19 March 2017 28 | Barcelona | 4–2 | Valencia | Barcelona |
| 20:45 CET | L. Suárez 35'; Messi 45' (pen.), 52', (yellow card) 86'; Iniesta (yellow card) 67'; Gomes (yellow card) 77', (goal) 89' | Report | Enzo Pérez (yellow card) 24'; Mangala 29', (yellow card) 39' (red card) 44'; Parejo (yellow card) 43'; Munir 45'; Montoya (yellow card) 90+1' | Stadium: Camp Nou; Attendance: 77,058; Referee: Alejandro José Hernández Hernández |

| 2 April 2017 29 | Granada | 1–4 | Barcelona | Granada |
| 20:45 CEST | Boga 50'; Lombán (yellow card) 59'; Agbo (yellow card) 79' (yellow-red card) 82' | Report | Roberto (yellow card) 28'; L. Suárez 44'; Alba (yellow card) 60'; Alcácer 64'; Rakitić (yellow card) 77', (goal) 83'; Neymar 90+1' | Stadium: Nuevo Los Cármenes; Attendance: 18,717; Referee: Santiago Jaime Latre |

| 5 April 2017 30 | Barcelona | 3–0 | Sevilla | Barcelona |
| 19:30 CEST | Piqué (yellow card) 15'; L. Suárez 25'; Messi 28', 33'; Busquets (yellow card) 71'; Rakitić (yellow card) 78'; Aleñá (yellow card) 84' | Report | Iborra (yellow card) 38'; Vitolo (yellow card) 57' (yellow-red card) 90+1' | Stadium: Camp Nou; Attendance: 85,511; Referee: Carlos Clos Gómez |

| 8 April 2017 31 | Málaga | 2–0 | Barcelona | Málaga |
| 20:45 CEST | Sandro 32'; Ricca (yellow card) 37'; Recio (yellow card) 45'; Peñaranda (yellow card) 69'; Juan Carlos (yellow card) 82'; Jony 90' | Report | Alba (yellow card) 8'; Neymar (yellow card) 27' (yellow-red card) 65'; Umtiti (yellow card) 33'; Mascherano (yellow card) 87' | Stadium: La Rosaleda; Attendance: 28,486; Referee: Jesús Gil Manzano |

| 15 April 2017 32 | Barcelona | 3–2 | Real Sociedad | Barcelona |
| 20:45 CEST | Messi 17', 37'; Alcácer (yellow card) 41', (goal) 44'; L. Suárez (yellow card) 68'; Piqué (yellow card) 88' | Report | Vela (yellow card) 7'; Umtiti 42' (o.g.); Prieto 45+1'; Illarramendi (yellow card) 49' | Stadium: Camp Nou; Attendance: 81,704; Referee: Juan Martínez Munuera |

| 23 April 2017 33 | Real Madrid | 2–3 | Barcelona | Madrid |
| 20:45 CEST | Casemiro (yellow card) 12', (goal) 28'; Ramos (red card) 77'; Carvajal (yellow card) 78'; Kovačić (yellow card) 81'; Rodríguez 86' | Report | Messi 33', 90+2', (yellow card) 90+3'; Umtiti (yellow card) 39'; Rakitić 73' | Stadium: Santiago Bernabéu; Attendance: 81,044; Referee: Alejandro José Hernández Hernández |

| 26 April 2017 34 | Barcelona | 7–1 | Osasuna | Barcelona |
| 19:30 CEST | Messi 12', 61'; Gomes 30', 57'; Alcácer 64', 86'; Mascherano 67' (pen.) | Report | Torres 48' | Stadium: Camp Nou; Attendance: 62,453; Referee: José Luis Munuera Montero |

| 29 April 2017 35 | Espanyol | 0–3 | Barcelona | Cornellà de Llobregat |
| 20:45 CEST | Moreno (yellow card) 14'; Martín (yellow card) 58'; Fuego (yellow card) 68' | Report | L. Suárez 50', 87'; Rakitić 76' | Stadium: RCDE Stadium; Attendance: 31,082; Referee: Alberto Undiano Mallenco |

| 6 May 2017 36 | Barcelona | 4–1 | Villarreal | Barcelona |
| 18:30 CEST | Roberto (yellow card) 16'; Neymar 21'; Messi 45', 82' (pen.); Iniesta (yellow card) 64'; L. Suárez 69' | Report | Álvaro (yellow card) 19'; Bakambu 32'; Soldado (yellow card) 72'; Musacchio (yellow card) 77'; J. Costa (yellow card) 81' | Stadium: Camp Nou; Attendance: 88,268; Referee: José María Sánchez Martínez |

| 14 May 2017 37 | Las Palmas | 1–4 | Barcelona | Las Palmas |
| 20:00 CEST | Bigas 63' | Report | Digne (yellow card) 6'; Neymar 25', 67', 71'; L. Suárez 27' | Stadium: Gran Canaria; Attendance: 22,204; Referee: José Luis González González |

| 21 May 2017 38 | Barcelona | 4–2 | Eibar | Barcelona |
| 20:00 CEST | Busquets (yellow card) 41'; Juncà 63' (o.g.); L. Suárez 73'; Messi 75' (pen.), 90+2' | Report | Inui 7', 61'; Escalante (yellow card) 19'; Capa (yellow card) 30' (yellow-red card) 74'; Rubén Peña (yellow card) 54' | Stadium: Camp Nou; Attendance: 73,093; Referee: Alejandro José Hernández Hernández |

=== Copa del Rey ===
==== Round of 32 ====
| 30 November 2016 First leg | Hércules | 1–1 | Barcelona | Alicante |
| 22:00 CET | Mainz 52'; Peña (yellow card) 90' | Report | Aleñá 58' | Stadium: José Rico Pérez; Attendance: 14,250; Referee: Daniel Ocón Arráiz |

| 21 December 2016 Second leg | Barcelona | 7–0 (8–1 agg.) | Hércules | Barcelona |
| 22:00 CET | Digne 37'; Vidal (yellow card) 42'; Rakitić 45' (pen.); Rafinha 50'; Turan 55', 86', 89'; Alcácer 73' | Report | Peña (yellow card) 42' | Stadium: Camp Nou; Attendance: 64,025; Referee: José Luis Munuera Montero |

==== Round of 16 ====
| 5 January 2017 First leg | Athletic Bilbao | 2–1 | Barcelona | Bilbao |
| 21:15 CET | Aduriz 25', (yellow card) 40'; Williams 28'; Iturraspe (yellow card) 53' (yellow-red card) 80'; Raúl García (yellow card) 55' (yellow-red card) 74' | Report | Umtiti (yellow card) 40'; Busquets (yellow card) 45'; Iniesta (yellow card) 45'; Alba (yellow card) 45'; Messi 52' | Stadium: San Mamés; Attendance: 45,772; Referee: David José Fernández Borbalán |

| 11 January 2017 Second leg | Barcelona | 3–1 (4–3 agg.) | Athletic Bilbao | Barcelona |
| 21:15 CET | Umtiti (yellow card) 30'; L. Suárez 35'; Neymar 48' (pen.); Messi 78' | Report | Etxeita (yellow card) 28'; Laporte (yellow card) 41'; Saborit 51'; Elustondo (yellow card) 73'; Beñat (yellow card) 77'; Williams (yellow card) 90' | Stadium: Camp Nou; Attendance: 71,455; Referee: Jesús Gil Manzano |

==== Quarter-finals ====
| 19 January 2017 First leg | Real Sociedad | 0–1 | Barcelona | San Sebastián |
| 21:15 CET | Illarramendi (yellow card) 90+3' | Report | Neymar 21' (pen.), (yellow card) 64'; Messi (yellow card) 43' | Stadium: Anoeta; Attendance: 28,461; Referee: José Luis González González |

| 26 January 2017 Second leg | Barcelona | 5–2 (6–2 agg.) | Real Sociedad | Barcelona |
| 21:15 CET | D. Suárez 17', 82'; Neymar (yellow card) 40'; Alba (yellow card) 40'; Messi 55' (pen.); L. Suárez (yellow card) 51', (goal) 63'; Turan 80' | Report | Vela (yellow card) 40'; Berchiche (yellow card) 43'; I. Martínez (yellow card) 54'; Juanmi 62'; Willian José 73' | Stadium: Camp Nou; Attendance: 58,560; Referee: Juan Martínez Munuera |

==== Semi-finals ====
| 1 February 2017 First leg | Atlético Madrid | 1–2 | Barcelona | Madrid |
| 21:00 CET | Saúl (yellow card) 31'; Savić (yellow card) 39'; Griezmann 59', (yellow card) 75'; Gabi (yellow card) 84'; Juanfran (yellow card) 90+1' | Report | L. Suárez 7'; Messi 33', (yellow card) 90'; Neymar (yellow card) 64'; Mascherano (yellow card) 90+1' | Stadium: Vicente Calderón; Attendance: 48,124; Referee: Ricardo de Burgos Bengoetxea |

| 7 February 2017 Second leg | Barcelona | 1–1 (3–2 agg.) | Atlético Madrid | Barcelona |
| 21:00 CET | Roberto (yellow card) 19' (yellow-red card) 57'; L. Suárez 43', (yellow card) 87' (yellow-red card) 90'; Rakitić (yellow card) 66'; Cillessen (yellow card) 76'; Busquets (yellow card) 90+6' | Report | Carrasco (yellow card) 36' (yellow-red card) 69'; Savić (yellow card) 76'; Gameiro (penalty missed) 80', 83'; Filipe Luís (yellow card) 90+4' | Stadium: Camp Nou; Attendance: 67,734; Referee: Jesús Gil Manzano |

==== Final ====
| 27 May 2017 Final | Barcelona | 3–1 | Alavés | Madrid |
| 21:30 CEST | Messi 30', (yellow card) 76'; Umtiti (yellow card) 42'; Neymar 45'; Alcácer 45+3'; Iniesta (yellow card) 76' | Report | Edgar (yellow card) 16'; Hernandez 33'; Manu (yellow card) 39'; Rodrigo Ely (yellow card) 49'; Sobrino (yellow card) 76'; Deyverson (yellow card) 88' | Stadium: Vicente Calderón; Attendance: 50,000; Referee: Carlos Clos Gómez |

=== Supercopa de España ===
| 14 August 2016 First leg | Sevilla | 0–2 | Barcelona | Seville |
| 22:00 CEST | Mercado (yellow card) 32'; Nzonzi (yellow card) 70'; Vázquez (yellow card) 78' | Report | L. Suárez 55', (yellow card) 83'; Busquets (yellow card) 58'; Munir 81' | Stadium: Ramón Sánchez Pizjuán; Attendance: 36,311; Referee: Jesús Gil Manzano |

| 17 August 2016 Second leg | Barcelona | 3–0 (5–0 agg.) | Sevilla | Barcelona |
| 23:00 CEST | Turan 10', 46'; Umtiti (yellow card) 32'; Messi 55' | Report | Iborra (penalty missed) 32'; Sarabia (yellow card) 90' | Stadium: Camp Nou; Attendance: 71,803; Referee: Alejandro Hernández Hernández |

=== UEFA Champions League ===
==== Group stage ====
| Pos | Team | Pld | W | D | L | GF | GA | GD | Pts | Qualification | BAR | MCI | BMG | CEL |
|---|---|---|---|---|---|---|---|---|---|---|---|---|---|---|
| 1 | (Spain) Barcelona | 6 | 5 | 0 | 1 | 20 | 4 | +16 | 15 | Advance to knockout phase | — | 4–0 | 4–0 | 7–0 |
| 2 | (England) Manchester City | 6 | 2 | 3 | 1 | 12 | 10 | +2 | 9 | Advance to knockout phase | 3–1 | — | 4–0 | 1–1 |
| 3 | (Germany) Borussia Mönchengladbach | 6 | 1 | 2 | 3 | 5 | 12 | −7 | 5 | Transfer to Europa League | 1–2 | 1–1 | — | 1–1 |
| 4 | (Scotland) Celtic | 6 | 0 | 3 | 3 | 5 | 16 | −11 | 3 | | 0–2 | 3–3 | 0–2 | — |

Source: UEFA
Rules for classification: Group stage tiebreakers

| 13 September 2016 1 | Barcelona (Spain) | 7–0 | (Scotland) Celtic | Barcelona, Spain |
| 20:45 CEST | Messi 3', 27', 60'; Ter Stegen (yellow card) 23'; Rakitić (yellow card) 40'; Neymar 50'; Iniesta 59'; L. Suárez 75', 88' | UEFA Report; Club Report | Dembélé (penalty missed) 24'; Brown (yellow card) 56' | Stadium: Camp Nou; Attendance: 73,920; Referee: Ovidiu Hațegan (Romania) |

| 28 September 2016 2 | Borussia Mönchengladbach (Germany) | 1–2 | (Spain) Barcelona | Mönchengladbach, Germany |
| 20:45 CEST | Hazard 34' | UEFA Report; Club Report | Mascherano (yellow card) 63'; Turan 65'; Piqué (yellow card) 70', (goal) 74'; Neymar (yellow card) 90+1' | Stadium: Borussia-Park; Attendance: 46,283; Referee: Damir Skomina (Slovenia) |

| 19 October 2016 3 | Barcelona (Spain) | 4–0 | (England) Manchester City | Barcelona, Spain |
| 20:45 CEST | Messi 17', 61', 69'; Mathieu (yellow card) 71' (yellow-red card) 73'; Neymar (penalty missed) 87', 89' | UEFA Report; Club Report | Silva (yellow card) 29'; Fernandinho (yellow card) 40'; Bravo (red card) 53'; Sterling (yellow card) 90+2' | Stadium: Camp Nou; Attendance: 96,290; Referee: Milorad Mažić (Serbia) |

| 1 November 2016 4 | Manchester City (England) | 3–1 | (Spain) Barcelona | Manchester, England |
| 19:45 GMT | Sterling (yellow card) 11'; Gündoğan 39', 74'; De Bruyne 51'; Kolarov (yellow card) 60' | UEFA Report; Club Report | Rakitić (yellow card) 20'; Messi 21'; Neymar (yellow card) 29'; Busquets (yellow card) 74' | Stadium: City of Manchester Stadium; Attendance: 53,340; Referee: Viktor Kassai (Hungary) |

| 23 November 2016 5 | Celtic (Scotland) | 0–2 | (Spain) Barcelona | Glasgow, Scotland |
| 19:45 GMT | Sviatchenko (yellow card) 23'; Lustig (yellow card) 71'; Armstrong (yellow card) 87' | UEFA Report; Club Report | Messi 24', 56' (pen.); Alba (yellow card) 41'; Roberto (yellow card) 63'; Neymar (yellow card) 71'; Rakitić (yellow card) 88' | Stadium: Celtic Park; Attendance: 57,937; Referee: Daniele Orsato (Italy) |

| 6 December 2016 6 | Barcelona (Spain) | 4–0 | (Germany) Borussia Mönchengladbach | Barcelona, Spain |
| 20:45 CET | Messi 16'; Turan 50', 53', 67' | UEFA Report; Club Report | Dahoud (yellow card) 55' | Stadium: Camp Nou; Attendance: 67,157; Referee: Sergei Karasev (Russia) |

==== Knockout phase ====
===== Round of 16 =====
| 14 February 2017 First leg | Paris Saint-Germain (France) | 4–0 | (Spain) Barcelona | Paris, France |
| 20:45 CET | Rabiot (yellow card) 3'; Di María 18', 55'; Draxler 40'; Cavani 72' | UEFA Report; Club Report | Gomes (yellow card) 33'; Busquets (yellow card) 62'; Rafinha (yellow card) 74' | Stadium: Parc des Princes; Attendance: 46,484; Referee: Szymon Marciniak (Poland) |

| 8 March 2017 Second leg | Barcelona (Spain) | 6–1 (6–5 agg.) | (France) Paris Saint-Germain | Barcelona, Spain |
| 20:45 CET | L. Suárez 3', (yellow card) 67'; Piqué (yellow card) 23'; Busquets (yellow card) 36'; Kurzawa 40' (o.g.); Messi 50' (pen.); Rakitić (yellow card) 61'; Neymar (yellow card) 64', (goal) 88', 90+1' (pen.); Roberto 90+5' | UEFA Report; Club Report | Matuidi (yellow card) 5'; Draxler (yellow card) 14'; Cavani (yellow card) 42', (goal) 62'; Marquinhos (yellow card) 90'; Verratti (yellow card) 90+4' | Stadium: Camp Nou; Attendance: 96,290; Referee: Deniz Aytekin (Germany) |

===== Quarter-finals =====
| 11 April 2017 First leg | Juventus (Italy) | 3–0 | (Spain) Barcelona | Turin, Italy |
| 20:45 CEST | Dybala 7', 22'; Dani Alves (yellow card) 28'; Chiellini 55'; Mandžukić (yellow card) 63'; Khedira (yellow card) 74'; Lemina (yellow card) 90+1' | UEFA Report; Club Report | L. Suárez (yellow card) 53'; Iniesta (yellow card) 57'; Umtiti (yellow card) 90+1' | Stadium: Juventus Stadium; Attendance: 41,092; Referee: Szymon Marciniak (Poland) |

| 19 April 2017 Second leg | Barcelona (Spain) | 0–0 (0–3 agg.) | (Italy) Juventus | Barcelona, Spain |
| 20:45 CEST | Iniesta (yellow card) 41'; Neymar (yellow card) 44' | UEFA Report; Club Report | Chiellini (yellow card) 57'; Khedira (yellow card) 64' | Stadium: Camp Nou; Attendance: 96,290; Referee: Björn Kuipers (Netherlands) |
