= 2024 Supercopa de España final =

Final of the 40th edition of Supercopa de España

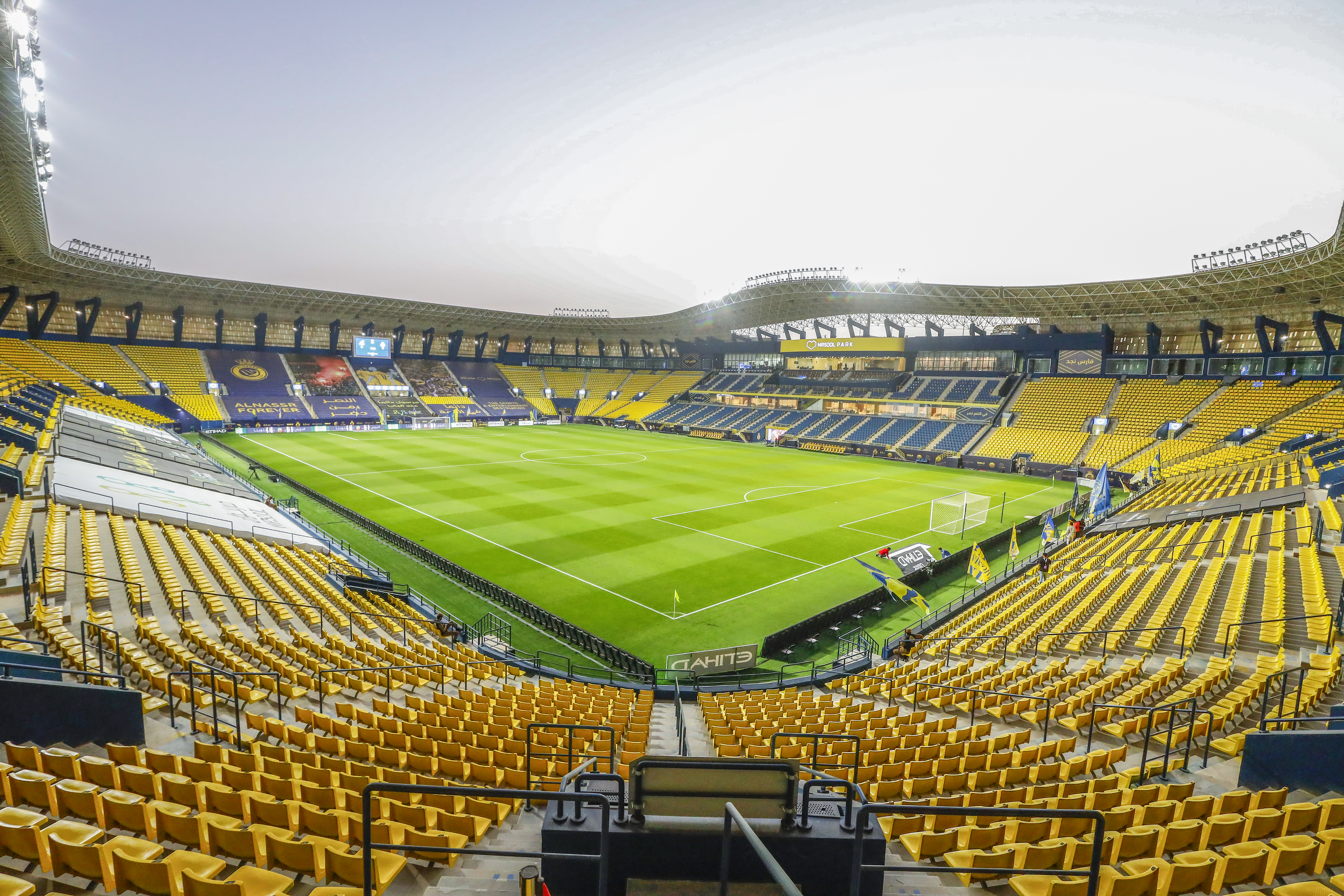
- The King Saud University Stadium in Riyadh hosted the final.
- Event: 2024 Supercopa de España
Real Madrid	Barcelona
4	1
- Date: 14 January 2024
- Venue: King Saud University Stadium, Riyadh
- Man of the Match: Vinícius Júnior (Real Madrid)
- Referee: Juan Martínez Munuera (Valencian Community)
- Attendance: 23,977
- Weather: Clear; 20 °C (68 °F); 30% humidity

The 2024 Supercopa de España final was a football match to decide the winner of the 2024 Supercopa de España, the 40th edition of the annual Spanish football super cup competition. The match was played on 14 January 2024 at the King Saud University Stadium in Riyadh, Saudi Arabia. The match was 'El Clásico' between the 2022–23 Copa del Rey winners and 2022–23 La Liga runners-up Real Madrid, and the 2022–23 La Liga winners Barcelona, the ninth time both clubs played each other in the competition's decisive tie (until 2020 its format was simply a two-legged match); the teams also faced each other in the previous season's final.

Real Madrid won the match 4–1 for their 13th Supercopa de España title.

== Teams ==
Team	Qualification for tournament	Previous finals appearances (bold indicates winners)
Real Madrid	2022–23 Copa del Rey winners and 2022–23 La Liga runners-up	18 (1982, **1988**, **1989**, (Note: Real Madrid won the double in 1988–89, and thus were automatically awarded the Supercopa de España title for 1989.) **1990**, **1993**, 1995, **1997**, **2001**, **2003**, 2007, **2008**, 2011, **2012**, 2014, **2017**, **2020**, **2022**, 2023)
Barcelona	2022–23 La Liga winners	25 (**1983**, 1985, 1988, 1990, **1991**, **1992**, 1993, **1994**, **1996**, 1997, 1998, 1999, **2005**, **2006**, **2009**, **2010**, **2011**, 2012, **2013**, 2015, **2016**, 2017, **2018**, 2021, **2023**)

== Route to the final ==
Real Madrid		Round	Barcelona	
Opponent	Result	2024 Supercopa de España	Opponent	Result
Atlético Madrid	5–3 (a.e.t.)	Semi-finals	Osasuna	2–0

== Match ==
=== Details ===
14 January 2024
22:00 AST

Real Madrid	4–1	Barcelona
Vinícius 7', 10', 39' (pen.); Rodrygo 64'	Report	Lewandowski 33'

King Saud University Stadium, Riyadh
Attendance: 23,977
Referee: Juan Martínez Munuera (Valencian Community)

**Real Madrid**	**Barcelona**

GK	13	(Ukraine) Andriy Lunin
RB	2	(Spain) Dani Carvajal
CB	22	(Germany) Antonio Rüdiger	(yellow card) 62'
CB	6	(Spain) Nacho (c)
LB	23	(France) Ferland Mendy
RM	15	(Uruguay) Federico Valverde		(substituted off) 86'
CM	18	(France) Aurélien Tchouaméni
LM	8	(Germany) Toni Kroos		(substituted off) 82'
AM	5	(England) Jude Bellingham	(yellow card) 43'	(substituted off) 86'
CF	11	(Brazil) Rodrygo		(substituted off) 77'
CF	7	(Brazil) Vinícius Júnior		(substituted off) 82'
Substitutes:
GK	25	(Spain) Kepa Arrizabalaga
DF	20	(Spain) Fran García
DF	36	(Brazil) Vinicius Tobias
MF	10	(Croatia) Luka Modrić		(substituted on) 82'
MF	12	(France) Eduardo Camavinga		(substituted on) 82'
MF	19	(Spain) Dani Ceballos		(substituted on) 86'
MF	24	(Turkey) Arda Güler
MF	28	(Spain) Mario Martín
MF	32	(Argentina) Nico Paz
FW	14	(Spain) Joselu		(substituted on) 86'
FW	21	(Morocco) Brahim Díaz		(substituted on) 77'
Manager:
(Italy) Carlo Ancelotti

GK	13	(Spain) Iñaki Peña
RB	23	(France) Jules Koundé
CB	4	(Uruguay) Ronald Araújo	(yellow card) 37' (yellow-red card) 71'
CB	15	(Denmark) Andreas Christensen
LB	3	(Spain) Alejandro Balde
CM	20	(Spain) Sergi Roberto (c)	(yellow card) 40'	(substituted off) 61'
CM	22	(Germany) İlkay Gündoğan
CM	21	(Netherlands) Frenkie de Jong
RW	8	(Spain) Pedri		(substituted off) 61'
CF	9	(Poland) Robert Lewandowski
LW	7	(Spain) Ferran Torres		(substituted off) 61'
Substitutes:
GK	26	(Spain) Ander Astralaga
GK	31	(United States) Diego Kochen
DF	33	(Spain) Pau Cubarsí
DF	39	(Spain) Héctor Fort
MF	18	(Spain) Oriol Romeu
MF	30	(Spain) Marc Casadó
MF	32	(Spain) Fermín López		(substituted on) 61'
FW	14	(Portugal) João Félix		(substituted on) 61'
FW	19	(Brazil) Vitor Roque
FW	27	(Spain) Lamine Yamal		(substituted on) 61'
FW	38	(Spain) Marc Guiu
Manager:
(Spain) Xavi

Man of the Match:
Vinícius Júnior (Real Madrid)

Assistant referees:
Diego Barbero Sevilla (Andalusia)
Miguel Martínez Munuera (Valencian Community)
Fourth official:
Mario Melero López (Andalusia)
Video assistant referee:
César Soto Grado (La Rioja)
Assistant video assistant referees:
Iker De Francisco Grijalba (Basque Country)
Francisco José Hernández Maeso (Extremadura)

**Match rules**

- 90 minutes.
- 30 minutes of extra time if necessary.
- Penalty shoot-out if scores still level.
- Eleven named substitutes.
- Maximum of five substitutions, with a sixth allowed in extra time. (Note: Each team was given only three opportunities to make substitutions, with a fourth opportunity in extra time, excluding substitutions made at half-time, before the start of extra time and at half-time in extra time.)

== See also ==
- 2023–24 FC Barcelona season
- 2023–24 Real Madrid CF season
