= 2023–24 FC Barcelona season =

125th season of FC Barcelona

Barcelona
2023–24 season
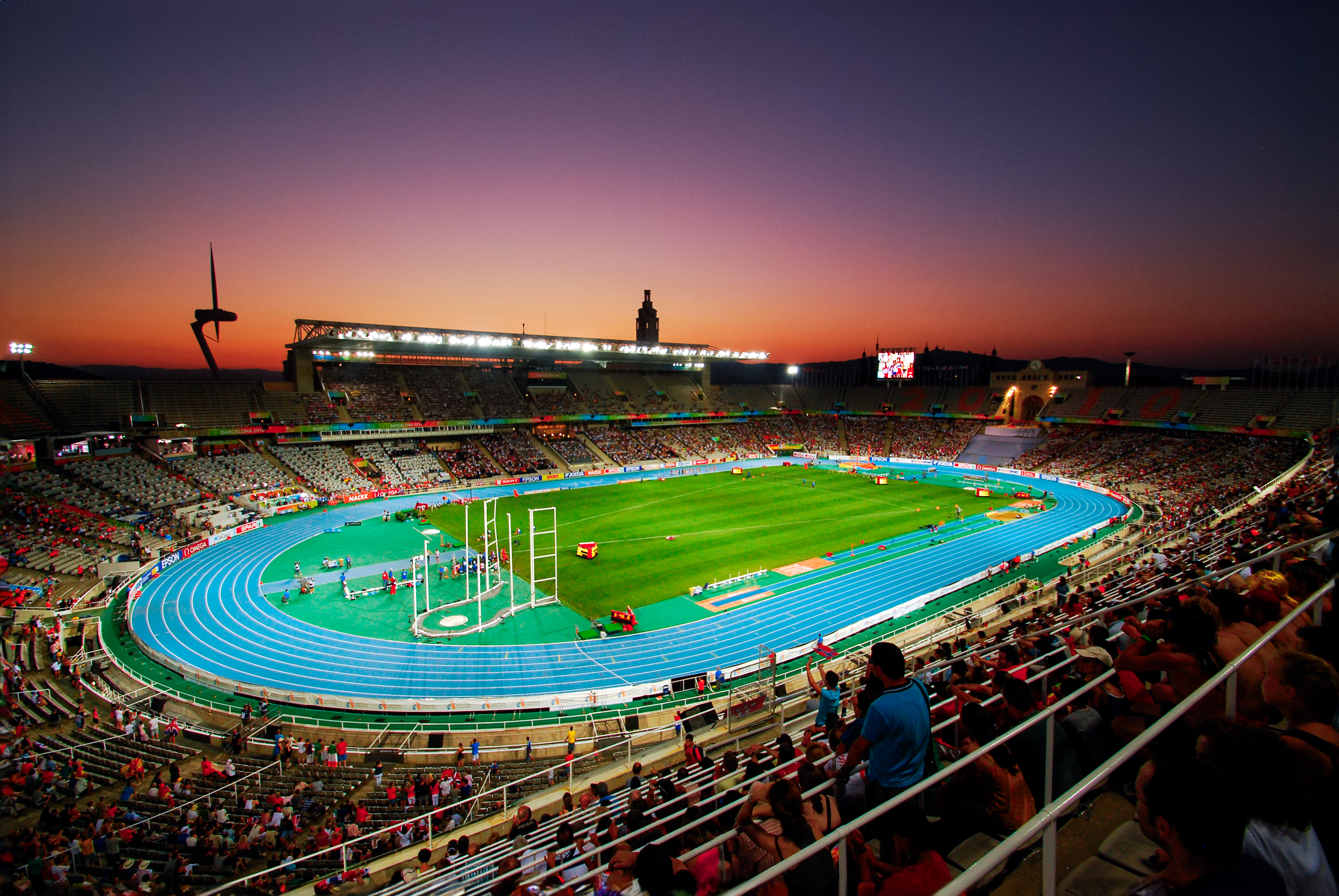
- Estadi Olímpic Lluís Companys was used as the season's home ground
- President: Joan Laporta
- Head coach: Xavi
- Stadium: Estadi Olímpic Lluís Companys
- La Liga: 2nd
- Copa del Rey: Quarter-finals
- Supercopa de España: Runners-up
- UEFA Champions League: Quarter-finals
- Top goalscorer: League: Robert Lewandowski (19); All: Robert Lewandowski (26)
- Highest home attendance: 50,309 vs Paris Saint-Germain (16 April 2024)
- Lowest home attendance: 30,167 vs Valencia (29 April 2024)
- Average home league attendance: 39,846
- Biggest win: Home: Barcelona 5–0 Real Betis; Barcelona 5–0 Antwerp; Away: Atlético Madrid 0–3 Barcelona
- Biggest defeat: Home: Barcelona 1–4 Paris Saint-Germain; Away: Real Madrid 4–1 Barcelona
Home colours	Away colours	Third colours

The 2023–24 Futbol Club Barcelona season was the club's 125th season in existence and their 93rd consecutive season in the top flight. In addition to the domestic league, Barcelona participated in this season's editions of the Copa del Rey, the Supercopa de España and the UEFA Champions League (entering for the 20th consecutive season). The season covered the period from 1 July 2023 until 30 June 2024.

Barcelona played their official home matches for the entire season at the Estadi Olímpic Lluís Companys due to the start of Espai Barça project to revamp the club's sporting facilities.

This season was the first without captain Sergio Busquets, who left the club as a free agent after 18 years, including 15 as a first-team player since the 2007–08 season. It was also the first full season in 15 years without Gerard Piqué, who retired in November 2022, and the first since 2011–12 without the left-back Jordi Alba, who terminated his contract one year early by mutual agreement.

Under head coach Xavi, Barcelona experienced an inconsistent season. In La Liga, they finished second behind Real Madrid, failing to defend their previous season’s title. They also finished as runners-up in the Supercopa de España, losing to Real Madrid in the final, and were eliminated by Athletic Bilbao in the quarter-finals of the Copa del Rey. In the UEFA Champions League, Barcelona finished first in their group and reached the knockout stage for the first time in three seasons. They defeated Napoli in the round of 16 before being eliminated by Paris Saint-Germain in the quarter-finals.

Despite finishing the campaign without a trophy, they secured qualification for the following season’s Supercopa de España. The season was Xavi’s last as head coach, with Hansi Flick appointed as his successor.

== Kits ==
- Supplier: Nike
- Sponsors: Spotify (front) (Note: For El Clásico match disputed on 28 October 2023, the emblem of the British band The Rolling Stones replaced the Spotify logo to celebrate the release of the "Hackney Diamonds" new album. On 21 April 2024, coinciding with the league's El Clásico at the Santiago Bernabéu, the Spotify logo was replaced by that of the Colombian singer Karol G.) / AMBILIGHT TV (left sleeve) / UNHCR – The UN Refugee Agency (back)

Home (Note: The home shirt features classic broad blaugrana stripes. The crest includes a semi-transparent diamond, inspired by the logo of the team who played the first ever Barça women's football match at the Camp Nou in 1970.)	Home alt.	Away (Note: The away kit is predominantly white, inspired by a kit worn by Johan Cruyff in the 1970s. The crest is that used in 1978.)	Third (Note: The third kit is intended as a visual metaphor of the "Barça DNA". Using traditional Barça away aqua blue, a weave pattern in blaugrana evokes DNA. Barça DNA is the history, playing style, and development of young talent at the club.)
Fourth (Note: The fourth kit is the same as the previous season; it features the Catalan senyera flag on the chest horizontally to pay tribute to the club's Catalan identity.)	Goalkeeper 1	Goalkeeper 2	Goalkeeper 3

== Season overview ==
=== Pre-season ===
On 12 May, Barcelona announced they would be touring the United States to participate in the pre-season Soccer Champions Tour, with four friendly matches against Juventus in San Francisco on 22 July, Arsenal in Los Angeles on 26 July, Real Madrid in Dallas on 29 July, and Milan in Las Vegas on 1 August.

On 24 May, Jordi Alba and the club reached a mutual agreement to terminate the final year of his contract, bringing his time at Barcelona to an end.

On 8 June, Barcelona announced that the pre-season would start with the players medical examinations on 10 July.

On 26 June, Barcelona announced the signing of İlkay Gündoğan, on a two-year deal until 2025. Four days later, the club announced that they had reached an agreement to sever ties with Samuel Umtiti.

On 5 July, the club announced the signing of Iñigo Martínez, on a two-year deal until 2025. A week later, the club announced that they had reached an agreement with Athletico Paranaense for the transfer of Brazilian striker Vitor Roque, with the player scheduled to arrive in the summer of 2024, and that they would face Tottenham Hotspur on 8 August to compete for the Joan Gamper Trophy at the Estadi Olímpic Lluís Companys.

On 18 July, Pablo Torre was loaned to Girona for the rest of the season, and the following day the club announced the signing of Oriol Romeu, on a three-year contract until 2026.

On 22 July, the club announced that their match against Juventus on the same date would be cancelled due to a viral gastroenteritis outbreak among a significant part of the Barcelona squad.

On 26 July, Barcelona started their pre-season with 5–3 defeat to Arsenal. Robert Lewandowski, Raphinha and Ferran Torres were on the scoresheet for the team. The next day, Álex Collado departed for Real Betis for an undisclosed fee. Two days after that, Barcelona got their first win of the pre-season, after they defeated Real Madrid 3–0 in the El Clásico thanks to goals from Ousmane Dembélé, Fermín López and Ferran Torres; the same day, Nico González was sold to Porto for €8.5 million.

=== August ===
On 1 August, Barcelona defeated Milan 0–1 thanks to a goal from Ansu Fati, with Julián Araujo loaned to Las Palmas for the rest of the season the same day.

On 8 August, Barcelona concluded the pre-season with a 4–2 win against Tottenham Hotspur to retain Joan Gamper Trophy. The goals were scored by Robert Lewandowski, Ferran Torres, Ansu Fati and Abde Ezzalzouli, while Frenkie de Jong was chosen as Player of the match. The next day, the club announced the departure of Franck Kessié to Saudi club Al-Ahli for €12.5 million. He played 43 matches for the club and scored three goals.

On 12 August, Ousmane Dembélé was sold to Paris Saint-Germain for €50.4 million, and the following day, Barcelona were held to a goalless draw by Getafe CF at the Coliseum. In an extremely physical match, both teams were reduced to ten men when Raphinha and Jamie Mata were sent off in the 42nd and 57th minutes respectively. The match ended with late drama when Barcelona were denied a penalty for a foul on Ronald Araujo right at the end. İlkay Gündoğan made his debut for the club in this match.

On 20 August, Barcelona got their first win of the season, winning 2–0 against Cádiz, with the goals coming from Pedri and Ferran Torres. The next day, Sergiño Dest was loaned to PSV Eindhoven for the rest of the season.

On 27 August, Barcelona defeated Villarreal 3–4 in a seven-goal thriller. Gavi, Frenkie de Jong and Ferran Torres scored a goal each, along with Robert Lewandowski who scored his first goal of the season and sealed the win in the 71st minute. Fermín López made his debut in the match. Four days later, the draw for the 2023–24 UEFA Champions League group stage was held at the Grimaldi Forum in Monaco. Barcelona was drawn into Group H, alongside its opponents Porto, Shakhtar Donetsk and debutants Royal Antwerp.

=== September ===
On 1 September, Barcelona confirmed the signings of forward João Félix and defender João Cancelo on loan until the end of the season. On the same day the club also announced that they had sold Abde Ezzalzouli to Real Betis for €7,5 million, and confirmed that they had loaned out three players until the end of the season: Clément Lenglet to Aston Villa, Ansu Fati to Brighton and Eric García to Girona.

On 3 September, the team got a hard-fought 1–2 away win against Osasuna, with Jules Koundé and Robert Lewandowski scoring the goals. New signings João Félix, João Cancelo and Iñigo Martínez made their debuts during the match. Gavi made his 100th appearance for Barcelona, thus becoming the youngest Barça player ever to become a centenarian, reaching the figure at the age of 19 years and 27 days.

On 5 September, the nominees for the Golden Boy award were announced. Three Barcelona players were nominated: Pedri, Gavi and Alejandro Balde. On the next day, the nominees for the 2023 Ballon d'Or were announced. Robert Lewandowski and İlkay Gündoğan were nominated for the Ballon d'Or award. Barcelona had the most players nominated for the Kopa Trophy than any other club, with Alejandro Balde and holders of the award Pedri and Gavi representing the club. While Marc-André ter Stegen was nominated for the Yashin Trophy.

On 16 September, Barcelona got a comfortable 5–0 win against Real Betis. Both João Félix and João Cancelo scored their first goals for the club, Robert Lewandowski and Raphinha both scored a goal each, and the other goal was scored by Ferran Torres, who converted a free-kick in the 62nd minute, scoring the club's first free-kick goal in over two years, since Lionel Messi scored a free-kick in a league win against Valencia back in May of 2021.

On 19 September, the team started their Champions League campaign with a dominant 5–0 against Royal Antwerp. João Félix scored twice, Robert Lewandowski and Gavi scored a goal each and the other goal was an own goal from Royal Antwerp's defender Jelle Bataille. Lewandowski became the third player in history behind Lionel Messi and Cristiano Ronaldo to reach 100 goals in UEFA club competitions.

On 23 September, Barcelona completed an epic comeback defeating Celta Vigo 3–2, after they were trailing 0–2 until the 81st minute, when Robert Lewandowski scored his first goal of the match and just four minutes later he scored his second, João Cancelo scored the last goal of the match in the 89th minute to complete the dramatic comeback. It's the first time in club's history in the league that the team has been able to overcome a two-goal deficit after the 80th minute.

On 26 September, Barcelona were held to a 2–2 draw away at Mallorca. Raphinha scored one goal and Fermín López scored his first goal for the club. Three days later, Barcelona ended the month with a 1–0 win against Sevilla thanks to an own goal scored by Sevilla's defender Sergio Ramos.

=== October ===
On 4 October, Barcelona defeated Porto 0–1 away thanks to a Ferran Torres goal at the end of the first half. This match was Xavi's 100th match in charge as a coach, during which time the team has amassed 63 wins and has scored 191 goals. With his start in this match, Lamine Yamal became the youngest player ever to start a Champions League match, just three days younger than Celestine Babayaro was in November 1994 when he started a game for Anderlecht.

On 8 October, Barcelona were held to a 2–2 draw against Granada away. Sergi Roberto and Lamine Yamal scored a goal each, with the latter netting his first goal for the club and becoming the youngest La Liga goalscorer ever aged 16 years and 87 days, breaking the record held by Malaga's Fabrice Olinga, who scored against Celta Vigo in 2012 aged 16 years and 98 days.

After the international break, Barcelona defeated Athletic Bilbao 1–0 on 22 October, thanks to a goal from teenage debutant Marc Guiu who scored his first goal for the club just 23 seconds after coming on as a substitute, and became the youngest Barcelona player to debut with a goal in La Liga in the 21st century at just 17 years and 291 days.

On 25 October, the team beat Shakhtar Donetsk 2–1 thanks to goals from Ferran Torres and Fermín López.

On 28 October, Barcelona suffered their first defeat of the season after they were defeated 1–2 by Real Madrid in the first El Clásico of the season. İlkay Gündoğan scored his first goal for the club.

=== November ===
On 4 November, Barcelona got a narrow 0–1 away win against Real Sociedad thanks to a last minute header from Ronald Araújo.

On 7 November, Barcelona suffered a narrow 1–0 defeat against Shakhtar Donetsk under controversial circumstances after three penalties for the team were denied by Video Assistant Referee (VAR), of which two were handballs inside the box which were not called and the third was a foul on João Félix inside the penalty area which was also not given even after VAR checked the incident.

On 12 November, the team defeated Deportivo Alavés 2–1 thanks to a Robert Lewandowski brace in the second half.

On 25 November, Barcelona were held to a 1–1 draw against Rayo Vallecano, with the only goal for the Blaugrana being an own goal by Rayo Vallecano's defender Florian Lejeune.

Barcelona concluded the month with a decisive 2–1 win against Porto on 28 November. The win secured Barcelona's advance to the knockout stage for the first time in three years after they had failed to advance in the previous two seasons; the win also confirmed the team as the group winners. João Cancelo and João Félix scored the goals for the team.

=== December ===
On 3 December, Barcelona got a hard-fought 1–0 win over Atlético Madrid, with João Félix scoring the only goal of the match.

On 10 December, Barcelona suffered their second league defeat of the season, losing 2–4 to Girona, with Robert Lewandowski and İlkay Gündoğan scoring the only goals for the team.

Three days later, Barcelona suffered a 3–2 loss against Antwerp in the last matchday of the group stage. Barcelona and Porto finished the group with 12 points each, however Barcelona finished first in the group because of their better head-to-head record against Porto. Ferran Torres and Marc Guiu got on the scoresheet for the team. Héctor Fort made his debut in the match.

On 16 December, Barcelona drew 1–1 against Valencia, with João Félix scoring the only goal for the Catalans.

Barcelona got a hard-fought 3–2 victory over Almería in their last competitive match of the year on 20 December, thanks to a brace from Sergi Roberto and a goal from Raphinha.

Barcelona concluded the year with a 2–3 defeat in a friendly against Mexican side Club América on 21 December.

On 27 December, Barcelona officially confirmed the acceleration of Vitor Roque's arrival from Athletico Paranaense, announcing the striker's immediate integration into the first-team squad ahead of the winter transfer window.

=== January ===
On 4 January, Barcelona started the new year with a comeback win, defeating Las Palmas 1–2 after going 1–0 down in the 12th minute. Ferran Torres scored the equaliser in the 55th minute, while İlkay Gündoğan scored the winning goal in the 93rd minute with a penalty kick. New signing Vitor Roque made his debut with the team.

On 7 January, Barcelona defeated Barbastro 2–3 and advanced to the Copa del Rey round of 16 thanks to goals from López, Raphinha and Lewandowski.

On 11 January, Barcelona advanced to the 2024 Supercopa de España final after they defeated Osasuna 2–0 in the semi-final thanks to goals from Lewandowski and Yamal. With his appearance and goal in the 93rd minute, Yamal became the youngest player to take part in the competition and the youngest scorer at the age of 16 years and 182 days, beating the previous record for the 21st century set by Ansu Fati at the age of 17 years and 70 days.

On 14 January, Barcelona suffered a 4–1 defeat against Real Madrid in the Supercopa final with Lewandowski scoring the only goal for the team.

On 18 January, the team advanced to the Copa del Rey quarter-finals after they defeated Unionistas 1–3, with the goals coming from Torres, Koundé and Balde. Pau Cubarsí made his debut in the match, which also saw Frenkie de Jong reach his 200th appearance for Barcelona.

Barcelona returned to league action on 21 January, winning 2–4 against Real Betis. Ferran Torres marked his 100th appearance for the club with a hat-trick, with the other goal coming from João Félix.

On 24 January, Barcelona were eliminated from the Copa del Rey after they suffered a 4–2 away defeat against Athletic Bilbao in the quarter-finals. Lewandowski and Yamal scored the only goals for the team.

On 27 January, Barcelona suffered a dramatic 3–5 defeat against Villarreal in controversial circumstances after they had a penalty overturned by VAR. In the post-match press conference, Barcelona manager Xavi announced his decision to step down as the club's head coach at the end of the season, saying: "I took this decision days ago, I already knew it but today was the moment to announce it. I think this decision will help unblocking the team and the mood in here. I think the club needs a change of dynamic and I told the president Joan Laporta. As a fan, thinking about the club and the players, I think they will be freed up and will be calmer. I have always wanted to be a solution for Barça, as I was two years and three months ago – but thinking with my heart, I think it is best to leave office on 30 June. I thank the president for his trust. We need a change of course for the good of the club and this will de-escalate the situation surrounding Barça. In these four months I will give everything. I'll try to give my all to try and win the league. I think we can have a good season and hopefully the dynamic will change."

Barcelona finished the month with a 1–0 win over Osasuna on 31 January. Vitor Roque scored his for goal for the club a minute after coming on as a substitute.

=== February ===
On 3 February, Barcelona got a 1–3 away win over Deportivo Alavés thanks to goals from Lewandowski, Gündoğan and Vitor Roque.

On 11 February, the team got held to a 3–3 draw against Granada, with Yamal scoring a brace and Lewandowski scoring once.

On 17 February, Barcelona got a dramatic 1–2 away win against Celta Vigo thanks to a Lewandowski brace, who scored the winning goal in the 97th minute with a penalty kick. With this brace, Lewandowski reached 50 goals with Barcelona, achieving this milestone in 79 matches.

On 21 February, Barcelona drew 1–1 away against Napoli in the first leg of the Champions League Round of 16. Lewandowski scored the team's only goal.

Barcelona ended the month with a comfortable 4–0 win against Getafe on 24 February, with the goals coming from Raphinha, Félix, De Jong and Fermín. De Jong's goal scored in the 61st minute was Barcelona's 11,000th goal in the club's history in competitive matches.

=== March ===
On 3 March, Barcelona drew 0–0 against Athletic Bilbao in a match that saw both Frenkie de Jong and Pedri suffer injuries.

On 8 March, the team got a 1–0 win over Mallorca thanks to a Yamal goal. Marc-André ter Stegen made his 400th appearance for the club.

On 12 March, Barcelona advanced to the Champions League quarter-finals for the first time since the 2019–20 season after defeating Napoli 3–1 on the night and 4–2 on aggregate, with the goals coming from Fermín, Cancelo and Lewandowski. Barcelona became the first team in Champions League history to start two players aged 17 or under in a Champions League knockout match by starting both Yamal and Champions League debutant Pau Cubarsí, the latter of whom became the youngest player to make his debut as a starter in the Champions League knockout stage at 17 years and 50 days and was also named Man of the match.

On 17 March, Barcelona defeated Atlético Madrid 0–3 thanks to goals from Félix, Lewandowski and Fermín and climbed to second place in the league standings.

After the international break, the team got a 1–0 win against Las Palmas on 30 March, with the goal coming from Raphinha.

=== April ===
On 10 April, Barcelona got a dramatic and hard-fought 2–3 away win against Paris Saint-Germain in the first leg of the Champions League quarter-final thanks to a brace from Raphinha, with the winning goal coming from Andreas Christensen who scored on his 28th birthday.

Three days later, the team got a 0–1 away win over Cádiz thanks to a brilliant bicycle kick goal from Félix and an amazing defensive performance from Ter Stegen.

On 16 April, Barcelona's Champions League journey ended after they suffered a 1–4 defeat in the second leg of the quarter-finals against Paris Saint-Germain (4–6 on aggregate). Despite Barcelona's promising start thanks to a Raphinha goal, the pivotal moment of Araujo's red card in the 29th minute altered the trajectory of the match and ultimately swung the momentum decisively in PSG's favour.

On 21 April, Barcelona suffered a 3–2 defeat against Real Madrid in a hard-fought match. It was marked by a controversial VAR decision when in the 26th minute Yamal guided the ball towards the goal and Real Madrid's goalkeeper Lunin cleared the ball from an inside goal perspective. Four minutes later, after being checked by the VAR, the result was deemed inconclusive because of the lack of the goal-line technology in La Liga and therefore the goal was not allowed.

On 25 April, in a press conference Xavi announced that he had decided to remain Barcelona's head coach and honour his contract that expires in June 2025, reversing his decision to leave the club at the end of this season that he had announced in January, saying that he wanted to "continue with a project that isn't finished and that must be continued... there are several reasons, but the main one was to ensure the stability of the club and to continue building a winning team."

On the same day, the club commemorated the 10th anniversary of the death of Barça's former coach Tito Vilanova by releasing a 2020 Barça Studios documentary about the coach titled "100x100 TITO on YouTube" on the club's official channel. He is remembered as the only Barcelona coach to reach 100 points in a league season and his name lives on at the club with the main training pitch named after him at the Ciutat Esportiva Joan Gamper.

Barcelona ended the month with a 4–2 comeback victory against Valencia on 29 April, with Fermín scoring a goal and Lewandowski scoring a second half hat-trick which included a free kick goal in the last minute of the match.

=== May ===
On 4 May, Barcelona suffered a 4–2 defeat against Girona, with Christensen and Lewandowski scoring the only goals for the team. On 13 May, the team got a 2–0 win against Real Sociedad thanks to goals from Yamal and Raphinha, which took the team back to second place in the league table. Three days later, Barcelona got a 0–2 away win against Almería thanks to a brace from Fermín López who reached ten goals with the club.

On 19 May, Barcelona defeated Rayo Vallecano 3–0 in their last home match of the season thanks to a brace from Pedri and a goal from Lewandowski. With this win, the team secured second place in the league and qualified for the next season's Supercopa de España. It was a match of milestones as Araújo made his 150th appearance for the club, with both Gündoğan and Yamal playing their 50th match for the club, making Yamal the youngest player in the club's history to reach 50 appearances at the age of 16 years, 10 months and six days, beating the previous record held by Bojan Krkić who made his 50th appearance at the age of 18 years and three days in August 2008.

On 26 May, Barcelona defeated Sevilla 1–2 in their last match of the season thanks to goals from Robert Lewandowski and Fermín López. It was Xavi's last match as the head coach of the club after it was announced two days earlier that he would not continue as the manager next season, reversing the club's last month decision to continue with Xavi as the head coach.

On 29 May, Barcelona announced that the German manager Hansi Flick would become the team's head coach starting next season with a contract until 30 June 2026.

== Management team ==
Position	Name
Head coach	(Spain) Xavi
Assistant coaches	(Spain) Òscar Hernández, (Spain) Sergio Alegre
Goalkeeping coach	(Spain) José Ramón de la Fuente
Fitness coaches	(Spain) Iván Torres, (Spain) Andrés Martín, (Spain) Edu Pons, (Spain) David Pozos, (Spain) Milos Mallol
Analysts	(Spain) Toni Lobo, (Spain) David Prats, (Spain) Sergio Garcia, (Spain) Eloiy Jordan, (Spain) Joan Barbarà

- Source: FC Barcelona Annual Report 2023/24

== Players ==
=== First team ===
N	Pos.	Nat.	Name	Age	EU	Since	App	Goals	Ends	Transfer fee	Notes
Goalkeepers
1	GK	(Germany)	Marc-André ter Stegen (vice captain)	32	EU	2014	413	0	2028	€12M	
13	GK	(Spain)	Iñaki Peña	25	EU	2021	22	0	2026	Youth system	From La Masia
Defenders
2	DF	(Portugal)	João Cancelo	29	EU	2023	42	4	2024	Loan	
3	DF	(Spain)	Alejandro Balde	20	EU	2022	79	2	2028	Youth system	From La Masia
4	DF	(Uruguay)	Ronald Araújo (3rd captain)	25	EU	2019	150	8	2026	€1.7M	
5	DF	(Spain)	Iñigo Martínez	33	EU	2023	25	0	2025	Free	
15	DF	(Denmark)	Andreas Christensen	28	EU	2022	74	4	2026	Free	
17	DF	(Spain)	Marcos Alonso	33	EU	2022	45	3	2024	Free	
23	DF	(France)	Jules Koundé	25	EU	2022	88	3	2027	€50M	
Midfielders
6	MF	(Spain)	Gavi	19	EU	2021	111	7	2026	Youth system	From La Masia
8	MF	(Spain)	Pedri	21	EU	2020	143	20	2026	€5M	
16/32 (Note: Fermín wore number 32 in La Liga, Copa del Rey and Supercopa de España matches played from 13 August until 27 January. Number 32 was used in Champions League matches until 16 April.)	MF	(Spain)	Fermín López	21	EU	2023	42	11	2027	Youth system	From La Masia
18	MF	(Spain)	Oriol Romeu	32	EU	2023	39	0	2026	€3.4M	From La Masia
20	MF	(Spain)	Sergi Roberto (captain)	32	EU	2010	373	19	2024	Youth system	From La Masia
21	MF	(Netherlands)	Frenkie de Jong (4th captain)	27	EU	2019	213	17	2026	€75M	
22	MF	(Germany)	İlkay Gündoğan	33	EU	2023	51	5	2025	Free	
Forwards
7	FW	(Spain)	Ferran Torres	24	EU	2021 (Winter)	113	25	2027	€55M	
9	FW	(Poland)	Robert Lewandowski	35	EU	2022	95	59	2026	€45M	
11	FW	(Brazil)	Raphinha	27	EU	2022	87	20	2027	€58M	
14	FW	(Portugal)	João Félix	24	EU	2023	44	10	2024	Loan	
19	FW	(Brazil)	Vitor Roque	19	Non-EU	2024 (Winter)	16	2	2031	€30M	

- Source: FCBarcelona.com, LaLiga.com and UEFA.com
- Ordered by squad number.

=== Reserve team ===
N	Pos.	Nat.	Name	Age	EU	Since	App	Goals	Ends	Transfer fee	Notes
26	GK	(Spain)	Ander Astralaga	20	EU	2022	0	0	2025	Youth system	
27	FW	(Spain)	Lamine Yamal	16	EU	2023	51	7	2026	Youth system	
29	FW	(Spain)	Ángel Alarcón	20	EU	2023	5	0	2024	Youth system	
30	MF	(Spain)	Marc Casadó	20	EU	2022	5	0	2024	Youth system	
31	GK	(United States)	Diego Kochen	18	Non-EU	2023	0	0	2025	Youth system	
33	DF	(Spain)	Pau Cubarsí	17	EU	2023	24	0	2027	Youth system	
34	MF	(Spain)	Aleix Garrido	20	EU	2023	1	0	2026	Youth system	
35	MF	(Spain)	Unai Hernández	19	EU	2023	0	0	2025	Youth system	
36	GK	(Hungary)	Áron Yaakobishvili	18	EU	2023	0	0	2025	Youth system	
37	FW	(Spain)	Pau Víctor	22	EU	2023	0	0	2024	Loan	
38	FW	(Spain)	Marc Guiu	18	EU	2023	7	2	2026	Youth system	
39	DF	(Spain)	Héctor Fort	17	EU	2023	10	0	2026	Youth system	
40	MF	(Spain)	Pau Prim	18	EU	2023	0	0	2025	Youth system	
41	DF	(Senegal)	Mikayil Faye	19	Non-EU	2023	0	0	2027	€1.5M	

- Source: FCBarcelona.com, LaLiga.com and UEFA.com
- Ordered by squad number.

=== Contract renewals ===
No.	Pos.	Nat.	Name	Date	Until	Source
1	GK	(Germany)	Marc-André ter Stegen	25 August 2023	30 June 2028	
3	DF	(Spain)	Alejandro Balde	20 September 2023	30 June 2028	
Coach		(Spain)	Xavi	22 September 2023	30 June 2025	

== Transfers ==
=== In ===
No.	Pos.	Player	Transfer from	Fee	Date	Source
Summer
—	DF	(France) Clément Lenglet	(England) Tottenham Hotspur	Loan return	1 July 2023	
—	DF	(United States) Sergiño Dest	(Italy) Milan	Loan return	1 July 2023	
—	MF	(Spain) Álex Collado	Elche	Loan return	1 July 2023	
—	MF	(Spain) Nico González	Valencia	Loan return	1 July 2023	
16	FW	(Morocco) Abde Ezzalzouli	Osasuna	Loan return	1 July 2023	
22	MF	(Germany) İlkay Gündoğan	(England) Manchester City	Free transfer	1 July 2023	
5	DF	(Spain) Iñigo Martínez	Athletic Bilbao	Free transfer	5 July 2023	
18	MF	(Spain) Oriol Romeu	Girona	€3.4 million	19 July 2023	
Winter
19	FW	(Brazil) Vitor Roque	(Brazil) Athletico Paranaense	€30 million (Note: Fee may eventually rise to €61 million.)	1 January 2024 (Note: Deal agreed on 12 July 2023.)	
Total				€33.4 million		

=== Out ===
No.	Pos.	Player	Transfer to	Fee	Date	Source
5	MF	(Spain) Sergio Busquets	(United States) Inter Miami	End of contract	1 July 2023	
18	DF	(Spain) Jordi Alba	(United States) Inter Miami	Released	1 July 2023	
—	DF	(France) Samuel Umtiti	(France) Lille	Released	1 July 2023	
—	MF	(Spain) Álex Collado	Real Betis	Undisclosed	27 July 2023	
—	MF	(Spain) Nico González	(Portugal) Porto	€8,500,000	29 July 2023	
19	MF	(Ivory Coast) Franck Kessié	(Saudi Arabia) Al-Ahli	€12,500,000	9 August 2023	
7	FW	(France) Ousmane Dembélé	(France) Paris Saint-Germain	€50,400,000	12 August 2023	
16	FW	(Morocco) Abde Ezzalzouli	Real Betis	€7,500,000	1 September 2023	
Total				€78.9 million		

=== Loans in ===
No.	Pos.	Player	Loaned from	Fee	Date	On loan until	Source
14	FW	(Portugal) João Félix	Atlético Madrid	None	1 September 2023	End of season	
2	DF	(Portugal) João Cancelo	(England) Manchester City	Undisclosed	1 September 2023	End of season	
Total				€0			

=== Loans out ===
No.	Pos.	Player	Loaned to	Fee	Date	On loan until	Source
32	MF	(Spain) Pablo Torre	Girona	None	18 July 2023	End of season	
—	DF	(Mexico) Julián Araujo	Las Palmas	None	1 August 2023	End of season	
2	DF	(United States) Sergiño Dest	(Netherlands) PSV Eindhoven	None	21 August 2023	End of season	
12	DF	(France) Clément Lenglet	(England) Aston Villa	None	1 September 2023	End of season	
10	FW	(Spain) Ansu Fati	(England) Brighton & Hove Albion	None	1 September 2023	End of season	
24	DF	(Spain) Eric García	Girona	None	1 September 2023	End of season	
Total				€0			

=== Transfer summary ===
Undisclosed fees are not included in the transfer totals.

Expenditure ▼

Summer: €3,400,000

Winter: €30,000,000

Total expenditure: €33,400,000

Income ▲

Summer: €78,900,000

Winter: €0,000,000

Total income: €78,900,000

Net totals

Summer: ▲€75,500,000

Winter: ▼€30,000,000

Total: ▲€45,500,000

== Pre-season and friendlies ==
Win Draw Loss Fixtures

22 July 2023 Soccer Champions Tour 2023	Barcelona (Spain)	Cancelled	(Italy) Juventus	Santa Clara, United States
19:30 PDT (UTC−7)				Stadium: Levi's Stadium
Note: The match was cancelled due to a viral gastroenteritis outbreak among a significant part of the Barcelona squad.

26 July 2023 Soccer Champions Tour 2023	Arsenal (England)	5–3	(Spain) Barcelona	Inglewood, United States
20:06 PDT (UTC−7)	Saka 13', (penalty missed) 22'; Trossard (yellow card) 27', (goal) 55', 78'; Havertz (yellow card) 36', (goal) 43'; White (yellow card) 41'; Vieira 89'	Report	Lewandowski 7'; Raphinha 34'; Araújo (yellow card) 37'; Torres 88'	Stadium: SoFi Stadium; Attendance: 70,223; Referee: Alex Chilowicz (United States)

29 July 2023 Soccer Champions Tour 2023	Barcelona (Spain)	3–0	(Spain) Real Madrid	Arlington, United States
16:00 CDT (UTC−5)	Dembélé 15'; De Jong (yellow card) 41'; Koundé (yellow card) 62'; Romeu (yellow card) 71'; López 85'; Torres 90+1'	Report	Vinícius (penalty missed) 20'; Tchouaméni (yellow card) 25'; Camavinga (yellow card) 34'; Carvajal (yellow card) 45+3'; Alaba (yellow card) 81'	Stadium: AT&T Stadium; Attendance: 82,026; Referee: Allen Chapman (United States)

1 August 2023 Soccer Champions Tour 2023	Milan (Italy)	0–1	(Spain) Barcelona	Paradise, United States
20:00 PDT (UTC−7)	Loftus-Cheek (yellow card) 29'; Reijnders (yellow card) 44'	Report	Alonso (yellow card) 7'; Fati 55'	Stadium: Allegiant Stadium; Attendance: 38,986; Referee: Alex Chilowicz (United States)

8 August 2023 Trofeu Joan Gamper	Barcelona (Spain)	4–2	(England) Tottenham Hotspur	Barcelona, Spain
20:00 CEST (UTC+2)	Lewandowski 3'; Torres 81'; Fati 90'; Ezzalzouli 90+2'	Report	Skipp 24', 36'; Bissouma (yellow card) 26'	Stadium: Estadi Olímpic Lluís Companys; Attendance: 35,224; Referee: Jesús Gil Manzano (Spain)

21 December 2023 The Match	Barcelona (Spain)	2–3	(Mexico) América	Dallas, United States
20:00 CST (UTC−6)	Yamal 6'; Guiu 28'; López (yellow card) 85'	Report	Quiñones 12', 50'; Martín 82'	Stadium: Cotton Bowl; Attendance: 30,000; Referee: Elton García (United States)

== Competitions ==
=== Overall record ===
Competition	First match	Last match	Starting round	Final position	Record							
Competition	First match	Last match	Starting round	Final position	Pld	W	D	L	GF	GA	GD	Win %
La Liga	13 August 2023	26 May 2024	Matchday 1	2nd	38	26	7	5	79	44	+35	68.42
Copa del Rey	7 January 2024	24 January 2024	Round of 32	Quarter-finals	3	2	0	1	8	7	+1	66.67
Supercopa de España	11 January 2024	14 January 2024	Semi-finals	Runners-up	2	1	0	1	3	4	−1	50.00
UEFA Champions League	19 September 2023	16 April 2024	Group stage	Quarter-finals	10	6	1	3	20	14	+6	60.00
Total					53	35	8	10	110	69	+41	66.04

Source: Soccerway

=== La Liga ===
==== League table ====
Pos	Team	Pld	W	D	L	GF	GA	GD	Pts	Qualification or relegation
1	Real Madrid (C)	38	29	8	1	87	26	+61	95	Qualification for the Champions League league phase
2	Barcelona	38	26	7	5	79	44	+35	85	Qualification for the Champions League league phase
3	Girona	38	25	6	7	85	46	+39	81	Qualification for the Champions League league phase
4	Atlético Madrid	38	24	4	10	70	43	+27	76	Qualification for the Champions League league phase
5	Athletic Bilbao	38	19	11	8	61	37	+24	68	Qualification for the Europa League league phase (Note: Since the winners of the 2023–24 Copa del Rey, Athletic Bilbao, qualified for European competition based on league position, the Europa League berth awarded to the Copa del Rey winners was passed to the sixth-placed team, and the Conference League berth awarded to the sixth-placed team was passed to the seventh-placed team.)

Source: LaLiga EA Sports
Rules for classification: 1) Points; 2) Head-to-head points; 3) Head-to-head goal difference; 4) Goal difference; 5) Goals scored; 6) Fair-play points
(Note: Head-to-head record is used only after all the matches between the teams in question have been played)
(C) Champions

==== Results summary ====
Overall								Home						Away					
Pld	W	D	L	GF	GA	GD	Pts	W	D	L	GF	GA	GD	W	D	L	GF	GA	GD
38	26	7	5	79	44	+35	85	15	1	3	43	21	+22	11	6	2	36	23	+13

Source: La Liga

==== Results by round ====
Round	1	2	3	4	5	6	7	8	9	10	11	12	13	14	15	16	17	18	19	20	21	22	23	24	25	26	27	28	29	30	31	32	33	34	35	36	37	38
Ground	A	H	A	A	H	H	A	H	A	H	H	A	H	A	H	H	A	H	A	H	A	H	A	H	A	H	A	H	A	H	A	A	H	A	H	A	H	A
Result	D	W	W	W	W	W	D	W	D	W	L	W	W	D	W	L	D	W	W	W	W	L	W	D	W	W	D	W	W	W	W	L	W	L	W	W	W	W
Position	11	6	4	3	2	1	3	2	3	3	4	3	3	4	3	4	3	3	3	3	3	3	3	3	3	3	3	3	2	2	2	2	2	3	2	2	2	2

Source: La Liga
A = Away; H = Home; W = Win; D = Draw; L = Loss

==== Matches ====
The league fixtures were announced on 22 June 2023.

13 August 2023 1	Getafe	0–0	Barcelona	Getafe
21:30 CEST (UTC+2)	Mitrović (yellow card) 15'; Mata (yellow card) 31' (yellow-red card) 57'; Aleñá (yellow card) 38'; Suárez (yellow card) 82'; Lozano (yellow card) 84'; Djené (yellow card) 90+1'; Portu (yellow card) 90+15'	Report	Raphinha (yellow card) 38', (red card) 42'; Gavi (yellow card) 90+11'	Stadium: Coliseum Alfonso Pérez; Attendance: 13,410; Referee: César Soto Grado

20 August 2023 2	Barcelona	2–0	Cádiz	Barcelona
19:30 CEST (UTC+2)	De Jong (yellow card) 26'; Ter Stegen (yellow card) 26'; Gavi (yellow card) 45+6'; Pedri (yellow card) 73', (goal) 82'; Torres 90+4'	Report	Alejo (yellow card) 14'; San Emeterio (yellow card) 45+2'; J. Hernández (yellow card) 90+3'	Stadium: Estadi Olímpic Lluís Companys; Attendance: 39,603; Referee: Alejandro Muñiz Ruiz

27 August 2023 3	Villarreal	3–4	Barcelona	Villarreal
17:30 CEST (UTC+2)	Foyth 26', (yellow card) 45+6'; Sørloth 40'; Baena 50'; Terrats (yellow card) 57'; Gabbia (yellow card) 80'	Report	Gavi 12'; De Jong 15'; Yamal (yellow card) 44'; Lewandowski (yellow card) 45+6', (goal) 71'; Torres 68'; García (yellow card) 82'	Stadium: Estadio de la Cerámica; Attendance: 21,679; Referee: Alejandro Hernández Hernández

3 September 2023 4	Osasuna	1–2	Barcelona	Pamplona
21:00 CEST (UTC+2)	Areso (yellow card) 41'; Ávila 76'; Catena (red card) 84'	Report	Lewandowski (yellow card) 33', (goal) 85' (pen.); Koundé 45+1'; De Jong (yellow card) 83'; Balde (yellow card) 90+1'	Stadium: El Sadar; Attendance: 21,966; Referee: Miguel Ángel Ortiz Arias

16 September 2023 5	Barcelona	5–0	Real Betis	Barcelona
21:00 CEST (UTC+2)	Félix 25'; Lewandowski 32'; Torres 62'; Raphinha 66'; Cancelo 81'; Martínez (yellow card) 86'	Report	Bartra (yellow card) 72'; Rodríguez (yellow card) 84'	Stadium: Estadi Olímpic Lluís Companys; Attendance: 45,055; Referee: José María Sánchez Martínez

23 September 2023 6	Barcelona	3–2	Celta Vigo	Barcelona
18:30 CEST (UTC+2)	Christensen (yellow card) 36'; Gavi (yellow card) 39'; Lewandowski 81', 85'; Cancelo 89'	Report	Larsen 19'; Núñez (yellow card) 43'; Douvikas 76'	Stadium: Estadi Olímpic Lluís Companys; Attendance: 43,272; Referee: Mario Melero López

26 September 2023 7	Mallorca	2–2	Barcelona	Palma
21:30 CEST (UTC+2)	Muriqi 8'; Abdón 45+3'; Rodríguez (yellow card) 48'; Nastasić (yellow card) 61'	Report	Romeu (yellow card) 36'; Raphinha 41'; Fermín 75'	Stadium: Visit Mallorca Estadi; Attendance: 19,938; Referee: Alejandro Muñiz Ruiz

29 September 2023 8	Barcelona	1–0	Sevilla	Barcelona
21:00 CEST (UTC+2)	Cancelo (yellow card) 45'; Ramos 76' (o.g.); Gündoğan (yellow card) 90+3'	Report	Juanlu (yellow card) 50'; Lamela (yellow card) 52'; Badé (yellow card) 89'	Stadium: Estadi Olímpic Lluís Companys; Attendance: 41,116; Referee: Miguel Ángel Ortiz Arias

8 October 2023 9	Granada	2–2	Barcelona	Granada
21:00 CEST (UTC+2)	Zaragoza 1', 29'; Miquel (yellow card) 66'; Miguel Ángel (yellow card) 68'; Vallejo (yellow card) 86'; Neva (yellow card) 90+8'	Report	Yamal 45+1'; Roberto 85'; Cancelo (yellow card) 90+8'	Stadium: Nuevo Los Cármenes; Attendance: 20,354; Referee: César Soto Grado

22 October 2023 10	Barcelona	1–0	Athletic Bilbao	Barcelona
21:00 CEST (UTC+2)	Gavi (yellow card) 16'; Romeu (yellow card) 41'; Guiu 80', (yellow card) 83'	Report	D. García (yellow card) 37'; Ares (yellow card) 73'; De Marcos (yellow card) 89'	Stadium: Estadi Olímpic Lluís Companys; Attendance: 38,194; Referee: Juan Martínez Munuera

28 October 2023 11	Barcelona	1–2	Real Madrid	Barcelona
16:15 CEST (UTC+2)	Gündoğan 6'; Fermín (yellow card) 17'; Torres (yellow card) 45+2'	Report	Carvajal (yellow card) 61'; Bellingham 68', 90+2'	Stadium: Estadi Olímpic Lluís Companys; Attendance: 50,112; Referee: Jesús Gil Manzano

4 November 2023 12	Real Sociedad	0–1	Barcelona	San Sebastián
21:00 CET (UTC+1)	Méndez (yellow card) 49'; Zubeldia (yellow card) 74'; Zubimendi (yellow card) 84'	Report	Félix (yellow card) 49'; Martínez (yellow card) 60'; Gavi (yellow card) 86'; Araújo 90+2'	Stadium: Anoeta; Attendance: 37,555; Referee: Javier Alberola Rojas

12 November 2023 13	Barcelona	2–1	Alavés	Barcelona
16:15 CET (UTC+1)	Lewandowski 53', 77' (pen.), (yellow card) 62'; Gündoğan (yellow card) 90+2'	Report	Omorodion 1'; Duarte (yellow card) 75'	Stadium: Estadi Olímpic Lluís Companys; Attendance: 38,183; Referee: Mateo Busquets Ferrer

25 November 2023 14	Rayo Vallecano	1–1	Barcelona	Madrid
14:00 CET (UTC+1)	López 39', (yellow card) 70'; Espino (yellow card) 64'; Falcao (yellow card) 90'	Report	Pedri (yellow card) 31'; Romeu (yellow card) 51'; Lejeune 82' (o.g.); Félix (yellow card) 90+3'; De Jong (yellow card) 90+4'	Stadium: Vallecas; Attendance: 14,148; Referee: José Luis Munuera Montero

3 December 2023 15	Barcelona	1–0	Atlético Madrid	Barcelona
21:00 CET (UTC+1)	Félix 28', (yellow card) 50'; Torres (yellow card) 78'; Araújo (yellow card) 79'; Cancelo (yellow card) 88'; De Jong (yellow card) 90+3'	Report	Giménez (yellow card) 31'; Witsel (yellow card) 34'; Koke (yellow card) 38'; Azpilicueta (yellow card) 47'	Stadium: Estadi Olímpic Lluís Companys; Attendance: 34,568; Referee: José María Sánchez Martínez

10 December 2023 16	Barcelona	2–4	Girona	Barcelona
21:00 CET (UTC+1)	Lewandowski 19'; Gündoğan 90+2'; Araújo (yellow card) 90+7'	Report	Dovbyk 12'; Gutiérrez 40'; Blind (yellow card) 64'; Valery 80'; Stuani 90+5', (yellow card) 90+5'	Stadium: Estadi Olímpic Lluís Companys; Attendance: 42,848; Referee: Isidro Díaz de Mera Escuderos

16 December 2023 17	Valencia	1–1	Barcelona	Valencia
21:00 CET (UTC+1)	Pérez (yellow card) 65'; Guillamón 70'	Report	Félix 55'; De Jong (yellow card) 77'; Cancelo (yellow card) 80'	Stadium: Mestalla; Attendance: 46,492; Referee: Miguel Ángel Ortiz Arias

20 December 2023 18	Barcelona	3–2	Almería	Barcelona
19:00 CET (UTC+1)	Raphinha (yellow card) 15', (goal) 33'; Christensen (yellow card) 21'; Roberto 60', 83'; Araújo (yellow card) 90'	Report	Pozo (yellow card) 5'; Baptistão 41'; Lopy (yellow card) 57'; González 71'; Baba (yellow card) 85'	Stadium: Estadi Olímpic Lluís Companys; Attendance: 34,471; Referee: Guillermo Cuadra Fernández

4 January 2024 19	Las Palmas	1–2	Barcelona	Las Palmas
21:30 CET (UTC+1)	Munir 12'; Suárez (yellow card) 58'; Coco (yellow card) 79'; Muñoz (yellow card) 88'; S. Cardona (yellow card) 90'; Sinkgraven (red card) 90+1'; Rodríguez (yellow card) 90+2'	Report	Roberto (yellow card) 20'; Torres 56'; Yamal (yellow card) 81'; Gündoğan 90+3' (pen.)	Stadium: Estadio Gran Canaria; Attendance: 31,712; Referee: Pablo González Fuertes

21 January 2024 21	Real Betis	2–4	Barcelona	Seville
18:30 CET (UTC+1)	Isco 56', 59'; Abner (yellow card) 72'	Report	Torres 21', 48', 90+2'; De Jong (yellow card) 57'; Félix 90'; Vitor Roque (yellow card) 90+6'	Stadium: Benito Villamarín; Attendance: 53,288; Referee: Jesús Gil Manzano

27 January 2024 22	Barcelona	3–5	Villarreal	Barcelona
18:30 CET (UTC+1)	Romeu (yellow card) 33'; Gündoğan 60'; Pedri 68'; Lewandowski (yellow card) 68'; Bailly 72' (o.g.); Araújo (yellow card) 89'	Report	Baena (yellow card) 16'; Gerard 41'; Akhomach 54'; Bailly (yellow card) 68'; Guedes 84'; Mosquera (yellow card) 89'; Cuenca (yellow card) 90+4'; Sørloth 90+9'; Morales 90+12'	Stadium: Estadi Olímpic Lluís Companys; Attendance: 46,229; Referee: José Luis Munuera Montero

31 January 2024 20	Barcelona	1–0	Osasuna	Barcelona
19:00 CET (UTC+1)	Pedri (yellow card) 53'; Vitor Roque 63'	Report	U. García (yellow card) 16' (yellow-red card) 67'	Stadium: Estadi Olímpic Lluís Companys; Attendance: 37,888; Referee: Jorge Figueroa Vázquez
Note: The match was originally scheduled for 13 January 2024, but was postponed due to both teams' involvement in the Supercopa de España.

3 February 2024 23	Alavés	1–3	Barcelona	Vitoria-Gasteiz
18:30 CET (UTC+1)	Omorodion (yellow card) 12', (goal) 51'; Sola (yellow card) 90+7'	Report	Lewandowski 22'; Gündoğan 49'; Vitor Roque 63', (yellow card) 67' (yellow-red card) 72'	Stadium: Mendizorrotza; Attendance: 19,480; Referee: Juan Martínez Munuera

11 February 2024 24	Barcelona	3–3	Granada	Barcelona
21:00 CET (UTC+1)	Yamal 14', 80'; Lewandowski 63'; Fermín (yellow card) 78'	Report	Ruiz (yellow card) 33'; Sánchez 43'; Pellistri 60'; Miquel 66', (yellow card) 78'	Stadium: Estadi Olímpic Lluís Companys; Attendance: 41,901; Referee: Miguel Ángel Ortiz Arias

17 February 2024 25	Celta Vigo	1–2	Barcelona	Vigo
18:30 CET (UTC+1)	Allende (yellow card) 15'; Aspas 47'	Report	Christensen (yellow card) 38'; Lewandowski 45', 90+7' (pen.); De Jong (yellow card) 90+4'; Ter Stegen (yellow card) 90+5'; Martínez (yellow card) 90+10'	Stadium: Abanca-Balaídos; Attendance: 23,096; Referee: Juan Luis Pulido Santana

24 February 2024 26	Barcelona	4–0	Getafe	Barcelona
16:15 CET (UTC+1)	Raphinha 20'; Gündoğan (yellow card) 37'; Félix 53'; De Jong 61'; Fermín 90+1'	Report	Alderete (yellow card) 37'; Djené (yellow card) 48'; Rico (yellow card) 50'; Santiago (yellow card) 90'	Stadium: Estadi Olímpic Lluís Companys; Attendance: 36,803; Referee: Alejandro Muñiz Ruiz

3 March 2024 27	Athletic Bilbao	0–0	Barcelona	Bilbao
21:00 CET (UTC+1)	D. García (yellow card) 52'; Imanol (yellow card) 65'; Berenguer (yellow card) 86'	Report	Araújo (yellow card) 32'; Christensen (yellow card) 62'; Koundé (yellow card) 88'	Stadium: San Mamés; Attendance: 50,295; Referee: Alejandro Hernández Hernández

8 March 2024 28	Barcelona	1–0	Mallorca	Barcelona
21:00 CET (UTC+1)	Gündoğan (penalty missed) 24'; Martínez (yellow card) 53'; Yamal 73'	Report	S. Costa (yellow card) 86'	Stadium: Estadi Olímpic Lluís Companys; Attendance: 38,225; Referee: Javier Iglesias Villanueva

17 March 2024 29	Atlético Madrid	0–3	Barcelona	Madrid
21:00 CET (UTC+1)	De Paul (yellow card) 46'; Savić (yellow card) 61'; Barrios (yellow card) 89'; Molina (red card) 90+2'	Report	Koundé (yellow card) 33'; Félix 38'; Lewandowski 47'; Fermín 65'	Stadium: Cívitas Metropolitano; Attendance: 68,253; Referee: José María Sánchez Martínez

30 March 2024 30	Barcelona	1–0	Las Palmas	Barcelona
21:00 CET (UTC+1)	Gündoğan (yellow card) 52'; Raphinha 59'; Roberto (yellow card) 63'; Martínez (yellow card) 64'; Lewandowski (yellow card) 81'; Cancelo (yellow card) 88'	Report	S. Cardona (yellow card) 14'; Valles (red card) 24'	Stadium: Estadi Olímpic Lluís Companys; Attendance: 46,788; Referee: Mateo Busquets Ferrer

13 April 2024 31	Cádiz	0–1	Barcelona	Cádiz
21:00 CEST (UTC+2)	Alcaraz (yellow card) 45+1'; J. Hernández (yellow card) 64'; Roger (yellow card) 85'	Report	Cubarsí (yellow card) 26'; Félix 37'; Roberto (yellow card) 45+1'; Ter Stegen (yellow card) 77'	Stadium: Nuevo Mirandilla; Attendance: 19,607; Referee: Juan Luis Pulido Santana

21 April 2024 32	Real Madrid	3–2	Barcelona	Madrid
21:00 CEST (UTC+2)	Vinícius 18', (yellow card) 75'; Camavinga (yellow card) 33'; Vázquez 73'; Modrić (yellow card) 83'; Bellingham 90+1'	Report	Christensen 6'; Fermín 69'; Koundé (yellow card) 75'; Cubarsí (yellow card) 90'	Stadium: Santiago Bernabéu; Attendance: 77,981; Referee: César Soto Grado

29 April 2024 33	Barcelona	4–2	Valencia	Barcelona
21:00 CEST (UTC+2)	Fermín 22'; Cubarsí (yellow card) 42'; Lewandowski 49', 82', 90+3'	Report	Duro 27'; Pepelu 38' (pen.); Mamardashvili (red card) 45+4'	Stadium: Estadi Olímpic Lluís Companys; Attendance: 30,167; Referee: Ricardo de Burgos Bengoetxea

4 May 2024 34	Girona	4–2	Barcelona	Girona
18:30 CEST (UTC+2)	Dovbyk 4'; Portu 65', 74'; Gutiérrez 67'	Report	Christensen 3'; Koundé (yellow card) 28'; Araújo (yellow card) 39'; Roberto (yellow card) 43'; Lewandowski 45+1' (pen.)	Stadium: Montilivi; Attendance: 14,090; Referee: Alejandro Hernández Hernández

13 May 2024 35	Barcelona	2–0	Real Sociedad	Barcelona
21:00 CEST (UTC+2)	Yamal 40'; Gündoğan (yellow card) 51'; Raphinha 90+3' (pen.), (yellow card) 90+4'	Report	Aramburu (yellow card) 57'; Pacheco (yellow card) 64'; Oyarzabal (yellow card) 90+2'	Stadium: Estadi Olímpic Lluís Companys; Attendance: 35,829; Referee: Guillermo Cuadra Fernández

16 May 2024 36	Almería	0–2	Barcelona	Almería
21:30 CEST (UTC+2)		Report	Fermín 14', 67'; Vitor Roque (yellow card) 85'	Stadium: Power Horse Stadium; Attendance: 15,543; Referee: Javier Alberola Rojas

19 May 2024 37	Barcelona	3–0	Rayo Vallecano	Barcelona
19:00 CEST (UTC+2)	Lewandowski 3'; Yamal (yellow card) 10'; Raphinha (yellow card) 31'; Cubarsí (yellow card) 37'; Pedri 72', 75'; Cancelo (yellow card) 90+2'	Report	Mumin (yellow card) 23'; Valentín (yellow card) 50'	Stadium: Estadi Olímpic Lluís Companys; Attendance: 35,823; Referee: Jesús Gil Manzano

26 May 2024 38	Sevilla	1–2	Barcelona	Seville
21:00 CEST (UTC+2)	En-Nesyri 31'; Salas (yellow card) 36'; Ocampos (yellow card) 90+3'	Report	Lewandowski 15'; Cancelo (yellow card) 49'; Fermín 59'	Stadium: Ramón Sánchez Pizjuán; Attendance: 34,888; Referee: Javier Iglesias Villanueva

=== Copa del Rey ===
Barcelona entered the tournament in the round of 32, where they defeated Barbastro 3–2 and advanced to the round of 16. In the round of 16, Barcelona defeated Unionistas 3–1 and advanced to the quarter-finals. Barcelona were eliminated from the tournament after they suffered a 4–2 away defeat against Athletic Bilbao in the quarter-finals.

7 January 2024 Round of 32	Barbastro	2–3	Barcelona	Barbastro
21:00 CET (UTC+1)	Carbonell (yellow card) 36'; De Mesa 60'; Gonpi (yellow card) 80'; Prat 90+3' (pen.)	Report	Fermín 18'; Raphinha 51'; Lewandowski 88' (pen.)	Stadium: Municipal de Deportes; Attendance: 6,000; Referee: Juan Luis Pulido Santana

18 January 2024 Round of 16	Unionistas	1–3	Barcelona	Salamanca
19:30 CET (UTC+1)	Gómez 31'; Jiménez (yellow card) 43'; Giménez (yellow card) 78'	Report	Torres 45'; Guiu (yellow card) 51'; Koundé 69'; Cubarsí (yellow card) 70'; Balde 73'	Stadium: Estadio Municipal Reina Sofía; Attendance: 6,246; Referee: Francisco José Hernández Maeso

24 January 2024 Quarter-finals	Athletic Bilbao	4–2 (a.e.t.)	Barcelona	Bilbao
21:30 CET (UTC+1)	Guruzeta 1'; Sancet (yellow card) 36', (goal) 49'; Prados (yellow card) 83'; I. Williams 105+2'; Herrera (yellow card) 109'; N. Williams 120+1', (yellow card) 120+1'	Report	Christensen (yellow card) 17'; Lewandowski 26'; Yamal 32', (yellow card) 95'; Torres (yellow card) 83'; Fort (yellow card) 84'; De Jong (yellow card) 115'; Roberto (yellow card) 117'	Stadium: San Mamés; Attendance: 50,403; Referee: José María Sánchez Martínez

=== Supercopa de España ===
Barcelona qualified for the tournament by winning the 2022–23 La Liga.

On 11 January, they beat Osasuna 2–0 in the semi-final and advanced to the 2024 Supercopa de España final. In the final, Barcelona suffered a 4–1 defeat against Real Madrid.

11 January 2024 Semi-finals	Barcelona	2–0	Osasuna	Riyadh, Saudi Arabia
22:00 SAST (UTC+3)	Lewandowski 59'; Yamal 90+3'	Report	Catena (yellow card) 32'; Muñoz (yellow card) 39'; Arnaiz (yellow card) 56'	Stadium: Al-Awwal Park; Attendance: 23,932; Referee: Alejandro Muñiz Ruiz

14 January 2024 Final	Real Madrid	4–1	Barcelona	Riyadh, Saudi Arabia
22:00 SAST (UTC+3)	Vinícius 7', 10', 39' (pen.); Bellingham (yellow card) 43'; Rüdiger (yellow card) 62'; Rodrygo 64'	Report	Lewandowski 33'; Araújo (yellow card) 37' (yellow-red card) 71'; Roberto (yellow card) 40'	Stadium: Al-Awwal Park; Attendance: 23,977; Referee: Juan Martínez Munuera

=== UEFA Champions League ===
==== Group stage ====
Barcelona, as a last season's winner of one of the highest ranked leagues in Europe, entered in Pot 1 for the group stage draw, which was held on 31 August 2023. Barcelona were drawn into Group H alongside last season's Primeira Liga runners-up Porto, Ukrainian Premier League champions Shakhtar Donetsk and Belgian Pro League champions Antwerp.

Pos	Team	Pld	W	D	L	GF	GA	GD	Pts	Qualification	BAR	POR	SHK	ANT
1	(Spain) Barcelona	6	4	0	2	12	6	+6	12 (Note: Head-to-head points: Barcelona 6, Porto 0.)	Advance to knockout phase	—	2–1	2–1	5–0
2	(Portugal) Porto	6	4	0	2	15	8	+7	12	Advance to knockout phase	0–1	—	5–3	2–0
3	(Ukraine) Shakhtar Donetsk	6	3	0	3	10	12	−2	9	Transfer to Europa League	1–0	1–3	—	1–0
4	(Belgium) Antwerp	6	1	0	5	6	17	−11	3		3–2	1–4	2–3	—

Source: UEFA
Rules for classification: Group stage tiebreakers
Notes:

19 September 2023 1	Barcelona (Spain)	5–0	(Belgium) Antwerp	Barcelona, Spain
21:00 CEST (UTC+2)	Félix 11', 66'; Lewandowski 19'; Bataille 22' (o.g.); Gavi (yellow card) 36', (goal) 54'	Report		Stadium: Estadi Olímpic Lluís Companys; Attendance: 40,989; Referee: Radu Petrescu (Romania)

4 October 2023 2	Porto (Portugal)	0–1	(Spain) Barcelona	Porto, Portugal
21:00 CEST (UTC+2)	Cardoso (yellow card) 28'	Report	Cancelo (yellow card) 13'; Araújo (yellow card) 28'; Gavi (yellow card) 37' (yellow-red card) 90+3'; Torres 45+1'; Koundé (yellow card) 47'; Félix (yellow card) 50'; Roberto (yellow card) 86'	Stadium: Estádio do Dragão; Attendance: 49,722; Referee: Anthony Taylor (England)

25 October 2023 3	Barcelona (Spain)	2–1	(Ukraine) Shakhtar Donetsk	Barcelona, Spain
18:45 CEST (UTC+2)	Torres 28', (yellow card) 43'; Fermín 36'; Balde (yellow card) 75'	Report	Kryskiv (yellow card) 50'; Sudakov 62'; Konoplya (yellow card) 72'; Bondar (yellow card) 87'	Stadium: Estadi Olímpic Lluís Companys; Attendance: 41,409; Referee: Ivan Kružliak (Slovakia)

7 November 2023 4	Shakhtar Donetsk (Ukraine)	1–0	(Spain) Barcelona	Hamburg, Germany
18:45 CET (UTC+1)	Sikan 40'; Newerton (yellow card) 90+8'	Report	Araújo (yellow card) 45+2'	Stadium: Volksparkstadion; Attendance: 49,147; Referee: Irfan Peljto (Bosnia and Herzegovina)

28 November 2023 5	Barcelona (Spain)	2–1	(Portugal) Porto	Barcelona, Spain
21:00 CET (UTC+1)	Cancelo 32'; De Jong (yellow card) 37'; Félix 57', (yellow card) 59'	Report	Pepê 30', (yellow card) 74'; Cardoso (yellow card) 36'; João Mário (yellow card) 57'	Stadium: Estadi Olímpic Lluís Companys; Attendance: 43,533; Referee: Daniele Orsato (Italy)

13 December 2023 6	Antwerp (Belgium)	3–2	(Spain) Barcelona	Antwerp, Belgium
21:00 CET (UTC+1)	Vermeeren 2'; Wijndal (yellow card) 23'; Janssen 56'; De Laet (yellow card) 90'; Ilenikhena 90+2'; Bataille (yellow card) 90+6'	Report	Torres 35', (yellow card) 90+6'; Yamal (yellow card) 42'; Roberto (yellow card) 54'; Guiu 90+1'	Stadium: Bosuilstadion; Attendance: 13,550; Referee: Marco Guida (Italy)

==== Knockout phase ====
===== Round of 16 =====
As a result of finishing top of the group, Barcelona were seeded for the round of 16 draw which took place on 18 December 2023, and would play the second leg at home. They were drawn against Italian side Napoli, who finished second in Group C.

21 February 2024 First leg	Napoli (Italy)	1–1	(Spain) Barcelona	Naples, Italy
21:00 CET (UTC+1)	Osimhen 75'	Report	De Jong (yellow card) 16'; Lewandowski 60'; Martínez (yellow card) 76'; Christensen (yellow card) 78'	Stadium: Stadio Diego Armando Maradona; Attendance: 49,529; Referee: Felix Zwayer (Germany)

12 March 2024 Second leg	Barcelona (Spain)	3–1 (4–2 agg.)	(Italy) Napoli	Barcelona, Spain
21:00 CET (UTC+1)	Fermín 15'; Cancelo 17'; Christensen (yellow card) 19'; Yamal (yellow card) 44'; Lewandowski 83'	Report	Rrahmani 30'; Juan Jesus (yellow card) 45+2'; Traorè (yellow card) 63'; Olivera (yellow card) 67'	Stadium: Estadi Olímpic Lluís Companys; Attendance: 50,301; Referee: Danny Makkelie (Netherlands)

===== Quarter-finals =====
The draw for the remaining knockout rounds of the competition was held on 15 March 2024 in Nyon. Barcelona were drawn to face Ligue 1 champions Paris Saint-Germain in the quarter-finals, with the second leg being played at home. Paris Saint-Germain finished second in Group F and progressed past Real Sociedad 4–1 on aggregate in the round of 16.

10 April 2024 First leg	Paris Saint-Germain (France)	2–3	(Spain) Barcelona	Paris, France
21:00 CEST (UTC+2)	Dembélé 48'; Vitinha 51', (yellow card) 65'; Beraldo (yellow card) 89'	Report	Roberto (yellow card) 34'; Raphinha 37', 62'; Christensen 77', (yellow card) 88'; Cubarsí (yellow card) 82'; Fermín (yellow card) 89'	Stadium: Parc des Princes; Attendance: 47,470; Referee: Anthony Taylor (England)

16 April 2024 Second leg	Barcelona (Spain)	1–4 (4–6 agg.)	(France) Paris Saint-Germain	Barcelona, Spain
21:00 CEST (UTC+2)	Raphinha 12', (yellow card) 90+7'; Araújo (red card) 29'; Martínez (yellow card) 40'; Lewandowski (yellow card) 50'; Gündoğan (yellow card) 64'; Fermín (yellow card) 90+8'	Report	Dembélé 40'; Mbappé (yellow card) 40', (goal) 61' (pen.), 89'; Fabián (yellow card) 45+1'; Vitinha 54'; Marquinhos (yellow card) 62'; Donnarumma (yellow card) 87'	Stadium: Estadi Olímpic Lluís Companys; Attendance: 50,309; Referee: István Kovács (Romania)

== Statistics ==
=== Overall ===
As of last matchday.

No.	Pos.	Nat.	Player	La Liga		Copa del Rey		Supercopa de España		Champions League		Total		Discipline		Notes
No.	Pos.	Nat.	Player	Apps	Goals	Apps	Goals	Apps	Goals	Apps	Goals	Apps	Goals	Yellow card	Red card	Notes
Goalkeepers
1	GK	(Germany)	Marc-André ter Stegen	28	0	0	0	0	0	8	0	36	0	3	0	
13	GK	(Spain)	Iñaki Peña	10	0	3	0	2	0	2	0	17	0	0	0	
Defenders
2	DF	(Portugal)	João Cancelo	29+3	2	0	0	0	0	9+1	2	42	4	8	0	
3	DF	(Spain)	Alejandro Balde	15+3	0	2	1	2	0	3+3	0	28	1	2	0	
4	DF	(Uruguay)	Ronald Araújo	21+4	1	2	0	2	0	8	0	37	1	10	2	
5	DF	(Spain)	Iñigo Martínez	13+7	0	0+1	0	0	0	3+1	0	25	0	7	0	
15	DF	(Denmark)	Andreas Christensen	27+3	2	3	0	2	0	5+2	1	42	3	8	0	
17	DF	(Spain)	Marcos Alonso	3+2	0	0	0	0	0	2+1	0	8	0	0	0	
23	DF	(France)	Jules Koundé	32+3	1	3	1	2	0	8	0	48	2	5	0	
33	DF	(Spain)	Pau Cubarsí	18+1	0	0+2	0	0	0	3	0	24	0	6	0	
39	DF	(Spain)	Héctor Fort	4+3	0	1+1	0	0	0	1	0	10	0	1	0	
Midfielders
6	MF	(Spain)	Gavi	10+2	1	0	0	0	0	3	1	15	2	8	1	
8	MF	(Spain)	Pedri	16+8	4	1+1	0	1+1	0	3+3	0	34	4	3	0	
16/32 (Note: Fermín wore number 32 in La Liga, Copa del Rey and Supercopa de España matches played from 13 August until 27 January. Number 32 was used in Champions League matches until 16 April.)	MF	(Spain)	Fermín López	14+17	8	2	1	0+1	0	3+5	2	42	11	4	0	
18	MF	(Spain)	Oriol Romeu	11+17	0	2	0	0	0	4+3	0	37	0	4	0	
20	MF	(Spain)	Sergi Roberto	10+4	3	1+2	0	2	0	2+3	0	24	3	9	0	
21	MF	(Netherlands)	Frenkie de Jong	20	2	3	0	2	0	5	0	30	2	10	0	
22	MF	(Germany)	İlkay Gündoğan	33+3	5	1+2	0	2	0	9+1	0	51	5	6	0	
30	MF	(Spain)	Marc Casadó	0+2	0	0	0	0	0	0+2	0	4	0	0	0	
Forwards
7	FW	(Spain)	Ferran Torres	12+17	7	3	1	2	0	3+5	3	42	11	4	0	
9	FW	(Poland)	Robert Lewandowski	32+3	19	1+2	2	2	2	9	3	49	26	6	0	
11	FW	(Brazil)	Raphinha	17+11	6	1	1	1	0	6+1	3	37	10	5	1	
14	FW	(Portugal)	João Félix	18+12	7	2+1	0	0+2	0	4+5	3	44	10	5	0	
19	FW	(Brazil)	Vitor Roque	2+12	2	0+2	0	0	0	0	0	16	2	4	1	
27	FW	(Spain)	Lamine Yamal	22+15	5	1	1	0+2	1	7+3	0	50	7	6	0	
38	FW	(Spain)	Marc Guiu	1+2	1	1+1	0	0	0	0+2	1	7	2	2	0	
Players who left during the season but made an appearance
10	FW	(Spain)	Ansu Fati	0+3	0	0	0	0	0	0	0	3	0	0	0	
16	FW	(Morocco)	Abde Ezzalzouli	0+2	0	0	0	0	0	0	0	2	0	0	0	
24	DF	(Spain)	Eric García	0+2	0	0	0	0	0	0	0	2	0	1	0	

=== Goalscorers ===
As of last matchday.

Rank	No.	Pos.	Nat.	Player	La Liga	Copa del Rey	Supercopa de España	Champions League	Total
1	9	FW	(Poland)	Robert Lewandowski	19	2	2	3	26
2	16/32	MF	(Spain)	Fermín López	8	1	—	2	11
2	7	FW	(Spain)	Ferran Torres	7	1	—	3	11
4	14	FW	(Portugal)	João Félix	7	—	—	3	10
4	11	FW	(Brazil)	Raphinha	6	1	—	3	10
6	27	FW	(Spain)	Lamine Yamal	5	1	1	—	7
7	22	MF	(Germany)	İlkay Gündoğan	5	—	—	—	5
8	8	MF	(Spain)	Pedri	4	—	—	—	4
8	2	DF	(Portugal)	João Cancelo	2	—	—	2	4
10	20	MF	(Spain)	Sergi Roberto	3	—	—	—	3
10	15	DF	(Denmark)	Andreas Christensen	2	—	—	1	3
12	19	FW	(Brazil)	Vitor Roque	2	—	—	—	2
12	21	MF	(Netherlands)	Frenkie de Jong	2	—	—	—	2
12	23	DF	(France)	Jules Koundé	1	1	—	—	2
12	6	MF	(Spain)	Gavi	1	—	—	1	2
12	38	FW	(Spain)	Marc Guiu	1	—	—	1	2
17	4	DF	(Uruguay)	Ronald Araújo	1	—	—	—	1
17	3	DF	(Spain)	Alejandro Balde	—	1	—	—	1
Own goals (from the opponents)					3	—	—	1	4
Totals					79	8	3	20	110

=== Hat-tricks ===
Player	Against	Minutes	Score after goals	Result	Date	Competition	Ref
(Spain) Ferran Torres	(Spain) Real Betis	21', 48', 90+2'	0–1, 0–2, 2–4	2–4 (A)	21 January 2024	La Liga	
(Poland) Robert Lewandowski	(Spain) Valencia	49', 82', 90+3'	2–2, 3–2, 4–2	4–2 (H)	29 April 2024	La Liga	

(H) – Home; (A) – Away

=== Assists ===
As of last matchday.

Rank	No.	Pos.	Nat.	Player	La Liga	Copa del Rey	Supercopa de España	Champions League	Total
1	22	MF	(Germany)	İlkay Gündoğan	9	—	1	4	14
2	11	FW	(Brazil)	Raphinha	9	—	—	2	11
3	9	FW	(Poland)	Robert Lewandowski	8	—	—	1	9
4	14	FW	(Portugal)	João Félix	4	1	1	1	7
4	27	FW	(Spain)	Lamine Yamal	5	—	—	2	7
6	2	DF	(Portugal)	João Cancelo	4	—	—	1	5
6	8	MF	(Spain)	Pedri	2	—	—	3	5
8	23	DF	(France)	Jules Koundé	2	2	—	—	4
9	39	DF	(Spain)	Héctor Fort	2	1	—	—	3
9	7	FW	(Spain)	Ferran Torres	2	—	—	1	3
9	20	MF	(Spain)	Sergi Roberto	2	—	—	1	3
12	15	DF	(Denmark)	Andreas Christensen	2	—	—	—	2
12	4	DF	(Uruguay)	Ronald Araújo	2	—	—	—	2
14	18	MF	(Spain)	Oriol Romeu	1	—	—	—	1
14	6	MF	(Spain)	Gavi	1	—	—	—	1
14	3	DF	(Spain)	Alejandro Balde	1	—	—	—	1
14	33	DF	(Spain)	Pau Cubarsí	—	1	—	—	1
14	16/32	MF	(Spain)	Fermín López	—	—	—	1	1
Totals					56	5	2	17	80

=== Clean sheets ===
As of last matchday.

Rank	No.	Nat.	Player	La Liga	Copa del Rey	Supercopa de España	Champions League	Total
1	1	(Germany)	Marc-André ter Stegen	15	—	—	2	17
2	13	(Spain)	Iñaki Peña	2	0	1	0	3
Totals				17	0	1	2	20

=== Disciplinary record ===
As of last matchday.

No.	Pos.	Nat.	Player	La Liga			Copa del Rey			Supercopa de España			Champions League			Total		
No.	Pos.	Nat.	Player	Yellow card	(yellow card) (yellow-red card)	Red card	Yellow card	(yellow card) (yellow-red card)	Red card	Yellow card	(yellow card) (yellow-red card)	Red card	Yellow card	(yellow card) (yellow-red card)	Red card	Yellow card	(yellow card) (yellow-red card)	Red card
4	DF	(Uruguay)	Ronald Araújo	6						2	1		2		1	10	1	1
11	FW	(Brazil)	Raphinha	4		1							1			5		1
6	MF	(Spain)	Gavi	6									2	1		8	1	
19	FW	(Brazil)	Vitor Roque	4	1											4	1	
21	MF	(Netherlands)	Frenkie de Jong	7			1						2			10		
20	MF	(Spain)	Sergi Roberto	4			1			1			3			9		
2	DF	(Portugal)	João Cancelo	7									1			8		
15	DF	(Denmark)	Andreas Christensen	4			1						3			8		
5	DF	(Spain)	Iñigo Martínez	5									2			7		
9	FW	(Poland)	Robert Lewandowski	5									1			6		
22	MF	(Germany)	İlkay Gündoğan	5									1			6		
33	DF	(Spain)	Pau Cubarsí	4			1						1			6		
27	FW	(Spain)	Lamine Yamal	3			1						2			6		
23	DF	(France)	Jules Koundé	4									1			5		
14	FW	(Portugal)	João Félix	3									2			5		
18	MF	(Spain)	Oriol Romeu	4												4		
16/32	MF	(Spain)	Fermín López	2									2			4		
7	FW	(Spain)	Ferran Torres	1			1						2			4		
8	MF	(Spain)	Pedri	3												3		
1	GK	(Germany)	Marc-André ter Stegen	3												3		
38	FW	(Spain)	Marc Guiu	1			1									2		
3	DF	(Spain)	Alejandro Balde	1									1			2		
24	DF	(Spain)	Eric García	1												1		
39	DF	(Spain)	Héctor Fort				1									1		
Coach		(Spain)	Xavi	7		2	1						1		1	9		3
Totals				94	1	3	9			3	1		30	1	2	136	3	5

Source: FCBarcelona.com
Ordered by (red card) , (second yellow card) and (yellow card)
(yellow card) = Number of bookings; (second yellow card) = Number of sending offs after a second yellow card; (red card) = Number of sending offs by a direct red card.

=== Injury record ===
No.	Pos.	Nat.	Name	Type	Status	Source	Match	Inj. Date	Ret. Date
4	DF	(Uruguay)	Ronald Araújo	Biceps femoris tendon rupture — left leg		FCB.com	in training	17 August 2023	22 September 2023
8	MF	(Spain)	Pedri	Quadriceps injury — right leg		FCB.com	in training	24 August 2023	3 November 2023
21	MF	(Netherlands)	Frenkie de Jong	Tibiofibular syndesmosis injury — right ankle		FCB.com	vs Celta Vigo	23 September 2023	24 November 2023
11	FW	(Brazil)	Raphinha	Hamstring injury — right thigh		FCB.com	vs Sevilla	29 September 2023	28 October 2023
9	FW	(Poland)	Robert Lewandowski	Sprained ankle — left ankle		FCB.com	vs Porto	4 October 2023	28 October 2023
23	DF	(France)	Jules Koundé	Lateral collateral ligament injury — right knee		FCB.com	vs Granada	8 October 2023	28 October 2023
27	FW	(Spain)	Lamine Yamal	Iliopsoas muscle injury — left leg		FCB.com	vs Granada	8 October 2023	22 October 2023
3	DF	(Spain)	Alejandro Balde	Adductor brevis muscle injury		FCB.com	vs Scotland with Spain	12 October 2023	22 October 2023
20	MF	(Spain)	Sergi Roberto	Soleus muscle injury — right leg		FCB.com	in training	18 October 2023	28 November 2023
1	GK	(Germany)	Marc-André ter Stegen	Lower back injury — surgery		FCB.com	with Germany	17 November 2023	11 February 2024
6	MF	(Spain)	Gavi	Anterior cruciate ligament tear — right knee		FCB.com	vs Georgia with Spain	19 November 2023	
17	DF	(Spain)	Marcos Alonso	Lower back injury		FCB.com	in training	1 December 2023	17 March 2024
5	DF	(Spain)	Iñigo Martínez	Biceps femoris muscle injury — right hamstring		FCB.com	in warm-up	3 December 2023	2 February 2024
8	MF	(Spain)	Pedri	Muscle injury		FCB.com	in training	19 December 2023	11 January 2024
2	DF	(Portugal)	João Cancelo	Strained medial collateral ligament — left knee		FCB.com	vs Las Palmas	4 January 2024	23 January 2024
11	FW	(Brazil)	Raphinha	Biceps femoris muscle injury — left thigh		FCB.com	vs Osasuna	11 January 2024	11 February 2024
3	DF	(Spain)	Alejandro Balde	Biceps femoris muscle injury — right hamstring		FCB.com	vs Athletic Bilbao	24 January 2024	25 July 2024
7	FW	(Spain)	Ferran Torres	Biceps femoris muscle injury — right hamstring		FCB.com	vs Osasuna	31 January 2024	30 March 2024
21	MF	(Netherlands)	Frenkie de Jong	Lateral ligament ankle sprain — right ankle		FCB.com	vs Athletic Bilbao	3 March 2024	10 April 2024
8	MF	(Spain)	Pedri	Rectus femoris muscle injury — right thigh		FCB.com	vs Athletic Bilbao	3 March 2024	10 April 2024
21	MF	(Netherlands)	Frenkie de Jong	Ankle spain — right ankle		FCB.com	vs Real Madrid	21 April 2024	

- Player is injured
- Player has recovered from injury
Source: FC Barcelona

== Milestones ==
=== Debuts ===
The following players made their competitive debuts for the first team during the campaign.

Legend

– Indicates youth academy debut.

Date	No.	Pos.	Nat.	Name	Age	Final score	Opponent	Competition	Source
13 August 2023	22	MF	(Germany)	İlkay Gündoğan	32	0–0 (A)	Getafe	La Liga	
27 August 2023	32	MF	(Spain)	Fermín López	20	3–4 (A)	Villarreal	La Liga	
3 September 2023	2	DF	(Portugal)	João Cancelo	29	1–2 (A)	Osasuna	La Liga	
3 September 2023	14	FW	(Portugal)	João Félix	23	1–2 (A)	Osasuna	La Liga	
3 September 2023	5	DF	(Spain)	Iñigo Martínez	32	1–2 (A)	Osasuna	La Liga	
22 October 2023	38	FW	(Spain)	Marc Guiu (Note: In this debut, Guiu scored his first goal with the first team.)	17	1–0 (H)	Athletic Bilbao	La Liga	
13 December 2023	39	DF	(Spain)	Héctor Fort	17	3–2 (A)	(Belgium) Antwerp	Champions League	
4 January 2024	19	FW	(Brazil)	Vitor Roque	18	1–2 (A)	Las Palmas	La Liga	
18 January 2024	33	DF	(Spain)	Pau Cubarsí	16	1–3 (A)	Unionistas	Copa del Rey	

(H) – Home; (A) – Away

=== Appearances ===
The following players made their 100th, 150th, 200th, 350th or 400th appearances for Barcelona's first team during the campaign.

Date	No.	Pos.	Nat.	Name	Age	Final score	Opponent	Competition	Source
100th appearances
3 September 2023	6	MF	(Spain)	Gavi	19	1–2 (A)	Osasuna	La Liga	
21 January 2024	7	FW	(Spain)	Ferran Torres	23	2–4 (A)	Betis	La Liga	
150th appearances
19 May 2024	4	DF	(Uruguay)	Ronald Araújo	25	3–0 (H)	Rayo Vallecano	La Liga	
200th appearance
18 January 2024	21	MF	(Netherlands)	Frenkie de Jong	26	1–3 (A)	Unionistas	Copa del Rey	
350th appearance
20 August 2023	20	MF	(Spain)	Sergi Roberto	31	2–0 (H)	Cádiz	La Liga	
400th appearance
8 March 2024	1	GK	(Germany)	Marc-André ter Stegen	31	1–0 (H)	Mallorca	La Liga	

(H) – Home; (A) – Away

=== First goals ===
The following players scored their first goals for Barcelona's first team during the campaign.

Date	No.	Pos.	Nat.	Name	Age	Score	Final score	Opponent	Competition	Source
16 September 2023	14	FW	(Portugal)	João Félix	23	1–0 (H)	5–0 (H)	Betis	La Liga	
16 September 2023	2	DF	(Portugal)	João Cancelo	29	5–0 (H)	5–0 (H)	Betis	La Liga	
26 September 2023	32	MF	(Spain)	Fermín López	20	2–2 (A)	2–2 (A)	Mallorca	La Liga	
8 October 2023	27	FW	(Spain)	Lamine Yamal	16	2–1 (Note: Yamal became the youngest goalscorer of all time in La Liga thanks to this goal.) (A)	2–2 (A)	Granada	La Liga	
22 October 2023	38	FW	(Spain)	Marc Guiu	17	1–0 (Note: This goal coincided with the debut day.) (H)	1–0 (H)	Athletic Bilbao	La Liga	
28 October 2023	22	MF	(Germany)	İlkay Gündoğan	33	1–0 (H)	1–2 (H)	Real Madrid	La Liga	
31 January 2024	19	FW	(Brazil)	Vitor Roque	18	1–0 (H)	1–0 (H)	Osasuna	La Liga	

(H) – Home; (A) – Away

=== Goals ===
The following players made their 50th or 100th competitive goals for Barcelona's first team during the campaign.

Date	No.	Pos.	Nat.	Name	Age	Apps to milestone	Score	Final score	Opponent	Competition	Source
50th goal
17 February 2024	9	FW	(Poland)	Robert Lewandowski	35	79	1–2 (A)	1–2 (A)	Celta Vigo	La Liga	

(H) – Home; (A) – Away

=== First starts as captain ===
The following players made their first starts as captain of Barcelona's first team during the campaign.

Date	No.	Pos.	Nat.	Name	Age	Final score	Opponent	Competition	Source
28 November 2023	4	DF	(Uruguay)	Ronald Araújo	24	2–1 (H)	(Portugal) Porto	Champions League	

(H) – Home; (A) – Away

== Awards ==
Player	Position	Award	Ref.
(Germany) Marc-André ter Stegen	Goalkeeper	Premi Barça Jugadors 2022–23 (2nd award – shared record)	
(Spain) Lamine Yamal	Forward	La Liga U23 Player of the Month (August 2023) (1st award)	
(Portugal) João Cancelo	Defender	La Liga Goal of the Month (vs Real Betis) (September 2023) (1st award)	
(Spain) Lamine Yamal	Forward	The Youngest (2023) (1st award – record)	
(Spain) Alejandro Balde	Defender	IFFHS Men's Youth (U20) World Team (2023) (1st appearance)	
(Spain) Gavi	Midfielder	IFFHS Men's Youth (U20) World Team (2023) (2nd appearance)	
(Denmark) Andreas Christensen	Defender	Danish Football Player of the Year (2023) (1st award)	
(Spain) Ferran Torres (Portugal) João Félix	Forward	La Liga Play of the Month (January 2024) (1st award)	
(Germany) Marc-André ter Stegen	Goalkeeper	Memorial Aldo Rovira Award 2022–23 (2nd award)	
(Poland) Robert Lewandowski	Forward	La Liga Player of the Month (February 2024) (2nd award)	
(Spain) Lamine Yamal	Forward	GOAL NXGN 2024 – The Best Wonderkid of the Year (2023) (1st award – shared record)	
(Spain) Pau Cubarsí	Defender	La Liga U23 Player of the Month (March 2024) (1st award)	
(Spain) Lamine Yamal	Forward	La Liga Goal of the Month (vs Mallorca) (March 2024) (1st award)	
(Brazil) Raphinha	Forward	UEFA Champions League Player of the Week – Quarter-finals – 1st leg (vs Paris Saint-Germain)	
(Portugal) João Félix	Forward	La Liga Goal of the Month (vs Cádiz) (April 2024) (1st award)	
(Germany) İlkay Gündoğan	Midfielder	La Liga Team of the Season (2023–24) (1st appearance)	
(Poland) Robert Lewandowski	Forward	La Liga Team of the Season (2023–24) (2nd appearance)	
(Uruguay) Ronald Araújo	Defender	La Liga Team of the Season (2023–24) (2nd appearance)	
(Spain) Lamine Yamal	Forward	La Liga U23 Player of the Season (2023–24) (1st award – record)	
(Spain) Lamine Yamal	Forward	Globe Soccer Awards – Europe Edition: Emerging Player (2024) (1st award – shared record)	
