= Jules Koundé =

French footballer (born 1998)

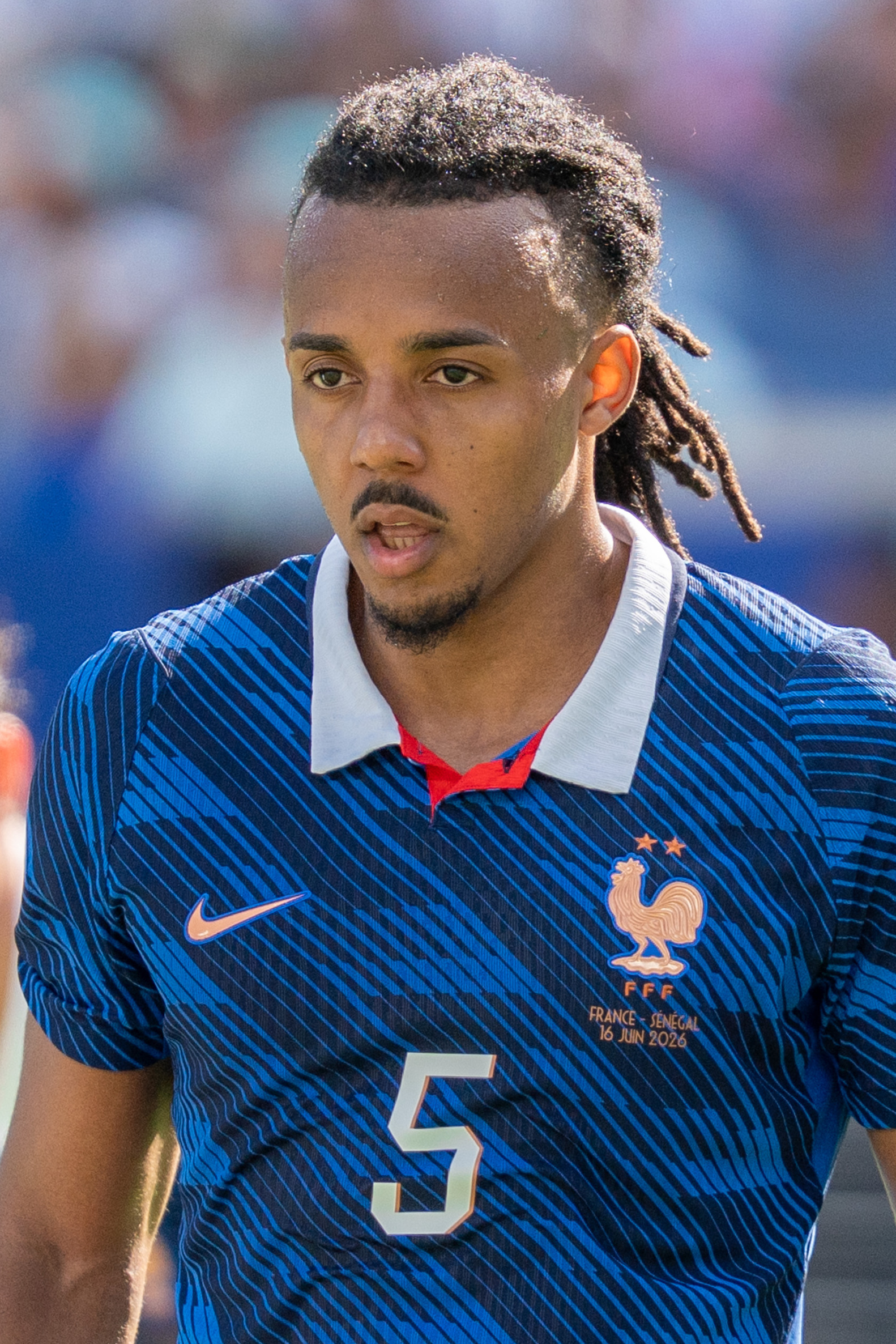
- Koundé with France in 2026

Personal information
- Full name: Jules Olivier Koundé
- Date of birth: 12 November 1998 (age 28)
- Place of birth: Paris, France
- Height: 1.81 m (5 ft 11 in)
- Position: Defender

Team information
- Current team: Barcelona
- Number: 23

Youth career
- 2004–2009: Fraternelle Landiras
- 2009–2010: Cérons
- 2010–2013: La Brède
- 2013–2018: Bordeaux

Senior career*
Years	Team	Apps	(Gls)
2016–2017	Bordeaux II	29	(1)
2017–2019	Bordeaux	55	(2)
2019–2022	Sevilla	95	(5)
2022–	Barcelona	133	(6)

International career^{‡}
2018	France U20	1	(0)
2020–2021	France U21	8	(1)
2021–	France	58	(0)
Medal record
Men's football
Representing France
FIFA World Cup
Runner-up	2022 Qatar
UEFA Nations League
Winner	2021 Italy
- * Club domestic league appearances and goals as of 21:15, 22 November 2026 (UTC) ‡ National team caps and goals as of 15:30, 6 October 2026 (UTC)

Jules Olivier Koundé (French pronunciation: [ʒyl ɔlivje kunde]; born 12 November 1998) is a French professional footballer who plays as a defender for La Liga club Barcelona and the France national team. Primarily a right-back, he is also capable of playing as a centre-back.

== Early life ==
Jules Olivier Koundé was born on 12 November 1998 in Paris and grew up in Landiras, Gironde. Koundé holds citizenship of both Benin and France.

He began playing football at the age of six, in December 2004, with the Fraternelle de Landiras club. He became patron of the football school in 2018. He then joined Olympique de Cérons for the 2009–10 season.

Koundé grew up with his mother. He has stated that during his youth, he struggled with his temper after poor performances from his local team, expressing "I'd be in a foul mood all weekend: atrocious behaviour. I got into such a rage that I ended up kicking my poor mum."

== Club career ==
=== Bordeaux ===
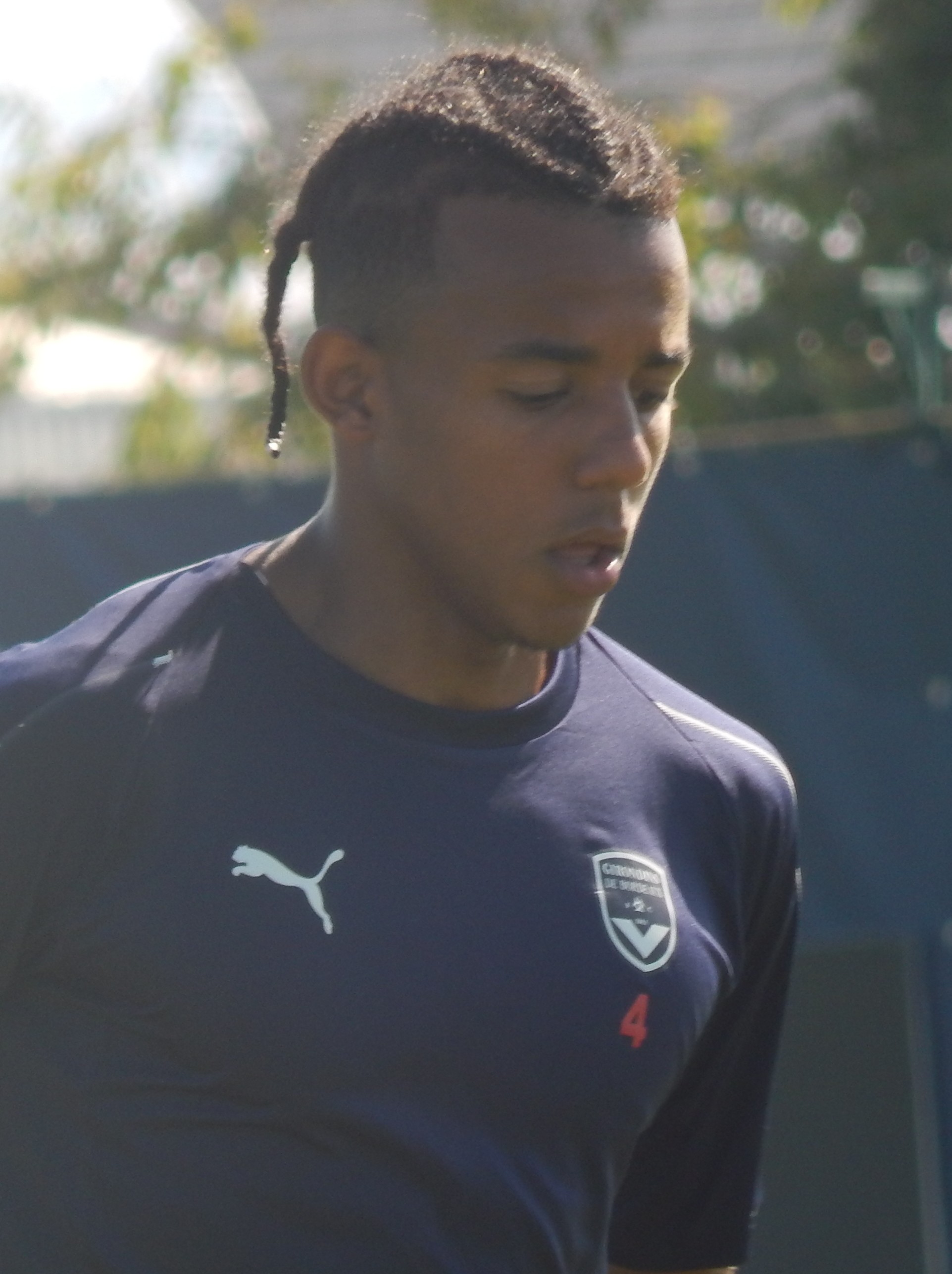
Koundé with Bordeaux in 2018

Koundé started in his first team debut for Bordeaux in the 2–1 Coupe de France away loss to Granville in the round of 64 on 7 January 2018, playing the full 90 minutes of normal time and the full 30 minutes of extra time. He made his Ligue 1 debut for Bordeaux in a 1–0 away win over Troyes on 13 January 2018. On 10 February 2018, Koundé scored the opening goal of a 3–2 Ligue 1 home win over Amiens; it was his first career Ligue 1 goal and his first competitive goal for Bordeaux's first team.

=== Sevilla ===
On 3 July 2019, he signed for Spanish club Sevilla. The transfer fee paid to Bordeaux was reported as €25 million. In his first season at Sevilla, he helped the club win the 2019–20 UEFA Europa League for a record sixth time and was named in the competition's team of the season.

=== Barcelona ===
On 29 July 2022, Barcelona announced an agreement with Sevilla for the transfer of Koundé. Koundé missed Barcelona's first match of the La Liga season against Rayo Vallecano as the club could not register him as they were over the league's salary cap limit. He also missed Barcelona's second league match against Real Sociedad on 21 August for the same reason. Koundé was registered with La Liga on 26 August, and made his official debut for the club two days later in a 4–0 home win over Real Valladolid.

On 16 January 2023, Barcelona won the 2023 Supercopa de España, following a 3–1 victory over El Clásico rivals Real Madrid in the final, as Koundé won his first silverware with the club. On 14 May 2023, he scored his first goal for Barça in a 4–2 win against Espanyol away at RCDE Stadium, a victory that secured Barcelona as La Liga champions. Towards the end of his debut season, reports from Spain stated that Koundé wanted a transfer away from Barcelona, due to manager Xavi playing him at right-back instead of his preferred centre-back position.

On 3 December 2023, Koundé scored only his second Barcelona goal in a 2–1 win against Osasuna away at El Sadar Stadium. On 11 December, he made an assist to Robert Lewandowski in a 2–1 win against Deportivo Alavés at home. Midway through the season, Barça manager Xavi had shifted Koundé from a centre-back, back to right-back. Although initially opposed to Xavi's idea, Koundé decided to adapt the position. He assisted a goal for Raphinha in a 4–0 win against Getafe on 24 February 2024.

On 12 January 2025, Barcelona played against Real Madrid in the 2025 Supercopa de España final, in which Koundé provided an assist for Raphinha to make the score 3–1, with his side ultimately winning 5–2 to claim the title. A few months later, on 26 April, he scored the winning goal in the Copa del Rey final during extra time, securing a 3–2 victory over Real Madrid.

On 9 December 2025, Koundé scored twice in a 2–1 home win over Eintracht Frankfurt in the UEFA Champions League, which was Barcelona's first Champions League game at Camp Nou in over three years following a period of renovations.

== International career ==
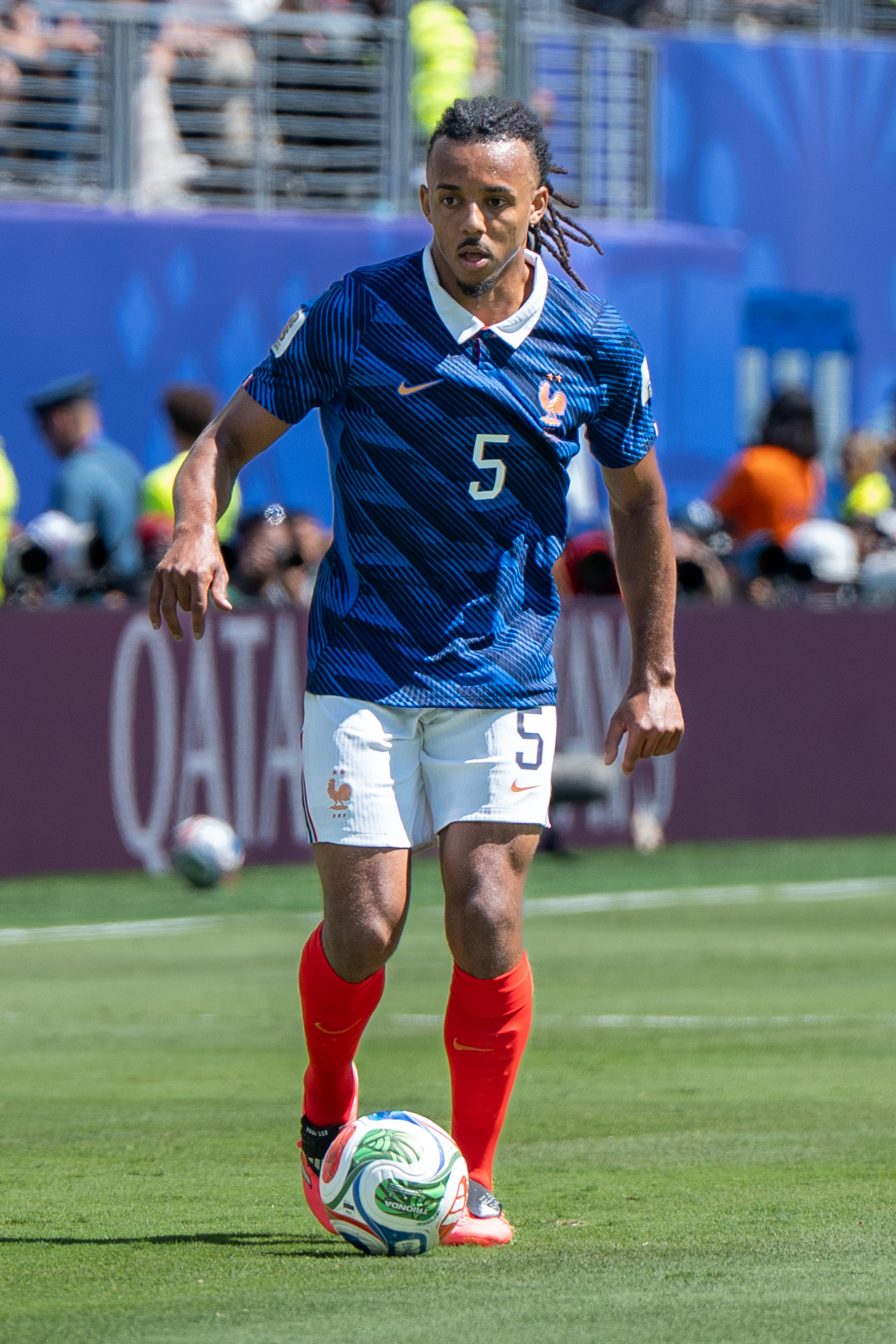
Koundé at the 2026 FIFA World Cup

Koundé was a member of France's squad for the group stage of the 2021 UEFA European Under-21 Championship, starting in central defence in all three matches and captaining the team in the 2–0 win against Russia.

On 18 May 2021, Koundé was selected by Didier Deschamps as part of the 26 players that formed the France national team for UEFA Euro 2020. He made his debut on 2 June 2021 in a pre-tournament friendly against Wales, coming on as a substitute for Benjamin Pavard at half-time. He made one appearance at Euro 2020, playing the full match against Portugal in Group F.

On 10 October 2021, Koundé started and played the whole match as France defeated Spain 2–1 in the 2021 UEFA Nations League final.

Koundé was a member of France's squad for the 2022 FIFA World Cup where he started five of the team's seven matches at right back as they finished as runners-up to Argentina.

In May 2024, Koundé was named in France's squad for UEFA Euro 2024. At the tournament, he started all six matches for France at right-back, and was named man of the match in their 1–0 victory over Belgium in the round of 16.

On 14 May 2026, Koundé was selected in the 26-man squad for the 2026 FIFA World Cup.

== Style of play ==
Originally a centre-back in his Bordeaux days, Koundé was shifted to a right-back during his time at Barcelona. He has shown quickness, as well as attacking and defensive work rates. Performing well at right-back for both club and country under Xavi and Deschamps respectively, he developed a strong partnership on the right flank with Lamine Yamal at Barça, under the orders of Hansi Flick.

== Personal life ==
Koundé has French and Beninese nationality. His mother is French and his father is from Benin. His uncle Charles Tokplé is a former footballer who played for the Togo national team.

Koundé has attracted media attention for his outfits, which have included brightly coloured clothing, skirts, and designer ensembles.

== Career statistics ==
=== Club ===
As of match played 22 November 2026

Appearances and goals by club, season and competition
Club	Season	League			National cup (Note: Includes Coupe de France, Copa del Rey)		League cup (Note: Includes Coupe de la Ligue)		Europe		Other		Total	
Club	Season	Division	Apps	Goals	Apps	Goals	Apps	Goals	Apps	Goals	Apps	Goals	Apps	Goals
Bordeaux II	2015–16	CFA	8	0	—		—		—		—		8	0
Bordeaux II	2016–17	CFA 2	15	1	—		—		—		—		15	1
Bordeaux II	2017–18	CFA 2	6	0	—		—		—		—		6	0
Bordeaux II	Total		29	1	—		—		—		—		29	1
Bordeaux	2017–18	Ligue 1	18	2	1	0	0	0	0	0	—		19	2
Bordeaux	2018–19	Ligue 1	37	0	1	0	3	0	10 (Note: Appearances in UEFA Europa League)	2	—		51	2
Bordeaux	Total		55	2	2	0	3	0	10	2	—		70	4
Sevilla	2019–20	La Liga	29	1	2	1	—		9	0	—		40	2
Sevilla	2020–21	La Liga	34	2	7	1	—		7 (Note: Appearances in UEFA Champions League)	1	1 (Note: Appearance in UEFA Super Cup)	0	49	4
Sevilla	2021–22	La Liga	32	2	3	1	—		9 (Note: Five appearances in UEFA Champions League, four appearances in UEFA Europa League)	0	—		44	3
Sevilla	Total		95	5	12	3	—		25	1	1	0	133	9
Barcelona	2022–23	La Liga	29	1	4	0	—		5 (Note: Three appearances in UEFA Champions League, two appearances in UEFA Europa League)	0	2 (Note: Appearances in Supercopa de España)	0	40	1
Barcelona	2023–24	La Liga	35	1	3	1	—		8	0	2	0	48	2
Barcelona	2024–25	La Liga	32	2	6	2	—		13	0	2	0	53	4
Barcelona	2025–26	La Liga	30	1	5	0	—		10	2	2	0	47	3
Barcelona	2026–27	La Liga	7	1	0	0	—		2	0	0	0	9	1
Barcelona	Total		133	6	18	3	—		38	2	8	0	197	11
Career total			313	14	32	6	3	0	73	5	9	0	429	25

=== International ===
As of match played 5 October 2026

Appearances and goals by national team and year
National team	Year	Apps	Goals
France	2021	7	0
France	2022	11	0
France	2023	6	0
France	2024	16	0
France	2025	6	0
France	2026	12	0
Total		58	0

== Honours ==
Sevilla

- UEFA Europa League: 2019–20

Barcelona

- La Liga: 2022–23, 2024–25, 2025–26
- Supercopa de España: 2023, 2025, 2026
- Copa del Rey: 2024–25

France

- UEFA Nations League: 2020–21
- FIFA World Cup runner-up: 2022

Individual

- UEFA Europa League Squad of the Season: 2019–20
- La Liga Team of the Season: 2021–22, 2022–23, 2024–25
