= Alejandro Balde =

Spanish footballer (born 2003)

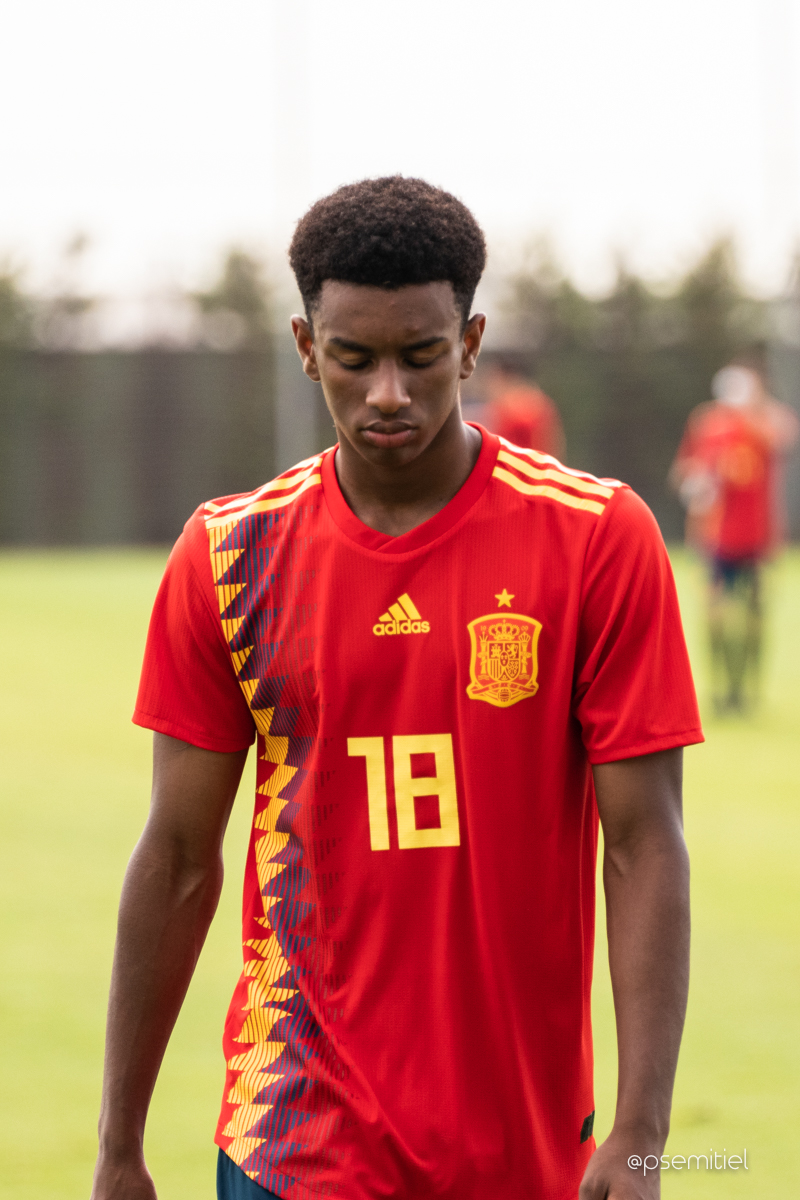
- Balde playing for Spain U17 in 2019

Personal information
- Full name: Alejandro Balde Martínez
- Date of birth: 18 October 2003 (age 23)
- Place of birth: Barcelona, Spain
- Height: 1.77 m (5 ft 10 in)
- Position: Left-back

Team information
- Current team: Barcelona
- Number: 3

Youth career
- 2007–2009: Sant Gabriel
- 2009–2011: Espanyol
- 2011–2021: Barcelona

Senior career*
Years	Team	Apps	(Gls)
2020–2022	Barcelona B	29	(0)
2021–	Barcelona	119	(1)

International career^{‡}
2019	Spain U16	6	(0)
2019–2020	Spain U17	9	(0)
2019	Spain U18	3	(0)
2021	Spain U19	5	(0)
2022	Spain U21	2	(0)
2022–	Spain	7	(0)
- * Club domestic league appearances and goals as of 02:45, 17 September 2026 (UTC) ‡ National team caps and goals as of 12 October 2023

Alejandro Balde Martínez (born 18 October 2003) is a Spanish professional footballer who plays as a left-back for La Liga club Barcelona.

== Club career ==
Born in Barcelona, Catalonia, to a Dominican mother and Bissau-Guinean father, Balde joined Barcelona in 2011 at the age of eight after coming up through ranks at Espanyol. In July 2021, he signed a contract renewal with Barcelona until 2024 with a release clause of 500 million euros.

Balde impressed during pre-season in the summer 2021, and began the new campaign as Jordi Alba's primary back-up at the Camp Nou. He sat on the bench for the opening match against Real Sociedad and the next game against Athletic Bilbao. On 14 September, he played his first official match for Barcelona's first team replacing Alba in the 74th minute of a 3–0 loss to Bayern Munich in the group stage of the UEFA Champions League.

From the start of the 2022–23 season, Balde was given a more prominent role by coach Xavi, starting in more league matches than Jordi Alba and receiving more minutes in important matches. On 14 May, he scored his first goal for the club in a 4–2 away win over Espanyol, where his team secured the league title.

On 20 September, it was announced that Balde would sign a new contract at the club until 2028, with the buyout clause set at €1 billion. On 24 January 2024, he suffered a hamstring injury in his right leg, having to undergo surgery after leaving the pitch in tears against Athletic Bilbao in the Copa del Rey quarterfinals, which Barcelona lost 4–2, and ending up missing the rest of the season.

On 12 January 2025, Balde scored his first El Clásico goal in the 2025 Supercopa de España final, scoring Barcelona's fourth goal in an eventual 5–2 victory.

== International career ==
Balde is of Dominican descent through his mother and was eligible to play for Dominican Republic or Spain, but pledged allegiance to La Roja. He received a surprise call-up to the Spain national team two days before the start of the 2022 FIFA World Cup, as Valencia left-back José Gayà had injured his ankle in the training camp. On 23 November 2022, he made his first international appearance in a 7–0 win against Costa Rica, substituting for Jordi Alba in the 64th minute.

== Style of play ==
Balde is known for his pace, dribbling, and attacking contributions. He frequently pushes forward on the attack, overlapping the left flank to allow Barcelona's left-wingers to drift inside. His speed is also a great asset for him when he carries the ball through opposition lines.

== Career statistics ==
=== Club ===
As of match played 31 October 2026

Appearances and goals by club, season and competition
Club	Season	League			Copa del Rey		Europe		Other		Total	
Club	Season	Division	Apps	Goals	Apps	Goals	Apps	Goals	Apps	Goals	Apps	Goals
Barcelona B	2020–21	Segunda División B	15	0	—		—		1 (Note: Appearance in Segunda División B play-offs)	0	16	0
Barcelona B	2021–22	Primera División RFEF	14	0	—		—		0	0	14	0
Barcelona B	Total		29	0	0	0	0	0	1	0	30	0
Barcelona	2021–22	La Liga	5	0	0	0	2 (Note: Appearances in UEFA Champions League)	0	0	0	7	0
Barcelona	2022–23	La Liga	33	1	4	0	6 (Note: Four appearances in UEFA Champions League, two appearances in UEFA Europa League)	0	1 (Note: Appearance(s) in Supercopa de España)	0	44	1
Barcelona	2023–24	La Liga	18	0	2	1	6	0	2	0	28	1
Barcelona	2024–25	La Liga	32	0	3	0	10	0	2	1	47	1
Barcelona	2025–26	La Liga	28	0	4	0	8	0	2	0	42	0
Barcelona	2026–27	La Liga	3	0	0	0	1	0	0	0	4	0
Barcelona	Total		119	1	13	1	33	0	7	1	172	3
Career total			148	1	13	1	33	0	8	1	202	3

=== International ===
As of match played 12 October 2023

Appearances and goals by national team and year
National team	Year	Apps	Goals
Spain	2022	4	0
Spain	2023	3	0
Total		7	0

== Honours ==
Barcelona

- La Liga: 2022–23, 2024–25, 2025–26
- Copa del Rey: 2024–25
- Supercopa de España: 2023, 2025, 2026

Individual

- La Liga Team of the Season: 2022–23
- IFFHS Men's World Youth (U20) Team: 2023
- IFFHS Men's Youth (U20) UEFA Team: 2023
