= Vitor Roque =

Brazilian footballer (born 2005)

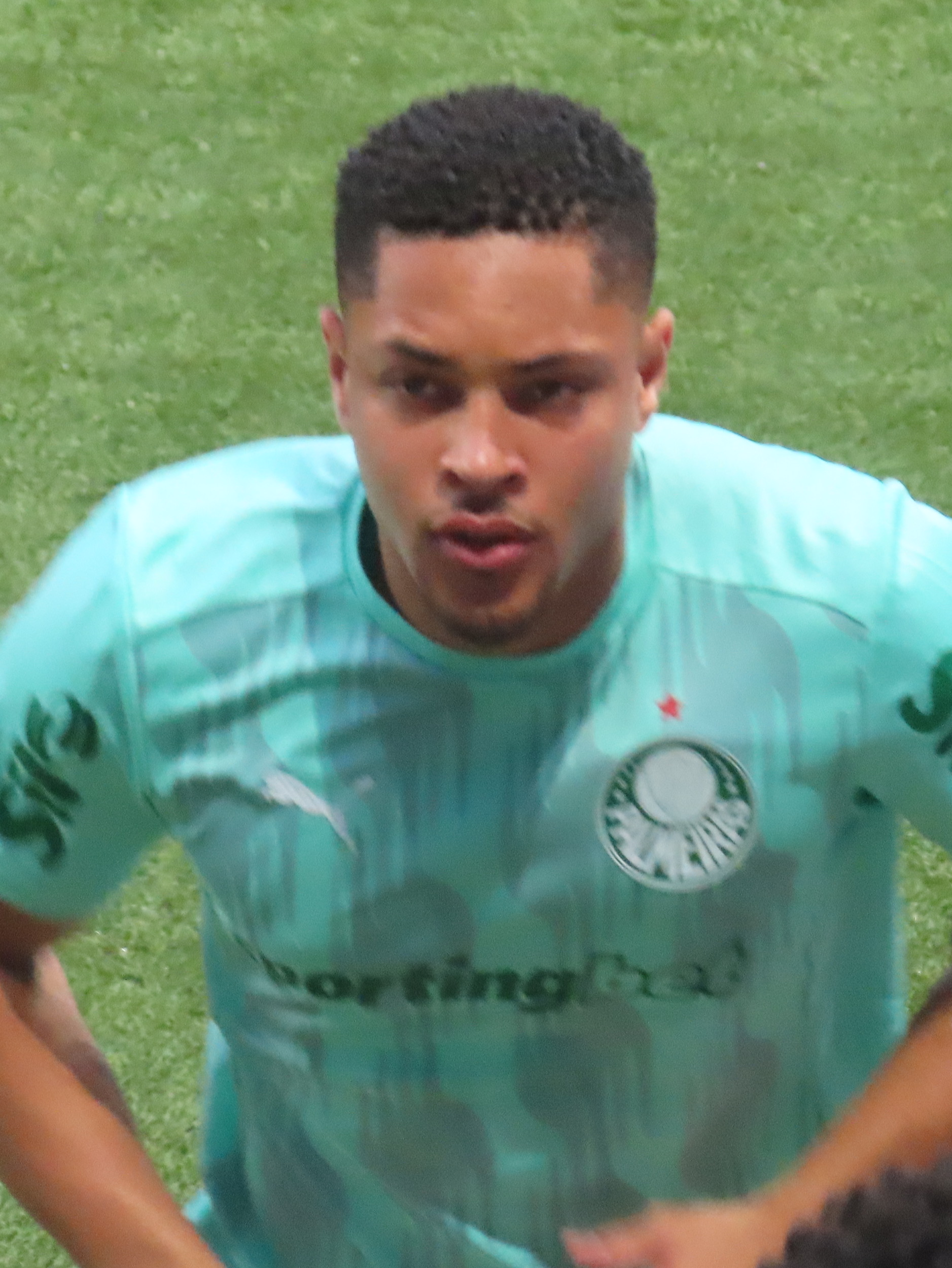
- Vitor Roque with Palmeiras in 2025

Personal information
- Full name: Vitor Hugo Roque Ferreira
- Date of birth: 28 February 2005 (age 21)
- Place of birth: Timóteo, Minas Gerais, Brazil
- Height: 1.72 m (5 ft 8 in)
- Position: Forward

Team information
- Current team: Palmeiras
- Number: 9

Youth career
- 2015–2019: América Mineiro
- 2019–2021: Cruzeiro

Senior career*
| Years | Team | Apps | (Gls) |
| 2021–2022 | Cruzeiro | 14 | (3) |
| 2022–2023 | Athletico Paranaense | 60 | (21) |
| 2023–2025 | Barcelona | 14 | (2) |
| 2024–2025 | → Betis (loan) | 22 | (4) |
| 2025– | Palmeiras | 66 | (24) |

International career^{‡}
| 2022–2023 | Brazil U20 | 12 | (8) |
| 2023– | Brazil U23 | 1 | (0) |
| 2023– | Brazil | 2 | (0) |
Medal record
Men's football
Representing Brazil
South American U-20 Championship
| Winner | 2023 Colombia |
- * Club domestic league appearances and goals as of 23:10, 5 November 2026 (UTC) ‡ National team caps and goals as of 23:15, 18 November 2025 (UTC)

Vitor Hugo Roque Ferreira (born 28 February 2005), commonly known as Vitor Roque (Brazilian Portuguese: [ˈvitoʁ ˈʁɔki]), is a Brazilian professional footballer who plays as a forward for Campeonato Brasileiro Série A club Palmeiras and the Brazil national team.

== Club career ==
=== Early career ===
Born in Timóteo, Minas Gerais, Vitor Roque joined América Mineiro's youth setup at the age of ten, and impressed with the side's youth categories in 2018. In March 2019, he signed a youth contract with Cruzeiro, which led América to sue his new club in the State Labour Department; both clubs only reached an agreement in May, with Cruzeiro retaining 65 per cent of the player's economic rights, and América keeping the other 35 per cent.

=== Cruzeiro ===
On 25 May 2021, Vitor Roque signed his first professional contract with Cruzeiro. He made his professional debut on 12 October; after coming on as a second-half substitute for Bruno José in a 0–0 Série B home draw against Botafogo, he played for 18 minutes before being himself replaced by Keké, with manager Vanderlei Luxemburgo saying that he was "unable to keep the pace" but also "praising for his debut".

Already a part of the first team for the 2022 season, Vitor Roque scored his first goal on 20 February of that year, netting the club's first in a 2–2 Campeonato Mineiro home draw against Villa Nova. Three days later, he scored a brace in a 5–0 away routing over Sergipe in the Copa do Brasil.

=== Athletico Paranaense ===
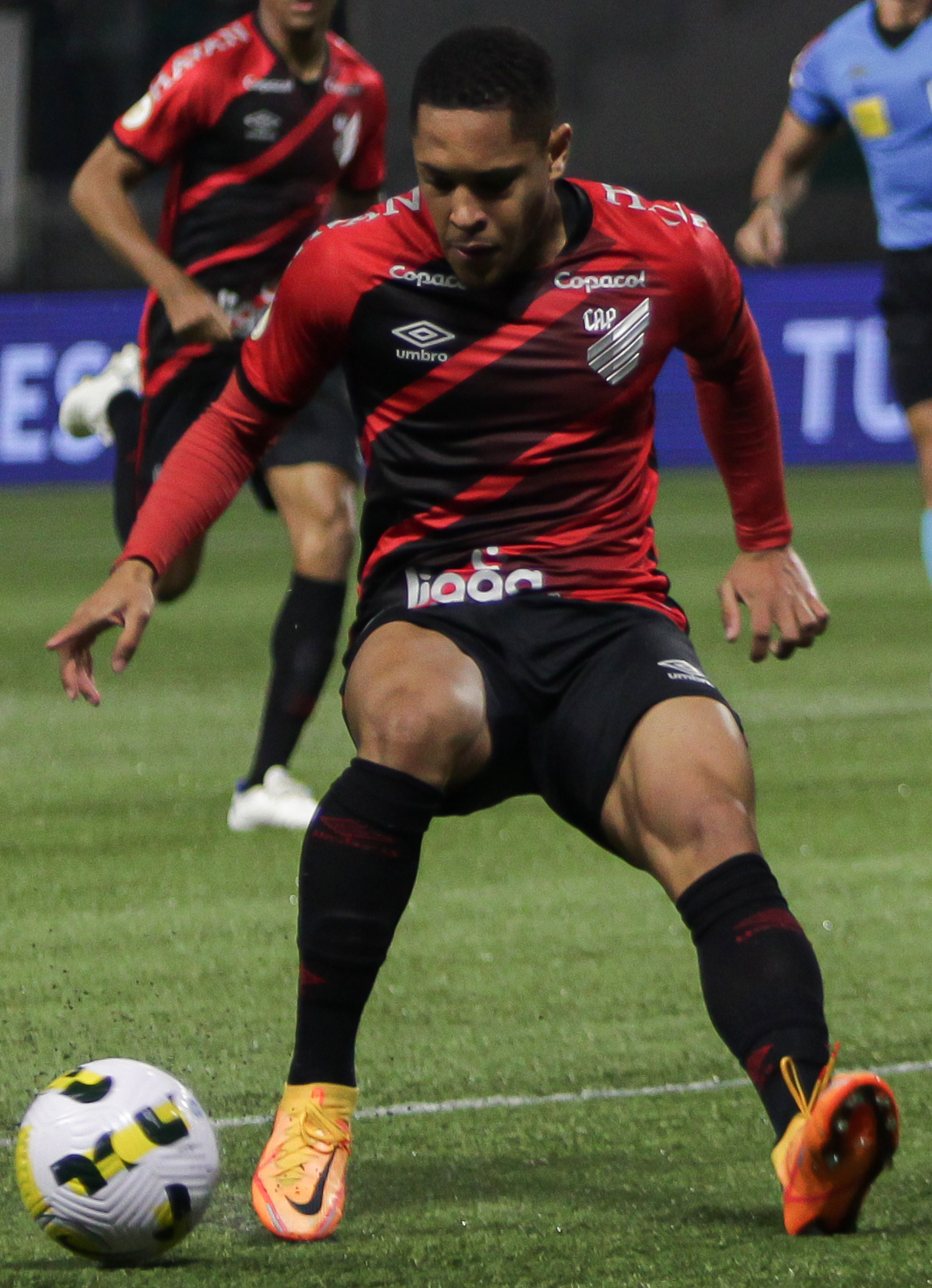
Vitor Roque with Athletico Paranaense in 2022

On 13 April 2022, Vitor Roque signed a five-year contract with Athletico Paranaense, after the club activated his R$ 24 million release clause; it was the biggest transfer of the club's history. He made his debut for the club four days later, replacing Luis Manuel Orejuela late into a 1–0 Série A home loss against Atlético Mineiro.

Vitor Roque scored his first goal for Furacão on 29 May 2022, scoring the winner in a 1–0 away win over Cuiabá. On 7 August, he scored a brace in a 3–2 away win over Atlético Mineiro, and finished the season with 13 goals, six for Cruzeiro and seven for Athletico.

On 2 December 2023, Athletico announced that their home game against Santos would be Roque's final appearance for the club, officially confirming his arrival to Spanish La Liga club Barcelona in January.

=== Barcelona ===
On 12 July 2023, La Liga club Barcelona announced that they had reached an agreement for the transfer of Roque with Athletico, agreeing a contract until 2030–31 season with a buyout clause of €500 million. On 27 December, Roque underwent medical examinations at Ciutat Esportiva, completed digital media obligations including his first club interview. He was assigned No.19 jersey.

On 4 January 2024, Roque made his La Liga debut for Barcelona, coming on as a substitute in the 78th minute of a 2–1 comeback victory away against Las Palmas. On 31 January, Roque scored his first goal for Barcelona, a header in a 1–0 league win against Osasuna.

==== Loan to Betis ====
On 26 August 2024, Roque joined Real Betis on a season-long loan. On 13 September, he scored his first goal for Betis in a league match against Leganés. On 15 January 2025, he scored against parent club Barcelona in a 5–1 defeat in the last 16 of the Copa del Rey. On 28 February, Real Betis and Barcelona agreed to terminate Roque's loan.

=== Palmeiras ===
On 28 February 2025, Palmeiras completed the signing of Roque for an initial fee of €25.5 million, at the time, the most expensive signing on the continent.

== International career ==
On 3 March 2023, Roque was called for the first time for the Brazil national team by interim head coach Ramon Menezes to play in a friendly match against Morocco on 25 March 2023. He was substituted on in the 65th minute of the game in a 2–1 defeat at the Ibn Batouta Stadium.

== Personal life ==
Roque married Dayana Lins shortly before he joined Barcelona. He is a Christian.

== Career statistics ==
=== Club ===
As of match played 8 November 2026

Appearances and goals by club, season and competition
| Club | Season | League | | | State league (Note: Includes Campeonato Mineiro, Campeonato Paranaense, Campeonato Paulista) | | National cup (Note: Includes Copa do Brasil, Copa del Rey) | | Continental | | Other | | Total | |
| Club | Season | Division | Apps | Goals | Apps | Goals | Apps | Goals | Apps | Goals | Apps | Goals | Apps | Goals |
|---|---|---|---|---|---|---|---|---|---|---|---|---|---|---|
| Cruzeiro | 2021 | Série B | 5 | 0 | — | | — | | — | | — | | 5 | 0 |
| Cruzeiro | 2022 | Série B | 1 | 0 | 8 | 3 | 2 | 3 | — | | — | | 11 | 6 |
| Cruzeiro | Total | | 6 | 0 | 8 | 3 | 2 | 3 | — | | — | | 16 | 6 |
| Athletico Paranaense | 2022 | Série A | 29 | 5 | — | | — | | 7 (Note: Appearances in Copa Libertadores) | 2 | — | | 36 | 7 |
| Athletico Paranaense | 2023 | Série A | 25 | 12 | 6 | 4 | 6 | 1 | 8 | 4 | — | | 45 | 21 |
| Athletico Paranaense | Total | | 54 | 17 | 6 | 4 | 6 | 1 | 15 | 6 | — | | 81 | 28 |
| Barcelona | 2023–24 | La Liga | 14 | 2 | — | | 2 | 0 | 0 | 0 | 0 | 0 | 16 | 2 |
| Betis (loan) | 2024–25 | La Liga | 22 | 4 | — | | 4 | 3 | 7 (Note: Appearances in UEFA Conference League) | 0 | — | | 33 | 7 |
| Palmeiras | 2025 | Série A | 33 | 16 | 3 | 0 | 4 | 0 | 11 | 4 | 5 (Note: Appearances in FIFA Club World Cup) | 0 | 56 | 20 |
| Palmeiras | 2026 | Série A | 20 | 5 | 10 | 3 | 7 | 0 | 4 | 1 | — | | 41 | 9 |
| Palmeiras | Total | | 53 | 21 | 13 | 3 | 11 | 0 | 15 | 5 | 5 | 0 | 97 | 29 |
| Career total | | | 148 | 43 | 28 | 11 | 25 | 7 | 37 | 11 | 5 | 0 | 243 | 72 |

=== International ===
As of match played 18 November 2025

Appearances and goals by national team and year
| National team | Year | Apps | Goals |
|---|---|---|---|
| Brazil | 2023 | 1 | 0 |
| Brazil | 2025 | 1 | 0 |
| Total | | 2 | 0 |

== Honours ==
Athletico Paranaense

- Campeonato Paranaense: 2023
- Copa Libertadores runner-up: 2022

Palmeiras

- Campeonato Paulista: 2026
- Copa Libertadores runner-up: 2025

Brazil U20

- South American U-20 Championship: 2023

Individual

- Copa Libertadores Team of the Tournament: 2022
- South American U-20 Championship Top scorer: 2023
- IFFHS Men's CONMEBOL (U20) Team: 2023, 2024
- Troféu Mesa Redonda Team of the Year: 2025
- Bola de Prata: 2025
- Campeonato Brasileiro Série A Team of the Year: 2025
- Campeonato Paulista Team of the Year: 2026
