= Biceps femoris tendon rupture =

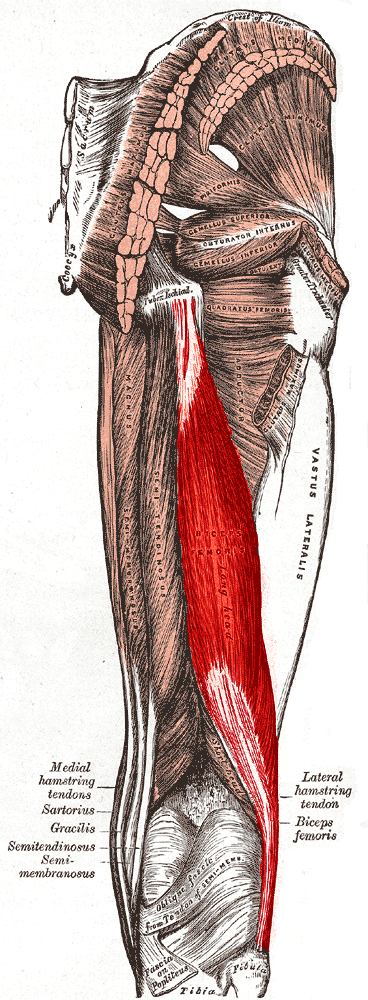
- Biceps femoris muscle

Biceps femoris tendon rupture can occur when the biceps femoris is injured in sports that require explosive bending of the knee as seen in sprinting. If the athlete is fatigued or has not warmed up properly they may suffer a hamstring strain/rupture, which is the tearing of the hamstring muscle. Avulsion of the biceps femoris tendon is the complete pulling away of the tendon from the bone. This most commonly occurs where the long head attaches to the ischial tuberosity. Injuries to biceps femoris are more common than to other hamstring muscles.

One theory for this is the fact that each of the two heads are innervated by different branches of the sciatic nerve. In states of fatigue or when the muscle is not fully warmed up, uncoordinated firing of the nerves may cause the muscle to contract inappropriately during movement, leading to injury. Biceps femoris tendon avulsion may also be associated with an avulsion fracture which occurs when a piece of the bone is pulled away with the tendon, during forceful contraction.

Isolated avulsion is rare.

== Symptoms and signs ==
- Avulsions normally occur during a rapid or violent movement involving hip flexion and knee extension and are known to be extremely painful
- Swelling will appear in the region of the avulsion
- an associated loss in hamstring strength (i.e. a decreased ability to flex the knee joint against resistance)
- In some avulsion fractures, the bone fragment may be palpated through the skin

The R.I.C.E. technique should be administered, however, a sports injury specialist is recommended for the possibility of surgery.
