= 2023 Supercopa de España final =

Final of the 39th edition of Supercopa de España

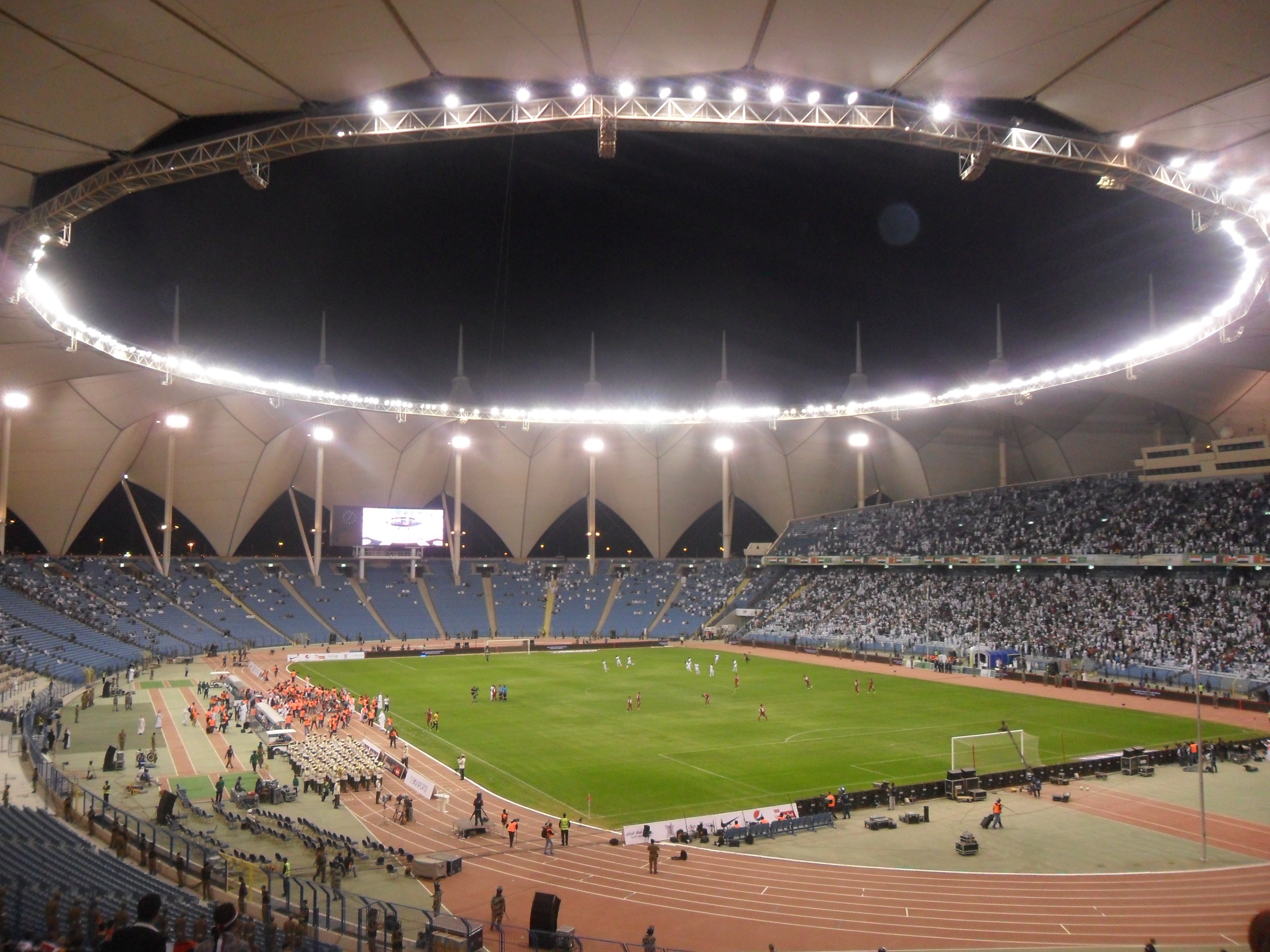
- The King Fahd International Stadium in Riyadh hosted the final.
- Event: 2023 Supercopa de España
Real Madrid	Barcelona
1	3
- Date: 15 January 2023
- Venue: King Fahd International Stadium, Riyadh
- Man of the Match: Gavi (Barcelona)
- Referee: Ricardo de Burgos Bengoetxea (Basque Country)
- Attendance: 57,340
- Weather: Clear; 14 °C (57 °F); 88% humidity

The 2023 Supercopa de España final was a football match that decided the winner of the 2023 Supercopa de España, the 39th edition of the annual Spanish football super cup competition. The match was played on 15 January 2023 at the King Fahd International Stadium in Riyadh, Saudi Arabia. The match was 'El Clásico' between the 2021–22 La Liga winners Real Madrid and its runners-up Barcelona, the eighth time both clubs played each other in the competition's decisive tie (until 2020 its format was simply a two-legged match; the teams were meeting in their first final under the four-team setup having played a semi-final in 2022).

Barcelona won the match 3–1 for their 14th Supercopa de España title.

== Teams ==
Team	Qualification for tournament	Previous finals appearances (bold indicates winners)
Real Madrid	2021–22 La Liga winners	17 (1982, **1988**, **1989**, (Note: Real Madrid won the double in 1988–89, and thus were automatically awarded the Supercopa de España title for 1989.) **1990**, **1993**, 1995, **1997**, **2001**, **2003**, 2007, **2008**, 2011, **2012**, 2014, **2017**, **2020**, **2022**)
Barcelona	2021–22 La Liga runners-up	24 (**1983**, 1985, 1988, 1990, **1991**, **1992**, 1993, **1994**, **1996**, 1997, 1998, 1999, **2005**, **2006**, **2009**, **2010**, **2011**, 2012, **2013**, 2015, **2016**, 2017, **2018**, 2021)

== Route to the final ==
Real Madrid		Round	Barcelona	
Opponent	Result	2022–23 Supercopa de España	Opponent	Result
Valencia	1–1 (a.e.t.), 4–3 (p)	Semi-finals	Real Betis	2–2 (a.e.t.), 4–2 (p)

== Match ==
=== Details ===
15 January 2023
22:00 AST

Real Madrid	1–3	Barcelona
Benzema 90+3'	Report	Gavi 33'; Lewandowski 45'; Pedri 69'

King Fahd International Stadium, Riyadh
Attendance: 57,340
Referee: Ricardo de Burgos Bengoetxea (Basque Country)

**Real Madrid**	**Barcelona**

GK	1	(Belgium) Thibaut Courtois
RB	2	(Spain) Dani Carvajal		(substituted off) 72'
CB	3	(Brazil) Éder Militão
CB	22	(Germany) Antonio Rüdiger
LB	23	(France) Ferland Mendy	(yellow card) 32'
DM	8	(Germany) Toni Kroos		(substituted off) 72'
CM	10	(Croatia) Luka Modrić		(substituted off) 65'
CM	12	(France) Eduardo Camavinga		(substituted off) 46'
RF	15	(Uruguay) Federico Valverde	(yellow card) 82'
CF	9	(France) Karim Benzema (c)
LF	20	(Brazil) Vinícius Júnior
Substitutes:
GK	13	(Ukraine) Andriy Lunin
GK	26	(Spain) Luis López
DF	5	(Spain) Jesús Vallejo
DF	6	(Spain) Nacho		(substituted on) 72'
DF	16	(Spain) Álvaro Odriozola
MF	19	(Spain) Dani Ceballos		(substituted on) 65'
MF	31	(Spain) Mario Martín
FW	7	(Belgium) Eden Hazard
FW	11	(Spain) Marco Asensio		(substituted on) 72'
FW	21	(Brazil) Rodrygo		(substituted on) 46'
FW	24	(Dominican Republic) Mariano
Manager:
(Italy) Carlo Ancelotti

GK	1	(Germany) Marc-André ter Stegen
RB	4	(Uruguay) Ronald Araújo	(yellow card) 68'	(substituted off) 86'
CB	23	(France) Jules Koundé
CB	15	(Denmark) Andreas Christensen	(yellow card) 49'
LB	28	(Spain) Alejandro Balde
DM	5	(Spain) Sergio Busquets (c)
CM	21	(Netherlands) Frenkie de Jong		(substituted off) 87'
CM	30	(Spain) Gavi		(substituted off) 90'
RF	7	(France) Ousmane Dembélé		(substituted off) 78'
CF	9	(Poland) Robert Lewandowski
LF	8	(Spain) Pedri		(substituted off) 90'
Substitutes:
GK	13	(Spain) Iñaki Peña
GK	36	(Spain) Arnau Tenas
DF	17	(Spain) Marcos Alonso
DF	18	(Spain) Jordi Alba
DF	24	(Spain) Eric García		(substituted on) 86'
MF	19	(Ivory Coast) Franck Kessié		(substituted on) 87'
MF	20	(Spain) Sergi Roberto		(substituted on) 90'
FW	10	(Spain) Ansu Fati		(substituted on) 90'
FW	11	(Spain) Ferran Torres
FW	14	(Netherlands) Memphis Depay
FW	22	(Brazil) Raphinha		(substituted on) 78'
Manager:
(Spain) Xavi

Man of the Match:
Gavi (Barcelona)

Assistant referees:
Roberto Díaz Pérez del Palomar (Basque Country)
Jon Núñez Fernández (Basque Country)
Fourth official:
Alejandro Muñiz Ruiz (Galicia)
Reserve assistant referee:
Diego Sánchez Rojo (Galicia)
Video assistant referee:
José Luis González González (Castile and León)
Assistant video assistant referee:
Juan Luis Pulido Santana (Las Palmas)

**Match rules**

- 90 minutes.
- 30 minutes of extra time if necessary.
- Penalty shoot-out if scores still level.
- Eleven named substitutes.
- Maximum of five substitutions, with a sixth allowed in extra time. (Note: Each team was given only three opportunities to make substitutions, with a fourth opportunity in extra time, excluding substitutions made at half-time, before the start of extra time and at half-time in extra time.)

== See also ==
- 2022–23 FC Barcelona season
- 2022–23 Real Madrid CF season
