= 2022–23 FC Barcelona season =

124th season of FC Barcelona

Barcelona
2022–23 season
- President: Joan Laporta
- Head coach: Xavi
- Stadium: Camp Nou
- La Liga: 1st
- Copa del Rey: Semi-finals
- Supercopa de España: Winners
- UEFA Champions League: Group stage
- UEFA Europa League: Knockout round play-offs
- Top goalscorer: League: Robert Lewandowski (23); All: Robert Lewandowski (33)
- Highest home attendance: 95,745 vs Real Madrid (19 March 2023)
- Lowest home attendance: 72,010 vs Cádiz (19 February 2023)
- Average home league attendance: 83,498
- Biggest win: Home: Barcelona 4–0 Valladolid; Barcelona 5–1 Viktoria Plzeň; Barcelona 4–0 Athletic Bilbao; Barcelona 4–0 Real Betis; Away: Ceuta 0–5 Barcelona
- Biggest defeat: Home: Barcelona 0–4 Real Madrid; Away: Bayern Munich 2–0 Barcelona; Real Madrid 3–1 Barcelona; Valladolid 3–1 Barcelona
| Home colours | Away colours | Third colours |

The 2022–23 Futbol Club Barcelona season was the club's 124th season in existence and their 92nd consecutive season in the top flight. In addition to the domestic league, Barcelona participated in this season's editions of the Copa del Rey, the Supercopa de España, the UEFA Champions League (entering for the 19th consecutive season), and the UEFA Europa League. The season covered the period from 1 July 2022 until 30 June 2023.

This was the last season for Barcelona's defender Gerard Piqué, who retired before the winter World Cup. Piqué had spent fifteen seasons with Barcelona and won thirty official trophies with the club. Furthermore, captain Sergio Busquets announced that he would leave the club at the end of the season after eighteen years with Barcelona, having won 32 trophies with the Catalans. This was also Jordi Alba's last season at Barcelona after eleven years, having won nineteen trophies with the club.

On 15 January 2023, Barcelona clinched their first trophy since 2021 by defeating Real Madrid 3–1 in the Supercopa de España final. On 14 May 2023, Barcelona mathematically clinched their 27th La Liga title with four games to spare, the first since the 2018–19 season.

== Kits ==
- Supplier: Nike
- Sponsors: Spotify (front) (Note: In the two El Clásico league matches, the sponsors were Drake and Rosalía.) / AMBILIGHT TV (left sleeve) (Note: Only worn in the last two league matches.) / UNHCR – The UN Refugee Agency (back)

| Home | Home alt. | Away | Third |
| Fourth | Goalkeeper 1 | Goalkeeper 2 | Goalkeeper 3 |

== Season overview ==
=== Pre-season ===
On 12 May, Barcelona announced reaching an agreement with Aston Villa for the transfer of Philippe Coutinho for €20 million. A week later, Barcelona announced they would be touring the United States to play two friendlies against Inter Miami on 19 July and New York Red Bulls on 30 July.

On 6 June, Barcelona announced that the pre-season would start with the players' medical examinations on 4 July. Two days later, the club also announced reaching an agreement for the sale of Ferran Jutglà to Club Brugge for €5 million. Two days after that, Barcelona announced that they would also be playing against Real Madrid on 23 July and Juventus on 26 July.

On 15 June, Barcelona announced the signing of Pablo Torre from Racing Santander for a fee of €5 million. Dani Alves also announced that day that he would be leaving the club, when his contract expires at the end of June. On 30 June, Barcelona and Sixth Street reached an agreement for the acquisition of a 10% share of the club's La Liga TV rights, with Barcelona generating a total capital gain of €267 million for the current season. Sixth Street would initially invest €207.5 million and in return would receive 10% of the club's La Liga TV rights for the next 25 years.

On 1 July, Barcelona announced that Adama Traoré and Luuk de Jong would be leaving the club after completing their loan stint. Three days later, Barcelona announced the signing of Franck Kessié from A.C. Milan, and Andreas Christensen from Chelsea, both on free transfers. On 8 July, Barcelona and Tottenham Hotspur reached an agreement for the loan of Clément Lenglet for the rest of the season. Three days later, Barcelona and Watford reached an agreement for transfer of Rey Manaj.

On 13 July, Barcelona played their first pre-season friendly versus Olot, which ended in a draw 1–1 from a poor Barcelona side. That day, Barcelona and Leeds United reached an agreement for transfer of Raphinha for €48 million, with the fee potentially rising to €60 million. Barcelona also reached an agreement with Sporting to loan Francisco Trincão for reported €3 million until the end of the season with an option to buy. Three days later, Barcelona and Bayern Munich reached an agreement for the transfer of Robert Lewandowski for €45 million, potentially rising to €50 million. Barcelona also announced the squad for the US tour, taking 28 players to play four pre-season matches there.

On 19 July, Barcelona started the US tour with a 0–6 win over Inter Miami at DRV PNK Stadium in Fort Lauderdale, Florida. Later on, the club announced reaching an agreement with Gorica for the transfer of Moussa Wagué. Two days later, Barcelona sold an additional 15% of the club's La Liga TV right to Sixth Street. In total, Sixth Street would receive 25% of the club's La Liga TV rights for the next 25 years.

On 23 July, Barcelona won their second game of the US tour 0–1 over Real Madrid at the Allegiant Stadium in Paradise, Nevada. Three days later, Barcelona drew 2–2 against Juventus in Dallas, with Ousmane Dembélé scoring a brace. On 28 July, Barcelona reached a verbal agreement to sign French defender Jules Koundé from Sevilla. The next day, Barcelona announced the signing of Koundé on a 5-year contract for a fee of €50 million. In their final match of the US tour on 30 July, Barcelona defeated the New York Red Bulls 0–2 in Harrison, New Jersey, with Ousmane Dembélé and Memphis Depay scoring a goal each. Later on, the club reached an agreement with Celta de Vigo for the transfer of Óscar Mingueza for €3 million.

=== August ===
On 1 August, Barcelona announced the activation of the third 'economic lever', selling 24.5% of Barça Studios to Socios.com for €100 million "to accelerate the club's audiovisual, blockchain, NFT and Web.3 strategy". Three days later, Riqui Puig left for LA Galaxy on a free transfer.

On 7 August, Barcelona and Neto reached an agreement for the termination of his contract. Later on, the club concluded the pre-season with a 6–0 victory over Mexican club Pumas UNAM, winning the Joan Gamper Trophy for the 45th time. Pedri scored a brace, while Robert Lewandowski, Ousmane Dembélé, Pierre-Emerick Aubameyang and Frenkie de Jong contributed to the victory with a goal each.

On 12 August, Barcelona announced the activation of the fourth 'economic lever', selling an additional 24.5% of Barça Studios to Orpheus Media. The next day, Barcelona were held to a goalless draw against Rayo Vallecano at Camp Nou in the first league match of the season. The new signings Robert Lewandowski, Raphinha, Andreas Christensen and Franck Kessié made their competitive debuts in this match. Later on, Nico González was loaned to Valencia. Two days after that, Álex Collado also joined Elche on loan.

On 21 August, the team got their first league win of the season, after they beat Real Sociedad 1–4 away. Robert Lewandowski scored twice, his first goals for the club, with the other two goals coming from Ousmane Dembélé and Ansu Fati.

On 24 August, Barcelona drew 3–3 against Manchester City at Camp Nou, in a charity match to raise funds in the fight against ALS. Pierre-Emerick Aubameyang, Frenkie de Jong and Memphis Depay scored for the Blaugrana. The next day, Samuel Umtiti departed for Lecce on loan.

On 28 August, Barça defeated Real Valladolid 4–0 with goals coming from Pedri, Sergi Roberto, and a brace from Robert Lewandowski. Jules Koundé made his competitive debut in this match.

=== September ===
On 1 September, Barcelona announced reaching agreements with Martin Braithwaite to terminate his contract and with Chelsee on the transfer of Pierre Emerick Aubameyang for €12 million. The same day, Sergiño Dest and Abde Ezzalzouli were loaned to AC Milan and Osasuna respectively, and the club confirmed the signing of former La Masia graduate Héctor Bellerín from Arsenal. The next day, Barcelona also announced the signing of Marcos Alonso from Chelsea.

On 3 September, Barcelona beat Sevilla 0–3 away. Raphinha and Eric García both scored their first goals for the club with the other goal coming from Robert Lewandowski. Four days later, Barcelona started the UEFA Champions League group stage with a big 5–1 win against Viktoria Plzeň in Group C. Robert Lewandowski scored his first hat-trick for the club, Franck Kessié scored his first goal for the club, a goal from Ferran Torres completed the victory, and Pablo Torre came off the bench late on to make his debut for the club. On the same day, Barcelona reached an agreement with midfielder Miralem Pjanić to terminate his contract.

On 10 September, Barcelona beat Cádiz 0–4 away. Robert Lewandowski, Frenkie de Jong, Ansu Fati and Ousmane Dembélé got on the scoresheet with a goal each, while Héctor Bellerín and Marcos Alonso both made their debuts for the club. Three days later, Barcelona suffered a 2–0 defeat against Bayern Munich.

On 17 September, Barcelona won 3–0 against Elche, and achieved their best league start in the last five years, achieving 16 points out of a possible 18 from the first six matches. Robert Lewandowski scored a brace and the other goal came from Memphis Depay.

=== October ===
On 1 October, Barcelona continued their good form after the international break with another win, this time a 0–1 away win against Mallorca. Robert Lewandowski scored the only goal of the match. Three days later, Barcelona suffered a narrow 1–0 defeat against Inter Milan under controversial circumstances after Pedri had scored in the 67th minute, but it was ruled out by Video Assistant Referee (VAR) for a controversial handball by Ansu Fati. It was a night of controversy at the San Siro from VAR decisions, with another notable incident coming towards the end of the match when Denzel Dumfries appeared to handle the ball in the penalty area while trying to redirect a cross, however it was controversially ruled he had not conclusively knocked a cross away from Ansu Fati with his wrist.

On 9 October, the team got their seventh league win in a row after winning 1–0 against Celta Vigo, with the only goal of the match coming from Pedri. Three days later, Barça were held to a dramatic 3–3 draw in the return fixture against Inter Milan at Camp Nou. Two goals from Robert Lewandowski and another goal from Ousmane Dembélé were not enough to give the team a much needed win in the Champions League, which left them in the risky position of not making it out of the group for the second consecutive season.

On 16 October, Barcelona suffered their first league defeat of the season, after losing 3–1 against Real Madrid in the first El Clásico of the season. Ferran Torres scored the only goal for the team. Four days later, Barcelona defeated Villarreal 3–0, thanks to a brace from Robert Lewandowski and a goal from Ansu Fati. Three days after that, the team crushed Athletic Bilbao 4–0, with Ousmane Dembélé, Sergi Roberto, Robert Lewandowski and Ferran Torres getting on the scoresheet with a goal each.

On 26 October, Barça suffered a 0–3 defeat against Bayern Munich in the return fixture. The defeat meant that Barcelona were eliminated from the Champions League and couldn't advance from the group stages for the second season in a row, and were relegated to the UEFA Europa League knockout stage for the second consecutive season. It was the first time since 1999 that the Catalan club failed to advance to the knockout stage of the Champions League in consecutive years, coinciding with the departure of Lionel Messi to Paris Saint-Germain two seasons ago. Three days later, Barcelona ended the month with a narrow 0–1 away victory against Valencia, with Robert Lewandowski scoring the only goal of the match.

=== November ===
On 1 November, Barcelona ended their Champions League campaign with a 2–4 away win against Viktoria Plzeň. Ferran Torres scored twice, while both Marcos Alonso and Pablo Torre both scored their first goals for the club. Iñaki Peña and Marc Casadó also made their debuts for the club.

On 3 November, Barça's legend Gerard Piqué announced his retirement from football by releasing a heartfelt video on his social media accounts, having enjoyed a trophy-laden 14 years at the club since returning from Manchester United in 2008, during which he played 615 games for the team.

On 5 November, the team beat Almería 2–0 with the goals coming from Ousmane Dembélé and Frenkie de Jong. Gerard Piqué played his final match for FC Barcelona in front of 92,605 fans who were gathered at Camp Nou to bid farewell to the club legend who was given an emotional standing ovation. There was a huge banner on the pitch that said 'Sempr3' (For3ver) and a video celebrating Piqué's career was played on the big screen to the fans as well. On the same day, Robert Lewandowski was awarded La Liga Player of the Month award for the month of October 2022.

On 8 November, Barcelona finished the first half of the season with a 1–2 away victory against Osasuna, with the goals coming from Pedri and Raphinha. Chadi Riad also made his debut for the club. This was the last match for the team before the mid-season break for the 2022 FIFA World Cup.

=== December ===
After the mid-season break for the World Cup, Barcelona returned to action on the last day of the year, when they played Espanyol in the Barcelona derby. The hard-fought, tense and fiery derby ended in a 1–1 draw, with Marcos Alonso scoring the only goal for the team and the last goal of the year for the Blaugrana.

=== January ===
On 4 January, Barcelona started the new year with a 3–4 away win after extra-time against third-division side Intercity in their first match in the Copa del Rey. Ronald Araújo, Ousmane Dembélé, Raphinha and Ansu Fati contributed a goal each to help the team advance to the next round. Four days later, the team got a hard-fought 0–1 away win against Atlético Madrid in the league. Ousmane Dembélé scored the only goal of the match.

On 12 January, Barcelona advanced to the Supercopa de España final after they beat Real Betis 2–4 on penalties in the semi-finals, after the match had ended in a 2–2 draw after extra-time. Three days later, Barcelona clinched their first trophy since 2021 by beating Real Madrid 1–3 in the Supercopa de España final. Gavi, Robert Lewandowski and Pedri scored a goal each.

On 19 January, the team got a dominant away win against third-division side Ceuta, beating them 0–5 thanks to goals from Raphinha, Ansu Fati, Franck Kessié and a brace from Robert Lewandowski, and advancing to the quarter-finals of the Copa del Rey. Ángel Alarcón made his debut for the club in this match. A day later, Barcelona announced that they had reached an agreement for the transfer of Memphis Depay to Atlético Madrid for €3 million plus one million in variables.

On 22 January, the team got a 1–0 win in the league against Getafe, thanks to a goal scored by Pedri. Three days later, Barcelona advanced to the semi-finals of the Copa del Rey after they beat Real Sociedad 1–0 in the quarter-finals, thanks to an Ousmane Dembélé goal.

On 28 January, Barcelona got a narrow 0–1 away win in the league against Girona, with Pedri scoring the only goal of the match. Three days later, Barcelona announced that they had reached an agreement for the transfer of Héctor Bellerín to Sporting for €1 million.

=== February ===
On 1 February, Barcelona got a 1–2 away win against Real Betis, with Raphinha and Robert Lewandowski scoring a goal each. Four days later, the team defeated Sevilla 3–0 to move eight points clear at the top of the league table. Jordi Alba, Gavi and Raphinha got on the scoresheet with a goal each.

On 12 February, Barcelona beat Villarreal 0–1 away, thanks to a goal from Pedri. Four days later, Barcelona drew 2–2 against Manchester United at the Camp Nou in the first leg of the Europa League knockout round play-offs, with Marcos Alonso and Raphinha scoring for the team.

On 19 February, the team won 2–0 against Cádiz, thanks to goals from Sergi Roberto and Robert Lewandowski. Four days later, on the away leg of the Europa League knockout round play-offs at Old Trafford, Barcelona suffered a 2–1 loss against Manchester United and exited the tournament with a 4–3 aggregate score. Robert Lewandowski scored the only goal for the team. Barcelona ended the month with a shock 1–0 defeat away to Almería on 26 February.

=== March ===
On 2 March, Barcelona got a narrow 0–1 away win against Real Madrid in the first leg of the Copa del Rey semi-finals thanks to an own goal from Éder Militão. In this match, Sergio Busquets made his 46th appearance in the El Clásico breaking the record for the most El Clásico appearances ever by a player, previously held by Lionel Messi and Sergio Ramos, both of whom had made 45 appearances.

On 5 March, Barcelona defeated Valencia 1–0, getting their 20th win of the season in La Liga. Raphinha scored the only goal of the match, extending the team's lead at the top of the league table to 9 points. Ferran Torres also missed a penalty in the 55th minute and in the 59th minute, Ronald Araújo got sent-off after committing a last-man foul, for which he was suspended for the next league match against Athletic Bilbao.

On 12 March, Barcelona beat Athletic Bilbao 0–1 away, with Raphinha scoring the only goal of the match. The win helped keep the 9 point lead at the top of the table ahead of the El Clásico. This was Barcelona's 19th clean sheet in the league in which they have conceded only eight goals in 25 matches, breaking the record for fewest goals conceded after 25 matches, held jointly by Deportivo La Coruña in the 1993–94 season and Atlético Madrid in the 1990–91 season, both teams conceding 10 goals in 25 games.

On 19 March, Barcelona defeated Real Madrid 2–1 in the league's second El Clásico. This win put the team 12 points in front at the top of the table and was also Barcelona's 100th competitive El Clásico win, and third consecutive win against Real Madrid across all competitions. Franck Kessié scored the winning goal in the 92nd minute, aside from getting the team closer to winning the league title, the goal had another special significance as it was Barcelona's 3,000th goal scored in La Liga at the Camp Nou.

=== April ===
After the international break, the team continued where they left off, winning against Elche 0–4 away on the first day of the month. Robert Lewandowski scored a brace, while Ansu Fati and Ferran Torres scored one goal each. Aleix Garrido also made his debut for the club. Goalkeeper Marc-André ter Stegen also recorded his 150th clean sheet since joining the club in 2014. Four days later, Barcelona got eliminated from the Copa del Rey after they suffered a 0–4 home loss (1–4 on aggregate) against Real Madrid in the return leg of the Copa del Rey semi-finals.

On 10 April, the team got held to a goalless draw against Girona at home, and maintained their unbeaten home league record, extending the lead to 13 points at the top of the league table. Six days later, Barcelona got held to another scoreless draw, this time against Getafe away.

On 23 April, Barcelona took a narrow 1–0 victory against Atlético Madrid with the only goal of the match coming from Ferran Torres at the end of the first half. Marc-André ter Stegen equalled the club record for most clean sheets in the league in a season, previously achieved by Claudio Bravo in the 2014–15 season, in which he kept 23 clean sheets in the league. Three days later, Barcelona suffered their third league defeat of the season, losing against Rayo Vallecano 2–1 away. Robert Lewandowski scored the only goal for the team.

Barcelona ended the month with a 4–0 win against Real Betis on 29 April. The match featured the returns from injuries of Ousmane Dembélé and Andreas Christensen, who scored his first goal for the club. Aside from Christensen's goal, Robert Lewandowski and Raphinha also contributed to the win with a goal each, and the last goal was an own goal scored by Real Betis' midfielder Guido Rodríguez. The match also had a special significance because 15-year-old La Masia graduate Lamine Yamal became the youngest ever appearance maker for Barça smashing the record which had been held by Armand Martinez Sagi since 2 April 1922. Martinez Sagi was aged 15 years, 11 months and five days when he appeared in a 1–1 draw against Sporting de Gijón.

=== May ===
On 2 May, Barça got a hard-fought 1–0 victory against Osasuna. Jordi Alba was the hero after coming on as a substitute in the 76th minute and scoring with an astonishing volley in 85th minute to give the team the win in epic fashion. Marc-André ter Stegen broke the club all-time record for most league clean sheets in a single season by achieving 25 league clean sheets this season, beating the 24 clean sheets record previously achieved by Andoni Zubizarreta in the 1986–87 season, and the most league clean sheets kept in a season in the 21st century, 23 clean sheets previously achieved by Claudio Bravo in the 2014–15 season. If Barcelona defeat city rivals Espanyol they could win La Liga.

On 10 May, Barcelona captain Sergio Busquets announced he would be leaving the club after 18 years and 722 appearances, the third highest in the club's history after Leo Messi and Xavi. During that time he has scored 18 goals and provided 40 assists. He has won 32 trophies with the club. Four days later, Barcelona won their 27th La Liga title and the first since the 2018–19 season, after they beat Espanyol 2–4 away from home. Robert Lewandowski scored twice and both Alejandro Balde and Jules Koundé scored their first goals for the club.

On 20 May, Barcelona were defeated 1–2 by Real Sociedad in what was their first and only league home defeat of the season, with Robert Lewandowski scoring the only goal for the team. After the match finished, captain Sergio Busquets lifted the La Liga trophy in front of 88,049 fans present at Camp Nou. Three days later, the team lost 3–1 away to Real Valladolid. Robert Lewandowski was the only one on the scoresheet for the Blaugrana.

On 24 May, Barcelona defender Jordi Alba announced that he would be leaving the club at the end of the season after reaching a mutual agreement with the club to terminate his contract one year before it was due to expire. Jordi Alba will be leaving the club after 11 years. During that time he has scored 26 goals and provided 91 assists. He has won 18 trophies with the club.

On 28 May, Barcelona played their last home match of the season at the Camp Nou, where 88,775 fans were gathered to bid farewell to the iconic stadium and its special and unique open plan look, which it has had for 66 years, since its opening in 1957; before renovations of the stadium as part of the plan "Espai Barça" ("Barça Space") begin in the summer. Barcelona marked the special occasion with a 3–0 win over Mallorca, with Ansu Fati scoring twice and Gavi scoring once. It was also a special occasion since it was the last match at the Camp Nou for both club legends Sergio Busquets and Jordi Alba, both of whom played for 80 minutes and came off the pitch to a long and emotional standing ovation and applause from the spectators. Marc-André ter Stegen earned his 26th clean sheet of the season, equalling the all-time record in the league, set by Deportivo La Coruña's Francisco Liaño in the 1993–94 season. Tributes were made before and after the match to honor Sergio Busquets, Jordi Alba and the Camp Nou.

=== June ===
On 4 June, Barcelona suffered a 2–1 away defeat against Celta Vigo in their last competitive match of the season. The only goal for the team came from Ansu Fati. Robert Lewandowski secured the Pichichi Trophy after ending the league campaign with 23 goals – the most in the league. Marc-André ter Stegen was aiming to secure two historic records in this match: the most league clean sheets in a season in history (top 5 leagues) and the least league goals conceded in a season; although he did not manage to secure either, he now holds both records alongside Francisco Liaño, both having kept 26 clean sheets and having conceded 18 goals in a league season. Ter Stegen also secured the Zamora Trophy for having the lowest goals-to-games ratio in the league (0.49).

On 6 June, Barcelona ended the season with a friendly match in Japan against Japanese side Vissel Kobe, in honor of Barcelona legend Andrés Iniesta who played his last match for Vissel Kobe after five years at the Japanese club. Barcelona got a comfortable 2–0 win in front of 47,335 fans at the Japan National Stadium in Tokyo. Franck Kessié and Eric García got on the scoresheet with a goal each. It was a match of debuts, with Barcelona B youngsters Dani Rodríguez, Pau Prim, Héctor Fort, Marc Guiu, Unai Hernández, and new signing Julián Araujo, making their debuts for the first team. Andrés Iniesta left the pitch in the 80th minute to warm applause before being given a hug on the touchline from Barcelona manager and former midfield partner Xavi. Iniesta made 674 appearances for Barcelona from 2002 to 2018, winning 30 trophies.

== Management team ==
| Position | Name |
|---|---|
| Head coach | (Spain) Xavi |
| Assistant coaches | (Spain) Òscar Hernández, (Spain) Sergio Alegre |
| Goalkeeping coach | (Spain) José Ramón de la Fuente |
| Fitness coaches | (Spain) Iván Torres, (Spain) Andrés Martín, (Spain) Edu Pons, (Spain) David Pozos, (Spain) Milos Mallol |
| Analysts | (Spain) Toni Lobo, (Spain) David Prats, (Spain) Sergio Garcia, (Spain) Eloiy Jordan, (Spain) Joan Barbarà |

- Source: FC Barcelona Annual Report 2022/23

== Players ==
=== First team ===
| N | Pos. | Nat. | Name | Age | EU | Since | App | Goals | Ends | Transfer fee | Notes |
Goalkeepers
| 1 | GK | (Germany) | Marc-André ter Stegen (4th captain) | 31 | EU | 2014 | 377 | 0 | 2025 | €12M | |
| 13/26 | GK | (Spain) | Iñaki Peña | 24 | EU | 2021 | 5 | 0 | 2026 | Youth system | |
Defenders
| 4 | DF | (Uruguay) | Ronald Araújo | 24 | Non-EU | 2019 | 113 | 7 | 2026 | €1.7M | |
| 15 | DF | (Denmark) | Andreas Christensen | 27 | EU | 2022 | 32 | 1 | 2026 | Free | |
| 17 | DF | (Spain) | Marcos Alonso | 32 | EU | 2022 | 37 | 3 | 2024 | Free | |
| 18 | DF | (Spain) | Jordi Alba (3rd captain) | 34 | EU | 2012 | 458 | 26 | 2024 | €14M | Originally from Youth system |
| 23 | DF | (France) | Jules Koundé | 24 | EU | 2022 | 40 | 1 | 2027 | €50M | |
| 24 | DF | (Spain) | Eric García | 22 | EU | 2021 | 68 | 1 | 2026 | Free | Originally from Youth system |
Midfielders
| 5 | MF | (Spain) | Sergio Busquets (captain) | 34 | EU | 2008 | 722 | 18 | 2023 | Youth system | |
| 6/30 (Note: Gavi worn number 6 in La Liga and Copa del Rey matches played from January 31 until March 25.) | MF | (Spain) | Gavi | 18 | EU | 2021 | 96 | 5 | 2026 | Youth system | |
| 8 | MF | (Spain) | Pedri | 20 | EU | 2020 | 109 | 16 | 2026 | €5M | |
| 19 | MF | (Ivory Coast) | Franck Kessié | 26 | EU | 2022 | 43 | 3 | 2026 | Free | |
| 20 | MF | (Spain) | Sergi Roberto (vice captain) | 31 | EU | 2010 | 349 | 16 | 2024 | Youth system | |
| 21 | MF | (Netherlands) | Frenkie de Jong | 26 | EU | 2019 | 183 | 15 | 2026 | €75M | |
Forwards
| 7 | FW | (France) | Ousmane Dembélé | 26 | EU | 2017 | 185 | 40 | 2024 | €105M | |
| 9 | FW | (Poland) | Robert Lewandowski | 34 | EU | 2022 | 46 | 33 | 2026 | €45M | |
| 10 | FW | (Spain) | Ansu Fati | 20 | EU | 2019 | 109 | 29 | 2027 | Youth system | |
| 11 | FW | (Spain) | Ferran Torres | 23 | EU | 2022 (Winter) | 71 | 14 | 2027 | €55M | |
| 22 | FW | (Brazil) | Raphinha | 26 | EU | 2022 | 50 | 10 | 2027 | €58M | |

- Source: FCBarcelona.com, LaLiga.com and UEFA.com
- Ordered by squad number.

=== Reserve team ===
| N | Pos. | Nat. | Name | Age | EU | Since | App | Goals | Ends | Transfer fee | Notes |
|---|---|---|---|---|---|---|---|---|---|---|---|
| 27 | FW | (Spain) | Ilias Akhomach | 19 | EU | 2021 | 3 | 0 | 2023 | Youth system | |
| 28 | DF | (Spain) | Alejandro Balde | 19 | EU | 2021 | 51 | 1 | 2024 | Youth system | |
| 29 | DF | (Spain) | Marc Casadó | 19 | EU | 2022 | 1 | 0 | 2024 | Youth system | |
| 31 | GK | (Spain) | Ander Astralaga | 19 | EU | 2022 | 0 | 0 | 2023 | Youth system | |
| 32 | MF | (Spain) | Pablo Torre | 20 | EU | 2022 | 13 | 1 | 2026 | €5M | |
| 35 | DF | (Morocco) | Chadi Riad | 19 | EU | 2022 | 1 | 0 | 2024 | Youth system | Second nationality: Spain |
| 36 | GK | (Spain) | Arnau Tenas | 22 | EU | 2019 | 0 | 0 | 2023 | Youth system | |
| 38 | FW | (Spain) | Ángel Alarcón | 19 | EU | 2023 | 5 | 0 | 2025 | Youth system | |
| 39 | FW | (Spain) | Estanis Pedrola | 19 | EU | 2022 | 1 | 0 | 2024 | Youth system | |
| 40 | MF | (Spain) | Aleix Garrido | 19 | EU | 2021 | 1 | 0 | 2025 | Youth system | |
| 41 | FW | (Spain) | Lamine Yamal | 15 | EU | 2023 | 1 | 0 | 2024 | Youth system | |
| 43 | MF | (Spain) | Unai Hernández | 18 | EU | 2023 | 0 | 0 | 2023 | Youth system | |
| 44 | FW | (Spain) | Marc Guiu | 17 | EU | 2023 | 0 | 0 | 2025 | Youth system | |
| 46 | MF | (Spain) | Pau Prim | 17 | EU | 2023 | 0 | 0 | 2025 | Youth system | |
| 47 | FW | (Spain) | Dani Rodríguez | 17 | EU | 2023 | 0 | 0 | 2024 | Youth system | |

- Source: FCBarcelona.com, LaLiga.com and UEFA.com
- Ordered by squad number.

== Transfers ==
=== In ===
| No. | Pos. | Player | Transferred from | Fee | Date | Source |
|---|---|---|---|---|---|---|
| — | FW | (Portugal) Francisco Trincão | (England) Wolverhampton Wanderers | Loan return | 1 July 2022 | |
| — | FW | (Albania) Rey Manaj | (Italy) Spezia | Loan return | 1 July 2022 | |
| — | MF | (Bosnia and Herzegovina) Miralem Pjanić | (Turkey) Beşiktaş | Loan return | 1 July 2022 | |
| — | MF | (Spain) Álex Collado | Granada | Loan return | 1 July 2022 | |
| 26 | GK | (Spain) Iñaki Peña | (Turkey) Galatasaray | Loan return | 1 July 2022 | |
| 32 | MF | (Spain) Pablo Torre | Racing Santander | €5,000,000 | 1 July 2022 | |
| 19 | MF | (Ivory Coast) Franck Kessié | (Italy) Milan | Free transfer | 4 July 2022 | |
| 15 | DF | (Denmark) Andreas Christensen | (England) Chelsea | Free transfer | 4 July 2022 | |
| 22 | FW | (Brazil) Raphinha | (England) Leeds United | €58,000,000 (Note: Fee could rise to €65,000,000) | 13 July 2022 | |
| 9 | FW | (Poland) Robert Lewandowski | (Germany) Bayern Munich | €45,000,000 (Note: Fee could rise to €50,000,000) | 19 July 2022 | |
| 23 | DF | (France) Jules Koundé | Sevilla | €50,000,000 (Note: Fee could rise to €62,500,000) | 29 July 2022 | |
| 2 | DF | (Spain) Héctor Bellerín | (England) Arsenal | Free transfer | 1 September 2022 | |
| 17 | DF | (Spain) Marcos Alonso | (England) Chelsea | Free transfer | 2 September 2022 | |
| Total | | | | | €158,000,000 | |

=== Out ===
| No. | Pos. | Player | Transferred to | Fee | Date | Source |
|---|---|---|---|---|---|---|
| — | MF | (Brazil) Philippe Coutinho | (England) Aston Villa | €20,000,000 | 10 June 2022 (Note: The transfer was announced on 12 May, and would become official on 10 June once the transfer window opened) | |
| 8 | DF | (Brazil) Dani Alves | (Mexico) UNAM | Free transfer | 15 June 2022 | |
| 11 | FW | (Spain) Adama Traoré | (England) Wolverhampton Wanderers | Loan return | 1 July 2022 | |
| 17 | FW | (Netherlands) Luuk de Jong | Sevilla | Loan return | 1 July 2022 | |
| 29 | FW | (Spain) Ferran Jutglà | (Belgium) Club Brugge | €5,000,000 (Note: FC Barcelona will receive a 10% for any future sale.) | 1 July 2022 (Note: Deal agreed on 8 June 2022) | |
| — | FW | (Albania) Rey Manaj | (England) Watford | Free transfer (Note: Barcelona reserves a right of first refusal and 50% of any future sale.) | 11 July 2022 | |
| — | DF | (Senegal) Moussa Wagué | (Croatia) Gorica | Free transfer (Note: Barcelona will receive a percentage of any future sale.) | 19 July 2022 | |
| 22 | DF | (Spain) Óscar Mingueza | Celta Vigo | €3,000,000 (Note: Barcelona reserves a right to repurchase and 50% of any future sale.) | 30 July 2022 | |
| 6 | MF | (Spain) Riqui Puig | (United States) LA Galaxy | Free transfer (Note: Barcelona reserves a right to repurchase and 50% of any future sale.) | 4 August 2022 | |
| 13 | GK | (Brazil) Neto | (England) Bournemouth | Contract termination | 7 August 2022 | |
| 12 | FW | (Denmark) Martin Braithwaite | Espanyol | Contract termination | 1 September 2022 | |
| 17 | FW | (Gabon) Pierre-Emerick Aubameyang | (England) Chelsea | €12,000,000 | 1 September 2022 | |
| 16 | MF | (Bosnia and Herzegovina) Miralem Pjanić | (United Arab Emirates) Sharjah | Contract termination | 7 September 2022 | |
| 3 | DF | (Spain) Gerard Piqué | Retired | | 5 November 2022 | |
| 14 | FW | (Netherlands) Memphis Depay | (Spain) Atlético de Madrid | €3,000,000 | 20 January 2023 | |
| 2 | DF | (Spain) Héctor Bellerín | (Portugal) Sporting CP | €1,000,000 | 31 January 2023 | |
| Total | | | | | €44,000,000 | |

=== Loans out ===
| No. | Pos. | Player | Loaned to | Fee | Date | On loan until | Source |
|---|---|---|---|---|---|---|---|
| 15 | DF | (France) Clément Lenglet | (England) Tottenham Hotspur | None | 8 July 2022 | End of season | |
| — | FW | (Portugal) Francisco Trincão | (Portugal) Sporting CP | €3,000,000 (Note: Sporting CP has an option to buy 50% of the player rights for €7,000,000 at the end of the season) (Note: Barcelona has a buy-back options for 15M at the end of the first season, 17.5M at the second, and 20M at the third.) | 13 July 2022 | End of season | |
| 14 | MF | (Spain) Nico González | Valencia | None | 13 August 2022 | End of season | |
| — | MF | (Spain) Álex Collado | Elche | None | 15 August 2022 | End of season | |
| 23 | DF | (France) Samuel Umtiti | (Italy) Lecce | None | 25 August 2022 | End of season | |
| 2 | DF | (United States) Sergiño Dest | (Italy) Milan | None (Note: Milan has an option to buy the player for €20,000,000 at the end of the season.) | 1 September 2022 | End of season | |
| 33 | FW | (Morocco) Abde Ezzalzouli | Osasuna | None | 1 September 2022 | End of season | |
| Total | | | | | | €3,000,000 | |

=== Transfer summary ===
Undisclosed fees are not included in the transfer totals.

Expenditure ▼

Summer: €158,000,000

Winter: €00,000,000

Total expenditure: €158,000,000

Income ▲

Summer: €43,000,000

Winter: €4,000,000

Total income: €47,000,000

Net totals

Summer: ▼€115,000,000

Winter: ▲€4,000,000

Total: ▼€111,000,000

== Pre-season and friendlies ==
Win Draw Loss Fixtures

| 13 July 2022 Friendly | Olot | 1–1 | Barcelona | Olot, Spain |
| 19:00 CEST (UTC+2) | Eloi 45' (pen.) | Report | Aubameyang 28' | Stadium: Estadi Municipal d'Olot; Attendance: 3,300; Referee: Marc Oltra Sáez (Spain) |

| 19 July 2022 Friendly | Inter Miami | 0–6 | Barcelona | Fort Lauderdale, United States |
| 19:30 UTC−4 (EDT) | | Report | Aubameyang 19'; Raphinha 25'; Fati 41'; Gavi 55'; Depay 69'; Dembélé 70' | Stadium: DRV PNK Stadium; Attendance: 19,113; Referee: Rubiel Vazquez (United States) |

| 23 July 2022 Soccer Champions Tour | Real Madrid | 0–1 | Barcelona | Paradise, United States |
| 20:00 UTC−7 (PDT) | Vázquez (yellow card) 65' | Report | Raphinha 27'; Christensen (yellow card) 34'; Alba (yellow card) 43'; Busquets (yellow card) 54'; Kessié (yellow card) 74' | Stadium: Allegiant Stadium; Attendance: 61,299; Referee: Mark Allatin (United States) |

| 26 July 2022 Soccer Champions Tour | Barcelona | 2–2 | Juventus | Dallas, United States |
| 19:30 UTC−5 (CT) | Dembélé 34', 40'; Collado (yellow card) 78' | Report | Kean 39', 51'; Di María (yellow card) 74'; Barbieri (yellow card) 85' | Stadium: Cotton Bowl; Attendance: 58,127; Referee: Elton Garcia (United States) |

| 30 July 2022 Friendly | New York Red Bulls | 0–2 | Barcelona | Harrison, United States |
| 19:00 UTC−4 (EDT) | Cásseres Jr. (yellow card) 38'; Mullings (yellow card) 62'; Edelman (red card) 82' | Report | Araújo (yellow card) 28'; Dembélé 40'; Piqué (yellow card) 59'; Depay 87' | Stadium: Red Bull Arena; Attendance: 25,252; Referee: Ernie Constantine (United States) |

| 7 August 2022 Joan Gamper Trophy | Barcelona | 6–0 | UNAM | Barcelona, Spain |
| 20:00 CEST (UTC+2) | Lewandowski 3'; Pedri 5', 19'; Dembélé 10'; Gavi (yellow card) 21'; Aubameyang 49'; F. de Jong 84' | Report | | Stadium: Camp Nou; Attendance: 83,021; Referee: José María Sánchez Martínez (Spain) |

| 24 August 2022 ALS Charity Friendly | Barcelona | 3–3 | Manchester City | Barcelona, Spain |
| 21:30 CEST (UTC+2) | Aubameyang 29'; F. de Jong 66'; Depay 79' | Report | Álvarez 21'; Palmer 70', (yellow card) 74'; Mahrez 90+9' (pen.) | Stadium: Camp Nou; Attendance: 91,062; Referee: José María Sánchez Martínez (Spain) |

| 6 June 2023 Friendly | Vissel Kobe | 0–2 | Barcelona | Tokyo, Japan |
| 19:30 JST (UTC+9) | | Report | Kessié 16'; García 19' | Stadium: Japan National Stadium; Attendance: 47,335; Referee: Jumpei Iida (Japan) |

== Competitions ==
=== Overall record ===
| Competition | First match | Last match | Starting round | Final position | Record | | | | | | | |
| Competition | First match | Last match | Starting round | Final position | Pld | W | D | L | GF | GA | GD | Win % |
|---|---|---|---|---|---|---|---|---|---|---|---|---|
| La Liga | 13 August 2022 | 4 June 2023 | Matchday 1 | Winners | 38 | 28 | 4 | 6 | 70 | 20 | +50 | 73.68 |
| Copa del Rey | 4 January 2023 | 5 April 2023 | Round of 32 | Semi-finals | 5 | 4 | 0 | 1 | 11 | 7 | +4 | 80.00 |
| Supercopa de España | 12 January 2023 | 15 January 2023 | Semi-finals | Winners | 2 | 1 | 1 | 0 | 5 | 3 | +2 | 50.00 |
| UEFA Champions League | 7 September 2022 | 1 November 2022 | Group stage | Group stage | 6 | 2 | 1 | 3 | 12 | 12 | +0 | 33.33 |
| UEFA Europa League | 16 February 2023 | 23 February 2023 | Knockout round play-offs | Knockout round play-offs | 2 | 0 | 1 | 1 | 3 | 4 | −1 | 0.00 |
| Total | | | | | 53 | 35 | 7 | 11 | 101 | 46 | +55 | 66.04 |

Source: Soccerway

=== La Liga ===
==== League table ====
| Pos | Team | Pld | W | D | L | GF | GA | GD | Pts | Qualification or relegation |
|---|---|---|---|---|---|---|---|---|---|---|
| 1 | Barcelona (C) | 38 | 28 | 4 | 6 | 70 | 20 | +50 | 88 | Qualification for the Champions League group stage |
| 2 | Real Madrid | 38 | 24 | 6 | 8 | 75 | 36 | +39 | 78 | Qualification for the Champions League group stage |
| 3 | Atlético Madrid | 38 | 23 | 8 | 7 | 70 | 33 | +37 | 77 | Qualification for the Champions League group stage |
| 4 | Real Sociedad | 38 | 21 | 8 | 9 | 51 | 35 | +16 | 71 | Qualification for the Champions League group stage |
| 5 | Villarreal | 38 | 19 | 7 | 12 | 59 | 40 | +19 | 64 | Qualification for the Europa League group stage |

Source: LaLiga Santander
Rules for classification: 1) Points; 2) Head-to-head points; 3) Head-to-head goal difference; 4) Goal difference; 5) Goals scored; 6) Fair-play points (Note: Head-to-head record is used only after all the matches between the teams in question have been played)
(C) Champions

==== Results summary ====
| Overall | | | | | | | | Home | | | | | | Away | | | | | |
| Pld | W | D | L | GF | GA | GD | Pts | W | D | L | GF | GA | GD | W | D | L | GF | GA | GD |
|---|---|---|---|---|---|---|---|---|---|---|---|---|---|---|---|---|---|---|---|
| 38 | 28 | 4 | 6 | 70 | 20 | +50 | 88 | 15 | 3 | 1 | 37 | 4 | +33 | 13 | 1 | 5 | 33 | 16 | +17 |

Source: La Liga

==== Results by round ====
| Round | 1 | 2 | 3 | 4 | 5 | 6 | 7 | 8 | 9 | 10 | 11 | 12 | 13 | 14 | 15 | 16 | 17 | 18 | 19 | 20 | 21 | 22 | 23 | 24 | 25 | 26 | 27 | 28 | 29 | 30 | 31 | 32 | 33 | 34 | 35 | 36 | 37 | 38 |
|---|---|---|---|---|---|---|---|---|---|---|---|---|---|---|---|---|---|---|---|---|---|---|---|---|---|---|---|---|---|---|---|---|---|---|---|---|---|---|
| Ground | H | A | H | A | A | H | A | H | A | H | H | A | H | A | H | A | A | H | A | H | A | H | A | H | A | H | A | H | A | H | A | H | H | A | H | A | H | A |
| Result | D | W | W | W | W | W | W | W | L | W | W | W | W | W | D | W | W | W | W | W | W | W | L | W | W | W | W | D | D | W | L | W | W | W | L | L | W | L |
| Position | 11 | 5 | 3 | 2 | 2 | 2 | 1 | 1 | 2 | 2 | 2 | 2 | 1 | 1 | 1 | 1 | 1 | 1 | 1 | 1 | 1 | 1 | 1 | 1 | 1 | 1 | 1 | 1 | 1 | 1 | 1 | 1 | 1 | 1 | 1 | 1 | 1 | 1 |

Source: La Liga
A = Away; H = Home; W = Win; D = Draw; L = Loss; P = Postponed

==== Matches ====
The league fixtures were announced on 23 June 2022.

| 13 August 2022 1 | Barcelona | 0–0 | Rayo Vallecano | Barcelona |
| 21:00 CEST (UTC+2) | Dembélé (yellow card) 14'; Busquets (yellow card) 74' (yellow-red card) 90+3' | Report | Trejo (yellow card) 45'; Catena (yellow card) 45+5'; Lejeune (yellow card) 54'; Falcao (yellow card) 69'; Ciss (yellow card) 86'; Dimitrievski (yellow card) 89' | Stadium: Camp Nou; Attendance: 81,104; Referee: Alejandro Hernández Hernández |

| 21 August 2022 2 | Real Sociedad | 1–4 | Barcelona | San Sebastián |
| 22:00 CEST (UTC+2) | Isak 6'; Elustondo (yellow card) 21'; Le Normand (yellow card) 41' | Report | Lewandowski 1', 68'; Araújo (yellow card) 51'; Dembélé 66'; Fati 79' | Stadium: Anoeta; Attendance: 36,201; Referee: José Luis Munuera Montero |

| 28 August 2022 3 | Barcelona | 4–0 | Valladolid | Barcelona |
| 19:30 CEST (UTC+2) | Lewandowski 24', 65'; Pedri 43'; Roberto 90+2' | Report | Monchu (yellow card) 45'; J. Sánchez (yellow card) 78'; Kike (yellow card) 79' | Stadium: Camp Nou; Attendance: 83,972; Referee: Ricardo de Burgos Bengoetxea |

| 3 September 2022 4 | Sevilla | 0–3 | Barcelona | Seville |
| 21:00 CEST (UTC+2) | Jordán (yellow card) 33'; Carmona (yellow card) 66' | Report | Dembélé (yellow card) 9'; Raphinha 21'; Balde (yellow card) 28'; Lewandowski 36'; García 50'; Araújo (yellow card) 75'; Roberto (yellow card) 89' | Stadium: Ramón Sánchez Pizjuán; Attendance: 40,233; Referee: Antonio Mateu Lahoz |

| 10 September 2022 5 | Cádiz | 0–4 | Barcelona | Cádiz |
| 18:30 CEST (UTC+2) | Pérez (yellow card) 56' | Report | Raphinha (yellow card) 16'; Busquets (yellow card) 53'; De Jong 55'; Lewandowski 65'; Fati 86'; Dembélé 90+2' | Stadium: Nuevo Mirandilla; Attendance: 19,530; Referee: Carlos del Cerro Grande |

| 17 September 2022 6 | Barcelona | 3–0 | Elche | Barcelona |
| 16:15 CEST (UTC+2) | Kessié (yellow card) 5'; Lewandowski 34', 48'; Depay 41'; Torres (yellow card) 73' | Report | Verdú (red card) 14'; Bigas (yellow card) 29'; N. Fernández (yellow card) 70' | Stadium: Camp Nou; Attendance: 85,073; Referee: Alejandro Muñiz Ruiz |

| 1 October 2022 7 | Mallorca | 0–1 | Barcelona | Palma |
| 21:00 CEST (UTC+2) | Costa (yellow card) 42'; Valjent (yellow card) 83' | Report | Lewandowski 20'; Christensen (yellow card) 39'; Piqué (yellow card) 40'; Kessié (yellow card) 45'; Busquets (yellow card) 75' | Stadium: Visit Mallorca Estadi; Attendance: 18,103; Referee: Jesús Gil Manzano |

| 9 October 2022 8 | Barcelona | 1–0 | Celta Vigo | Barcelona |
| 21:00 CEST (UTC+2) | Pedri 17'; Alba (yellow card) 71'; Busquets (yellow card) 85' | Report | Núñez (yellow card) 61'; Aidoo (yellow card) 70'; Óscar (yellow card) 71' | Stadium: Camp Nou; Attendance: 81,525; Referee: José Luis Munuera Montero |

| 16 October 2022 9 | Real Madrid | 3–1 | Barcelona | Madrid |
| 16:15 CEST (UTC+2) | Benzema 12'; Vinícius (yellow card) 30'; Valverde 35'; Modrić (yellow card) 75'; Rodrygo 90+1' (pen.) | Report | Gavi (yellow card) 81'; Torres 83'; Kessié (yellow card) 90+2' | Stadium: Santiago Bernabéu; Attendance: 62,876; Referee: José María Sánchez Martínez |

| 20 October 2022 10 | Barcelona | 3–0 | Villarreal | Barcelona |
| 21:00 CEST (UTC+2) | Lewandowski 31', 35'; Fati 38' | Report | Torres (yellow card) 90+2' | Stadium: Camp Nou; Attendance: 73,261; Referee: Carlos del Cerro Grande |

| 23 October 2022 11 | Barcelona | 4–0 | Athletic Bilbao | Barcelona |
| 21:00 CEST (UTC+2) | Dembélé 12'; Roberto 18'; Lewandowski 22'; Busquets (yellow card) 71'; Torres 73'; García (yellow card) 78' | Report | De Marcos (yellow card) 16'; Vesga (yellow card) 89' | Stadium: Camp Nou; Attendance: 84,817; Referee: Juan Martínez Munuera |

| 29 October 2022 12 | Valencia | 0–1 | Barcelona | Valencia |
| 21:00 CEST (UTC+2) | Lino (yellow card) 67'; Guillamón (yellow card) 84'; Foulquier (yellow card) 90+7'; Castillejo (yellow card) 90+7' | Report | Alonso (yellow card) 21'; García (yellow card) 45'; Gavi (yellow card) 89'; Piqué (yellow card) 90+2'; Lewandowski 90+3'; Torres (yellow card) 90+7' | Stadium: Mestalla; Attendance: 46,007; Referee: Ricardo de Burgos Bengoetxea |

| 5 November 2022 13 | Barcelona | 2–0 | Almería | Barcelona |
| 21:00 CET (UTC+1) | Lewandowski (penalty missed) 7'; Torres (yellow card) 9'; Dembélé (yellow card) 42', (goal) 48'; De Jong 62' | Report | Kaiky (yellow card) 6' | Stadium: Camp Nou; Attendance: 92,605; Referee: Pablo González Fuertes |

| 8 November 2022 14 | Osasuna | 1–2 | Barcelona | Pamplona |
| 21:30 CET (UTC+1) | D. García 6', (yellow card) 46'; Cruz (yellow card) 45+3'; Torró (yellow card) 54'; Moncayola (yellow card) 61' | Report | Lewandowski (yellow card) 11' (yellow-red card) 31'; Alba (yellow card) 37'; Piqué (red card) 45+4'; Pedri 48'; Balde (yellow card) 66'; Raphinha 85' | Stadium: El Sadar; Attendance: 21,603; Referee: Jesús Gil Manzano |
Note: Piqué was sent off for dissent as an unused substitute.

| 31 December 2022 15 | Barcelona | 1–1 | Espanyol | Barcelona |
| 14:00 CET (UTC+1) | Alonso 7'; Fati (yellow card) 25'; Gavi (yellow card) 30'; Alba (yellow card) 74' (yellow-red card) 78'; Torres (yellow card) 75'; Pedri (yellow card) 76'; Raphinha (yellow card) 90+5' | Report | Oliván (yellow card) 30'; Cabrera (yellow card) 31'; Calero (yellow card) 55'; Joselu 73' (pen.); Vinícius (yellow card) 74' (yellow-red card) 80'; Expósito (yellow card) 74'; Puado (yellow card) 90+6' | Stadium: Camp Nou; Attendance: 88,095; Referee: Antonio Mateu Lahoz |

| 8 January 2023 16 | Atlético Madrid | 0–1 | Barcelona | Madrid |
| 21:00 CET (UTC+1) | Correa (yellow card) 79'; Molina (yellow card) 85'; Savić (red card) 90+2' | Report | Dembélé 22'; Araújo (yellow card) 56'; Christensen (yellow card) 82'; Raphinha (yellow card) 87'; Torres (red card) 90+2' | Stadium: Cívitas Metropolitano; Attendance: 63,493; Referee: José Luis Munuera Montero |

| 22 January 2023 18 | Barcelona | 1–0 | Getafe | Barcelona |
| 18:30 CET (UTC+1) | Pedri 35'; Dembélé (yellow card) 68' | Report | Alderete (yellow card) 44'; Ünal (yellow card) 82' | Stadium: Camp Nou; Attendance: 79,814; Referee: Javier Iglesias Villanueva |

| 28 January 2023 19 | Girona | 0–1 | Barcelona | Girona |
| 16:15 CET (UTC+1) | Castellanos (yellow card) 44'; Martínez (yellow card) 74' | Report | Fati (yellow card) 43'; Pedri (yellow card) 45+3', (goal) 61'; Gavi (yellow card) 49' | Stadium: Montilivi; Attendance: 13,402; Referee: Alejandro Muñiz Ruiz |

| 1 February 2023 17 | Real Betis | 1–2 | Barcelona | Seville |
| 21:00 CET (UTC+1) | Ruibal (yellow card) 66'; Guardado (yellow card) 67'; Luiz Felipe (yellow card) 69'; Koundé 85' (o.g.); Carvalho (red card) 90+5' | Report | Raphinha 65'; Lewandowski 80' | Stadium: Benito Villamarín; Attendance: 48,181; Referee: Ricardo de Burgos Bengoetxea |
Note: The match date was pushed back due to both teams' involvement in the Supercopa de España.

| 5 February 2023 20 | Barcelona | 3–0 | Sevilla | Barcelona |
| 21:00 CET (UTC+1) | Alba 58'; Gavi 70'; Raphinha 79' | Report | Rakitić (yellow card) 45+1'; Jordán (yellow card) 75' | Stadium: Camp Nou; Attendance: 77,987; Referee: José María Sánchez Martínez |

| 12 February 2023 21 | Villarreal | 0–1 | Barcelona | Villarreal |
| 21:00 CET (UTC+1) | Torres (yellow card) 38'; Baena (yellow card) 49'; Parejo (yellow card) 62'; Moreno (yellow card) 71' | Report | Pedri 18'; Araújo (yellow card) 43'; De Jong (yellow card) 56'; Koundé (yellow card) 58'; Raphinha (yellow card) 81' | Stadium: Estadio de la Cerámica; Attendance: 21,178; Referee: Alejandro Hernández Hernández |

| 19 February 2023 22 | Barcelona | 2–0 | Cádiz | Barcelona |
| 21:00 CET (UTC+1) | Roberto 43'; Lewandowski 45+1'; De Jong (yellow card) 66'; Kessié (yellow card) 78' | Report | Martí (yellow card) 24'; Alcaraz (yellow card) 53'; San Emeterio (yellow card) 82' | Stadium: Camp Nou; Attendance: 72,010; Referee: Pablo González Fuertes |

| 26 February 2023 23 | Almería | 1–0 | Barcelona | Almería |
| 18:30 CET (UTC+1) | Touré 24'; Robertone (yellow card) 47'; Chumi (yellow card) 53'; Fernando (yellow card) 87' | Report | García (yellow card) 35'; Raphinha (yellow card) 54'; Gavi (yellow card) 57' | Stadium: Power Horse Stadium; Attendance: 15,279; Referee: Miguel Ángel Ortiz Arias |

| 5 March 2023 24 | Barcelona | 1–0 | Valencia | Barcelona |
| 16:15 CET (UTC+1) | Raphinha 15'; Torres (penalty missed) 55'; Araújo (red card) 59' | Report | | Stadium: Camp Nou; Attendance: 89,644; Referee: Javier Alberola Rojas |

| 12 March 2023 25 | Athletic Bilbao | 0–1 | Barcelona | Bilbao |
| 21:00 CET (UTC+1) | I. Williams (yellow card) 30'; Zarraga (yellow card) 86' | Report | Raphinha 45+1'; Roberto (yellow card) 76' | Stadium: San Mamés; Attendance: 49,741; Referee: Jesús Gil Manzano |

| 19 March 2023 26 | Barcelona | 2–1 | Real Madrid | Barcelona |
| 21:00 CET (UTC+1) | Raphinha (yellow card) 33'; Roberto 45', (yellow card) 65'; Kessié 90+2'; Fati (yellow card) 90+6' | Report | Araújo 9' (o.g.); Nacho (yellow card) 18'; Modrić (yellow card) 69'; Ceballos (yellow card) 90+6' | Stadium: Camp Nou; Attendance: 95,745; Referee: Ricardo de Burgos Bengoetxea |

| 1 April 2023 27 | Elche | 0–4 | Barcelona | Elche |
| 21:00 CEST (UTC+2) | | Report | Lewandowski 20', 66', (yellow card) 87'; Fati 56'; Gavi (yellow card) 60'; Torres 70'; Araújo (yellow card) 74' | Stadium: Martínez Valero; Attendance: 28,142; Referee: Carlos del Cerro Grande |

| 10 April 2023 28 | Barcelona | 0–0 | Girona | Barcelona |
| 21:00 CEST (UTC+2) | | Report | Castellanos (yellow card) 32'; Stuani (yellow card) 77' | Stadium: Camp Nou; Attendance: 78,425; Referee: Antonio Mateu Lahoz |

| 16 April 2023 29 | Getafe | 0–0 | Barcelona | Getafe |
| 16:15 CEST (UTC+2) | Alderete (yellow card) 42'; Suárez (yellow card) 57' | Report | Gavi (yellow card) 2' | Stadium: Coliseum Alfonso Pérez; Attendance: 14,854; Referee: Juan Luis Pulido Santana |

| 23 April 2023 30 | Barcelona | 1–0 | Atlético Madrid | Barcelona |
| 16:15 CEST (UTC+2) | Alonso (yellow card) 28'; Torres 44'; Busquets (yellow card) 57'; Raphinha (yellow card) 78'; Gavi (yellow card) 90' | Report | Griezmann (yellow card) 75'; Savić (yellow card) 80'; Giménez (yellow card) 81'; Barrios (yellow card) 83'; Reguilón (yellow card) 84'; Morata (yellow card) 86'; Saúl (yellow card) 90+4' | Stadium: Camp Nou; Attendance: 80,965; Referee: José María Sánchez Martínez |

| 26 April 2023 31 | Rayo Vallecano | 2–1 | Barcelona | Madrid |
| 22:00 CEST (UTC+2) | Á. García 19'; F. García 53'; Dimitrievski (yellow card) 90+1' | Report | Balde (yellow card) 32'; Alba (yellow card) 34'; Gavi (yellow card) 36'; Raphinha (yellow card) 61'; Lewandowski 83' | Stadium: Vallecas; Attendance: 13,657; Referee: Jesús Gil Manzano |

| 29 April 2023 32 | Barcelona | 4–0 | Real Betis | Barcelona |
| 21:00 CEST (UTC+2) | Christensen 14'; Lewandowski 36'; Raphinha 39'; Rodríguez 82' (o.g.) | Report | González (yellow card) 24' (yellow-red card) 33' | Stadium: Camp Nou; Attendance: 88,530; Referee: Carlos del Cerro Grande |

| 2 May 2023 33 | Barcelona | 1–0 | Osasuna | Barcelona |
| 19:30 CEST (UTC+2) | Alba 85' | Report | Herrando (red card) 27' | Stadium: Camp Nou; Attendance: 76,061; Referee: Javier Iglesias Villanueva |

| 14 May 2023 34 | Espanyol | 2–4 | Barcelona | Barcelona |
| 21:00 CEST (UTC+2) | Darder (yellow card) 39'; Puado 73'; Joselu 90+2' | Report | Koundé (yellow card) 2', (goal) 53'; Lewandowski 11', 40'; Balde 20'; Gavi (yellow card) 39'; Alba (yellow card) 82' | Stadium: RCDE Stadium; Attendance: 27,360; Referee: Ricardo de Burgos Bengoetxea |

| 20 May 2023 35 | Barcelona | 1–2 | Real Sociedad | Barcelona |
| 21:00 CEST (UTC+2) | Lewandowski (yellow card) 53', (goal) 90'; Busquets (yellow card) 72'; Alonso (yellow card) 79'; De Jong (yellow card) 85' | Report | Merino 5'; Zubeldia (yellow card) 8'; Illarramendi (yellow card) 37'; Sørloth 72'; Kubo (yellow card) 79'; Fernández (yellow card) 85' | Stadium: Camp Nou; Attendance: 88,049; Referee: Javier Alberola Rojas |

| 23 May 2023 36 | Valladolid | 3–1 | Barcelona | Valladolid |
| 22:00 CEST (UTC+2) | Christensen 2' (o.g.); Larin 22' (pen.); Fresneda (yellow card) 27'; Plata 73' | Report | Raphinha (yellow card) 62'; Lewandowski 84' | Stadium: José Zorrilla; Attendance: 22,341; Referee: César Soto Grado |

| 28 May 2023 37 | Barcelona | 3–0 | Mallorca | Barcelona |
| 19:00 CEST (UTC+2) | Fati 1', 24'; Gavi 70' | Report | Ndiaye (red card) 14' | Stadium: Camp Nou; Attendance: 88,775; Referee: Jorge Figueroa Vázquez |

| 4 June 2023 38 | Celta Vigo | 2–1 | Barcelona | Vigo |
| 21:00 CEST (UTC+2) | Veiga 42', 65'; Cervi (yellow card) 81'; Tapia (yellow card) 90+6' | Report | Torres (yellow card) 55'; Raphinha (yellow card) 62'; Fati 79' | Stadium: Abanca-Balaídos; Attendance: 23,365; Referee: Juan Luis Pulido Santana |

=== Copa del Rey ===
| 4 January 2023 Round of 32 | Intercity | 3–4 (a.e.t.) | Barcelona | Alicante |
| 21:00 CET (UTC+1) | Soldevila 59', 74', 86' | Report | Araújo 4'; Torre (yellow card) 50'; Dembélé 66'; Raphinha 77'; Fati 103' | Stadium: Estadio José Rico Pérez; Attendance: 26,000; Referee: Valentín Pizarro Gómez |

| 19 January 2023 Round of 16 | Ceuta | 0–5 | Barcelona | Ceuta |
| 20:00 CET (UTC+1) | González (yellow card) 39' | Report | Raphinha 42'; Lewandowski 50', 90'; Fati 70'; Kessié 77' | Stadium: Estadio Alfonso Murube; Attendance: 7,000; Referee: Juan Martínez Munuera |

| 25 January 2023 Quarter-finals | Barcelona | 1–0 | Real Sociedad | Barcelona |
| 21:00 CET (UTC+1) | Dembélé 52'; Busquets (yellow card) 56'; Pedri (yellow card) 59' | Report | Méndez (red card) 40'; Zubimendi (yellow card) 66' | Stadium: Camp Nou; Attendance: 59,610; Referee: Jesús Gil Manzano |

| 2 March 2023 Semi-finals; First leg | Real Madrid | 0–1 | Barcelona | Madrid |
| 21:00 CET (UTC+1) | Vinícius (yellow card) 24'; Nacho (yellow card) 55'; Valverde (yellow card) 73' | Report | Militão 26' (o.g.); Raphinha (yellow card) 45'; Gavi (yellow card) 51'; Kessié (yellow card) 66' | Stadium: Santiago Bernabéu; Attendance: 60,000; Referee: José Luis Munuera Montero |

| 5 April 2023 Semi-finals; Second leg | Barcelona | 0–4 (1–4 agg.) | Real Madrid | Barcelona |
| 21:00 CEST (UTC+2) | Roberto (yellow card) 10'; Gavi (yellow card) 26'; García (yellow card) 67'; Torres (yellow card) 76'; Araújo (yellow card) 84'; Balde (yellow card) 86'; Fati (yellow card) 90+2' | Report | Vinícius (yellow card) 26', (goal) 45+1'; Benzema 50', 58' (pen.), 80'; Carvajal (yellow card) 71'; Alaba (yellow card) 86'; Militão (yellow card) 88' | Stadium: Camp Nou; Attendance: 94,902; Referee: Juan Martínez Munuera |

=== Supercopa de España ===
| 12 January 2023 Semi-finals | Real Betis | 2–2 (a.e.t.) (2–4 p) | Barcelona | Riyadh, Saudi Arabia |
| 22:00 SAST (UTC+3) | Fekir (yellow card) 48', (goal) 77'; Luiz Henrique (yellow card) 68'; Rodríguez (yellow card) 79'; Miranda (yellow card) 92'; Loren 101'; Guardado (yellow card) 112' (yellow-red card) 118' | Report | Lewandowski 40'; Roberto (yellow card) 60'; Raphinha (yellow card) 73'; Fati 93' | Stadium: King Fahd International Stadium; Attendance: 38,629; Referee: Carlos del Cerro Grande |
| | Penalties |
| | Willian José (penalty scored); Loren (penalty scored); Juanmi (penalty missed); Carvalho (penalty missed) | | (penalty scored) Lewandowski; (penalty scored) Kessié; (penalty scored) Fati; (penalty scored) Pedri |

| 15 January 2023 Final | Real Madrid | 1–3 | Barcelona | Riyadh, Saudi Arabia |
| 22:00 SAST (UTC+3) | Mendy (yellow card) 32'; Valverde (yellow card) 82'; Benzema 90+3' | Report | Gavi 33'; Lewandowski 45'; Christensen (yellow card) 49'; Araújo (yellow card) 68'; Pedri 69' | Stadium: King Fahd International Stadium; Attendance: 57,340; Referee: Ricardo de Burgos Bengoetxea; Man of the Match: Gavi |

=== UEFA Champions League ===
==== Group stage ====
The draw for the group stage was held on 25 August 2022.

| Pos | Team | Pld | W | D | L | GF | GA | GD | Pts | Qualification | BAY | INT | BAR | PLZ |
|---|---|---|---|---|---|---|---|---|---|---|---|---|---|---|
| 1 | (Germany) Bayern Munich | 6 | 6 | 0 | 0 | 18 | 2 | +16 | 18 | Advance to knockout phase | — | 2–0 | 2–0 | 5–0 |
| 2 | (Italy) Inter Milan | 6 | 3 | 1 | 2 | 10 | 7 | +3 | 10 | Advance to knockout phase | 0–2 | — | 1–0 | 4–0 |
| 3 | (Spain) Barcelona | 6 | 2 | 1 | 3 | 12 | 12 | 0 | 7 | Transfer to Europa League | 0–3 | 3–3 | — | 5–1 |
| 4 | (Czech Republic) Viktoria Plzeň | 6 | 0 | 0 | 6 | 5 | 24 | −19 | 0 | | 2–4 | 0–2 | 2–4 | — |

Source: UEFA
Rules for classification: Group stage tiebreakers

| 7 September 2022 1 | Barcelona (Spain) | 5–1 | (Czech Republic) Viktoria Plzeň | Barcelona, Spain |
| 21:00 CEST (UTC+2) | Kessié 13'; Lewandowski 34', 45+3', 67'; Torres 71' | Report | Pernica (yellow card) 4'; Mosquera (yellow card) 27'; Sýkora 44'; Chorý (yellow card) 56'; Jemelka (yellow card) 62' | Stadium: Camp Nou; Attendance: 77,411; Referee: Lawrence Visser (Belgium) |

| 13 September 2022 2 | Bayern Munich (Germany) | 2–0 | (Spain) Barcelona | Munich, Germany |
| 21:00 CEST (UTC+2) | Sabitzer (yellow card) 19'; Hernandez 50'; Sané 54'; Kimmich (yellow card) 74' | Report | Busquets (yellow card) 48' | Stadium: Allianz Arena; Attendance: 75,000; Referee: Danny Makkelie (Netherlands) |

| 4 October 2022 3 | Inter Milan (Italy) | 1–0 | (Spain) Barcelona | Milan, Italy |
| 21:00 CEST (UTC+2) | Barella (yellow card) 23'; Çalhanoğlu 45+2', (yellow card) 70'; Martínez (yellow card) 76'; Bastoni (yellow card) 88'; Onana (yellow card) 90+6' | Report | Busquets (yellow card) 60'; Gavi (yellow card) 76' | Stadium: San Siro; Attendance: 71,368; Referee: Slavko Vinčić (Slovenia) |

| 12 October 2022 4 | Barcelona (Spain) | 3–3 | (Italy) Inter Milan | Barcelona, Spain |
| 21:00 CEST (UTC+2) | Dembélé 40', (yellow card) 78'; Roberto (yellow card) 72'; Lewandowski 82', 90+2' | Report | Barella 50'; Martínez (yellow card) 52', (goal) 63'; De Vrij (yellow card) 55'; Mkhitaryan (yellow card) 84'; Gosens 89' | Stadium: Camp Nou; Attendance: 92,302; Referee: Szymon Marciniak (Poland) |

| 26 October 2022 5 | Barcelona (Spain) | 0–3 | (Germany) Bayern Munich | Barcelona, Spain |
| 21:00 CEST (UTC+2) | Busquets (yellow card) 41' | Report | Mané 10'; Mazraoui (yellow card) 16'; Goretzka (yellow card) 23'; Choupo-Moting 31'; Upamecano (yellow card) 35'; Pavard 90+5' | Stadium: Camp Nou; Attendance: 84,016; Referee: Anthony Taylor (England) |

| 1 November 2022 6 | Viktoria Plzeň (Czech Republic) | 2–4 | (Spain) Barcelona | Plzeň, Czech Republic |
| 21:00 CET (UTC+1) | N'Diaye (yellow card) 47'; Chorý 51' (pen.), 63' | Report | Alonso 6'; Gavi (yellow card) 42'; Torres 44', 54', (yellow card) 90+3'; Torre (yellow card) 50', (goal) 75' | Stadium: Doosan Arena; Attendance: 11,258; Referee: Radu Petrescu (Romania) |

=== UEFA Europa League ===
==== Knockout phase ====
===== Knockout round play-offs =====
The draw for the knockout round play-offs was held on 7 November 2022.

| 16 February 2023 First leg | Barcelona (Spain) | 2–2 | (England) Manchester United | Barcelona, Spain |
| 18:45 CET (UTC+1) | Alba (yellow card) 30'; Alonso 50'; Gavi (yellow card) 73'; Raphinha 76' | Report | Varane (yellow card) 43'; Rashford 53'; Koundé 59' (o.g.); Casemiro (yellow card) 65'; Malacia (yellow card) 72' | Stadium: Camp Nou; Attendance: 90,225; Referee: Maurizio Mariani (Italy) |

| 23 February 2023 Second leg | Manchester United (England) | 2–1 (4–3 agg.) | (Spain) Barcelona | Manchester, England |
| 20:00 GMT (UTC±0) | Fred 47'; Fernandes (yellow card) 60'; Antony 73'; Garnacho (yellow card) 78'; Casemiro (yellow card) 86' | Report | Lewandowski 18' (pen.), (yellow card) 71'; Kessié (yellow card) 60'; Busquets (yellow card) 83' | Stadium: Old Trafford; Attendance: 73,021; Referee: Clément Turpin (France) |

== Statistics ==
=== Squad statistics ===
| No. | Pos | Nat | Player | Total | | La Liga | | Copa del Rey | | Supercopa de España | | UEFA Champions League | | UEFA Europa League | |
| No. | Pos | Nat | Player | Apps | Goals | Apps | Goals | Apps | Goals | Apps | Goals | Apps | Goals | Apps | Goals |
Goalkeepers
| 1 | GK | (Germany) GER | Marc-André ter Stegen | 50 | 0 | 38 | 0 | 3 | 0 | 2 | 0 | 5 | 0 | 2 | 0 |
| 13/26 | GK | (Spain) ESP | Iñaki Peña | 5 | 0 | 0+2 | 0 | 2 | 0 | 0 | 0 | 1 | 0 | 0 | 0 |
| 36 | GK | (Spain) ESP | Arnau Tenas | 0 | 0 | 0 | 0 | 0 | 0 | 0 | 0 | 0 | 0 | 0 | 0 |
Defenders
| 4 | DF | (Uruguay) URU | Ronald Araújo | 31 | 1 | 21+1 | 0 | 4 | 1 | 2 | 0 | 1 | 0 | 2 | 0 |
| 15 | DF | (Denmark) DEN | Andreas Christensen | 32 | 1 | 22+1 | 1 | 1+1 | 0 | 1+1 | 0 | 3 | 0 | 1+1 | 0 |
| 17 | DF | (Spain) ESP | Marcos Alonso | 37 | 3 | 11+13 | 1 | 3+2 | 0 | 0+1 | 0 | 5 | 1 | 1+1 | 1 |
| 18 | DF | (Spain) ESP | Jordi Alba | 30 | 2 | 14+10 | 2 | 2 | 0 | 1 | 0 | 2 | 0 | 1 | 0 |
| 23 | DF | (France) FRA | Jules Koundé | 40 | 1 | 28+1 | 1 | 4 | 0 | 2 | 0 | 3 | 0 | 2 | 0 |
| 24 | DF | (Spain) ESP | Eric García | 32 | 1 | 15+9 | 1 | 1+2 | 0 | 0+1 | 0 | 2+2 | 0 | 0 | 0 |
| 28 | DF | (Spain) ESP | Alejandro Balde | 44 | 1 | 30+3 | 1 | 3+1 | 0 | 1 | 0 | 1+3 | 0 | 1+1 | 0 |
| 35 | DF | (Morocco) MAR | Chadi Riad | 1 | 0 | 0+1 | 0 | 0 | 0 | 0 | 0 | 0 | 0 | 0 | 0 |
Midfielders
| 5 | MF | (Spain) ESP | Sergio Busquets | 42 | 0 | 28+2 | 0 | 4+1 | 0 | 1+1 | 0 | 4 | 0 | 1 | 0 |
| 6/30 (Note: Gavi worn number 6 in La Liga and Copa del Rey matches played from January 31 until March 25.) | MF | (Spain) ESP | Gavi | 49 | 3 | 30+6 | 2 | 3+2 | 0 | 2 | 1 | 4+1 | 0 | 1 | 0 |
| 8 | MF | (Spain) ESP | Pedri | 35 | 7 | 22+4 | 6 | 1 | 0 | 2 | 1 | 5 | 0 | 1 | 0 |
| 19 | MF | (Ivory Coast) CIV | Franck Kessié | 43 | 3 | 7+21 | 1 | 4+1 | 1 | 0+2 | 0 | 3+3 | 1 | 2 | 0 |
| 20 | MF | (Spain) ESP | Sergi Roberto | 33 | 4 | 15+8 | 4 | 2+1 | 0 | 1+1 | 0 | 3 | 0 | 1+1 | 0 |
| 21 | MF | (Netherlands) NED | Frenkie de Jong | 43 | 2 | 29+4 | 2 | 2 | 0 | 2 | 0 | 2+2 | 0 | 2 | 0 |
| 29 | MF | (Spain) ESP | Marc Casadó | 1 | 0 | 0 | 0 | 0 | 0 | 0 | 0 | 0+1 | 0 | 0 | 0 |
| 32 | MF | (Spain) ESP | Pablo Torre | 13 | 1 | 1+7 | 0 | 2 | 0 | 0 | 0 | 1+2 | 1 | 0 | 0 |
| 40 | MF | (Spain) ESP | Aleix Garrido | 1 | 0 | 0+1 | 0 | 0 | 0 | 0 | 0 | 0 | 0 | 0 | 0 |
Forwards
| 7 | FW | (France) FRA | Ousmane Dembélé | 35 | 8 | 16+9 | 5 | 2 | 2 | 2 | 0 | 5+1 | 1 | 0 | 0 |
| 9 | FW | (Poland) POL | Robert Lewandowski | 46 | 33 | 33+1 | 23 | 3 | 2 | 2 | 2 | 5 | 5 | 2 | 1 |
| 10 | FW | (Spain) ESP | Ansu Fati | 51 | 10 | 11+25 | 7 | 0+5 | 2 | 0+2 | 1 | 2+4 | 0 | 0+2 | 0 |
| 11 | FW | (Spain) ESP | Ferran Torres | 45 | 7 | 14+19 | 4 | 3+1 | 0 | 0+1 | 0 | 1+4 | 3 | 0+2 | 0 |
| 22 | FW | (Brazil) BRA | Raphinha | 50 | 10 | 25+11 | 7 | 3+2 | 2 | 1+1 | 0 | 4+1 | 0 | 2 | 1 |
| 38 | FW | (Spain) ESP | Ángel Alarcón | 5 | 0 | 0+4 | 0 | 0+1 | 0 | 0 | 0 | 0 | 0 | 0 | 0 |
| 41 | FW | (Spain) ESP | Lamine Yamal | 1 | 0 | 0+1 | 0 | 0 | 0 | 0 | 0 | 0 | 0 | 0 | 0 |
Players who left during the season but made an appearance
| 2 | DF | (Spain) ESP | Héctor Bellerín | 7 | 0 | 1+2 | 0 | 2 | 0 | 0 | 0 | 2 | 0 | 0 | 0 |
| 3 | DF | (Spain) ESP | Gerard Piqué | 10 | 0 | 4+2 | 0 | 0 | 0 | 0 | 0 | 2+2 | 0 | 0 | 0 |
| 14 | FW | (Netherlands) NED | Memphis Depay | 4 | 1 | 2 | 1 | 1 | 0 | 0 | 0 | 0+1 | 0 | 0 | 0 |
| 17 | FW | (Gabon) GAB | Pierre-Emerick Aubameyang | 1 | 0 | 0+1 | 0 | 0 | 0 | 0 | 0 | 0 | 0 | 0 | 0 |
| 34 | MF | (Spain) ESP | Álvaro Sanz | 1 | 0 | 0 | 0 | 0 | 0 | 0 | 0 | 0+1 | 0 | 0 | 0 |
Own goals (4)

=== Goalscorers ===
| Rank | No. | Pos. | Nat. | Player | La Liga | Copa del Rey | Supercopa de España | Champions League | Europa League | Total |
|---|---|---|---|---|---|---|---|---|---|---|
| 1 | 9 | FW | (Poland) | Robert Lewandowski | 23 | 2 | 2 | 5 | 1 | 33 |
| 2 | 22 | FW | (Brazil) | Raphinha | 7 | 2 | — | — | 1 | 10 |
| 2 | 10 | FW | (Spain) | Ansu Fati | 7 | 2 | 1 | — | — | 10 |
| 4 | 7 | FW | (France) | Ousmane Dembélé | 5 | 2 | — | 1 | — | 8 |
| 5 | 8 | MF | (Spain) | Pedri | 6 | — | 1 | — | — | 7 |
| 5 | 11 | FW | (Spain) | Ferran Torres | 4 | — | — | 3 | — | 7 |
| 7 | 20 | MF | (Spain) | Sergi Roberto | 4 | — | — | — | — | 4 |
| 8 | 6/30 | MF | (Spain) | Gavi | 2 | — | 1 | — | — | 3 |
| 8 | 17 | DF | (Spain) | Marcos Alonso | 1 | — | — | 1 | 1 | 3 |
| 8 | 19 | MF | (Ivory Coast) | Franck Kessié | 1 | 1 | — | 1 | — | 3 |
| 11 | 21 | MF | (Netherlands) | Frenkie de Jong | 2 | — | — | — | — | 2 |
| 11 | 18 | DF | (Spain) | Jordi Alba | 2 | — | — | — | — | 2 |
| 13 | 14 | FW | (Netherlands) | Memphis Depay | 1 | — | — | — | — | 1 |
| 13 | 24 | DF | (Spain) | Eric Garcia | 1 | — | — | — | — | 1 |
| 13 | 15 | DF | (Denmark) | Andreas Christensen | 1 | — | — | — | — | 1 |
| 13 | 28 | DF | (Spain) | Alejandro Balde | 1 | — | — | — | — | 1 |
| 13 | 23 | DF | (France) | Jules Koundé | 1 | — | — | — | — | 1 |
| 13 | 4 | DF | (Uruguay) | Ronald Araújo | — | 1 | — | — | — | 1 |
| 13 | 32 | MF | (Spain) | Pablo Torre | — | — | — | 1 | — | 1 |
| Own goals (from the opponents) | | | | | 1 | 1 | — | — | — | 2 |
| Totals | | | | | 70 | 11 | 5 | 12 | 3 | 101 |

=== Hat-tricks ===
| Player | Against | Result | Date | Competition | Ref |
|---|---|---|---|---|---|
| (Poland) Robert Lewandowski | (Czech Republic) Viktoria Plzeň | 5–1 (H) | 7 September 2022 | UEFA Champions League | |

(H) – Home; (A) – Away

=== Assists ===
| Rank | No. | Pos. | Nat. | Player | La Liga | Copa del Rey | Supercopa de España | Champions League | Europa League | Total |
|---|---|---|---|---|---|---|---|---|---|---|
| 1 | 22 | FW | (Brazil) | Raphinha | 7 | 2 | — | 2 | 1 | 12 |
| 2 | 7 | FW | (France) | Ousmane Dembélé | 7 | — | — | 2 | — | 9 |
| 3 | 9 | FW | (Poland) | Robert Lewandowski | 7 | — | 1 | — | — | 8 |
| 3 | 6/30 | MF | (Spain) | Gavi | 4 | 2 | 2 | — | — | 8 |
| 5 | 26 | DF | (Spain) | Alejandro Balde | 6 | — | — | — | — | 6 |
| 5 | 18 | DF | (Spain) | Jordi Alba | 3 | 2 | — | 1 | — | 6 |
| 5 | 23 | DF | (France) | Jules Koundé | 3 | 1 | — | 1 | 1 | 6 |
| 8 | 5 | MF | (Spain) | Sergio Busquets | 4 | — | — | — | — | 4 |
| 8 | 21 | MF | (Netherlands) | Frenkie de Jong | 4 | — | — | — | — | 4 |
| 8 | 10 | FW | (Spain) | Ansu Fati | 3 | — | — | 1 | — | 4 |
| 8 | 11 | FW | (Spain) | Ferran Torres | 3 | — | — | 1 | — | 4 |
| 12 | 19 | MF | (Ivory Coast) | Franck Kessié | 1 | 2 | — | — | — | 3 |
| 13 | 4 | DF | (Uruguay) | Ronald Araújo | 2 | — | — | — | — | 2 |
| 13 | 20 | MF | (Spain) | Sergi Roberto | 1 | — | — | 1 | — | 2 |
| 13 | 24 | DF | (Spain) | Eric García | — | 1 | — | 1 | — | 2 |
| 16 | 15 | DF | (Denmark) | Andreas Christensen | 1 | — | — | — | — | 1 |
| 16 | 8 | MF | (Spain) | Pedri | 1 | — | — | — | — | 1 |
| 16 | 32 | MF | (Spain) | Pablo Torre | — | 1 | — | — | — | 1 |
| Totals | | | | | 56 | 10 | 3 | 10 | 2 | 81 |

=== Cleansheets ===
| Rank | No. | Nat. | Player | La Liga | Copa del Rey | Supercopa de España | Champions League | Europa League | Total |
|---|---|---|---|---|---|---|---|---|---|
| 1 | 1 | (Germany) | Marc-André ter Stegen | 26 | 2 | 0 | 0 | 0 | 28 |
| 2 | 13 | (Spain) | Iñaki Peña | 0 | 1 | — | 0 | — | 1 |
| 3 | 36 | (Spain) | Arnau Tenas | — | — | — | — | — | — |
| Totals | | | | 26 | 3 | 0 | 0 | 0 | 29 |

=== Disciplinary record ===
| No. | Pos. | Nat. | Name | La Liga | | | Copa del Rey | | | Supercopa de España | | | Champions League | | | Europa League | | | Total | | |
| No. | Pos. | Nat. | Name | Yellow card | (yellow card) (yellow-red card) | Red card | Yellow card | (yellow card) (yellow-red card) | Red card | Yellow card | (yellow card) (yellow-red card) | Red card | Yellow card | (yellow card) (yellow-red card) | Red card | Yellow card | (yellow card) (yellow-red card) | Red card | Yellow card | (yellow card) (yellow-red card) | Red card |
|---|---|---|---|---|---|---|---|---|---|---|---|---|---|---|---|---|---|---|---|---|---|
| 6/30 | MF | (Spain) | Gavi | 10 | | | 2 | | | | | | 2 | | | 1 | | | 15 | | |
| 5 | MF | (Spain) | Sergio Busquets | 8 | 1 | | 1 | | | | | | 3 | | | 1 | | | 13 | 1 | |
| 22 | FW | (Brazil) | Raphinha | 9 | | | 1 | | | 1 | | | | | | | | | 11 | | |
| 4 | DF | (Uruguay) | Ronald Araújo | 5 | | 1 | 1 | | | 1 | | | | | | | | | 7 | | 1 |
| 11 | FW | (Spain) | Ferran Torres | 5 | | 1 | 1 | | | | | | 1 | | | | | | 7 | | 1 |
| 18 | DF | (Spain) | Jordi Alba | 6 | 1 | | | | | | | | | | | 1 | | | 7 | 1 | |
| 19 | MF | (Ivory Coast) | Franck Kessié | 4 | | | 1 | | | | | | | | | 1 | | | 6 | | |
| 20 | DF | (Spain) | Sergi Roberto | 3 | | | 1 | | | 1 | | | 1 | | | | | | 6 | | |
| 9 | FW | (Poland) | Robert Lewandowski | 4 | 1 | | | | | | | | | | | 1 | | | 5 | 1 | |
| 7 | FW | (France) | Ousmane Dembélé | 4 | | | | | | | | | 1 | | | | | | 5 | | |
| 28 | DF | (Spain) | Alejandro Balde | 4 | | | 1 | | | | | | | | | | | | 5 | | |
| 24 | DF | (Spain) | Eric García | 3 | | | 1 | | | | | | | | | | | | 4 | | |
| 10 | FW | (Spain) | Ansu Fati | 3 | | | 1 | | | | | | | | | | | | 4 | | |
| 15 | DF | (Denmark) | Andreas Christensen | 2 | | | | | | 1 | | | | | | | | | 3 | | |
| 8 | MF | (Spain) | Pedri | 2 | | | 1 | | | | | | | | | | | | 3 | | |
| 17 | DF | (Spain) | Marcos Alonso | 3 | | | | | | | | | | | | | | | 3 | | |
| 21 | MF | (Netherlands) | Frenkie de Jong | 3 | | | | | | | | | | | | | | | 3 | | |
| 3 | DF | (Spain) | Gerard Piqué | 2 | | 1 | | | | | | | | | | | | | 2 | | 1 |
| 23 | DF | (France) | Jules Koundé | 2 | | | | | | | | | | | | | | | 2 | | |
| 32 | MF | (Spain) | Pablo Torre | | | | 1 | | | | | | 1 | | | | | | 2 | | |
| Coach | | (Spain) | Xavi | 5 | | | 2 | | | | | | 1 | | | | | | 8 | | |
| Totals | | | | 87 | 3 | 3 | 15 | | | 4 | | | 10 | | | 5 | | | 121 | 3 | 3 |

Source: FCBarcelona.com
Ordered by (red card) , (second yellow card) and (yellow card)
(yellow card) = Number of bookings; (second yellow card) = Number of sending offs after a second yellow card; (red card) = Number of sending offs by a direct red card.

=== Injury record ===
| No. | Pos. | Nat. | Name | Type | Status | Source | Match | Inj. Date | Ret. Date |
|---|---|---|---|---|---|---|---|---|---|
| 19 | FW | (Spain) | Ferran Torres | Right foot cut | | FCB.com | in training | 11 July 2022 | 12 August 2022 |
| 23 | DF | (France) | Jules Koundé | Left hamstring injury | | FCB.com | vs Austria with France | 22 September 2022 | 13 October 2022 |
| 21 | MF | (Netherlands) | Frenkie de Jong | Left thigh injury | | FCB.com | vs Poland with Netherlands | 22 September 2022 | 8 October 2022 |
| 14 | FW | (Netherlands) | Memphis Depay | Left thigh injury | | FCB.com | vs Poland with Netherlands | 22 September 2022 | 20 November 2022 |
| 4 | DF | (Uruguay) | Ronald Araújo | Right thigh injury — surgery | | FCB.com | vs Iran with Uruguay | 23 September 2022 | 30 November 2022 |
| 2 | DF | (Spain) | Héctor Bellerín | Left soleus muscle | | FCB.com | in training | 27 September 2022 | 19 October 2022 |
| 15 | DF | (Denmark) | Andreas Christensen | Sprained ankle | | FCB.com | vs Inter Milan | 4 October 2022 | 3 November 2022 |
| 19 | MF | (Ivory Coast) | Franck Kessié | Adductor muscle injury | | FCB.com | in training | 5 October 2022 | 11 October 2022 |
| 20 | MF | (Spain) | Sergi Roberto | Dislocated left shoulder | | FCB.com | vs Athletic Bilbao | 23 October 2022 | 5 December 2022 |
| 24 | DF | (Spain) | Eric García | External obturator muscle strain | | FCB.com | vs Valencia | 29 October 2022 | 3 November 2022 |
| 23 | DF | (France) | Jules Koundé | Biceps femoris muscle strain | | FCB.com | vs Valencia | 29 October 2022 | 14 November 2022 |
| 19 | MF | (Ivory Coast) | Franck Kessié | Biceps femoris muscle strain | | FCB.com | vs Viktoria Plzeň | 1 November 2022 | 14 December 2022 |
| 7 | FW | (France) | Ousmane Dembélé | Rectus femoris strain — left thigh | | FCB.com | vs Girona | 28 January 2023 | 28 April 2023 |
| 5 | MF | (Spain) | Sergio Busquets | Sprained ankle — left ankle | | FCB.com | vs Sevilla | 5 February 2023 | 20 February 2023 |
| 8 | MF | (Spain) | Pedri | Rectus femoris muscle injury — right thigh | | FCB.com | vs Manchester United | 16 February 2023 | 22 April 2023 |
| 10 | FW | (Spain) | Ansu Fati | Bruised knee | | FCB.com | in training | 24 February 2023 | 1 March 2023 |
| 9 | FW | (Poland) | Robert Lewandowski | Hamstring strain | | FCB.com | vs Almería | 26 February 2023 | 11 March 2023 |
| 4 | DF | (Uruguay) | Ronald Araújo | Groin adductor muscle strain — left thigh | | FCB.com | vs Real Madrid | 19 March 2023 | 30 March 2023 |
| 21 | MF | (Netherlands) | Frenkie de Jong | Pulled hamstring — right thigh | | FCB.com | vs Real Madrid | 19 March 2023 | 22 April 2023 |
| 15 | DF | (Denmark) | Andreas Christensen | Calf injury — left calf | | FCB.com | vs Finland with Denmark | 23 March 2023 | 28 April 2023 |
| 20 | MF | (Spain) | Sergi Roberto | Biceps femoris muscle injury — left thigh | | FCB.com | vs Getafe | 16 April 2023 | 13 May 2023 |
| 28 | DF | (Spain) | Alejandro Balde | Partial tear of the external lateral ligament — right ankle | | FCB.com | vs Mallorca | 28 May 2023 | 29 July 2023 |

- Player is injured
- Player has recovered from injury
Source: FC Barcelona

== Milestones ==
=== Debuts ===
The following players made their competitive debuts for the first team during the campaign.

Legend

– Indicates youth academy debut.

| Date | No. | Pos. | Nat. | Player | Age | Final score | Opponent | Competition | Source |
|---|---|---|---|---|---|---|---|---|---|
| 13 August 2022 | 9 | FW | (Poland) | Robert Lewandowski | 33 | 0–0 (H) | Rayo Vallecano | La Liga | |
| 13 August 2022 | 15 | DF | (Denmark) | Andreas Christensen | 26 | 0–0 (H) | Rayo Vallecano | La Liga | |
| 13 August 2022 | 22 | FW | (Brazil) | Raphinha | 25 | 0–0 (H) | Rayo Vallecano | La Liga | |
| 13 August 2022 | 19 | MF | (Ivory Coast) | Franck Kessié | 25 | 0–0 (H) | Rayo Vallecano | La Liga | |
| 28 August 2022 | 23 | DF | (France) | Jules Koundé | 23 | 4–0 (H) | Valladolid | La Liga | |
| 7 September 2022 | 32 | MF | (Spain) | Pablo Torre | 19 | 5–1 (H) | Viktoria Plzeň | Champions League | |
| 10 September 2022 | 2 | DF | (Spain) | Héctor Bellerín | 27 | 0–4 (A) | Cádiz | La Liga | |
| 10 September 2022 | 17 | DF | (Spain) | Marcos Alonso | 31 | 0–4 (A) | Cádiz | La Liga | |
| 1 November 2022 | 26 | GK | (Spain) | Iñaki Peña | 23 | 2–4 (A) | Viktoria Plzeň | Champions League | |
| 1 November 2022 | 29 | MF | (Spain) | Marc Casadó | 19 | 2–4 (A) | Viktoria Plzeň | Champions League | |
| 8 November 2022 | 35 | DF | (Morocco) | Chadi Riad | 19 | 1–2 (A) | Osasuna | La Liga | |
| 19 January 2023 | 38 | FW | (Spain) | Ángel Alarcón | 18 | 0–5 (A) | Ceuta | Copa del Rey | |
| 1 April 2023 | 40 | MF | (Spain) | Aleix Garrido | 19 | 0–4 (A) | Elche | La Liga | |
| 29 April 2023 | 41 | FW | (Spain) | Lamine Yamal | 15 | 4–0 (H) | Real Betis | La Liga | |

(H) – Home; (A) – Away

=== Appearances ===
The following players made their 100th, 150th, 350th, 450th or 700th for Barcelona's first team during the campaign.

| Date | No. | Pos. | Nat. | Name | Age | Final score | Opponent | Competition | Source |
100th appearances
| 28 January 2023 | 8 | MF | (Spain) | Pedri | 20 | 0–1 (A) | Girona | La Liga | |
| 23 February 2023 | 4 | DF | (Uruguay) | Ronald Araújo | 23 | 2–1 (A) | Manchester United | Europa League | |
| 16 April 2023 | 10 | FW | (Spain) | Ansu Fati | 20 | 0–0 (A) | Getafe | La Liga | |
150th appearances
| 12 October 2022 | 21 | MF | (Netherlands) | Frenkie de Jong | 25 | 3–3 (H) | Inter Milan | Champions League | |
350th appearances
| 15 January 2023 | 1 | GK | (Germany) | Marc-André ter Stegen | 30 | 1–3 (A) | Real Madrid | Supercopa de España | |
450th appearances
| 16 February 2023 | 18 | DF | (Spain) | Jordi Alba | 33 | 2–2 (H) | Manchester United | Europa League | |
700th appearances
| 12 January 2023 | 5 | MF | (Spain) | Sergio Busquets | 34 | 2–2 (A) | Real Betis | Supercopa de España | |

(H) – Home; (A) – Away

=== First goals ===
The following players scored their first goals for Barcelona's first team during the campaign.

| Date | No. | Pos. | Nat. | Name | Age | Score | Final score | Opponent | Competition | Source |
|---|---|---|---|---|---|---|---|---|---|---|
| 21 August 2026 | 9 | FW | (Poland) | Robert Lewandowski | 34 | 0–1 (A) | 1–4 (A) | Real Sociedad | La Liga | |
| 3 September 2022 | 22 | FW | (Brazil) | Raphinha | 25 | 0–1 (A) | 0–3 (A) | Sevilla | La Liga | |
| 3 September 2022 | 24 | DF | (Spain) | Eric Garcia | 21 | 0–3 (A) | 0–3 (A) | Sevilla | La Liga | |
| 7 September 2022 | 19 | MF | (Ivory Coast) | Franck Kessié | 25 | 1–0 (H) | 5–1 (H) | Viktoria Plzeň | Champions League | |
| 1 November 2022 | 17 | DF | (Spain) | Marcos Alonso | 32 | 0–1 (A) | 2–4 (A) | Viktoria Plzeň | Champions League | |
| 1 November 2022 | 32 | MF | (Spain) | Pablo Torre | 20 | 2–4 (A) | 2–4 (A) | Viktoria Plzeň | Champions League | |
| 29 April 2023 | 15 | DF | (Denmark) | Andreas Christensen | 27 | 1–0 (H) | 4–0 (H) | Real Betis | La Liga | |
| 14 May 2023 | 28 | DF | (Spain) | Alejandro Balde | 19 | 0–2 (A) | 2–4 (A) | Espanyol | La Liga | |
| 14 May 2023 | 23 | DF | (France) | Jules Koundé | 24 | 0–4 (A) | 2–4 (A) | Espanyol | La Liga | |

(H) – Home; (A) – Away

== Awards ==
| Player | Position | Award | Ref. |
|---|---|---|---|
| (Poland) Robert Lewandowski | Forward | Gerd Müller Trophy (2021–22) (2nd award – record) | |
| (Spain) Gavi | Midfielder | Kopa Trophy (2021–22) (1st award – shared record) | |
| (Spain) Gavi | Midfielder | Golden Boy (2022) (1st award – shared record) | |
| (Poland) Robert Lewandowski | Forward | La Liga Player of the Month (October 2022) (1st award) | |
| (Poland) Robert Lewandowski | Forward | Golden Foot (2022) (1st award) | |
| (Spain) Gavi | Midfielder | Memorial Aldo Rovira Award (2021–22) (1st award) | |
| (Spain) Pedri | Midfielder | Barça Players Award (2021–22) (1st award) | |
| (Germany) Marc-André ter Stegen | Goalkeeper | La Liga Team of the Season (2022–23) (1st appearance) | |
| (Spain) Alejandro Balde | Defender | La Liga Team of the Season (2022–23) (1st appearance) | |
| (Poland) Robert Lewandowski | Forward | La Liga Team of the Season (2022–23) (1st appearance) | |
| (France) Jules Koundé | Defender | La Liga Team of the Season (2022–23) (2nd appearance) | |
| (Spain) Pedri | Midfielder | La Liga Team of the Season (2022–23) (2nd appearance) | |
| (Poland) Robert Lewandowski | Forward | Pichichi Trophy (2022–23) – 23 goals (1st award) | |
| (Germany) Marc-André ter Stegen | Goalkeeper | Zamora Trophy (2022–23) – 37 matches – 18 goals conceded (0.49) (1st award) | |
| (Germany) Marc-André ter Stegen | Goalkeeper | La Liga Player of the season (MVP) – (Most Valuable Player) (2022–23) (1st award) | |
