= Aleix Garrido =

Spanish footballer (born 2004)

Personal information
- Full name: Aleix Garrido Cañizares
- Date of birth: 22 February 2004 (age 22)
- Place of birth: Ripoll, Spain
- Height: 1.73 m (5 ft 8 in)
- Position: Midfielder

Team information
- Current team: Eibar
- Number: 30

Youth career
- Ripoll
- 2012–2023: Barcelona

Senior career*
Years	Team	Apps	(Gls)
2022–2025	Barcelona B	61	(5)
2023	Barcelona	1	(0)
2025–	Eibar	35	(0)

International career^{‡}
2021	Spain U18	3	(0)
2022–2023	Spain U19	9	(1)
- * Club domestic league appearances and goals as of 6 June 2026 ‡ National team caps and goals as of 02:54, 1 April 2024 (UTC)

Aleix Garrido Cañizares (born 22 February 2004) is a Spanish professional footballer who plays as a midfielder for SD Eibar.

== Club career ==
Born in Ripoll, Girona, Catalonia, Garrido joined the academy of Barcelona in 2012 from EF Ripoll. He made his debut for the reserve team on 9 January 2022, in the Primera Federación. He scored his team's only goal in a 2–1 loss on home soil to Betis Deportivo.

Garrido was called up to the Barcelona first team for the first time for a La Liga game against Elche, and went on to make his debut in the 4–0 win, coming on as a substitute for Ansu Fati. Following the game, manager Xavi praised his ability, describing him as technically gifted.

On 20 June 2025, Garrido signed a three-year contract with Segunda División side SD Eibar.

== International career ==
Garrido has represented Spain at youth international level.

== Career statistics ==
As of matches played 29 March 2025

Appearances and goals by club, season and competition
Club	Season	League			Copa del Rey		Other		Total	
Club	Season	Division	Apps	Goals	Apps	Goals	Apps	Goals	Apps	Goals
Barcelona B	2021–22	Primera División RFEF	6	1	–		0	0	6	1
Barcelona B	2022–23	Primera Federación	9	1	–		2 (Note: Appearances in Primera Federación play-offs)	0	11	1
Barcelona B	2023–24	Primera Federación	21	1	–		2	0	23	1
Barcelona B	2024–25	Primera Federación	18	1	–		–		18	1
Barcelona B	Total		54	4	0	0	4	0	58	4
Barcelona	2022–23	La Liga	1	0	0	0	–		1	0
Career total			55	4	0	0	4	0	59	4

== Honours ==
Barcelona

- La Liga: 2022–23
