= Óscar Hernández (footballer, born 1976) =

Spanish footballer (born 1976)

Personal information
- Full name: Óscar Hernández Creus
- Date of birth: 24 September 1976 (age 50)
- Place of birth: Terrassa, Spain
- Height: 1.78 m (5 ft 10 in)
- Position: Midfielder

Youth career
- –1995: Terrassa U19

Senior career*
Years	Team	Apps	(Gls)
1995–1997	Terrassa	3	(0)
1997–1999	Tàrrega		
1999–2000	Balaguer		
2000–2004	Mataró	133	(8)
2004–2007	Gavà	36	(0)
Total		172	(8)

Managerial career
- 2015–2019: Aspire Academy
- 2019–2021: Al Sadd (assistant)
- 2021–2024: Barcelona (assistant)
- 2026–: Netherlands (assistant)
- * Club domestic league appearances and goals

Óscar Hernández Creus (born 24 September 1976) is a Spanish professional football manager and former player who was most recently the assistant manager of La Liga club Barcelona. He is the older brother of Xavi.

== Family ==
Born in Terrassa, Barcelona, Catalonia, Óscar's father, Joaquim, was a former player for Sabadell in the first division. He is the elder brother of Xavi, who is also a former player and manager.

== Career ==
Hernández began his senior playing career at Terassa in 1995, making three appearances for the club. He then played for Tàrrega and Balaguer, and then transferred to Mataró, where he made 133 appearances and scored 8 goals. He transferred to Gavà in 2004 where he played until his retirement in 2007.

From 2015 to 2019, he was the manager of Aspire Academy in Qatar. He then began working as his brother's assistant at Al Sadd from 2019 to 2021 and then became assistant at Barcelona in 2021. In the absence of Xavi during his intermittent touchline suspensions, Óscar has managed a total of seven matches, all of which resulted in victories.

== Honours ==
=== Assistant manager ===
Al Sadd

- Qatar Stars League: 2020–21
- Qatar Cup: 2020, 2021
- Sheikh Jassim Cup: 2019
- Emir of Qatar Cup: 2020, 2021
- Qatari Stars Cup: 2019–20

Barcelona

- La Liga: 2022–23
- Supercopa de España: 2022–23
