= Ronald Araújo =

Uruguayan footballer (born 1999)

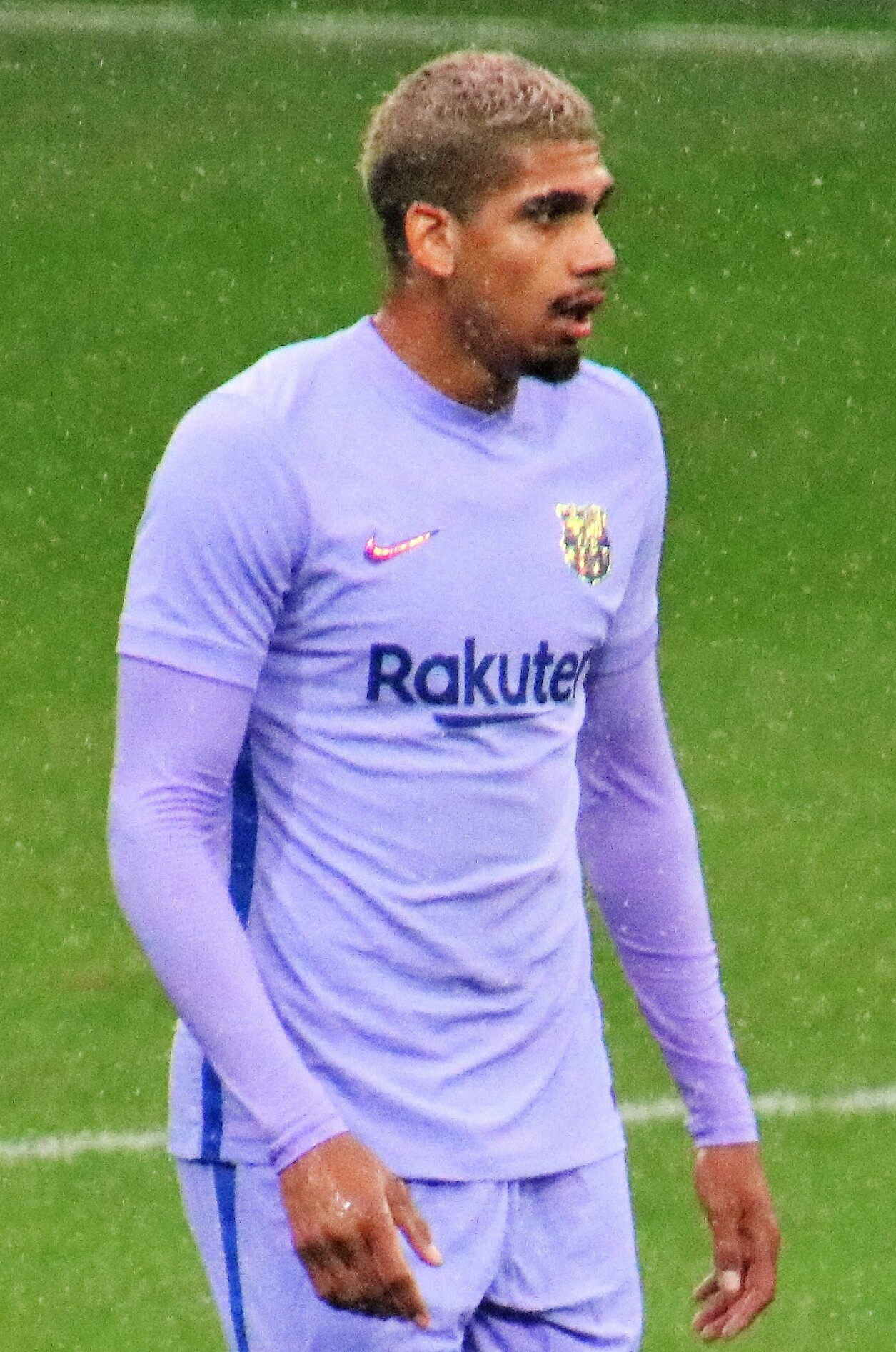
- Araújo playing for Barcelona in 2021

Personal information
- Full name: Ronald Federico Araújo da Silva
- Date of birth: 7 March 1999 (age 27)
- Place of birth: Rivera, Uruguay
- Height: 1.91 m (6 ft 3 in)
- Positions: Centre-back; right-back

Team information
- Current team: Liverpool (on loan from Barcelona)
- Number: 33

Youth career
- 2012–2015: Huracán de Rivera
- 2015–2016: Rentistas

Senior career*
Years	Team	Apps	(Gls)
2016–2017	Rentistas	17	(7)
2017–2018	Boston River	27	(0)
2018–2020	Barcelona B	42	(6)
2019–	Barcelona	143	(11)
2026–	→ Liverpool (loan)	11	(0)

International career^{‡}
2017–2018	Uruguay U18	6	(1)
2018–2019	Uruguay U20	12	(2)
2020–	Uruguay	31	(1)
Medal record
Men's football
Representing Uruguay
Copa América
Third place	2024 United States	Team
South American Games
Silver medal – second place	2018 Cochabamba	Team
- * Club domestic league appearances and goals as of 18:30, 22 November 2026 (UTC) ‡ National team caps and goals as of 23:50, 17 November 2026 (UTC)

Ronald Federico Araújo da Silva (Spanish pronunciation: [roˈnald aɾaˈuxo]; born 7 March 1999) is an Uruguayan professional footballer who plays as a centre-back for Premier League club Liverpool, on loan from La Liga club Barcelona, and the Uruguay national team.

== Early career ==
Ronald Federico Araújo da Silva was born on 7 March 1999 in Rivera, a city near the Brazilian border, to a Brazilian-Uruguayan father and a Brazilian mother.

== Club career ==
=== Rentistas ===
Araújo joined Rentistas from hometown club Huracán de Rivera. He made his senior debut with the former on 24 September 2016, coming on as a late substitute in a 1–0 Segunda División away win against Tacuarembó.

Araújo scored his first senior goal on 9 December 2016, netting the equaliser in a 2–2 home draw against Central Español. He became a regular starter during the 2017 season, and scored a hat-trick in a 3–2 away win over Villa Española on 17 June of that year.

It was at Rentistas that Araújo made the significant switch in position from forward to defender.

=== Boston River ===
On 28 July 2017, Araújo joined Primera División side Boston River. He made his debut in the category on 18 September, replacing Maximiliano Sigales late into a 1–0 home success over El Tanque Sisley.

=== Barcelona ===
On 29 August 2018, Araújo signed a five-year contract with La Liga club Barcelona for a fee of €1.7 million, plus €3.5 million in variables; he was initially assigned to the reserves in the Segunda División B. He made his first team – and La Liga – debut on 6 October of the following year, coming off the bench to replace Jean-Clair Todibo in the 73rd minute of a 4–0 home win against Sevilla; however, he was sent off in the 86th minute for fouling Javier Hernández.

For the 2020–21 season, Araújo was promoted to the main squad, being handed the number 4 jersey, which was previously worn by Ivan Rakitić. On 19 December 2020, he scored his first La Liga goal for Barcelona in a 2–2 home draw against Valencia.

On 20 March 2022, Araújo scored his first goal in the El Clásico, heading in a corner from Ousmane Dembélé in a 4–0 away victory against the league leaders at the Santiago Bernabéu.

For the first 21 league games of the 2022–23 season, Araújo formed a defensive partnership alongside Andreas Christensen and occasionally Jules Koundé at centre-back, helping Barcelona keep the most clean sheets (16) in all of Europe's top five leagues.

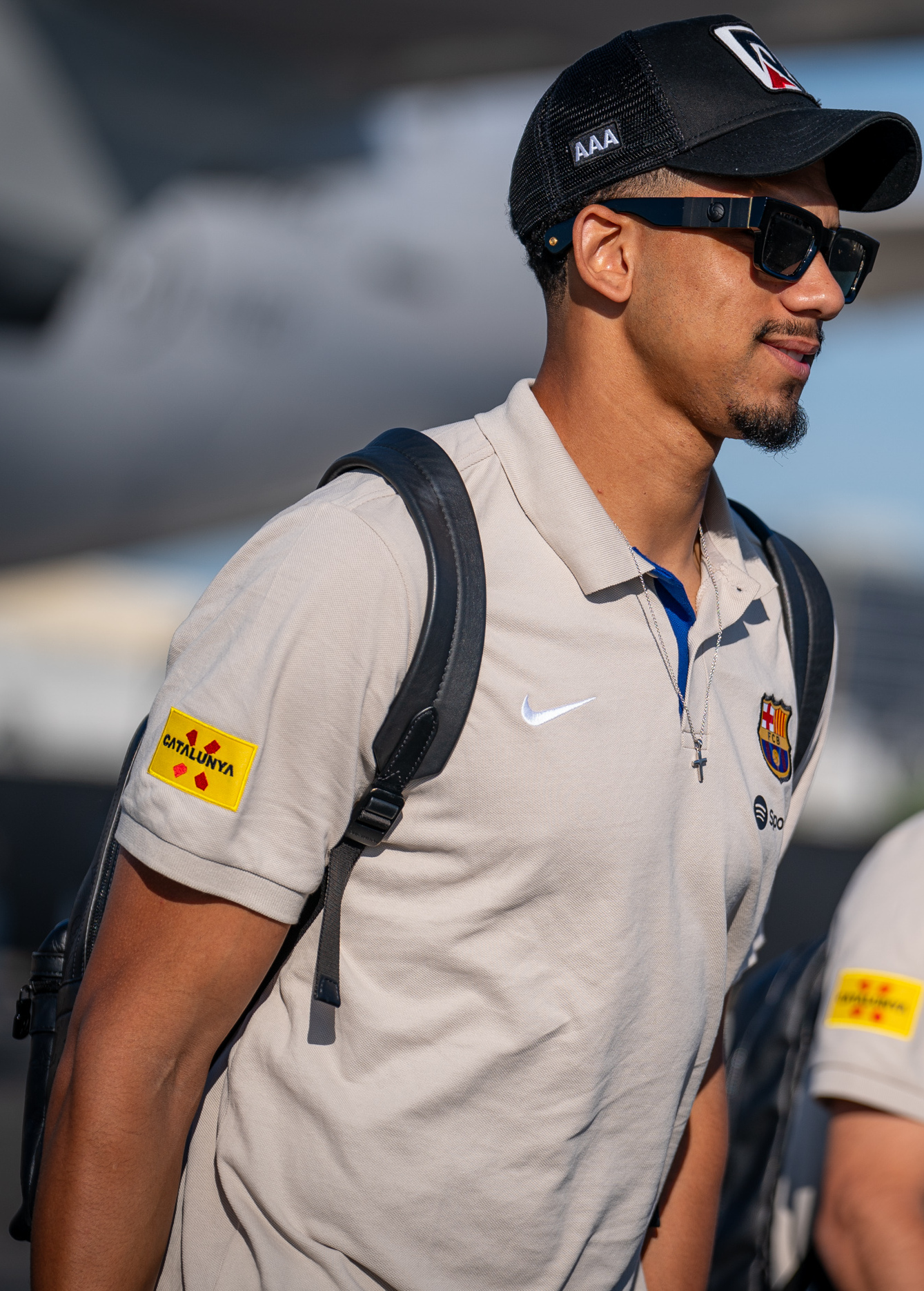
Araújo with Barcelona in 2023

On 21 July 2023, Barcelona announced Araújo as the club's third captain. On 4 November 2023, he scored his first goal of the 2023–24 season in the 92nd minute of stoppage time in a 1–0 away win over Real Sociedad.

On 16 April 2024, Araújo received a straight red card for fouling Bradley Barcola in the first-half of Barcelona's Champions League quarter-final second leg match against Paris Saint-Germain, which shifted the momentum in PSG's favour, turning the tide of the match, despite Barcelona's one goal lead; they eventually ended up losing 4–1 on the night, and 6–4 on aggregate. On 23 January 2025, he extended his contract with the club until 2031. Later that year, on 25 November, Araújo was heavily criticised after a UEFA Champions League away match against Chelsea, where he was sent off in the first half after receiving a second yellow card for a foul on Marc Cucurella. Barcelona went on to lose 3–0, with some pundits and journalists blaming his dismissal for disrupting the team's momentum. He subsequently took a mental health break following the criticism, during which he travelled to Tel Aviv. He returned to training approximately a month later.

In January 2026, Araújo was appointed club captain following the loan departure of Marc-André ter Stegen. On 3 March 2026, he made his 200th appearance for the club in a 3–0 win over Atlético Madrid in the second leg of the Copa del Rey semi-final, becoming the ninth South American player to reach this milestone for the club. Araújo lifted the 2025–26 La Liga trophy as his club secured their 29th league title.

==== Loan to Liverpool ====
On 10 August 2026, Araújo joined Premier League club Liverpool on a season-long loan deal with an option to buy. He made his debut for Liverpool in a 2–2 draw with Newcastle United at St James' Park on 23 August, in the club's first game of the 2026–27 Premier League season. On 14 October 2026, Araújo scored his first goal for Liverpool in a 6-3 win over LASK in the UEFA Champions League at Raiffeisen Arena.

== International career ==
After representing Uruguay at under-18 and under-20 levels, Araújo received his first call up for the senior side on 5 October 2020, for two 2022 FIFA World Cup qualifiers against Chile and Ecuador. He made his full international debut eight days later, starting in a 2–4 loss against the latter.

In June 2021, Araújo was included in the final 26-man Uruguay squad for the 2021 Copa América in Brazil, but he didn't feature in any of Uruguay's five games in the tournament while also suffering a muscle injury.

Despite nursing an injury, Araújo was included in the Uruguay squad for the 2022 FIFA World Cup, having expected a recovery during the knockout phase. However, he did not make an appearance as Uruguay were eliminated in the group stage.

On 16 November 2023, he scored his first goal with the national team against Argentina in the 2026 FIFA World Cup qualification fifth round at La Bombonera in Buenos Aires. In the 41st minute, Araújo received the ball after a Matías Viña's low cross into the penalty box and beat Argentine keeper Emiliano Martínez with a shot from the right side of the goal to the bottom left corner.

On 31 May 2026, Araújo was named in Uruguay's 26-man squad for the 2026 FIFA World Cup. However, he again did not feature in any matches at the tournament after suffering a calf muscle tear.

== Style of play ==
Originally a striker, Araújo's physicality made his youth coaches move him to centre-back at age 17. Primarily a right-footed centre-back, Araújo is also comfortable playing as a right-back, a role in which he has been deployed on occasion to counter skilled wingers. Known for his defensive solidity, Araújo excels in one-on-one duels and has an ability to time his challenges effectively. His pace and athleticism allow him to recover quickly and cover large spaces, making him an invaluable asset in high defensive lines.

Brazilian winger Vinícius Júnior has called him ''The best defender I have ever faced. He's very strong and very good''.

Standing at 1.91 meters, Araújo is dominant in the air, both defensively and offensively. His aerial prowess makes him a constant threat from set pieces, where his ability to outjump opponents has led to crucial goals for both club and country.

Despite his defensive strength, his ball-playing abilities have often been criticized. During the Champions League quarter-final, Luis Enrique stated that he ordered his men to press Araújo when he had the ball. Araújo's defensive decision-making has also been lacking as he sometimes lacks positional sense, and the sense of when to intercept and when to be proactive.

== Personal life ==
Araújo is a Christian.

In 2016, he began a relationship with Abigail Olivera, whom he married on 21 July 2025, at the Methodist Temple of Montevideo. Together, they are the parents of two daughters: Aitana (born 2021) and Adara (born 2024).

== Career statistics ==
=== Club ===
As of match played 22 November 2026

Appearances and goals by club, season and competition
Club	Season	League			National cup (Note: Includes Copa del Rey, FA Cup)		League cup (Note: Includes EFL Cup)		Continental		Other		Total	
Club	Season	Division	Apps	Goals	Apps	Goals	Apps	Goals	Apps	Goals	Apps	Goals	Apps	Goals
Rentistas	2016	Uruguayan Segunda División	3	1	—		—		—		—		3	1
Rentistas	2017	Uruguayan Segunda División	14	6	—		—		—		—		14	6
Rentistas	Total		17	7	—		—		—		—		17	7
Boston River	2017	Uruguayan Primera División	9	0	—		—		—		—		9	0
Boston River	2018	Uruguayan Primera División	18	0	—		—		4 (Note: Appearances in Copa Sudamericana)	0	—		22	0
Boston River	Total		27	0	—		—		4	0	—		31	0
Barcelona B	2018–19	Segunda División B	22	3	—		—		—		—		22	3
Barcelona B	2019–20	Segunda División B	20	3	—		—		—		2 (Note: Appearances in Segunda División B play-offs)	0	22	3
Barcelona B	Total		42	6	—		—		—		2	0	44	6
Barcelona	2019–20	La Liga	6	0	0	0	—		0	0	0	0	6	0
Barcelona	2020–21	La Liga	24	2	4	0	—		3 (Note: Appearances in UEFA Champions League)	0	2 (Note: Appearance(s) in Supercopa de España)	0	33	2
Barcelona	2021–22	La Liga	30	4	2	0	—		10 (Note: Five appearances in UEFA Champions League, five appearances in UEFA Europa League)	0	1	0	43	4
Barcelona	2022–23	La Liga	22	0	4	1	—		3 (Note: One appearance in UEFA Champions League, two appearances in UEFA Europa League)	0	2	0	31	1
Barcelona	2023–24	La Liga	25	1	2	0	—		8	0	2	0	37	1
Barcelona	2024–25	La Liga	12	1	4	0	—		8	1	1	0	25	2
Barcelona	2025–26	La Liga	24	3	3	1	—		10	0	1	0	38	4
Barcelona	Total		143	11	19	2	—		42	1	9	0	213	14
Liverpool (loan)	2026–27	Premier League	11	0	0	0	2	0	3	2	—		16	2
Career total			240	24	19	2	2	0	49	3	11	0	321	29

=== International ===
As of match played 17 November 2026

Appearances and goals by national team and year
National team	Year	Apps	Goals
Uruguay	2020	1	0
Uruguay	2021	4	0
Uruguay	2022	7	0
Uruguay	2023	4	1
Uruguay	2024	4	0
Uruguay	2025	5	0
Uruguay	2026	6	0
Total		31	1

As of match played 13 November 2026
Uruguay score listed first, score column indicates score after each Araújo goal.

List of international goals scored by Ronald Araújo
No.	Date	Venue	Cap	Opponent	Score	Result	Competition	Ref.
1	17 November 2023	La Bombonera, Buenos Aires, Argentina	15	Argentina	1–0	2–0	2026 FIFA World Cup qualification	

== Honours ==
Barcelona

- La Liga: 2022–23, 2024–25, 2025–26
- Copa del Rey: 2020–21, 2024–25
- Supercopa de España: 2023, 2025, 2026

Uruguay U20

- South American Games silver medal: 2018

Uruguay

- Copa América third place: 2024

Individual

- La Liga Team of the Season: 2021–22, 2023–24
- IFFHS Men's CONMEBOL Team: 2023
