= Pau Prim =

Spanish footballer, born 2006

Personal information
- Full name: Pau Prim Coma
- Date of birth: 22 February 2006 (age 20)
- Place of birth: Castellbisbal, Spain
- Height: 1.76 m (5 ft 9 in)
- Position: Midfielder

Team information
- Current team: Al Sadd

Youth career
- 2012–2024: Barcelona

Senior career*
Years	Team	Apps	(Gls)
2023–2025	Barcelona B	30	(0)
2025–	Al Sadd	7	(0)
2026	→ Al-Shamal (loan)	7	(1)
2026–2027	→ Qatar SC (loan)	9	(2)

International career^{‡}
2021–2022	Spain U16	9	(0)
2022–2023	Spain U17	20	(0)
2023–2024	Spain U18	4	(0)
2024–2025	Spain U19	7	(1)
2025–	Spain U21	1	(0)
- * Club domestic league appearances and goals as of 17 July 2026 ‡ National team caps and goals as of 22:08, 9 October 2025 (UTC)

Pau Prim Coma (born 22 February 2006) is a Spanish professional footballer who plays as a midfielder for Qatar Stars League club Qatar SC, on loan from Al-Sadd.

== Club career ==
=== Barcelona ===
Born in Castellbisbal, Barcelona, Catalonia, Prim started playing football at the age of 4 with his hometown club before signing for Barcelona in 2012. He was named captain in the youth squads for Barça and rose to the Juvenil A squad after starting on his debut against Viktoria Plzeň in the UEFA Youth League.

Despite having been recently promoted to the U19 side during the 2022–23 season, Prim was named as an unused substitute in Barça's 2–1 defeat to Celta on 4 June, and was one of six youth players to make their first team debut in a friendly match against Vissel Kobe just two days later. In addition to his debut, Prim made his Barcelona B debut on 27 August 2023 in a 1–0 defeat to SD Logroñés in their opening match of the 2023–24 Primera Federación.

=== Al Sadd ===
On 1 July 2025, Prim joined Qatar Stars League club Al Sadd SC. He signed a contract with the club until 2029.

== International career ==
A youth international for Spain, Prim was named in the Spain U17 squad for the 2023 UEFA European Under-17 Championship in Hungary, and later that year was included in the squad for the 2023 FIFA U-17 World Cup in Indonesia. He also played for the under-19 team.

In August 2023, Prim was left out of the Spain U18 selection due to first team commitments under Xavi.

== Style of play ==
Integrated into the philosophy of Barcelona, Prim was labelled as the next successor to former Barça veteran Sergio Busquets. Good with both feet, Prim is noted to be very exceptional in his passing ability and agility. In defence, he is described to be able to read the play very quickly, allowing him to stop any progress from the opponent's attack and start a counterattack for his side.

== Career statistics ==
As of match played 1 May 2026

Appearances and goals by club, season and competition
Club	Season	League			Cup		Continental		Other		Total	
Club	Season	Division	Apps	Goals	Apps	Goals	Apps	Goals	Apps	Goals	Apps	Goals
Barcelona B	2023–24	Primera Federación	14	0	—		—		0	0	14	0
Barcelona B	2024–25	Primera Federación	16	0	—		—		0	0	16	0
Barcelona B	Total		30	0	0	0	0	0	0	0	30	0
Al Sadd	2025–26	Qatar Stars League	7	0	0	0	1 (Note: Appearances in AFC Champions League Elite)	0	0	0	8	0
Al-Shamal SC (loan)	2025–26	Qatar Stars League	7	1	3	0	1	0	0	0	11	1
Qatar SC (loan)	2026–27	Qatar Stars League	9	2	1	0	0	0	0	0	10	2
Career Total			53	3	4	0	2	0	0	0	59	3
