= Ansu Fati =

Spanish footballer (born 2002)

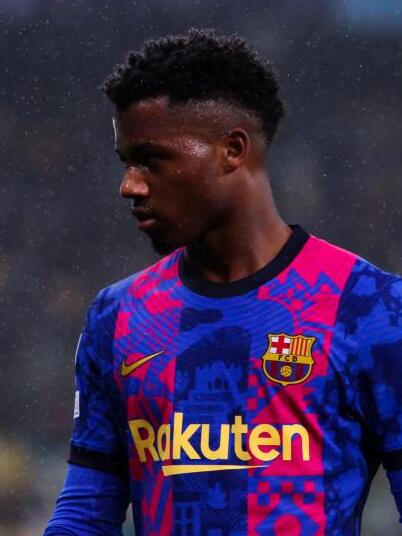
- Fati with Barcelona in 2022

Personal information
- Full name: Anssumane Fati Vieira
- Date of birth: 31 October 2002 (age 24)
- Place of birth: Bissau, Guinea-Bissau
- Height: 1.78 m (5 ft 10 in)
- Positions: Left winger; forward

Team information
- Current team: Monaco
- Number: 31

Youth career
- Escuela Peloteros Sierra Sur
- Sevilla
- 2011–2019: Barcelona

Senior career*
Years	Team	Apps	(Gls)
2019–2026	Barcelona	86	(22)
2023–2024	→ Brighton & Hove Albion (loan)	19	(2)
2025–2026	→ Monaco (loan)	25	(11)
2026–	Monaco	2	(0)

International career^{‡}
2019–2020	Spain U21	2	(0)
2020–2023	Spain	10	(2)
Medal record
Men's football
Representing Spain
UEFA Nations League
Winner	2023 Netherlands
- * Club domestic league appearances and goals as of 19:14, 18 October 2026 (UTC) ‡ National team caps and goals as of 18 June 2023 (UTC)

Anssumane "Ansu" Fati Vieira (born 31 October 2002) is a professional footballer who plays as a left winger or forward for Ligue 1 club Monaco. Born in Guinea-Bissau, he played for the Spain national team.

Fati joined Barcelona's La Masia at the age of ten and rose rapidly through the ranks, becoming one of the club's youngest-ever debutants and goalscorers in 2019. After an early breakthrough at senior level, his progress was disrupted by a series of injuries. He later had loan spells at Premier League club Brighton & Hove Albion and Ligue 1 side Monaco, he later made his move permanent in 2026. He also represented Spain at international level, and won the UEFA Nations League with the side in 2023.

== Early life ==
Fati was born on 31 October 2002 in Bissau, Guinea-Bissau. He moved to Seville with his family at the age of five, when his older brother Braima signed for Sevilla. His other brother, Miguel Fati, is also a footballer, as is his older cousin, Ença Fati. Fati is an ethnic Manjak.

== Club career ==
=== Barcelona ===
==== Early career ====
After representing local side Herrera and the youth teams of Sevilla, he joined Barcelona's La Masia in 2012, aged ten, a year after his brother had made the same move.

==== 2019–20 season ====
On 24 July 2019, Fati signed his first professional contract with Barcelona, agreeing to a deal until 2022. On 25 August, before even appearing with the reserves, Fati made his first team and La Liga debut. He came on as a late-game substitute for goalscorer Carles Pérez in a 5–2 home win over Real Betis. Aged 16 years and 298 days, he became the second-youngest player to debut for the club, only 18 days older than Vicenç Martínez in 1941.

On 31 August 2019, he scored his first professional goal in a 2–2 away draw between Barcelona and Osasuna at the age of 16 years and 304 days, becoming the Barcelona senior team's youngest goalscorer ever and the third-youngest scorer in the history of La Liga.

On 14 September 2019, in his first career start, Fati became the youngest player in the history of La Liga to score and assist in the same match, at the age of 16 years and 318 days. Fati scored a goal in the second minute which was assisted by Frenkie de Jong, and later assisted de Jong's goal in the seventh minute of an eventual 5–2 home win against Valencia.

On 17 September, Fati made his Champions League debut in a 0–0 away draw against Borussia Dortmund, becoming the youngest player to feature for Barcelona in the competition at the age of 16 years and 321 days, breaking the previous record held by Bojan Krkić (17 years and 22 days); he also became the third-youngest player ever to appear in the competition. On 10 December, Fati became the youngest goalscorer in UEFA Champions League history at the age of 17 years and 40 days when he scored the game winner in Barcelona's 2–1 victory over Inter Milan at the San Siro.

On 2 February 2020, Fati became the youngest player to score a brace in La Liga, scoring both goals in Barcelona's 2–1 win over Levante. On 5 July, Barcelona defeated Villarreal away from home and he scored the fourth goal in the 4–1 win. His goal was the 9,000th in Barça's history. On 9 July 2020, Fati was sent off after fouling Fernando Calero in the derby match against Espanyol. Fati had only entered the match five minutes earlier as a second-half substitute for Nélson Semedo.

==== 2020–21 season ====
On 23 September 2020, Fati was officially promoted to the first team. Four days later, in Barcelona's first match of the 2020–21 La Liga season and the first under new head coach, Ronald Koeman, Fati scored a brace and forced a penalty in a 4–0 win over Villarreal. He scored again in the following match, a 3–0 away win over Celta Vigo on 1 October. His performances led to him being named as the La Liga Player of the Month for September 2020. On 20 October, he scored a goal in a 5–1 win over Ferencváros in the Champions League, to become the first player to score more than one goal in the competition before turning 18.

On 24 October, Fati scored a goal in a 1–3 defeat against Real Madrid, to become the second youngest scorer in El Clásico, at 17 years and 359 days, behind Alfonso Navarro, who scored at 17 years and 356 days on 30 March 1947. On 7 November, Fati suffered a knee injury against Real Betis and was subbed off at half-time; tests later confirmed that he tore the meniscus in his left knee. Two days later he underwent surgery and the club announced that he would be out for approximately four months. Unfortunately, he was out for nine months, ahead of the 2021–22 La Liga season.

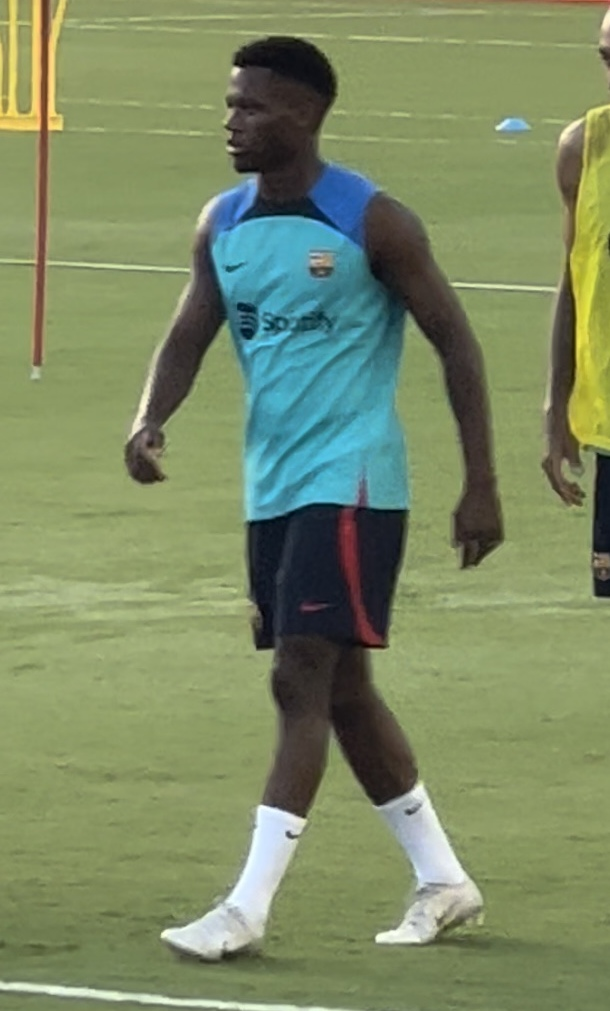
Fati in training for a pre-season game against Inter Miami in 2022

==== 2021–22 season ====
Ahead of the 2021–22 season, Barcelona announced Fati would inherit the number 10 shirt from Lionel Messi. On 5 August 2021, he returned to training on the pitch at the Ciutat Esportiva after nine months out of action. On 26 September, he made his first appearance after 323 days of absence in a 3–0 home victory against Levante. He came on as a substitute, playing for ten minutes and scoring within minutes after coming on.

On 20 January 2022, Fati suffered a hamstring injury in a 3–2 defeat to Athletic Bilbao in the Copa del Rey. On 1 May, he returned after a three-month injury absence to play in a 2–1 win against Mallorca.

==== Loan to Brighton & Hove Albion ====
On 1 September 2023, Fati joined Premier League club Brighton & Hove Albion on a season-long loan deal without an option to buy. He made his Albion debut on 16 September, coming on as a 64th-minute substitute in the 3–1 away win over Manchester United at Old Trafford. He scored his first goal for Brighton on 30 September against Aston Villa in a 1–6 loss at Villa Park. On 26 October, Fati helped Brighton secure their first-ever win in European competition after he scored the second in a 2–0 victory against Ajax in a group stage match, which is his first career goal in the Europa League.

==== Return to Barcelona ====
Following his return to Barcelona in the 2024–25 season, Fati experienced limited playing time under coach Hansi Flick who openly stated that the player needed to undertake "tough work" to regain his place in the team.

==== Loan to Monaco ====
On 1 July 2025, Fati was loaned to Ligue 1 side Monaco until the end of the season with an option to buy. He made his debut for the club in a UEFA Champions League match against Club Brugge, scoring Monaco's only goal in a 4–1 defeat to the Belgian side.

=== Monaco ===
On 30 June 2026, Monaco activated their purchase option for Fati, with him signing a four-year deal.

== International career ==
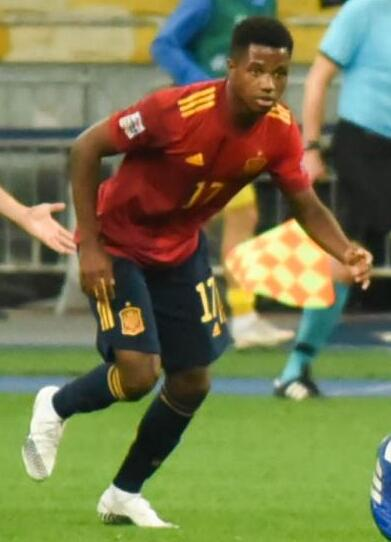
Fati with Spain in 2020

Fati was originally eligible to represent Guinea-Bissau at international level, but did not represent the nation of his birth at any level. After his debut in La Liga, the Royal Spanish Football Federation (RFEF) showed interest in him, with Diario AS reporting that the Spanish government had set its sights on granting Fati citizenship with a view to including him in the squad for the 2019 FIFA U-17 World Cup. He was also reportedly eligible for a Portuguese passport through his grandparents' birth in colonial Portuguese Guinea.

Fati was granted Spanish citizenship on 20 September 2019, renouncing his Bissau-Guinean citizenship. He was called up to the Spain under-21 team on 11 October 2019, following an injury to Carles Pérez. Fati made his debut for the Spain under-21 team on 15 October 2019 against Montenegro.

Fati received his first call up to the full Spain squad on 20 August 2020, for the initial two matches of the 2020–21 UEFA Nations League.

Fati made his full international debut on 3 September 2020, coming off the bench for the second 45 minutes in a 1–1 draw to Germany. He scored his first goal in his first international start on 6 September 2020, scoring Spain's third goal against Ukraine to be the national team's youngest ever goalscorer at the age of 17 years and 311 days; hence, breaking the 95-year record of Juan Errazquin, aged 18 years and 344 days. He also became the youngest player to start a match in the UEFA Nations League, breaking the previous record of Welsh player Ethan Ampadu in 2018, aged 17 years and 357 days. Both these records were beaten by his teammate at Barcelona, Gavi, on 5 June 2022.

On 11 November 2022, it was announced that Fati would be part of Spain's 2022 FIFA World Cup squad. He played two games – both as a substitute – as Spain were knocked out by Morocco in the round of 16.

== Style of play ==
Prior to his struggles with injuries, Fati was considered by several pundits to be one of the most talented and promising young players in the world, drawing comparisons to Lionel Messi. A versatile forward, he is capable of playing in any attacking position; he started his career as a striker, although he was later moved to the position of left winger. Being adept with either foot, despite being naturally right-footed, he is also capable of playing on the right flank, in the centre as a false 9, as a second striker or number 11, or in a free role as an attacking midfielder or number 10.

A 2019 profile by FourFourTwo described Fati with the following words: "Standing at 5ft 10in, Fati boasts a powerful frame and brings a physical approach to the game which is often lacking among a technically gifted Barcelona side. Nevertheless, despite his robust physique, the La Masia graduate possesses outstanding dribbling skills which, when combined with his speed, makes him incredibly difficult to stop in one-on-one situations." It also highlighted his eye for goal and ability in the air, as well as his vision and ability to control play from midfield. His perceived selfishness and decision-making were instead highlighted as weaknesses in his game. Tor-Kristian Karlsen of ESPN described Fati as a "generational talent" in 2021, praising him for his speed, acceleration, ambidexterity, low centre of gravity, and technical skills, which make him difficult to dispossess, also noting his intelligence, movement, defensive work-rate, and link-up play as some of his main strengths.

== Personal life ==
Fati's father, Bori Fati, is an ex-footballer, who was born in Guinea-Bissau. After emigrating to Portugal, Bori played for some teams in the lower leagues. Then he moved to Marinaleda, a small town located near Seville that was offering work to immigrants. After struggling in Marinaleda, he met the mayor, Juan Manuel Sánchez Gordillo, and found a job as a driver. He then settled in the nearby town of Herrera, where Ansu spent most of his childhood, and started his football training. Though born in Guinea-Bissau, Bori has said he is "a Sevillian". On 11 February 2021, Bori founded a marketing agency, A.F. Management SL., which primarily deals with footballers' image rights. The company had a share capital of €10,000. A.F. Management SL. and is registered in the city of Barcelona.

Fati and his family are practising Muslims. During his injuries, he was regularly performing Islamic prayers. He has performed the Islamic pilgrimage of Umrah. He also fasts during Ramadan while playing matches.

== Career statistics ==
=== Club ===
As of match played 18 October 2026

Appearances and goals by club, season and competition
Club	Season	League			National cup (Note: Includes Copa del Rey, FA Cup)		League cup (Note: Includes EFL Cup)		Europe		Other		Total	
Club	Season	Division	Apps	Goals	Apps	Goals	Apps	Goals	Apps	Goals	Apps	Goals	Apps	Goals
Barcelona	2019–20	La Liga	24	7	3	0	—		5 (Note: Appearances in UEFA Champions League)	1	1 (Note: Appearance(s) in Supercopa de España)	0	33	8
Barcelona	2020–21	La Liga	7	4	0	0	—		3	1	0	0	10	5
Barcelona	2021–22	La Liga	10	4	1	0	—		3	1	1	1	15	6
Barcelona	2022–23	La Liga	36	7	5	2	—		8 (Note: Six appearances in UEFA Champions League, two appearances in UEFA Europa League)	0	2	1	51	10
Barcelona	2023–24	La Liga	3	0	—		—		—		—		3	0
Barcelona	2024–25	La Liga	6	0	1	0	—		4	0	0	0	11	0
Barcelona	Total		86	22	10	2	—		23	3	4	2	123	29
Brighton & Hove Albion (loan)	2023–24	Premier League	19	2	1	0	1	0	6 (Note: Appearances in UEFA Europa League)	2	—		27	4
Monaco (loan)	2025–26	Ligue 1	25	11	0	0	—		5	1	—		30	12
Monaco	2026–27	Ligue 1	2	0	0	0	—		1 (Note: Appearance in UEFA Conference League)	1	—		3	1
Monaco	Monaco total		27	11	0	0	—		6	2	—		33	13
Career total			132	35	11	2	1	0	35	7	4	2	183	46

=== International ===
As of match played 15 October 2023

Appearances and goals by national team and year
National team	Year	Apps	Goals
Spain	2020	4	1
Spain	2021	0	0
Spain	2022	3	1
Spain	2023	3	0
Total		10	2

Scores and results list Spain's goal tally first.

List of international goals scored by Ansu Fati
No.	Date	Venue	Cap	Opponent	Score	Result	Competition
1	6 September 2020	Alfredo Di Stéfano Stadium, Madrid, Spain	2	Ukraine	3–0	4–0	2020–21 UEFA Nations League A
2	17 November 2022	Amman International Stadium, Amman, Jordan	5	Jordan	1–0	3–1	Friendly

== Honours ==
Barcelona

- La Liga: 2022–23, 2024–25
- Copa del Rey: 2024–25
- Supercopa de España: 2023

Spain

- UEFA Nations League: 2022–23

Individual

- UEFA La Liga Revelation Team of the Year: 2019–20
- La Liga Player of the Month: September 2020
- IFFHS Men's World Youth (U20) Team: 2020, 2022
- IFFHS Men's Youth (U20) UEFA Team: 2020, 2022
- Goal.com NxGn: 2021

== See also ==
- Afro-Spaniards
- List of Spain international footballers born outside Spain
