= 2023 Supercopa de España =

Spanish football competition played in Saudi Arabia

Tournament details
- Host country: Saudi Arabia
- Dates: 11–15 January 2023
- Teams: 4
- Venue: 1 (in 1 host city)

Final positions
- Champions: Barcelona (14th title)
- Runners-up: Real Madrid

Tournament statistics
- Matches played: 3
- Goals scored: 10 (3.33 per match)
- Attendance: 146,461 (48,820 per match)
- Top scorer(s): Karim Benzema; Robert Lewandowski (2 goals each)

The 2023 Supercopa de España was the 39th edition of the Supercopa de España, an annual football competition for clubs in the Spanish football league system that were successful in its major competitions in the preceding season.

Barcelona won the tournament for their record-extending fourteenth Supercopa de España title.

== Qualification ==
The tournament featured the winners and runners-up of the 2021–22 Copa del Rey and 2021–22 La Liga.

=== Qualified teams ===
The following four teams qualified for the tournament.

| Team | Method of qualification | Appearance | Last appearance as | Previous performance | | |
| Team | Method of qualification | Appearance | Last appearance as | Winner(s) | Runners-up | Semi-finalists |
|---|---|---|---|---|---|---|
| Real Betis | 2021–22 Copa del Rey winners | 2nd | 2005 runners-up | – | 1 | – |
| Real Madrid | 2021–22 La Liga winners | 19th | 2022 winners | 12 | 5 | 1 |
| Valencia | 2021–22 Copa del Rey runners-up | 6th | 2020 semi-finalists | 1 | 3 | 1 |
| Barcelona | 2021–22 La Liga runners-up | 27th | 2022 semi-finalists | 13 | 11 | 2 |

== Venue ==
All three matches were held at the King Fahd International Stadium in Riyadh, Saudi Arabia.

| Location of the host city of the 2022 Supercopa de España. | City | Stadium |
|---|---|---|
| Location of the host city of the 2022 Supercopa de España. | Riyadh | King Fahd International Stadium |
| Location of the host city of the 2022 Supercopa de España. | Capacity: 58,398 | |

== Matches ==
- Times listed are SAST (UTC+3).

=== Bracket ===
Semi-finals
11 January 2023 – Riyadh
Real Madrid (p) | 1 (4)
Valencia | 1 (3)
12 January 2023 – Riyadh
Real Betis | 2 (2)
Barcelona (p) | 2 (4)

Final
15 January 2023 – Riyadh
Real Madrid | 1
Barcelona | 3

=== Semi-finals ===
11 January 2023
22:00

| Real Madrid | 1–1 (a.e.t.) | Valencia |
|---|---|---|
| Benzema 39' (pen.) | Report | Lino 46' |
Penalties
| Benzema (penalty scored); Modrić (penalty scored); Kroos (penalty scored); Asensio (penalty scored) | 4–3 | (penalty scored) Cavani; (penalty missed) Cömert; (penalty scored) Moriba; (penalty scored) Guillamón; (penalty missed) Gayà |

King Fahd International Stadium, Riyadh
Attendance: 50,492
Referee: Alejandro Hernández Hernández (Las Palmas)

12 January 2023
22:00

| Real Betis | 2–2 (a.e.t.) | Barcelona |
|---|---|---|
| Fekir 77'; Loren 101' | Report | Lewandowski 40'; Fati 93' |
Penalties
| Willian José (penalty scored); Loren (penalty scored); Juanmi (penalty missed); Carvalho (penalty missed) | 2–4 | (penalty scored) Lewandowski; (penalty scored) Kessié; (penalty scored) Fati; (penalty scored) Pedri |

King Fahd International Stadium, Riyadh
Attendance: 38,629
Referee: Carlos del Cerro Grande (Community of Madrid)

=== Final ===
15 January 2023
22:00

| Real Madrid | 1–3 | Barcelona |
|---|---|---|
| Benzema 90+3' | Report | Gavi 33'; Lewandowski 45'; Pedri 69' |

King Fahd International Stadium, Riyadh
Attendance: 57,340
Referee: Ricardo de Burgos Bengoetxea (Basque Country)

== See also ==
- 2022–23 La Liga
- 2022–23 Copa del Rey
