= 2021–22 FC Barcelona season =

123rd season in existence of FC Barcelona

Barcelona
2021–22 season
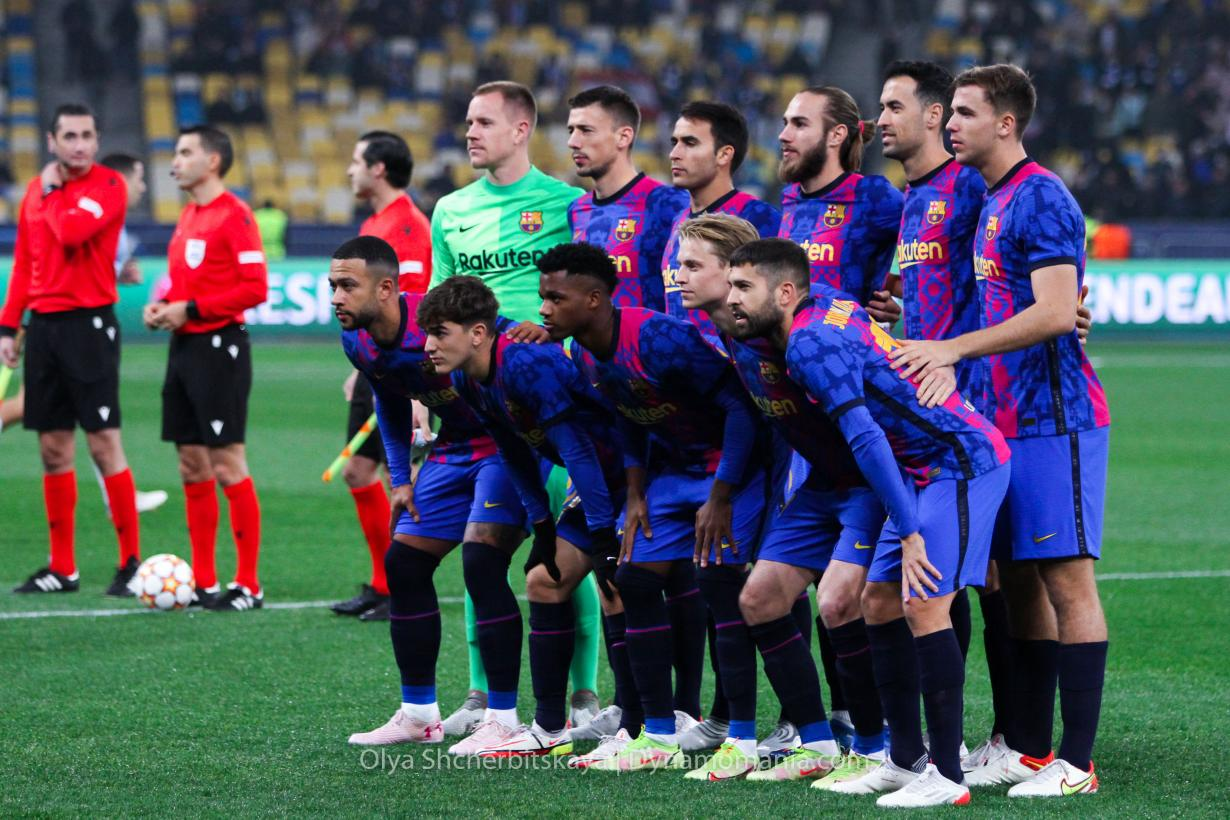
- Barcelona players lining up before a UEFA Champions League match against Dynamo Kyiv in November 2021
- President: Joan Laporta
- Head coach: Ronald Koeman (until 28 October); Sergi Barjuán (interim, from 28 October to 7 November); Xavi (from 8 November)
- Stadium: Camp Nou
- La Liga: 2nd
- Copa del Rey: Round of 16
- Supercopa de España: Semi-finals
- UEFA Champions League: Group stage
- UEFA Europa League: Quarter-finals
- Top goalscorer: League: Memphis Depay (12); All: Pierre-Emerick Aubameyang; Memphis Depay (13 each)
- Highest home attendance: 99,354 vs Real Madrid (24 October 2021)
- Lowest home attendance: 20,384 vs Real Sociedad (15 August 2021)
- Biggest win: Barcelona 4–0 Athletic Bilbao; Barcelona 4–0 Osasuna; Real Madrid 0–4 Barcelona
- Biggest defeat: Barcelona 0–3 Bayern Munich; Benfica 3–0 Barcelona; Bayern Munich 3–0 Barcelona
| Home colours | Away colours | Third colours |

The 2021–22 season was the 123rd season in the existence of Futbol Club Barcelona and its 91st consecutive season in the top flight of Spanish football. In addition to the domestic league, Barcelona participated in this season's editions of the Copa del Rey, the Supercopa de España, the UEFA Champions League, and the UEFA Europa League, entering the latter competition for the first time since 2003–04. This was also the first season since 2003–04 not to feature Lionel Messi, who transferred to Paris Saint-Germain after his contract expired.

The season was a tumultuous one, as Barcelona's economic problems forced the departure of Messi and Griezmann, in addition to not being able to replace them with quality players. Barcelona finished third in their Champions League group and failed to reach the knockout stages for the first time since 2003, when it competed in the UEFA Cup after a disastrous domestic campaign the previous season. Furthermore, poor domestic form saw Barça drop as low as ninth in the league by late October, which triggered head coach Ronald Koeman's sacking. He was replaced by a club legend Xavi, who managed to reverse the team's fortunes with new winter signings Ferran Torres and Pierre-Emerick Aubameyang. The team's highlight of the season was the 4–0 thrashing of Real Madrid at the Bernabéu, which helped propel them to the second place in the standings, one they never relinquished for the rest of the campaign. However, April saw Barcelona get knocked out of the Europa League by Eintracht Frankfurt. Coupled with several league stumbles in April and May, in addition to earlier defeats in the Supercopa de España and Copa del Rey, Barça ended up trophyless, never managing to catch up with runaway leaders Real Madrid.

== Kits ==
- Supplier: Nike
- Sponsor: Rakuten (front) / UNICEF (back)

| Home (Domestic) | Home (European) | Away | Away alt. | Third (2019–20 Fourth) | Goalkeeper 1 | Goalkeeper 2 | Goalkeeper 3 |

=== Kit information ===
This was the final season of Rakuten as Barcelona's main sponsor shirt before replaced by Spotify next season.

- Home: The home kit featured unusual design, instead of blue and red stripes, or halves, or any of the variations used in recent years, the new Barcelona home kit took the graphics from the club crest and applies to the entire front. The shorts were also very unusual, featuring half blue and half red sides together with two blue and red hoops socks. The home kit was used for La Liga and Copa del Rey matches.
- Home (European): Barcelona also released the home kit for European matches. The kit features traditional Barcelona stripes with illustrations that highlighted landmarks of various Barcelona neighborhoods inside the stripes (these include, among others, the three chimneys of Poble Sec or the original La Masia, which is located next to the Camp Nou). The blue shorts and navy socks completed the set.
- Away: The away kit was purple with a shiny iridescent logo and with the blue and red stripes on the sides, purple shorts with blue and red stripes and purple socks completing the set.
- Third: Barcelona continued to use their 2019–20 Senyera fourth kit for the third season in a row. This time, it was featured on a more regular basis compared to the previous seasons, and in fact served as a third kit due to the absence of a new third kit with contrasting colors and also without sleeve sponsor.

== Season overview ==
=== May ===
On 31 May, Barcelona announced the signing of Sergio Agüero from Manchester City on a free transfer.

=== June ===
On 1 June, Barcelona announced the signing of Eric García from Manchester City on a free transfer.

On 2 June, Barcelona announced the signing of Emerson Royal from Real Betis. Barça had informed Betis that they would exercise their option to bring back Emerson after his two-year long loan spell with the Verdiblancos.

On 19 June, Barcelona announced the signing of Memphis Depay from Olympique Lyonnais on a free transfer.

On 27 June, OGC Nice activated their option to buy Jean-Clair Todibo permanently from his loan spell for €8.5 million plus €7 million in variables.

On 29 June, Barcelona and Olympique de Marseille reached an agreement for the transfer of Konrad de la Fuente for €3 million. Barça will also receive a percentage of any future transfer fee. Barça also terminated the contract of Matheus Fernandes.

=== July ===
On 1 July, Lionel Messi's contract expired amidst negotiations to sign a new contract, effectively making Messi a free agent.

On 4 July, Barcelona and Wolverhampton Wanderers reached an agreement for the loan of Francisco Trincão for the rest of the season with an option to buy for €29 million.

On 6 July, Barcelona and Leeds United reached an agreement for the transfer of Junior Firpo for a fee of €15 million.

On 7 July, UD Almería triggered Sergio Akieme's buy option for €3.5 million, with Barcelona reserving a right to 10% of any future sale and a right to first refusal.

On 9 July, Barcelona and SK Rapid Wien reached an agreement over the loan of Yusuf Demir, with Barça receiving an option to buy for €10 million.

On 10 July, Barcelona and Getafe reached an agreement for the transfer of Carles Aleñá.

On 17 July, Monchu joined Granada CF on a free deal following the expiration of his contract, with Barça reserving a right to 50% of any future sale, and a right to first refusal with a buyback option.

=== August ===
Despite reaching an agreement with Messi and having planned to sign a contract on 5 August, the club announced that Messi would not stay at the club due to financial and structural obstacles posed by La Liga regulations. He subsequently joined Paris Saint-Germain on 10 August.

On 15 August, Barcelona defeated Real Sociedad 4–2 at home. Goals from Gerard Piqué, Sergi Roberto and a brace from Martin Braithwaite ensured victory in their first La Liga match of the season.

On 21 August, Barcelona drew with Athletic Bilbao away at San Mamés in the second match of the season. Iñigo Martínez scored for Athletic Club, and Memphis Depay scored his first official goal for Barça to end the match 1–1.

On 29 August, Barcelona defeated Getafe 2–1 at home, thanks to goals from Sergi Roberto and Memphis Depay.

On 31 August, Barcelona reached an agreement with RB Leipzig for the transfer of Ilaix Moriba for €16 million with €6 million in add-ons; reached an agreement with Spezia for the loan of Rey Manaj for a fee of €300,000 with an option to buy for €2.7 million at the end of the season; reached an agreement with Tottenham Hotspur for the transfer of Emerson Royal for €25 million; and reached an agreement with Atlético Madrid for the loan of Antoine Griezmann for a reported fee of €10 million with a mandatory buy option of €40 million. Barça also announced the signing of Luuk de Jong from Sevilla on a season long loan with an option to buy.

=== September ===
On 2 September, Barcelona and Beşiktaş reached an agreement for the loan of Miralem Pjanić for the rest of the season.

On 14 September, Barcelona lost 3–0 at home to Bayern Munich in the first UEFA Champions League game of the season. Thomas Müller and Robert Lewandowski (brace) scored for the Bavarians.

On 20 September, Barcelona drew 1–1 with Granada at home. Barça conceded early in the match, but a goal from Ronald Araújo in the last minute of the game levelled the score.

On 23 September, Barcelona drew 0–0 with Cádiz away from home.

On 26 September, Barcelona defeated Levante 3–0 at home. Memphis, Luuk de Jong and Ansu Fati were the goalscorers, with the latter making his return after a 10-month absence due to injury. De Jong also scored his first goal for Barça.

On 29 September, Barcelona lost 3–0 against Benfica away from home on the second matchday of the Champions League.

=== October ===
On 2 October, Barcelona lost 2–0 against Atlético Madrid away from home. Thomas Lemar and former Barça player Luis Suárez scored the goals.

On 14 October, Barcelona and midfielder Pedri reached an agreement to extend the player's contract for a further four seasons through to 2026 with a release clause of €1 billion.

On 17 October, Barcelona defeated Valencia 3–1 at home. Valencia took the lead early in the match, but goals from Fati, Memphis and Philippe Coutinho ensured victory for Barça.

On 20 October, Barcelona defeated Dynamo Kyiv 1–0 at home in the Champions league. Piqué scored the only goal in the game. Later that day Barcelona announced that they had reached an agreement with Ansu Fati to extend the player's contract for a further five seasons through to 2027 with a release clause of €1 billion.

On 24 October, Barcelona were defeated in El Clásico 2–1 at home, with David Alaba and Lucas Vázquez scoring for Real Madrid. Sergio Agüero scored in the last minute for a late consolation.

On 27 October, Barcelona were again defeated, this time by Rayo Vallecano 1–0 away, with Radamel Falcao scoring the winner in the first half. It was Rayo's first league win over Barça in 19 years.

On 28 October, Barcelona announced the dismissal of Ronald Koeman as the first team coach, ending his spell at the club after 14 months.

On 29 October, Barcelona announced the appointment of Barcelona B head coach Sergi Barjuán as the interim manager of the first team.

On 30 October, Barcelona drew 1–1 with Deportivo Alavés at home. Memphis scored first for the Blaugrana, but Alavés equalised shortly after, courtesy of Luis Rioja.

=== November ===
On 2 November, Barcelona defeated Dynamo Kyiv 1–0 away from home in the Champions league. Ansu Fati scored the only goal in the game.

On 6 November, Barcelona announced the appointment of Xavi as the new first team head coach until 2024. Later that day, Barcelona drew 3–3 with Celta Vigo away from home. Barça had a three-goal lead within the first half with goals from Fati, Busquets and Memphis, but a spirited performance from Celta levelled the score in the second half with the equalising goal from Iago Aspas coming in the final minute.

On 12 November, Barcelona announced an agreement in principle to sign former right-back Dani Alves on a free transfer.

On 20 November, on Xavi's managerial debut, Barcelona defeated Espanyol 1–0 at home in the derbi barceloní. Memphis scored from the penalty spot.

On 23 November, Barcelona drew 0–0 with Benfica at home in the Champions League.

On 27 November, Barcelona defeated Villarreal 3–1 away from home. Frenkie de Jong scored first, but Samuel Chukwueze equalised for the Yellow Submarine. Memphis and Coutinho scored late to seal the win for Barça.

=== December ===
On 4 December, Barcelona lost to Real Betis 1–0 at home. Juanmi scored for the visitors.

On 8 December, Barcelona lost to Bayern 3–0 away from home at an empty Allianz Arena. Müller, Leroy Sané and Jamal Musiala scored for the home side, eliminating Barça from the group stage and making the Blaugrana play in the UEFA Europa League for the first time since 2003.

On 9 December, Barcelona and Granada reached an agreement for the loan of Álex Collado until the end of the season.

On 12 December, Barcelona drew 2–2 with Osasuna away from home. Nico and Abde scored for Barca.

On 15 December, Sergio Agüero announced his retirement in a press conference at the Camp Nou.

On 18 December, Barcelona defeated Elche 3–2 at home. Goals from Ferran Jutglà and Gavi gave an early two goal lead for Barça, But two goals scored by Elche in two minutes made the score level. Nico scored in the late stages of the game to earn victory for Barça.

On 21 December, Barcelona drew 1–1 with Sevilla at the Ramón Sánchez Pizjuán, with Papu Gómez opening the account for Los Rojiblancos and Araújo equalising in the dying moments of the first–half.

On 28 December, Barcelona announced the signing of Ferran Torres, with Torres signing a 5-year contract until 2027, with a buyout clause of €1 billion.

=== January ===
On 2 January, Barcelona defeated Real Mallorca 1–0 at the Visit Mallorca Stadium. Luuk de Jong scored the only goal.

On 5 January, Barcelona started their Copa del Rey campaign with a 2–1 away win against Linares.

On 7 January, Barcelona reached an agreement with Aston Villa for the loan of Philippe Coutinho until the end of the season.

On 8 January, Barcelona drew 1–1 with Granada away from home. Luuk de Jong took the lead for Barcelona but Granada equalised at the closing stages of the game.

On 10 January, Samuel Umtiti extended his contract until 2026, which allowed Barcelona to register Ferran Torres.

On 12 January, the second Clásico of the season was contested, this time at the semi-final stage of the Supercopa de España. Luuk de Jong and Ansu Fati scored equalisers for Barça, but it was not enough as Madrid won 3–2 after extra time.

On 13 January, Barcelona reached an agreement with Rapid Wien to end the loan of Yusuf Demir.

On 20 January, Barcelona were knocked out of the Copa del Rey round of 16 by Athletic Bilbao 3–2 at San Mamés, with Iker Muniain's late winner cancelling out Ferran Torres and Pedri's goals, with the former scoring his first Barça goal.

On 23 January, Barcelona defeated Deportivo Alavés 1–0 away, thanks to a late winner from Frenkie de Jong.

On 29 January, Barcelona announced the signing of Adama Traoré on loan from Wolverhampton Wanderers.

=== February ===
On 5 February, Barcelona announced the signing of Pierre-Emerick Aubameyang for free after his contract with Arsenal was terminated.

On 6 February, Barcelona defeated Atletico Madrid 4–2 at home. Atletico took an early lead but goals from Jordi Alba, Gavi, Araújo and Dani Alves provided a convincing victory for Barça.

On 13 February, Barcelona drew 2–2 with Espanyol away from home. Pedri scored an early goal to give lead for Barça, but two goals from the home side almost made them win the match before a late goal from Luuk de Jong which earned a point for Barcelona.

On 17 February, Barcelona opened their Europa league campaign with a 1–1 draw with Napoli at home in the first leg of the round of 32. Napoli scored first and Ferran Torres converted a penalty to level the score.

On 20 February, Barcelona defeated Valencia 4–1 away from home. A goal from Frenkie de Jong and a hat-trick from Aubameyang gained victory over Los Che.

On 24 February, Barcelona defeated Napoli 4–2 away from home in the second leg of the Europa League round of 32. Jordi Alba, Frenkie de Jong, Pique and Aubameyang scored for Barça.

On 27 February, Barcelona defeated Athletic Bilbao 4–0 at home. Aubameyang, Dembélé, Luuk de Jong and Memphis Depay scored for Barcelona to secure three points.

=== March ===
On 6 March, Barcelona defeated Elche 2–1 away from home. Elche scored late in the first half, but goals from Torres and Depay turned the game in favour of Barcelona.

On 10 March, Barcelona drew 0–0 with Galatasaray at home in the first leg of the Europa League round of 16.

On 13 March, Barcelona defeated Osasuna 4–0 at home. Ferran Torres scored a brace while Aubameyang and Riqui Puig added a goal each.

On 17 March, Barcelona defeated Galatasaray 2–1 away from home in the second leg of the Europa League round of 16. Galatasaray scored the first goal of the match but goals from Pedri and Aubameyang cancelled out their lead and secured 2–1 aggregate victory for Barça.

On 20 March, in the third Clásico of the season, Barcelona defeated Real Madrid 4–0 away from home. A brace from Aubameyang and goals from Araújo and Torres secured a crushing victory at the Bernabeu.

=== April ===
On 3 April, Barcelona defeated Sevilla 1–0 at home. Pedri scored the only goal of the match. With this win, Barça climes up to second in the league standings.

On 7 April, Barcelona drew 1–1 with Eintracht Frankfurt away from home in the first leg of the Europa League quarter-finals. Ferran Torres scored for Barcelona.

On 10 April, Barcelona defeated Levante 3–2 away from home. Aubameyang and Pedri scored for Barça while having conceded two penalties. Luuk de Jong scored a late goal to earn the victory for Barcelona.

On 14 April, Barcelona lost to Eintracht Frankfurt 3–2 at home in the second leg of the Europa League quarter-finals. Frankfurt dominated the game having a three-goal lead until the end of the regulation time. Barcelona's goals came in the stoppage time with Busquets scoring and Depay converting a penalty. With an aggregate score of 4–3, Barcelona were eliminated from the Europa League.

On 18 April, Barcelona lost to Cádiz 1–0 at home.

On 21 April, Barcelona defeated Real Sociedad 1–0 away from home. Aubameyang scored the only goal in the first half of the match.

On 24 April, Barcelona lost to Rayo Vallecano 1–0 at home.

On 26 April, Barcelona and defender Ronald Araújo reached an agreement to extend the player's contract through to 2026 with a release clause of €1 billion.

=== May ===
On 1 May, Barcelona defeated Real Mallorca 2–1 at home. Memphis Depay and Sergio Busquets scored for Barça.

On 7 May, Barcelona defeated Real Betis 2–1 away from home. Ansu Fati scored while former Barça player Marc Bartra scored the equaliser for Betis. Jordi Alba scored in the final minutes of the match to earn the victory.

On 10 May, Barcelona defeated Celta Vigo 3–1 at home. Memphis scored a goal while Aubameyang added a brace.

On 12 May, Aston Villa triggered Philippe Coutinho's option to buy for a fee of €20 million with Barça receiving a 50% sell-on percentage.

On 15 May, Barcelona drew 0–0 with Getafe away from home.

On 22 May, Barcelona lost to Villarreal 2–0 at home in the last game of the season. Barcelona finished their league campaign in the second position, qualifying for the next season's Supercopa de España and UEFA Champions League.

== Players ==
=== First team ===
| N | Pos. | Nat. | Name | Age | EU | Since | App | Goals | Ends | Transfer fee | Notes |
|---|---|---|---|---|---|---|---|---|---|---|---|
| 1 | GK | (Germany) | Marc-André ter Stegen | 30 | EU | 2014 | 327 | 0 | 2025 | €12M | |
| 2 | DF | (United States) | Sergiño Dest | 21 | EU | 2020 | 72 | 3 | 2025 | €21M | Second nationality: Netherlands |
| 3 | DF | (Spain) | Gerard Piqué (vice-captain) | 35 | EU | 2008 | 606 | 53 | 2024 | €5M | Originally from Youth system |
| 4 | DF | (Uruguay) | Ronald Araújo | 23 | Non-EU | 2019 | 82 | 6 | 2026 | €1.7M | |
| 5 | MF | (Spain) | Sergio Busquets (captain) | 33 | EU | 2008 | 680 | 18 | 2023 | Youth system | |
| 6 | MF | (Spain) | Riqui Puig | 22 | EU | 2018 | 57 | 2 | 2023 | Youth system | |
| 7 | FW | (France) | Ousmane Dembélé | 25 | EU | 2017 | 150 | 32 | 2022 | €105M | |
| 8 | DF | (Brazil) | Dani Alves | 39 | EU | 2022 (Winter) | 408 | 22 | 2022 | Free | Second nationality: Spain |
| 9 | FW | (Netherlands) | Memphis Depay | 28 | EU | 2021 | 38 | 13 | 2023 | Free | Second nationality: Ghana |
| 10 | FW | (Spain) | Ansu Fati | 19 | EU | 2019 | 58 | 19 | 2027 | Youth system | |
| 11 | FW | (Spain) | Adama Traoré | 26 | EU | 2022 (Winter) | 21 | 1 | 2022 | Loan | Originally from Youth system On loan from Wolverhampton Wanderers |
| 12 | FW | (Denmark) | Martin Braithwaite | 30 | EU | 2020 (Winter) | 58 | 10 | 2024 | €18M | |
| 13 | GK | (Brazil) | Neto | 32 | EU | 2019 | 21 | 0 | 2023 | €26M | Second nationality: Italy |
| 14 | MF | (Spain) | Nico González | 20 | EU | 2021 | 37 | 2 | 2024 | Youth system | |
| 15 | DF | (France) | Clément Lenglet | 27 | EU | 2018 | 160 | 7 | 2026 | €35.9M | |
| 16 | MF | (Spain) | Pedri | 19 | EU | 2020 | 74 | 9 | 2026 | €5M | |
| 17 | FW | (Netherlands) | Luuk de Jong | 31 | EU | 2021 | 29 | 7 | 2022 | Loan | On loan from Sevilla |
| 18 | DF | (Spain) | Jordi Alba (4th captain) | 33 | EU | 2012 | 429 | 25 | 2024 | €14M | Originally from Youth system |
| 19 (Note: The number 19 was originally Sergio Aguero. Due to Aguero's heart problem that forced him to retire on 15 December 2021, Ferran Torres took the number 19 on 11 January 2022.) | FW | (Spain) | Ferran Torres | 22 | EU | 2022 (Winter) | 26 | 7 | 2027 | €55M | |
| 20 | MF | (Spain) | Sergi Roberto (3rd captain) | 30 | EU | 2010 | 316 | 12 | 2022 | Youth system | |
| 21 | MF | (Netherlands) | Frenkie de Jong | 25 | EU | 2019 | 140 | 13 | 2026 | €75M | |
| 22 | DF | (Spain) | Óscar Mingueza | 23 | EU | 2020 | 66 | 2 | 2023 | Youth system | |
| 23 | DF | (France) | Samuel Umtiti | 28 | EU | 2016 | 133 | 2 | 2026 | €25M | |
| 24 | DF | (Spain) | Eric García | 21 | EU | 2021 | 36 | 0 | 2026 | Free | Originally from Youth system |
| 25 | FW | (Gabon) | Pierre-Emerick Aubameyang | 32 | EU | 2022 (Winter) | 23 | 13 | 2025 | Free | Second nationality: France |

- Last updated: 22 May 2022
- Source: FCBarcelona.com, LaLiga.com and UEFA.com
- Ordered by squad number.

=== From Barcelona B and Youth Academy ===
| N | Pos. | Nat. | Name | Age | EU | Since | App | Goals | Ends | Transfer fee | Notes |
|---|---|---|---|---|---|---|---|---|---|---|---|
| 27 | GK | (Montenegro) | Lazar Carević | 23 | Non-EU | 2021 | 0 | 0 | 2023 | Youth system | |
| 29 | FW | (Spain) | Ferran Jutglà | 23 | EU | 2021 | 9 | 2 | 2022 | Free | |
| 30 | MF | (Spain) | Gavi | 17 | EU | 2021 | 47 | 2 | 2023 | Youth system | |
| 31 | DF | (Spain) | Alejandro Balde | 18 | EU | 2021 | 7 | 0 | 2024 | Youth system | |
| 33 | FW | (Morocco) | Abde Ezzalzouli | 20 | EU | 2021 | 12 | 1 | 2024 | €2M | Second nationality: Spain |
| 34 | MF | (Spain) | Álvaro Sanz | 21 | EU | 2021 | 3 | 0 | 2023 | Youth system | |
| 35 | DF | (Spain) | Arnau Comas | 22 | EU | 2021 | 0 | 0 | 2022 | Youth system | |
| 36 | GK | (Spain) | Arnau Tenas | 21 | EU | 2019 | 0 | 0 | 2023 | Youth system | |
| 37 | FW | (Spain) | Ilias Akhomach | 18 | EU | 2021 | 3 | 0 | 2023 | Youth system | |
| 38 | DF | (Spain) | Guillem Jaime | 23 | EU | 2021 | 0 | 0 | 2022 | Free | Originally from Youth system |
| 39 | FW | (Spain) | Estanis Pedrola | 18 | EU | 2022 | 1 | 0 | 2024 | Youth system | |
| 40 | MF | (Brazil) | Lucas de Vega | 22 | EU | 2022 | 0 | 0 | 2022 | Youth system | Second nationality: Spain |
| 41 | DF | (Spain) | Mika Màrmol | 20 | EU | 2022 | 1 | 0 | 2023 | Youth system | |
| 42 | GK | (Spain) | Ander Astralaga | 18 | EU | 2022 | 0 | 0 | 2023 | Youth system | |
| 43 | MF | (Spain) | Jandro Orellana | 26 | EU | 2022 | 0 | 0 | 2023 | Youth system | |
| 44 | MF | (Spain) | Antonio Aranda | 21 | EU | 2022 | 0 | 0 | 2023 | Free | |

- Last updated: 15 May 2022
- Source: FCBarcelona.com, LaLiga.com and UEFA.com
- Ordered by squad number.

== Transfers ==
=== In ===
| No. | Pos | Player | Transferred from | Fee | Date | Source |
|---|---|---|---|---|---|---|
| 19 | FW | (Argentina) Sergio Agüero | (England) Manchester City | Free transfer | 1 July 2021 (Note: Deal agreed on 31 May 2021) | |
| 24 | DF | (Spain) Eric García | (England) Manchester City | Free transfer | 1 July 2021 (Note: Deal agreed on 1 June 2021) | |
| 22 | DF | (Brazil) Emerson Royal | Real Betis | €9,000,000 | 1 July 2021 (Note: Deal agreed on 2 June 2021) | |
| 9 | FW | (Netherlands) Memphis Depay | (France) Lyon | Free transfer | 1 July 2021 (Note: Deal agreed on 19 June 2021) | |
| 8 | DF | (Brazil) Dani Alves | Free agent | Free transfer | 17 November 2021 (Note: Cannot play until 1 January 2022) | |
| 19 | FW | (Spain) Ferran Torres | (England) Manchester City | €55,000,000 (Note: Fee Could rise to €65,000,000) | 1 January 2022 (Note: Deal agreed on 28 December 2021) | |
| 25 | FW | (Gabon) Pierre-Emerick Aubameyang | (England) Arsenal | Free transfer | 2 February 2022 | |
| Total | | | | | €64,000,000 | |

=== Out ===
| No. | Pos | Player | Transferred to | Fee | Date | Source |
|---|---|---|---|---|---|---|
| 19 | MF | (Brazil) Matheus Fernandes | (Brazil) Palmeiras | Contract termination | 29 June 2021 | |
| – | FW | (United States) Konrad de la Fuente | (France) Marseille | €3,500,000 | 1 July 2021 (Note: Deal agreed on 29 June 2021) | |
| – | DF | (Spain) Juan Miranda | Real Betis | Free transfer | 1 July 2021 (Note: Deal agreed on 1 June 2021) | |
| – | DF | (France) Jean-Clair Todibo | (France) Nice | €8,500,000 (Note: Fee may eventually rise to €15,500,000) | 1 July 2021 (Note: Deal agreed on 27 June 2021) | |
| 10 | FW | (Argentina) Lionel Messi | (France) Paris Saint-Germain | Free transfer | 1 July 2021 (Note: Joined on 10 August) | |
| 24 | DF | (Spain) Junior Firpo | (England) Leeds United | €15,000,000 | 6 July 2021 | |
| – | DF | (Spain) Sergio Akieme | Almería | €3,500,000 | 7 July 2021 | |
| 6 | MF | (Spain) Carles Aleñá | Getafe | €5,000,000 | 10 July 2021 | |
| – | MF | (Spain) Monchu | Granada | Free transfer | 16 July 2021 | |
| – | MF | (Guinea) Ilaix Moriba | (Germany) RB Leipzig | €16,000,000 (Note: Fee may eventually rise to €22,000,000) | 31 August 2021 | |
| 22 | DF | (Brazil) Emerson Royal | (England) Tottenham Hotspur | €25,000,000 (Note: €5,000,000 of the €25,000,000 will be paid to Real Betis) | 31 August 2021 | |
| 19 | FW | (Argentina) Sergio Agüero | Retired | | 15 December 2021 | |
| 11 | FW | (Austria) Yusuf Demir | (Austria) Rapid Wien | Loan return | 13 January 2022 | |
| Total | | | | | €76,500,000 | |

=== Loans in ===
| No. | Pos | Player | Loaned from | Fee | Date | On loan until | Source |
|---|---|---|---|---|---|---|---|
| 11 | FW | (Austria) Yusuf Demir | (Austria) Rapid Wien | €500,000 (Note: Option to buy for €10,000,000 at the end of the season) | 9 July 2021 | End of season (Note: Loan terminated on 13 January 2022) | |
| 17 | FW | (Netherlands) Luuk de Jong | Sevilla | €1,000,000 (Note: Option to buy for €10,000,000 at the end of the season) | 31 August 2021 | End of Season | |
| 11 | FW | (Spain) Adama Traoré | (England) Wolverhampton Wanderers | None (Note: Option to buy for €30,000,000 at the end of the season) | 29 January 2022 | End of season | |
| Total | | | | | | €1,500,000 | |

=== Loans out ===
| No. | Pos | Player | Loaned to | Fee | Date | On loan until | Source |
|---|---|---|---|---|---|---|---|
| 17 | FW | (Portugal) Francisco Trincão | (England) Wolverhampton Wanderers | €6,000,000 (Note: Option to buy for €29,000,000 at the end of the season) | 4 July 2021 | End of Season | |
| 17 | FW | (Albania) Rey Manaj | (Italy) Spezia | €300,000 (Note: Option to buy for €2,700,000 at the end of the season) | 31 August 2021 | End of Season | |
| 7 | FW | (France) Antoine Griezmann | Atlético Madrid | €10,000,000 (Note: Obligation to buy for €40,000,000) | 31 August 2021 | End of Season (Note: Used the option to extend the loan to the end of next season on 10 August 2022) | |
| 8 | MF | (Bosnia and Herzegovina) Miralem Pjanić | (Turkey) Beşiktaş | €3,000,000 | 2 September 2021 | End of Season | |
| 32 | MF | (Spain) Álex Collado | Granada | None | 7 January 2022 (Note: Deal agreed on 9 December 2021) | End of Season | |
| 14 | MF | (Brazil) Philippe Coutinho | (England) Aston Villa | None (Note: Option to buy for €35,000,000 at the end of the season) | 7 January 2022 | End of Season | |
| 26 | GK | (Spain) Iñaki Peña | (Turkey) Galatasaray | None | 31 January 2022 | End of Season | |
| Total | | | | | | €19,300,000 | |

=== Transfer summary ===
Undisclosed fees are not included in the transfer totals.

Expenditure

Summer: ▼€10,500,000

Winter: ▼€55,000,000

Total: ▼€65,500,000

Income

Summer: ▲€95,800,000

Winter: ▲€0,000,000

Total: ▲€95,800,000

Net totals

Summer: ▲€85,300,000

Winter: ▼€55,000,000

Total: ▲€30,300,000

== Pre-season and friendlies ==
Win Draw Loss Fixtures

| 21 July 2021 Friendly | Barcelona | 4–0 | Gimnàstic | Barcelona, Spain |
| 19:00 CEST (UTC+2) | Manaj 60', 86', 90' (pen.); Collado 85' | Report | Ribelles (yellow card) 19'; Quintanilla (red card) 38'; Trilles (yellow card) 58' | Stadium: Johan Cruyff Stadium; Attendance: 2,037; Referee: Alejandro Muñiz Ruiz |

| 24 July 2021 Friendly | Barcelona | 3–1 | Girona | Barcelona, Spain |
| 19:00 CEST (UTC+2) | Piqué 21' (pen.); Manaj 24'; Depay 85' (pen.) | Report | Sáiz 42' (pen.) | Stadium: Johan Cruyff Stadium; Attendance: 2,858; Referee: Miguel Ángel Ortiz Arias |

| 31 July 2021 Friendly | VfB Stuttgart | 0–3 | Barcelona | Stuttgart, Germany |
| 19:00 CEST (UTC+2) | | Report | Depay 21'; Demir 36'; Puig 73'; Busquets (yellow card) 87' | Stadium: Mercedes-Benz Arena; Attendance: 25,000; Referee: Tobias Reichel |

| 4 August 2021 Friendly | Red Bull Salzburg | 2–1 | Barcelona | Wals-Siezenheim, Austria |
| 19:00 CEST (UTC+2) | Camara (yellow card) 27'; Sučić 43'; Bernède (yellow card) 48'; Aaronson 90' | Report | Braithwaite 83' | Stadium: Red Bull Arena; Referee: Rene Eisner |

| 8 August 2021 Joan Gamper Trophy | Barcelona | 3–0 | Juventus | Barcelona, Spain |
| 21:30 CEST (UTC+2) | Depay 3'; Braithwaite (yellow card) 35', (goal) 57'; Emerson (yellow card) 82'; Puig 90+2' | Report | McKennie (yellow card) 56' | Stadium: Johan Cruyff Stadium; Attendance: 2,924; Referee: César Soto Grado |

| 13 October 2021 Friendly | Barcelona | 2–2 | Cornellà | Barcelona, Spain |
| 11:00 CEST (UTC+2) | Agüero; Coutinho | Report | Pla; Gila | Stadium: Ciutat Esportiva Joan Gamper |

| 14 December 2021 Maradona Cup | Barcelona | 1–1 (2–4 p) | Boca Juniors | Riyadh, Saudi Arabia |
| 20:00 AST (UTC+3) | Jutglà 51' | Report | Zeballos 77' | Stadium: Mrsool Park; Referee: Fahad Al-Mirdasi (Saudi Arabia) |
| | Penalties |
| | Dani Alves (penalty scored); Jutglà (penalty scored); Matheus (penalty missed); Jaime (penalty missed) | | (penalty scored) Rojo; (penalty scored) Izquierdoz; (penalty scored) Pavón; (penalty scored) Molinas |

| 25 May 2022 A-Leagues All Stars Game | A-Leagues All Stars | 2–3 | Barcelona | Sydney, Australia |
| | Piscopo 47'; Traoré 53' | Report | Dembélé 34'; Traoré 72'; Fati 77' | Stadium: Accor Stadium; Attendance: 70,174; Referee: Alex King |

== Competitions ==
=== Overall record ===
| Competition | First match | Last match | Starting round | Final position | Record | | | | | | | |
| Competition | First match | Last match | Starting round | Final position | Pld | W | D | L | GF | GA | GD | Win % |
|---|---|---|---|---|---|---|---|---|---|---|---|---|
| La Liga | 15 August 2021 | 22 May 2022 | Matchday 1 | 2nd | 38 | 21 | 10 | 7 | 68 | 38 | +30 | 55.26 |
| Copa del Rey | 5 January 2022 | 20 January 2022 | Round of 32 | Round of 16 | 2 | 1 | 0 | 1 | 4 | 4 | +0 | 50.00 |
| Supercopa de España | 12 January 2022 | | Semi-finals | Semi-finals | 1 | 0 | 0 | 1 | 2 | 3 | −1 | 0.00 |
| UEFA Champions League | 14 September 2021 | 8 December 2021 | Group stage | Group stage | 6 | 2 | 1 | 3 | 2 | 9 | −7 | 33.33 |
| UEFA Europa League | 17 February 2022 | 14 April 2022 | Knockout round play-offs | Quarter-finals | 6 | 2 | 3 | 1 | 10 | 8 | +2 | 33.33 |
| Total | | | | | 53 | 26 | 14 | 13 | 86 | 62 | +24 | 49.06 |

Source: Soccerway

=== La Liga ===
==== League table ====
| Pos | Team | Pld | W | D | L | GF | GA | GD | Pts | Qualification or relegation |
|---|---|---|---|---|---|---|---|---|---|---|
| 1 | Real Madrid (C) | 38 | 26 | 8 | 4 | 80 | 31 | +49 | 86 | Qualification for the Champions League group stage |
| 2 | Barcelona | 38 | 21 | 10 | 7 | 68 | 38 | +30 | 73 | Qualification for the Champions League group stage |
| 3 | Atlético Madrid | 38 | 21 | 8 | 9 | 65 | 43 | +22 | 71 | Qualification for the Champions League group stage |
| 4 | Sevilla | 38 | 18 | 16 | 4 | 53 | 30 | +23 | 70 | Qualification for the Champions League group stage |
| 5 | Real Betis | 38 | 19 | 8 | 11 | 62 | 40 | +22 | 65 | Qualification for the Europa League group stage (Note: Since the winners of the 2021–22 Copa del Rey, Real Betis, qualified for European competition based on league position, the Europa League berth awarded to the Copa del Rey winners was passed to the sixth-placed team, and the Europa Conference League berth awarded to the sixth-placed team was passed to the seventh-placed team.) |

Source: LaLiga Santander
Rules for classification: 1) Points; 2) Head-to-head points; 3) Head-to-head goal difference; 4) Goal difference; 5) Goals scored; 6) Fair-play points (Note: Head-to-head record is used only after all the matches between the teams in question have been played)
(C) Champions

==== Results summary ====
| Overall | | | | | | | | Home | | | | | | Away | | | | | |
| Pld | W | D | L | GF | GA | GD | Pts | W | D | L | GF | GA | GD | W | D | L | GF | GA | GD |
|---|---|---|---|---|---|---|---|---|---|---|---|---|---|---|---|---|---|---|---|
| 38 | 21 | 10 | 7 | 68 | 38 | +30 | 73 | 12 | 2 | 5 | 37 | 19 | +18 | 9 | 8 | 2 | 31 | 19 | +12 |

Source: La Liga

==== Results by round ====
| Round | 1 | 2 | 3 | 4 | 5 | 6 | 7 | 8 | 9 | 10 | 11 | 12 | 13 | 14 | 15 | 16 | 17 | 18 | 19 | 20 | 21 | 22 | 23 | 24 | 25 | 26 | 27 | 28 | 29 | 30 | 31 | 32 | 33 | 34 | 35 | 36 | 37 | 38 |
|---|---|---|---|---|---|---|---|---|---|---|---|---|---|---|---|---|---|---|---|---|---|---|---|---|---|---|---|---|---|---|---|---|---|---|---|---|---|---|
| Ground | H | A | H | A | H | A | H | A | H | H | A | H | A | H | A | H | A | H | A | A | H | A | H | A | A | H | A | H | A | H | A | H | A | H | A | H | A | H |
| Result | W | D | W | D | D | D | W | L | W | L | L | D | D | W | W | L | D | W | W | D | L | W | W | D | W | W | W | W | W | W | W | L | W | W | W | W | D | L |
| Position | 3 | 4 | 4 | 7 | 7 | 7 | 6 | 9 | 7 | 9 | 9 | 9 | 9 | 7 | 7 | 7 | 8 | 8 | 5 | 6 | 6 | 5 | 4 | 4 | 4 | 4 | 3 | 3 | 3 | 2 | 2 | 2 | 2 | 2 | 2 | 2 | 2 | 2 |

Source: La Liga
A = Away; H = Home; W = Win; D = Draw; L = Loss; P = Postponed

==== Matches ====
The league fixtures were announced on 30 June 2021.

| 15 August 2021 1 | Barcelona | 4–2 | Real Sociedad | Barcelona |
| 20:00 CEST (UTC+2) | Piqué 19'; Braithwaite 45+2', 59'; Busquets (yellow card) 57'; González (yellow card) 84'; Roberto 90+1' | Report | Zubimendi (yellow card) 37'; Elustondo (yellow card) 61'; Muñoz (yellow card) 62'; Le Normand (yellow card) 78'; Lobete 82'; Oyarzabal 85' | Stadium: Camp Nou; Attendance: 20,384; Referee: Alejandro Hernández Hernández |

| 21 August 2021 2 | Athletic Bilbao | 1–1 | Barcelona | Bilbao |
| 22:00 CEST (UTC+2) | Martínez (yellow card) 20', (goal) 50' | Report | García (yellow card) 28', (red card) 90+3'; Depay 75'; Alba (yellow card) 76' | Stadium: San Mamés; Attendance: 9,394; Referee: Juan Martínez Munuera |

| 29 August 2021 3 | Barcelona | 2–1 | Getafe | Barcelona |
| 17:00 CEST (UTC+2) | Roberto 2'; Araújo (yellow card) 27'; Depay 30', (yellow card) 62'; Lenglet (yellow card) 86' | Report | Sandro 19'; Aleñá (yellow card) 21' | Stadium: Camp Nou; Attendance: 26,543; Referee: Pablo González Fuertes |

| 20 September 2021 5 | Barcelona | 1–1 | Granada | Barcelona |
| 21:00 CEST (UTC+2) | Mingueza (yellow card) 77'; Araújo (yellow card) 88', (goal) 90'; Piqué (yellow card) 90+3' | Report | Duarte 2'; Montoro (yellow card) 40'; Gonalons (yellow card) 71'; Maximiano (yellow card) 86'; Monchu (yellow card) 87'; Quini (yellow card) 88'; Bacca (yellow card) 90+2' | Stadium: Camp Nou; Attendance: 27,097; Referee: Santiago Jaime Latre |

| 23 September 2021 6 | Cádiz | 0–0 | Barcelona | Cádiz |
| 22:00 CEST (UTC+2) | Haroyan (yellow card) 68'; Akapo (yellow card) 88'; Alarcón (yellow card) 90' | Report | F. de Jong (yellow card) 61' (yellow-red card) 65'; Roberto (yellow card) 65'; Busquets (yellow card) 90+6' | Stadium: Nuevo Mirandilla; Attendance: 12,180; Referee: Carlos del Cerro Grande |

| 26 September 2021 7 | Barcelona | 3–0 | Levante | Barcelona |
| 16:15 CEST (UTC+2) | Depay 6' (pen.); L. de Jong 14'; Gavi (yellow card) 24'; Fati 90+1' | Report | Postigo (yellow card) 25'; Pepelu (yellow card) 58'; Clerc (yellow card) 86' | Stadium: Camp Nou; Attendance: 35,334; Referee: Isidro Díaz De Mera Escuderos |

| 2 October 2021 8 | Atlético Madrid | 2–0 | Barcelona | Madrid |
| 21:00 CEST (UTC+2) | Lemar 23'; Suárez 44'; De Paul (yellow card) 45+1'; Koke (yellow card) 78' | Report | Gavi (yellow card) 20' | Stadium: Wanda Metropolitano; Attendance: 60,594; Referee: César Soto Grado |

| 17 October 2021 9 | Barcelona | 3–1 | Valencia | Barcelona |
| 21:00 CEST (UTC+2) | Fati 13'; Gavi (yellow card) 20'; Busquets (yellow card) 32'; Depay 41' (pen.); Coutinho 85' | Report | Gayà 5', (yellow card) 39'; Foulquier (yellow card) 63'; Gómez (yellow card) 82' | Stadium: Camp Nou; Attendance: 47,317; Referee: Jesús Gil Manzano |

| 24 October 2021 10 | Barcelona | 1–2 | Real Madrid | Barcelona |
| 16:15 CEST (UTC+2) | Piqué (yellow card) 58'; Agüero 90+7' | Report | Alaba 32'; Mendy (yellow card) 80'; Vázquez 90+4' | Stadium: Camp Nou; Attendance: 86,422; Referee: José María Sánchez Martínez |

| 27 October 2021 11 | Rayo Vallecano | 1–0 | Barcelona | Madrid |
| 19:00 CEST (UTC+2) | Trejo (yellow card) 24'; Falcao 30'; Saveljich (yellow card) 83' | Report | Coutinho (yellow card) 53'; Piqué (yellow card) 66'; Depay (penalty missed) 72' | Stadium: Vallecas; Attendance: 9,340; Referee: Antonio Mateu Lahoz |

| 30 October 2021 12 | Barcelona | 1–1 | Alavés | Barcelona |
| 21:00 CEST (UTC+2) | Depay 49' | Report | Sivera (yellow card) 45+5'; Rioja 52'; Duarte (yellow card) 82' | Stadium: Camp Nou; Attendance: 37,278; Referee: Jorge Figueroa Vázquez |

| 6 November 2021 13 | Celta Vigo | 3–3 | Barcelona | Vigo |
| 16:15 CET (UTC+1) | Solari (yellow card) 37'; Aspas 52', 90+6', (yellow card) 90+7'; Tapia (yellow card) 55'; Nolito 74' | Report | Fati 5'; Busquets 18', (yellow card) 88'; García (yellow card) 29'; Depay 34'; Alba (yellow card) 45'; Ter Stegen (yellow card) 90+3'; Ezzalzouli (yellow card) 90+5'; F. de Jong (yellow card) 90+6' | Stadium: Balaídos; Attendance: 13,146; Referee: Alejandro Hernández Hernández |

| 20 November 2021 14 | Barcelona | 1–0 | Espanyol | Barcelona |
| 21:00 CET (UTC+1) | Depay 48' (pen.); Ezzalzouli (yellow card) 59'; Mingueza (yellow card) 64'; F. de Jong (yellow card) 83'; Ter Stegen (yellow card) 90' | Report | Pedrosa (yellow card) 59'; Cabrera (yellow card) 90+3' | Stadium: Camp Nou; Attendance: 74,418; Referee: Carlos del Cerro Grande |
Note: First league match with Xavi as manager.

| 27 November 2021 15 | Villarreal | 1–3 | Barcelona | Villarreal |
| 21:00 CET (UTC+1) | Pino (yellow card) 26'; Chukwueze 76'; Raba (yellow card) 90+1' | Report | Alba (yellow card) 26'; Piqué (yellow card) 44'; F. de Jong 48'; Depay 88'; Coutinho 90+4' (pen.) | Stadium: Estadio de la Cerámica; Attendance: 19,050; Referee: César Soto Grado |

| 4 December 2021 16 | Barcelona | 0–1 | Real Betis | Barcelona |
| 16:15 CET (UTC+1) | González (yellow card) 42' | Report | Willian José (yellow card) 12'; Rodríguez (yellow card) 73'; Juanmi 79' | Stadium: Camp Nou; Attendance: 66,529; Referee: Pablo González Fuertes |

| 12 December 2021 17 | Osasuna | 2–2 | Barcelona | Pamplona |
| 16:15 CET (UTC+1) | D. García 14', (yellow card) 67'; Vidal (yellow card) 28'; R. García (yellow card) 37'; Cruz (yellow card) 49'; Sánchez (yellow card) 56'; Ávila 86' | Report | González 12'; Ezzalzouli 49'; Gavi (yellow card) 74'; Ter Stegen (yellow card) 83'; Piqué (yellow card) 89'; Umtiti (yellow card) 90+6' | Stadium: El Sadar; Attendance: 21,427; Referee: Juan Martínez Munuera |

| 18 December 2021 18 | Barcelona | 3–2 | Elche | Barcelona |
| 18:30 CET (UTC+1) | Jutglà 16'; Gavi 19'; García (yellow card) 79'; González 85' | Report | Morente 62'; Milla 63', (yellow card) 71'; Gumbau (yellow card) 77'; Roco (yellow card) 86' | Stadium: Camp Nou; Attendance: 41,664; Referee: Javier Alberola Rojas |

| 21 December 2021 4 | Sevilla | 1–1 | Barcelona | Seville |
| 21:30 CET (UTC+1) | Gómez 32'; Delaney (yellow card) 35'; Koundé (red card) 64'; Juanlu (yellow card) 88' | Report | Busquets (yellow card) 11'; Araújo 45'; Ezzalzouli (yellow card) 74'; Gavi (yellow card) 77' | Stadium: Ramón Sánchez Pizjuán; Attendance: 31,358; Referee: Carlos del Cerro Grande |
Note: The match was originally scheduled for 11 September 2021, but was postponed due to the late return of several South American players from international duty.

| 2 January 2022 19 | Mallorca | 0–1 | Barcelona | Palma |
| 21:00 CET (UTC+1) | Costa (yellow card) 83'; Abdón (yellow card) 89'; Rodríguez (yellow card) 90+4'; Maffeo (yellow card) 90+5'; Valjent (yellow card) 90+6' | Report | L. de Jong 44'; Jutglà (yellow card) 79'; Lenglet (yellow card) 90+4' | Stadium: Visit Mallorca Estadi; Attendance: 14,654; Referee: Antonio Mateu Lahoz |

| 8 January 2022 20 | Granada | 1–1 | Barcelona | Granada |
| 18:30 CET (UTC+1) | Gonalons (yellow card) 31'; Puertas 89'; Bacca (yellow card) 90+3' | Report | Gavi (yellow card) 22' (yellow-red card) 79'; Lenglet (yellow card) 56'; L. de Jong 57'; Depay (yellow card) 69'; Ezzalzouli (yellow card) 83' | Stadium: Nuevo Los Cármenes; Attendance: 14,442; Referee: Pablo González Fuertes |

| 23 January 2022 22 | Alavés | 0–1 | Barcelona | Vitoria-Gasteiz |
| 21:00 CET (UTC+1) | | Report | F. de Jong 87' | Stadium: Mendizorrotza; Attendance: 14,056; Referee: Jorge Figueroa Vázquez |

| 6 February 2022 23 | Barcelona | 4–2 | Atlético Madrid | Barcelona |
| 16:15 CET (UTC+1) | Alba 10', (yellow card) 52'; Gavi 21'; Araújo 43'; Dani Alves 49', (red card) 69'; F. de Jong (yellow card) 72' | Report | Carrasco 8'; Suárez 58'; Wass (yellow card) 89'; Herrera (yellow card) 90' | Stadium: Camp Nou; Attendance: 74,221; Referee: Jesús Gil Manzano |

| 13 February 2022 24 | Espanyol | 2–2 | Barcelona | Barcelona |
| 21:00 CET (UTC+1) | Bare (yellow card) 23'; Darder 40'; Vilhena (yellow card) 60'; De Tomás 64'; Puado (yellow card) 76'; Melamed (yellow card) 90+2' (yellow-red card) 90+3'; Morlanes (red card) 90+6' | Report | Pedri 2'; Piqué (yellow card) 74' (yellow-red card) 90+2'; García (yellow card) 78'; González (yellow card) 83'; L. de Jong 90+6' | Stadium: RCDE Stadium; Attendance: 25,049; Referee: Alejandro Hernández Hernández |

| 20 February 2022 25 | Valencia | 1–4 | Barcelona | Valencia |
| 16:15 CET (UTC+1) | Soler 53', (yellow card) 77'; Moriba (yellow card) 53'; Duro (yellow card) 56'; Lato (yellow card) 76' | Report | Aubameyang 23', 38', 63'; F. de Jong 32'; Alba (yellow card) 35'; Araújo (yellow card) 56'; González (yellow card) 72'; Dest (yellow card) 90+3' | Stadium: Mestalla; Attendance: 38,315; Referee: Carlos del Cerro Grande |

| 27 February 2022 26 | Barcelona | 4–0 | Athletic Bilbao | Barcelona |
| 21:00 CET (UTC+1) | Aubameyang 37'; Busquets (yellow card) 48'; Piqué (yellow card) 70'; Dembélé 73'; L. de Jong 90'; Depay 90+4' | Report | Balenziaga (yellow card) 54' | Stadium: Camp Nou; Attendance: 69,770; Referee: Guillermo Cuadra Fernández |

| 6 March 2022 27 | Elche | 1–2 | Barcelona | Elche |
| 16:15 CET (UTC+1) | Fidel 44'; Barragán (yellow card) 56'; Ponce (yellow card) 67'; Pastore (red card) 88' | Report | Araújo (yellow card) 49'; Dembélé (yellow card) 58'; Torres 60'; Dani Alves (yellow card) 71'; González (yellow card) 73'; Piqué (yellow card) 82'; Depay 84' (pen.), (yellow card) 90+6' | Stadium: Martínez Valero; Attendance: 30,146; Referee: Mario Melero López |

| 13 March 2022 28 | Barcelona | 4–0 | Osasuna | Barcelona |
| 21:00 CET (UTC+1) | Torres 14' (pen.), 21'; Aubameyang 27'; Puig 75' | Report | Vidal (yellow card) 13'; D. García (yellow card) 15'; U. García (yellow card) 89'; Brašanac (yellow card) 90+3' | Stadium: Camp Nou; Attendance: 54,507; Referee: Ricardo de Burgos Bengoetxea |

| 20 March 2022 29 | Real Madrid | 0–4 | Barcelona | Madrid |
| 21:00 CET (UTC+1) | Kroos (yellow card) 22'; Modrić (yellow card) 63'; Camavinga (yellow card) 82'; Vázquez (yellow card) 88' | Report | F. de Jong (yellow card) 26'; Aubameyang 29', 53'; Busquets (yellow card) 31'; Araújo 38'; Torres 47'; Alba (yellow card) 74'; González (yellow card) 88' | Stadium: Santiago Bernabéu; Attendance: 60,017; Referee: Juan Martínez Munuera |

| 3 April 2022 30 | Barcelona | 1–0 | Sevilla | Barcelona |
| 21:00 CEST (UTC+2) | Busquets (yellow card) 61'; Pedri 72'; Dembélé (yellow card) 82'; Piqué (yellow card) 85' | Report | Montiel (yellow card) 85'; Corona (yellow card) 85'; Ocampos (yellow card) 89' | Stadium: Camp Nou; Attendance: 76,112; Referee: José María Sánchez Martínez |

| 10 April 2022 31 | Levante | 2–3 | Barcelona | Valencia |
| 21:00 CEST (UTC+2) | Campaña (yellow card) 11'; Morales 52' (pen.); Roger (penalty missed) 56'; Melero 83' (pen.) | Report | Aubameyang 59'; Pedri 63'; Araújo (yellow card) 87'; L. de Jong 90+2' | Stadium: Ciutat de València; Attendance: 20,785; Referee: José Luis Munuera Montero |

| 18 April 2022 32 | Barcelona | 0–1 | Cádiz | Barcelona |
| 21:00 CEST (UTC+2) | Busquets (yellow card) 42'; Dest (yellow card) 70'; Torres (yellow card) 90+4'; Alba (yellow card) 90+8' | Report | Pérez 48'; Hernández (yellow card) 61' | Stadium: Camp Nou; Attendance: 57,495; Referee: Santiago Jaime Latre |

| 21 April 2022 33 | Real Sociedad | 0–1 | Barcelona | San Sebastián |
| 21:30 CEST (UTC+2) | Le Normand (yellow card) 90+2' | Report | Aubameyang 11'; Araújo (yellow card) 33'; Gavi (yellow card) 85' | Stadium: Anoeta; Attendance: 35,128; Referee: Carlos del Cerro Grande |

| 24 April 2022 21 | Barcelona | 0–1 | Rayo Vallecano | Barcelona |
| 21:00 CEST (UTC+2) | L. de Jong (yellow card) 81'; Dembélé (yellow card) 89'; Alba (yellow card) 90+3'; Gavi (yellow card) 90+13' | Report | Á. García 7'; Comesaña (yellow card) 37'; Balliu (yellow card) 69'; Palazón (yellow card) 86'; Hernández (yellow card) 90+5'; Trejo (yellow card) 90+6'; Catena (yellow card) 90+12' | Stadium: Camp Nou; Attendance: 57,023; Referee: Isidro Díaz de Mera Escuderos |

| 1 May 2022 34 | Barcelona | 2–1 | Mallorca | Barcelona |
| 21:00 CEST (UTC+2) | Depay 25'; Gavi (yellow card) 35'; Busquets 54'; Alba (yellow card) 90+1' | Report | Raíllo (yellow card) 63', (goal) 79'; Grenier (yellow card) 64'; Maffeo (yellow card) 90+1' | Stadium: Camp Nou; Attendance: 62,789; Referee: Pablo González Fuertes |

| 7 May 2022 35 | Real Betis | 1–2 | Barcelona | Seville |
| 21:00 CEST (UTC+2) | Bartra (yellow card) 72', (goal) 79' | Report | Busquets (yellow card) 64'; Fati 76'; Dani Alves (yellow card) 78'; Alba 90+4' | Stadium: Benito Villamarín; Attendance: 46,132; Referee: Antonio Mateu Lahoz |

| 10 May 2022 36 | Barcelona | 3–1 | Celta Vigo | Barcelona |
| 21:30 CEST (UTC+2) | Depay 30'; Aubameyang 41', 48'; García (yellow card) 80'; F. de Jong (yellow card) 90+10'; Alba (yellow card) 90+12' | Report | Aspas 50'; Murillo (red card) 58' | Stadium: Camp Nou; Attendance: 55,899; Referee: Miguel Ángel Ortiz Arias |

| 15 May 2022 37 | Getafe | 0–0 | Barcelona | Getafe |
| 19:30 CEST (UTC+2) | Olivera (yellow card) 87' | Report | Lenglet (yellow card) 35'; Busquets (yellow card) 57' | Stadium: Coliseum Alfonso Pérez; Attendance: 13,072; Referee: Jesús Gil Manzano |

| 22 May 2022 38 | Barcelona | 0–2 | Villarreal | Barcelona |
| 22:00 CEST (UTC+2) | Gavi (yellow card) 45+1'; Busquets (yellow card) 59'; Alba (yellow card) 65' | Report | Pedraza 41'; Parejo (yellow card) 45+2'; Gómez 55' | Stadium: Camp Nou; Attendance: 54,850; Referee: José Luis Munuera Montero |

=== Copa del Rey ===
| 5 January 2022 Round of 32 | Linares | 1–2 | Barcelona | Linares |
| 19:30 CET (UTC+1) | Díaz 19'; Guerrero (yellow card) 58' | Report | F. de Jong (yellow card) 58'; Dembélé 63'; Jutglà 69' | Stadium: Linarejos; Referee: Guillermo Cuadra Fernández |

| 20 January 2022 Round of 16 | Athletic Bilbao | 3–2 (a.e.t.) | Barcelona | Bilbao |
| 21:30 CET (UTC+1) | Muniain 2', 105+1' (pen.), (yellow card) 120'; D. García (yellow card) 30'; Martínez 86'; De Marcos (yellow card) 104'; I. Williams (yellow card) 119' | Report | Torres 20'; Piqué (yellow card) 76'; Pedri 90+3', (yellow card) 97'; F. de Jong (yellow card) 104'; Alba (yellow card) 105' | Stadium: San Mamés; Referee: José Luis Munuera Montero |

=== Supercopa de España ===
| 12 January 2022 Semi-finals | Barcelona | 2–3 (a.e.t.) | Real Madrid | Riyadh, Saudi Arabia |
| 22:00 SAST (UTC+3) | Torres (yellow card) 23'; L. de Jong 41'; Dani Alves (yellow card) 51'; Fati 83' | Report | Vinícius 25'; Benzema 72'; Casemiro (yellow card) 75'; Valverde 98', (yellow card) 99' | Stadium: King Fahd International Stadium; Attendance: 35,000; Referee: José Luis Munuera Montero |

=== UEFA Champions League ===
==== Group stage ====
The draw for the group stage was held on 26 August 2021.

| Pos | Team | Pld | W | D | L | GF | GA | GD | Pts | Qualification | BAY | BEN | BAR | DKV |
|---|---|---|---|---|---|---|---|---|---|---|---|---|---|---|
| 1 | (Germany) Bayern Munich | 6 | 6 | 0 | 0 | 22 | 3 | +19 | 18 | Advance to knockout phase | — | 5–2 | 3–0 | 5–0 |
| 2 | (Portugal) Benfica | 6 | 2 | 2 | 2 | 7 | 9 | −2 | 8 | Advance to knockout phase | 0–4 | — | 3–0 | 2–0 |
| 3 | (Spain) Barcelona | 6 | 2 | 1 | 3 | 2 | 9 | −7 | 7 | Transfer to Europa League | 0–3 | 0–0 | — | 1–0 |
| 4 | (Ukraine) Dynamo Kyiv | 6 | 0 | 1 | 5 | 1 | 11 | −10 | 1 | | 1–2 | 0–0 | 0–1 | — |

Source: UEFA
Rules for classification: Group stage tiebreakers

| 14 September 2021 1 | Barcelona (Spain) | 0–3 | (Germany) Bayern Munich | Barcelona, Spain |
| 21:00 CEST (UTC+2) | Gavi (yellow card) 82' | Report | Kimmich (yellow card) 5'; Müller 33'; Lewandowski 56', 85'; Upamecano (yellow card) 78' | Stadium: Camp Nou; Attendance: 39,737; Referee: Michael Oliver (England) |

| 29 September 2021 2 | Benfica (Portugal) | 3–0 | (Spain) Barcelona | Lisbon, Portugal |
| 21:00 CEST (UTC+2) | Núñez 3', 79' (pen.); Otamendi (yellow card) 33'; Silva (yellow card) 56', (goal) 69'; Grimaldo (yellow card) 62'; Weigl (yellow card) 72' | Report | Piqué (yellow card) 12'; García (yellow card) 54' (yellow-red card) 87'; Dest (yellow card) 78'; González (yellow card) 86' | Stadium: Estádio da Luz; Attendance: 29,454; Referee: Daniele Orsato (Italy) |

| 20 October 2021 3 | Barcelona (Spain) | 1–0 | (Ukraine) Dynamo Kyiv | Barcelona, Spain |
| 18:45 CEST (UTC+2) | Piqué 36'; F. de Jong (yellow card) 90' | Report | | Stadium: Camp Nou; Attendance: 45,968; Referee: Clément Turpin (France) |

| 2 November 2021 4 | Dynamo Kyiv (Ukraine) | 0–1 | (Spain) Barcelona | Kyiv, Ukraine |
| 21:00 CEST (UTC+2) | Harmash (yellow card) 41'; Buyalskyi (yellow card) 45+1' | Report | García (yellow card) 20'; Gavi (yellow card) 46'; Lenglet (yellow card) 50'; Fati 70' | Stadium: Olympic National Sports Complex; Attendance: 31,378; Referee: Ovidiu Hațegan (Romania) |

| 23 November 2021 5 | Barcelona (Spain) | 0–0 | (Portugal) Benfica | Barcelona, Spain |
| 21:00 CEST (UTC+2) | Piqué (yellow card) 49' | Report | Grimaldo (yellow card) 36'; João Mário (yellow card) 49'; Vlachodimos (yellow card) 90+2'; Taarabt (yellow card) 90+5' | Stadium: Camp Nou; Attendance: 49,572; Referee: Sergei Karasev (Russia) |

| 8 December 2021 6 | Bayern Munich (Germany) | 3–0 | (Spain) Barcelona | Munich, Germany |
| 21:00 CEST (UTC+2) | Müller 34'; Sané 43'; Musiala 62'; Richards (yellow card) 82' | Report | Busquets (yellow card) 3'; Araújo (yellow card) 16' | Stadium: Allianz Arena; Attendance: 0 Referee: Ovidiu Hațegan (Romania) |

=== UEFA Europa League ===
==== Knockout phase ====
===== Knockout round play-offs =====
The draw for the knockout round play-offs was held on 13 December 2021.

| 17 February 2022 First leg | Barcelona (Spain) | 1–1 | (Italy) Napoli | Barcelona, Spain |
| 18:45 CET (UTC+1) | Torres 59' (pen.) | Report | Zieliński 29'; Zambo Anguissa (yellow card) 39'; Fabián (yellow card) 70'; Mário Rui (yellow card) 90'; Meret (yellow card) 90+1' | Stadium: Camp Nou; Attendance: 73,525; Referee: István Kovács (Romania) |

| 24 February 2022 Second leg | Napoli (Italy) | 2–4 (3–5 agg.) | (Spain) Barcelona | Naples, Italy |
| 21:00 CET (UTC+1) | Insigne 23' (pen.); Zieliński (yellow card) 56'; Fabián (yellow card) 62'; Politano 87' | Report | Alba 8'; F. de Jong 13'; Piqué 45'; Aubameyang 59'; Gavi (yellow card) 90+3' | Stadium: Stadio Diego Armando Maradona; Attendance: 37,858; Referee: Sergei Karasev (Russia) |

===== Round of 16 =====
The draw for the round of 16 was held on 25 February 2022.

| 10 March 2022 First leg | Barcelona (Spain) | 0–0 | (Turkey) Galatasaray | Barcelona, Spain |
| 21:00 CET (UTC+1) | Depay (yellow card) 35'; Alba (yellow card) 89' | Report | Kutlu (yellow card) 31'; Antalyalı (yellow card) 77' | Stadium: Camp Nou; Attendance: 61,740; Referee: Benoît Bastien (France) |

| 17 March 2022 Second leg | Galatasaray (Turkey) | 1–2 (1–2 agg.) | (Spain) Barcelona | Istanbul, Turkey |
| 18:45 CET (UTC+1) | Marcão 28', (yellow card) 30'; Van Aanholt (yellow card) 72'; Bayram (yellow card) 90' | Report | Busquets (yellow card) 27'; Pedri 37'; García (yellow card) 42'; Aubameyang 49'; Gavi (yellow card) 79'; Alba (yellow card) 87' | Stadium: Ali Sami Yen Spor Kompleksi; Attendance: 50,110; Referee: Daniele Orsato (Italy) |

===== Quarter-finals =====
The draw for the quarter-finals was held on 18 March 2022.

| 7 April 2022 First leg | Eintracht Frankfurt (Germany) | 1–1 | (Spain) Barcelona | Frankfurt, Germany |
| 21:00 CEST (UTC+2) | Kostić (yellow card) 45+2'; Knauff 48'; Tuta (yellow card) 61' (yellow-red card) 78'; Jakić (yellow card) 82' | Report | Torres 61' | Stadium: Waldstadion; Attendance: 48,000; Referee: Srđan Jovanović (Serbia) |

| 14 April 2022 Second leg | Barcelona (Spain) | 2–3 (3–4 agg.) | (Germany) Eintracht Frankfurt | Barcelona, Spain |
| 21:00 CEST (UTC+2) | García (yellow card) 3'; Gavi (yellow card) 28'; Busquets 90+1'; Dembélé (yellow card) 90+4'; Depay 90+11' (pen.) | Report | Kostić 4' (pen.), 67'; Jakić (yellow card) 24'; Borré 36'; Hrustic (yellow card) 83'; Ndicka (yellow card) 90+5' (yellow-red card) 90+10'; Knauff (yellow card) 90+5'; Trapp (yellow card) 90+11' | Stadium: Camp Nou; Attendance: 79,468; Referee: Artur Soares Dias (Portugal) |

== Statistics ==
=== Squad statistics ===
As of 22 May 2022

| No. | Pos | Nat | Player | Total | | La Liga | | Copa del Rey | | Supercopa de España | | UEFA Champions League | | UEFA Europa League | |
| No. | Pos | Nat | Player | Apps | Goals | Apps | Goals | Apps | Goals | Apps | Goals | Apps | Goals | Apps | Goals |
Goalkeepers
| 1 | GK | (Germany) GER | Marc-André ter Stegen | 49 | 0 | 35 | 0 | 1 | 0 | 1 | 0 | 6 | 0 | 6 | 0 |
| 13 | GK | (Brazil) BRA | Neto | 4 | 0 | 3 | 0 | 1 | 0 | 0 | 0 | 0 | 0 | 0 | 0 |
Defenders
| 2 | DF | (United States) USA | Sergiño Dest | 31 | 0 | 17+4 | 0 | 0+1 | 0 | 0 | 0 | 3+1 | 0 | 3+2 | 0 |
| 3 | DF | (Spain) ESP | Gerard Piqué | 40 | 3 | 25+2 | 1 | 2 | 0 | 1 | 0 | 5 | 1 | 4+1 | 1 |
| 4 | DF | (Uruguay) URU | Ronald Araújo | 43 | 4 | 25+5 | 4 | 2 | 0 | 1 | 0 | 4+1 | 0 | 4+1 | 0 |
| 8 | DF | (Brazil) BRA | Dani Alves | 17 | 1 | 13+1 | 1 | 2 | 0 | 1 | 0 | 0 | 0 | 0 | 0 |
| 15 | DF | (France) FRA | Clément Lenglet | 27 | 0 | 7+14 | 0 | 0 | 0 | 0 | 0 | 4 | 0 | 0+2 | 0 |
| 18 | DF | (Spain) ESP | Jordi Alba | 44 | 3 | 30 | 2 | 2 | 0 | 1 | 0 | 5 | 0 | 6 | 1 |
| 22 | DF | (Spain) ESP | Óscar Mingueza | 27 | 0 | 9+10 | 0 | 1 | 0 | 0 | 0 | 2+3 | 0 | 2 | 0 |
| 23 | DF | (France) FRA | Samuel Umtiti | 1 | 0 | 1 | 0 | 0 | 0 | 0 | 0 | 0 | 0 | 0 | 0 |
| 24 | DF | (Spain) ESP | Eric García | 36 | 0 | 23+3 | 0 | 1 | 0 | 0 | 0 | 3+1 | 0 | 5 | 0 |
| 31 | DF | (Spain) ESP | Alejandro Balde | 7 | 0 | 2+3 | 0 | 0 | 0 | 0 | 0 | 0+2 | 0 | 0 | 0 |
| 41 | DF | (Spain) ESP | Mika Màrmol | 1 | 0 | 0+1 | 0 | 0 | 0 | 0 | 0 | 0 | 0 | 0 | 0 |
Midfielders
| 5 | MF | (Spain) ESP | Sergio Busquets | 51 | 3 | 36 | 2 | 2 | 0 | 1 | 0 | 6 | 0 | 4+2 | 1 |
| 6 | MF | (Spain) ESP | Riqui Puig | 18 | 1 | 2+13 | 1 | 1 | 0 | 0 | 0 | 0+1 | 0 | 0+1 | 0 |
| 14 | MF | (Spain) ESP | Nico González | 37 | 2 | 12+15 | 2 | 2 | 0 | 0+1 | 0 | 2+2 | 0 | 2+1 | 0 |
| 16 | MF | (Spain) ESP | Pedri | 22 | 5 | 10+2 | 3 | 0+1 | 1 | 0+1 | 0 | 2 | 0 | 6 | 1 |
| 20 | MF | (Spain) ESP | Sergi Roberto | 12 | 2 | 4+5 | 2 | 0 | 0 | 0 | 0 | 2+1 | 0 | 0 | 0 |
| 21 | MF | (Netherlands) NED | Frenkie de Jong | 47 | 4 | 30+2 | 3 | 0+2 | 0 | 1 | 0 | 6 | 0 | 4+2 | 1 |
| 30 | MF | (Spain) ESP | Gavi | 47 | 2 | 28+6 | 2 | 1 | 0 | 1 | 0 | 4+2 | 0 | 2+3 | 0 |
| 34 | MF | (Spain) ESP | Álvaro Sanz | 3 | 0 | 0+2 | 0 | 0+1 | 0 | 0 | 0 | 0 | 0 | 0 | 0 |
Forwards
| 7 | FW | (France) FRA | Ousmane Dembélé | 32 | 2 | 15+6 | 1 | 0+1 | 1 | 1 | 0 | 1+2 | 0 | 1+5 | 0 |
| 9 | FW | (Netherlands) NED | Memphis Depay | 38 | 13 | 20+8 | 12 | 0 | 0 | 0+1 | 0 | 6 | 0 | 1+2 | 1 |
| 10 | FW | (Spain) ESP | Ansu Fati | 15 | 6 | 3+7 | 4 | 0+1 | 0 | 0+1 | 1 | 1+2 | 1 | 0 | 0 |
| 11 | FW | (Spain) ESP | Adama Traoré | 17 | 0 | 4+7 | 0 | 0 | 0 | 0 | 0 | 0 | 0 | 5+1 | 0 |
| 12 | FW | (Denmark) DEN | Martin Braithwaite | 5 | 2 | 3+1 | 2 | 0+1 | 0 | 0 | 0 | 0 | 0 | 0 | 0 |
| 17 | FW | (Netherlands) NED | Luuk de Jong | 29 | 7 | 6+15 | 6 | 0 | 0 | 1 | 1 | 3 | 0 | 0+4 | 0 |
| 19 | FW | (Spain) ESP | Ferran Torres | 26 | 7 | 17+1 | 4 | 1 | 1 | 1 | 0 | 0 | 0 | 6 | 2 |
| 25 | FW | (Gabon) GAB | Pierre-Emerick Aubameyang | 23 | 13 | 13+4 | 11 | 0 | 0 | 0 | 0 | 0 | 0 | 5+1 | 2 |
| 29 | FW | (Spain) ESP | Ferran Jutglà | 9 | 2 | 4+2 | 1 | 2 | 1 | 0+1 | 0 | 0 | 0 | 0 | 0 |
| 33 | FW | (Morocco) MAR | Abde Ezzalzouli | 12 | 1 | 6+4 | 1 | 1 | 0 | 0+1 | 0 | 0 | 0 | 0 | 0 |
| 37 | FW | (Spain) ESP | Ilias Akhomach | 3 | 0 | 2 | 0 | 1 | 0 | 0 | 0 | 0 | 0 | 0 | 0 |
| 39 | FW | (Spain) ESP | Estanis Pedrola | 1 | 0 | 0+1 | 0 | 0 | 0 | 0 | 0 | 0 | 0 | 0 | 0 |
Players who have made an appearance or had a squad number this season but have left the club
| 22 | DF | (Brazil) BRA | Emerson Royal | 3 | 0 | 1+2 | 0 | 0 | 0 | 0 | 0 | 0 | 0 | 0 | 0 |
| 7 | FW | (France) FRA | Antoine Griezmann | 3 | 0 | 3 | 0 | 0 | 0 | 0 | 0 | 0 | 0 | 0 | 0 |
| 8 | MF | (Bosnia and Herzegovina) BIH | Miralem Pjanić | 0 | 0 | 0 | 0 | 0 | 0 | 0 | 0 | 0 | 0 | 0 | 0 |
| 19 | FW | (Argentina) ARG | Sergio Agüero | 5 | 1 | 2+2 | 1 | 0 | 0 | 0 | 0 | 0+1 | 0 | 0 | 0 |
| 14 | MF | (Brazil) BRA | Philippe Coutinho | 16 | 2 | 5+7 | 2 | 0 | 0 | 0 | 0 | 0+4 | 0 | 0 | 0 |
| 11 | FW | (Austria) AUT | Yusuf Demir | 9 | 0 | 2+4 | 0 | 0 | 0 | 0 | 0 | 1+2 | 0 | 0 | 0 |

=== Goalscorers ===
As of 22 May 2022

| Rank | No. | Pos. | Nat. | Player | La Liga | Copa del Rey | Supercopa de España | Champions League | Europa League | Total |
|---|---|---|---|---|---|---|---|---|---|---|
| 1 | 9 | FW | (Netherlands) | Memphis Depay | 12 | 0 | 0 | 0 | 1 | 13 |
| 1 | 25 | FW | (Gabon) | Pierre-Emerick Aubameyang | 11 | 0 | 0 | 0 | 2 | 13 |
| 3 | 17 | FW | (Netherlands) | Luuk de Jong | 6 | 0 | 1 | 0 | 0 | 7 |
| 3 | 19 | FW | (Spain) | Ferran Torres | 4 | 1 | 0 | 0 | 2 | 7 |
| 5 | 10 | FW | (Spain) | Ansu Fati | 4 | 0 | 1 | 1 | 0 | 6 |
| 6 | 16 | MF | (Spain) | Pedri | 3 | 1 | 0 | 0 | 1 | 5 |
| 7 | 4 | DF | (Uruguay) | Ronald Araújo | 4 | 0 | 0 | 0 | 0 | 4 |
| 7 | 21 | MF | (Netherlands) | Frenkie de Jong | 3 | 0 | 0 | 0 | 1 | 4 |
| 9 | 3 | DF | (Spain) | Gerard Piqué | 1 | 0 | 0 | 1 | 1 | 3 |
| 9 | 5 | MF | (Spain) | Sergio Busquets | 2 | 0 | 0 | 0 | 1 | 3 |
| 9 | 18 | DF | (Spain) | Jordi Alba | 2 | 0 | 0 | 0 | 1 | 3 |
| 12 | 7 | FW | (France) | Ousmane Dembélé | 1 | 1 | 0 | 0 | 0 | 2 |
| 12 | 12 | FW | (Denmark) | Martin Braithwaite | 2 | 0 | 0 | 0 | 0 | 2 |
| 12 | 14 | MF | (Spain) | Nico González | 2 | 0 | 0 | 0 | 0 | 2 |
| 12 | 20 | MF | (Spain) | Sergi Roberto | 2 | 0 | 0 | 0 | 0 | 2 |
| 12 | 29 | FW | (Spain) | Ferran Jutglà | 1 | 1 | 0 | 0 | 0 | 2 |
| 12 | 30 | MF | (Spain) | Gavi | 2 | 0 | 0 | 0 | 0 | 2 |
| 12 | ~~14~~ | MF | (Brazil) | Philippe Coutinho | 2 | 0 | 0 | 0 | 0 | 2 |
| 19 | 6 | MF | (Spain) | Riqui Puig | 1 | 0 | 0 | 0 | 0 | 1 |
| 19 | 8 | DF | (Brazil) | Dani Alves | 1 | 0 | 0 | 0 | 0 | 1 |
| 19 | 33 | FW | (Morocco) | Abde Ezzalzouli | 1 | 0 | 0 | 0 | 0 | 1 |
| 19 | ~~19~~ | FW | (Argentina) | Sergio Agüero | 1 | 0 | 0 | 0 | 0 | 1 |
| Own goals | | | | | 0 | 0 | 0 | 0 | 0 | 0 |
| Totals | | | | | 68 | 4 | 2 | 2 | 10 | 86 |

=== Hat-tricks ===
| Player | Against | Result | Date | Competition | Ref |
|---|---|---|---|---|---|
| (Gabon) Pierre-Emerick Aubameyang | (Spain) Valencia | 4–1 (A) | 20 February 2022 | La Liga | |

(H) – Home; (A) – Away

=== Disciplinary record ===
As of 22 May 2022

| N | P | Nat. | Name | La Liga | | | Copa del Rey | | | Supercopa de España | | | Champions League | | | Europa League | | | Total | | | Notes |
| N | P | Nat. | Name | Yellow card | Second yellow card | Red card | Yellow card | Second yellow card | Red card | Yellow card | Second yellow card | Red card | Yellow card | Second yellow card | Red card | Yellow card | Second yellow card | Red card | Yellow card | Second yellow card | Red card | Notes |
| 1 | GK | (Germany) | Marc-André ter Stegen | 3 | | | | | | | | | | | | | | | 3 | | | |
| 2 | DF | (United States) | Sergiño Dest | 2 | | | | | | | | | 1 | | | | | | 3 | | | |
| 3 | DF | (Spain) | Gerard Piqué | 8 | 1 | | 1 | | | | | | 2 | | | | | | 11 | 1 | | |
| 4 | DF | (Uruguay) | Ronald Araújo | 6 | | | | | | | | | 1 | | | | | | 7 | | | |
| 5 | MF | (Spain) | Sergio Busquets | 11 | | | | | | | | | 1 | | | 1 | | | 13 | | | |
| 7 | FW | (France) | Ousmane Dembélé | 3 | | | | | | | | | | | | 1 | | | 4 | | | |
| 8 | DF | (Brazil) | Dani Alves | 2 | | 1 | | | | 1 | | | | | | | | | 3 | | 1 | |
| 9 | FW | (Netherlands) | Memphis Depay | 3 | | | | | | | | | | | | | | | 3 | | | |
| 14 | MF | (Spain) | Nico González | 6 | | | | | | | | | 1 | | | | | | 7 | | | |
| 15 | DF | (France) | Clément Lenglet | 3 | | | | | | | | | 1 | | | | | | 4 | | | |
| 16 | MF | (Spain) | Pedri | | | | 1 | | | | | | | | | | | | 1 | | | |
| 17 | FW | (Netherlands) | Luuk de Jong | 1 | | | | | | | | | | | | | | | 1 | | | |
| 18 | DF | (Spain) | Jordi Alba | 11 | | | 1 | | | | | | | | | 1 | | | 13 | | | |
| 19 | DF | (Spain) | Ferran Torres | 1 | | | | | | 1 | | | | | | | | | 2 | | | |
| 20 | MF | (Spain) | Sergi Roberto | 1 | | | | | | | | | | | | | | | 1 | | | |
| 21 | MF | (Netherlands) | Frenkie de Jong | 5 | 1 | | 2 | | | | | | 1 | | | | | | 8 | 1 | | |
| 22 | DF | (Spain) | Óscar Mingueza | 2 | | | | | | | | | | | | | | | 2 | | | |
| 23 | DF | (France) | Samuel Umtiti | 1 | | | | | | | | | | | | | | | 1 | | | |
| 24 | DF | (Spain) | Eric García | 5 | | 1 | | | | | | | 2 | 1 | | 2 | | | 9 | 1 | 1 | |
| 29 | FW | (Spain) | Ferran Jutglà | 1 | | | | | | | | | | | | | | | 1 | | | |
| 30 | MF | (Spain) | Gavi | 9 | 1 | | | | | | | | 2 | | | 3 | | | 14 | 1 | | |
| 33 | FW | (Morocco) | Abde Ezzalzouli | 4 | | | | | | | | | | | | | | | 4 | | | |
| ~~14~~ | MF | (Brazil) | Philippe Coutinho | 1 | | | | | | | | | | | | | | | 1 | | | |

Source: fcbarcelona.com
Ordered by (red card) , (second yellow card) and (yellow card)
(yellow card) = Number of bookings; (second yellow card) = Number of sending offs after a second yellow card; (red card) = Number of sending offs by a direct red card.

=== Injury record ===
| N | P | Nat. | Name | Type | Status | Source | Match | Inj. Date | Ret. Date |
| 10 | FW | (Spain) | Ansu Fati | meniscus tear in left knee | | FCB.com | 2020–21 season | 7 November 2020 | 26 September 2021 |
| 14 | MF | (Brazil) | Philippe Coutinho | left knee injury | | FCB.com | 2020–21 season | 29 December 2020 | 14 September 2021 |
| 1 | GK | (Germany) | Marc-Andre ter Stegen | right knee injury | | FCB.com | 2020–21 season | 21 May 2021 | 28 August 2021 |
| 7 | FW | (France) | Ousmane Dembélé | right knee injury | | FCB.com | vs Hungary with France | 19 June 2021 | 1 November 2021 |
| 15 | DF | (France) | Clément Lenglet | right knee injury | | FCB.com | in training | Pre-Season | 15 August 2021 |
| 19 | FW | (Argentina) | Sergio Agüero | right calf injury | | FCB.com | in training | Pre-Season | 17 October 2021 |
| 22 | DF | (Spain) | Óscar Mingueza | left hamstring injury | | FCB.com | vs Ivory Coast with Spain Olympic | Pre-Season | 28 August 2021 |
| 3 | DF | (Spain) | Gerard Piqué | left calf injury | | FCB.com | vs Athletic Bilbao | 21 August 2021 | 14 September 2021 |
| 20 | MF | (Spain) | Sergi Roberto | fractured rib | | FCB.com | vs Getafe | 29 August 2021 | 14 September 2021 |
| 12 | FW | (Denmark) | Martin Braithwaite | left knee problem | | FCB.com | vs Getafe | 29 August 2021 | 20 January 2022 |
| 2 | DF | (United States) | Sergiño Dest | right ankle problem | | FCB.com | vs Canada with United States | 5 September 2021 | 14 September 2021 |
| 18 | DF | (Spain) | Jordi Alba | right hamstring injury | | FCB.com | vs Bayern Munich | 14 September 2021 | 2 October 2021 |
| 16 | MF | (Spain) | Pedri | left thigh injury | | FCB.com | vs Bayern Munich | 14 September 2021 | 29 September 2021 |
| 16 | MF | (Spain) | Pedri | left thigh injury | | FCB.com | in training | 1 October 2021 | 10 January 2022 |
| 4 | DF | (Uruguay) | Ronald Araujo | right hamstring injury | | FCB.com | vs Argentina with Uruguay | 11 October 2021 | 1 November 2021 |
| 21 | MF | (Netherlands) | Frenkie de Jong | right hamstring strain | | FCB.com | vs Real Madrid | 24 October 2021 | 1 November 2021 |
| 10 | FW | (Spain) | Ansu Fati | right knee injury | | FCB.com | vs Real Madrid | 24 October 2021 | 1 November 2021 |
| 20 | MF | (Spain) | Sergi Roberto | right quadricep injury | | FCB.com | in training | 29 October 2021 | 20 November 2021 |
| 19 | MF | (Argentina) | Sergio Agüero | chest pain | | FCB.com | vs Alavés | 30 October 2021 | Retired |
| 3 | MF | (Spain) | Gerard Piqué | right calf strain | | FCB.com | vs Alavés | 30 October 2021 | 20 November 2021 |
| 7 | FW | (France) | Ousmane Dembélé | left hamstring strain | | FCB.com | in training | 4 November 2021 | 23 November 2021 |
| 2 | DF | (United States) | Sergiño Dest | lower back pain | | FCB.com | in training | 4 November 2021 | 23 November 2021 |
| 10 | FW | (Spain) | Ansu Fati | left thigh injury | | FCB.com | vs Celta Vigo | 6 November 2021 | 11 January 2022 |
| 24 | DF | (Spain) | Eric García | right calf strain | | FCB.com | vs Celta Vigo | 6 November 2021 | 20 November 2021 |
| 28 | FW | (Spain) | Nico González | left groin strain | | FCB.com | vs Celta Vigo | 6 November 2021 | 20 November 2021 |
| 20 | MF | (Spain) | Sergi Roberto | right quadricep injury | | FCB.com | in training | 22 November 2021 | |
| 18 | DF | (Spain) | Jordi Alba | right hamstring injury | | FCB.com | vs Bayern Munich | 8 December 2021 | 18 December 2021 |
| 9 | FW | (Netherlands) | Memphis Depay | left hamstring injury | | FCB.com | vs Bayern Munich | 8 December 2021 | 8 January 2022 |
| 2 | DF | (United States) | Sergiño Dest | groin injury | | FCB.com | in training | 18 December 2021 | 8 January 2022 |
| 15 | DF | (France) | Clément Lenglet | stomach bug | | FCB.com | in training | 5 January 2022 | 8 January 2022 |
| 23 | DF | (France) | Samuel Umtiti | stomach bug | | FCB.com | in training | 5 January 2022 | 8 January 2022 |
| 4 | DF | (Uruguay) | Ronald Araujo | right hand fractured metacarpal | | FCB.com | vs Linares Deportivo | 5 January 2022 | 11 January 2022 |
| 21 | MF | (Netherlands) | Frenkie de Jong | left calf injury | | FCB.com | vs Linares Deportivo | 5 January 2022 | 11 January 2022 |
| 24 | DF | (Spain) | Eric García | right hamstring injury | | FCB.com | vs Granada | 8 January 2022 | 13 February 2022 |
| 23 | DF | (France) | Samuel Umtiti | right foot fractured metacarpal | | FCB.com | in training | 17 January 2022 | 1 May 2022 |
| 9 | FW | (Netherlands) | Memphis Depay | hamstring injury | | FCB.com | in training | 19 January 2022 | 27 February 2022 |
| 10 | FW | (Spain) | Ansu Fati | left thigh injury | | FCB.com | vs Athletic Club | 20 January 2022 | 1 May 2022 |
| 15 | DF | (France) | Clément Lenglet | left hamstring injury | | FCB.com | in training | 3 February 2022 | 27 February 2022 |
| 4 | DF | (Uruguay) | Ronald Araujo | left soleus muscle | | FCB.com | vs Espanyol | 13 February 2022 | 19 February 2022 |
| 2 | DF | (United States) | Sergiño Dest | left hamstring injury | | FCB.com | vs Galatasaray | 6 March 2022 | 13 April 2022 |
| 9 | FW | (Netherlands) | Memphis Depay | hamstring injury | | FCB.com | in training | 6 April 2022 | 13 April 2022 |
| 3 | DF | (Spain) | Gerard Piqué | groin injury | | FCB.com | vs Eintracht Frankfurt | 7 April 2022 | 20 April 2022 |
| 16 | MF | (Spain) | Pedri | left thigh injury | | FCB.com | vs Eintracht Frankfurt | 14 April 2022 | |
| 2 | DF | (United States) | Sergiño Dest | right hamstring injury | | FCB.com | vs Rayo Vallecano | 24 April 2022 | |
| 14 | MF | (Spain) | Nico González | fractured left toe | | FCB.com | in training | 29 April 2022 | |
| 3 | DF | (Spain) | Gerard Piqué | left thigh injury | | FCB.com | in training | 5 May 2022 | |
| 1 | GK | (Germany) | Marc-Andre ter Stegen | Stomach bug | | FCB.com | in training | 6 May 2022 | 10 May 2022 |
| 24 | DF | (Spain) | Eric García | right thumb injury | | FCB.com | in training | 12 May 2022 | |

- Player is injured
- Player has recovered from injury
Last updated: 7 May 2022
Source: FC Barcelona
