= Gavi (footballer) =

Spanish footballer (born 2004)

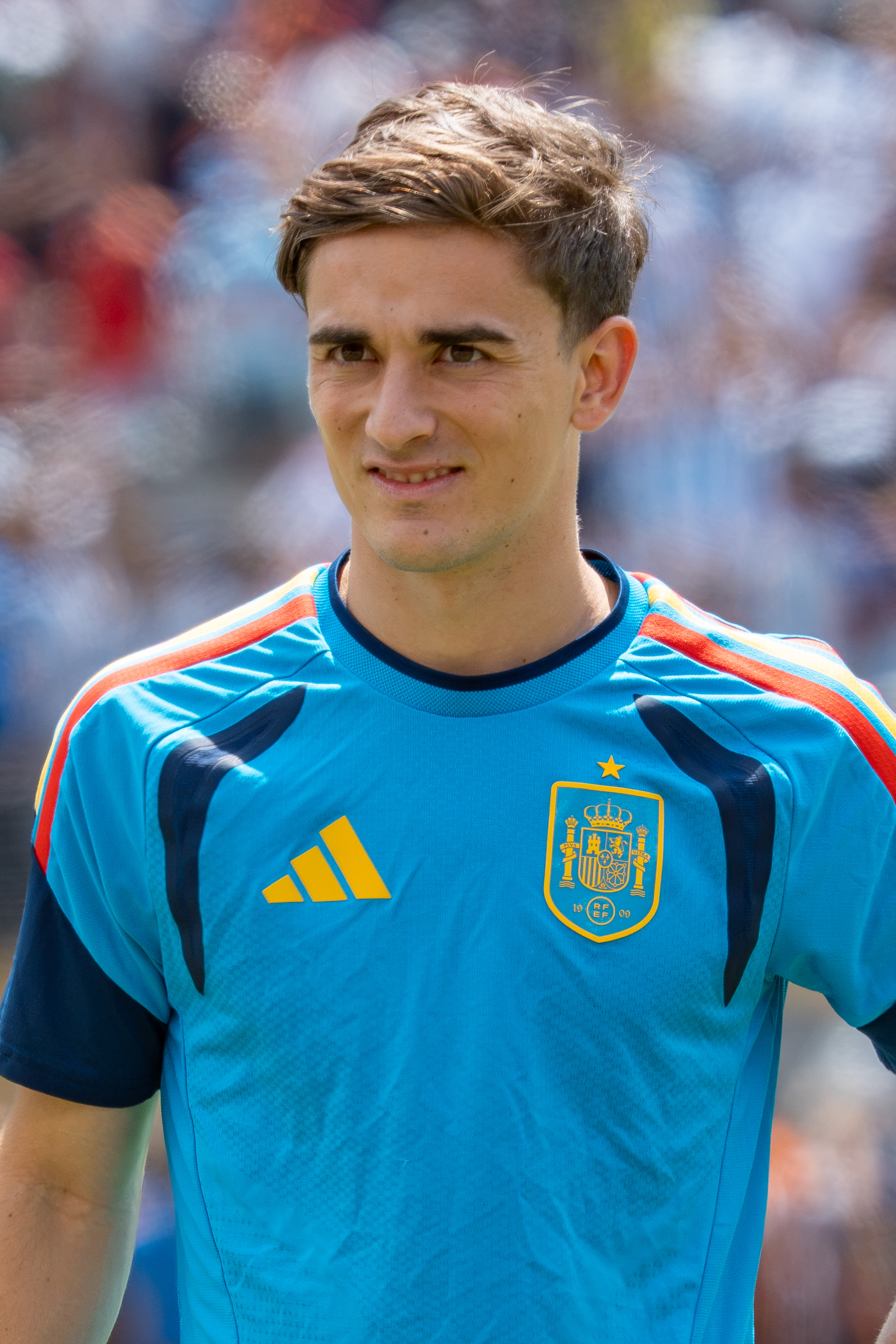
- Gavi with Spain in 2026

Personal information
- Full name: Pablo Martín Páez Gavira
- Date of birth: 5 August 2004 (age 22)
- Place of birth: Los Palacios y Villafranca, Spain
- Height: 1.74 m (5 ft 9 in)
- Position: Central midfielder

Team information
- Current team: Barcelona
- Number: 6

Youth career
- 2010–2013: La Liara Balompié
- 2013–2015: Betis
- 2015–2021: Barcelona

Senior career*
Years	Team	Apps	(Gls)
2021	Barcelona B	3	(0)
2021–	Barcelona	125	(6)

International career^{‡}
2018–2020	Spain U15	4	(1)
2019–2020	Spain U16	7	(0)
2020–2021	Spain U18	3	(0)
2021–	Spain	32	(5)
Medal record
Men's football
Representing Spain
FIFA World Cup
Winner	2026 Canada–Mexico–US
UEFA Nations League
Winner	2023 Netherlands
Runner-up	2021 Italy
Runner-up	2025 Germany
- * Club domestic league appearances and goals as of 22:48, 22 November 2026 (UTC) ‡ National team caps and goals as of 3 July 2026

Pablo Martín Páez Gavira (Note: Spanish pronunciation: [ˈpaβlo maɾˈtim ˈpaeθ ɣaˈβiɾa];) (born 5 August 2004), known as Gavi, (Note: pronounced [ˈɡaβi]) is a Spanish professional footballer who plays as a central midfielder for La Liga club Barcelona and the Spain national team.

== Early life ==
Gavi was born in Los Palacios y Villafranca, Sevilla, Andalusia.

== Club career ==
=== Early career ===
Gavi started his career at La Liara Balompié, a club in his hometown, where he spent two years, between 2010 and 2012. From there he moved on to Real Betis's youth academy, where he spent two seasons. He scored 95 goals for their youth team.

=== Barcelona ===
==== Youth career ====
In 2015, at the age of 11, he signed for Barcelona.

In September 2020, he signed his first professional contract with the Catalan club, and was promoted directly from the under-16 team to the under-19 team. He made his debut for Barcelona B on 21 February 2021, in the 6–0 home routing of L'Hospitalet, coming on as a substitute for Nico González in the 77th minute. He made his first start for Barça B the following 14 March in a 1–0 derby win against Espanyol B at the Ciutat Esportiva Dani Jarque.

==== 2021–22 season ====
Having featured twice for Barcelona B in the 2020–21 season, Gavi was promoted to the senior squad for pre-season friendlies with the first team ahead of the start of the new season. After good performances in wins against Gimnàstic de Tarragona and Girona, Gavi was reported to have pushed ahead of Riqui Puig in manager Ronald Koeman's squad selection. He continued this good run of form in a 3–0 win against German opposition VfB Stuttgart, earning comparisons with Barcelona legend Xavi.

On 29 August 2021, he played his first official match for Barcelona's first team in the 2–1 La Liga win over Getafe, replacing Sergi Roberto in the 73rd minute. On 18 December, he scored his first goal for the club and provided an assist in the 3–2 home win over Elche.

==== 2022–23 season ====
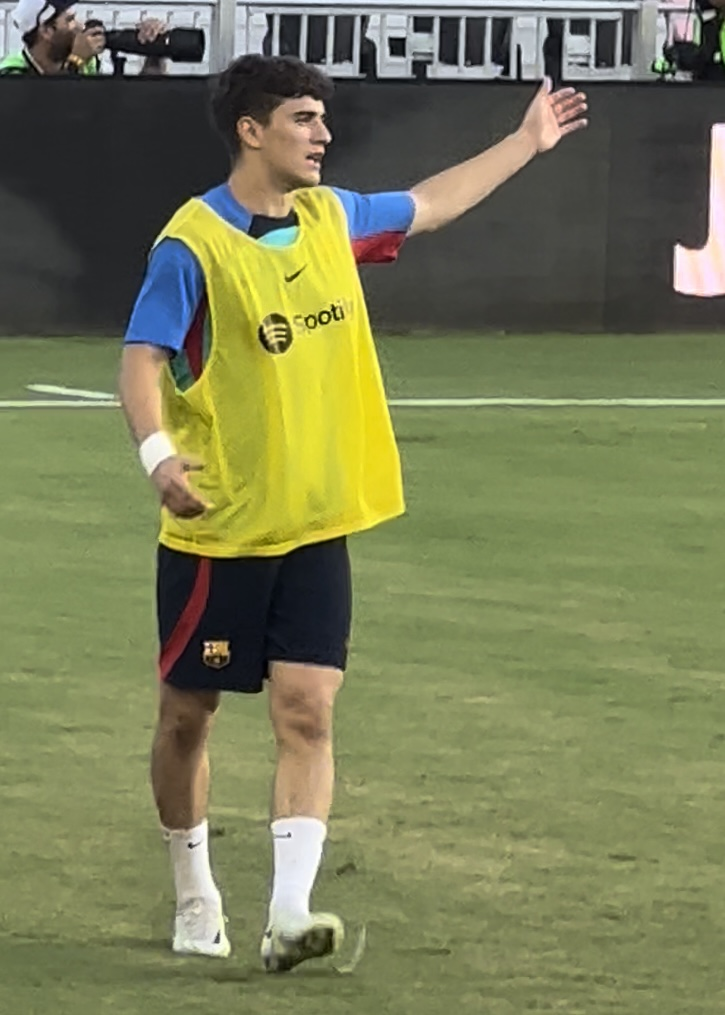
Gavi in 2022

On 15 January 2023, Gavi scored a goal and provided two assists to be named man of the match in a 3–1 victory over Real Madrid in the Supercopa de España Final. On 31 January, a Spanish court ruled in favor of accepting Gavi's new contract with Barcelona until 2026, signed in September the previous year, despite opposition from La Liga president Javier Tebas who argued that the new deal would not fit in the club's salary limit that season. On the same day, Barcelona announced that Gavi would acquire the number 6 shirt, previously worn by his coach and Barcelona legend, Xavi. On 21 March, a court ruling ordered that the new deal to be revoked as it would exceed the club's salary limit, and a return to his previous enrolment as a youth-team player with his old number 30 shirt.

On 20 June 2023, Barcelona managed to complete Gavi's registration to La Liga as a first-team player, subsequently extended his contract with Barcelona until June 2026, which contained a release clause of €1bn.

==== 2023–present ====
Having been injured since November 2023, Gavi came back to training on 12 September 2024. After 348 days since his injury, he made his return to action on 20 October 2024 in a 5–1 victory against Sevilla, replacing his teammate Pedri who handed him the captain's armband. Similarly, he also made an appearance in El Clásico as a substitute once again on 26 October 2024 where Barcelona won comfortably by 4–0 against Real Madrid in the Bernabéu. He picked up a yellow card in the 90th minute following a clash with Vinicius Jr. He scored his first goal of the season against Athletic Bilbao in the Supercopa de España semi final tie where he also assisted teammate Lamine Yamal in a 2–0 victory and eventually winning the cup. On 31 January 2025, he extended his contract with the club until 2030.

Gavi featured in the first two matches of Barcelona's opening La Liga matches of the 2025–26 season as a substitute, after which suffered a medial meniscus injury to his right knee and underwent surgery in early September 2025, ruling him out for an extended period of around four to five months. He was cleared to return to the squad in mid-March 2026.

== International career ==
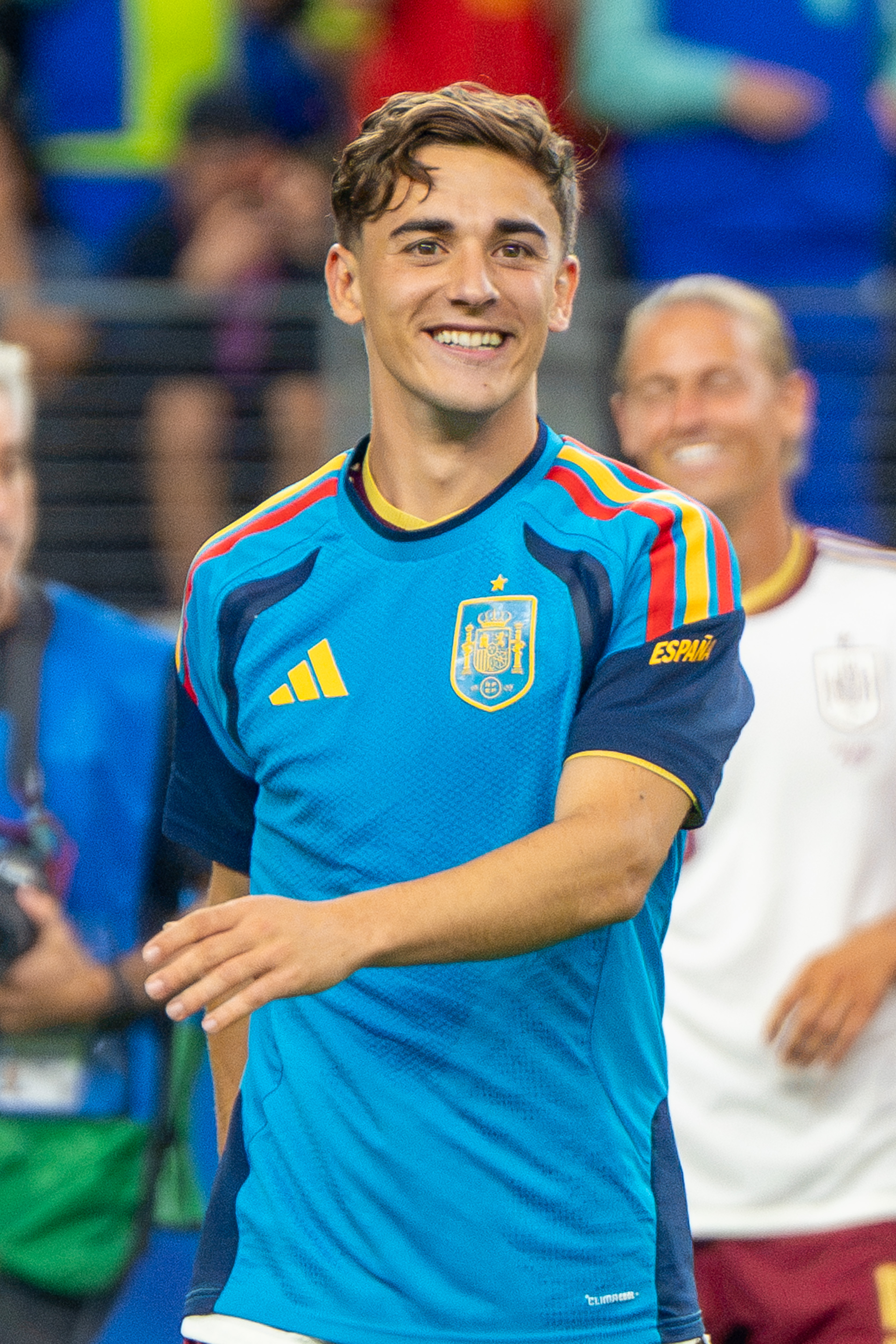
Gavi with Spain in 2026

Gavi has represented Spain at under-15 and under-16 level.

On 30 September 2021, Gavi received a surprise call-up to the senior Spain national team by the manager Luis Enrique. He made his debut in their UEFA Nations League semi-final win against Italy on 6 October, becoming the youngest player to ever represent Spain at senior level. In the final against France on 10 October, Spain ultimately suffered a 2–1 defeat. On 5 June 2022, he scored his first senior goal in the Nations League away against the Czech Republic, becoming the youngest player to ever score representing Spain at senior level.

Gavi was named in Spain's squad for the 2022 FIFA World Cup in Qatar, in which he started in all four matches. With his goal against Costa Rica in Spain's first game of the tournament, Gavi became the third youngest player (only behind Pelé and Manuel Rosas) to score in a World Cup match.

On 15 October 2023, Gavi scored the only goal in a 1–0 away win over Norway during the Euro 2024 qualifying, securing his national team's qualification to the major tournament. A month later, on 19 November, he sustained an ACL injury in his right knee and a damaged meniscus during a UEFA Euro 2024 qualifying match against Georgia, which would force him to miss both the Euro 2024 finals and the 2024 Olympic Games for Spain.

On 25 May 2026, Gavi was named in Spain's squad for the 2026 FIFA World Cup. He only made two appearances throughout the tournament, starting in Spain's opening match – a 0–0 draw against Cape Verde – and coming on as a late substitute in a 3–0 win over Austria in the round of 32; Spain went on to win the title with a 1–0 extra-time victory over defending champions Argentina in the final.

== Style of play ==
Graham Hunter of ESPN hailed Gavi as a highly promising young player in 2021, comparing him to former Barcelona midfielders Xavi and Andrés Iniesta due to his dribbling, anticipation, intelligence, vision, passing, first touch, close control, change of pace, and quick reflexes. Following his performance in Spain's semi-final victory over Italy in the 2021 Nations League Finals, Italian defender Emerson Palmieri described Gavi as a player who "has huge potential".

Coach Hansi Flick has deployed Gavi in multiple midfield roles during 2025–26, leveraging his defensive work rate, pressing intensity, and technical ability to adapt to various tactical setups.

== Career statistics ==
=== Club ===
As of match played 22 November 2026

Appearances and goals by club, season and competition
Club	Season	League			Copa del Rey		Europe		Other		Total	
Club	Season	Division	Apps	Goals	Apps	Goals	Apps	Goals	Apps	Goals	Apps	Goals
Barcelona B	2020–21	Segunda División B	2	0	—		—		—		2	0
Barcelona B	2021–22	Primera División RFEF	1	0	—		—		—		1	0
Barcelona B	Total		3	0	—		—		—		3	0
Barcelona	2021–22	La Liga	34	2	1	0	11 (Note: Six appearances in UEFA Champions League, five appearances in UEFA Europa League)	0	1 (Note: Appearance(s) in Supercopa de España)	0	47	2
Barcelona	2022–23	La Liga	36	2	5	0	6 (Note: Five appearances in UEFA Champions League, one appearance in UEFA Europa League)	0	2	1	49	3
Barcelona	2023–24	La Liga	12	1	0	0	3 (Note: Appearances in UEFA Champions League)	1	0	0	15	2
Barcelona	2024–25	La Liga	26	1	4	1	10	0	2	1	42	3
Barcelona	2025–26	La Liga	11	0	0	0	2	0	0	0	13	0
Barcelona	2026–27	La Liga	6	0	0	0	4	0	0	0	10	0
Barcelona	Total		125	6	10	1	36	1	5	2	176	10
Career total			128	6	10	1	36	1	5	2	179	10

=== International ===
As of match played 2 July 2026

Appearances and goals by national team and year
National team	Year	Apps	Goals
Spain	2021	4	0
Spain	2022	13	3
Spain	2023	10	2
Spain	2024	0	0
Spain	2025	1	0
Spain	2026	4	0
Total		32	5

As of match played 2 July 2026
Spain score listed first, score column indicates score after each Gavi goal

List of international goals scored by Gavi
No.	Date	Venue	Cap	Opponent	Score	Result	Competition	Ref.
1	5 June 2022	Sinobo Stadium, Prague, Czech Republic	8	Czech Republic	1–1	2–2	2022–23 UEFA Nations League A	
2	17 November 2022	Amman International Stadium, Amman, Jordan	13	Jordan	2–0	3–1	Friendly	
3	23 November 2022	Al Thumama Stadium, Doha, Qatar	14	Costa Rica	5–0	7–0	2022 FIFA World Cup	
4	12 September 2023	Nuevo Los Cármenes, Granada, Spain	23	Cyprus	1–0	6–0	UEFA Euro 2024 qualifying	
5	15 October 2023	Ullevaal Stadion, Oslo, Norway	25	Norway	1–0	1–0	UEFA Euro 2024 qualifying	

== Honours ==
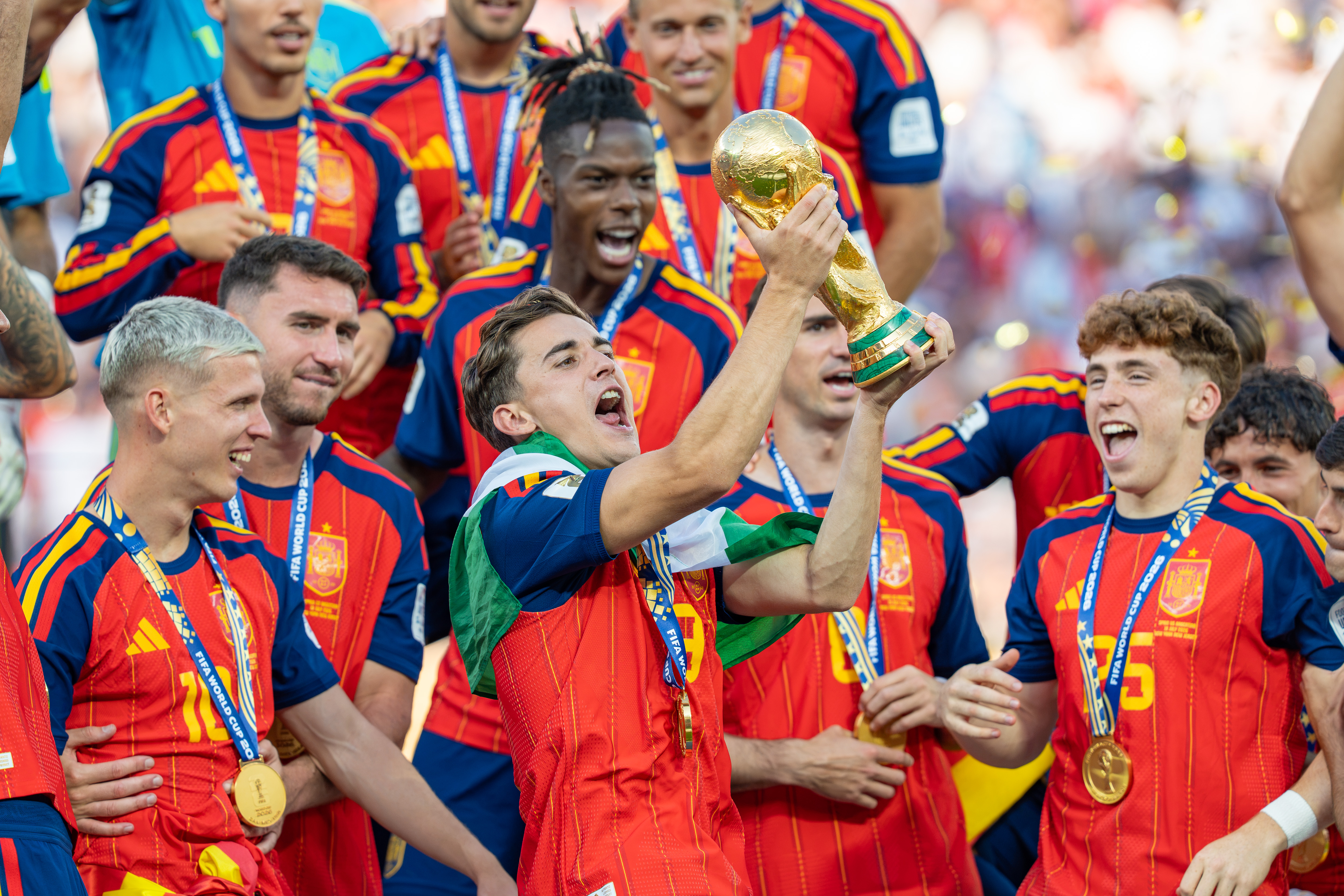
Gavi holding the FIFA World Cup Trophy after Spain won the 2026 final

Barcelona

- La Liga: 2022–23, 2024–25, 2025–26
- Copa del Rey: 2024–25
- Supercopa de España: 2023, 2025

Spain

- FIFA World Cup: 2026
- UEFA Nations League: 2022–23; runner-up: 2024–25

Individual

- Kopa Trophy: 2022
- Golden Boy: 2022
- IFFHS Men's World Youth (U20) Team: 2022, 2023
- IFFHS Men's Youth (U20) UEFA Team: 2022, 2023
- Trofeo Aldo Rovira: 2021–22
