= King Saud University Stadium =

Stadium in Riyadh, Saudi Arabia

Al-Awwal Park
- الأول بارك

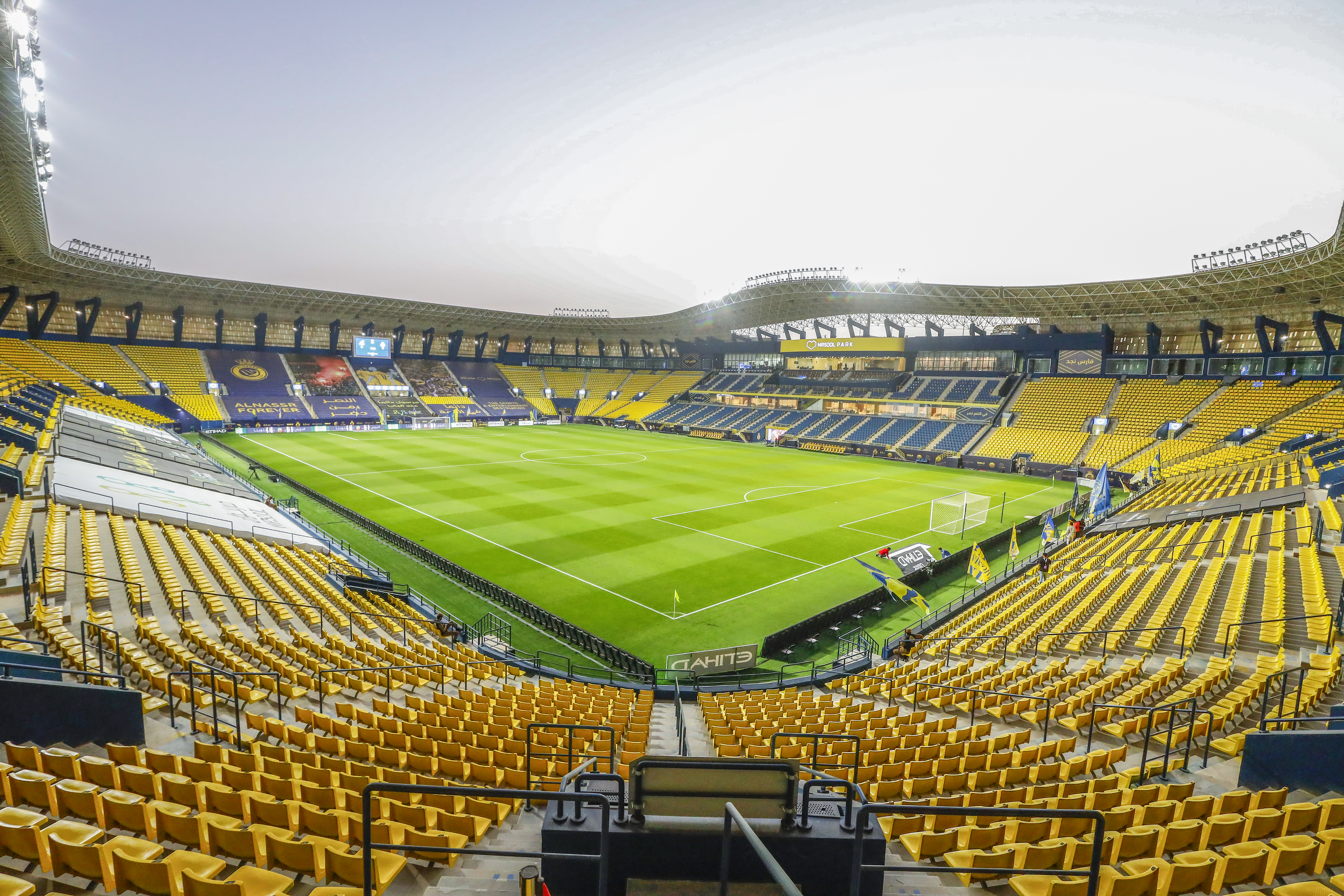
- View from inside Al-Awwal Park
- Interactive map of Al-Awwal Park
- Former names: Mrsool Park (2020–2023)
- Location: Riyadh, Saudi Arabia
- Coordinates: 24°43′45″N 46°37′26″E
- Owner: King Saud University
- Operator: Saudi Media Company (SMC)
- Capacity: 26,004 (46,319 planned for 2034 FIFA World Cup)
- Surface: Hybrid grass
- Scoreboard: Yes
- Field size: Field of play: 105 m × 68 m Pitch area: 125 m × 85 m
- Public transit: 2 King Saud University Station

Construction
- Opened: May 7, 2015; 11 years ago
- Cost: SAR215 million
- Architects: Michael KC Cheah and Steph Cheah
- Builder: Hashem Contracting Company

Tenants
- Al-Nassr (2020–present); Al-Hilal (2018–2020): Major sporting events hosted; 2027 AFC Asian Cup (planned) 2034 FIFA World Cup (planned)

Website
- www.victoryarena.com

King Saud University Stadium (Note: Arabic: ملعب جامعة الملك سعود (romanized: Malʿab Jāmiʿat al-Malik Saʿūd)) is a multi-purpose stadium located in Riyadh, Saudi Arabia. It is known as Al-Awwal Park due to sponsorship reasons and serves as the home stadium of Al-Nassr FC.

== Description ==
=== Refurbishments ===
The stadium began construction in 2011 and was opened in May 2015. Refurbishments will take place from 2030 to 2032, in preparations for the 2034 World Cup.

The renovated stadium will feature an elliptical lightweight spoke-wheel roof and strategically placed amenities designed to ensure accessibility and compliance with FIFA standards. Located on the King Saud University campus in western Riyadh, the stadium offers convenient access from the city center. Surrounding the stadium are additional sports facilities, such as an arena, swimming pool, and tennis courts. Adjacent to the venue is the bustling U Walk, a mixed-use King Saud University development that includes commercial and retail spaces.

=== Post-2034 ===
Following the World Cup, the stadium will serve as the home for King Saud University teams, supporting university sports, community activities, and women’s football. At this stage, part of the upper tier will be removed, reducing the stadium’s capacity to 33,000.

== History ==
The construction work on the campus of King Saud University in Western Riyadh started in Spring 2011 and the opening took place in May 2015. The construction work was commissioned to Hashem Contracting Company, based on designs by Michael KC Cheah and his wife Steph, expanding their architectural portfolio of Saudi-based football stadia.

Hashem Contracting Company delivered the stadium following specifications (and FIFA rules for international games) within the budget of 215 million riyals ($57m). The stadium may seem soil-brown or gold depending on the sunlight due to its perforated and metallic outer skin. Mrsool Park went through a renovation at the end of 2020 and this will continue going forward to transform it into a young and family-friendly destination with fan zones and entertainment areas for everyone to enjoy.

In 2020, the stadium went through a re-branding operation becoming Mrsool Park in November 2020, following the signing with the delivery company Mrsool.

In 2021, the stadium hosted the Maradona Cup between Boca Juniors and FC Barcelona to honor Diego Maradona, who died the previous year.

In April 2023, the stadium was renamed Al-Awwal Park after Saudi Awwal Bank signed a $15 million sponsorship deal for the next three years.

== Events ==
=== Association football ===
- Supercoppa Italiana – 2019, 2023, 2024–25, 2025–26
- Supercopa de España – 2024
- Maradona Cup – 2021

=== Professional wrestling ===
- WWE Crown Jewel 2018
- WWE Crown Jewel 2022

=== Mixed martial arts ===
- PFL 10 (2024)

== Gallery ==
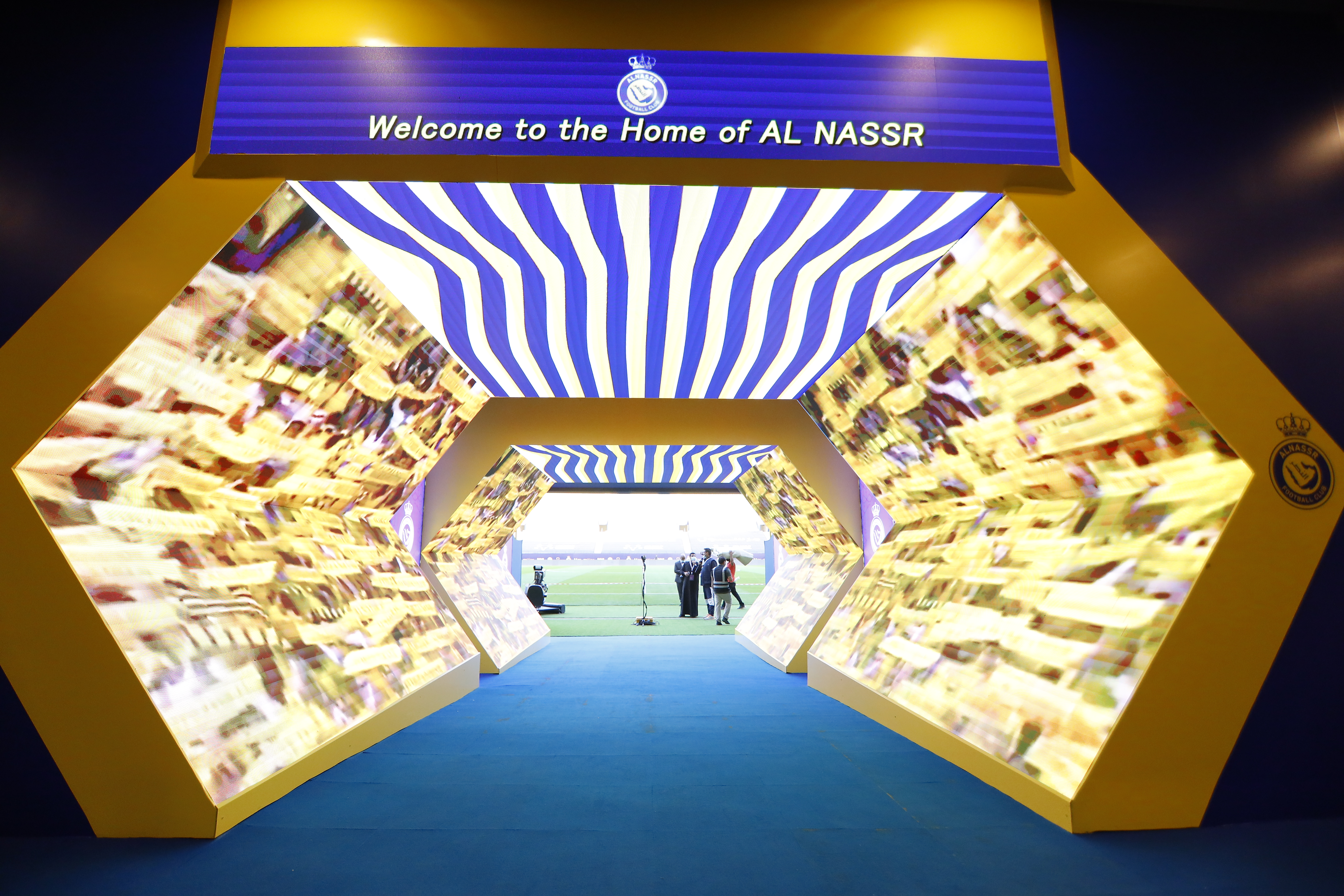
Al-Awwal Park players tunnel

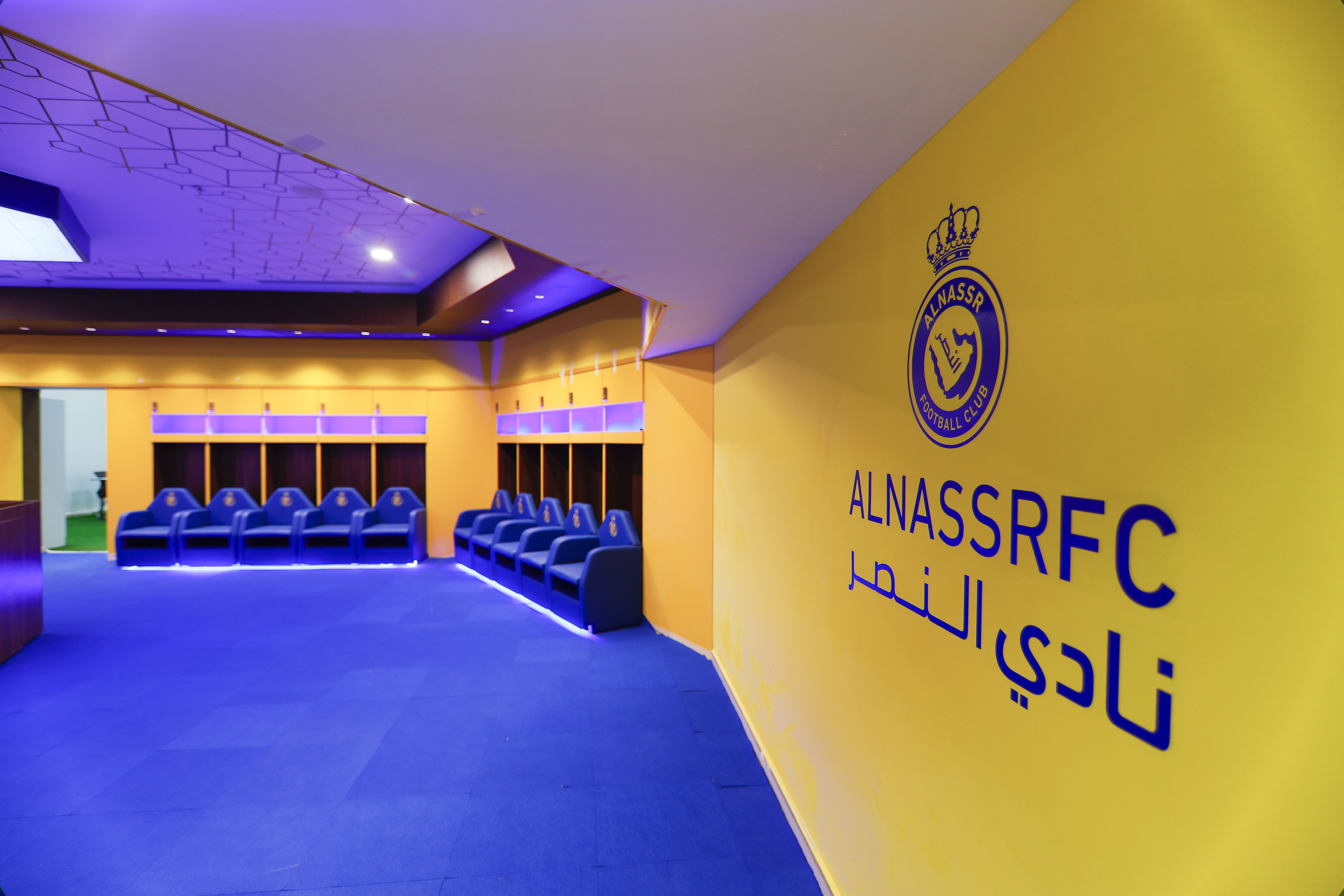
Al-Awwal Park locker room

== See also ==
- List of football stadiums in Saudi Arabia
