= Mrsool =

Saudi on-demand delivery platform

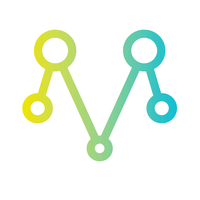
- Native name: مرسول
- Founded: 2015; 11 years ago
- Founder: Ayman Al-Sand, Naif Al-Samri
- Headquarters: Riyadh, Saudi Arabia
- Website: mrsool.co

Mrsool is a Saudi on-demand delivery platform operating in Saudi Arabia, Egypt, and Bahrain. The platform connects customers with independent couriers through a mobile app, allowing users to type out their orders, negotiate delivery prices for goods and products, and enable couriers to accept and complete the deliveries.

== History ==
Mrsool was founded in 2015 by Ayman Al-Sand and Naif Al-Samri. By 2018, the platform had reached 4 million registered users and 150,000 delivery agents, with the platform's total transaction value reaching $270. In June 2019, Mrsool was launched in Egypt, and by the end of the year, the number of requests on the app had reached 10 million. In the same year, Apple's App Store ranked Mrsool among Saudi Arabia's 30 most popular downloads, ranked above Facebook and Uber.

In March 2021, Mrsool was recognized for its role in supporting social responsibility during the COVID-19 crisis at the BT100 celebration. In April, Mrsool signed an agreement with the Ehsan platform, a national charitable initiative established by royal decree to facilitate the delivery of essential goods to needy families during the holy month of Ramadan.

In 2022, the number of registered users on the platform reached 10 million users and 200,000 couriers.

In February 2023, Mrsool partnered with meem Banking, a digital Shariah-compliant bank provided by Gulf International Bank, to launch co-branded debit and credit cards to provide financial services to Mrsool users in Saudi Arabia. During the same year, Mrsool Egypt received high ratings granted by the international Fairwork Foundation for its digital work environments in Africa.

In March 2024, Mrsool entered into an agreement with BookMe, a Pakistani travel technology platform that specializes in e-ticketing, to digitize travel between Saudi Arabia and Pakistan. In April, Mrsool partnered with Suwani, a company owned by the Public Investment Fund, to list camel milk products on its platform. In May, Mrsool collaborated with the National Housing Company, enabling its logistics providers to leverage the navigation services offered by Baladi Maps.

== Funding ==
In March 2019, Mrsool received a series A funding round led by Raed Ventures and STV, with additional participation from Saudi angel investor Mazen Al-Jubeir.

== Sponsorship ==
In 2019, Mrsool Communications and Information Technology App launched the Najahat Initiative to support and empower Egyptian female entrepreneurs.

In 2020, Mrsool acquired the naming rights to King Saud University Stadium, renaming it Mrsool Park. This sponsorship was the first of its kind in the region. The deal follows a management agreement by Waseel and a contract with Al Nassr FC, making the stadium the club's official home.
