= 2021 Maradona Cup =

- The trophy awarded to the winning team
Barcelona	Boca Juniors
(Spain)	(Argentina)
1	1
- Boca Juniors won 4–2 on penalties
- Date: 14 December 2021
- Venue: Mrsool Park, Riyadh, Saudi Arabia
- Referee: Fahad Al-Mirdasi (Saudi Arabia)

The 2021 Maradona Cup was the friendly club football cup organized to honour the late Argentine footballer Diego Armando Maradona, widely regarded as one of the greatest players in the history of the sport. The match was played at Mrsool Park in Riyadh, capital of Saudi Arabia, on 14 December 2021, and was contested by FC Barcelona from Spain and Boca Juniors from Argentina, two clubs that Maradona played for during his career.

Maradona played for Boca Juniors after being traded from Argentinos Juniors in 1981, winning the 1981 Metropolitano championship and leaving the next season to then return in 1995 until his official retirement in 1997. On the other hand, Barcelona were the first European club Maradona played for after his first period at Boca Juniors. During his two seasons with Barcelona, Maradona won the Copa del Rey, the Supercopa de España and the Copa de la Liga.

== Venue ==
Location of the host city of the 2021 Maradona Cup.	Riyadh
Location of the host city of the 2021 Maradona Cup.	Mrsool Park
Location of the host city of the 2021 Maradona Cup.	Capacity: 25,000

== Match ==
=== Summary ===
After the match ended in a 1–1 draw with goals from Ferran Jutglà and Exequiel Zeballos, Boca Juniors defeated Barcelona 4–2 on penalties to win the cup.

=== Details ===
14 December 2021
20:00 UTC+3

Barcelona (Spain)	1–1	(Argentina) Boca Juniors
Jutglà 50'	Report	Zeballos 77'
Penalties
Dani Alves (penalty scored); Jutglà (penalty scored); Matheus (penalty missed); Jaime (penalty missed)	2–4	(penalty scored) Rojo; (penalty scored) Izquierdoz; (penalty scored) Pavón; (penalty scored) Molinas

Mrsool Park, Riyadh
Referee: Fahad Al-Mirdasi (Saudi Arabia)

Barcelona	Boca Juniors

GK	13	(Brazil) Neto
RB	8	(Brazil) Dani Alves
CB	24	(Spain) Eric García	(substituted off) 60' (2)
CB	15	(France) Clément Lenglet (c)	(substituted off) 46' (2)
LB	2	(United States) Sergiño Dest	(substituted off) 64'
CM	27	(Spain) Álvaro Sanz	(substituted off) 60' (1)
CM	6	(Spain) Riqui Puig
RW	11	(Austria) Yusuf Demir	(substituted off) 46' (1)
AM	14	(Brazil) Philippe Coutinho	(substituted off) 68'
LW	18	(Spain) Alejandro Balde
CF	23	(Spain) Ferran Jutglà
Substitutes:
FW	37	(Spain) Ilias Akhomach	(substituted on) 46' (1)
DF	22	(Spain) Óscar Mingueza	(substituted on) 46' (2)
MF	20	(Brazil) Matheus Pereira	(substituted on) 60' (1)
DF	5	(Spain) Mika Màrmol	(substituted on) 60' (2)
DF	35	(Spain) Arnau Comas	(substituted on) 64'
DF	16	(Spain) Guillem Jaime	(substituted on) 68'
Manager:
(Spain) Xavi

GK	1	(Argentina) Agustín Rossi
RB	17	(Peru) Luis Advíncula	(substituted off) 68' (3)
CB	24	(Argentina) Carlos Izquierdoz (c)
CB	6	(Argentina) Marcos Rojo
LB	18	(Colombia) Frank Fabra
DM	21	(Colombia) Jorman Campuzano	(substituted off) 61' (2)
CM	32	(Argentina) Agustín Almendra	(substituted off) 61' (1)
CM	20	(Argentina) Juan Ramírez	(substituted off) 46' (2)
RF	8	(Colombia) Edwin Cardona	(substituted off) 46' (1)
CF	38	(Argentina) Luis Vázquez	(substituted off) 68' (1)
LF	22	(Colombia) Sebastián Villa	(substituted off) 68' (2)
Substitutes:
FW	30	(Argentina) Exequiel Zeballos	(substituted on) 46' (1)
MF	16	(Argentina) Aaron Molinas	(substituted on) 46' (2)
MF	23	(Argentina) Diego González	(substituted on) 61' (1)
MF	33	(Argentina) Alan Varela	(substituted on) 61' (2)
FW	11	(Argentina) Eduardo Salvio	(substituted on) 68' (1)
FW	31	(Argentina) Cristian Pavón	(substituted on) 68' (2)
DF	5	(Peru) Carlos Zambrano	(substituted on) 68' (3)
Manager:
(Argentina) Sebastián Battaglia

Match rules

- 90 minutes.
- Penalty shoot-out if scores still level.
- Unlimited substitutions allowed.

=== Statistics ===
Overall
	Barcelona	Boca Juniors
Goals scored	1	1
Total shots	14	13
Shots on target	3	4
Ball possession	65%	35%
Passing accuracy	89%	77%
Corner kicks	2	2
Fouls committed	12	9
Offsides	3	1
Yellow cards	1	1
Red cards	0	0

2021 Maradona Cup winners
Boca Juniors
1st title
