= U Walk =

- يو ووك
- U Walk, 2024
- Location: King Saud University district, Riyadh, Saudi Arabia
- Coordinates: 24.73908°N 46.62882°E
- Opened: September 2019
- Previous names: University Avenue
- Owner: Cenomi Centers

U Walk (short for University Walk; Arabic: يو ووك), formerly University Avenue (Arabic: جادة الجامعة), is a lifestyle center at the Prince Turki al-Awwal Road in the King Saud University district of Riyadh, Saudi Arabia, owned by Cenomi Centers. Opened in 2019, it covers an area of almost 30 acres and assumed its current name for its flagship feature, a 900-metre long walkway.

== Overview ==
The project was launched by Arabian Centres Company in 2016 and was expected to be completed by 2018. U Walk was officially inaugurated in September 2019. It contains several high-end retail outlets. The complex hosted the promotional events for Diriyah ePrix in January 2022. In March 2022, the Ministry of Defense held one of the 8 exhibitions within the complex.
