= Riqui Puig =

Spanish footballer (born 1999)

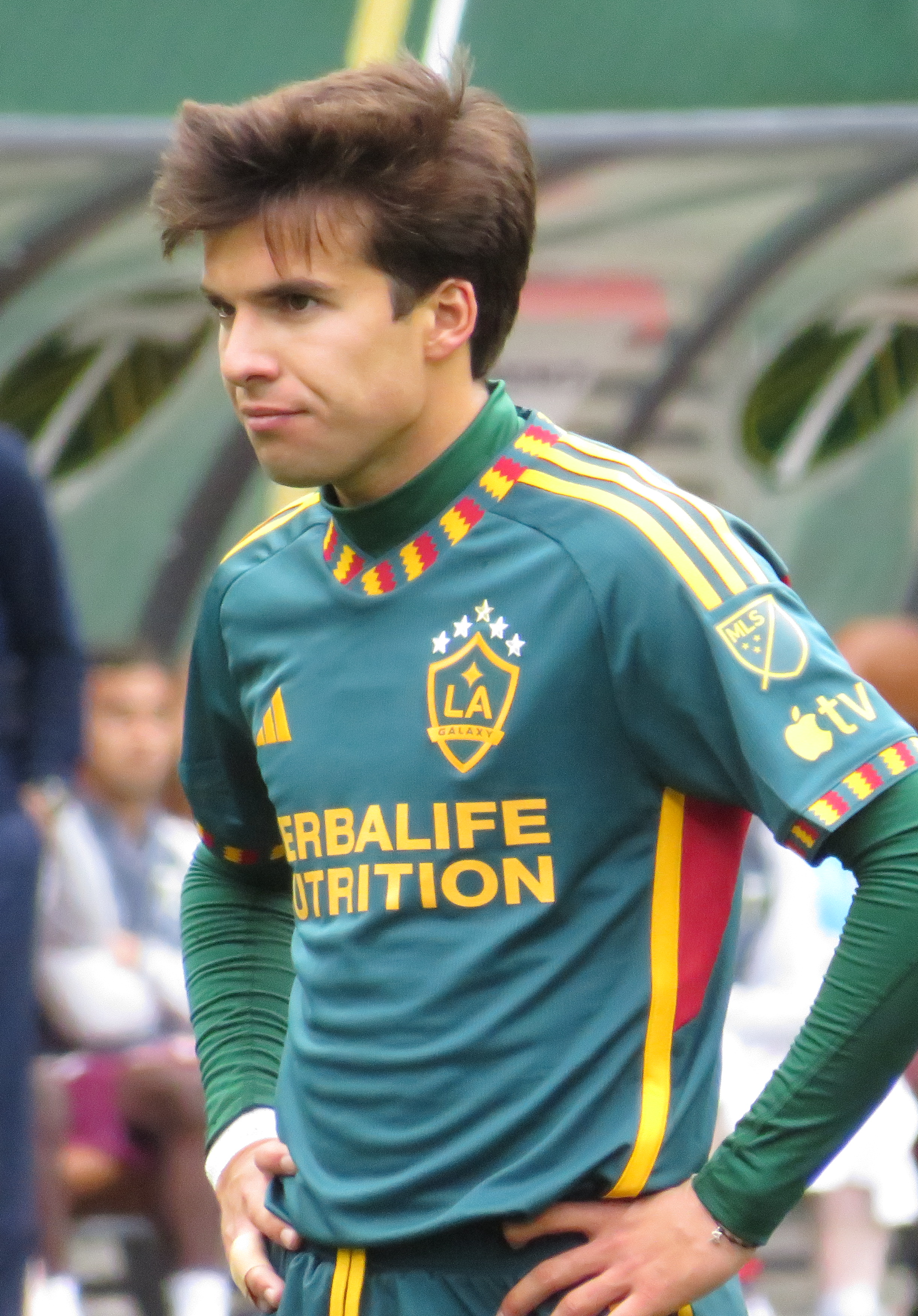
- Puig with LA Galaxy in 2023

Personal information
- Full name: Ricard Puig Martí
- Date of birth: 13 August 1999 (age 27)
- Place of birth: Matadepera, Spain
- Height: 1.69 m (5 ft 7 in)
- Position: Midfielder

Team information
- Current team: LA Galaxy
- Number: 10

Youth career
- 2008–2013: Jàbac Terrassa
- 2013–2018: Barcelona

Senior career*
Years	Team	Apps	(Gls)
2018–2020	Barcelona B	56	(2)
2018–2022	Barcelona	42	(2)
2022–	LA Galaxy	68	(23)

International career^{‡}
2020–2021	Spain U21	4	(0)
2019–	Catalonia	2	(0)
- * Club domestic league appearances and goals as of 19 October 2024 ‡ National team caps and goals as of 30 March 2021

Ricard "Riqui" Puig Martí (Catalan pronunciation: [riˈkaɾt ˈriki ˈputʃ]; born 13 August 1999) is a Spanish professional footballer who plays as a midfielder for Major League Soccer club LA Galaxy.

== Club career ==
=== Barcelona ===
Born in Matadepera, Barcelona, Catalonia, Puig joined Barcelona's La Masia in 2013, from UFB Jàbac Terrassa. After progressing through the youth setup, he made his senior debut with the reserves on 24 February 2018, coming on as a second-half substitute for Marcus McGuane in a 1–1 home draw against Gimnàstic Tarragona in the Segunda División championship.

On 11 June 2018, Puig renewed his contract with Barça until 2021, and was promoted to the B-team in the Segunda División B. He made his first team debut on 5 December, replacing fellow youth graduate Oriol Busquets in the 55th minute of a 4–1 home routing of Cultural Leonesa, in the season's Copa del Rey; he also assisted Denis Suárez, who scored Barcelona's fourth goal.

Puig made his La Liga debut on 13 April 2019, starting and playing 67 minutes in a 0–0 draw against Huesca. He scored his first goal for Barça B on 14 September, the second in a 2–2 home draw against AE Prat.

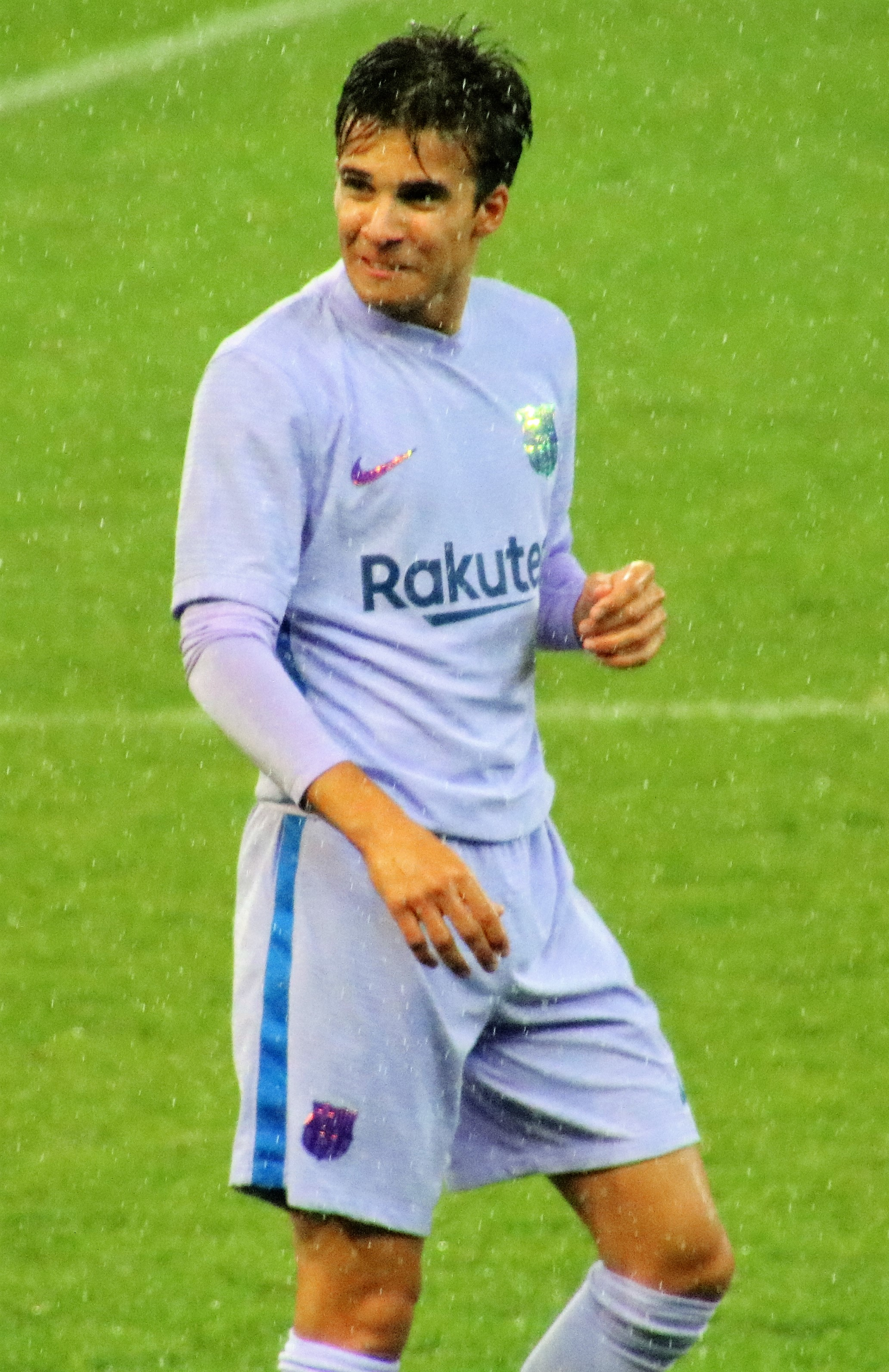
Puig in 2021

On 6 October 2020, Puig was promoted to the first team, being handed the number 12 jersey which was previously worn by Rafinha.

On 13 January 2021, Puig scored the winning penalty in the penalty shootout (Barcelona won 3–2) after being held at 1–1 at the end of extra time by Real Sociedad in the Supercopa de España semi-final. On 24 January 2021, Puig scored his first goal for the first team in a 2–0 away win in La Liga against Elche, when he headed in Barcelona's second goal from a Frenkie de Jong assist.

=== LA Galaxy ===
On 4 August 2022, Puig joined Major League Soccer club LA Galaxy on a free transfer and signed a 3.5-year contract with Targeted Allocation Money. He made his debut on 19 August as a substitute against Seattle Sounders FC, contributing to a 3–3 draw. Puig scored his first MLS goal—a strike from outside the box in the 89th minute—in a 2–2 draw with Toronto FC on 31 August. He was positioned as a playmaker and averaged more than 75 passes per 90 minutes with a high rate of completion as the Galaxy lost only once in their final ten regular season matches. The team qualified for the 2022 MLS Cup Playoffs, where they were eliminated in the Western Conference Semifinals.

On 31 May 2024, Puig signed a new contract with the Galaxy, keeping him at the club until 2027. Later that year, on 30 November, he suffered an ACL rupture during the Western Conference final against Seattle Sounders, yet he provided an assist which led to a 1–0 victory, qualifying his club to the MLS Cup final. The Galaxy went on to win MLS Cup, beating the New York Red Bulls 2–1. Puig did not play for the entire 2025 season, which saw the LA Galaxy miss the playoffs, and underwent a second knee surgery in Barcelona in January 2026. He is scheduled to miss the 2026 season during recovery and rehabilitation.

== Style of play ==
His style of play is characterized by his abilities of directing the motion of the game through his great attacking prowess. A product of La Masia, he has drawn comparisons to Andrés Iniesta in the past.

== Personal life ==
Riqui Puig's father, Carlos, was also a footballer. A left-back, he spent his entire career representing Terrassa. In April 2023, Puig participated in a $20 million investment fund for the upcoming free-to-play football video game Goals.

== Career statistics ==
As of match played 30 November 2024

Appearances and goals by club, season and competition
Club	Season	League			National cup (Note: Includes Copa del Rey, U.S. Open Cup)		Continental		Other		Total	
Club	Season	Division	Apps	Goals	Apps	Goals	Apps	Goals	Apps	Goals	Apps	Goals
Barcelona B	2017–18	Segunda División	3	0	—		—		—		3	0
Barcelona B	2018–19	Segunda División B	32	0	—		—		—		32	0
Barcelona B	2019–20	Segunda División B	21	2	—		—		—		21	2
Barcelona B	Total		56	2	—		—		—		56	2
Barcelona	2018–19	La Liga	2	0	1	0	0	0	0	0	3	0
Barcelona	2019–20	La Liga	11	0	4	0	0	0	0	0	15	0
Barcelona	2020–21	La Liga	14	1	4	0	4 (Note: Appearances in UEFA Champions League)	0	2 (Note: Appearances in Supercopa de España)	0	24	1
Barcelona	2021–22	La Liga	15	1	1	0	2 (Note: One appearance in UEFA Champions League, one appearance in UEFA Europa League)	0	0	0	18	1
Barcelona	Total		42	2	10	0	6	0	2	0	60	2
LA Galaxy	2022	Major League Soccer	10	3	0	0	—		2 (Note: Appearances in MLS Cup playoffs)	0	12	3
LA Galaxy	2023	Major League Soccer	29	7	3	1	—		2 (Note: Appearances in Leagues Cup)	1	34	9
LA Galaxy	2024	Major League Soccer	29	13	—		—		7 (Note: Three appearances in Leagues Cup, four appearances and four goals in MLS Cup playoffs)	4	36	17
LA Galaxy	2025	Major League Soccer	0	0	—		0	0	0	0	0	0
LA Galaxy	2026	Major League Soccer	0	0	—		0	0	—		0	0
LA Galaxy	Total		68	23	3	1	0	0	11	5	115	46
Career total			166	27	13	1	6	0	13	5	231	50

== Honours ==
Barcelona Youth

- UEFA Youth League: 2017–18

Barcelona

- La Liga: 2018–19
- Copa del Rey: 2020–21

LA Galaxy

- MLS Cup: 2024
- Western Conference (MLS): 2024

Individual

- MLS Best XI: 2024
- MLS All-Star: 2023, 2024
