= Dest =

Dest or DEST may refer to:

- DEST, Deutsche Erd- und Steinwerke GmbH or "German Earth & Stone Works Company" Inc, an SS owned company
- Domestic Emergency Support Team, a rapidly deployable, interagency team of experts within the United States government
- Higher Diploma of Technical Studies (France), a former Master's Degree school diploma issued by the French higher education establishment
- NASDAQ symbol for Destination Maternity, a designer and retailer of maternity apparel

== People with the surname Dest ==
- Sergiño Dest (born 2000), American soccer player
