= Toybank =

Indian children's advocacy organization

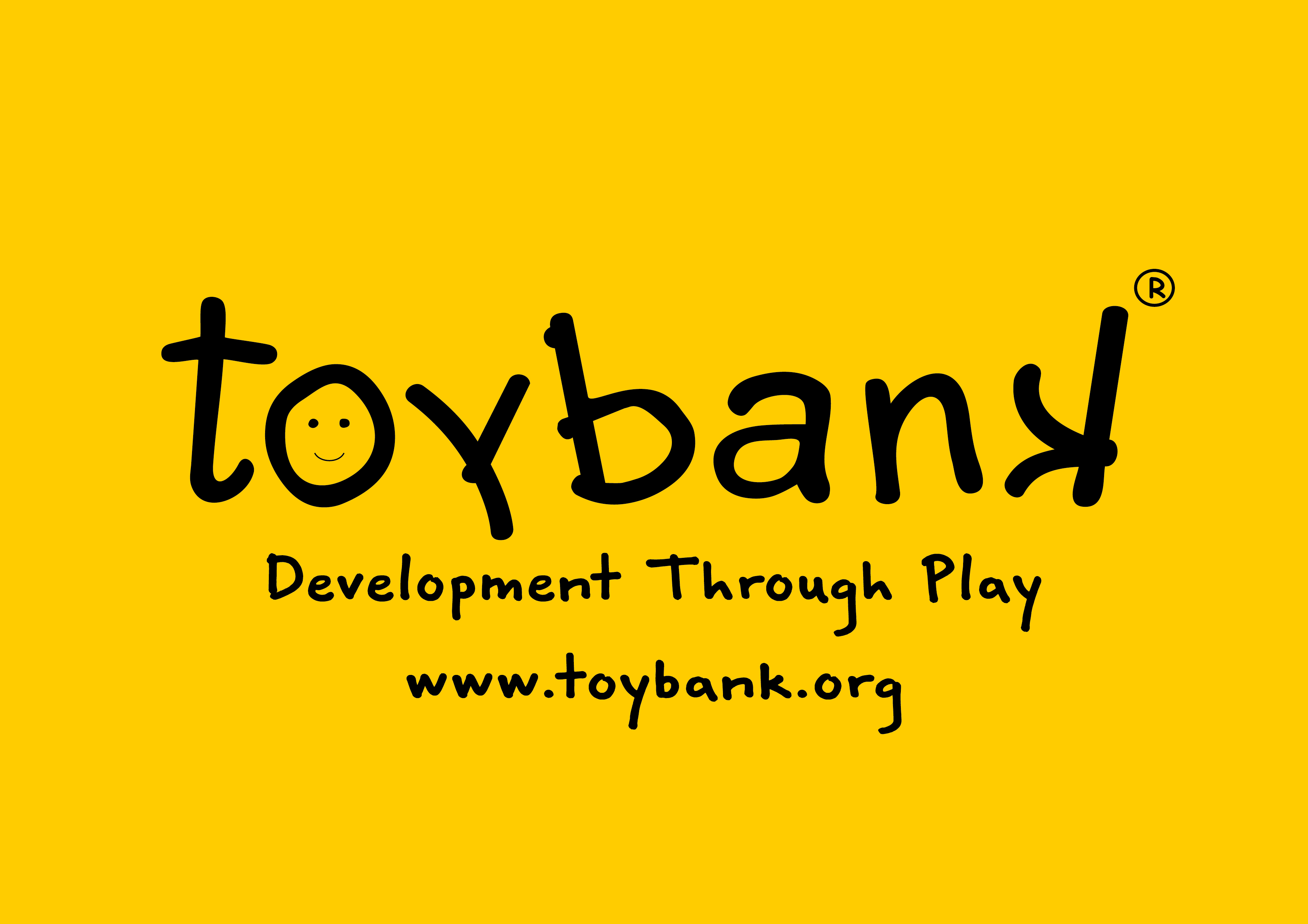
- Formation: August 2004
- Founder: Shweta Chari and Vikram Nerurkar
- Type: Non-governmental organisation
- Headquarters: Mumbai, India
- Website: www.toybank.org

Toybank, an initiative under The Opentree Foundation is an organization in India that promotes 'Development Through Play' for all children. It was founded in August 2004 by Shweta Chari. It has its headquarters in Mumbai with a presence in Pune, Bangalore, Hyderabad, Delhi, Goa and Bhutan.

Play can have a great impact on a child's life as it holds the power to change the minds of young children. Toybank provides physical, mental and behavioral development in children through play and by providing safe spaces to them. Engaging with at-risk children and educating them through plays is the motive behind the organisation. This helps them to make better choices and can provide the happy childhood that a child deserves. Toybank conducts the distribution of toys and board games to at-risk children by curating Play2Learn Centres. The organization has set up 400+ active Play2Learn centers for this cause across 12 districts in Maharashtra, 4 states and 1 union territory around the country.

== History ==
Toybank was initiated in 2004 by Shweta Chari. Her initial efforts to garner donations received a favorable response with a donation of over a thousand toys within a month. Chari took up a job in 2005 to fund her organization's activities but quit in 2009 to completely focus her attention on Toybank.

Toybank's first major project was a toy distribution event for underprivileged children in 3 locations around Mumbai. From the year 2006, Toy collection drives begin with the help of corporate, schools and housing societies. In the following year, Toybank expands its activities outside the state of Maharashtra like Bangalore and Bhutan. It got first featured in the program 'Young Turks' on CNBC.

Toybank sets up its first play center in the year 2010. By 2015, Toybank had established its presence in the form of 154 play centers in Mumbai, and volunteers from other cities including Delhi, Pune, Bnagalore helped the organization by conducting collections and distribution of toys. Toybank was also involved in setting up 22 Play2Learn centers in the drought-hit district of Beed, Maharashtra affecting over 3100 children in 2016. Now more than 15 years in the working, Toybank has affected more than 1,00,000 children across Maharashtra.

== Areas of work ==
Toybank initially started with the objective of providing toys to children from weak socioeconomic backgrounds and this has been their primary area of work since its inception. Toybank regularly organizes collection drives in schools, corporate houses etc. through its volunteer network. These toys are then dispatched to its play centers or wrapped and set aside for distribution.

Toybank has a network of total 411 Play2Learn centres in 12 districts in Maharashtra. A library of toys is maintained at each one of these play centers visited by children from poor backgrounds. The toys at the libraries may either be newly bought or collected through the toy collection drives. These centers are the places where Play2Learn sessions are held twice a month which involve children from these schools along with teachers and conduct games and interactive sessions. Over the years, Toybank has assured the confidence of these children and also teachers and parents. As of 2020, Toybank is affiliated with 72 partners around the country.

Toybank has also been involved in sensitizing society about the importance of play in a child's development through its "Power of Play" workshops. These workshops are held in schools and co-operatives to spread awareness among students, teachers and individuals in society through speeches and presentations. Other works include fundraising and participating in events like marathons by members and volunteers to help spread awareness about the same.

In March 2020, WHO declared a global state of a pandemic due to the wide outbreak COVID-19, and a state of lockdown was declared. These sudden restrictions made an impact on the mental and social health of people of all ages, especially children. Underserved children were the most affected who were forced to migrate due to the loss of jobs of their parents or guardians. This resulted in the loss of contacts with thousands of children. Not only children were having difficulty with the online mode of education, but they were also forgetting what they learned in the previous years. As the result, it endangered academic and developmental advancement which is needed for a positive future.

Toybank, keeping in mind the UNICEF's definition of well-being, followed the 3R way (Relief- Response- Rebuild) to keep children mentally engaged at home and focused on preparing the children for the new normal. Using Digital technologies, Digital Play2Learn Programs were conducted. For this, WhatsApp was chosen as a medium to interact with children by connecting with teachers, primary caregivers, and Toybank program officers. In this way, Digital Play2Learn Kits also known as PlayAtHome kits were developed that contained activities and puzzles for children to solve. Play2Learn sheets were distributed in these support groups that would engage the children to play for up to five hours that boosted their morality. A total of 433 support groups and 742 Play2Learn sheets were curated. These sheets were also translated into 5 languages and were made available to different places around the country. Along with this, Teacher Training Workshops and Buddy programs were held via online meeting platforms to incorporate Play2Learn Kits into academic lessons and understanding of virtual learning plans. More than 50000 children were benefited with the help of 500+ volunteers, 73 partners and 5 Covid collaborators. Digital Play2Learn program were also adapted to different rural areas in the states of Andhra Pradesh, Tamil Nadu, Madhya Pradesh, Ladakh and Manipur. Toybank also focuses on rebuilding Play2Learn programs when centres and schools reopen to bring children back on track with their academics and development.

== Media ==
- 'How Toybank's learning-through-play is helping at-risk children grow into responsible adults' -15-09-2021
- Online Education Project 2 P Latur- Bali Bhoge - YouTube Handle of Govt covered Toybank-2021
- 'Coverage of our Toy distribution in Matheran' 2021 published by महाराष्ट्र प्रवाह न्युज
- Nexus of Good published two articles in the year 2020 and 2021 titled- 'Making at-risk children Resilient and Life-ready through Play' and 'A time to learn through Play during COVID-19 for Samay'
- . 'Making Play the New Normal!'-2020 and 'A bank full of joy'-2012 articles published by Our Better World
- 'This Mumbai-Based Toy Bank' Propagates Right to Play for All Children'-2020 released by The Wire
- 'This Digital Play Kit Has Everything You Need For A Happier, Healthier Child'-2020, article by LBB
- 'Toybank-Development through Play is enabling disabled kids to discover the power of play'-2019 by Newz Hook
- 'पढाई जितना ही जरूरी है खेलना बच्चों के चेहरे पर मुस्कान लाने के लिए नौकरी छोड़ खोला खिलौना बैंक'- 2018, an article by amarujala
- 'A Bank of Games and Fun' article was published in the year 2009 and 'Donate toys to make playtime accessible for all kids' in the year 2018 published by The Indian Express about Toybank
- 'Kerala flood relief has a made-in Mumbai toy story' published in the year 2018 by The Hindu
- 'Mumbai NGO to supply toys to flood-hit anganwadis in Kerala'-2018 by onmanorama
- 'A toy in the hands of every child' - Toybank was published in 2010, 'TBI Videos: Watch Shweta Chan's Toy Story' -2013 and 'Remember Enjoying Board Games? One NGO Is Helping Underprivileged Kids Play Them Tool'-2017 published by The Better India
- A Strong Corporate Engagement is Crucial Shweta Chart, Toybank 2016, article by CSR Live
- 'Vacation with a cause: Children volunteer for NGOs during summer holidays' 2013, article by DNA
- Toybank founder, Shweta Chari was featured in the show Young Turks that aired on CNBC TV18 in 2006 and on CNN-IBN as a "Young Social Change Maker" in the "India Positive "news feature in 2013 and Diwali Celebration Interview on CNN IBN in 2013
- Toybank was also featured on Times Now in 2012(Amazing Indians-Distributing Smiles)
- Toybank was featured in the UK edition of Secret Millionaire in 2010.

== Awards ==
- Presented to the Consulate of the Singapore Government in 2013 and 2015(collaboration)
- National Innovation Council, 2014(collaboration)
- 9th Spirit of Humanity 2018-Child care Category, 2018 Spirit of Humanity
- Global Good Award 2019- Education category, 2019 Global Good
- IPA Special Award on Right to Play in Time of Crisis, 2020 IPA
- GOLD winners Global Good Awards-COVID Crisis Champions (Small Organisations), 22-09-2021 Global Good Awards
- Runner-up in the 2021 Ethical Angel & CAF Community Investment Award, 22-09-2021 Global Good Awards
- ·Indira International Innovation Star Social Entrepreneur Award 2012-Shweta Chari(won)
