= Navi Radjou =

Indian business theorist (born 1970)

- Born: 14 August 1970 (age 55); Pondicherry, India
- Citizenship: France; United States
- Education: Conservatoire national des arts et métiers (DEST); Ecole Centrale Paris (MS)
- Occupation(s): Author, speaker, strategist
- Website: naviradjou.com

Navi Radjou (born 14 August 1970) is an Indian born scholar and an innovation and leadership advisor based in Silicon Valley. He is a Fellow of Judge Business School at the University of Cambridge and has spoken and written widely on the theme of frugal innovation.

== Career ==
Radjou was born in India with French-American dual citizenship. He earned a diploma in technical studies (DEST) from the National Conservatory of Arts and Crafts (CNAM) in Paris, France and an MS degree in information systems from Ecole Centrale Paris. He started his career with IBM at its Toronto Software Lab and eventually served nearly ten years as Vice President and Principal Analyst at Forrester Research, a US-based technology research and consulting firm. At Forrester, he investigated how globalised innovation – with the rise of India and China as both a source and market for innovations – is driving new market structures and organizational models called "Global Innovation Networks". During his tenure at Forrester, he advised senior executives around the world on technology-enabled best practices to drive collaborative innovation, global supply chain integration, and proactive customer service.

Till 2011, he served as the Executive Director of the Centre for India & Global Business at Judge Business School, University of Cambridge, where Jaideep Prabhu was the director. Radjou is a Fellow at Judge Business School and a World Economic Forum (WEF) faculty member. He is a member of WEF's Global Future Council on Innovation & Entrepreneurship. For several consecutive years, he has served on the international panel of judges for The Economist’s Innovation Awards. Navi also served as a judge for FastCompany's 2017 World Changing Ideas Awards.

== Writing ==
At Forrester, Radjou published more than a hundred reports on business topics related to innovation and emerging markets. Based on his extensive field research in India he published in 2008 a ten-part report series titled "India: The Innovation Giant (Re)Awakens", which explores the innovative business models pioneered by large corporations and grassroots entrepreneurs in India.

Radjou is co-author of Frugal Innovation published worldwide by The Economist in 2015. The book explains the principles, perspectives and techniques behind frugal innovation. He is also co-author of the international best-seller Jugaad Innovation (Jossey-Bass, 2012). described by The Economist as "the most comprehensive book yet to appear on the subject" of frugal innovation. He is co-author of From Smart To Wise, a book on next generation leadership. He is also a regular columnist on Harvard Business Review, Bloomberg Businessweek and The Wall Street Journal, and maintains a blog on HarvardBusinessReview.org.

Navi's next book, Conscious Society: Reinventing How We Consume, Work, and Live (due in 2018), shows how we can all expand our awareness and tap into our abundant inner-resources—love, ingenuity, wisdom—to co-create inclusive and sustainable communities. In doing so, we can consciously steer human evolution to a better future.

== Speaking ==
Radjou frequently acts as a keynote speaker and is widely quoted in international media. In 2014, Navi delivered a talk at TED Global on frugal innovation, which has received over 1,5 million video views.

He is a frequent speaker to senior executive groups and has spoken on the topics of innovation and globalisation at leading conferences organised by the World Economic Forum, Council on Foreign Relations, The Conference Board, TiE (Indus Entrepreneurs), Milken Institute, Asia Society, Harvard University, and MIT.

== Awards and recognition ==
Radjou has had wide exposure in national and international media, including The Wall Street Journal, The Economist, Bloomberg Businessweek, Financial Times, Le Monde, and Nikkei Shimbun. He is ranked as one of the 50 most influential persons shaping innovation in France.

In 2013, he received the Thinkers50 Innovation Award — given to a management thinker who is re-shaping the way we think about and practice innovation. In addition, his book Jugaad Innovation was shortlisted for the 2013 Thinkers50 CK Prahalad Breakthrough Idea Award.

Named by BusinessWeek as an "expert in corporate innovation," he was also honoured by the Financial Times, which called his co-authored work on National Innovation Networks – the first-ever ranking of countries by their collaborative aptitude to integrate innovation capabilities across multiple regions – as "ambitious" and "sophisticated". His latest research on "polycentric innovation" – a new approach that multinationals can use to integrate globally distributed R&D and innovation capabilities – has been featured in The Economist, The Wall Street Journal, Global Intelligence for the CIO, and Le Monde. Similarly, his concept of "indovation" — the unique process by which innovations are developed in India to serve a large number of people sustainably — has been featured in The Financial Times and in several conferences organised by Asia Society.

== Criticism ==
Radjou and his co-authors’ work on jugaad (innovation) has been criticized by Indian academics and scientists such as Rishikesha Krishnan, Vijay Govindarajan, Anil Gupta, and RA Mashelkar who believe the practice of jugaad can lead only to makeshift solutions that are unsafe, unscalable, and unsustainable.

Radjou addressed this criticism in an article in Thinkers magazine arguing that jugaad isn’t intrinsically good or bad. Jugaad is a creative mindset: it is the intention (good or bad) of the person using this ingenious mindset that determines the quality of the outcome (positive or negative).

== Notes ==
- Made in India for the 21st Century, Navi Radjou, 28 January 2010, Asia Society New York
- Transforming R & D To Win in Global Innovation Networks, Navi Radjou, 1 March 2007, PARC Forum,
- Turbocharging the Franco-Indian Partnership, Navi Radjou, 15 July 2009, Bloomberg Businessweek,
- Polycentric Innovation: A New mandate for Multinationas, Navi Radjou, 2 November 2009, The Wall Street Journal,
- INDOvations, moderated by Navi Radjou, 28 January 2010, Asia Society, New York,
- Managing the New Trajectory of Global Innovation, Navi Radjou, 14 October 2009, Council on Foreign Relations.
- India's Decade of Innovation, Navi Radjou, 16 February 2010, Cambridge Judge Business School.
- Polycentric Innovation Video Interview, IBM, 27 May 2010, Cambridge Judge Business School,
- Creating the Next "Indovations", Navi Radjou, 27 November 2009, India Economic Summit 2009, World Economic Forum,Panel on YouTube
- Made in India, for the world, N Madhavan,12 May 2010, Business Today.
- Do Multinationals Really Understand Globalization?, Navi Radjou, Prasad kaipa, 6 August 2010, Bloomberg Businessweek.
- Talking about Indovations, Nisha Kumar, Kulkarni, 2.12.10, Beyond Profit.
