= Vadodara Innovation Council =

Indian think tank and government agency

- Founded: May 2011
- Location: Vadodara, Gujarat, India
- Website: www.vicindia.org

Vadodara Innovation Council (VIC) is the first city-based Innovation Council in India, associated with the National Innovation Council. Vadodara Innovation Council started functioning in May-2011 under the leadership of technocrat Dr. Madhu Mehta. VIC, a non-profit company, has the stated goal "To build Innovative, Curious and Questioning Society in Vadodara region".

== Vadodara as an Innovative city ==
On 16 June 2013, Sam Pitroda has launched an initiative to make 'Vadodara as an Innovative city'.

== Tod Fod Jod Centre ==
It has started 'Tod Fod Jod Centre' (TFJC) for school students, being the second such initiative in India after Delhi. IT is a unique initiative, where students open the device, understand the different parts, its working principles, scientific & engineering concepts behind it and then assemble it. In its first phase, the students experimented with a ceiling fan, computer, clock, bicycle and telephone.

== Innovation partner to VCCI Expo 2014 ==
Vadodara Chamber of Commerce Industry (VCCI) has partnered with VIC for VCCI Expo 2014 (27 November 2014 – 1 December 2014), where 56 participants showcased their innovation or prototypes.

== Recognitions ==
The model is to be replicated in 1,000 cities of India. In its first phase 31 schools including 11 municipal (government) schools were covered.

== See also ==
- National Innovation Council
