= Sergiño Dest =

Professional soccer player (born 2000)

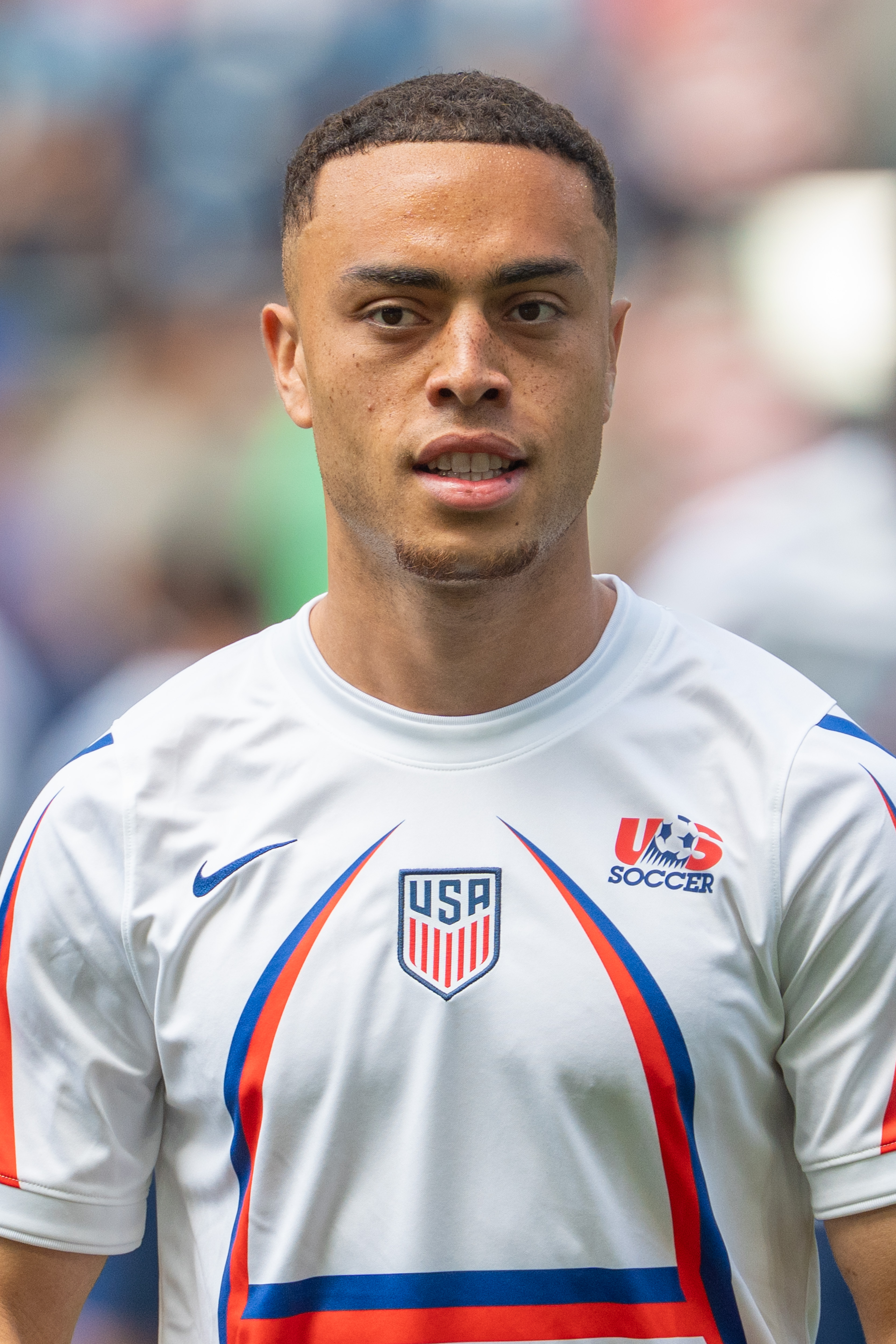
- Dest with the United States in 2026

Personal information
- Full name: Sergiño Gianni Dest
- Date of birth: November 3, 2000 (age 26)
- Place of birth: Almere, Netherlands
- Height: 5 ft 7 in (1.71 m)
- Position: Full-back

Team information
- Current team: PSV
- Number: 8

Youth career
- 2009–2012: Almere City
- 2012–2018: Ajax

Senior career*
Years	Team	Apps	(Gls)
2018–2020	Jong Ajax	18	(1)
2019–2020	Ajax	23	(0)
2020–2024	Barcelona	51	(2)
2022–2023	→ AC Milan (loan)	8	(0)
2023–2024	→ PSV (loan)	25	(2)
2024–	PSV	44	(3)

International career^{‡}
2016–2017	United States U17	5	(0)
2018–2019	United States U20	12	(1)
2019–	United States	46	(3)
Medal record
Representing United States
Men's soccer
CONCACAF Nations League
Winner	2021 United States
Winner	2023 United States
Winner	2024 United States
CONCACAF U-20 Championship
Winner	United States 2018	U-20 Team
- * Club domestic league appearances and goals as of October 31, 2026 ‡ National team caps and goals as of October 6, 2026

Sergiño Gianni Dest (/ˈsədʒɪnjoʊ ˈdɛst/; born November 3, 2000) is a professional soccer player who plays as a full-back for Eredivisie club PSV Eindhoven. Born in the Netherlands, he represents the United States national team. He is known for his dribbling, pace, and offensive ability.

Dest began his professional career with Jong Ajax after featuring in the club's youth academy, later debuting with the Ajax senior team in July 2019. He won the Ajax Talent of the Year award in 2020. He transferred to Barcelona in October 2020 for a fee of €21 million, winning the 2020–21 Copa del Rey and was he named to the 2020 IFFHS World Youth (U20) Team. He went on loans to AC Milan in 2022 and PSV Eindhoven in 2023, winning the 2023–24 Eredivisie. He moved permanently to the club in June 2024.

Dest debuted for the United States national team in September 2019 and won the CONCACAF Nations League in 2021, 2023, and 2024. He won the 2019 U.S. Young Soccer Player of the Year award.

== Early life ==
Dest was born in Almere to Surinamese-American father Kenneth Dest and a Dutch mother. Kenneth Dest was born in Suriname and immigrated to the United States with his family when he was young, settling in Brooklyn, and eventually naturalized as a U.S. citizen.

== Club career ==
=== Early career ===
Dest played for the youth academy of Almere City until 2012, when he moved to the Ajax youth academy. Initially a forward, he progressed through the ranks of the club until making the switch to a full-back.

=== Ajax ===
Dest debuted for Jong Ajax on October 15, 2018, in a 2–1 loss against Jong PSV. Dest impressed over the course of the 2018–19 season, making 18 appearances in the Dutch Eerste Divisie and tallying one goal and two assists. He also scored one goal and provided one assist in seven appearances in the prestigious UEFA Youth League.

On July 27, 2019, Dest made his debut for the Ajax first team in an official game when he started the 2019 Johan Cruyff Shield match against rivals PSV Eindhoven. Ajax won the match 2–0 and claimed the trophy. On August 10, 2019, Dest debuted in the Eredivisie, replacing Noussair Mazraoui in the 54th minute of Ajax's 5–0 home win against Emmen. He also appeared as a substitute in qualifying matches for the UEFA Champions League against PAOK and APOEL.

In September, Dest was officially promoted to the Ajax first-team squad. On September 17, 2019, he made his first start in the Champions League against Lille, a match which Ajax won 3–0. Dest finished his first senior season with 35 appearances in which he scored two goals—both in a KNVB Cup fixture against Telstar. For his performances, he won the 2020 Ajax Talent of the Year award and finished 14th in the Golden Boy award voting.

=== Barcelona ===
On October 1, 2020, Dest transferred to Barcelona for an initial €21 million fee plus a further €5 million in variables. He signed a five-year contract with the club with a buyout clause set at €400 million. Dest made his debut for Barcelona on October 4, coming on as a 75th-minute substitute for Jordi Alba in a 1–1 draw against Sevilla. With the appearance, Dest became the first American to appear for Barcelona in La Liga. On October 20, he became the first American to play for Barcelona in a UEFA Champions League match.

Later that month, Dest set another milestone, becoming the first American to play in El Clásico; Barcelona fell in a 1–3 defeat to rivals Real Madrid, but Dest's performance in the match was praised. On November 25, 2020, Dest scored his first goal for Barcelona in a 4–0 away win over Dynamo Kyiv in the Champions League group stage. In doing so, Dest became the first American to score a professional goal for the club. On March 21, 2021, he scored a brace in a 6–1 away win over Real Sociedad.

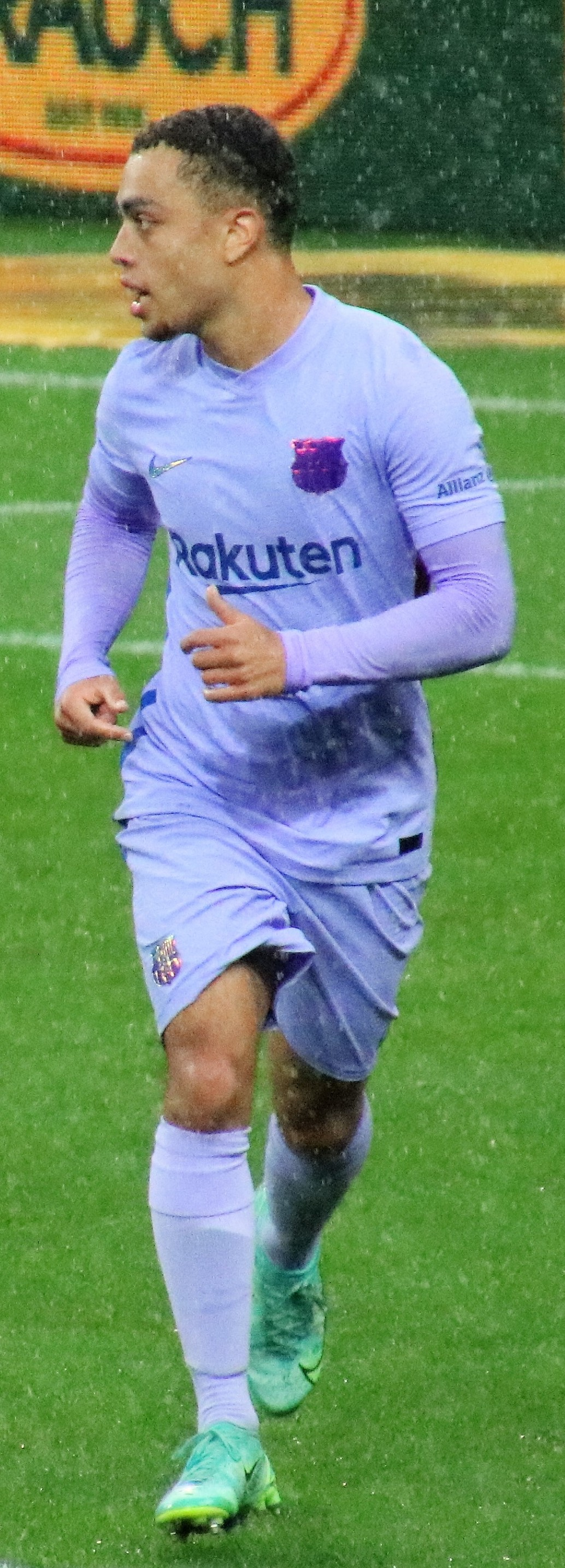
Dest playing for Barcelona in 2021

==== Loan to AC Milan ====
On September 1, 2022, Dest signed for Serie A club AC Milan on a one-year loan with option to buy for €20 million. Dest made his Serie A debut on September 17, in a match against Napoli. He entered the match at halftime, replacing Davide Calabria.

=== PSV ===
On August 21, 2023, Dest joined Eredivisie club PSV on a season-long loan deal. In April 2024, he suffered an ACL injury which prematurely ended his season, though he was integral to the campaign that ended up winning the 2023–24 Eredivisie. In June 2024, he moved permanently to the club on a free transfer.

== International career ==
Dest has dual nationality making him eligible to play for either the United States or the Netherlands and ultimately chose to play for the United States' senior national team. Dest has represented the United States at youth and full international level. He played five games in total for the United States under-17 team, including four appearances at the 2017 FIFA Under-17 World Cup.

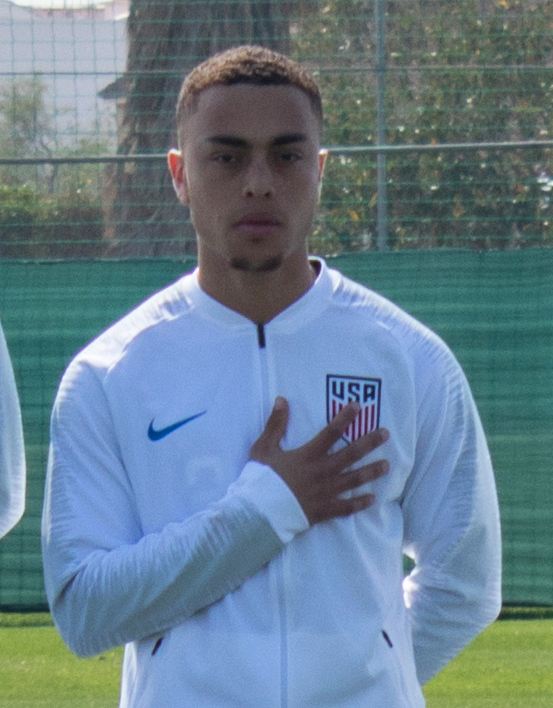
Dest with the United States U20 in 2019.

He represented the United States under-20 team at the 2019 FIFA Under-20 World Cup, where he played four matches. In total, he made 12 appearances and scored one goal for the under-20 team.

Dest made his senior debut for the United States on September 6, 2019, starting and playing 68 minutes in a 3–0 friendly loss against Mexico. Dest chose to commit his international future to the United States at the senior level on October 28, 2019.

He was included in the United States' 26-man roster for the 2022 FIFA World Cup in Qatar. During the tournament, Dest provided the assist for Christian Pulisic's winning goal in a 1–0 victory over Iran, which sent the United States into the round of 16. In the next game against the Netherlands (his birth nation), he was culpable in leaving too much space for Daley Blind to score the second Dutch goal in a 3–1 defeat for the U.S.

At the 2023–24 CONCACAF Nations League on November 20, 2023, against Trinidad and Tobago, Dest was sent off after receiving 2 yellow cards in 20 seconds after controversially arguing with the referee and U.S. teammates. He missed the 2024 Copa América hosted in the United States due to an ACL injury.

On May 26, 2026, Dest was selected in the 26-man squad for the 2026 FIFA World Cup.

== Style of play ==
Dest playing for United States at the 2026 FIFA World Cup

Dest plays as a full-back, performing offensive attacking and defensive roles and maintaining possession. A natural dribbler, he uses his high pace when pushing forward against opponents and defending.

== Career statistics ==
=== Club ===
As of match played October 31, 2026

Appearances and goals by club, season and competition
Club	Season	League			National cup (Note: Includes KNVB Cup, Copa del Rey, Coppa Italia)		Europe		Other		Total	
Club	Season	Division	Apps	Goals	Apps	Goals	Apps	Goals	Apps	Goals	Apps	Goals
Jong Ajax	2018–19	Eerste Divisie	17	1	—		—		—		17	1
Jong Ajax	2019–20	Eerste Divisie	1	0	—		—		—		1	0
Jong Ajax	Total		18	1	—		—		—		18	1
Ajax	2019–20	Eredivisie	20	0	4	2	10 (Note: Eight appearances in UEFA Champions League, two appearances in UEFA Europa League)	0	1 (Note: Appearance in Johan Cruyff Shield)	0	35	2
Ajax	2020–21	Eredivisie	3	0	—		—		—		3	0
Ajax	Total		23	0	4	2	10	0	1	0	38	2
Barcelona	2020–21	La Liga	30	2	3	0	7 (Note: Appearance(s) in UEFA Champions League)	1	1 (Note: Appearance in Supercopa de España)	0	41	3
Barcelona	2021–22	La Liga	21	0	1	0	9 (Note: Four appearances in UEFA Champions League, five appearances in UEFA Europa League)	0	—		31	0
Barcelona	Total		51	2	4	0	16	1	1	0	72	3
AC Milan (loan)	2022–23	Serie A	8	0	1	0	4	0	1 (Note: Appearance in Supercoppa Italiana)	0	14	0
PSV (loan)	2023–24	Eredivisie	25	2	2	0	10	0	—		37	2
PSV	2024–25	Eredivisie	7	0	0	0	0	0	0	0	7	0
PSV	2025–26	Eredivisie	27	1	4	0	6	0	1	1	38	2
PSV	2026–27	Eredivisie	10	2	0	0	3	1	0	0	13	3
PSV	Total		44	3	4	0	9	1	1	1	58	5
Career total			169	8	15	2	49	2	4	1	236	13

=== International ===
As of match played October 6, 2026

Appearances and goals by national team and year
National team	Year	Apps	Goals
United States	2019	3	0
United States	2020	2	0
United States	2021	10	2
United States	2022	8	0
United States	2023	9	0
United States	2024	1	0
United States	2025	4	0
United States	2026	9	1
Total		46	3

Scores and results list United States' goal tally first, score column indicates score after each Dest goal.

List of international goals scored by Sergiño Dest
No.	Date	Venue	Cap	Opponent	Score	Result	Competition
1	March 25, 2021	Stadion Wiener Neustadt, Wiener Neustadt, Austria	6	Jamaica	1–0	4–1	Friendly
2	October 13, 2021	Lower.com Field, Columbus, United States	15	Costa Rica	1–1	2–1	2022 FIFA World Cup qualification
3	May 31, 2026	Bank of America Stadium, Charlotte, United States	38	Senegal	1–0	3–2	Friendly

== Honors ==
Ajax

- Johan Cruyff Shield: 2019

Barcelona

- Copa del Rey: 2020–21

PSV

- Eredivisie: 2023–24, 2024–25, 2025–26
- Johan Cruyff Shield: 2025

United States U20

- CONCACAF U-20 Championship: 2018

United States

- CONCACAF Nations League: 2019–20, 2022–23, 2023–24

Individual

- CONCACAF U-20 Championship Best XI: 2018
- U.S. Soccer Young Male Athlete of the Year: 2019
- Ajax Talent of the Year (Marco van Basten Award): 2020
- IFFHS Men's World Youth (U20) Team: 2020
- IFFHS Men's CONCACAF Team of the Year: 2020, 2022, 2025
