= National Innovation Council (India) =

National Innovation Council is the think-tank council of India to discuss, analyse and help implement strategies for innovation in India and suggest a Roadmap for Innovation 2010–2020. It is currently headed by no one as its incumbent chairman Sam Pitroda has resigned. It has approved Vadodara Innovation Council as its first city-based innovation council in India.

== See also ==
- Ideawicket
- Indovation
- Vadodara Innovation Council
