= 2020–21 FC Barcelona season =

122nd season in existence of FC Barcelona

Barcelona
2020–21 season
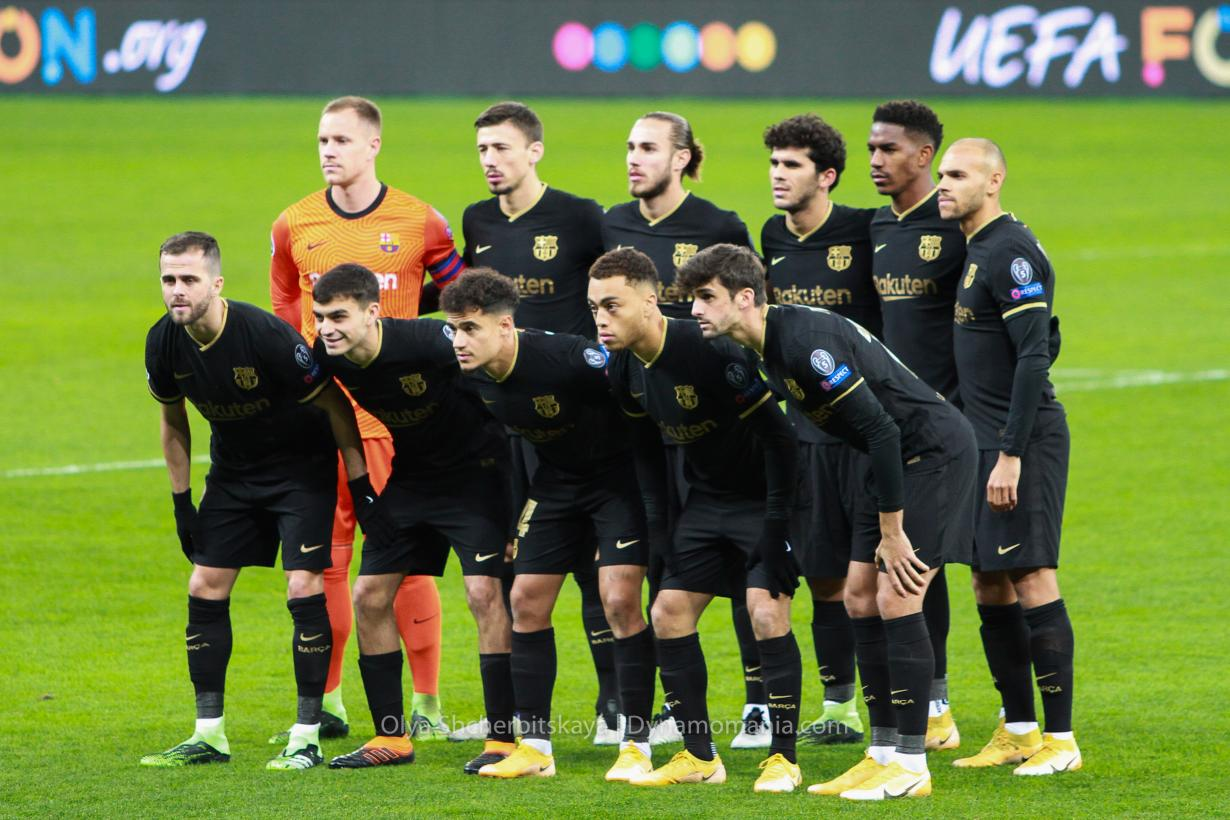
- Barcelona players line up before facing Dynamo Kiev on 24 November 2020
- President: Josep Maria Bartomeu (until 27 October 2020); Carles Tusquets (interim; from 28 October 2020 until 7 March 2021); Joan Laporta (from 7 March 2021)
- Head coach: Ronald Koeman
- Stadium: Camp Nou
- La Liga: 3rd
- Copa del Rey: Winners
- Supercopa de España: Runners-up
- UEFA Champions League: Round of 16
- Top goalscorer: League: Lionel Messi (30); All: Lionel Messi (38)
- Biggest win: 1–6 vs Real Sociedad
- Biggest defeat: 0–3 vs Juventus; 1–4 vs Paris Saint-Germain
Home colours	Away colours	Third colours

The 2020–21 season was the 122nd season in the existence of Futbol Club Barcelona and its 91st consecutive season in the top flight of Spanish football. In addition to the domestic league, Barcelona participated in this season's editions of the Copa del Rey, the Supercopa de España, and the UEFA Champions League. The season covered the period from 15 August 2020 to 30 June 2021, with the late start to the season due to the COVID-19 pandemic. The season was their first since 2013–14 without Luis Suárez and Ivan Rakitić, who are respectively departed to Atlético Madrid and Sevilla.

Coming off a disastrous 2019–20 season, which not only ended trophyless for the first time in 12 years, but also produced a humiliating 8–2 defeat to Bayern München in the Champions League, Barcelona looked to bounce back. Ronald Koeman was brought in as manager in place of Quique Setién, and he immediately emphasized his strive to reform the squad, underscored by the aforementioned departure of Suárez to Atlético Madrid. This season saw Barça win a record-extending 31st Copa del Rey and fight until the end for the La Liga title, although several stumbles near the finish line meant they finished third, their lowest league position since 2007–08. In the Champions League, Barcelona finished second in their group and then lost to PSG in the round of 16, breaking their streak of 13 consecutive quarter-final appearances in the competition.

Although not known at the time, this season ended up being Lionel Messi's last at Barcelona. He scored his last goal for the club in his last game, which Barça lost 1–2 to Celta Vigo on 16 May 2021.

== Kits ==
Home	Away	Third	Third alt.	Third alt. 2	Fourth (2019–20)	'Clásico'
Goalkeeper 1	Goalkeeper 2	Goalkeeper 3	Goalkeeper 4	Goalkeeper 5

Barcelona utilized five sets of kits (excluding variations) throughout the season, a club record. This included a fourth Senyera stripe from the previous season and a 'special' Clásico kit which ended up being used against Real Madrid and Atlético Madrid in the second half of the season.

== Season overview ==
=== August ===
On 17 August, Quique Setién was dismissed as the first team head coach after only seven months in charge.

On 19 August, the club announced that Ronald Koeman would be the new head coach until 30 June 2022.

=== September ===
On 1 September, Barcelona reached an agreement with Sevilla FC for the transfer of Ivan Rakitić for €1.5 million plus €9 million in variables.

On 21 September, Barcelona reached an agreement with PAOK FC for the transfer of Moussa Wagué on loan for the rest of the season without a buy option.

On 22 September, Barcelona reached an agreement with Inter Milan for the free transfer of Arturo Vidal with €1 million in variables.

On 23 September, Barcelona announced the transfer of Nélson Semedo to Wolverhampton Wanderers F.C. for a fee of €30 million plus €10 million in variables. On the same day, Barça announced that the club had reached an agreement with Atlético Madrid for the departure of Luis Suárez on a free transfer with €6 million in variables.

On 27 September, Barcelona won their La Liga opener in a 4–0 home win against Villarreal CF. A brace from Ansu Fati, a penalty from Lionel Messi, and an own goal from Pau Torres gave Barça the victory.

=== October ===
On 1 October, Barcelona announced the signing of Sergiño Dest from AFC Ajax for a fee of €21 million plus €5 million in variables. Later that same day, Barça defeated Celta de Vigo 3–0 away from home. Another goal from Ansu Fati, a Lucas Olaza own goal, and a late goal from Sergi Roberto sealed the victory for the Blaugrana, ending a five-year winless streak at the Balaídos.

On 4 October, Barcelona drew 1–1 with Sevilla at home. Luuk de Jong got the visitors off the mark but Philippe Coutinho equalized for the home side shortly after.

On 5 October, Barcelona reached an agreement with S.L. Benfica for the loan of Jean-Clair Todibo with an option to buy for €20 million. The club also announced the departure of Rafinha to Paris Saint-Germain on a free transfer.

On 17 October, Barcelona lost 1–0 to Getafe CF away from home. Jaime Mata scored from the penalty spot to inflict Barça's first defeat of the season.

On 20 October, Barcelona beat Ferencváros 5–1 in their first Champions League game of the season. Goals from Lionel Messi, Ansu Fati, Philippe Coutinho, Pedri, and Ousmane Dembélé ensured victory for the Blaugrana. Later that day, Barça announced the contract extensions of Gerard Piqué until 2024, Marc-André ter Stegen until 2025, Frenkie de Jong and Clément Lenglet until 2026.

On 24 October, Barcelona lost 3–1 at home to rivals Real Madrid in El Clásico. Federico Valverde got the visitors off the mark early into the match but Ansu Fati equalized shortly after, in the process becoming the second youngest goalscorer in El Clásico history and scoring Barça's 400th goal in the fixture's history. Sergio Ramos scored from the penalty spot after a controversial penalty decision and Luka Modrić sealed the game off for Los Blancos.

On 27 October, President Josep Maria Bartomeu announced his resignation and the resignation of his board of directors, after six years of being the head of the club.

On 28 October, Barcelona announced that Carles Tusquets would be the interim club president until elections were held. Later that same day, Barça defeated Juventus 2–0 away from home in the Champions League. Goals from Dembélé and Messi gave Barça the victory.

On 31 October, Barcelona drew 1–1 with Deportivo Alavés. Luis Rioja would take advantage of a mix-up between Gerard Piqué and Neto to put the home side 1–0 up. Antoine Griezmann would equalize in the second-half and score his first goal of the season.

=== November ===
On 4 November, Barcelona defeated Dynamo Kyiv 2–1 at home in the Champions League. An early goal from Messi and a header from Piqué ensured victory for Barça.

On 7 November, Barcelona defeated Real Betis 5–2 at home. Goals from Dembélé, Griezmann, Pedri and a brace from Messi gave Barça the win.

On 21 November, Barcelona lost 1–0 to Atlético Madrid away from home. Yannick Carrasco scored the only goal after taking advantage of a mistake from Marc-André ter Stegen.

On 24 November, Barcelona defeated Dynamo Kyiv 4–0 away from home in the Champions League. Sergiño Dest scored his first goal for Barcelona, Martin Braithwaite scored a brace, and Griezmann came off the bench to finish the game off.

On 30 November, Barcelona defeated Osasuna 4–0 at home. Braithwaite, Griezmann, Coutinho and Messi were the goalscorers.

=== December ===
On 2 December, Barcelona defeated Ferencváros 3–0 away from home in the Champions League. First half goals from Griezmann, Braithwaite and Dembélé were enough to secure a comfortable victory.

On 5 December, Barcelona lost to Cádiz CF 2–1 away from home in the league. Álvaro Giménez scored first for the home side but Barça drew level with an own goal from Pedro Alcalá. The Andalusians went back in front after Álvaro Negredo came off the bench to score the winner.

On 8 December, Barcelona lost to Juventus 3–0 at home in the Champions League after conceding two penalties converted by Cristiano Ronaldo and a goal from Weston McKennie. As a result, Barcelona finished 2nd in Champions League Group G.

On 13 December, Barcelona defeated Levante 1–0 at home. Messi scored the only goal in the game.

On 16 December, Barcelona defeated Real Sociedad 2–1 at home. Jordi Alba and Frenkie de Jong scored for Barça after trailing by one goal.

On 19 December, Barcelona drew 2–2 with Valencia at home. Lionel Messi and Ronald Araújo were the goalscorers for Barça.

On 22 December, Barcelona defeated Real Valladolid 3–0 away from home. Lenglet, Braithwaite and Messi were the goalscorers. Messi surpassed Pelé as the highest goalscorer for a single club with his goal against Valladolid.

On 29 December, Barcelona drew 1–1 with Eibar at home. Kike got the visitors off the mark after taking advantage of an error by Araújo. Dembélé came off the bench to score the equalizer.

=== January ===
On 3 January, Barcelona defeated Huesca 1–0 away from home. De Jong scored the only goal in the game.

On 6 January, Barcelona and Getafe reached an agreement for the loan of Carles Aleñá for the remainder of the season. Later that same day, Barcelona defeated Athletic Bilbao 3–2 away from home. Iñaki Williams gave an early lead for the home side but Pedri equalized with a header. Messi sealed victory for Barça by scoring two goals.

On 9 January, Barcelona defeated Granada 4–0 away from home. Braces from Griezmann and Messi earned a comfortable victory for Barça.

On 13 January, Barcelona defeated Real Sociedad in a penalty shoot-out 2–3 in the Supercopa de España after the score ended 1–1 during regulation time and extra time. Frenkie de Jong put Barça in the lead after converting a header, but Mikel Oyarzabal equalized for La Real in the second half. Ter Stegen would go on to save two penalties in the shoot-out and Riqui Puig stepped up and scored the decisive penalty to send the Catalans to the final.

On 17 January, Barcelona lost 3–2 to Athletic Bilbao in the Supercopa de España final. Antoine Griezmann struck first and put Barça in the lead but Óscar de Marcos quickly equalized. Griezmann would later score again, but Asier Villalibre scored in the final minute to make the score 2–2 and send the match into extra time. Iñaki Williams scored at the start of extra time and Los Leones won the Super Cup. The game also featured Lionel Messi's first red card while playing for FC Barcelona.

On 21 January, Barcelona defeated Cornellà 2–0 away from home in the Copa del Rey. Dembélé and Braithwaite scored the goals in extra time.

On 24 January, Barcelona defeated Elche 2–0 at the Estadio Manuel Martínez Valero. Frenkie de Jong and Riqui Puig scored for the Blaugrana. The latter also scored his first goal for the first team.

On 27 January, Barcelona defeated Rayo Vallecano 2–1 away from home in Copa del Rey round of 16. Rayo took the lead in the 63rd minute, but Barça came-back with goals from Messi and De Jong.

On 31 January, Barça defeated Athletic Bilbao 2–1 at home in La Liga. Messi scored his 650th for the club and Griezmann scored to claim all three points.

=== February ===
On 1 February, Barcelona announced that the club had reached an agreement with Benfica to terminate the loan of Jean-Clair Todibo. Todibo subsequently joined OGC Nice on loan until the remainder of the season, with an option to buy for €8.5 million.

On 3 February, Barcelona defeated Granada 5–3 away from home in the Copa del Rey quarter-finals. The home side took a 2–0 lead through goals from Kenedy and Roberto Soldado, but Barça came back in the last minutes of the game with goals from Antoine Griezmann and Jordi Alba, forcing extra time. Barça took the lead in the 100th minute of extra time with a header from Griezmann, but Granada soon equalized with a penalty converted by Fede Vico. However, Barça again took the lead with a goal from De Jong, and the game was sealed with a rasping volley from Jordi Alba, assuring passage to the semi-finals.

On 7 February, Barcelona defeated Real Betis 3–2 away from home. The hosts took the lead through Borja Iglesias but a goal from Messi and an own goal from Víctor Ruiz handed Barcelona the lead, until the latter made amends for his own goal by equalizing the game. Francisco Trincão came off the bench to score his first goal for Barça and secure the win.

On 10 February, Barcelona lost to Sevilla 2–0 in the first leg of Copa del Rey semi-finals. Jules Koundé and former Barça player Ivan Rakitić scored the goals for Sevilla.

On 13 February, Barcelona defeated Deportivo Alavés 5–1 at home. Braces from Trincão and Messi and a goal from Junior Firpo led the Blaugrana to victory.

On 16 February, Barcelona lost to Paris Saint-Germain 4–1 at home in the first leg of the Champions League round of 16. Messi scored from the penalty spot to put Barça in the lead but a hat-trick from Kylian Mbappé and a goal from Moise Kean gave the visitors the victory.

On 21 February, Barcelona drew 1–1 with Cádiz at home. Messi scored from the penalty spot to give the lead for Barça but Cádiz drew late with a penalty converted by Álex Fernández.

On 24 February, Barcelona defeated Elche 3–0 at home. A brace from Messi and a goal from Jordi Alba were enough to take all three points.

On 27 February, Barcelona defeated Sevilla 2–0 away from home. Dembélé and Messi were the goalscorers.

=== March ===
On 3 March, Barcelona defeated Sevilla 3–0 (3–2 agg.) in the second leg of Copa del Rey semi-finals. An early goal from Dembélé and a goal from Piqué in the last minute of the game leveled the aggregate score and forced the match into extra time. Martin Braithwaite scored the winning goal in 95th minute to secure a spot in the final.

On 6 March, Barcelona defeated Osasuna 2–0 away from home. Jordi Alba and Ilaix Moriba scored for the Blaugrana, with the latter scoring his first senior goal.

On 7 March, Joan Laporta was elected as the new club president, having previously served as club president from 2003 until 2010.

On 10 March, Barcelona drew 1–1 with Paris Saint-Germain in the second leg of the Champions League round of 16. Kylian Mbappé scored from the penalty spot to put Paris in the lead but Messi equalized for Barça shortly after. With an aggregate score of 5–2, Barcelona were eliminated from the Champions League.

On 15 March, Barcelona defeated Huesca 4–1 at home. A brace from Messi and goals from Griezmann and Óscar Mingueza – with his first senior goal – led the Blaugrana to victory.

On 21 March, Barcelona defeated Real Sociedad 6–1 away from home. Dest and Messi scored braces while Griezmann and Dembélé scored a goal each.

=== April ===
On 5 April, Barcelona defeated Real Valladolid 1–0 at home. Dembélé scored the winning goal in the 90th minute. After this victory Barcelona stood one point away from Atlético, one week before El Clásico. This meant Barcelona had reduced the distance with La Liga's leaders by 11 points since last defeat against Cádiz on December 5, winning 51 of 57 possible points.

On 10 April, Barcelona lost 2–1 to fierce rivals Real Madrid away from home. First half goals came from Karim Benzema and Toni Kroos, and while Óscar Mingueza pulled one back for the Catalans, however it wasn't enough as the visitors lost the first Clásico at the Alfredo Di Stéfano Stadium.

On 17 April, Barcelona won their 31st Copa del Rey after defeating Athletic Bilbao 4–0 in the final. De Jong and Griezmann scored a goal each while Messi scored a brace.

On 22 April, Barcelona released a statement confirming that the Catalan club would be forming a part of a breakaway European Super League, a proposed annual club football competition to be contested by twenty of Europe's most elite football clubs. Later that day, Barça defeated Getafe 5–2 at home. A brace from Messi, a header from Araújo, a penalty converted by Griezmann and an own goal secured victory for the home side.

On 25 April, Barcelona defeated Villarreal 2–1 away from home. A brace from Griezmann in the first half helped turn the tie around for the visitors after being a goal behind.

On 29 April, Barcelona lost 2–1 to Granada at home. Messi gave Barcelona the lead in the first half, but the Blaugrana ended up being the losing side after conceding two goals in the second half from Darwin Machís and Jorge Molina.

=== May ===
On 2 May, Barcelona defeated Valencia 3–2 away from home. A brace from Messi and a goal scored by Griezmann secured victory for the visitors after being a goal behind.

On 8 May, Barcelona drew 0–0 against Atlético Madrid at home.

On 11 May, Barcelona drew 3–3 against Levante away from home. Goals from Messi and Pedri gave Barça a two-goal lead in the first half, but Levante equalized after scoring two goals in two minutes. Barcelona restored the lead with a goal from Dembélé, but the lead was cancelled out again after the home side scored a goal.

On 16 May, Barcelona lost 2–1 to Celta Vigo at home. Messi gave Barcelona the lead, but a brace from Santi Mina won the game for Celta.

On 22 May, Barcelona defeated Eibar 1–0 away from home, with Griezmann scoring the only goal of the game. Barcelona ended the season with a third place finish in La Liga, its lowest since 2007–08.

== Players ==
N	Pos.	Nat.	Name	Age	EU	Since	App	Goals	Ends	Transfer fee	Notes
1	GK	(Germany)	Marc-André ter Stegen	29	EU	2014	278	0	2025	€12M	
2	DF	(United States)	Sergiño Dest	20	EU	2020	41	3	2025	€21M	Second nationality: The Netherlands
3	DF	(Spain)	Gerard Piqué (3rd captain)	34	EU	2008	566	49	2024	€5M	Originally from Youth system
4	DF	(Uruguay)	Ronald Araújo	22	Non-EU	2019	39	2	2023	€1.7M	
5	MF	(Spain)	Sergio Busquets (vice-captain)	32	EU	2008	629	15	2023	Youth system	
7	FW	(France)	Antoine Griezmann	30	EU	2019	99	35	2024	€120M	
8	MF	(Bosnia and Herzegovina)	Miralem Pjanić	31	EU	2020	30	0	2024	€60M	Second nationality: Luxembourg
9	FW	(Denmark)	Martin Braithwaite	29	EU	2020 (Winter)	53	8	2024	€18M	
10	FW	(Argentina)	Lionel Messi (captain)	33	EU	2004	778	672	2021	Youth system	Second nationality: Spain
11	FW	(France)	Ousmane Dembélé	24	EU	2017	118	30	2022	€105M	
12	MF	(Spain)	Riqui Puig	21	EU	2018	39	1	2021	Youth system	
13	GK	(Brazil)	Neto	31	EU	2019	17	0	2023	€26M	Second nationality: Italy
14	MF	(Brazil)	Philippe Coutinho	28	EU	2018 (Winter)	90	24	2023	€120M	Second nationality: Portugal
15	DF	(France)	Clément Lenglet	26	EU	2018	133	7	2026	€35.9M	
16	MF	(Spain)	Pedri	18	EU	2020	52	4	2022	€5M	
17	FW	(Portugal)	Francisco Trincão	21	EU	2020	42	3	2025	€31M	
18	DF	(Spain)	Jordi Alba	32	EU	2012	385	22	2024	€14M	Originally from Youth system
19	MF	(Brazil)	Matheus Fernandes	22	Non-EU	2020	1	0	2025	€7M	
20	DF	(Spain)	Sergi Roberto (4th captain)	29	EU	2010	304	10	2022	Youth system	
21	MF	(Netherlands)	Frenkie de Jong	24	EU	2019	93	9	2026	€75M	
22	FW	(Spain)	Ansu Fati	18	EU	2019	43	13	2022	Youth system	
23	DF	(France)	Samuel Umtiti	27	EU	2016	132	2	2023	€25M	
24	DF	(Spain)	Junior Firpo	24	EU	2019	41	2	2024	€18M	

- Last updated: 22 May 2021
- Source: FCBarcelona.com, LaLiga.es, Players in/out, Wikipedia players' articles, ESPN (for appearances and goals) and footballdatabase.com (for EU passport)

=== From Barcelona B and Youth Academy ===
N	Pos.	Nat.	Name	Age	EU	Since	App	Goals	Ends	Transfer fee	Notes
26	GK	(Spain)	Iñaki Peña	22	EU	2018	0	0	2023	Youth system	
27	MF	(Spain)	Ilaix Moriba	18	EU	2020	18	1	2022	Youth system	
28	DF	(Spain)	Óscar Mingueza	22	EU	2018	39	2	2023	Youth system	
29	FW	(United States)	Konrad de la Fuente	19	EU	2020	3	0	2022	Youth system	Second nationality: Spain
30	MF	(Spain)	Álex Collado	22	EU	2019	2	0	2023	Youth system	
32	DF	(Argentina)	Santiago Ramos Mingo	19	Non-EU	2020	0	0	2022	Free transfer	
36	GK	(Spain)	Arnau Tenas	19	EU	2019	0	0	2023	Youth system	

- Last updated: 22 May 2021
- Source: FCBarcelona.com and UEFA.com

== Transfers ==
=== In ===
No.	Pos	Player	Transferred from	Fee	Date	Source
–	MF	(Spain) Oriol Busquets	(Netherlands) Twente	Loan return	1 July 2020	
–	DF	(Spain) Juan Miranda	(Germany) Schalke 04	Loan return	1 July 2020	
14	MF	(Brazil) Philippe Coutinho	(Germany) Bayern Munich	Loan return	1 July 2020	
12	MF	(Brazil) Rafinha	Celta Vigo	Loan return	1 July 2020	
6	MF	(Spain) Carles Aleñá	Real Betis	Loan return	1 July 2020	
–	DF	(France) Jean-Clair Todibo	(Germany) Schalke 04	Loan return	1 July 2020	
–	DF	(Senegal) Moussa Wagué	(France) Nice	Loan return	1 July 2020	
16	MF	(Spain) Pedri	Las Palmas	€5,000,000	1 July 2020	
17	FW	(Portugal) Francisco Trincão	(Portugal) Braga	€31,000,000	1 July 2020	
19	MF	(Brazil) Matheus Fernandes	(Brazil) Palmeiras	€7,000,000	1 July 2020	
8	MF	(Bosnia and Herzegovina) Miralem Pjanić	(Italy) Juventus	€60,000,000 (Note: Fee may eventually rise to €65,000,000.)	1 July 2020	
2	DF	(United States) Sergiño Dest	(Netherlands) Ajax	€21,000,000 (Note: Fee may eventually rise to €26,000,000.)	1 October 2020	
–	DF	(France) Jean-Clair Todibo	(Portugal) Benfica	Loan return	1 February 2021	
Total					€124,000,000	

=== Out ===
No.	Pos	Player	Transferred to	Fee	Date	Source
–	MF	(Turkey) Arda Turan	(Turkey) Galatasaray	Free transfer	1 July 2020	
8	MF	(Brazil) Arthur	(Italy) Juventus	€72,000,000 (Note: Fee may eventually rise to €82,000,000.)	1 July 2020	
–	FW	(Spain) Carles Pérez	(Italy) Roma	€11,000,000 (Note: Fee may eventually rise to €14,500,000.)	1 July 2020	
–	FW	(Spain) Abel Ruiz	(Portugal) Braga	€8,000,000	1 July 2020	
–	MF	(Spain) Marc Cucurella	Getafe	€10,000,000	1 July 2020	
4	MF	(Croatia) Ivan Rakitić	Sevilla	€1,500,000 (Note: Fee may eventually rise to €10,500,000.)	1 September 2020	
22	MF	(Chile) Arturo Vidal	(Italy) Internazionale	Free transfer (Note: Fee may eventually rise to €1,000,000.)	22 September 2020	
–	DF	(Spain) Jorge Cuenca	Villarreal	€2,500,000 (Note: Fee may eventually rise to €6,500,000.)	22 September 2020	
2	DF	(Portugal) Nélson Semedo	(England) Wolverhampton Wanderers	€30,000,000 (Note: Fee may eventually rise to €40,000,000.)	23 September 2020	
9	FW	(Uruguay) Luis Suárez	Atlético Madrid	Free transfer (Note: Fee may eventually rise to €6,000,000.)	23 September 2020	
12	MF	(Brazil) Rafinha	(France) Paris Saint-Germain	Free transfer (Note: Fee may eventually rise to €3,000,000.)	5 October 2020	
Total					€135,000,000	

=== Loans out ===
No.	Pos	Player	Transferred to	Fee	Start date	End date	Source
–	DF	(Senegal) Moussa Wagué	(Greece) PAOK	None	21 September 2020	End of Season	
–	MF	(Spain) Monchu	Girona	None	22 September 2020	End of Season	
–	DF	(France) Jean-Clair Todibo	(Portugal) Benfica	€2,000,000	5 October 2020	End of Season	
–	DF	(Spain) Juan Miranda	Real Betis	None	5 October 2020	End of Season	
6	MF	(Spain) Carles Aleñá	Getafe	None	6 January 2021	End of Season	
–	DF	(France) Jean-Clair Todibo	(France) Nice	None	1 February 2021	End of Season	
Total						€2,000,000	

=== Transfer summary ===
Undisclosed fees are not included in the transfer totals.

Expenditure

Summer: ▼€124,000,000

Winter: ▼€0,000,000

Total: ▼€124,000,000

Income

Summer: ▲€137,000,000

Winter: ▲€0,000,000

Total: ▲€137,000,000

Net totals

Summer: ▲€13,000,000

Winter: ▲€000,000

Total: ▲€13,000,000

== Pre-season and friendlies ==
Win Draw Loss

12 September 2020 Friendly	Barcelona	3–1	Gimnàstic	Sant Joan Despí, Spain
19:00 CEST (UTC+2)	Dembélé 6'; Busquets (yellow card) 21'; Griezmann 17' (pen.); Coutinho 51' (pen.)	Report	Brugui (yellow card) 13'; Bonilla 31', (yellow card) 36'	Stadium: Johan Cruyff Stadium; Referee: Albert Ávalos Martos

16 September 2020 Friendly	Barcelona	3–1	Girona	Sant Joan Despí, Spain
19:00 CEST (UTC+2)	Coutinho 21'; Messi 45', 51'	Report	Sáiz 46'	Stadium: Johan Cruyff Stadium; Referee: Albert Catalá Ferrán

19 September 2020 Joan Gamper Trophy	Barcelona	1–0	Elche	Barcelona, Spain
19:00 CEST (UTC+2)	Griezmann 2'; Lenglet (yellow card) 58'	Report	Moreno (yellow card) 84'	Stadium: Camp Nou; Referee: Carlos Calderiña Pavón

== Competitions ==
=== Overall record ===
Competition	First match	Last match	Starting round	Final position	Record							
Competition	First match	Last match	Starting round	Final position	Pld	W	D	L	GF	GA	GD	Win %
La Liga	27 September 2020	22 May 2021	Matchday 1	3rd	38	24	7	7	85	38	+47	63.16
Copa del Rey	21 January 2021	17 April 2021	Round of 32	Winners	6	5	0	1	16	6	+10	83.33
Supercopa de España	13 January 2021	17 January 2021	Semi-finals	Runners-up	2	0	1	1	3	4	−1	0.00
UEFA Champions League	20 October 2020	10 March 2021	Group stage	Round of 16	8	5	1	2	18	10	+8	62.50
Total					54	34	9	11	122	58	+64	62.96

Source: Soccerway

=== La Liga ===
==== League table ====
Pos	Team	Pld	W	D	L	GF	GA	GD	Pts	Qualification or relegation
1	Atlético Madrid (C)	38	26	8	4	67	25	+42	86	Qualification for the Champions League group stage
2	Real Madrid	38	25	9	4	67	28	+39	84	Qualification for the Champions League group stage
3	Barcelona	38	24	7	7	85	38	+47	79	Qualification for the Champions League group stage
4	Sevilla	38	24	5	9	53	33	+20	77	Qualification for the Champions League group stage
5	Real Sociedad	38	17	11	10	59	38	+21	62	Qualification for the Europa League group stage (Note: Since the winners of the 2020–21 Copa del Rey, Barcelona, qualified for the 2021–22 UEFA Champions League based on league position, the spot awarded to the cup winners (Europa League group stage) was passed to the sixth-placed team, and the spot awarded to the sixth-placed team (2021–22 UEFA Europa Conference League play-off round) was passed to the seventh-placed team, Villarreal.)

Source: La Liga
Rules for classification: 1) Points; 2) Head-to-head points; 3) Head-to-head goal difference; 4) Goal difference; 5) Goals scored; 6) Fair-play points (Note: Head-to-head record is used only after all the matches between the teams in question have been played)
(C) Champions

==== Results summary ====
Overall								Home						Away					
Pld	W	D	L	GF	GA	GD	Pts	W	D	L	GF	GA	GD	W	D	L	GF	GA	GD
38	24	7	7	85	38	+47	79	11	5	3	44	20	+24	13	2	4	41	18	+23

Source: La Liga

==== Matches ====
The league fixtures were announced on 31 August 2020.

27 September 2020 3	Barcelona	4–0	Villarreal	Barcelona
21:00 CEST (UTC+2)	Fati 15', 19'; Messi 35' (pen.); Torres 45' (o.g.)	Report	Gerard (yellow card) 83'	Stadium: Camp Nou; Attendance: 0 (Note: The match was played behind closed doors due to the COVID-19 pandemic in Spain.); Referee: Guillermo Cuadra Fernández

1 October 2020 4	Celta Vigo	0–3	Barcelona	Vigo
21:30 CEST (UTC+2)	Aidoo (yellow card) 39'; Araujo (yellow card) 48'; Tapia (yellow card) 69'; Murillo (yellow card) 75'; Beltrán (yellow card) 90+3'	Report	Fati 11'; Lenglet (yellow card) 23' (yellow-red card) 42'; Piqué (yellow card) 42'; Olaza 51' (o.g.); Alba (yellow card) 84'; Busquets (yellow card) 87'; Roberto 90+5'	Stadium: Balaídos; Attendance: 0 Referee: Carlos del Cerro Grande

4 October 2020 5	Barcelona	1–1	Sevilla	Barcelona
21:00 CEST (UTC+2)	Coutinho 10'; Pjanić (yellow card) 77'	Report	De Jong 8'; Gudelj (yellow card) 87'	Stadium: Camp Nou; Attendance: 0 Referee: Jesús Gil Manzano

17 October 2020 6	Getafe	1–0	Barcelona	Getafe
21:00 CEST (UTC+2)	Mata (yellow card) 27', (goal) 56' (pen.); Cabaco (yellow card) 28'; Nyom (yellow card) 73'; Olivera (yellow card) 90+3'	Report	Piqué (yellow card) 24'; Roberto (yellow card) 41'; Dest (yellow card) 90+7'	Stadium: Coliseum Alfonso Pérez; Attendance: 0 Referee: César Soto Grado

24 October 2020 7	Barcelona	1–3	Real Madrid	Barcelona
16:00 CEST (UTC+2)	Fati 8'; Lenglet (yellow card) 29'; Alba (yellow card) 62'; Messi (yellow card) 90+1'	Report	Valverde 5'; Casemiro (yellow card) 19'; Nacho (yellow card) 37'; Ramos 63' (pen.); Modrić 90'	Stadium: Camp Nou; Attendance: 0 Referee: Juan Martínez Munuera

31 October 2020 8	Alavés	1–1	Barcelona	Vitoria-Gasteiz
21:00 CET (UTC+1)	Jota (yellow card) 15' (yellow-red card) 62'; Deyverson (yellow card) 22'; Rioja 31'; Duarte (yellow card) 87'	Report	Messi (yellow card) 39'; Lenglet (yellow card) 44'; Busquets (yellow card) 44'; Griezmann 63'	Stadium: Mendizorrotza; Attendance: 0 Referee: Alejandro Hernández Hernández

7 November 2020 9	Barcelona	5–2	Real Betis	Barcelona
16:15 CET (UTC+1)	Dembélé 22'; Griezmann (penalty missed) 33', 49'; Fati (yellow card) 37'; Pedri (yellow card) 41', (goal) 90'; Messi 61' (pen.), 82'	Report	Mandi (yellow card) 32', (red card) 60'; Moreno (yellow card) 45'; Sanabria 45+2'; Loren 73'	Stadium: Camp Nou; Attendance: 0 Referee: Guillermo Cuadra Fernández

21 November 2020 10	Atlético Madrid	1–0	Barcelona	Madrid
21:00 CET (UTC+1)	Koke (yellow card) 9'; Carrasco (yellow card) 26', (goal) 45+3'; Savić (yellow card) 79'; Giménez (yellow card) 80'	Report		Stadium: Wanda Metropolitano; Attendance: 0 Referee: José Luis Munuera Montero

29 November 2020 11	Barcelona	4–0	Osasuna	Barcelona
14:00 CET (UTC+1)	Braithwaite 29'; Griezmann 42'; Coutinho 57'; Messi 73', (yellow card) 74'	Report		Stadium: Camp Nou; Attendance: 0 Referee: Antonio Mateu Lahoz

5 December 2020 12	Cádiz	2–1	Barcelona	Cádiz
21:00 CET (UTC+1)	Giménez 8'; Negredo 63'	Report	Alcalá 57' (o.g.); Lenglet (yellow card) 61'; Alba (yellow card) 86'	Stadium: Ramón de Carranza; Attendance: 0 Referee: César Soto Grado

13 December 2020 13	Barcelona	1–0	Levante	Barcelona
21:00 CET (UTC+1)	De Jong (yellow card) 49'; Messi 76'; Braithwaite (yellow card) 87'	Report	Vukčević (yellow card) 42'	Stadium: Camp Nou; Attendance: 0 Referee: Ricardo de Burgos Bengoetxea

16 December 2020 19	Barcelona	2–1	Real Sociedad	Barcelona
21:00 CET (UTC+1)	Alba 31'; Busquets (yellow card) 41'; De Jong 43'; Trincão (yellow card) 88'; Aleñá (yellow card) 90+3'	Report	Januzaj (yellow card) 20'; Willian José 27'; Barrenetxea (yellow card) 58'; Le Normand (yellow card) 80'	Stadium: Camp Nou; Attendance: 0 Referee: José María Sánchez Martínez
Note: The match originally scheduled for 20 January 2021, but brought forward due to the teams involvement in the Supercopa de España.

19 December 2020 14	Barcelona	2–2	Valencia	Barcelona
16:15 CET (UTC+1)	Griezmann (yellow card) 13'; Messi (penalty missed) 45+4', 45+4'; Araújo 52'; Mingueza (yellow card) 56'; Alba (yellow card) 90+1'; Lenglet (yellow card) 90+2'	Report	Diakhaby 29'; Gayà (yellow card) 45+4'; Blanco (yellow card) 45+7'; Gómez 69'	Stadium: Camp Nou; Attendance: 0 Referee: Alejandro Hernández Hernández

22 December 2020 15	Valladolid	0–3	Barcelona	Valladolid
22:00 CET (UTC+1)	Joaquín (yellow card) 77'	Report	Lenglet 21'; Braithwaite 35'; Alba (yellow card) 62'; Messi 65'; De Jong (yellow card) 68'	Stadium: José Zorrilla; Attendance: 0 Referee: Mario Melero López

29 December 2020 16	Barcelona	1–1	Eibar	Barcelona
19:15 CET (UTC+1)	Braithwaite (penalty missed) 8'; Dembélé 67'	Report	Kike 57'; Álvarez (yellow card) 75'; Recio (yellow card) 83'	Stadium: Camp Nou; Attendance: 0 Referee: Javier Alberola Rojas

3 January 2021 17	Huesca	0–1	Barcelona	Huesca
21:00 CET (UTC+1)	Ontiveros (yellow card) 84'	Report	De Jong 27'	Stadium: El Alcoraz; Attendance: 0 Referee: Guillermo Cuadra Fernández

6 January 2021 2	Athletic Bilbao	2–3	Barcelona	Bilbao
21:00 CET (UTC+1)	Williams 3'; Vesga (yellow card) 27'; D. García (yellow card) 70'; Muniain 90'	Report	Pedri 14'; Messi 38', 62'; Lenglet (yellow card) 57'	Stadium: San Mamés; Attendance: 0 Referee: Carlos del Cerro Grande
Note: Match originally scheduled for 19 September 2020, but postponed due the delayed conclusion of the knockout phase of the UEFA Champions League.

9 January 2021 18	Granada	0–4	Barcelona	Granada
18:30 CET (UTC+1)	Soldado (yellow card) 45'; Suárez (yellow card) 74'; Vallejo (red card) 78'	Report	Griezmann 12', 63'; Messi 35', 42'; Mingueza (yellow card) 49'; Busquets (yellow card) 82'; Alba (yellow card) 87'	Stadium: Nuevo Los Cármenes; Attendance: 0 Referee: Ricardo de Burgos Bengoetxea

24 January 2021 20	Elche	0–2	Barcelona	Elche
16:15 CET (UTC+1)		Report	De Jong 39'; Busquets (yellow card) 68'; Griezmann (yellow card) 84'; Puig 89'	Stadium: Martínez Valero; Attendance: 0 Referee: Valentín Pizarro Gómez

31 January 2021 21	Barcelona	2–1	Athletic Bilbao	Barcelona
21:00 CET (UTC+1)	Messi 20'; De Jong (yellow card) 47'; Alba (yellow card) 51'; Griezmann 74'	Report	R. García (yellow card) 32'; Yeray (yellow card) 39'; Alba 49' (o.g.); Capa (yellow card) 77'	Stadium: Camp Nou; Attendance: 0 Referee: Antonio Mateu Lahoz

7 February 2021 22	Real Betis	2–3	Barcelona	Seville
21:00 CET (UTC+1)	Iglesias 38'; Ruiz 75', (yellow card) 77'	Report	De Jong (yellow card) 47'; Messi 59'; Dembélé (yellow card) 64'; Ruiz 68' (o.g.); Busquets (yellow card) 74'; Trincão 87'	Stadium: Benito Villamarín; Attendance: 0 Referee: Carlos del Cerro Grande

13 February 2021 23	Barcelona	5–1	Alavés	Barcelona
21:00 CET (UTC+1)	Trincão 29', 74'; Messi 45+1', 75'; Firpo 80'	Report	Aguirregabiria (yellow card) 17'; Tachi (yellow card) 53'; Rioja 57'	Stadium: Camp Nou; Attendance: 0 Referee: Jorge Figueroa Vázquez

21 February 2021 24	Barcelona	1–1	Cádiz	Barcelona
14:00 CET (UTC+1)	Messi 32' (pen.)	Report	Alejo (yellow card) 82'; José Mari (yellow card) 85'; Fernández 89' (pen.)	Stadium: Camp Nou; Attendance: 0 Referee: Juan Martínez Munuera

24 February 2021 1	Barcelona	3–0	Elche	Barcelona
19:00 CET (UTC+1)	Messi 48', 68'; Alba 73'	Report		Stadium: Camp Nou; Attendance: 0 Referee: Isidro Díaz de Mera Escuderos
Note: Match originally scheduled for 13 September 2020, but postponed due to the delayed conclusion of last season's UEFA club competitions.

27 February 2021 25	Sevilla	0–2	Barcelona	Seville
16:15 CET (UTC+1)	Fernando (yellow card) 31'; Diego Carlos (yellow card) 38'; Escudero (yellow card) 45'; Rekik (yellow card) 46'; Jordán (yellow card) 88'	Report	Dembélé 29', (yellow card) 82'; Messi (yellow card) 42', (goal) 85'	Stadium: Ramón Sánchez Pizjuán; Attendance: 0 Referee: Alejandro Hernández Hernández

6 March 2021 26	Osasuna	0–2	Barcelona	Pamplona
21:00 CET (UTC+1)		Report	Umtiti (yellow card) 26'; Alba 30'; Moriba 83'; Firpo (yellow card) 88'	Stadium: El Sadar; Attendance: 0 Referee: Guillermo Cuadra Fernández

15 March 2021 27	Barcelona	4–1	Huesca	Barcelona
21:00 CET (UTC+1)	Messi 13', 90'; Griezmann 35'; Mingueza 53'	Report	Mir 45+4' (pen.); Escriche (yellow card) 48'; Insua (yellow card) 61'	Stadium: Camp Nou; Attendance: 0 Referee: Adrián Cordero Vega

21 March 2021 28	Real Sociedad	1–6	Barcelona	San Sebastián
21:00 CET (UTC+1)	Zubimendi (yellow card) 9'; Barrenetxea 77'; Zubeldia (yellow card) 79'; Fernández (yellow card) 90+4'	Report	Busquets (yellow card) 27'; Griezmann 37'; Dest 43', 53'; Messi 56', 89'; Dembélé 71'; Braithwaite (yellow card) 88'	Stadium: Anoeta; Attendance: 0 Referee: José Luis Munuera Montero

5 April 2021 29	Barcelona	1–0	Valladolid	Barcelona
21:00 CEST (UTC+2)	Griezmann (yellow card) 28'; Mingueza (yellow card) 43'; Braithwaite (yellow card) 84'; Dembélé 90'	Report	Bruno (yellow card) 40'; Guardiola (yellow card) 73'; Plano (red card) 79'; Masip (yellow card) 80'	Stadium: Camp Nou; Attendance: 0 Referee: Santiago Jaime Latre

10 April 2021 30	Real Madrid	2–1	Barcelona	Madrid
21:00 CEST (UTC+2)	Benzema 13'; Kroos 28'; Nacho (yellow card) 69'; Casemiro (yellow card) 89' (yellow-red card) 90'	Report	Pedri (yellow card) 23'; Araújo (yellow card) 26'; Mingueza 60'; Alba (yellow card) 84'	Stadium: Alfredo Di Stéfano; Attendance: 0 Referee: Jesús Gil Manzano

22 April 2021 31	Barcelona	5–2	Getafe	Barcelona
22:00 CEST (UTC+2)	Lenglet (yellow card) 6'; Messi 8', 33'; Chakla 28' (o.g.); Araújo (yellow card) 68', (goal) 87'; Griezmann 90+3' (pen.)	Report	Lenglet 12' (o.g.); Ünal 69' (pen.)	Stadium: Camp Nou; Attendance: 0 Referee: Jorge Figueroa Vázquez

25 April 2021 32	Villarreal	1–2	Barcelona	Villarreal
16:15 CEST (UTC+2)	Chukwueze 26'; Trigueros (red card) 65'; Albiol (yellow card) 66'; Torres (yellow card) 74'	Report	Griezmann 28', 35', (yellow card) 50'; Busquets (yellow card) 82'; Mingueza (yellow card) 90+3'	Stadium: Estadio de la Cerámica; Attendance: 0 Referee: Carlos del Cerro Grande

29 April 2021 33	Barcelona	1–2	Granada	Barcelona
19:00 CEST (UTC+2)	Messi 23'	Report	Soldado (yellow card) 20'; Pérez (yellow card) 43'; Machís 63'; Molina 79'; Germán (yellow card) 89'; Marín (yellow card) 90+4'	Stadium: Camp Nou; Attendance: 0 Referee: Pablo González Fuertes

2 May 2021 34	Valencia	2–3	Barcelona	Valencia
21:00 CEST (UTC+2)	Račić (yellow card) 35'; Gabriel 50'; Lato (yellow card) 56'; Soler 83'	Report	Messi (penalty missed) 57', 57', 69'; Griezmann 63'; Ter Stegen (yellow card) 65'	Stadium: Mestalla; Attendance: 0 Referee: José María Sánchez Martínez

8 May 2021 35	Barcelona	0–0	Atlético Madrid	Barcelona
16:15 CEST (UTC+2)	Moriba (yellow card) 58'; Alba (yellow card) 82'; Piqué (yellow card) 82'	Report	Saúl (yellow card) 35'; Felipe (yellow card) 46'; Koke (yellow card) 65'	Stadium: Camp Nou; Attendance: 0 Referee: Antonio Mateu Lahoz

11 May 2021 36	Levante	3–3	Barcelona	Valencia
22:00 CEST (UTC+2)	Melero 57'; Morales 59', (yellow card) 78'; De Frutos (yellow card) 67'; León 83'	Report	Messi 25'; Pedri 34'; Dembélé 64'; De Jong (yellow card) 77'; Lenglet (yellow card) 90+1'	Stadium: Ciutat de València; Attendance: 0 Referee: José Luis Munuera Montero

16 May 2021 37	Barcelona	1–2	Celta Vigo	Barcelona
18:30 CEST (UTC+2)	Messi 28'; Puig (yellow card) 56'; Lenglet (yellow card) 73' (yellow-red card) 83'	Report	Mina 38', 89'; Domínguez (yellow card) 51'; Méndez (yellow card) 89'	Stadium: Camp Nou; Attendance: 0 Referee: Ricardo de Burgos Bengoetxea

22 May 2021 38	Eibar	0–1	Barcelona	Eibar
18:00 CEST (UTC+2)		Report	Firpo (yellow card) 23'; Busquets (yellow card) 74'; Araújo (yellow card) 78'; Griezmann 81'	Stadium: Ipurua; Attendance: 0 Referee: Santiago Jaime Latre

=== Copa del Rey ===
==== Round of 32 ====
21 January 2021 Round of 32	Cornellà	0–2 (a.e.t.)	Barcelona	Cornellà
21:00 CET (UTC+1)	Estellés (yellow card) 38' (yellow-red card) 118'; Presa (yellow card) 57'; Medina (yellow card) 96'	Report	Puig (yellow card) 7'; Pjanić (penalty missed) 39’, (yellow card) 106'; Dembélé (penalty missed) 80', 92'; Braithwaite 120+1'	Stadium: Nou Camp Municipal; Referee: César Soto Grado

==== Round of 16 ====
27 January 2021 Round of 16	Rayo Vallecano	1–2	Barcelona	Madrid
21:00 CET (UTC+1)	Comesaña (yellow card) 10'; Trejo (yellow card) 55'; García 63'; Suárez (yellow card) 89'	Report	Messi 70'; Dembélé (yellow card) 73'; De Jong 80'; Braithwaite (yellow card) 90+1'	Stadium: Vallecas; Referee: Guillermo Cuadra Fernández

==== Quarter-finals ====
3 February 2021 Quarter-finals	Granada	3–5 (a.e.t.)	Barcelona	Granada
21:00 CET (UTC+1)	Eteki (yellow card) 29'; Kenedy 33'; Soldado 47'; Germán (yellow card) 77'; Montoro (yellow card) 90+3'; Vico 103' (pen.); Vallejo (yellow card) 119'	Report	Messi (yellow card) 25'; Griezmann 88', 100'; Alba 90+2', 113', (yellow card) 103'; De Jong 108'	Stadium: Nuevo Los Cármenes; Referee: José María Sánchez Martínez

==== Semi-finals ====
10 February 2021 Semi-finals; First leg	Sevilla	2–0	Barcelona	Seville
21:00 CET (UTC+1)	Koundé 25'; Jordán (yellow card) 64'; Escudero (yellow card) 66'; Vidal (yellow card) 84'; Rakitić 85'	Report	Alba (yellow card) 45+2'	Stadium: Ramón Sánchez Pizjuán; Referee: Antonio Mateu Lahoz

3 March 2021 Semi-finals; Second leg	Barcelona	3–0 (a.e.t.) (3–2 agg.)	Sevilla	Barcelona
21:00 CET (UTC+1)	Dembélé 12'; Mingueza (yellow card) 67'; Messi (yellow card) 73'; Piqué 90+4'; Braithwaite 95'; Trincão (yellow card) 119'	Report	Fernando (yellow card) 37' (yellow-red card) 90+2'; Ocampos (penalty missed) 73’; Jordán (yellow card) 100'; Koundé (yellow card) 101'; En-Nesyri (yellow card) 103'; De Jong (red card) 103'	Stadium: Camp Nou; Referee: José María Sánchez Martínez
Note: Luuk de Jong was sent off for dissent after being substituted.

==== Final ====
17 April 2021 Final	Athletic Bilbao	0–4	Barcelona	Seville
21:30 CEST (UTC+2)	D. García (yellow card) 39'; Berchiche (yellow card) 90'	Report	Griezmann 60'; De Jong 63'; Messi 68', 72'	Stadium: La Cartuja; Attendance: 0 Referee: Juan Martínez Munuera

=== Supercopa de España ===
The draw was held on 17 December 2020.

13 January 2021 Semi-finals	Real Sociedad	1–1 (a.e.t.) (2–3 p)	Barcelona	Córdoba
21:00 CET (UTC+1)	Oyarzabal 51' (pen.); Le Normand (yellow card) 58'	Report	De Jong 39'; Dembélé (yellow card) 54'; Mingueza (yellow card) 97'	Stadium: Estadio Nuevo Arcángel; Attendance: 0 Referee: José Luis Munuera Montero
	Penalties
	Bautista (penalty missed); Oyarzabal (penalty missed); Willian José (penalty missed); Merino (penalty scored); Januzaj (penalty scored)		(penalty missed) De Jong; (penalty scored) Dembélé; (penalty scored) Pjanić; (penalty missed) Griezmann; (penalty scored) Puig

17 January 2021 Final	Barcelona	2–3 (a.e.t.)	Athletic Bilbao	Seville
21:00 CET (UTC+1)	Lenglet (yellow card) 11'; Griezmann 40', 77'; Alba (yellow card) 112'; Messi (red card) 120+1'	Report	De Marcos 42'; D. García (yellow card) 67'; Villalibre 90', (yellow card) 108'; Williams 93'; Morcillo (yellow card) 109'	Stadium: La Cartuja; Attendance: 0 Referee: Jesús Gil Manzano

=== UEFA Champions League ===
==== Group stage ====
The group stage draw was held on 1 October 2020.

Pos	Team	Pld	W	D	L	GF	GA	GD	Pts	Qualification	JUV	BAR	DKV	FER
1	(Italy) Juventus	6	5	0	1	14	4	+10	15 (Note: Tied on head-to-head points (3). Head-to-head goal difference: Juventus +1, Barcelona –1.)	Advance to knockout phase	—	0–2	3–0	2–1
2	(Spain) Barcelona	6	5	0	1	16	5	+11	15	Advance to knockout phase	0–3	—	2–1	5–1
3	(Ukraine) Dynamo Kyiv	6	1	1	4	4	13	−9	4	Transfer to Europa League	0–2	0–4	—	1–0
4	(Hungary) Ferencváros	6	0	1	5	5	17	−12	1		1–4	0–3	2–2	—

Source: UEFA
Rules for classification: Group stage tiebreakers
Notes:

20 October 2020 1	Barcelona (Spain)	5–1	(Hungary) Ferencváros	Barcelona, Spain
21:00 CEST (UTC+2)	Messi 27' (pen.); Fati 42'; Coutinho 52'; Piqué (red card) 68'; Pedri 82'; Dembélé 89'	Report	Laïdouni (yellow card) 32'; Ćivić (yellow card) 44'; Kharatin 70' (pen.), (yellow card) 85'; Kovačević (yellow card) 90+1'	Stadium: Camp Nou; Attendance: 0 (Note: Due to the COVID-19 pandemic in Europe, the match was played behind closed doors.); Referee: Sandro Schärer (Switzerland)

28 October 2020 2	Juventus (Italy)	0–2	(Spain) Barcelona	Turin, Italy
21:00 CET (UTC+1)	Kulusevski (yellow card) 45+3'; Demiral (yellow card) 70' (yellow-red card) 85'; Cuadrado (yellow card) 74'; Rabiot (yellow card) 79'	Report	Dembélé 14'; Roberto (yellow card) 60'; Messi 90+1' (pen.)	Stadium: Juventus Stadium; Attendance: 0 Referee: Danny Makkelie (Netherlands)

4 November 2020 3	Barcelona (Spain)	2–1	(Ukraine) Dynamo Kyiv	Barcelona, Spain
21:00 CET (UTC+1)	Messi 5' (pen.); Piqué 65'	Report	Buyalskyi (yellow card) 70'; Tsyhankov 75'	Stadium: Camp Nou; Attendance: 0 Referee: Michael Oliver (England)

24 November 2020 4	Dynamo Kyiv (Ukraine)	0–4	(Spain) Barcelona	Kyiv, Ukraine
22:00 EET (UTC+2)	Popov (yellow card) 69'	Report	Pjanić (yellow card) 16'; Dest 52'; Braithwaite 57', 70' (pen.); Griezmann 90+2'	Stadium: NSC Olimpiyskiy Stadium; Attendance: 0 Referee: Matej Jug (Slovenia)

2 December 2020 5	Ferencváros (Hungary)	0–3	(Spain) Barcelona	Budapest, Hungary
21:00 CET (UTC+1)	Sigér (yellow card) 28'	Report	Griezmann 14', (yellow card) 53'; Braithwaite 20'; Dembélé 28' (pen.); Busquets (yellow card) 30'; Trincão (yellow card) 70'	Stadium: Puskás Aréna; Attendance: 0 Referee: Aleksei Kulbakov (Belarus)

8 December 2020 6	Barcelona (Spain)	0–3	(Italy) Juventus	Barcelona, Spain
21:00 CET (UTC+1)	Alba (yellow card) 27'; Lenglet (yellow card) 31'; Umtiti (yellow card) 60'; Firpo (yellow card) 78'	Report	Ronaldo 13' (pen.), 52' (pen.); McKennie 20'; Ramsey (yellow card) 29'; Morata (yellow card) 54'; Danilo (yellow card) 69'	Stadium: Camp Nou; Attendance: 0 Referee: Tobias Stieler (Germany)

==== Knockout phase ====
===== Round of 16 =====
The draw for the round of 16 was held on 14 December 2020.

16 February 2021 First leg	Barcelona (Spain)	1–4	(France) Paris Saint-Germain	Barcelona, Spain
21:00 CET (UTC+1)	Messi 27' (pen.)	Report	Gueye (yellow card) 20'; Mbappé 32', 65', 85'; Kean 70'	Stadium: Camp Nou; Attendance: 0 Referee: Björn Kuipers (Netherlands)

10 March 2021 Second leg	Paris Saint-Germain (France)	1–1 (5–2 agg.)	(Spain) Barcelona	Paris, France
21:00 CET (UTC+1)	Kurzawa (yellow card) 8'; Mbappé 31' (pen.); Gueye (yellow card) 50'; Paredes (yellow card) 50'; Icardi (yellow card) 89'	Report	Mingueza (yellow card) 25'; Lenglet (yellow card) 30'; Messi 37', (penalty missed) 45+3’; De Jong (yellow card) 38'	Stadium: Parc des Princes; Attendance: 0 Referee: Anthony Taylor (England)

== Statistics ==
=== Squad appearances and goals ===
No.	Pos	Nat	Player	Total		La Liga		Champions League		Copa del Rey		Supercopa	
No.	Pos	Nat	Player	Apps	Goals	Apps	Goals	Apps	Goals	Apps	Goals	Apps	Goals
Goalkeepers
1	GK	(Germany) GER	Marc-André ter Stegen	42	0	31	0	5	0	4	0	2	0
13	GK	(Brazil) BRA	Neto	12	0	7	0	3	0	2	0	0	0
Defenders
2	DF	(United States) USA	Sergiño Dest	41	3	23+7	2	7	1	2+1	0	1	0
3	DF	(Spain) ESP	Gerard Piqué	23	2	18	0	3	1	2	1	0	0
4	DF	(Uruguay) URU	Ronald Araujo	33	2	16+8	2	3	0	3+1	0	2	0
15	DF	(France) FRA	Clément Lenglet	48	1	29+4	1	7+1	0	4+1	0	2	0
18	DF	(Spain) ESP	Jordi Alba	49	5	34+1	3	6+1	0	4+1	2	2	0
20	DF	(Spain) ESP	Sergi Roberto	20	1	9+6	1	2+1	0	1+1	0	0	0
23	DF	(France) FRA	Samuel Umtiti	16	0	6+7	0	0+1	0	2	0	0	0
24	DF	(Spain) ESP	Junior Firpo	18	1	3+4	1	1+5	0	3+1	0	0+1	0
28	DF	(Spain) ESP	Óscar Mingueza	39	2	23+4	2	3+2	0	5	0	1+1	0
Midfielders
5	MF	(Spain) ESP	Sergio Busquets	50	0	32+4	0	4+2	0	5+1	0	2	0
8	MF	(Bosnia and Herzegovina) BIH	Miralem Pjanić	30	0	6+13	0	6+2	0	1	0	0+2	0
12	MF	(Spain) ESP	Riqui Puig	24	1	2+12	1	0+4	0	2+2	0	0+2	0
14	MF	(Brazil) BRA	Philippe Coutinho	14	3	8+4	2	2	1	0	0	0	0
16	MF	(Spain) ESP	Pedri	52	4	28+9	3	6+1	1	4+2	0	2	0
19	MF	(Brazil) BRA	Matheus Fernandes	1	0	0	0	0+1	0	0	0	0	0
21	MF	(Netherlands) NED	Frenkie de Jong	51	7	35+2	3	6+1	0	5	3	2	1
27	MF	(Spain) ESP	Ilaix Moriba	18	1	4+10	1	0+1	0	1+2	0	0	0
Forwards
7	FW	(France) FRA	Antoine Griezmann	51	20	32+4	13	6+1	2	5+1	3	2	2
9	FW	(Denmark) DEN	Martin Braithwaite	42	7	11+18	2	2+4	3	1+4	2	1+1	0
10	FW	(Argentina) ARG	Lionel Messi	47	38	33+2	30	6	5	5	3	1	0
11	FW	(France) FRA	Ousmane Dembélé	44	11	19+11	6	4+2	3	2+4	2	2	0
17	FW	(Portugal) POR	Francisco Trincão	42	3	3+25	3	4+3	0	3+2	0	0+2	0
22	FW	(Spain) ESP	Ansu Fati	10	5	6+1	4	2+1	1	0	0	0	0
29	FW	(United States) USA	Konrad de la Fuente	3	0	0	0	0+2	0	0+1	0	0	0
Players who made an appearance this season but left the club
6	MF	(Spain) ESP	Carles Aleñá	5	0	0+2	0	1+2	0	0	0	0	0

=== Goalscorers ===
Rank	No.	Pos.	Nat.	Player	La Liga	Copa del Rey	Champions League	Supercopa de España	Total
1	10	FW	(Argentina)	Lionel Messi	30	3	5	0	38
2	7	FW	(France)	Antoine Griezmann	13	3	2	2	20
3	11	FW	(France)	Ousmane Dembélé	6	2	3	0	11
4	9	FW	(Denmark)	Martin Braithwaite	2	2	3	0	7
4	21	MF	(Netherlands)	Frenkie de Jong	3	3	0	1	7
6	18	DF	(Spain)	Jordi Alba	3	2	0	0	5
6	22	FW	(Spain)	Ansu Fati	4	0	1	0	5
8	16	MF	(Spain)	Pedri	3	0	1	0	4
9	2	DF	(United States)	Sergiño Dest	2	0	1	0	3
9	14	MF	(Brazil)	Philippe Coutinho	2	0	1	0	3
9	17	FW	(Portugal)	Francisco Trincão	3	0	0	0	3
12	3	DF	(Spain)	Gerard Pique	0	1	1	0	2
12	4	DF	(Uruguay)	Ronald Araújo	2	0	0	0	2
12	28	DF	(Spain)	Óscar Mingueza	2	0	0	0	2
15	12	MF	(Spain)	Riqui Puig	1	0	0	0	1
15	15	DF	(France)	Clément Lenglet	1	0	0	0	1
15	20	DF	(Spain)	Sergi Roberto	1	0	0	0	1
15	24	DF	(Spain)	Junior Firpo	1	0	0	0	1
15	27	MF	(Spain)	Ilaix Moriba	1	0	0	0	1
Own goals					5	0	0	0	5
Totals					85	16	18	3	122

=== Disciplinary record ===
N	P	Nat.	Name	La Liga			Champions League			Copa del Rey			Supercopa de España			Total			Notes
N	P	Nat.	Name	Yellow card	Second yellow card	Red card	Yellow card	Second yellow card	Red card	Yellow card	Second yellow card	Red card	Yellow card	Second yellow card	Red card	Yellow card	Second yellow card	Red card	Notes
1	GK	(Germany)	Marc-André ter Stegen	1												1			
2	DF	(United States)	Sergiño Dest	1												1			
3	DF	(Spain)	Gerard Piqué	4					1							4		1	
4	DF	(Uruguay)	Ronald Araújo	3												3			
5	MF	(Spain)	Sergio Busquets	9			1									10			
6	MF	(Spain)	Carles Aleñá	1												1			
7	FW	(France)	Antoine Griezmann	4			1									5			
8	MF	(Bosnia and Herzegovina)	Miralem Pjanić	1			1			1						3			
9	FW	(Denmark)	Martin Braithwaite	3						1						4			
10	FW	(Argentina)	Lionel Messi	4						2					1	6		1	
11	FW	(France)	Ousmane Dembélé	2						1			1			4			
12	MF	(Spain)	Riqui Puig	1						1						2			
15	DF	(France)	Clément Lenglet	9	2		2						1			12	2		
16	MF	(Spain)	Pedri	2												2			
17	FW	(Portugal)	Francisco Trincão	1			1			1						3			
18	DF	(Spain)	Jordi Alba	9			1			2			1			13			
20	MF	(Spain)	Sergi Roberto	1			1									2			
21	MF	(Netherlands)	Frenkie de Jong	5			1									6			
22	FW	(Spain)	Ansu Fati	1												1			
23	DF	(France)	Samuel Umtiti	1			1									2			
24	DF	(Spain)	Junior Firpo	2			1									3			
27	MF	(Spain)	Ilaix Moriba	1												1			
28	DF	(Spain)	Óscar Mingueza	4			1			1			1			7			

Source: FCBarcelona.com
Ordered by (red card) , (second yellow card) and (yellow card)
(yellow card) = Number of bookings; (second yellow card) = Number of sending offs after a second yellow card; (red card) = Number of sending offs by a direct red card.

=== Injury record ===
N	P	Nat.	Name	Type	Status	Source	Match	Inj. Date	Ret. Date
1	GK	(Germany)	Marc-Andre ter Stegen	right knee injury		FCB.com	2019–20 season	Pre-Season	4 November 2020
23	DF	(France)	Samuel Umtiti	left knee problem		FCB.com	in training	Pre-Season	8 December 2020
19	MF	(Brazil)	Matheus Fernandes	right hamstring strains		FCB Twitter	in training	15 September 2020	26 October 2020
24	DF	(Spain)	Junior Firpo	right hamstring injury		FCB.com	in training	30 September 2020	16 October 2020
18	DF	(Spain)	Jordi Alba	right hamstring injury		FCB.com	vs Sevilla	5 October 2020	23 October 2020
14	MF	(Brazil)	Philippe Coutinho	left hamstring injury		FCB.com	vs Real Madrid	24 October 2020	20 November 2020
4	DF	(Uruguay)	Ronald Araújo	right hamstring injury		FCB.com	vs Juventus	28 October 2020	4 December 2020
22	FW	(Spain)	Ansu Fati	meniscus tear in left knee		FCB.com	vs Real Betis	7 November 2020	Unknown
5	MF	(Spain)	Sergio Busquets	left knee sprain		FCB.com	vs Switzerland with Spain	14 November 2020	28 November 2020
3	DF	(Spain)	Gerard Piqué	sprained right knee		FCB.com	vs Atlético Madrid	21 November 2020	16 February 2021
20	DF	(Spain)	Sergi Roberto	right rectus femoris		FCB.com	vs Atlético Madrid	21 November 2020	31 January 2021
11	FW	(France)	Ousmane Dembélé	elongation in the hamstrings of right thigh		FCB.com	vs Cádiz	5 December 2020	29 December 2020
10	FW	(Argentina)	Lionel Messi	minor ankle injury		FCB.com	vs Real Valladolid	22 December 2020	2 January 2021
14	MF	(Brazil)	Philippe Coutinho	lateral meniscus injury in left knee		FCB.com	vs Eibar	29 December 2020	Unknown
4	DF	(Uruguay)	Ronald Araújo	right hamstring overload		FCB.com	vs Granada in warm-up	9 January 2021	13 January 2021
2	DF	(United States)	Sergiño Dest	right thigh problem		FCB.com	vs Athletic Bilbao	17 January 2021	23 January 2021
20	DF	(Spain)	Sergi Roberto	right thigh injury		FCB.com	vs Granada	3 February 2021	9 April 2021
4	DF	(Uruguay)	Ronald Araújo	sprained left ankle		FCB.com	vs Real Betis	7 February 2021	26 February 2021
2	DF	(United States)	Sergiño Dest	right thigh problem		FCB.com	in training	9 February 2021	13 February 2021
8	MF	(Bosnia and Herzegovina)	Miralem Pjanić	left foot injury		FCB.com	in training	9 February 2021	13 February 2021
9	FW	(Denmark)	Martin Braithwaite	hamstring strain		FCB.com	in training	9 February 2021	16 February 2021
8	MF	(Bosnia and Herzegovina)	Miralem Pjanić	ankle problem		FCB.com	in training	26 February 2021	5 March 2021
16	MF	(Spain)	Pedri	left calf injury		FCB.com	vs Sevilla	27 February 2021	3 March 2021
4	DF	(Uruguay)	Ronald Araújo	sprained left ankle		FCB.com	vs Sevilla	27 February 2021	15 March 2021
3	DF	(Spain)	Gerard Piqué	sprain in right knee		FCB.com	vs Sevilla	3 March 2021	9 April 2021
13	GK	(Brazil)	Neto	right ankle sprain		FCB.com	in training	22 March 2021	24 April 2021
9	FW	(Denmark)	Martin Braithwaite	sprained right ankle		FCB.com	in training	20 April 2021	7 May 2021
11	FW	(France)	Ousmane Dembélé	pelvis problem		FCB.com	in training	22 April 2021	24 April 2021
8	MF	(Bosnia and Herzegovina)	Miralem Pjanić	right knee problem		FCB.com	in training	24 April 2021	29 April 2021
5	MF	(Spain)	Sergio Busquets	facial contusion, fissure in maxilla		FCB.com	vs Atlético Madrid	8 May 2021	10 May 2021
20	DF	(Spain)	Sergi Roberto	right thigh injury		FCB.com	vs Levante	11 May 2021	Unknown

- Player is injured
- Player has recovered from injury
Last updated: 12 May 2021
Source: FC Barcelona
