= Indovation =

Indovation (an abbreviation of 'Indian innovation') is the process by which innovations are developed in India to serve a large number of people affordably and sustainably.The innovations generally provide substantial increase in qualitative benchmarks to offset market competition on frugal marketing budget.

A Govt initiative named SwayamPrabha harbours different d2h channels dedicated solely for technological innovations in the country and provide a safe space for brand promotions,funding grants and global recognition.Most of the innovators featured on the channel are college students and young professionals. The key idea is that innovators across the country should get access to quality resources for development of new products,marketing support and safety net against global competitive giants.

Access to education and institutional support, such as government grants, are factors associated with increased rates of innovation. Research suggests that public funding can facilitate the development of prototypes and influence productivity and confidence of researchers during the development process.

India has a good track record of frugal innovations as reported in the practice of Jugaad among India's rural poor. Examples of indovations include the Tata Nano, the Tata swach water filter, Devi Prasad Shetty's affordable cardiac care hospital, the SELCO's solar lighting solutions for consumers off the electricity grid and The First Identified Inexpensive Solar Water Filter that was designed and invented by Shripad Krishnarao Vaidya, of Nagpur, Maharashtra, India on 23 April 2010. The Specialty of the water filter is Capillary Pumping Technique.

The term indovation was first mentioned in the 2008 book, Smash Innovation, by Dr. Gopichand Katragadda. It was further developed in 2009 by Navi Radjou, the Executive Director of the Centre for India & Global Business (CIGB) at the Judge Business School, University of Cambridge. After several months of field research, CIGB set up a dedicated educational web site called Indovations.net to showcase the affordable and sustainable innovations emanating from India and network Indian entrepreneurs with the rest of the world. On November 10, 2009 Navi Radjou unveiled Indovations.net at the World Economic Forum’s India Economic Summit during a panel discussion entitled ‘Creating the Next Indovations’.

Financial Times has published two articles describing the impact of indovation on the rest of the world. Similarly, Asia Society has organized a series of panel discussions throughout 2010 in San Francisco, New York City, Hong Kong, Mumbai, and Delhi, entitled ‘INDOvations: Driving Global Innovations from Emerging Markets’ to explore how India provides a great source of inspiration for both the developed and the developing nations seeking to drive affordable and sustainable business as well as social and cultural innovation.
