= Jordi Alba =

Spanish footballer (born 1989)

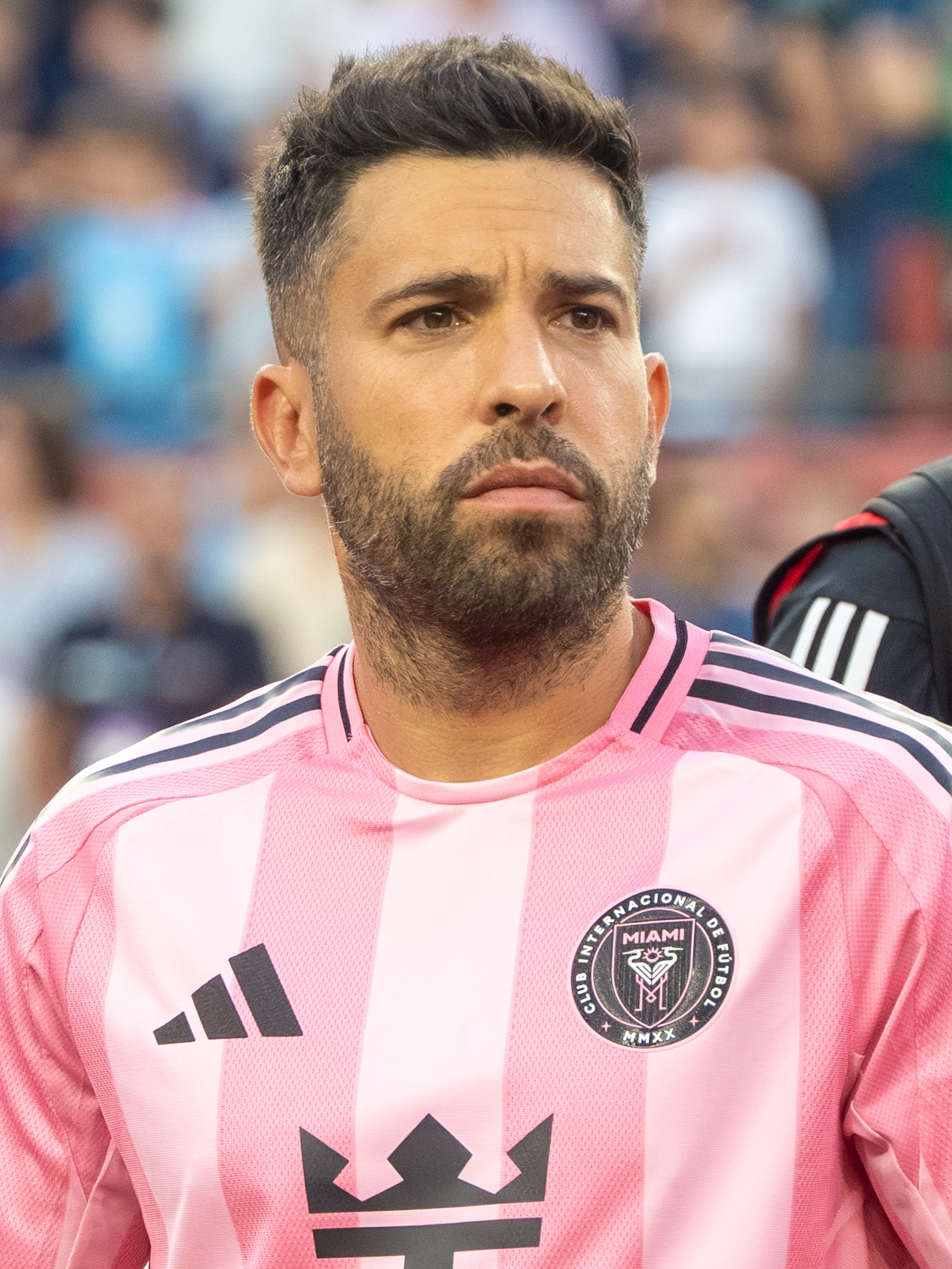
- Alba with Inter Miami in 2025

Personal information
- Full name: Jordi Alba Ramos
- Date of birth: 21 March 1989 (age 37)
- Place of birth: L'Hospitalet de Llobregat, Spain
- Height: 1.70 m (5 ft 7 in)
- Position: Left-back

Youth career
- 1996–1998: Hospitalense
- 1998–2005: Barcelona
- 2005–2007: Cornellà
- 2007–2008: Valencia

Senior career*
Years	Team	Apps	(Gls)
2006–2007	Cornellà	15	(3)
2007–2009	Valencia B	18	(5)
2008–2009	→ Gimnàstic (loan)	35	(4)
2009–2012	Valencia	74	(5)
2012–2023	Barcelona	313	(17)
2023–2025	Inter Miami	65	(11)
Total		520	(45)

International career
2008	Spain U19	6	(1)
2009	Spain U20	9	(0)
2008–2011	Spain U21	4	(0)
2012	Spain U23	4	(0)
2011–2023	Spain	93	(9)
2008–2013	Catalonia	5	(0)
Medal record
Representing Spain
UEFA European Championship
Winner	2012 Poland–Ukraine
Bronze medal – third place	2020 Europe
FIFA Confederations Cup
Runner-up	2013 Brazil
UEFA Nations League
Winner	2023 Netherlands
- * Club domestic league appearances and goals

Jordi Alba Ramos (Catalan pronunciation: [ˈʒɔɾði ˈalβə]; born 21 March 1989) is a Spanish former professional footballer who played as a left-back. He is often regarded as one of the best full-backs of his generation.

Alba started his career at Barcelona, but was released. After joining Cornellà, he moved to Valencia. In 2012, he returned to Barcelona, with whom he has won sixteen major honours, including five La Liga titles, five Copas del Rey and one UEFA Champions League. He left the club in 2023 to join Inter Miami, where he would announce his retirement upon the end of the 2025 season.

After winning 23 caps and scoring one goal at youth level, Alba made his senior debut for Spain in 2011. He was an integral member of the team that won UEFA Euro 2012, and was also part of the squads at the FIFA World Cup in 2014, 2018, and 2022, and the European Championship in 2016 and 2020. Alba was the captain of the team that won the 2022–23 UEFA Nations League. In 2023, he announced his international retirement.

== Club career ==
=== Early years ===
Alba was born in L'Hospitalet de Llobregat, Barcelona, Catalonia. He started his career in the youth ranks of Barcelona as a left winger, but was released by the club in 2005 for being too small. He then joined neighbouring club Cornellà and, after almost two years, departed in a €6,000 transfer to Valencia where he finished his football education.

After helping the reserves earn promotion from Tercera División in 2007–08, Alba played on loan at Segunda División club Gimnàstic Tarragona the following season, where he made 22 starts.

=== Valencia ===
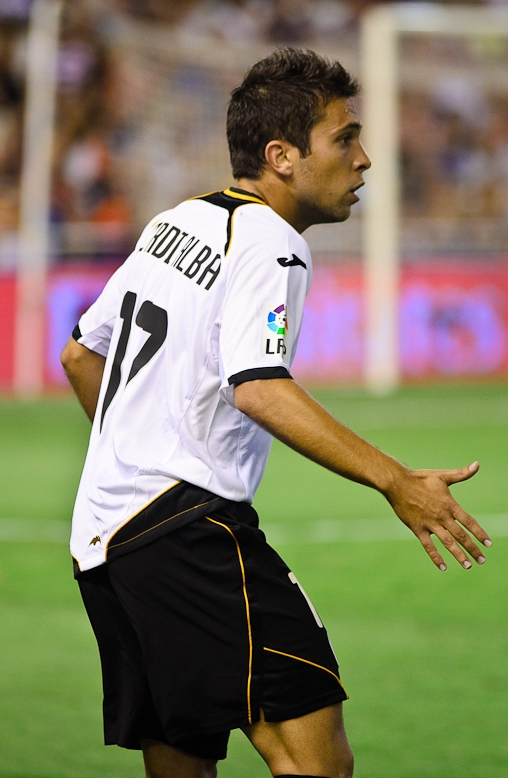
Alba playing for Valencia in 2011

After returning to Los Che, Alba made his La Liga debut on 13 September 2009, in a 4–2 win at Real Valladolid. He then started in two consecutive UEFA Europa League group stage matches, against Lille and Slavia Prague (both 1–1 draws, respectively away and home). Due to continuing injuries in Valencia's defence, he played much of 2009–10 as a left-back, posting overall good performances. In that position, on 11 April 2010, he scored his first goal for the club, in a 2–3 away loss to Mallorca.

In 2010–11, still with Unai Emery in charge, Alba was used almost always as a defender, battling for first-choice status with Jérémy Mathieu. He made 27 league appearances as the team again finished third, subsequently qualifying for the 2011–12 UEFA Champions League.

In the following campaign, Emery began using both players on Valencia's left side, a strategy he had tested the previous season. This proved an effective tactic as Alba and Mathieu frequently interchanged position and offered support for one another in both attacking and defensive areas; ultimately, Alba credited Emery as a "key man" in his successful transition to a more defensive role.

=== Barcelona ===
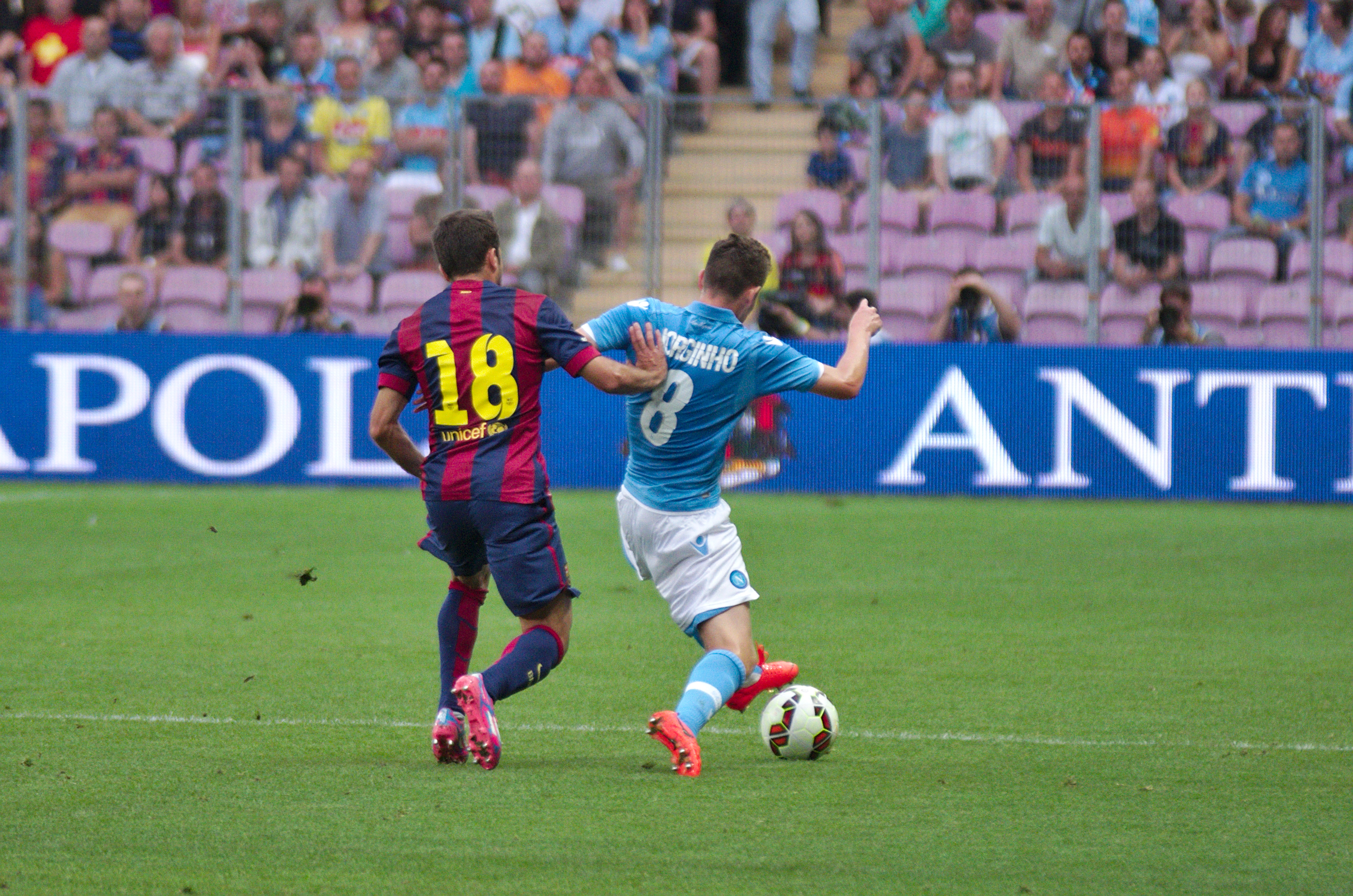
Alba taking on Jorginho of Napoli in 2014

On 28 June 2012, Alba signed a 5-year contract with Barcelona for a transfer fee of €14 million. He made his official debut on 19 August, playing the full 90 minutes in a 5–1 home win against Real Sociedad.

Alba scored his first goal for the Blaugrana on 20 October 2012, the opener in a 5–4 win at Deportivo La Coruña, and scoring an own goal. In the following game, at home against Celtic in the Champions League group stage, he found the net in the 93rd minute of a 2–1 win.

On 12 March 2013, Alba scored his fifth goal of the campaign, scoring in the last minute to complete Barcelona's 4–0 home win over A.C. Milan in the Champions League round of 16 after a 0–2 first leg defeat at the San Siro, when his team became the first in the competition's history to overturn such a deficit. He ended his first season at Barcelona as league champion, as Tito Vilanova's side regained the title from Real Madrid.

On 2 June 2015, Alba agreed to a new 5-year contract with a new buyout clause of €150 million. Four days later, he started in the Champions League final, helping the club to its fifth win in the competition by beating Juventus 3–1 at Berlin's Olympiastadion. He made 38 appearances in all competitions, with one goal, as Barça won a treble.

On 22 May 2016, Alba won the second Copa del Rey of his career, scoring in the 97th minute of the final against Sevilla after a through pass from Lionel Messi, in an eventual 2–0 extra-time win at the Vicente Calderón in Madrid.

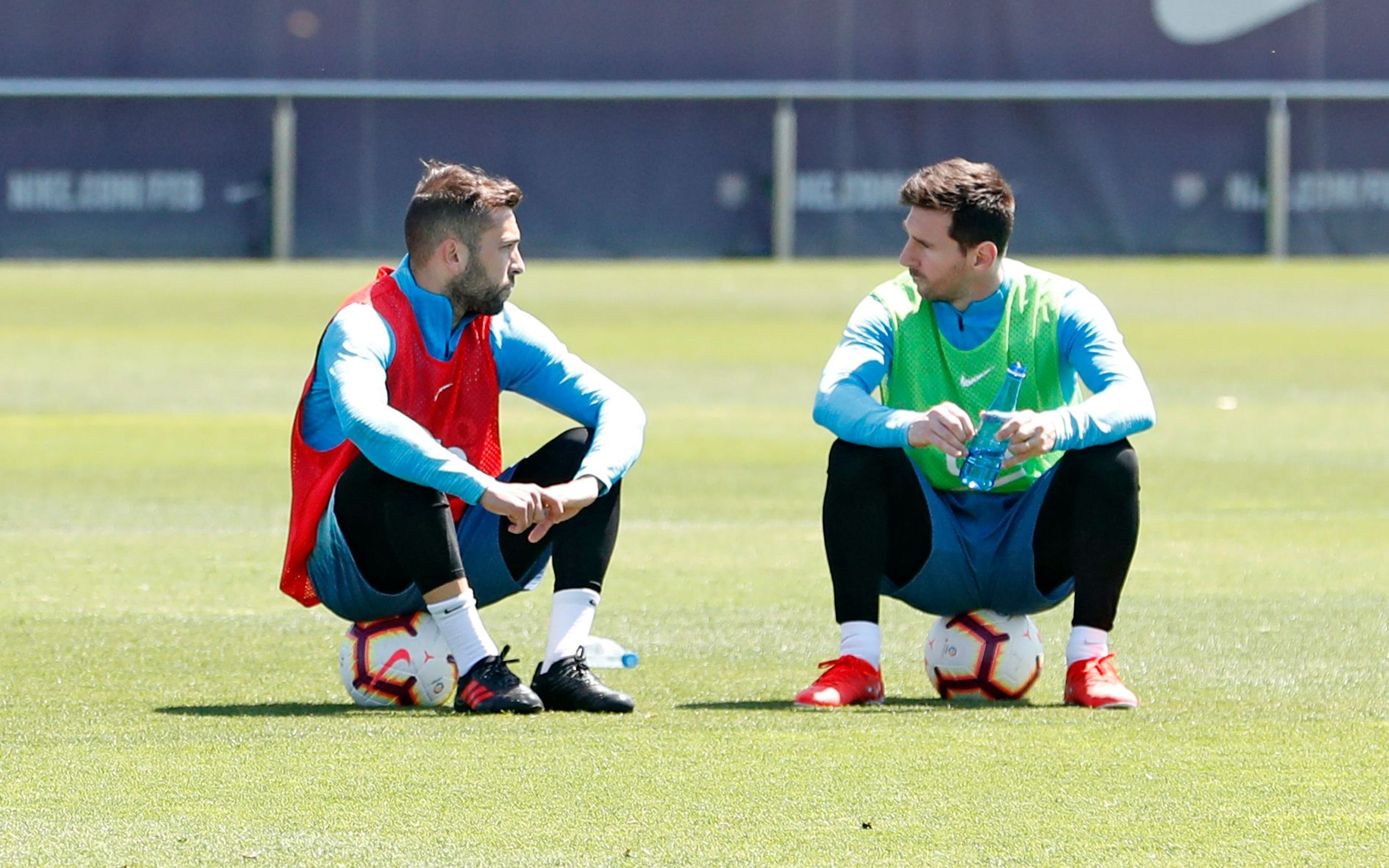
Alba with Lionel Messi in 2019

On 11 March 2019, Alba agreed to a new five-year contract with a new buyout clause of €500 million.

Alba missed out on 50% of the games in the 2019–20 season, missing 12 out of 24 games, due to a hamstring injury and a muscle injury.

Alba had his best performance in the 2020–21 season where he scored 5 goals and 13 assists in all competitions as he won the Copa del Rey with his club.

On 9 August 2021, Jordi Alba was announced as the 4th captain of Barcelona after captain Lionel Messi left the club ahead of the 2021–22 season.

On 24 May 2023, it was announced that Alba would leave Barcelona at the end of the 2022–23 season, after the player and the club reached an agreement to terminate the contract one year earlier than its expiration.

=== Inter Miami ===
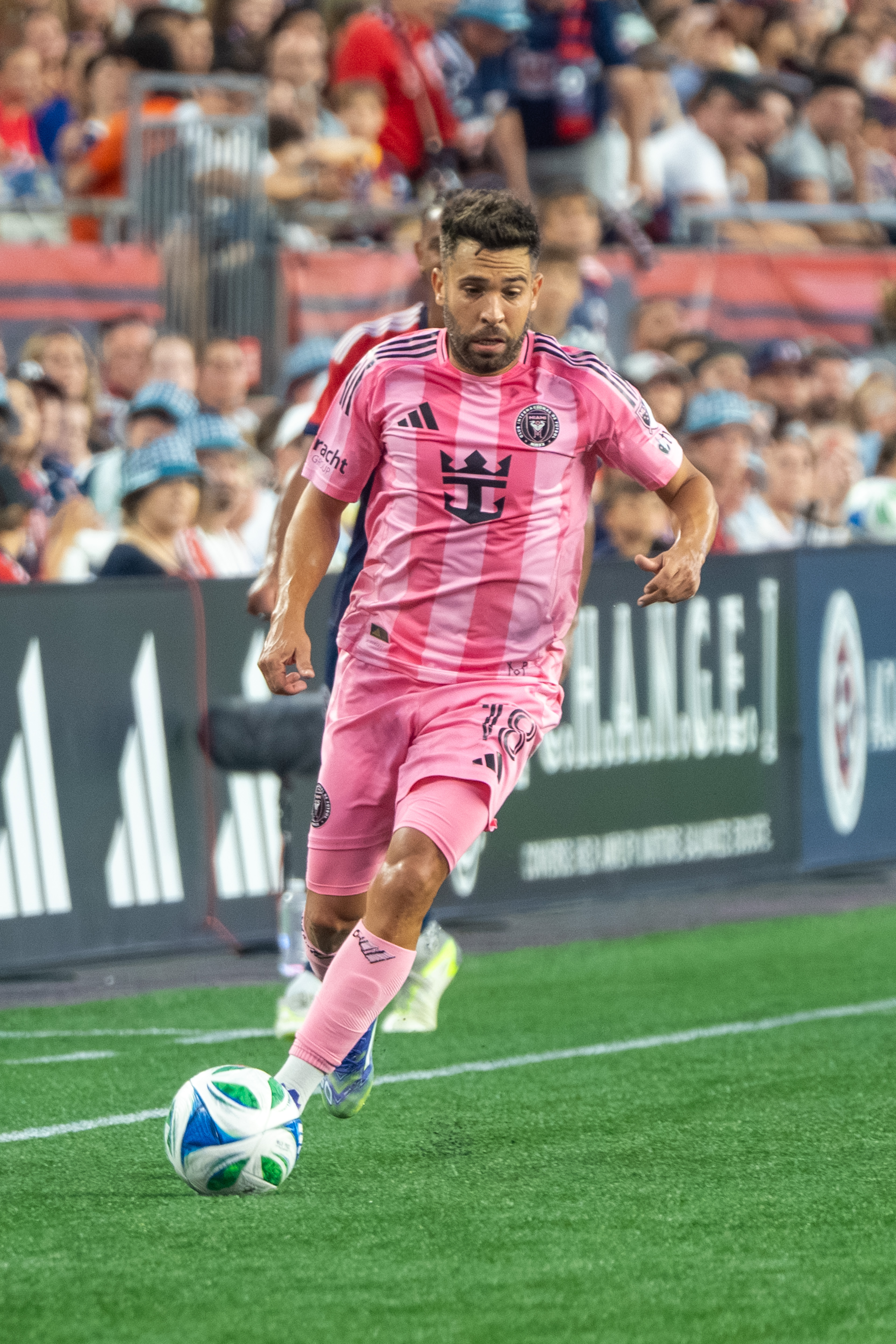
Jordi Alba with Inter Miami in 2025

On 20 July 2023, Inter Miami announced the signing of Alba on a one-and-a-half-year contract, with the option of a further year. His presentation was right before his debut for the club on 3 August against Orlando City in a Leagues Cup play-off game, coming on in the second half to help his team secure a 3–1 win. On 15 August he scored his first goal for the club in the semi-final of the Leagues Cup against Philadelphia Union in a 4–1 victory. He would go on and win his first title with the club on 20 August when Inter Miami beat Nashville SC in the 2023 Leagues Cup final after a penalty shootout. On 7 September, Alba scored his first regular season goal for the club in a 3–1 victory over Los Angeles FC.

On 9 December 2024, Inter Miami triggered Alba's contract extension, keeping him at the club until the end of the 2025 season. On 15 May 2025, he extended his contract with the club until 2027.

On 7 October 2025, Alba announced he would retire from football after the end of the 2025 MLS season. With Inter Miami making it to the 2025 MLS Cup championship game, Alba played his final professional match in a 3–1 victory over Vancouver Whitecaps FC on 6 December; fellow Inter Miami and former Barcelona teammate Sergio Busquets also played his final match.

== International career ==
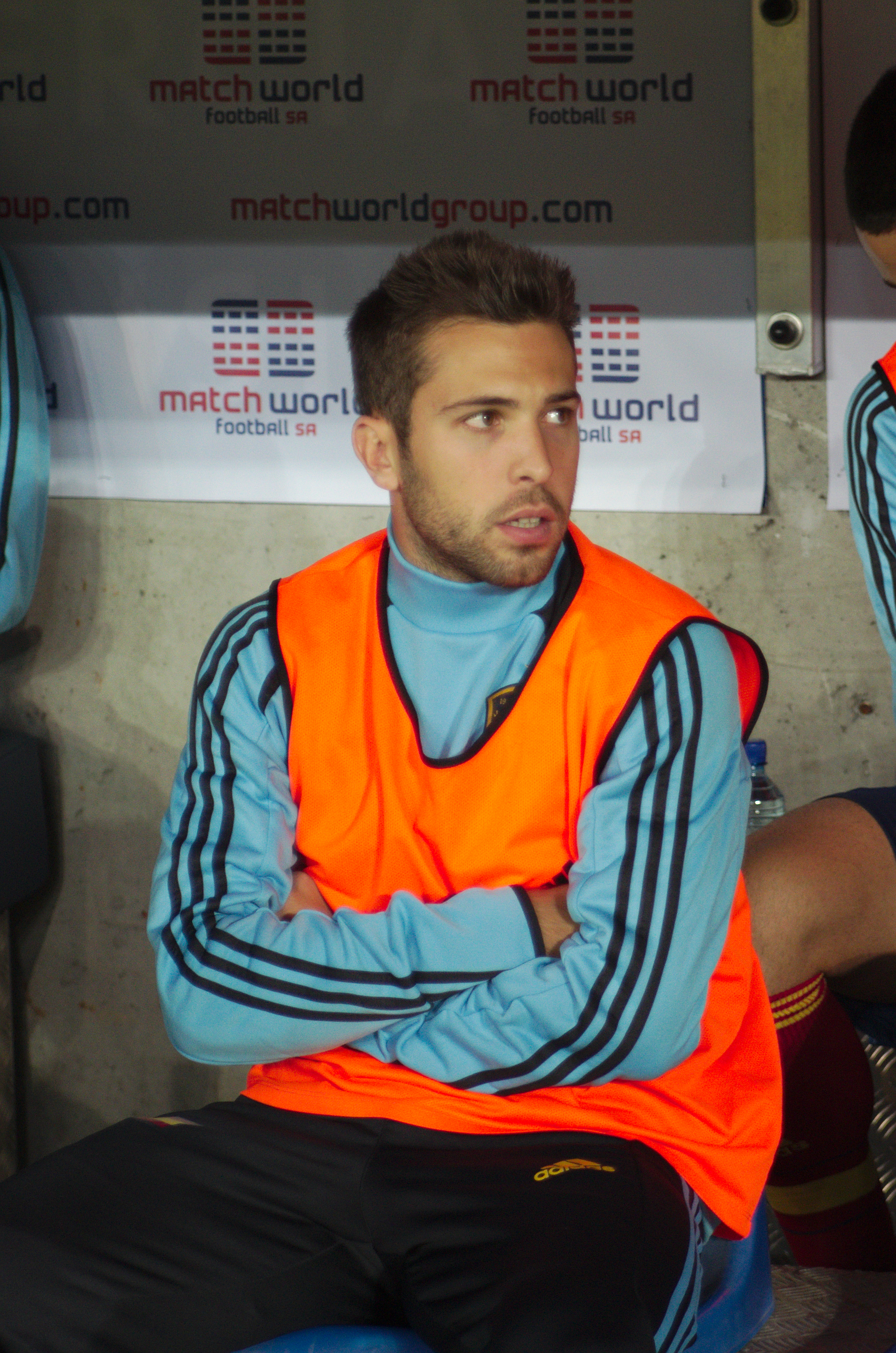
Alba with Spain in 2013

Alba represented Spain at the 2008 UEFA European Under-19 Championship, as well as appearing in all four games as the country won the gold medal at the 2009 Mediterranenan Games. He was also part of the squad at the 2009 FIFA U-20 World Cup in Egypt.

Alba received his first call-up to the full national team on 30 September 2011, for the last two UEFA Euro 2012 qualifiers against the Czech Republic and Scotland. He made his debut against Scotland on 11 October, a 3–1 win in Alicante in which his cut back from the left wing provided the assist for the opening goal, scored by former Valencia teammate David Silva. His impressive debut confirmed his status as a strong candidate to be the long-term successor of Joan Capdevila as the regular left-back for La Roja, and he was also included in the under-23 squad for the 2012 Summer Olympics in London.

Alba was included in Vicente del Bosque's squad for the Euro 2012 finals in Poland and Ukraine, and played in every match, as Spain won the tournament. He supplied the cross for Xabi Alonso to open the scoring in the 2–0 quarter-final victory over France. In the final against Italy, after running onto a pass from Xavi during a counter-attack, he scored the second goal in a 4–0 win.

Alba was also selected for the 2013 FIFA Confederations Cup in Brazil. He played four complete matches during the tournament, scoring twice in the 3–0 group stage win over Nigeria.

Alba made Del Bosque's squad for the 2014 FIFA World Cup in Brazil, making three appearances as the defending champions were knocked out in the group stage. He was also named in Julen Lopetegui's squad for the 2018 World Cup in Russia and Luis Enrique's 24-man squad for the UEFA Euro 2020.

Following the absence of captain Sergio Busquets due to coronavirus, Alba was given the captaincy until further notice. Alba was picked for the Spain squad at the 2022 World Cup in Qatar. On 18 June 2023, he captained Spain to win the Nations League Finals for the first time after defeating Croatia 5–4 on penalties following a goalless draw.

Alba's retirement from international duty was announced on 29 August 2023. He played 93 matches for Spain, scoring nine goals.

== Style of play ==
Alba was a diminutive, technically gifted, mobile, and rapid attacking left-back, who could also be used as a left winger; he was known for his pace, link-up play, ball control, positioning, vision, movement, and his ability to time his attacking runs into space and get up the flank, as well as his ability to deliver crosses into the box, which allowed him to provide assists for teammates. Moreover, he was also a tenacious tackler; however, his defending was cited as a weakness by certain pundits, such as Enrique Ortego of Marca, although he was able to improve upon this aspect of his game as his career progressed. His speed and stamina allowed him to be very involved in both his team's offensive and defensive plays, as he could get from one end of the pitch to the other very quickly, often pushing forward to get past players and score goals, or falling back when his team lost possession.

In his prime, Alba's connection and combination play with Lionel Messi rendered them one of the most effective attacking duos in world football and one of the most lethal in Barcelona's history. Regarded as a standard for left-backs in Europe by the media, Alba earned plaudits from former left-backs Joan Capdevila and Roberto Carlos over his playing style and ability. He was also considered to be among the quickest players of his generation, and one of the fastest full-backs of all time.

== Personal life ==
Alba and his partner Romarey Ventura have three children.

== Career statistics ==
=== Club ===
Appearances and goals by club, season and competition
Club	Season	League			National cup (Note: Includes Copa del Rey, U.S. Open Cup)		Continental		Other		Total	
Club	Season	Division	Apps	Goals	Apps	Goals	Apps	Goals	Apps	Goals	Apps	Goals
Cornellà	2006–07	Primera Catalana	15	3	—		—		—		15	3
Valencia B	2007–08	Tercera Federación	18	5	—		—		—		18	5
Gimnàstic (loan)	2008–09	Segunda División	35	4	1	0	—		—		36	4
Valencia	2009–10	La Liga	15	1	2	0	9 (Note: Appearances in UEFA Europa League)	0	—		26	1
Valencia	2010–11	La Liga	27	2	4	0	3 (Note: Appearances in UEFA Champions League)	0	—		34	2
Valencia	2011–12	La Liga	32	2	8	0	10 (Note: Four appearances in UEFA Champions League, six appearances and one goal in UEFA Europa League)	1	—		50	3
Valencia	Total		92	10	14	0	22	1	—		128	11
Barcelona	2012–13	La Liga	29	2	4	1	9	2	2 (Note: Appearance(s) in Supercopa de España)	0	44	5
Barcelona	2013–14	La Liga	15	0	5	0	4	0	2	0	26	0
Barcelona	2014–15	La Liga	27	1	6	1	11	0	—		44	2
Barcelona	2015–16	La Liga	31	0	3	1	9	0	2 (Note: Appearances in FIFA Club World Cup)	0	45	1
Barcelona	2016–17	La Liga	26	1	6	0	6	0	1	0	39	1
Barcelona	2017–18	La Liga	33	2	5	1	8	0	2	0	48	3
Barcelona	2018–19	La Liga	36	2	6	0	11	1	1	0	54	3
Barcelona	2019–20	La Liga	27	2	3	0	5	0	1	0	36	2
Barcelona	2020–21	La Liga	35	3	5	2	7	0	2	0	49	5
Barcelona	2021–22	La Liga	30	2	2	0	11 (Note: Five appearances in UEFA Champions League, six appearances and one goal in UEFA Europa League)	1	1	0	44	3
Barcelona	2022–23	La Liga	24	2	2	0	3 (Note: Two appearances in UEFA Champions League, one appearance in UEFA Europa League)	0	1	0	30	2
Barcelona	Total		313	17	47	6	84	4	15	0	459	27
Inter Miami	2023	MLS	7	1	1	0	—		5 (Note: Appearances in Leagues Cup)	1	13	2
Inter Miami	2024	MLS	28	4	—		3 (Note: Appearances in CONCACAF Champions Cup)	0	7 (Note: Four appearances in Leagues Cup, three appearances and one goal in MLS Cup playoffs)	1	38	5
Inter Miami	2025	MLS	30	6	—		7	1	15 (Note: Three appearances in FIFA Club World Cup, six appearances and one goal in Leagues Cup, six appearances in MLS Cup playoffs)	1	52	8
Inter Miami	Total		65	11	1	0	10	1	27	3	103	15
Career total			520	45	63	6	116	6	42	3	741	60

=== International ===
Appearances and goals by national team and year
National team	Year	Apps	Goals
Spain	2011	2	0
Spain	2012	13	2
Spain	2013	9	3
Spain	2014	9	0
Spain	2015	6	1
Spain	2016	11	0
Spain	2017	8	2
Spain	2018	9	0
Spain	2019	3	0
Spain	2020	0	0
Spain	2021	10	0
Spain	2022	11	1
Spain	2023	2	0
Total		93	9

Spain score listed first, score column indicates score after each Alba goal.

List of international goals scored by Jordi Alba
No.	Date	Venue	Cap	Opponent	Score	Result	Competition
1	1 July 2012	Olympic Stadium, Kyiv, Ukraine	11	Italy	2–0	4–0	UEFA Euro 2012
2	12 October 2012	Dynama Stadium, Minsk, Belarus	13	Belarus	1–0	4–0	2014 FIFA World Cup qualification
3	23 June 2013	Castelão, Fortaleza, Brazil	20	Nigeria	1–0	3–0	2013 FIFA Confederations Cup
4	23 June 2013	Castelão, Fortaleza, Brazil	20	Nigeria	3–0	3–0	2013 FIFA Confederations Cup
5	6 September 2013	Olympic Stadium, Helsinki, Finland	24	Finland	1–0	2–0	2014 FIFA World Cup qualification
6	5 September 2015	Estadio Carlos Tartiere, Oviedo, Spain	36	Slovakia	1–0	2–0	UEFA Euro 2016 qualification
7	11 November 2017	La Rosaleda, Málaga, Spain	57	Costa Rica	1–0	5–0	Friendly
8	14 November 2017	Krestovsky Stadium, Saint Petersburg, Russia	58	Russia	1–0	3–3	Friendly
9	24 September 2022	La Romareda, Zaragoza, Spain	86	Switzerland	1–1	1–2	2022–23 UEFA Nations League A

== Honours ==
Barcelona

- La Liga: 2012–13, 2014–15, 2015–16, 2017–18, 2018–19, 2022–23
- Copa del Rey: 2014–15, 2015–16, 2016–17, 2017–18, 2020–21; runner-up: 2013–14, 2018–19
- Supercopa de España: 2013, 2016, 2018, 2023
- UEFA Champions League: 2014–15
- FIFA Club World Cup: 2015

Inter Miami

- MLS Cup: 2025
- Eastern Conference (MLS): 2025
- Supporters' Shield: 2024
- Leagues Cup: 2023; runner-up: 2025

Spain U20

- Mediterranean Games: 2009

Spain

- UEFA European Championship: 2012
- UEFA Nations League: 2022–23
- FIFA Confederations Cup runner-up: 2013

Individual

- UEFA European Championship Team of the Tournament: 2012
- UEFA Champions League Team of the Season: 2014–15
- UEFA Champions League top assist provider: 2018–19
- La Liga Team of the Season: 2014–15
- ESM Team of the Year: 2017–18, 2018–19
- MLS Best XI: 2024
- MLS All-Star: 2024, 2025
- Inter Miami Defensive Player of the Year: 2024
