= Higher Diploma of Technical Studies (France) =

The DEST (diplôme d'études supérieures techniques), or Higher Diploma of Technical Studies was a Master's Degree school diploma issued by the French higher education establishment : Conservatoire National des Arts et Métiers (CNAM), or National Conservatory of Arts and Crafts.

- DEST is a degree is a two or three year university degree after the Licence level.

Since the LMD reform, the DEST has been replaced. The diploma was approved until 31 December 2007 and was no longer issued after 2009. Equivalent today as a Master's Degree, the diploma of DEST is recognized with other French diplomas at this level for the recruitment of a European Union executive officer in the European Parliament.

- This diploma is obtained by capitalizing Units of Values (U.V.) organized in course and / or practical work.

Each unit of education is monitored by either an annual review or a combination of annual review - continuous review. After passing the examinations (examination score > 10/20), certificates of values or half-values for the acquired units are established.

- Conditions to obtain the DEST: to be at least 23 years old, to possess a university degree, to have acquired all the expected U.V. (generally 7), to fulfill the conditions of professional experience.

The holders of this diploma are sought after for their technical skills due to a strong involvement in the professional environment.
