= 2017 Supercopa de España =

- Event: Supercopa de España
| Barcelona | Real Madrid |
| Copa del Rey | La Liga |
| 1 | 5 |
- on aggregate

First leg
| Barcelona | Real Madrid |
| 1 | 3 |
- Date: 13 August 2017
- Venue: Camp Nou, Barcelona
- Referee: Ricardo de Burgos Bengoetxea
- Attendance: 89,514

Second leg
| Real Madrid | Barcelona |
| 2 | 0 |
- Date: 16 August 2017
- Venue: Santiago Bernabéu Stadium, Madrid
- Referee: José María Sánchez Martínez
- Attendance: 75,167

The 2017 Supercopa de España was the 34th edition of the Supercopa de España, an annual two-legged football tie contested by the winners of the previous season's La Liga and Copa del Rey competitions.

The tie was played in August 2017 between the winners of the 2016–17 Copa del Rey and holders of the Supercopa, Barcelona, and the champions of the 2016–17 La Liga, Real Madrid. This was the first time since the 2012 edition that the Supercopa featured El Clásico.

Real Madrid won the Supercopa de España 5–1 on aggregate for their 10th title.

== Match details ==
=== First leg ===
The first half of the match ended goalless. Five minutes into the second half, Marcelo fired a ground cross that deflected off Piqué's foot, resulting in an own goal. Four minutes later, Real Madrid had a great opportunity to score when Benzema did a stepover and evaded Pique's tackle, then sent a cross to Dani Carvajal across the goal and Carvajal shot but Jordi Alba cleared it on the goal line. In the 70th minute, Cristiano Ronaldo scored after a pass from Casemiro but it was ruled offside. Seven minutes later, Luis Suárez was brought down in the box by Keylor Navas, resulting in a penalty, which was subsequently converted by Messi.

Messi's strike marked his 25th goal in the fixture. Three minutes later, in the 80th minute, Real scored their second through a counter attack when Isco assisted Ronaldo with a long ball who shot into the top right corner from the edge of the box. Ronaldo was booked for removing his shirt as part of the celebration. Two minutes later he was booked again by the referee for allegedly diving when he collided with Samuel Umtiti in the box, which resulted in a second yellow card to become a red card, therefore getting suspended for the second leg. Ronaldo was later given a five-match suspension after replays showed him push the referee in frustration for the red card. Real's last goal was scored in the 90th minute in similar fashion to the second, when Asensio shot into the top left corner following an assist from Lucas Vázquez.

==== Summary ====
13 August 2017
22:00 CEST

| Barcelona | 1–3 | Real Madrid |
|---|---|---|
| Messi 77' (pen.) | Report | Piqué 50' (o.g.); Ronaldo 80'; Asensio 90' |

Camp Nou, Barcelona
Attendance: 89,514
Referee: Ricardo de Burgos Bengoetxea

| Barcelona | Real Madrid |

| GK | 1 | (Germany) Marc-André ter Stegen |
| RB | 22 | (Spain) Aleix Vidal |
| CB | 3 | (Spain) Gerard Piqué | (yellow card) 27' |
| CB | 23 | (France) Samuel Umtiti |
| LB | 18 | (Spain) Jordi Alba |
| CM | 4 | (Croatia) Ivan Rakitić | | (substituted off) 83' |
| CM | 5 | (Spain) Sergio Busquets | (yellow card) 57' |
| CM | 8 | (Spain) Andrés Iniesta (c) | | (substituted off) 68' |
| RW | 10 | (Argentina) Lionel Messi | (yellow card) 40' |
| CF | 9 | (Uruguay) Luis Suárez |
| LW | 16 | (Spain) Gerard Deulofeu | | (substituted off) 59' |
Substitutes:
| GK | 13 | (Netherlands) Jasper Cillessen |
| DF | 2 | (Portugal) Nélson Semedo |
| DF | 14 | (Argentina) Javier Mascherano |
| DF | 19 | (France) Lucas Digne |
| MF | 6 | (Spain) Denis Suárez | | (substituted on) 59' |
| MF | 20 | (Spain) Sergi Roberto | | (substituted on) 68' |
| FW | 17 | (Spain) Paco Alcácer | | (substituted on) 83' |
Manager:
(Spain) Ernesto Valverde

| GK | 1 | (Costa Rica) Keylor Navas |
| RB | 2 | (Spain) Dani Carvajal | (yellow card) 41' |
| CB | 5 | (France) Raphaël Varane |
| CB | 4 | (Spain) Sergio Ramos (c) |
| LB | 12 | (Brazil) Marcelo | (yellow card) 76' |
| DM | 14 | (Brazil) Casemiro | (yellow card) 20' |
| CM | 8 | (Germany) Toni Kroos |
| CM | 23 | (Croatia) Mateo Kovačić | | (substituted off) 68' |
| AM | 22 | (Spain) Isco |
| CF | 11 | (Wales) Gareth Bale | (yellow card) 41' | (substituted off) 81' |
| CF | 9 | (France) Karim Benzema | | (substituted off) 58' |
Substitutes:
| GK | 13 | (Spain) Kiko Casilla |
| DF | 6 | (Spain) Nacho |
| DF | 15 | (France) Théo Hernandez |
| MF | 24 | (Spain) Dani Ceballos |
| FW | 7 | (Portugal) Cristiano Ronaldo | (yellow card) 80' (yellow-red card) 82' | (substituted on) 58' |
| FW | 17 | (Spain) Lucas Vázquez | | (substituted on) 81' |
| MF | 20 | (Spain) Marco Asensio | | (substituted on) 68' |
Manager:
(France) Zinedine Zidane

Assistant referees:
Núñez Fernández
De Francisco Grijalba
Fourth official:
Santos Pargaña

Match rules

- 90 minutes.
- Seven named substitutes, of which up to three may be used.

=== Second leg ===
The first goal came quite early in the second leg through a Real throw-in the fourth minute following a poor clearance from Samuel Umtiti which resulted in the ball landing in the young Marco Asensio's feet who scored from 30+ yards out with his left foot. In the 32nd minute, Benzema stole the ball from Javier Mascherano and passed it to Lucas Vazquez in the center of the box who then hit the left post.

Eight minutes after the half-hour mark, Marcelo sent a ground cross in for Benzema who controlled it backwards with his right foot and finished with a left foot half-volley straight into the bottom corner of the net which was enough for the victory. Six minutes after the start of the second half, Raphaël Varane made a poor pass to Mateo Kovačić to let Suarez recover the ball and pass it to Messi who then hit the crossbar inside the box. In the 70th minute, Andre Gomes took a throw in and played it to Suarez who then made a body feint and dribbled past Dani Carvajal. Suarez then played a through ball to Sergi Roberto on the left side of the box who toe poked the ball, which was saved by Navas. Varane's header fell to Ivan Rakitic a few yards outside the box who then passed the ball to Messi who took a shot, which was saved by Navas, and the deflection fell in the path of Suarez who performed a diving header that bounced off the right side post and went out of play.

There was lesser action for the last 20 minutes, although Théo Hernandez, Dani Ceballos and Nélson Semedo came on to make their official debuts respectively.

==== Summary ====
16 August 2017
23:00 CEST

| Real Madrid | 2–0 | Barcelona |
|---|---|---|
| Asensio 4'; Benzema 39' | Report |

Santiago Bernabéu Stadium, Madrid
Attendance: 75,167
Referee: José María Sánchez Martínez

| Real Madrid | Barcelona |

| GK | 1 | (Costa Rica) Keylor Navas |
| RB | 2 | (Spain) Dani Carvajal |
| CB | 5 | (France) Raphaël Varane |
| CB | 4 | (Spain) Sergio Ramos (c) |
| LB | 12 | (Brazil) Marcelo |
| CM | 10 | (Croatia) Luka Modrić |
| CM | 23 | (Croatia) Mateo Kovačić | (substituted off) 62' |
| CM | 8 | (Germany) Toni Kroos | (substituted off) 80' |
| RF | 17 | (Spain) Lucas Vázquez |
| CF | 9 | (France) Karim Benzema |
| LF | 20 | (Spain) Marco Asensio | (substituted off) 75' |
Substitutes:
| GK | 13 | (Spain) Kiko Casilla |
| DF | 6 | (Spain) Nacho |
| DF | 15 | (France) Théo Hernandez | (substituted on) 75' |
| MF | 14 | (Brazil) Casemiro | (substituted on) 62' |
| MF | 22 | (Spain) Isco |
| MF | 24 | (Spain) Dani Ceballos | (substituted on) 80' |
| FW | 11 | (Wales) Gareth Bale |
Manager:
(France) Zinedine Zidane

| GK | 1 | (Germany) Marc-André ter Stegen |
| CB | 14 | (Argentina) Javier Mascherano | (yellow card) 90+3' |
| CB | 3 | (Spain) Gerard Piqué | | (substituted off) 50' |
| CB | 23 | (France) Samuel Umtiti |
| RM | 20 | (Spain) Sergi Roberto |
| CM | 4 | (Croatia) Ivan Rakitić |
| CM | 5 | (Spain) Sergio Busquets |
| CM | 21 | (Portugal) André Gomes | | (substituted off) 72' |
| LM | 18 | (Spain) Jordi Alba | | (substituted off) 78' |
| CF | 10 | (Argentina) Lionel Messi (c) |
| CF | 9 | (Uruguay) Luis Suárez | (yellow card) 89' |
Substitutes:
| GK | 13 | (Netherlands) Jasper Cillessen |
| DF | 2 | (Portugal) Nélson Semedo | | (substituted on) 50' |
| DF | 19 | (France) Lucas Digne | | (substituted on) 78' |
| DF | 22 | (Spain) Aleix Vidal |
| MF | 6 | (Spain) Denis Suárez |
| FW | 16 | (Spain) Gerard Deulofeu | | (substituted on) 72' |
| FW | 17 | (Spain) Paco Alcácer |
Manager:
(Spain) Ernesto Valverde

Assistant referees:
Cabañero Martínez
Gallego García
Fourth official:
Gallego Gambín

Match rules

- 90 minutes.
- 30 minutes of extra time if level on aggregate and away goals.
- Penalty shoot-out if no goals scored in extra time.
- Seven named substitutes, of which up to three may be used.

== See also ==
- El Clásico
- 2017–18 La Liga
- 2017–18 Copa del Rey
- 2017–18 FC Barcelona season
- 2017–18 Real Madrid CF season
