= Samuel Umtiti =

French footballer (born 1993)

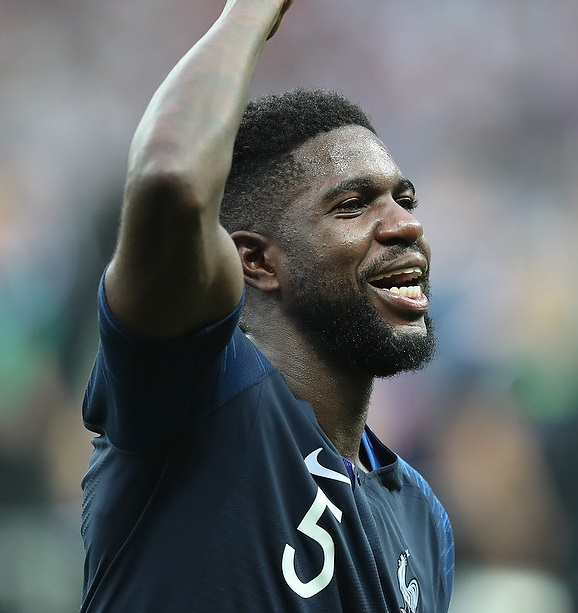
- Umtiti with France at the 2018 FIFA World Cup final

Personal information
- Full name: Samuel Yves Um Titi
- Date of birth: 14 November 1993 (age 32)
- Place of birth: Yaoundé, Cameroon
- Height: 1.83 m (6 ft 0 in)
- Position: Centre-back

Youth career
- 1998–2002: Menival
- 2002–2012: Lyon

Senior career*
Years	Team	Apps	(Gls)
2010–2012	Lyon II	21	(0)
2012–2016	Lyon	131	(3)
2016–2023	Barcelona	91	(2)
2022–2023	→ Lecce (loan)	25	(0)
2023–2025	Lille	6	(0)
Total		274	(5)

International career
2009–2010	France U17	7	(0)
2010–2011	France U18	7	(0)
2011–2012	France U19	13	(2)
2012–2013	France U20	13	(0)
2013–2014	France U21	7	(1)
2016–2019	France	31	(4)
Medal record
Men's football
Representing France
FIFA World Cup
Winner	2018
UEFA European Championship
Runner-up	2016
FIFA U-20 World Cup
Winner	2013
- * Club domestic league appearances and goals

Samuel Yves Um Titi (born 14 November 1993), known as Samuel Umtiti (French pronunciation: [samɥɛl umtiti]), is a former professional footballer who played as a centre-back. Born in Cameroon, he played for the France national team.

Umtiti began his professional career with Ligue 1 club Olympique Lyonnais in 2012, winning both the Coupe de France and Trophée des Champions in his first year. He totalled 170 games and three goals before a €25 million transfer to La Liga club Barcelona in 2016, winning three Copa del Rey and two league titles whilst a part of the side. After spending a season on loan in Italy with Lecce, he returned to France in 2023, joining Lille and ultimately retiring in 2025.

After earning 47 caps and scoring three goals at youth level, including winning the 2013 U-20 World Cup, Umtiti made his senior debut for the France national team at UEFA Euro 2016, where they reached the final. Two years later, he was part of the squad that won the 2018 FIFA World Cup. He scored the only goal of the match in the semi-final against Belgium.

== Early life ==
Samuel Umtiti was born in Yaoundé, Cameroon. When he was two years old, he and his family moved to Lyon, France, first residing in the northeastern commune of Villeurbanne before finally settling in the district of Ménival in the 5th arrondissement of Lyon a few months later. Umtiti acquired French nationality on 25 September 2008, through the collective effect of his mother's naturalization, thus making him a citizen of France.

== Club career ==
=== Lyon ===
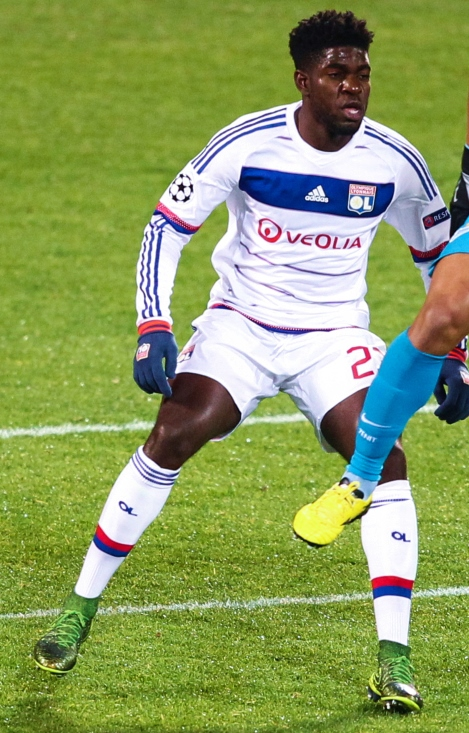
Umtiti playing for Lyon against Zenit in November 2015

Umtiti joined the local football club Ménival at the age of five. At nine years old, he joined the Olympique Lyonnais youth academy. He made his first appearance with the senior team on 16 August 2011, remaining an unused substitute as they defeated Rubin Kazan 3–1 in the first leg of the Champions League play-off round. He made his professional debut for the club on 8 January 2012, playing the whole match in a 3–1 victory over local rivals Lyon-Duchère in the Coupe de France. Six days later, he made his Ligue 1 debut in a 1–0 away defeat to Montpellier, playing the entire game. Umtiti made a total of 18 appearances across all competitions in his debut season.

In the 2012–13 season, he became a more regular member of the Lyon first team. On 12 January 2013, against Troyes in a 2–1 away win, he scored his first career goal. He finished the season with 32 appearances in all competitions and two goals.

=== Barcelona ===
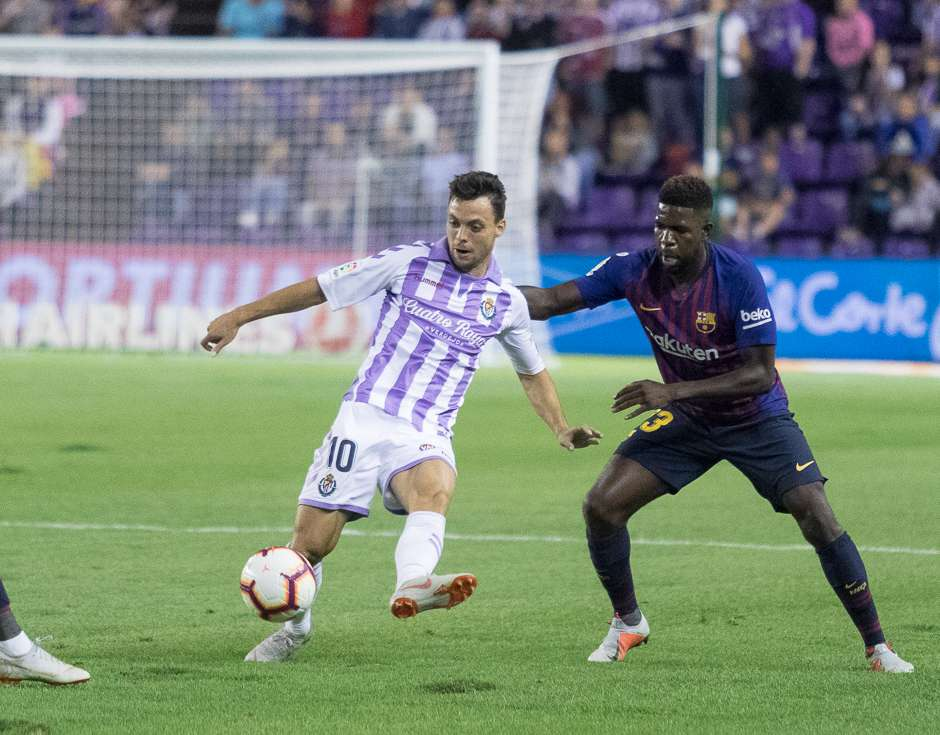
Umtiti playing for Barcelona against Real Valladolid in August 2018

On 30 June 2016, Umtiti signed for La Liga side Barcelona for a fee of €25 million. On 17 August, Umtiti made his first appearance for Barcelona in the second leg of the 2016 Supercopa de España which Barcelona won 3–0 versus Sevilla and lifted the trophy. Umtiti picked up a knee injury in September 2016 while in Barcelona training, causing him to miss a crucial La Liga clash against Atlético Madrid. He scored his first goal for the club, on 4 March 2017, against Celta de Vigo with Barcelona winning 5–0 at the Camp Nou. He would later play a vital role in the 2016–17 Champions League round of 16 second leg fixture against Paris Saint-Germain, as he started the match alongside Gerard Piqué and Javier Mascherano in a 3-man central defence partnership. Umtiti assisted his teammates in recovering from a 4–0 first leg deficit to a historic 6–1 victory, the biggest comeback in the history of the Champions League. He would cap off his first year in Spain by winning the 2016–17 Copa del Rey and by establishing himself firmly as first-choice in central defence for the club alongside Piqué.

Now established as first-choice in defence at the club, after Barcelona's subpar 2017 Supercopa de España while reeling off the loss of Neymar, Umtiti began the season with great performances, under the guidance of new manager Ernesto Valverde. On 2 December, Umtiti injured his right hamstring and was ruled out for eight weeks. Umtiti scored the winning goal against Valencia CF at Camp Nou, on 14 April, in a 2–1 victory for the Catalans. A week later, on 21 April, Umtiti started for Barcelona in the 2018 Copa del Rey Final, holding a clean sheet in an eventual 5–0 victory over Sevilla at the Metropolitano Stadium. Additionally, Umtiti won his first La Liga winners' medal during his second season in Spain, with the defender appearing in 40 games and scoring one goal across all competitions.

On 3 June 2018, Umtiti signed a new five-year contract with Barcelona. The release clause was subsequently set at €500 million. Umtiti was named as a substitute for the 2018 Supercopa de España behind Piqué and a new summer signing Clément Lenglet. Despite not featuring and with Barcelona winning the match 2–1 against Sevilla, Umtiti claimed his fifth winners' medal since joining the club.

In 2018, Umtiti picked up a knee injury which could have been treated with surgery, but he instead opted for conservative treatment, and proceeded to play in the 2018 World Cup, which he won with France. However, this choice resulted in the defender spending much of the following season with Barcelona injured.

In August 2020, while recovering from a knee injury, Umtiti tested positive for COVID-19. However, fitness difficulties plagued him year after year, and he was reduced to a supporting role for Barcelona.

==== Loan to Lecce ====
On 25 August 2022, Barcelona announced that they had reached an agreement with newly-promoted Serie A side Lecce on the loan of Umtiti until 30 June 2023, with no purchase option. He then made his debut with the club on 9 October, starting and playing the full 90 minutes in a 2–1 league loss against Roma.

On 4 January 2023, the defender was racially abused, together with his team-mate Lameck Banda, by a group of away supporters during a home league game against Lazio. The Lazio fans involved kept targeting the two players with racist chants throughout most parts of the match, with referee Livio Martinelli being forced to interrupt the game for a few minutes during the second half. The game eventually ended in a 2–1 win for Lecce. Umtiti, who burst into tears after the final whistle and was praised for his performance on the pitch, was defended by Lecce supporters, who had attempted to drown out the abuse with counter-chants of praise for the Frenchman throughout the second half; the club's president himself, Saverio Sticchi Damiani, also stood for both the abused players in the post-match. Lazio apologised for the behaviour of their supporters by issuing an official statement on social media, while FIFA president Gianni Infantino showed support to Umtiti and Banda through a message on his Instagram profile. Umtiti made 24 starts and played a key role in defence all season, as Lecce were able to secure Serie A safety on 28 May with a 1–0 win over Monza.

==== Contract termination ====
On 30 June 2023, Barcelona announced they had mutually agreed to end Umtiti's contract which was supposed to last until the 2025–26 season.

=== Lille ===
On 21 July 2023, Umtiti signed for Ligue 1 club Lille on a contract until 2025.

On 15 September 2025, Umtiti announced his retirement from professional football after suffering from chronic cartilage damage in his knee during the latter years of his career.

== International career ==
=== Youth ===
Umtiti was a France youth international, having represented the country from under-17 to under-21 levels. He was an integral member of the team that won France's first ever U-20 World Cup in 2013. Although, he had to sit out the final against Uruguay due to a red card received in the semi-final against Ghana.

=== Senior ===
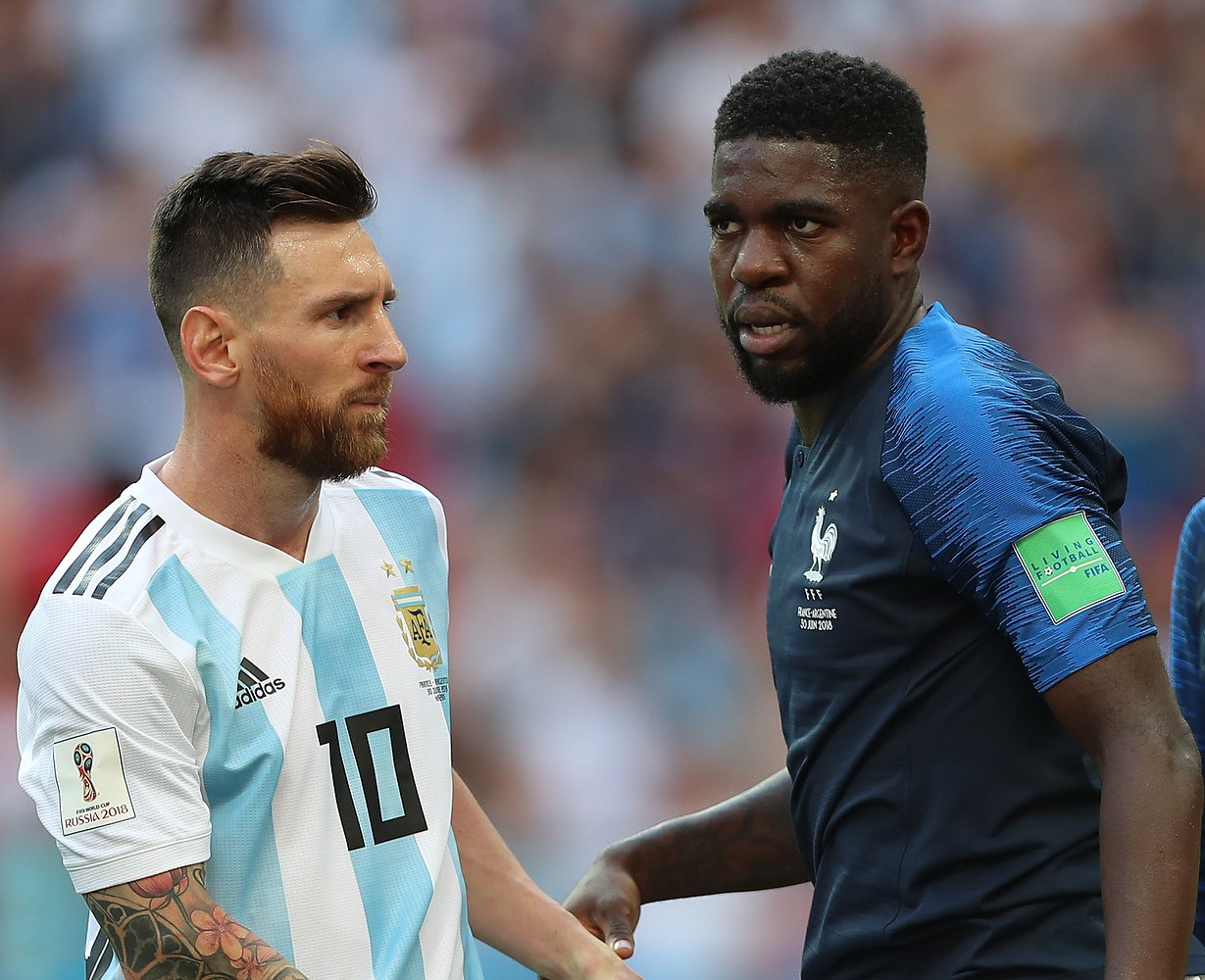
Umtiti defending against Argentina's Lionel Messi, his Barcelona teammate, at the 2018 FIFA World Cup

Umtiti was born and spent the first two years of his life in Cameroon. Therefore, the Cameroonian Football Federation and their former international player Roger Milla met his advisors in an unsuccessful attempt to get him to represent their national team.

Umtiti, who was at the time uncapped at senior level, was selected by the France national team manager Didier Deschamps to be part of the France's squad for the European Championship in 2016, following an injury to the compatriot Jérémy Mathieu. Umtiti made his senior debut on 3 July by playing every minute of the quarter-final against Iceland at the Stade de France, replacing the suspended Adil Rami. Thus, he became the first outfield player since Gabriel De Michèle (at the 1966 World Cup) to win his first cap for France by appearing in the finals of a major tournament and was accurate with all 77 of his passes during the match, which France won 5–2. He later earned extremely positive reviews for his performance in the semi-final against the incumbent world champions Germany. This led to a lot of excitement over Umtiti's prospects for his newly signed club, Barcelona, and his future as a player.

On 13 June 2017, Umtiti scored his first goal for France, equalising against England in an eventual 3–2 victory for Les Bleus in a friendly match in Paris.

On 17 May 2018, he was called up to the 23-man France squad for the 2018 World Cup in Russia. In the semi-final against Belgium on 10 July, he scored the only goal of the game, heading in a corner. On 15 July, Umtiti was named as a starter, as France beat Croatia 4–2 in the final.

== Style of play ==
Umtiti was a powerful and rangy left-footed central defender, who was predominantly known for his physical strength, anticipation, pace, ability in the air, and tackling, as well as his distribution, technique, and ability on the ball, which enabled him to carry the ball out from the defence, or start attacking plays from the back with his passing. In 2018, ESPN FC journalist Sam Marsden praised Umtiti's reading of the game, timing and risk-taking, adding that he could lead Barcelona's defence for the next five to ten years.

In the 2017–18 season, Umtiti had suffered several knee and muscle injuries when playing for Barcelona. When the World Cup came, he had been advised by many doctors to have surgery to prevent injuries getting worse and worse, however Umtiti decided to play through the pain instead. Despite winning the World Cup, Umtiti struggled with many injuries which deeply affected the rest of his career as a result, and he was known to be very injury prone from then on.

== Career statistics ==
=== Club ===
Appearances and goals by club, season and competition
Club	Season	League			National cup (Note: Includes Coupe de France, Copa del Rey)		League cup (Note: Includes Coupe de la Ligue)		Europe		Other		Total	
Club	Season	Division	Apps	Goals	Apps	Goals	Apps	Goals	Apps	Goals	Apps	Goals	Apps	Goals
Lyon II	2010–11	CFA	13	0	—		—		—		—		13	0
Lyon II	2011–12	CFA	6	0	—		—		—		—		6	0
Lyon II	2012–13	CFA	2	0	—		—		—		—		2	0
Lyon II	Total		21	0	—		—		—		—		21	0
Lyon	2011–12	Ligue 1	12	0	3	0	3	0	0	0	—		18	0
Lyon	2012–13	Ligue 1	26	1	0	0	0	0	6 (Note: Appearances in UEFA Europa League)	1	0	0	32	2
Lyon	2013–14	Ligue 1	28	0	1	0	3	0	10 (Note: Three appearances in UEFA Champions League, seven appearances in UEFA Europa League)	0	—		42	0
Lyon	2014–15	Ligue 1	35	1	2	0	1	0	2	1	—		40	2
Lyon	2015–16	Ligue 1	30	1	2	0	1	0	4 (Note: Appearance(s) in UEFA Champions League)	0	1 (Note: Appearance in Trophée des Champions)	0	38	1
Lyon	Total		131	3	8	0	8	0	22	2	1	0	170	5
Barcelona	2016–17	La Liga	25	1	9	0	—		8	0	1 (Note: Appearance(s) in Supercopa de España)	0	43	1
Barcelona	2017–18	La Liga	25	1	4	0	—		9	0	2	0	40	1
Barcelona	2018–19	La Liga	14	0	0	0	—		1	0	0	0	15	0
Barcelona	2019–20	La Liga	13	0	1	0	—		3	0	1	0	18	0
Barcelona	2020–21	La Liga	13	0	2	0	—		1	0	0	0	16	0
Barcelona	2021–22	La Liga	1	0	0	0	—		0	0	0	0	1	0
Barcelona	Total		91	2	16	0	—		22	0	4	0	133	2
Lecce (loan)	2022–23	Serie A	25	0	—		—		—		—		25	0
Lille	2023–24	Ligue 1	6	0	1	0	—		6 (Note: Appearances in UEFA Europa Conference League)	0	—		13	0
Career total			274	5	25	0	8	0	50	2	5	0	362	7

=== International ===
Appearances and goals by national team and year
National team	Year	Apps	Goals
France	2016	4	0
France	2017	10	1
France	2018	13	2
France	2019	4	1
Total		31	4

France score listed first, score column indicates score after each Umtiti goal

List of international goals scored by Samuel Umtiti
No.	Date	Venue	Cap	Opponent	Score	Result	Competition
1	13 June 2017	Stade de France, Saint-Denis, France	8	England	1–1	3–2	Friendly
2	1 June 2018	Allianz Riviera, Nice, France	18	Italy	1–0	3–1	Friendly
3	10 July 2018	Krestovsky Stadium, Saint Petersburg, Russia	24	Belgium	1–0	1–0	2018 FIFA World Cup
4	25 March 2019	Stade de France, Saint-Denis, France	29	Iceland	1–0	4–0	UEFA Euro 2020 qualifying

== Honours ==
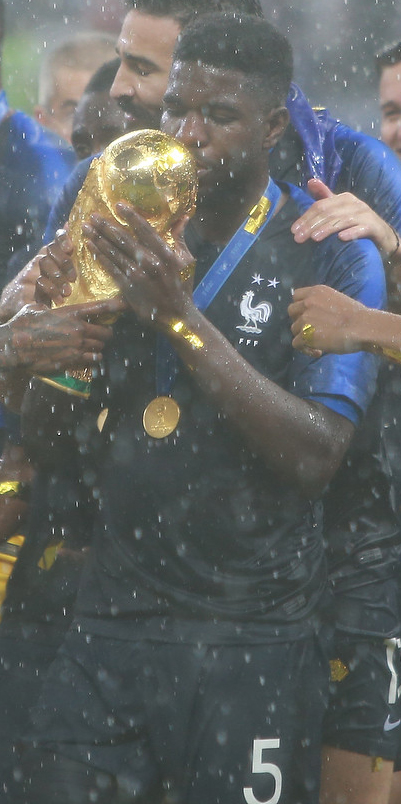
Umtiti holding the FIFA World Cup Trophy

Lyon

- Coupe de France: 2011–12
- Trophée des Champions: 2012

Barcelona

- La Liga: 2017–18, 2018–19
- Copa del Rey: 2016–17, 2017–18, 2020–21
- Supercopa de España: 2016, 2018

France U20

- FIFA U-20 World Cup: 2013

France

- FIFA World Cup: 2018

Individual

- UEFA European Under-19 Championship Team of the Tournament: 2012
- UEFA Champions League Breakthrough XI: 2016

Orders

- Knight of the Legion of Honour: 2018
