= Nélson Semedo =

Portuguese footballer (born 1993)

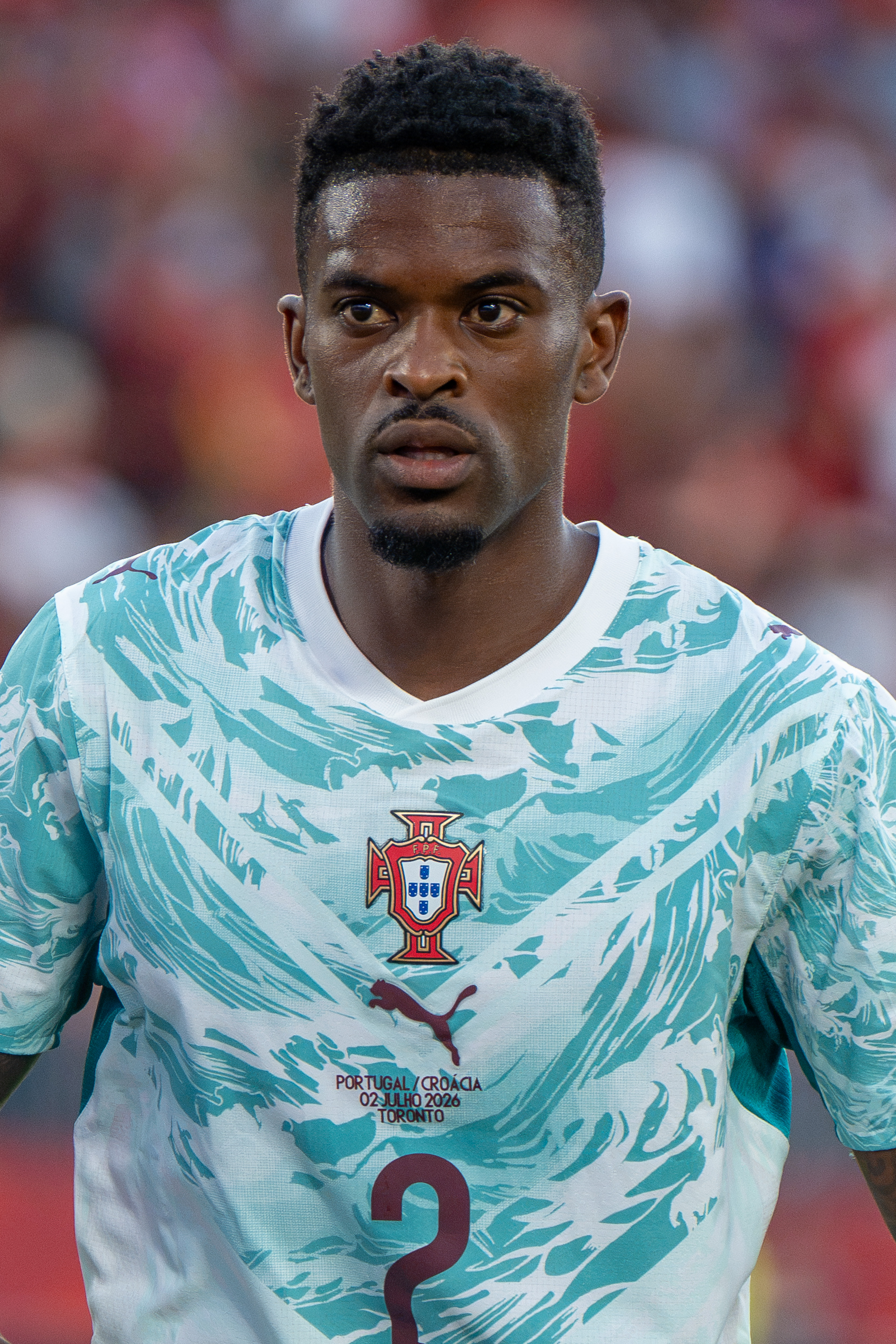
- Semedo with Portugal in 2026

Personal information
- Full name: Nélson Cabral Semedo
- Date of birth: 16 November 1993 (age 33)
- Place of birth: Lisbon, Portugal
- Height: 1.77 m (5 ft 10 in)
- Positions: Right-back; right wing-back

Team information
- Current team: Fenerbahçe
- Number: 27

Youth career
- 2008–2011: Sintrense

Senior career*
Years	Team	Apps	(Gls)
2011–2012	Sintrense	26	(5)
2012–2016	Benfica B	63	(4)
2012–2013	→ Fátima (loan)	29	(0)
2015–2017	Benfica	43	(2)
2017–2020	Barcelona	82	(2)
2020–2025	Wolverhampton Wanderers	165	(1)
2025–	Fenerbahçe	37	(1)

International career^{‡}
2016	Portugal U23	1	(0)
2015–	Portugal	54	(0)
Medal record
Men's football
Representing Portugal
UEFA Nations League
Winner	2019 Portugal
Winner	2025 Germany
FIFA Confederations Cup
Third place	2017 Russia
- * Club domestic league appearances and goals as of 8 November 2026 ‡ National team caps and goals as of 21:21, 6 July 2026 (UTC)

Nélson Cabral Semedo (born 16 November 1993) is a Portuguese professional footballer who plays as a right-back or right wing-back for Süper Lig club Fenerbahçe and the Portugal national team.

Semedo began his career at Sintrense before joining Benfica in 2012. After spending a season on loan at Fátima, he initially appeared for Benfica B before making his first-team debut in 2015 and going on to win back-to-back Primeira Liga titles, among other honours. In July 2017, he signed with Barcelona, winning La Liga in his first two seasons of a three-year stay. In September 2020, Semedo moved to Wolverhampton Wanderers.

Semedo made his senior debut for Portugal in October 2015, and represented the nation at the UEFA European Championship in 2020 and 2024 and the FIFA World Cup in 2026. He was also a part of the squads that won the FIFA Confederations Cup in 2017 and the UEFA Nations League in 2019 and 2025.

== Club career ==
=== Benfica ===
Born in Lisbon, Semedo came through the youth system at Sintrense, making his debut for the first team at age 17. On 12 January 2012, he and Manuel Liz signed five-year contracts with Benfica which were made effective on 1 July 2012. Both then spent one season on loan at Fátima in the third division.

Semedo returned to Benfica in the 2013 off-season, being assigned to the B-side in the Segunda Liga and making his professional debut on 10 August in a 0–0 away draw against Trofense. After nearly 60 appearances for the reserves, he was touted as a future replacement for long-time first-team incumbent Maxi Pereira.

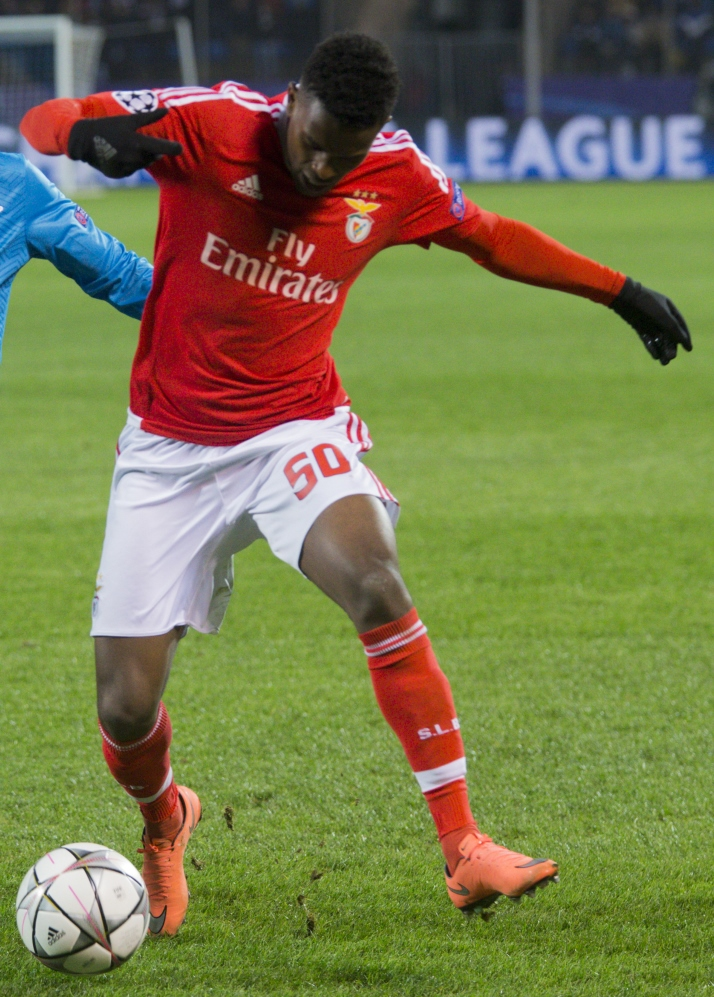
Semedo playing for Benfica in the UEFA Champions League

After Pereira's departure, Semedo extended his contract until 2021 and joined the first team on their pre-season tour in North America in July 2015. On 9 August 2015, he made his debut for the main squad in the 0–1 loss against Sporting CP for the Supertaça Cândido de Oliveira. A week later, he scored his first goal for them, against Estoril in the Primeira Liga in a 4–0 home win.

After establishing himself in the starting 11, Semedo suffered a setback in October 2015 when he sustained an injury while with the Portugal national team. The ailment to his right knee required surgery, with him being expected to miss two months. He returned to action in early January, but could not reproduce his previous form and lost his place to André Almeida. Semedo finished the campaign in the reserve team.

In 2016–17, Semedo regained his starting position and went on to be Benfica's third-most used player in the club's historic fourth-straight league title. He scored once in the league in a 2–1 win on the road over Arouca and once in the UEFA Champions League in a 3–3 group stage draw to Beşiktaş.

In the final of the Taça de Portugal, played on 28 May 2017, Semedo assisted Eduardo Salvio for the second goal, with Benfica lifting the trophy after defeating Vitória de Guimarães 2–1. For his performances throughout the season, he won the Breakthrough Player of the Year award from the Liga Portuguesa de Futebol Profissional.

=== Barcelona ===
On 13 July 2017, Barcelona announced an agreement with Benfica for Semedo's signing, pending medical tests. He signed a five-year contract the following day, with the Portuguese club receiving €30.5 million plus another potential €5 million for every 50 matches he appeared in for his new team. He made his debut on 16 August in second leg of the Supercopa de España against Real Madrid, losing 0–2 at the Santiago Bernabéu Stadium.

Semedo made his Champions League debut for the club on 13 September 2017 and was praised for his performance during the 3–0 group stage win over Juventus. He scored his first competitive goal for the Catalans – and in La Liga – on 27 January 2019 in a 2–0 away victory against Girona. His second goal came against Alavés in a 5–0 win in the season's final match.

=== Wolverhampton Wanderers ===
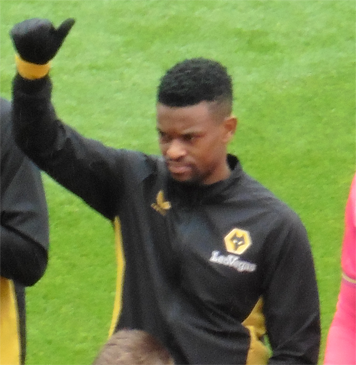
Semedo lines up for Wolverhampton Wanderers (March 2024)

On 23 September 2020, Semedo moved to English Premier League club Wolverhampton Wanderers in a three-year contract (with an option of two further years) for an initial transfer fee of €30 million (approx. £27.5 million, with a potential further £9.2 million in add-ons) paid by Wolves.

Semedo made his debut for Wolves and his first appearance in the Premier League in a 4–0 defeat away to West Ham United on 27 September 2020. He made his debut Molineux appearance for Wolves in the team's next Premier League match, a 1–0 victory over Fulham on 4 October 2020. He scored his first Wolves goal in head coach Nuno Espírito Santo's final game in charge, the final game of the 2020–21 Premier League season, a 1–2 home defeat to Manchester United on 23 May 2021.

Semedo suffered a hamstring injury in Wolves's game away to Arsenal in the Premier League on 24 February 2022; it was subsequently evaluated that the injury would keep him from returning to action for between four and eight weeks. He had played in 23 of Wolves's 25 Premier League games in the 2021–22 season at the point he sustained this injury. Semedo ultimately returned to first-team action on 24 April 2022 in a Premier League game at Burnley, playing the full 90 minutes plus stoppage time.

On 19 May 2023, it was announced that Wolves had triggered a two-year extension clause in Semedo's contract, to keep him at the club until 2025.

On 16 January 2024, Semedo scored his first goal for Wolves in two years, in a 3–2 F.A. Cup Third Round replay victory over Brentford at Molineux. His previous club goal had also come in the F.A. Cup, against Sheffield United, also at Molineux, in January 2022. The goal against Brentford meant Semedo had scored more goals for Wolves in the Third Round of the F.A. Cup (two) than he had in 114 appearances in the Premier League up to 16 January 2024 (one).

On 13 December 2024, Semedo was named club captain, taking over from Mario Lemina. Following the conclusion of the season, Semedo's contract expired and he was offered a new deal by the club. However, he opted not to accept it and on 30 July 2025, Semedo announced that he would depart the club after 5 years.

=== Fenerbahçe ===
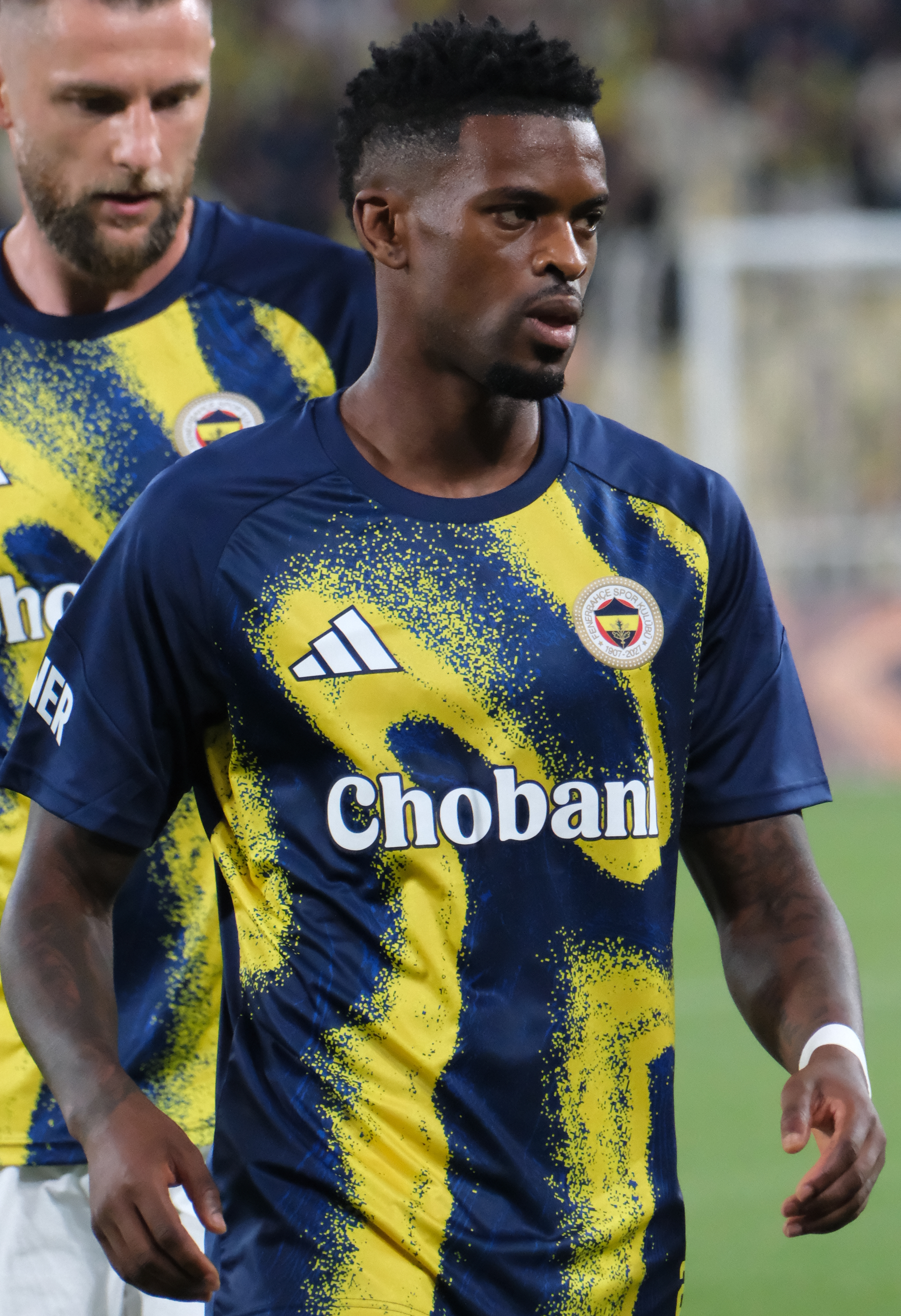
Semedo with Fenerbahçe in 2026

On 31 July 2025, Semedo signed a two-year contract with Süper Lig club Fenerbahçe.

On 6 August 2025, he made his debut with Fenerbahçe in a 2025–26 UEFA Champions League third qualifying round first leg against Feyenoord as a substitute in 2-1 away loss. On 16 August 2025, he made his Süper Lig debut against Göztepe in a 0-0 away draw. On 17 September 2025, he scored his first goal in the team and the league against Alanyaspor in a 2-2 home draw postponement match. 24 September 2025, he made his UEFA Europa League debut against Dinamo Zagreb.

== International career ==
Semedo playing for Portugal at the 2026 FIFA World Cup

Of Cape Verdean descent, Semedo was called-up to play for the Portugal national team on 2 October 2015 for UEFA Euro 2016 qualifying matches against Denmark and Serbia. He earned his first cap in the latter match, playing the entirety of a 2–1 win at the Partizan Stadium in Belgrade.

Semedo was selected for Portugal's 2017 FIFA Confederations Cup squad. He played the last match of the group stage, a 4–0 win against New Zealand. He also appeared in the third-place playoff against Mexico, being sent-off in the 106th minute as his team won the bronze medal.

Semedo was named in Portugal's preliminary 35-man squad for the 2018 FIFA World Cup. However, he was not selected for Portugal's final 23-man squad for tournament.

In October 2022, he was named in Portugal's preliminary 55-man squad for the 2022 FIFA World Cup in Qatar.

On 19 May 2026, Semedo was selected in the 26-man squad for the 2026 FIFA World Cup.

== Style of play ==
Semedo is mainly known for his speed, ball control, dribbling and holding on the ball.

== Career statistics ==
=== Club ===
As of match played 8 November 2026

Appearances and goals by club, season and competition
Club	Season	League			National cup (Note: Includes Taça de Portugal, Copa del Rey, FA Cup, Turkish Cup)		League cup (Note: Includes Taça da Liga, EFL Cup)		Europe		Other		Total	
Club	Season	Division	Apps	Goals	Apps	Goals	Apps	Goals	Apps	Goals	Apps	Goals	Apps	Goals
Sintrense	2011–12	Terceira Divisão	26	5	1	0	—		—		—		27	5
Fátima (loan)	2012–13	Segunda Divisão	29	0	2	0	—		—		—		31	0
Benfica B	2013–14	Segunda Liga	17	0	—		—		—		—		17	0
Benfica B	2014–15	Segunda Liga	42	1	—		—		—		—		42	1
Benfica B	2015–16	Segunda Liga	4	3	—		—		—		—		4	3
Benfica B	Total		63	4	—		—		—		—		63	4
Benfica	2015–16	Primeira Liga	12	1	0	0	2	0	3 (Note: Appearances in UEFA Champions League)	0	1 (Note: Appearance in Supertaça Cândido de Oliveira)	0	18	1
Benfica	2016–17	Primeira Liga	31	1	4	0	2	0	8	1	1	0	46	2
Benfica	Total		43	2	4	0	4	0	11	1	2	0	64	3
Barcelona	2017–18	La Liga	24	0	4	0	—		7	0	1 (Note: Appearance in Supercopa de España)	0	36	0
Barcelona	2018–19	La Liga	26	1	9	0	—		10	0	1	0	46	1
Barcelona	2019–20	La Liga	32	1	3	0	—		7	0	0	0	42	1
Barcelona	Total		82	2	16	0	—		24	0	2	0	124	2
Wolverhampton Wanderers	2020–21	Premier League	34	1	1	0	—		—		—		35	1
Wolverhampton Wanderers	2021–22	Premier League	25	0	2	1	1	0	—		—		28	1
Wolverhampton Wanderers	2022–23	Premier League	36	0	2	0	3	0	—		—		41	0
Wolverhampton Wanderers	2023–24	Premier League	36	0	5	1	0	0	—		—		41	1
Wolverhampton Wanderers	2024–25	Premier League	34	0	2	0	1	0	—		—		37	0
Wolverhampton Wanderers	Total		165	1	12	2	5	0	—		—		182	3
Fenerbahçe	2025–26	Süper Lig	26	1	1	0	—		13 (Note: Four appearances in UEFA Champions League, nine appearances in UEFA Europa League)	0	0	0	40	1
Fenerbahçe	2026–27	Süper Lig	11	0	0	0	—		9	0	0	0	20	0
Fenerbahçe	Total		37	1	1	0	—		22	0	0	0	60	1
Career total			444	16	36	2	9	0	57	1	4	0	550	18

=== International ===
As of match played 6 July 2026

Appearances and goals by national team and year
National team	Year	Apps	Goals
Portugal	2015	1	0
Portugal	2016	0	0
Portugal	2017	7	0
Portugal	2018	0	0
Portugal	2019	5	0
Portugal	2020	4	0
Portugal	2021	7	0
Portugal	2022	0	0
Portugal	2023	3	0
Portugal	2024	13	0
Portugal	2025	8	0
Portugal	2026	6	0
Total		54	0

== Honours ==
Benfica

- Primeira Liga: 2015–16, 2016–17
- Taça de Portugal: 2016–17
- Taça da Liga: 2015–16
- Supertaça Cândido de Oliveira: 2016

Barcelona

- La Liga: 2017–18, 2018–19
- Copa del Rey: 2017–18
- Supercopa de España: 2018

Fenerbahçe

- Turkish Super Cup: 2025

Portugal

- UEFA Nations League: 2018–19, 2024–25
- FIFA Confederations Cup: Third place 2017

Individual

- SJPF Primeira Liga Team of the Year: 2016, 2017
- LPFP Primeira Liga Breakthrough Player of the Year: 2016–17
- UEFA Champions League Breakthrough XI: 2017
- UEFA Nations League Finals Team of the Tournament: 2019

== Personal life ==
Semedo has two children, a daughter and a son.
