= 2017–18 FC Barcelona season =

119th season in existence of FC Barcelona

Barcelona
2017–18 season
- President: Josep Maria Bartomeu
- Head Coach: Ernesto Valverde
- Stadium: Camp Nou
- La Liga: 1st
- Copa del Rey: Winners
- Supercopa de España: Runners-up
- UEFA Champions League: Quarter-finals
- Top goalscorer: League: Lionel Messi (34); All: Lionel Messi (45)
- Highest home attendance: 97,939 vs Real Madrid (6 May 2018)
- Lowest home attendance: 0 vs Las Palmas (1 October 2017) (Note: The match was played behind closed doors due to violence in Catalonia relating to an ongoing independence referendum.); 48,336 vs Sporting CP (5 December 2017)
- Average home league attendance: 70,872
Home colours	Away colours	Third colours

The 2017–18 season was Futbol Club Barcelona's 119th in existence and the club's 87th consecutive season in the top flight of Spanish football. This was also the first year under head coach Ernesto Valverde.

The team produced a solid season, clinching the domestic double, going undefeated in the league up until match day 37, where Barça lost to Levante 4–5, and producing an emphatic 5–0 victory over Sevilla in the Copa final. However, in the Champions League, Barcelona crashed out in the quarter-finals for the third year in a row, losing to Roma 0–3 and being eliminated on away goals as a result (after a 4–1 home victory). The season was the first since 2013–14 season without Neymar, who departed to join Paris Saint-Germain.

== Season overview ==
=== May ===
On 29 May, the club announced Ernesto Valverde would be the new Barcelona coach following the departure of Luis Enrique at the end of the previous season.

On 29 May, Barcelona and goalkeeper Marc-André ter Stegen negotiated a five-year contract extension lasting until 30 June 2022.

=== June ===
On 14 June, Fluminense centre-back Marlon Santos signed a three-year contract.

On 30 June, goalkeeper Jordi Masip's contract expired; he was not resigned and was therefore released.

On 30 June, the club activated a buyback clause for Everton's Gerard Deulofeu.

On 30 June, the club announced they have reached an agreement with Real Betis for the transfer of Cristian Tello for €4 million.

=== July ===
On 7 July, Barcelona and Jérémy Mathieu agreed to mutually terminate the defender's contract. Mathieu subsequently joined Portuguese club Sporting CP on a free transfer.

On 13 July, Barcelona and Benfica reached an agreement for the transfer of right-back Nélson Semedo for €30 million.

On 21 July, Barcelona defeated Juventus 2–1 in a pre-season friendly. Neymar notched two impeccable first-half goals as the Catalans rolled past the Italian champions before 82,104 fans at a sold-out MetLife Stadium in the 2017 International Champions Cup. Giorgio Chiellini pulled one back for Juventus in the 63rd minute, not enough to keep the Ernesto Valverde era from beginning with a convincing win.

On 26 July, Barcelona won 1–0 against Manchester United in a pre-season friendly. Neymar scored in the 31st minute.

On 29 July, Barcelona defeated Real Madrid 3–2 in their final match of the U.S. tour, winning the United States edition of the 2017 International Champions Cup. Messi, Ivan Rakitić and Gerard Piqué each scored one goal.

=== August ===
On 3 August, Barcelona confirmed the unilateral termination of Neymar's contract as Neymar's legal representatives paid his €222 million buyout clause. In turn, Barcelona announced a turnover of operation details to UEFA so as to allow UEFA to determine any disciplinary responsibilities that may arise. Neymar subsequently joined Paris Saint-Germain on a five-year contract.

On 4 August, Barcelona drew 1–1 with Gimnàstic in a pre-season friendly game in Tarragona. Manu Barreiro put the hosts ahead in the 11th minute only for Paco Alcácer to score the equalizer for the Blaugrana from a free-kick in the 79th minute.

On 7 August, Barcelona defeated Chapecoense 5–0 in the 52nd edition of the Joan Gamper Trophy. Gerard Deulofeu, Sergio Busquets, Messi, Luis Suárez and Denis Suárez were the scorers for Barça; Messi and Deulofeu also assisted two goals each. Busquets was named the Man of the Match.

On 13 August, Barcelona lost 1–3 to Real Madrid in the first leg of the 2017 Supercopa de España. The first half of the match ended goalless. Five minutes into the second half, Marcelo fired a cross that deflected off Piqué's foot, resulting in an own goal. In the 77th minute, Luis Suárez was brought down in the box by goalkeeper Keylor Navas, resulting in a penalty which was converted by Lionel Messi. Messi's hit marked his 25th goal in the fixture. In the 80th minute, Real Madrid scored their second through a counterattack when Isco assisted Cristiano Ronaldo, who shot into the top right corner from the edge of the box. Ronaldo was booked for removing his shirt as part of his celebrations. Two minutes later, he was booked again for a dive in the penalty box, which resulted in a red card and a subsequent suspension for the second leg. Real's last goal was scored in the 90th minute in similar fashion to the second, when Marco Asensio shot into the top left corner following an assist from Lucas Vázquez.

On 14 August, Barcelona announced they had reached an agreement with Guangzhou Evergrande Taobao for the transfer of Paulinho for €40 million. His release clause was set at €120 million.

On 16 August, Barcelona lost 2–0 (agg. 1–5) to Real Madrid in the second leg of the 2017 Supercopa de España. The first goal of the match came quite early through a Real throw-in the fourth minute which resulted into getting the ball to Marco Asensio, who scored from long range. Nine minutes after the half-hour mark, Marcelo crossed in for Karim Benzema to control, who finished it with a half-volley into the net which was enough for the win for Real.

On 20 August, Barcelona defeated Real Betis 2–0 in their first Liga match of the season, following an own goal from Alin Toșca and a second within three minutes by Sergi Roberto.

On 24 August, Barcelona confirmed the transfer of Sergi Samper to Las Palmas on a season-long loan.

On 25 August, Barcelona announced they had reached an agreement with Borussia Dortmund for the transfer of Ousmane Dembélé for €105 million plus add-ons. The player signed a five-year contract and his buyout clause was set at €400 million.

On 26 August, Barcelona defeated Alavés 0–2 at Mendizorrotza. Messi scored both goals, although having a penalty saved by Pacheco. Paulinho made his debut for Barcelona.

On 29 August, Nice and Barcelona reached an agreement for the loan of Marlon for two years, with a buy-back option for Barcelona after the first year.

On 31 August, Barcelona and Benfica reached an agreement for the loan of Douglas until the end of the 2017–18 campaign.

=== September ===
On 1 September, Barcelona and Alavés reached an agreement for the loan of Munir until the end of the 2017–18 campaign.

On 5 September, midfielder Carles Aleñá signed a new contract, keeping him at the club for a further three years with an optional extra two years.

On 9 September, Barcelona defeated Espanyol 5–0 in the Derbi barceloní. Messi scored a hat-trick while Piqué and Suárez topped off the scoring. Ousmane Dembélé made his debut, coming on as a substitute for Gerard Deulofeu in the 68th minute; he set Suárez up for the final goal.

On 12 September, Barcelona beat Juventus 3–0 in their first game of the 2017–18 UEFA Champions League, following a brace by Messi and another goal by Rakitić.

On 16 September, Barcelona defeated Getafe 1–2 in a hard-fought game at the Coliseum Alfonso Pérez. Shibasaki scored a stunning goal for Getafe in the first half while both of Barcelona's goals came in the second half from substitutes Denis Suárez and Paulinho, the latter of whom scored his maiden Barcelona goal.

On 19 September, Barcelona defeated Eibar 6–1, with Messi scoring four and Paulinho and Denis Suárez getting the other goals. Eibar's only goal was scored by Sergi Enrich.

On 23 September, Barcelona defeated Girona 0–3 in their first ever Catalan derby. Girona captain Aday and goalkeeper Iraizoz inadvertently steered the ball into their own net to give Barcelona a two-goal lead, before Luis Suárez topped off the scoring.

On 27 September, Barcelona defeated Sporting Lisbon 0–1 on the 2nd matchday of the Champions League, at the Estádio José Alvalade. Barça were dependent on a lone own goal by Sebastián Coates.

=== October ===
On 1 October, Barcelona defeated Las Palmas 3–0 in a game played behind closed doors at the Camp Nou, due to violence in Catalonia relating to an ongoing independence referendum. Sergio Busquets scored through a header, while Messi topped off the scoring with a brace. Prior to the game, two directors, Jordi Monés and Carles Vilarrubí, handed in their resignations in protest to the game being played.

On 3 October, Barcelona joined the country-wide strike called by ‘Taula per la Democràcia’ (Table for Democracy) and therefore the club offices remained closed. None of the professional teams nor the youth teams at FC Barcelona trained. The Tour Camp Nou Experience and the Museum as well as the OAB were also closed.

On 6 October, midfielder Andrés Iniesta signed a lifetime contract with Barcelona, keeping him with the club for the remainder of his career.

On 14 October, Barcelona were held by Atlético Madrid to a 1–1 draw at the Wanda Metropolitano, which effectively ended their winning streak. Saúl scored early into the game to give Atlético the lead, but Luis Suárez saved Barça's day with a last-gasp header.

On 18 October, Barcelona won against Olympiacos 3–1 at home. The Catalans maintained a perfect start thanks to an early own-goal, Messi's 100th European goal, and one from Digne, although the visitors did pull one back at the last minute. Barcelona had a goal ruled for offside and one deemed to have touched Piqué's hand and entered the net, resulting in his second yellow of the night, and his suspension for the return game.

On 21 October, table-toppers Barcelona defeated winless Málaga 2–0 at home. Deulofeu controversially grabbed an early goal, while Iniesta added a second later in the final half.

On 24 October, Barcelona defeated Real Murcia 3–0 in their Copa del Rey opener. Paco Alcácer scored a header just before the break, while Deulofeu scored in the second half and Barça B youngster José Arnaiz quickly added the third on his debut with the first team.

On 28 October, Barcelona won against Athletic Bilbao 0–2 away at the Nuevo San Mamés. Goals from Messi and Paulinho split the teams in Bilbao to ensure the Catalans stay four points clear at the top of the Liga table.

On 31 October, Barcelona were held by Olympiacos to a goal-less draw at the Karaiskakis Stadium in Piraeus.

=== November ===
On 4 November, Barcelona defeated Sevilla at a rainy night at the Camp Nou. Paco Alcácer opened the scoring with a goal early in the game, while Pizarro headed in the equaliser in the second half, Alcácer netted his second and also the match deciding goal few minutes later.

On 18 November, Barcelona won against Leganés 0–3 at the Estadio Municipal de Butarque. Suárez ended his 5-game goalless streak with two strikes from rebounds, while Paulinho added the final touch. Piqué received his 5th yellow card of the season, meaning he misses Barça's next match.

On 22 November, Barcelona were held to a 0–0 draw against Juventus at the Allianz Stadium, thereby qualifying for the Round of 16 of the Champions League.

On 25 November, Messi signed a new deal with Barcelona, keeping him with the club till the end of the 2020/21 season. His buyout clause was set at €700 million.

On 26 November, Barcelona tied with Valencia at the Mestalla Stadium. A Messi shot was dropped into the goal by Neto, but was disallowed by the referee. In the second half, Rodrigo put Valencia in the lead, but Jordi Alba scored through a Messi assist in the dying minutes.

On 29 November, Barcelona thrashed Real Murcia 5–0 (agg. 8–0) at the Camp Nou. Paco Alcácer, Piqué, Aleix Vidal, Denis Suárez and José Arnaiz, were the scorers.

=== December ===
On 2 December, Barcelona were held to a 2–2 draw by Celta Vigo at the Camp Nou. Iago Aspas scored at the 20-minute mark, but Messi equalized within a few minutes. Luis Suárez put Barça in the lead in the second half, but again, the score was equalized by Maxi Gómez.

On 5 December, Barcelona defeated Sporting Lisbon 2–0, with a goal from a Paco Alcácer header, and an own goal from ex-Barça player Jérémy Mathieu.

On 10 December, Barcelona won against Villarreal 0–2 at Estadio de la Cerámica. Both goals came late into the game, with one each scored by Messi and Suárez. Villarreal's Raba got a direct red for a challenge on Sergio. Messi's goal equalled the record in Europe's major leagues of the Bayern Munich striker Gerd Müller with 525 goals with one club.

On 17 December, Barcelona won against La Coruña 4–0, Suárez and Paulinho scored two goals each.

On 23 December, Barcelona defeated Real Madrid 0–3 at the Bernabéu. Suárez, Messi and Aleix Vidal each scored a goal that saw the Blaugrana head into the Christmas break 14 points clear of the defending champions.

=== January ===
On 4 January, Barcelona were held to a 1–1 draw by Celta Vigo. A gripping cup first leg ended at Balaídos all square on the night that Ousmane Dembélé made his long-awaited return from injury.

On 6 January, Barcelona announced that they had reached an agreement with Liverpool for the transfer of Philippe Coutinho. The player signed a contract for the remainder of the season and five more, and has a buyout clause of €400 million.

On 7 January, Barcelona won against Levante 3–0, Ernesto Valverde's men kicked off the New Year in La Liga with an impressive team performance and goals from Messi, Suárez and Paulinho.

On 11 January, Barcelona and Sociedade Esportiva Palmeiras reached an agreement for the transfer of Yerry Mina for the remainder of the season and five more until June 30, 2023. The cost of the transfer was €11.8 million and his release clause was set at €100 million.

On 11 January, Barcelona defeated Celta Vigo 5–0 (agg. 6–1) at the Camp Nou. Four goals in the first 31 minutes (2 from Messi and one each from Jordi Alba and Luis Suárez) got the job done early and Rakitic headed in a late fifth as the Catalans cruised into the quarter-finals of the Copa del Rey.

On 13 January, Barcelona and İstanbul Başakşehir F.K. agreed on a loan deal for Turkish midfielder Arda Turan for the remainder of the season and two more.

On 14 January, Barcelona defeated Real Sociedad away at the Anoeta Stadium with a score of 2–4. This was the first time Barça beat La Real away since May 2007. Barça were 2–0 down at the 35th minute, until Paulinho scored Barça's first in the 39th minute. Suárez scored in the 50th and 71st minute, and Messi scored a free kick in the 85th minute to complete the comeback.

On 17 January, Barcelona was defeated by Espanyol 1–0 away. Barça dominated in Cornellà but failed to find the net as the home side snatched a winner three minutes from the end.

On 19 January, Barcelona and Sergi Roberto reached an agreement to renew his contract through to 30 June 2022.

On 21 January, Barcelona beat Real Betis 0–5 away at the Estadio Benito Villamarín. Valverde's men won in style with five second-half goals within 30 minutes as Rakitic, Messi (2), and Suárez (2) all found the net.

On 22 January, Barcelona announced that they had reached an agreement with Inter Milan for the loan of Rafinha until 30 June 2018. Inter has an option to purchase the player for €35M+€3M euros in variables, which must be confirmed before the end of the current season.

On 25 January, Barcelona defeated Espanyol 2–0 (agg. 2–1) at home. Philippe Coutinho's debut, and goals from Lionel Messi and Luis Suárez brought the Camp Nou to its feet as Barça reached the semi-finals of the Copa del Rey.

On 28 January, Barcelona beat Alavés 2–1 at home. Barça equaled a club record by going unbeaten in first 21 league games of the season thanks to a second half comeback win with goals from Suárez and Messi.

On 29 January, Gerard Piqué renewed his contract through to 30 June 2022.

=== February ===
On 1 February, Barcelona defeated Valencia 1–0 at the Camp Nou. A Luis Suárez header broke the deadlock in a frustrating encounter.

On 4 February, Barcelona were held by Espanyol to a 1–1 draw away at the RCDE Stadium. Gerard Moreno's opener was cancelled out by a towering header from Gerard Piqué in a torrential downpour. This draw marked the 22nd consecutive unbeaten game in the league for Barcelona, which is a new club record, beating the previous record of 21 games under Pep Guardiola in the 2009–10 season.

On 8 February, Barcelona defeated Valencia 0–2 (0-3 on aggregate) at the Mestalla. Coutinho claimed first goal in a blaugrana jersey and Rakitic added a second to send the Catalans into the Copa del Rey final against Sevilla on April 21

On 11 February, Barcelona drew with Getafe 0–0 at the Camp Nou. The Blaugranas couldn't break down the team from Madrid's resolute defending in a hard-fought game with few clear-cut chances.

On 17 February, Barcelona beat Eibar 0–2 at Ipurua. Goals from Luis Suárez and Jordi Alba secured three hard-earned points in the Basque Country to match the Club record unbeaten run in La Liga.

On 20 February, Barcelona drew with Chelsea 1–1 at Stamford Bridge. Iniesta-Messi connection canceled out Willian's opener to set up an enticing second leg at Camp Nou in three weeks' time.

On 24 February, Barcelona defeated Girona 6–1 at the Camp Nou. A hat-trick from Suárez, two goals from Messi, plus a Coutinho special helped Barça to gain a win.

=== March ===
On 1 March, Barcelona were held by Las Palmas to a 1–1 draw away from home. A wondrous Messi free kick puts the Catalans in command but the Islanders leveled up from the spot.

On 4 March, Barcelona won against Atlético Madrid 1–0 at home. Another Lionel Messi special was enough for Barça to see off determined opponents who fought for the win right to the very end.

On 7 March, Barcelona defeated Espanyol at the Camp d'Esports in Lleida. The third edition of the Supercopa de Catalunya went down to penalties in Lleida, and the Blaugrana made no mistake and brought the trophy home.

On 10 March, Barcelona won against Málaga 0–2 away. Fabulous first half goals from Suárez and Coutinho were enough to secure a comfortable victory in a top-against-bottom clash.

On 11 March, FC Barcelona confirmed that an agreement had been reached with Grêmio for the purchase option of Brazilian midfielder Arthur. If Barcelona exercises the option in July 2018, the transfer will cost €30m plus €9m in added variables.

On 14 March, Barcelona won against Chelsea 3–0 (agg. 4–1). Dembélé notched his debut goal and Messi scored his 99th and 100th career Champions League goals as Barça went through to the last eight for a record-extending 11th straight season.

On 18 March, Barcelona defeated Athletic Bilbao 2–0 at the Camp Nou. A scintillating first-half display from the Blaugranes secured a comfortable 2–0 win with goals from Alcácer and Messi at the Camp Nou.

On 31 March, Barcelona recorded a heart-stopping 2–2 draw at the Ramón Sánchez Pizjuán. Two late goals from Luis Suárez and Lionel Messi earned a draw for Barça after Sevilla had opened up a two-goal lead through Franco Vázquez and Luis Muriel.

=== April ===
On 4 April, Barça took a 4–1 aggregate lead into the second leg after two own goals by Roma and a third from Gerard Piqué; Edin Dzeko answered for Roma before Luis Suárez added some late insurance.

On 7 April, Barca defeated Leganes 3–1 drawing level with the joint-record of 38 unbeaten games set by Real Sociedad, thanks to a Messi hat-trick.

On 10 April, Barça lost 3–0 to Roma. Goals from Džeko, De Rossi and Manolas allowed the Italians to turn around a three-goal deficit and qualify for the semi-finals on the away goals rule.

On 14 April, Barca defeated València 2–1 with goals from Luis Suárez and Samuel Umtiti that secured the longest unbeaten streak (39) in La Liga history.

On 17 April, ten-man Barça held on for a 2–2 draw with Celta Vigo at Balaídos. Ousmane Dembélé scored his first La Liga goal and Paco Alcácer got the other. Sergi Roberto was sent off in the 71st minute but Barca held on to remain unbeaten in the league.

On 21 April, Barcelona cruised to their fourth consecutive Copa del Rey title as they beat Sevilla 5–0 at the Wanda Metropolitano. The goals were scored by Luis Suarez (2), Messi, Iniesta and Coutinho.

On 27 April, Andrés Iniesta announced that he would be leaving the club at the end of the season after 22 incredible years. Iniesta, a World Cup winner with Spain, won nine La Liga titles alongside four Champions League wins and six Copa del Rey crowns.

On 29 April, Barcelona defeated Deportivo La Coruna 4–2 to win their 25th La Liga title. Coutinho scored the opening goal before Messi sealed the title with a hat trick.

=== May ===
On 6 May, 10-man Barcelona held on for a dramatic 2–2 draw in El Clasico against Real Madrid to extend their unbeaten streak in the league. Luis Suarez and Leo Messi scored the goals for Barca which were cancelled out by goals from Cristiano Ronaldo and Gareth Bale. Sergi Roberto was sent off in first-half injury time following an altercation with Marcelo.

On 9 May, a much changed Barcelona side defeated Villarreal 5–1. Barca's new signings Coutinho, Paulinho and Dembele (2) were all on target with Messi getting the other goal.

On 13 May, Barcelona's unbeaten run came to the end when they lost to Levante 4–5. Barcelona mounted a spirited comeback after trailing 1–5 but fell agonizingly short. The only bright spot in the game was a hat-trick by Philippe Coutinho. The other goal was scored by Luis Suarez from the penalty spot.

On 20 May, Barcelona defeated Real Sociedad 1–0 in Iniesta's final game as a Barcelona player. The only goal of the game was a breathtaking strike from Iniesta's heir apparent – Coutinho. Iniesta received a standing ovation from the Camp Nou when he was substituted in the 82nd minute. This game also marked the last appearance for Real Sociedad legend Xabi Prieto.

== Kit ==
Home	Home 2018–19	Away	Third	Goalkeeper 1	Goalkeeper 2	Goalkeeper 3	Goalkeeper 2018–19

== Players ==
=== Squad information ===
N	Pos.	Nat.	Name	Age	EU	Since	App	Goals	Ends	Transfer fee	Notes
1	GK	(Germany)	Marc-André ter Stegen	26	EU	2014	131	0	2022	€12M	
2	RB	(Portugal)	Nélson Semedo	24	EU	2017	26	0	2021	€30M	
3	CB	(Spain)	Gerard Piqué (4th captain)	31	EU	2008	435	38	2022	€5M	Originally from Youth system
4	MF	(Croatia)	Ivan Rakitić	30	EU	2014	204	30	2021	€18M	
5	MF	(Spain)	Sergio Busquets (3rd captain)	29	EU	2008	473	13	2021	YS	
6	MF	(Spain)	Denis Suárez	24	EU	2016	56	6	2020	€3.25M	Originally from Youth system
8	MF	(Spain)	Andrés Iniesta (captain)	34	EU	2002	674	57	lifetime	YS	
9	FW	(Uruguay)	Luis Suárez	31	Non-EU	2014	187	145	2021	€81M	
10	FW	(Argentina)	Lionel Messi (vice-captain)	30	EU	2004	637	552	2021	YS	Second nationality: Spain
11	FW	(France)	Ousmane Dembélé	21	EU	2017	13	2	2022	€105M	
13	GK	(Netherlands)	Jasper Cillessen	29	EU	2016	19	0	2021	€13M	
14	MF	(Brazil)	Philippe Coutinho	25	EU	2018	12	3	2023	€120M	Second nationality- Portuguese
15	MF	(Brazil)	Paulinho	29	Non-EU	2017	41	8	2021	€40M	
17	FW	(Spain)	Paco Alcácer	24	EU	2016	44	14	2021	€30M	
18	LB	(Spain)	Jordi Alba	28	EU	2012	237	12	2020	€14M	Originally from Youth system
19	LB	(France)	Lucas Digne	24	EU	2016	44	2	2021	€16.5M	
20	RB	(Spain)	Sergi Roberto	26	EU	2010	193	7	2022	YS	
21	MF	(Portugal)	André Gomes	24	EU	2016	74	3	2021	€35M	
22	RB	(Spain)	Aleix Vidal	28	EU	2015	50	4	2020	€18M	Originally from Youth system
23	CB	(France)	Samuel Umtiti	24	EU	2016	76	1	2021	€25M	
24	CB	(Colombia)	Yerry Mina	23	Non-EU	2018	2	0	2023	€11.8M	
25	CB	(Belgium)	Thomas Vermaelen	32	EU	2014	37	1	2019	€15M	

- Last updated: 30 May 2018
- Source: FCBarcelona.com, Champions League 2017/18 numbers, Players in / out, Wikipedia players' articles, ESPN (for appearances and goals) and footballdatabase.com (for EU passport)

==== From youth squad ====
Note: Flags indicate national team as defined under FIFA eligibility rules; some limited exceptions apply. Players may hold more than one non-FIFA nationality.

No.	Pos.	Nation	Player
26	MF	ESP	Carles Aleñá
27	FW	ESP	Carles Pérez
28	MF	ESP	Ferrán Sarsanedas
29	FW	ESP	Abel Ruiz
30	MF	ESP	Oriol Busquets
31	GK	ESP	Adrián Ortolá
33	DF	ESP	Sergi Palencia

No.	Pos.	Nation	Player
34	DF	ESP	Dani Morer
35	DF	ESP	Rodrigo Tarín
36	DF	ESP	Marc Cucurella
37	FW	ESP	José Arnáiz
39	DF	ESP	David Costas
40	MF	ESP	Iñigo Ruiz de Galarreta
41	DF	ESP	Jorge Cuenca

=== Players in ===
No.	Pos.	Nat.	Name	Age	EU	Moving from	Type	Transfer window	Ends	Transfer fee	Source
—	DF	(Brazil)	Douglas	26	Non-EU	(Spain) Sporting Gijón	Loan return	Summer	2019	Free	FCBarcelona.com
25	DF	(Belgium)	Thomas Vermaelen	31	EU	(Italy) Roma	Loan return	Summer	2019	Free	FCBarcelona.com
—	MF	(Spain)	Sergi Samper	22	EU	(Spain) Granada	Loan return	Summer	2019	Free	FCBarcelona.com
—	FW	(Spain)	Munir	21	EU	(Spain) Valencia	Loan return	Summer	2019	Free	FCBarcelona.com
24	DF	(Brazil)	Marlon Santos	21	Non-EU	(Brazil) Fluminense	Transfer	Summer	2020	€5M	FCBarcelona.com
16	FW	(Spain)	Gerard Deulofeu	23	EU	(England) Everton	Transfer	Summer	2019	€12M	FCBarcelona.com
2	DF	(Portugal)	Nélson Semedo	23	EU	(Portugal) Benfica	Transfer	Summer	2021	€30M (Note: Barcelona will pay extra 5 million euros for every 50 Semedo's future appearances for the club)	FCBarcelona.com
15	MF	(Brazil)	Paulinho	29	Non-EU	(China) Guangzhou Evergrande	Transfer	Summer	2021	€40M	FCBarcelona.com
11	FW	(France)	Ousmane Dembélé	20	EU	(Germany) Borussia Dortmund	Transfer	Summer	2022	€105M+€40M	FCBarcelona.com
14	MF	(Brazil)	Philippe Coutinho	25	Non-EU	(England) Liverpool	Transfer	Winter	2023	€120M+€40M	FCBarcelona.com
24	DF	(Colombia)	Yerry Mina	23	Non-EU	(Brazil) Palmeiras	Transfer	Winter	2023	€11.8M	FCBarcelona.com
—	MF	(Spain)	Sergi Samper	23	EU	(Spain) Las Palmas	Loan return	Winter	2019	Free	UDLasPalmas.es

Total spending: ▼€323.8 million

=== Players out ===
No.	Pos.	Nat.	Name	Age	EU	Moving to	Type	Transfer window	Transfer fee	Source
25	GK	(Spain)	Jordi Masip	28	EU	(Spain) Real Valladolid	Contract expired	Summer	Free	RealValladolid.es
—	FW	(Spain)	Cristian Tello	25	EU	(Spain) Real Betis	Transfer	Summer	€4M+€1M	RealBetisBalompie.es
24	DF	(France)	Jérémy Mathieu	33	EU	(Portugal) Sporting CP	Contract termination	Summer	Free	Sporting.pt
11	FW	(Brazil)	Neymar	25	EU	(France) Paris Saint-Germain	Transfer	Summer	€222M	PSG.fr
—	MF	(Spain)	Sergi Samper	22	EU	(Spain) Las Palmas	Loan	Summer	Free	UDLasPalmas.es
24	CB	(Brazil)	Marlon Santos	21	Non-EU	(France) Nice	Loan	Summer	Free	OGCNice.com
—	RB	(Brazil)	Douglas	27	Non-EU	(Portugal) Benfica	Loan	Summer	Free	SLBenfica.pt
—	FW	(Spain)	Munir	21	EU	(Spain) Alavés	Loan	Summer	Free	DeportivoAlavés.com
7	MF	(Turkey)	Arda Turan	30	EU	(Turkey) İstanbul Başakşehir	Loan	Winter	Free	IBFK.com.tr
12	MF	(Brazil)	Rafinha	24	EU	(Italy) Internazionale	Loan	Winter	Free	Inter.it
14	DF	(Argentina)	Javier Mascherano	33	EU	Hebei China Fortune	Transfer	Winter	€5.5M	HebeiFootball.com
16	FW	(Spain)	Gerard Deulofeu	23	EU	(England) Watford	Loan	Winter	Free	WatfordFC.com

Total income: ▲€231.5 million

Net: ▼€92.3 million

== Statistics ==
=== Squad appearances and goals ===
Last updated on 27 May 2018.

No.	Pos	Nat	Player	Total		La Liga		Champions League		Copa del Rey		Supercopa	
No.	Pos	Nat	Player	Apps	Goals	Apps	Goals	Apps	Goals	Apps	Goals	Apps	Goals
Goalkeepers
1	GK	(Germany) GER	Marc-André ter Stegen	48	0	37	0	9	0	0	0	2	0
13	GK	(Netherlands) NED	Jasper Cillessen	12	0	1	0	1	0	10	0	0	0
31	GK	(Spain) ESP	Adrián Ortolá	0	0	0	0	0	0	0	0	0	0
Defenders
2	DF	(Portugal) POR	Nélson Semedo	36	0	24	0	7	0	4	0	1	0
3	DF	(Spain) ESP	Gerard Piqué	50	4	30	2	9	1	9	1	2	0
18	DF	(Spain) ESP	Jordi Alba	46	3	33	2	6	0	5	1	2	0
19	DF	(France) FRA	Lucas Digne	19	1	11	0	3	1	4	0	1	0
22	DF	(Spain) ESP	Aleix Vidal	25	2	15	1	5	0	4	1	1	0
23	DF	(France) FRA	Samuel Umtiti	41	1	25	1	9	0	5	0	2	0
24	DF	(Colombia) COL	Yerry Mina	6	0	5	0	0	0	1	0	0	0
25	DF	(Belgium) BEL	Thomas Vermaelen	20	0	14	0	1	0	5	0	0	0
36	DF	(Spain) ESP	Marc Cucurella	1	0	0	0	0	0	1	0	0	0
39	DF	(Spain) ESP	David Costas	1	0	0	0	0	0	1	0	0	0
Midfielders
4	MF	(Croatia) CRO	Ivan Rakitić	56	4	35	1	10	1	9	2	2	0
5	MF	(Spain) ESP	Sergio Busquets	50	1	31	1	10	0	7	0	2	0
6	MF	(Spain) ESP	Denis Suárez	27	3	17	2	3	0	6	1	1	0
8	MF	(Spain) ESP	Andrés Iniesta	45	3	31	1	8	0	5	2	1	0
14	MF	(Brazil) BRA	Philippe Coutinho	23	11	18	8	0	0	5	3	0	0
15	MF	(Brazil) BRA	Paulinho	49	9	34	9	9	0	6	0	0	0
20	MF	(Spain) ESP	Sergi Roberto	46	1	29	1	8	0	7	0	2	0
21	MF	(Portugal) POR	André Gomes	31	0	15	0	9	0	6	0	1	0
26	MF	(Spain) ESP	Carles Aleñá	3	0	0	0	0	0	3	0	0	0
30	MF	(Spain) ESP	Oriol Busquets	1	0	0	0	0	0	1	0	0	0
Forwards
9	FW	(Uruguay) URU	Luis Suárez	51	33	33	25	10	1	6	7	2	0
10	FW	(Argentina) ARG	Lionel Messi	55	46	36	34	10	6	7	5	2	1
11	FW	(France) FRA	Ousmane Dembélé	24	4	17	3	3	1	4	0	0	0
17	FW	(Spain) ESP	Paco Alcácer	21	7	16	4	2	1	2	2	1	0
37	FW	(Spain) ESP	José Arnaiz	5	3	1	0	0	0	4	3	0	0
Players who have made an appearance or had a squad number this season but have left the club
7	MF	(Turkey) TUR	Arda Turan	0	0	0	0	0	0	0	0	0	0
12	MF	(Brazil) BRA	Rafinha	1	0	0	0	0	0	1	0	0	0
14	DF	(Argentina) ARG	Javier Mascherano	12	0	7	0	2	0	2	0	1	0
16	FW	(Spain) ESP	Gerard Deulofeu	17	2	10	1	3	0	2	1	2	0

=== Squad statistics ===
	League	Europe	Cup	Others	Total Stats
Games played	38	10	9	2	59
Games won	28	6	7	0	41
Games drawn	9	3	1	0	13
Games lost	1	1	1	2	5
Goals scored	99	17	24	1	141
Goals conceded	29	6	2	5	42
Goal difference	70	11	22	-4	99
Clean sheets	19	6	6	0	31
Goal by Substitute	5	0	2	0	7
Total shots	–	–	–	–	–
Shots on target	–	–	–	–	–
Corners	–	–	–	–	–
Players used	–	–	–	–	–
Offsides	–	–	–	–	–
Fouls suffered	–	–	–	–	–
Fouls committed	–	–	–	–	–
Yellow cards	66	21	11	5	103
Red cards	2	1	0	0	3

Last updated: 17 April 2018
Source: La Liga statistics, UEFA Champions League statistics, Copa Del Rey statistics

Players Used: Barcelona has used a total of – different players in all competitions.

=== Goalscorers ===
No.	Pos.	Nation	Name	La Liga	Champions League	Copa del Rey	Supercopa de España	Total
10	FW	(Argentina)	Messi	34	6	4	1	45
9	FW	(Uruguay)	Suárez	25	1	5	0	31
14	MF	(Brazil)	Coutinho	8	0	2	0	10
15	MF	(Brazil)	Paulinho	9	0	0	0	9
17	FW	(Spain)	Paco Alcácer	4	1	2	0	7
3	DF	(Spain)	Piqué	2	1	1	0	4
4	MF	(Croatia)	I. Rakitić	1	1	2	0	4
11	FW	(France)	O. Dembélé	3	1	0	0	4
6	MF	(Spain)	Denis Suárez	2	0	1	0	3
18	DF	(Spain)	Jordi Alba	2	0	1	0	3
37	FW	(Spain)	José Arnaiz	0	0	3	0	3
8	MF	(Spain)	A. Iniesta	1	0	1	0	2
22	DF	(Spain)	Aleix Vidal	1	0	1	0	2
5	MF	(Spain)	Sergio	1	0	0	0	1
19	DF	(France)	Digne	0	1	0	0	1
20	MF	(Spain)	S. Roberto	1	0	0	0	1
23	DF	(France)	Umtiti	1	0	0	0	1
~~16~~	FW	(Spain)	Deulofeu	1	0	1	0	2
Own goals				3	5	0	0	8
TOTAL				99	17	24	1	141

Last updated: 9 May 2018

=== Hat-tricks ===
Player	Against	Result	Date	Competition
(Argentina) Messi	(Spain) Espanyol	5–0 (H)	9 September 2017	La Liga
(Argentina) Messi^{4}	(Spain) Eibar	6–1 (H)	19 September 2017	La Liga
(Uruguay) Suárez	(Spain) Girona	6–1 (H)	24 February 2018	La Liga
(Argentina) Messi	(Spain) Leganés	3–1 (H)	7 April 2018	La Liga
(Argentina) Messi	(Spain) Deportivo La Coruña	4–2 (A)	29 April 2018	La Liga
(Brazil) Coutinho	(Spain) Levante	4–5 (A)	13 May 2018	La Liga

(H) – Home; (A) – Away

=== Clean sheets ===
Last updated on 17 April 2018.

Rank	Name	La Liga	Copa del Rey	Champions League	Supercopa de España	Total	Games played
—	(Germany) Ter Stegen	18	0	5	0	23	44
—	(Netherlands) Cillessen	0	6	1	0	7	9
Total		18	6	6	0	30	53

=== Disciplinary record ===
Includes all competitive matches. Players listed below (excluding goalkeepers) made at least one appearance for Barcelona first squad during the season.

N	P	Nat.	Name	La Liga			Champions League			Copa del Rey			Supercopa de España			Total			Notes
N	P	Nat.	Name	Yellow card	Second yellow card	Red card	Yellow card	Second yellow card	Red card	Yellow card	Second yellow card	Red card	Yellow card	Second yellow card	Red card	Yellow card	Second yellow card	Red card	Notes
2	DF	(Portugal)	N. Semedo	1			3									4			
3	DF	(Spain)	Piqué	8			1	1					1			10	1		
4	MF	(Croatia)	I. Rakitić	3			1			1						5			
5	MF	(Spain)	Sergio	7			1			1			1			10			
8	MF	(Spain)	A. Iniesta	1						1						2			
9	FW	(Uruguay)	Suárez	6			2			2			1			11			Ban sustained - 2 Games(Copa del Rey) for stay in the ground; Banned on 9 February 2017 - Returned on November 2017
10	FW	(Argentina)	Messi	3			2			1			1			7			
11	FW	(France)	O. Dembélé	2												2			
14	MF	(Brazil)	Coutinho	1												1			
15	MF	(Brazil)	Paulinho	2			1									3			
18	DF	(Spain)	Jordi Alba	6						2						8			
19	DF	(France)	Digne	2			1									3			
20	MF	(Spain)	S. Roberto	3		2	2			1						6		2	Ban sustained - 4 Games(Spain) for punching deliberately; Banned on 9 May 2018 - Returned on August 2018
21	MF	(Portugal)	André Gomes	1			1			1						3			
22	DF	(Spain)	Aleix Vidal				1									1			
23	DF	(France)	Umtiti	7												7			
24	DF	(Colombia)	Yerry Mina	1												1			
25	DF	(Belgium)	Vermaelen	2						1						3			
37	DF	(Spain)	José Arnaiz							1						1			
~~14~~	MF	(Argentina)	Mascherano										1			1			
~~16~~	FW	(Spain)	Deulofeu	1												1			

Last updated: 9 May 2018
Source: ESPNFC.com, FCBarcelona.com
Ordered by (red card) , (second yellow card) and (yellow card)
(yellow card) = Number of bookings; (second yellow card) = Number of sending offs after a second yellow card; (red card) = Number of sending offs by a direct red card.

=== Injury record ===
N	P	Nat.	Name	Type	Status	Source	Match	Inj. Date	Ret. Date
8	MF	(Spain)	A. Iniesta	Thigh injury		FCB.com	vs Real Madrid	16 August 2017	24 August 2017
3	DF	(Spain)	Piqué	Groin strain (in left leg)		FCB.com	vs Real Madrid	16 August 2017	26 August 2017
9	FW	(Uruguay)	Suárez	Knee injury (posterior articular capsule distention in right leg)		FCB.com	vs Real Madrid	16 August 2017	31 August 2017
7	MF	(Turkey)	Arda	Hamstring strain (in left leg)		FCB.com	vs Croatia with Turkey	5 September 2017	18 September 2017
20	MF	(Spain)	S. Roberto	Knee injury (in left leg)		FCB.com	in training	8 September 2017	12 September 2017
11	FW	(France)	O. Dembélé	Femoral bicep tendon rupture (in left leg)		FCB.com	vs Getafe	16 September 2017	2 January 2018
8	MF	(Spain)	A. Iniesta	Hamstring strain (in left leg)		FCB.com	vs Las Palmas	1 October 2017	13 October 2017
7	MF	(Turkey)	Arda	Bruised metatarsal		FCB.com	vs Iceland with Turkey	6 October 2017	20 October 2017
18	DF	(Spain)	Jordi Alba	Hamstring injury		FCB.com	in training	17 October 2017	27 October 2017
22	DF	(Spain)	Aleix Vidal	Ankle injury		FCB.com	in training	October 2017	7 October 2017
7	MF	(Turkey)	Arda	Ankle injury		FCB.com	in training	October 2017	6 December 2017
8	MF	(Spain)	A. Iniesta	Hamstring strain (in right leg)		FCB.com	in training	27 October 2017	3 November 2017
25	DF	(Belgium)	Vermaelen	Hip injury		FCB.com	in training	27 October 2017	29 October 2017
20	MF	(Spain)	S. Roberto	Hamstring strain (in right leg)		FCB.com	vs Olympiacos	31 October 2017	28 November 2017
21	MF	(Portugal)	André Gomes	Thigh injury (in right leg)		FCB.com	vs Olympiacos	31 October 2017	1 December 2017
14	DF	(Argentina)	Mascherano	Hamstring injury (in right leg)		FCB.com	vs Nigeria with Argentina	14 November 2017	17 December 2017
23	DF	(France)	Umtiti	Hamstring injury (in right leg)		FCB.com	vs Celta Vigo	2 December 2017	20 January 2018
8	MF	(Spain)	A. Iniesta	Muscle fatigue (in left calf)		FCB.com	vs Celta Vigo	2 December 2017	17 December 2017
16	MF	(Spain)	Deulofeu	Strained ligaments (in left knee)		FCB.com	in training	15 December 2017	29 December 2017
17	FW	(Spain)	Paco Alcácer	Muscular injury (in left leg)		FCB.com	vs Deportivo	17 December 2017	24 January 2018
14	MF	(Brazil)	Coutinho	Muscular injury (in right thigh)		FCB.com	in training with Liverpool	30 December 2017	24 January 2018
11	FW	(France)	O. Dembélé	Hamstring injury (in left leg)		FCB.com	vs Real Sociedad	14 January 2018	10 February 2018
8	MF	(Spain)	A. Iniesta	Calf injury (in right leg)		FCB.com	in training	14 January 2018	24 January 2018
14	DF	(Argentina)	Mascherano	Thigh injury (in left leg)		FCB.com	in training	16 January 2018	January 2018
25	DF	(Belgium)	Vermaelen	Hamstring injury (in left leg)		FCB.com	vs Real Betis	21 January 2018	17 February 2018
—	MF	(Spain)	Samper	Fractured malleolus (in left ankle)		FCB.com	vs Eibar with Las Palmas	6 January 2018	12 July 2018
2	DF	(Portugal)	N. Semedo	Hamstring injury (in left leg)		FCB.com	vs Girona	24 February 2018	30 March 2018
8	MF	(Spain)	A. Iniesta	Calf injury (in right leg)		FCB.com	vs Atlético Madrid	4 March 2018	13 March 2018
6	MF	(Spain)	Denis Suárez	Groin strain (in left leg)		FCB.com	vs Espanyol	7 March 2018	30 March 2018
5	MF	(Spain)	Sergio	Fractured toe (in right leg)		FCB.com	vs Chelsea	14 March 2018	3 April 2018
19	DF	(France)	Digne	Thigh injury (in left leg)		FCB.com	vs Colombia with France	23 March 2018	16 April 2018
4	MF	(Croatia)	I. Rakitić	Fractured finger (in left hand)		FCB.com	vs Roma	10 April 2018	21 April 2018

== Pre-season and friendlies ==
Win Draw Loss

=== International Champions Cup ===
22 July 2017 ICC 1	Juventus	1–2	Barcelona	East Rutherford, United States
18:00 EDT	Marchisio (yellow card) 43'; Chiellini 63'	Report	Neymar 15', 26'; Vidal (yellow card) 35'	Stadium: MetLife Stadium; Attendance: 82,104; Referee: Edvin Jurisevic (United States)

26 July 2017 ICC 2	Barcelona	1–0	Manchester United	Landover, United States
19:30 EDT	Neymar 31'	Report	Fellaini (yellow card) 83'	Stadium: FedExField; Attendance: 80,162; Referee: Armando Villarreal (United States)

29 July 2017 ICC 3	Real Madrid	2–3	Barcelona	Miami, United States
20:05 EDT	Kovačić 14'; Varane (yellow card) 22'; Asensio 36'; Carvajal (yellow card) 60'	Report	Messi 3'; Rakitić 7'; Piqué 50'; L. Suárez (yellow card) 60'; Samper (yellow card) 78'	Stadium: Hard Rock Stadium; Attendance: 66,014; Referee: Jair Marrufo (United States)

=== Friendlies ===
4 August 2017	Gimnàstic	1–1	Barcelona	Tarragona, Spain
20:00 CEST	Barreiro 11'; Zahibo (yellow card) 84'; Muñiz (yellow card) 90+1'	Report	Samper (yellow card) 58'; Alcácer 78'	Stadium: Nou Estadi; Attendance: 11,928; Referee: Varón Aceitón (Balearic Islands)

16 May 2018	Mamelodi Sundowns	1–3	Barcelona	Johannesburg, South Africa
18:15 SAST	Vilakazi 76'	Report	Dembélé 3'; L. Suárez 19'; Gomes 67'	Stadium: FNB Stadium

=== Joan Gamper Trophy ===
7 August 2017	Barcelona	5–0	Chapecoense	Barcelona, Spain
20:30 CEST	Deulofeu 6'; Busquets 11'; Messi 28'; L. Suárez 55'; D. Suárez 74'	Report	Lucas (yellow card) 69'	Stadium: Camp Nou; Attendance: 64,705; Referee: Álvarez Izquierdo (Spain)

=== Supercopa de Catalunya ===
7 March 2018	Barcelona	0–0 (4–2 p)	Espanyol	Lleida
18:45 CET		Report		Stadium: Camp d'Esports; Attendance: 10,576; Referee: Estrada Fernández (Spain)
	Penalties
	Alcácer (penalty scored) Palencia (penalty scored) Mina (penalty scored) Ruiz (penalty scored)		(penalty missed) Darder (penalty scored) Á. López (penalty scored) Hermoso (penalty missed) Jurado

== Competitions ==
Win Draw Loss

=== Overview ===
Competition	First match	Last match	Starting round	Final position	Record							
Competition	First match	Last match	Starting round	Final position	Pld	W	D	L	GF	GA	GD	Win %
La Liga	20 August 2017	20 May 2018	Matchday 1	Winners	38	28	9	1	99	29	+70	73.68
Copa del Rey	24 October 2017	21 April 2018	Round of 32	Winners	9	7	1	1	24	2	+22	77.78
Supercopa de España	13 August 2017	16 August 2017	Final	Runners-up	2	0	0	2	1	5	−4	0.00
Champions League	12 September 2017	10 April 2018	Group stage	Quarter-finals	10	6	3	1	17	6	+11	60.00
Total					59	41	13	5	141	42	+99	69.49

Last updated: 20 May 2018.
Source: Competitions

=== Standings ===
Pos	Team	Pld	W	D	L	GF	GA	GD	Pts	Qualification or relegation
1	Barcelona (C)	38	28	9	1	99	29	+70	93	Qualification for the Champions League group stage
2	Atlético Madrid	38	23	10	5	58	22	+36	79	Qualification for the Champions League group stage
3	Real Madrid	38	22	10	6	94	44	+50	76	Qualification for the Champions League group stage
4	Valencia	38	22	7	9	65	38	+27	73	Qualification for the Champions League group stage
5	Villarreal	38	18	7	13	57	50	+7	61	Qualification for the Europa League group stage (Note: Since the winners of the 2017–18 Copa del Rey, Barcelona, qualified for European competition based on league position, the spot awarded to the cup winners (Europa League group stage) was passed to the sixth-placed team and the spot awarded to the sixth-placed team (Europa League second qualifying round) was passed to the seventh-placed team.)

Source: La Liga, Soccerway
Rules for classification: 1) Points; 2) Head-to-head points; 3) Head-to-head goal difference; 4) Goal difference; 5) Goals scored; 6) Fair-play points (Note: Head-to-head record is used only after all the matches between the teams in question have been played)
(C) Champions

==== Results summary ====
Overall								Home						Away					
Pld	W	D	L	GF	GA	GD	Pts	W	D	L	GF	GA	GD	W	D	L	GF	GA	GD
38	28	9	1	99	29	+70	93	16	3	0	53	11	+42	12	6	1	46	18	+28

Last updated: 20 May 2018.
Source: LaLiga

==== Results by round ====
Round	1	2	3	4	5	6	7	8	9	10	11	12	13	14	15	16	17	18	19	20	21	22	23	24	25	26	27	28	29	30	31	32	33	34	35	36	37	38
Ground	H	A	H	A	H	A	H	A	H	A	H	A	A	H	A	H	A	H	A	A	H	A	H	A	H	A	H	A	H	A	H	H	A	H	A	H	A	H
Result	W	W	W	W	W	W	W	D	W	W	W	W	D	D	W	W	W	W	W	W	W	D	D	W	W	D	W	W	W	D	W	W	D	W	W	D	L	W
Position	2	2	1	1	1	1	1	1	1	1	1	1	1	1	1	1	1	1	1	1	1	1	1	1	1	1	1	1	1	1	1	1	1	1	1	1	1	1

Updated to match(es) played on 20 May 2018. Source: LaLiga
A = Away; H = Home; W = Win; D = Draw; L = Loss

==== Matches ====
20 August 2017 1	Barcelona	2–0	Real Betis	Barcelona
20:15 CEST	Toșca 36' (o.g.); Roberto 39'; Alba (yellow card) 52'; Digne (yellow card) 90+2'	Report	Matías Nahuel (yellow card) 63'	Stadium: Camp Nou; Attendance: 56,480; Referee: Trujillo Suárez (Tenerife)

26 August 2017 2	Alavés	0–2	Barcelona	Vitoria-Gasteiz
18:15 CEST	Wakaso (yellow card) 36'; Ely (yellow card) 38'	Report	Umtiti (yellow card) 32'; Roberto (yellow card) 41'; Piqué (yellow card) 45'; Messi 55', 66'	Stadium: Mendizorrotza; Attendance: 19,356; Referee: Del Cerro Grande (Community of Madrid)

9 September 2017 3	Barcelona	5–0	Espanyol	Barcelona
20:45 CEST	Busquets (yellow card) 21'; Messi 26', 35', 67'; Piqué 87'; L. Suárez 90'	Report	David López (yellow card) 29'; V. Sánchez (yellow card) 60'; Darder (yellow card) 71'; Martín (yellow card) 74'; Diop (yellow card) 84'	Stadium: Camp Nou; Attendance: 72,857; Referee: Gil Manzano (Extremadura)

16 September 2017 4	Getafe	1–2	Barcelona	Getafe
16:15 CEST	Cala (yellow card) 32'; Shibasaki 39'; Damián Suárez (yellow card) 88'	Report	Piqué (yellow card) 10'; Deulofeu (yellow card) 53'; Denis Suárez 62'; Alba (yellow card) 66'; L. Suárez (yellow card) 73'; Paulinho 84'	Stadium: Coliseum Alfonso Pérez; Attendance: 15,164; Referee: Fernández Borbalán (Andalusia)

19 September 2017 5	Barcelona	6–1	Eibar	Barcelona
22:00 CEST	Messi 20' (pen.), 59', 62', 87'; Paulinho 38'; D. Suárez 53'	Report	Capa (yellow card) 10'; Enrich 57'; Gálvez (yellow card) 80'	Stadium: Camp Nou; Attendance: 51,645; Referee: Hernández Hernández (Las Palmas)

23 September 2017 6	Girona	0–3	Barcelona	Girona
20:45 CEST	Maffeo (yellow card) 23'; Aday (yellow card) 41'; Kayode (yellow card) 83'	Report	Aday 17' (o.g.); Iraizoz 48' (o.g.); L. Suárez 69'	Stadium: Montilivi; Attendance: 13,305; Referee: José María Sánchez Martínez (Region of Murcia)

1 October 2017 7	Barcelona	3–0	Las Palmas	Barcelona
16:15 CEST	Paulinho (yellow card) 33'; Piqué (yellow card) 35'; Busquets (yellow card) 45', (goal) 49'; Alba (yellow card) 46'; L. Suárez (yellow card) 51'; Messi 70', 77'	Report	Navarro (yellow card) 59'	Stadium: Camp Nou; Attendance: 0 Referee: José Luis Munuera Montero (Andalusia)

14 October 2017 8	Atlético Madrid	1–1	Barcelona	Madrid
20:45 CEST	Gabi (yellow card) 14'; Saúl 21', (yellow card) 90'; Griezmann (yellow card) 90'	Report	Umtiti (yellow card) 33'; Rakitić (yellow card) 46'; L. Suárez 82'	Stadium: Wanda Metropolitano; Attendance: 64,393; Referee: Mateu Lahoz (Valencian Community)

21 October 2017 9	Barcelona	2–0	Málaga	Barcelona
20:45 CEST	Deulofeu 2'; Iniesta 56'; Umtiti (yellow card) 74'	Report	Rosales (yellow card) 21'; Hernández (yellow card) 26'; Adrián (yellow card) 39'; Cecchini (yellow card) 82'	Stadium: Camp Nou; Attendance: 74,397; Referee: González Fuertes (Asturias)

28 October 2017 10	Athletic Bilbao	0–2	Barcelona	Bilbao
20:45 CEST	Iturraspe (yellow card) 41'	Report	Messi 36'; Busquets (yellow card) 47'; Piqué (yellow card) 63'; Paulinho (yellow card) 75', (goal) 90+2'; Umtiti (yellow card) 81'	Stadium: San Mamés; Attendance: 43,570; Referee: Juan Martínez Munuera (Valencia)

4 November 2017 11	Barcelona	2–1	Sevilla	Barcelona
20:45 CET	Alcácer 23', 65'; Messi (yellow card) 90+4'	Report	Pizarro 59'	Stadium: Camp Nou; Attendance: 70,723; Referee: González González (Castile and León)

18 November 2017 12	Leganés	0–3	Barcelona	Leganés
16:15 CET	Siovas (yellow card) 72'	Report	L. Suárez 28', 60'; Piqué (yellow card) 29'; Paulinho 90'	Stadium: Butarque; Attendance: 11,454; Referee: Undiano Mallenco (Navarre)
Note: Suárez was given a yellow card ( (yellow card) 53') which was later rescinded by the Royal Spanish Football Federation.

26 November 2017 13	Valencia	1–1	Barcelona	Valencia
20:45 CET	Kondogbia (yellow card) 32'; Gabriel (yellow card) 44'; Rodrigo 60', (yellow card) 74'; Pereira (yellow card) 89'	Report	Alba 82'	Stadium: Mestalla; Attendance: 47,775; Referee: Iglesias Villanueva (Galicia)

2 December 2017 14	Barcelona	2–2	Celta Vigo	Barcelona
13:00 CET	L. Suárez (yellow card) 1', (goal) 62'; Messi 22'; Vermaelen (yellow card) 83'; Piqué (yellow card) 90+6'	Report	Aspas 20'; M. Gómez 70'; Roncaglia (yellow card) 74'; Jozabed (yellow card) 81'; Blanco (yellow card) 86'; Wass (yellow card) 87'; Sisto (yellow card) 88'; Mallo (yellow card) 90+5'	Stadium: Camp Nou; Attendance: 63,208; Referee: Melero López (Andalusia)

10 December 2017 15	Villarreal	0–2	Barcelona	Vilarreal
20:45 CET	Raba (red card) 60'; Bakambu (yellow card) 61'; Álvaro (yellow card) 86'	Report	Busquets (yellow card) 45'; L. Suárez 72'; Messi 83'	Stadium: La Cerámica; Attendance: 21,087; Referee: Ricardo de Burgos Bengoetxea (Basque Country)

17 December 2017 16	Barcelona	4–0	Deportivo La Coruña	Barcelona
20:45 CET	L. Suárez 29', 47'; Paulinho 41', 75'	Report	Schär (yellow card) 32'	Stadium: Camp Nou; Attendance: 53,607; Referee: Mateu Lahoz (Valencian Community)

23 December 2017 17	Real Madrid	0–3	Barcelona	Madrid
13:00 CET	Ramos (yellow card) 59'; Carvajal (red card) 63'; Marcelo (yellow card) 83'	Report	Vermaelen (yellow card) 18'; L. Suárez 54'; Messi 64' (pen.); Busquets (yellow card) 88'; Vidal 90+3'	Stadium: Santiago Bernabéu; Attendance: 80,264; Referee: José María Sánchez Martínez (Region of Murcia)

7 January 2018 18	Barcelona	3–0	Levante	Barcelona
16:15 CET	Messi 12'; L. Suárez 38'; Paulinho 90+3'	Report	Lerma (yellow card) 8'; Postigo (yellow card) 31'; Boateng (yellow card) 70'; Róber (yellow card) 84'	Stadium: Camp Nou; Attendance: 56,380; Referee: Del Cerro Grande (Community of Madrid)

14 January 2018 19	Real Sociedad	2–4	Barcelona	San Sebastián
20:45 CET	Willian José 11'; Juanmi 34'; Illarramendi (yellow card) 63'; Oyarzabal (yellow card) 84'	Report	Paulinho 39'; L. Suárez 50', 71'; Roberto (yellow card) 60'; Messi 85'; Piqué (yellow card) 90+2'	Stadium: Anoeta; Attendance: 23,277; Referee: González González (Castile and León)

21 January 2018 20	Real Betis	0–5	Barcelona	Seville
20:45 CET	Durmisi (yellow card) 51'; Feddal (yellow card) 67'	Report	Gomes (yellow card) 21'; Rakitić 59'; Messi 64', 80'; K. Suárez (yellow card) 67', (goal) 69', 89'	Stadium: Benito Villamarín; Attendance: 53,426; Referee: Jaime Latre (Aragon)

28 January 2018 21	Barcelona	2–1	Alavés	Barcelona
20:45 CET	L. Suárez 72'; Messi 84'	Report	Wakaso (yellow card) 22'; Guidetti 23'; Duarte (yellow card) 27'	Stadium: Camp Nou; Attendance: 62,369; Referee: Iglesias Villanueva (Galicia)

4 February 2018 22	Espanyol	1–1	Barcelona	Cornellà de Llobregat
16:15 CET	Naldo (yellow card) 40'; Gerard 66', (yellow card) 84'; Navarro (yellow card) 70'; García (yellow card) 79'	Report	Busquets (yellow card) 29'; Umtiti (yellow card) 52'; Piqué 82'; Alba (yellow card) 86'	Stadium: RCDE Stadium; Attendance: 23,287; Referee: Gil Manzano (Extremadura)

11 February 2018 23	Barcelona	0–0	Getafe	Barcelona
16:15 CET	Busquets (yellow card) 54'; Mina (yellow card) 90+3'	Report	Arambarri (yellow card) 44'; Antunes (yellow card) 65'; Guaita (yellow card) 90+3'	Stadium: Camp Nou; Attendance: 75,681; Referee: Fernández Borbalán (Andalusia)

17 February 2018 24	Eibar	0–2	Barcelona	Eibar
16:15 CET	Orellana (yellow card) 58' (yellow-red card) 66'; Diop (yellow card) 66'	Report	L. Suárez 16'; Iniesta (yellow card) 48'; Alba 88'	Stadium: Ipurua; Attendance: 6,760; Referee: Hernández Hernández (Las Palmas)

24 February 2018 25	Barcelona	6–1	Girona	Barcelona
20:45 CET	L. Suárez 5', 44', 76'; Messi 30', 36'; Coutinho 66'; Alba (yellow card) 87'	Report	Portu 3'; Juanpe (yellow card) 62'	Stadium: Camp Nou; Attendance: 85,417; Referee: Alberola Rojas (Castilla-La Mancha)

1 March 2018 26	Las Palmas	1–1	Barcelona	Las Palmas
21:00 CET	Aguirregaray (yellow card) 5'; D. Castellano (yellow card) 10'; Navarro (yellow card) 20'; Calleri 48' (pen.), (yellow card) 90+4'; Etebo (yellow card) 66'; Gálvez (yellow card) 68'	Report	Messi 21'; Digne (yellow card) 24'; Roberto (yellow card) 41'; Umtiti (yellow card) 52'	Stadium: Gran Canaria; Attendance: 23,778; Referee: Mateu Lahoz (Valencian Community)

4 March 2018 27	Barcelona	1–0	Atlético Madrid	Barcelona
16:15 CET	Messi 26', (yellow card) 30'; Rakitić (yellow card) 69'	Report	Vrsaljko (yellow card) 31'; Giménez (yellow card) 57'	Stadium: Camp Nou; Attendance: 90,356; Referee: Gil Manzano (Extremadura)

10 March 2018 28	Málaga	0–2	Barcelona	Málaga
20:45 CET	Samu (red card) 30'; Iturra (yellow card) 49'	Report	L. Suárez 15', (yellow card) 84'; Coutinho 28'	Stadium: La Rosaleda; Attendance: 26,667; Referee: Juan Martínez Munuera (Valencia)

18 March 2018 29	Barcelona	2–0	Athletic Bilbao	Barcelona
16:15 CET	Alcácer 8'; Umtiti (yellow card) 17'; Messi 30'; Dembélé (yellow card) 39'	Report	García (yellow card) 31'; Lekue (yellow card) 40'	Stadium: Camp Nou; Attendance: 84,053; Referee: Jaime Latre (Aragon)

31 March 2018 30	Sevilla	2–2	Barcelona	Seville
20:45 CEST	Mercado (yellow card) 34'; Vázquez 36'; Rico (yellow card) 44'; Muriel 50'	Report	L. Suárez 88'; Messi 89'	Stadium: Ramón Sánchez Pizjuán; Attendance: 37,588; Referee: González González (Castile and León)

7 April 2018 31	Barcelona	3–1	Leganés	Barcelona
20:45 CEST	Messi 27', 32', 87'; Coutinho (yellow card) 78'; Alba (yellow card) 84'	Report	Siovas (yellow card) 51'; Gabriel (yellow card) 55'; El Zhar 68'; Pérez (yellow card) 76'; Zaldúa (yellow card) 79'	Stadium: Camp Nou; Attendance: 72,126; Referee: Ricardo de Burgos Bengoetxea (Basque Country)

14 April 2018 32	Barcelona	2–1	Valencia	Barcelona
16:15 CEST	Piqué (yellow card) 7'; L. Suárez 15'; Umtiti 51'; Dembélé (yellow card) 86'	Report	Kondogbia (yellow card) 12'; Gabriel (yellow card) 75'; Parejo 87' (pen.)	Stadium: Camp Nou; Attendance: 69,544; Referee: Del Cerro Grande (Community of Madrid)

17 April 2018 33	Celta Vigo	2–2	Barcelona	Vigo
21:00 CEST	Jonny 45', (yellow card) 88'; Aspas (yellow card) 56', (goal) 82'; Wass (yellow card) 78'	Report	Dembélé 36'; Alcácer 64'; Roberto (red card) 71'	Stadium: Balaídos; Attendance: 20,347; Referee: Fernández Borbalán (Andalusia)

29 April 2018 35	Deportivo La Coruña	2–4	Barcelona	A Coruña
20:45 CEST	Schär (yellow card) 20'; Pérez 40'; Çolak 64'	Report	Coutinho 7'; Messi 38', 82', 85'; Semedo (yellow card) 58'	Stadium: Riazor; Attendance: 25,721; Referee: Ricardo de Burgos Bengoetxea (Basque Country)

6 May 2018 36	Barcelona	2–2	Real Madrid	Barcelona
20:45 CEST	L. Suárez 10', (yellow card) 44'; Messi (yellow card) 45', (goal) 52'; Roberto (red card) 45+3'; Rakitić (yellow card) 85'	Report	Nacho (yellow card) 12'; Ronaldo 15'; Varane (yellow card) 31'; Ramos (yellow card) 44'; Bale 72', (yellow card) 76'; Marcelo (yellow card) 77'	Stadium: Camp Nou; Attendance: 97,939; Referee: Hernández Hernández (Las Palmas)

9 May 2018 34	Barcelona	5–1	Villarreal	Barcelona
20:00 CEST	Coutinho 11'; Paulinho 16'; Messi 45'; Dembélé 87', 90+3'	Report	Ruiz (yellow card) 44'; Sansone 54'; Fuego (yellow card) 72'; Mario Gaspar (yellow card) 82'	Stadium: Camp Nou; Attendance: 54,743; Referee: José María Sánchez Martínez (Region of Murcia)

13 May 2018 37	Levante	5–4	Barcelona	Valencia
20:45 CEST	Boateng 9', 30', 49', (yellow card) 37'; Bardhi (yellow card) 22', (goal) 46', 56'; Coke (yellow card) 62'; Campaña (yellow card) 70'; Lerma (yellow card) 88'; Pazzini (yellow card) 90+3'	Report	Vermaelen (yellow card) 20'; Coutinho 38', 59', 64'; Busquets (yellow card) 65'; L. Suárez 71' (pen.), (yellow card) 88'; D. Suárez (yellow card) 89'; Piqué (yellow card) 90+3'; Mina (yellow card) 90+4'	Stadium: Ciutat de València; Attendance: 22,384; Referee: Melero López (Andalusia)

20 May 2018 38	Barcelona	1–0	Real Sociedad	Barcelona
20:45 CEST	L. Suárez (yellow card) 43'; Coutinho 57'; Alba (yellow card) 72'; Rakitić (yellow card) 75'	Report	Navas (yellow card) 42'; Januzaj (yellow card) 53'	Stadium: Camp Nou; Attendance: 84,168; Referee: José Luis Munuera Montero

=== Copa del Rey ===
==== Round of 32 ====
24 October 2017 First leg	Real Murcia	0–3	Barcelona	Murcia
21:30 CEST	Mengoud (yellow card) 49'	Report	Alcácer 44'; Deulofeu 52'; Arnaiz 56'	Stadium: Nueva Condomina; Attendance: 16,127; Referee: José Luis Munuera Montero (Andalusia)

29 November 2017 Second leg	Barcelona	5–0 (8–0 agg.)	Real Murcia	Barcelona
19:30 CET	Alcácer 16'; Piqué 56'; Vidal 60'; D. Suárez 74'; Arnaiz 79'	Report		Stadium: Camp Nou; Attendance: 68,775; Referee: Alberola Rojas (Castilla-La Mancha)

==== Round of 16 ====
4 January 2018 First leg	Celta Vigo	1–1	Barcelona	Vigo
19:30 CET	Fontàs (yellow card) 26'; Sisto 31'	Report	Arnaiz 15'; Gomes (yellow card) 64'	Stadium: Balaídos; Attendance: 21,338; Referee: Juan Martínez Munuera (Valencia)

11 January 2018 Second leg	Barcelona	5–0 (6–1 agg.)	Celta Vigo	Barcelona
21:30 CET	Messi 13', 15'; Alba 28'; L. Suárez 31'; Rakitić 87'	Report		Stadium: Camp Nou; Attendance: 59,009; Referee: Hernández Hernández (Las Palmas)

==== Quarter-finals ====
17 January 2018 First leg	Espanyol	1–0	Barcelona	Cornellà de Llobregat
21:00 CET	Aarón (yellow card) 43'; Gerard (yellow card) 61'; V. Sánchez (yellow card) 86'; Melendo 88'; Da. López (yellow card) 90+1'	Report	Aleñá (yellow card) 45'; Alba (yellow card) 55'; Messi (penalty missed) 62'; Rakitić (yellow card) 82'; Vermaelen (yellow card) 84'; L. Suárez (yellow card) 90+1'	Stadium: RCDE Stadium; Attendance: 23,323; Referee: Ricardo de Burgos Bengoetxea (Basque Country)

25 January 2018 Second leg	Barcelona	2–0 (2–1 agg.)	Espanyol	Barcelona
21:30 CET	L. Suárez (yellow card) 8', (goal) 9'; Messi 25', (yellow card) 27'; Alba (yellow card) 38'; Paulinho (yellow card) 82'	Report	Hermoso (yellow card) 19'; Granero (yellow card) 60'; García (yellow card) 72'; Naldo (yellow card) 77'	Stadium: Camp Nou; Attendance: 79,774; Referee: Mateu Lahoz (Valencian Community)

==== Semi-finals ====
1 February 2018 First leg	Barcelona	1–0	Valencia	Barcelona
21:30 CET	Roberto (yellow card) 35'; L. Suárez 67'	Report	Pereira (yellow card) 40'; Vietto (yellow card) 51'; Soler (yellow card) 53'	Stadium: Camp Nou; Attendance: 50,959; Referee: José María Sánchez Martínez

8 February 2018 Second leg	Valencia	0–2 (0–3 agg.)	Barcelona	Valencia
21:30 CET	Rodrigo (yellow card) 34'; Zaza (yellow card) 75'; Parejo (yellow card) 90+1'	Report	Coutinho 49'; Rakitić 82'	Stadium: Mestalla; Attendance: 43,335; Referee: Undiano Mallenco (Navarre)

==== Final ====
21 April 2018 Final	Sevilla	0–5	Barcelona	Madrid
21:30 CEST	Mercado (yellow card) 34'; Escudero (yellow card) 38'; Vázquez (yellow card) 74'	Report	L. Suárez 14', 40'; Messi 31'; Iniesta 52', (yellow card) 67'; Coutinho 69' (pen.); Busquets (yellow card) 74'	Stadium: Wanda Metropolitano; Attendance: 67,500; Referee: Gil Manzano (Extremadura)

=== Supercopa de España ===
13 August 2017 First leg	Barcelona	1–3	Real Madrid	Barcelona
22:00 CEST	Piqué (yellow card) 27'; Messi (yellow card) 40', (goal) 77' (pen.); Busquets (yellow card) 57'	Report	Casemiro (yellow card) 19'; Bale (yellow card) 41'; Carvajal (yellow card) 41'; Piqué 50' (o.g.); Marcelo (yellow card) 76'; Ronaldo 80', (yellow card) 80' (yellow-red card) 82'; Asensio 90'	Stadium: Camp Nou; Attendance: 89,514; Referee: Ricardo de Burgos Bengoetxea (Basque Country)

16 August 2017 Second leg	Real Madrid	2–0 (5–1 agg.)	Barcelona	Madrid
23:00 CEST	Asensio 4'; Benzema 39'	Report	L. Suárez (yellow card) 89'; Mascherano (yellow card) 90+3'	Stadium: Santiago Bernabéu; Attendance: 75,167; Referee: José María Sánchez Martínez (Murcia)

=== UEFA Champions League ===
==== Group stage ====
Pos	Team	Pld	W	D	L	GF	GA	GD	Pts	Qualification	BAR	JUV	SPO	OLY
1	(Spain) Barcelona	6	4	2	0	9	1	+8	14	Advance to knockout phase	—	3–0	2–0	3–1
2	(Italy) Juventus	6	3	2	1	7	5	+2	11	Advance to knockout phase	0–0	—	2–1	2–0
3	(Portugal) Sporting CP	6	2	1	3	8	9	−1	7	Transfer to Europa League	0–1	1–1	—	3–1
4	(Greece) Olympiacos	6	0	1	5	4	13	−9	1		0–0	0–2	2–3	—

Source: UEFA
Rules for classification: Group stage tiebreakers

12 September 2017 1	Barcelona (Spain)	3–0	(Italy) Juventus	Barcelona, Spain
20:45 CEST	Semedo (yellow card) 35'; Messi 45', 69', (yellow card) 54'; Rakitić 56'	UEFA Report; Club Report	Bentancur (yellow card) 25'; Barzagli (yellow card) 61'; Pjanić (yellow card) 75'; Caligara (yellow card) 89'	Stadium: Camp Nou; Attendance: 78,656; Referee: Damir Skomina (Slovenia)

27 September 2017 2	Sporting CP (Portugal)	0–1	(Spain) Barcelona	Lisbon, Portugal
20:45 CEST	Martins (yellow card) 6'; Coentrão (yellow card) 26'; Doumbia (yellow card) 40'; Acuña (yellow card) 48'; Piccini (yellow card) 53'; Coates (yellow card) 58'	UEFA Report; Club Report	Coates 49' (o.g.); Semedo (yellow card) 69'; Vidal (yellow card) 90+2'	Stadium: Estádio José Alvalade; Attendance: 48,575; Referee: Ovidiu Hațegan (Romania)

18 October 2017 3	Barcelona (Spain)	3–1	(Greece) Olympiacos	Barcelona, Spain
20:45 CEST	Piqué (yellow card) 11' (yellow-red card) 42'; Nikolaou 18' (o.g.); Messi 61'; Digne 64'	UEFA Report; Club Report	Romao (yellow card) 30'; Nikolaou (yellow card) 60', (goal) 90'; Elabdellaoui (yellow card) 90+1'	Stadium: Camp Nou; Attendance: 55,026; Referee: William Collum (Scotland)

31 October 2017 4	Olympiacos (Greece)	0–0	(Spain) Barcelona	Piraeus, Greece
19:45 EET	Tachtsidis (yellow card) 36'; Engels (yellow card) 58'; Figueiras (yellow card) 88'	UEFA Report; Club Report	Roberto (yellow card) 42'; Gomes (yellow card) 77'	Stadium: Karaiskakis Stadium; Attendance: 31,600; Referee: Anthony Taylor (England)

22 November 2017 5	Juventus (Italy)	0–0	(Spain) Barcelona	Turin, Italy
20:45 CET	Pjanić (yellow card) 21'; Alex Sandro (yellow card) 72'	UEFA Report; Club Report	Paulinho (yellow card) 30'; Digne (yellow card) 87'; Piqué (yellow card) 90+1'	Stadium: Allianz Stadium; Attendance: 40,876; Referee: Milorad Mažić (Serbia)

5 December 2017 6	Barcelona (Spain)	2–0	(Portugal) Sporting CP	Barcelona, Spain
20:45 CET	Semedo (yellow card) 35'; Alcácer 59'; Mathieu 90+1' (o.g.)	UEFA Report; Club Report	A. Ruiz (yellow card) 30'	Stadium: Camp Nou; Attendance: 48,336; Referee: Craig Thomson (Scotland)

==== Knockout phase ====
===== Round of 16 =====
20 February 2018 First leg	Chelsea (England)	1–1	(Spain) Barcelona	London, England
19:45 GMT	Willian 62'; Rüdiger (yellow card) 80'; Morata (yellow card) 86'	UEFA Report; Club Report	Rakitić (yellow card) 29'; Messi 75'; L. Suárez (yellow card) 76'; Busquets (yellow card) 90'	Stadium: Stamford Bridge; Attendance: 37,741; Referee: Cüneyt Çakır (Turkey)

14 March 2018 Second leg	Barcelona (Spain)	3–0 (4–1 agg.)	(England) Chelsea	Barcelona, Spain
20:45 CET	Messi 3', 63'; Dembélé 20'; Roberto (yellow card) 22'	UEFA Report; Club Report	Willian (yellow card) 45'; Giroud (yellow card) 49'; Alonso (yellow card) 75'	Stadium: Camp Nou; Attendance: 97,183; Referee: Damir Skomina (Slovenia)

===== Quarter-finals =====
4 April 2018 First leg	Barcelona (Spain)	4–1	(Italy) Roma	Barcelona, Spain
20:45 CEST	De Rossi 38' (o.g.); Manolas 55' (o.g.); Piqué 59'; L. Suárez 87'	UEFA Report; Club Report	Kolarov (yellow card) 44'; Džeko 80'; Strootman (yellow card) 88'	Stadium: Camp Nou; Attendance: 90,106; Referee: Danny Makkelie (Netherlands)

10 April 2018 Second leg	Roma (Italy)	3–0 (4 (a) –4 agg.)	(Spain) Barcelona	Rome, Italy
20:45 CEST	Džeko 6'; Fazio (yellow card) 38'; Juan Jesus (yellow card) 44'; De Rossi 58' (pen.); Manolas 82'	UEFA Report; Club Report	Piqué (yellow card) 57'; Messi (yellow card) 62'; L. Suárez (yellow card) 72'	Stadium: Stadio Olimpico; Attendance: 56,580; Referee: Clément Turpin (France)
