= Denis Suárez =

Spanish footballer (born 1994)

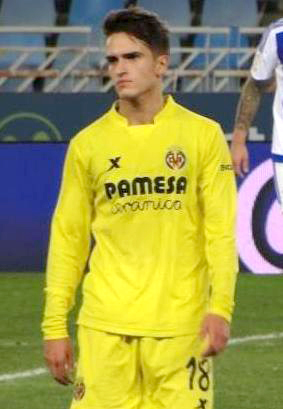
- Suárez with Villarreal in 2015

Personal information
- Full name: Denis Suárez Fernández
- Date of birth: 6 January 1994 (age 32)
- Place of birth: Salceda de Caselas, Spain
- Height: 1.78 m (5 ft 10 in)
- Position: Midfielder

Team information
- Current team: Alavés
- Number: 4

Youth career
- 2008–2009: Porriño Industrial
- 2009–2010: Celta
- 2011–2013: Manchester City

Senior career*
Years	Team	Apps	(Gls)
2010–2011	Celta B	15	(0)
2011–2013	Manchester City	0	(0)
2013–2015	Barcelona B	36	(7)
2014–2015	→ Sevilla (loan)	31	(2)
2015–2016	Villarreal	33	(4)
2016–2019	Barcelona	46	(3)
2019	→ Arsenal (loan)	4	(0)
2019–2023	Celta	99	(5)
2023	→ Espanyol (loan)	18	(0)
2023–2025	Villarreal	25	(1)
2025–	Alavés	30	(1)

International career
2014–2017	Spain U21	21	(4)
2016	Spain	1	(0)
2016	Galicia	1	(2)
- * Club domestic league appearances and goals as of 27 May 2026

Denis Suárez Fernández (Spanish pronunciation: [ˈdenis ˈswaɾeθ feɾˈnandeθ]; born 6 January 1994) is a Spanish professional footballer who plays as a midfielder for La Liga club Alavés.

== Club career ==
=== Early years ===
Born in Salceda de Caselas, Pontevedra, Galicia, Suárez played youth football in his home country for Porriño Industrial and Celta Vigo.

=== Manchester City ===
Suárez signed for English club Manchester City on 23 May 2011. Manchester City beat off interest from Barcelona, Chelsea and rivals Manchester United signing him for an initial fee of £900,000.

Suárez played in the 2011–12 pre-season friendly match against LA Galaxy, replacing Edin Džeko in 88th minute. He also converted a penalty in the penalty shootout in the same game. He was an unused substitute in the League Cup game against Birmingham City. In the next round of the League Cup, he made his competitive debut for the club when he replaced Samir Nasri in the 67th minute in the 5–2 win against Wolverhampton Wanderers. On 17 May 2012, Suárez starred for Manchester City reserves against Manchester United reserves in Manchester Senior Cup, although Manchester City lost 0–2. In 2012, he was awarded Manchester City's Young Player of the Year as voted for by the fans.

=== Barcelona ===
On 22 August 2013, Suárez returned to Spain and completed a transfer to Barcelona for an undisclosed fee, signing a four-year contract. During the 2013–14 season he played mostly for Barcelona B in the Spanish Segunda División to continue his development.

==== Sevilla (loan) ====
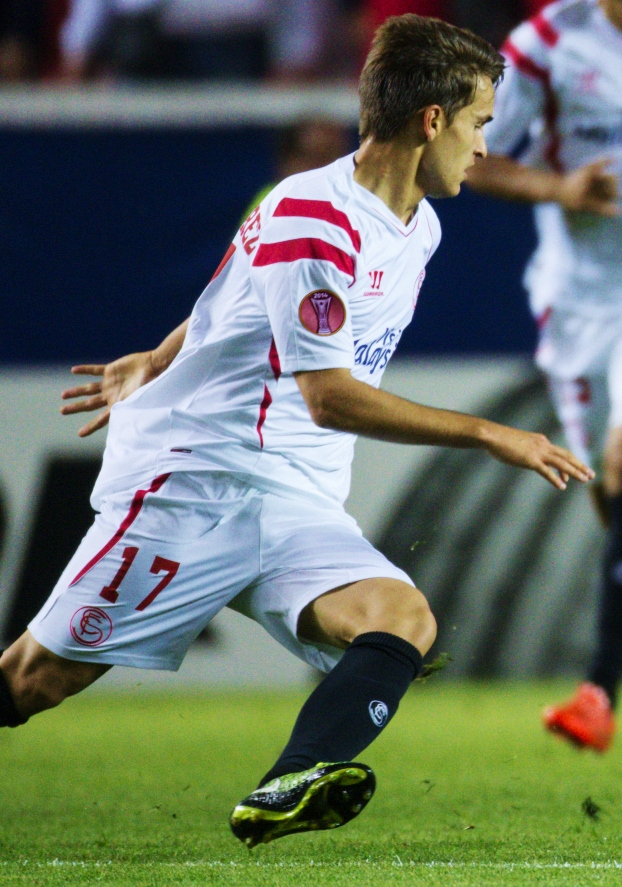
Suárez playing for Sevilla in April 2015

In July 2014, Suárez was loaned to Sevilla on a two-season long deal as part of a swap deal which saw Ivan Rakitić move to Barcelona. He made his competitive debut on 12 August in the 2014 UEFA Super Cup at Cardiff City Stadium, playing 78 minutes before being substituted for José Antonio Reyes in the 0–2 defeat to Real Madrid. On 11 December, he scored the only goal of Sevilla's final Europa League group match against HNK Rijeka, sending the club through at the expense of Rijeka.

=== Villarreal ===
On 29 August 2015, Suárez completed a transfer to Villarreal for an undisclosed fee, signing a four-year contract which includes a buy back clause.

=== Return to Barcelona ===
On 4 July 2016, Barcelona announced the return of Suárez after exercising the buy back clause. Barcelona paid €3.5 million and Suárez signed a four-year contract, with an option of a further year depending on the number of appearances. In his first season, Suárez managed only 12 La Liga starts.

==== Arsenal (loan) ====
On 30 January 2019, Suárez returned to England temporarily, joining Premier League side Arsenal on loan until the end of the 2018–19 season.

=== Celta Vigo ===
On 30 June 2019, Suárez again returned to Spain, signing a four-year deal to return to Celta Vigo, for a €16 million fee.

At the start of the 2022–23 season, after falling out with the club's president, Carlos Mouriño, Suárez was excluded from the first team for the rest of the campaign. Subsequently, he would later be loaned out to Espanyol in January 2023.

==== Espanyol (loan) ====
On 30 January 2023, Suárez joined fellow top tier club Espanyol on loan until the end of the season, with Celta being set to receive a €200.000 fee for the immediate transfer, plus an equal fee in the case Espanyol successfully avoided relegation.

=== Villarreal return ===
On 27 June 2023, after Espanyol's relegation, and his exclusion from Celta Vigo's squad, Suárez returned to Villarreal, signing on a three-year deal.

On 29 August 2025, Villarreal terminated Suárez's contract by mutual agreement.

=== Deportivo Alavés ===
Hours after leaving Villarreal, it was announced that Suárez had joined fellow La Liga side Deportivo Alavés on a two-year contract until 2027. He made his debut for the club three days later on 30 August, coming on as a substitute in a 1–1 draw against Atlético Madrid.

== International career ==
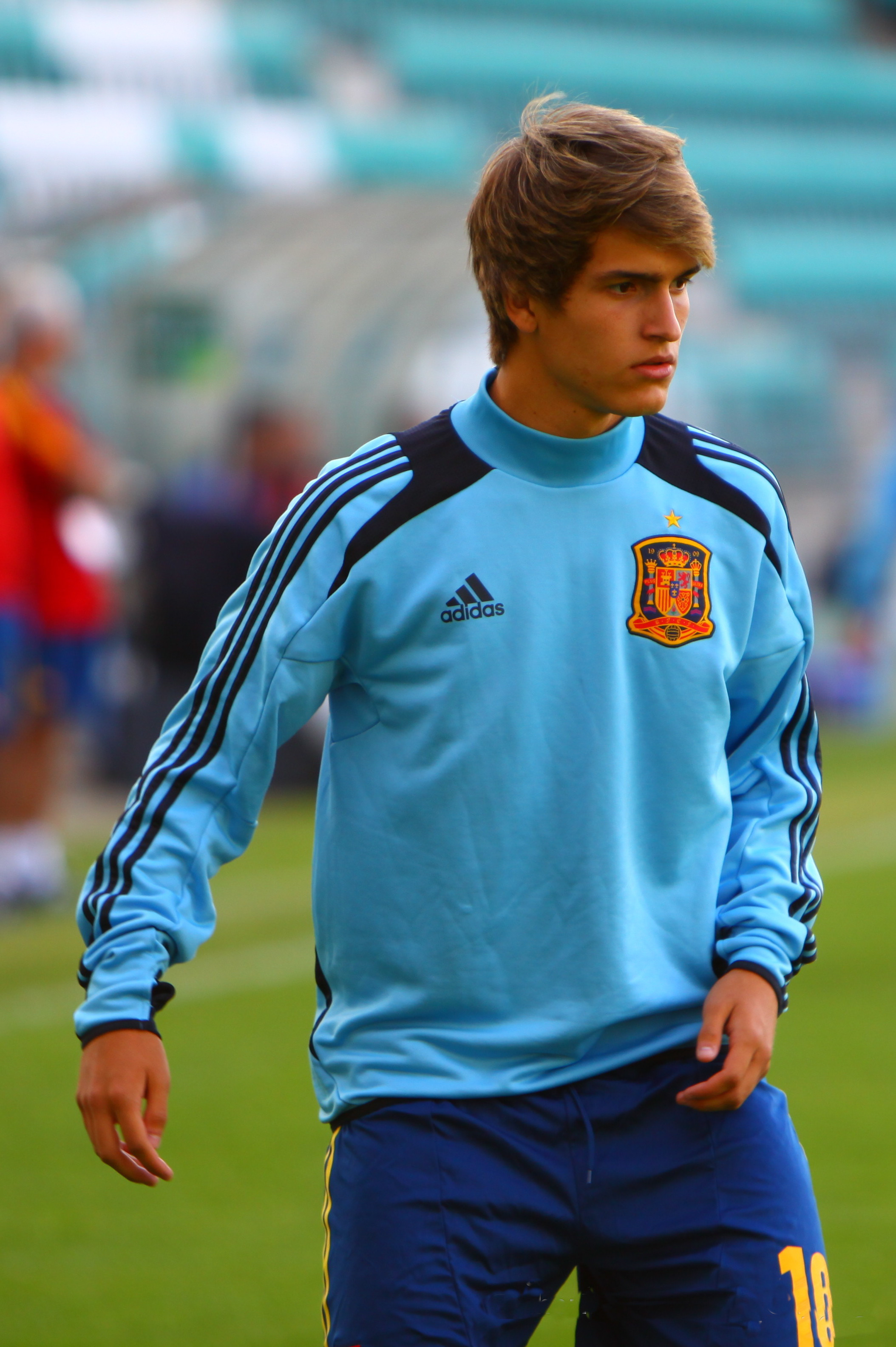
Suárez training with Spain's U-19 team in 2012

Suárez has been capped by Spain U17 and has scored two goals for the team, against Moldova and Northern Ireland. He was also a member of the Spain U19 which won the 2012 Under-19 European Championship. Suárez was a 71st-minute substitute in the final against Greece and made six appearances at the Championships, scoring twice and playing 284 minutes.

On 29 May 2016, he made his senior debut coming on as second-half substitute for midfielder David Silva in a friendly match against Bosnia and Herzegovina. A week earlier on 20 May, he had represented Galicia in the region's first match for eight years, a 1–1 draw with Venezuela.

== Career statistics ==
=== Club ===
As of match played 23 May 2026

Appearances and goals by club, season and competition
Club	Season	League			National cup (Note: Includes FA Cup and Copa del Rey)		League cup		Europe		Other		Total	
Club	Season	Division	Apps	Goals	Apps	Goals	Apps	Goals	Apps	Goals	Apps	Goals	Apps	Goals
Celta Vigo B	2009–10	Segunda División B	4	0	—		—		—		—		4	0
Celta Vigo B	2010–11	Segunda División B	11	0	—		—		—		—		11	0
Celta Vigo B	Total		15	0	—		—		—		—		15	0
Manchester City	2011–12	Premier League	0	0	0	0	1	0	0	0	0	0	1	0
Manchester City	2012–13	Premier League	0	0	0	0	1	0	0	0	0	0	1	0
Manchester City	Total		0	0	0	0	2	0	0	0	0	0	2	0
Barcelona B	2013–14	Segunda División	36	7	—		—		—		—		36	7
Sevilla (loan)	2014–15	La Liga	31	2	5	1	—		9 (Note: Appearance(s) in UEFA Europa League)	3	1 (Note: Appearance in UEFA Super Cup)	0	46	6
Villarreal	2015–16	La Liga	33	4	2	0	—		13	1	—		48	5
Barcelona	2016–17	La Liga	26	1	7	2	—		1 (Note: Appearance(s) in UEFA Champions League)	0	2 (Note: Appearance(s) in Supercopa de España)	0	36	3
Barcelona	2017–18	La Liga	18	2	5	1	—		3	0	1	0	27	3
Barcelona	2018–19	La Liga	2	0	4	2	—		2	0	0	0	8	2
Barcelona	Total		46	3	16	5	—		6	0	3	0	71	8
Arsenal (loan)	2018–19	Premier League	4	0	0	0	0	0	2	0	—		6	0
Celta Vigo	2019–20	La Liga	26	1	2	0	—		—		—		28	1
Celta Vigo	2020–21	La Liga	35	0	2	0	—		—		—		37	0
Celta Vigo	2021–22	La Liga	38	4	2	0	—		—		—		40	4
Celta Vigo	Total		99	5	6	0	—		—		—		105	5
Espanyol	2022–23	La Liga	18	0	—		—		—		—		18	0
Villarreal	2023–24	La Liga	4	0	0	0	—		1	0	—		5	0
Villarreal	2024–25	La Liga	21	1	1	0	—		—		—		22	1
Villarreal	Total		25	1	1	0	—		1	0	—		27	1
Alavés	2025–26	La Liga	30	1	2	0	—		—		—		32	1
Career total			337	23	32	6	2	0	31	4	4	0	406	33

== Honours ==
=== Club ===
Sevilla

- UEFA Europa League: 2014–15

Barcelona

- La Liga: 2017–18, 2018–19
- Copa del Rey: 2016–17, 2017–18
- Supercopa de España: 2016

=== International ===
Spain U19

- UEFA European Under-19 Championship: 2012

Spain U21

- UEFA European Under-21 Championship runner-up: 2017

=== Individual ===
- Manchester City's Young Player of the Year: 2011–12
- UEFA Europa League Top assist provider: 2015–16
