= 2020–21 Real Madrid CF season =

117th season in existence of Real Madrid CF

Real Madrid
2020–21 season
- President: Florentino Pérez
- Head coach: Zinedine Zidane
- Stadium: Alfredo Di Stéfano
- La Liga: 2nd
- Copa del Rey: Round of 32
- Supercopa de España: Semi-finals
- UEFA Champions League: Semi-finals
- Top goalscorer: League: Karim Benzema (23); All: Karim Benzema (30)
- Average home league attendance: 0 (Note: All matches were played behind closed doors due to the COVID-19 pandemic.)
- Biggest win: Real Madrid 4–1 Huesca; Alavés 1–4 Real Madrid; Cádiz 0–3 Real Madrid; Granada 1–4 Real Madrid
- Biggest defeat: Valencia 4–1 Real Madrid
Home colours	Away colours	Third colours

The 2020–21 Real Madrid Club de Fútbol season was the club's 117th season in existence and the 90th consecutive season in the top flight of Spanish football. In addition to the domestic league, Real Madrid participated in this season's editions of the Copa del Rey, the Supercopa de España, and the UEFA Champions League. The season covered the period from 8 August 2020 to 30 June 2021.

Real Madrid played the entire season at the Alfredo Di Stéfano Stadium, while the Santiago Bernabéu was undergoing a structural renovation.

Despite finishing a close second in the league and advancing to the Champions League semi-finals for the first time since 2018, Real Madrid went trophyless for the first time since the 2009–10 season.

This was the first season since 2013–14 without the Colombian midfielder James Rodriguez, who departed for Everton, and the first since the 2012–13 not to feature Gareth Bale, who was loaned to his previous club Tottenham Hotspur, thus returning to Los Merengues in the following campaign.

== Summary ==
=== September ===
The first league match of the season, on 20 September, ended in a goalless draw at Real Sociedad. On 26 September, Real secured their first win of the season by defeating Real Betis 3–2 away from home, with goals from Federico Valverde, Sergio Ramos and an own goal. Four days later, a Vinícius Júnior goal clinched the three points against Real Valladolid in the first home game of the season.

=== October ===
On 4 October, goals from Vinícius and Karim Benzema got Madrid another three points in a 2–0 away victory against Levante. After the international break, Madrid lost a home game to Cádiz 0–1 on 17 October. Four days later, Madrid fell 2–3 to Shakhrtar Donetsk in their opening Champions League match, despite second half goals from Modrić and Vinícius after being down 0–3. The first El Clásico of the season was played on 24 October, with Madrid winning 3–1 at Camp Nou. Valverde, Ramos and Modrić scored the goals. Three days later, Benzema and Casemiro scored two late goals to give Real a 2–2 draw in the Champions League at Borussia Mönchengladbach. On the last day of October, a brace from Benzema and goals from Valverde and Eden Hazard secured a 4–1 home win over Huesca.

=== November ===
The new month kicked off with a 3–2 home win against Inter Milan in the Champions League on 3 November. The goalscorers were Benzema, Ramos and Rodrygo. Five days later, despite an opening goal from Benzema, Madrid lost 1–4 to Valencia away from home, while giving up three penalties and an own goal. On 21 November, after the second international break, Real came away with a 1–1 draw at Villarreal, despite getting an early lead after a goal from Mariano. Four days later, an early penalty from Hazard and an own goal secured three points in the away Champions League match against Inter. The home match against Deportivo Alavés was lost 1–2 on 28 November, with Casemiro scoring the lone goal.

=== December ===
On the first day of the new month, Madrid once again lost to Donetsk in the Champions League, this time 0–2 on the road. Four days later, Sevilla was defeated 1–0 at the Ramón Sánchez Pizjuán, thanks to an own goal. On 9 December, Madrid defeated Borussia Mönchengladbach in the Champions League 2–0 at home, with Benzema scoring both goals. With the win, Madrid topped Group B and advanced to the knockout stage. Three days later, a Casemiro goal and an own goal gave Real a 2–0 home victory over Atlético Madrid. On 15 December, a brace from Benzema and a goal from Toni Kroos saw Madrid get away with another home win, this time defeating Athletic Bilbao 3–1. Goals from Benzema, Modrić and Vázquez helped Madrid to a 3–1 away win over Eibar, moving the team to second place. On 23 December, Real Madrid secured a 2–0 home win against Granada, with Casemiro and Benzema on the scoresheet. A week later, in the last game of 2020, a Modrić goal was not enough as Madrid drew Elche 1–1 away from home to finish the year in second place.

=== January ===
Real started the new year with a 2–0 win over Celta Vigo at the Alfredo Di Stéfano on 2 January. The goals were scored by Vázquez and Marco Asensio. A week later, the match at Osasuna ended in a goalless draw. On 14 January, Madrid lost the semi-final of the 2020–21 Supercopa de España against Athletic Bilbao 1–2, with a second half goal from Benzema not being enough. Real was knocked out of the 2020–21 Copa del Rey in the round of 32 exactly six days later, after losing 1–2 (a.e.t.) at Alcoyano, where Éder Militão initially gave Madrid the lead. On 23 January, Real defeated Alavés 4–1 on the road, with a brace from Benzema and goals from Casemiro and Hazard. A week later, ten-man Madrid lost the home match against Levante 1–2, even though Asensio gave Real an early lead.

=== February ===
A brace from Raphaël Varane helped produce a 2–1 come-from-behind win at Huesca on 6 February. Three days later, Madrid hosted Getafe and won 2–0 after goals from Benzema and Ferland Mendy. On 14 February, goals from Benzema and Kroos secured another three points in a 2–0 home win against Valencia. Six days later, a second-half Casemiro goal helped Madrid to a 1–0 win over Valladolid at the José Zorrilla. On 24 February, Atalanta was defeated 1–0 in Bergamo, thanks to a goal from Mendy, in the first leg of the Champions League round of 16.

=== March ===
On the first day of the new month, the home game against Sociedad ended in a 1–1 draw, with the goal coming from Vinícius in the closing minutes. In a derby against Atlético at the Wanda Metropolitano on 7 March, Benzema scored a late equalizer with the same result, securing Madrid a point. Six days later, a brace from Benzema gave Madrid a 2–1 come-from-behind victory over Elche at the Di Stéfano. On 16 March, Madrid secured their qualification for the quarter-finals of the Champions League with a 3–1 home win over Atalanta. The goals were scored by Benzema, Ramos and Asensio. Four days later, a brace from Benzema and a goal from Asensio saw Madrid win 3–1 at Celta Vigo.

=== April ===
On 3 April, Real defeated Eibar 2–0 at home with goals from Asensio and Benzema. Three days later, Madrid defeated Liverpool 3–1 at the Di Stéfano in the crucial first leg of the Champions League quarter-finals. Vinícius scored a brace, with another goal coming from Asensio. The season's second El Clásico was won 2–1 on 10 April with goals from Benzema and Kroos. Four days later, the return leg against Liverpool ended 0–0, meaning Madrid qualified for the Champions League semi-finals. On 18 April, Real were held to a goalless draw at Getafe. Three days later, a brace from Benzema and a goal from Álvaro Odriozola gave Madrid a 3–0 away victory over Cádiz. The crucial home match against Betis on 24 April 2021 ended in a 0–0 draw, damaging Real's title aspirations. Three days later, a Benzema goal secured a 1–1 home draw against Chelsea in the first leg of the Champions League semi-finals.

=== May ===
On 1 May, Militao and Casemiro scored late to help Madrid post a 2–0 home win versus Osasuna. Four days later, Real's Champions League campaign came to an end at the semi-final stage after a 0–2 away loss to Chelsea. Another four days later, an Asensio goal and a late deflection from Hazard helped Madrid salvage a point in the home game against Sevilla, keeping them alive in the title race. The away match against Granada on 13 May was won 4–1, with goals coming from Modrić, Rodrygo, Odriozola and Benzema. Three days later, a goal from Nacho secured Madrid a 1–0 win at Athletic Bilbao. With that win, Real stayed in second position, two points behind leaders Atlético Madrid, with one match to go. On 22 May, Madrid produced a late comeback to defeat Villarreal 2–1 at home in the last match of the season, with Benzema and Modrić scoring the goals. Since Atlético also won their game, Real finished second in the standings. This marked the club's first trophyless season since 2009–10.

== Players ==
N	Pos.	Nat.	Name	Age	EU	Since	App	Goals	Ends	Transfer fee	Notes
1	GK	(Belgium)	Thibaut Courtois	29	EU	2018	129	0	2025	€35M	
2	DF	(Spain)	Dani Carvajal	29	EU	2013	294	6	2022	€6.5M	Originally from youth system
3	DF	(Brazil)	Éder Militão	23	Non-EU	2019	41	2	2025	€50M	
4	DF	(Spain)	Sergio Ramos (captain)	35	EU	2005	671	101	2021	€27M	
5	DF	(France)	Raphaël Varane (3rd VC)	28	EU	2011	360	17	2022	€10M	
6	DF	(Spain)	Nacho	31	EU	2012	233	12	2022	Youth system	
7	FW	(Belgium)	Eden Hazard	30	EU	2019	42	5	2024	€115M	
8	MF	(Germany)	Toni Kroos	31	EU	2014	320	22	2023	€25M	
9	FW	(France)	Karim Benzema (2nd VC)	33	EU	2009	559	279	2022	€35M	
10	MF	(Croatia)	Luka Modrić	35	EU	2012	391	28	2022	€35M	
11	FW	(Spain)	Marco Asensio	25	EU	2014	193	36	2023	€3.5M	
12	DF	(Brazil)	Marcelo (VC)	33	EU	2007 (Winter)	528	38	2022	€6.5M	Second nationality: Spain
13	GK	(Ukraine)	Andriy Lunin	22	Non-EU	2018	1	0	2024	€8.5M	
14	MF	(Brazil)	Casemiro	29	EU	2013	286	30	2023	€6M	Second nationality: Spain
15	MF	(Uruguay)	Federico Valverde	22	EU	2016	102	5	2025	€5M	Second nationality: Spain
17	FW	(Spain)	Lucas Vázquez	29	EU	2015	240	25	2021	€1M	Originally from youth system
19	DF	(Spain)	Álvaro Odriozola	25	EU	2018	43	3	2024	€30M	
20	FW	(Brazil)	Vinícius Júnior	20	EU	2018	118	15	2025	€45M	Second nationality: Spain
22	MF	(Spain)	Isco	29	EU	2013	336	51	2022	€30M	
23	DF	(France)	Ferland Mendy	26	EU	2019	70	3	2025	€48M	
24	FW	(Dominican Republic)	Mariano	27	EU	2018	62	11	2023	€23M	Originally from youth system
25	FW	(Brazil)	Rodrygo	20	Non-EU	2019	58	9	2025	€45M	

- Source: realmadrid.com
- Ordered by squad number.

== Transfers ==
=== In ===
Date	Pos.	Name	From	Type	Ref.
1 July 2020	GK	(Spain) Moha Ramos	(England) Birmingham City	End of loan	
1 July 2020	DF	(Morocco) Achraf Hakimi	(Germany) Borussia Dortmund	End of loan	
1 July 2020	DF	(Spain) Javi Sánchez	Valladolid	End of loan	
1 July 2020	GK	(France) Luca Zidane	Racing Santander	End of loan	
19 July 2020	GK	(Ukraine) Andriy Lunin	Real Oviedo	End of loan	
19 July 2020	DF	(Spain) Jesús Vallejo	Granada	End of loan	
19 July 2020	MF	(Spain) Alberto Fernández	Fuenlabrada	End of loan	
19 July 2020	MF	(Japan) Takefusa Kubo	Mallorca	End of loan	
19 July 2020	MF	(Norway) Martin Ødegaard	Real Sociedad	End of loan	
19 July 2020	MF	(Spain) Óscar Rodríguez	Leganés	End of loan	
19 July 2020	MF	(Spain) Alberto Soro	Zaragoza	End of loan	
19 July 2020	FW	(Spain) Jorge de Frutos	Rayo Vallecano	End of loan	
19 July 2020	FW	(Spain) Dani Gómez	Tenerife	End of loan	
19 July 2020	FW	(Spain) Borja Mayoral	Levante	End of loan	
19 July 2020	FW	(Spain) Hugo Vallejo	Deportivo La Coruña	End of loan	
2 August 2020	MF	(Spain) Dani Ceballos	(England) Arsenal	End of loan	
31 August 2020	DF	(Spain) Álvaro Odriozola	(Germany) Bayern Munich	End of loan	
31 August 2020	DF	(Spain) Sergio Reguilón	Sevilla	End of loan	
8 January 2021	MF	(Japan) Takefusa Kubo	Villarreal	End of loan	

=== Out ===
Date	Pos.	Name	To	Type	Ref.
1 July 2020	DF	(Spain) Javi Sánchez	Valladolid	Transfer	
2 July 2020	DF	(Morocco) Achraf Hakimi	(Italy) Inter Milan	Transfer	
29 July 2020	MF	(Spain) Jorge de Frutos	Levante	Transfer	
31 July 2020	FW	(Spain) Dani Gómez	Levante	Transfer	
10 August 2020	MF	(Japan) Takefusa Kubo	Villarreal	Loan	
11 August 2020	GK	(France) Alphonse Areola	(France) Paris Saint-Germain	End of loan	
15 August 2020	MF	(Spain) Miguel Baeza	Celta Vigo	Transfer	
18 August 2020	DF	(Spain) Jesús Vallejo	Granada	Loan	
19 August 2020	MF	(Brazil) Reinier	(Germany) Borussia Dortmund	Loan	
29 August 2020	MF	(Spain) Óscar Rodríguez	Sevilla	Transfer	
1 September 2020	MF	(Spain) Alberto Soro	Granada	Transfer	
4 September 2020	MF	(Spain) Brahim Díaz	(Italy) Milan	Loan	
4 September 2020	MF	(Spain) Dani Ceballos	(England) Arsenal	Loan	
7 September 2020	MF	(Colombia) James Rodríguez	(England) Everton	Transfer	
19 September 2020	DF	(Spain) Sergio Reguilón	(England) Tottenham Hotspur	Transfer	
19 September 2020	FW	(Wales) Gareth Bale	(England) Tottenham Hotspur	Loan	
2 October 2020	FW	(Spain) Borja Mayoral	(Italy) Roma	Loan	
5 October 2020	GK	(France) Luca Zidane	Rayo Vallecano	End of contract	
8 January 2021	MF	(Japan) Takefusa Kubo	Getafe	Loan	
14 January 2021	FW	(Serbia) Luka Jović	(Germany) Eintracht Frankfurt	Loan	
27 January 2021	MF	(Norway) Martin Ødegaard	(England) Arsenal	Loan	

=== New contracts ===
Date	Pos.	Name	Contract length	Contract end	Ref.
25 May 2021	MF	Luka Modrić	1-year	2022	
3 June 2021	FW	Lucas Vázquez	3-year	2024	

== Pre-season and friendlies ==
Win Draw Loss

9 September 2020 1	Real Madrid	Cancelled	Rayo Vallecano	Madrid
21:00 CEST (UTC+2)				Stadium: Alfredo Di Stéfano Stadium
Note: The match was cancelled due to a not-conclusive COVID-19 test from a Rayo Vallecano player.

15 September 2020 2	Real Madrid	6–0	Getafe	Madrid
12:00 CEST (UTC+2)	Benzema; Ramos; Arribas			Stadium: Alfredo Di Stéfano Stadium; Attendance: 0
Note: The match was played behind closed doors.

== Competitions ==
=== Overview ===
Competition	First match	Last match	Starting round	Final position	Record							
Competition	First match	Last match	Starting round	Final position	Pld	W	D	L	GF	GA	GD	Win %
La Liga	20 September 2020	22 May 2021	Matchday 1	Runners-up	38	25	9	4	67	28	+39	65.79
Copa del Rey	20 January 2021		Round of 32	Round of 32	1	0	0	1	1	2	−1	0.00
Supercopa de España	14 January 2021		Semi-finals	Semi-finals	1	0	0	1	1	2	−1	0.00
Champions League	21 October 2020	5 May 2021	Group stage	Semi-finals	12	6	3	3	19	14	+5	50.00
Total					52	31	12	9	88	46	+42	59.62

Source: Soccerway

=== La Liga ===
==== League table ====
Pos	Team	Pld	W	D	L	GF	GA	GD	Pts	Qualification or relegation
1	Atlético Madrid (C)	38	26	8	4	67	25	+42	86	Qualification for the Champions League group stage
2	Real Madrid	38	25	9	4	67	28	+39	84	Qualification for the Champions League group stage
3	Barcelona	38	24	7	7	85	38	+47	79	Qualification for the Champions League group stage
4	Sevilla	38	24	5	9	53	33	+20	77	Qualification for the Champions League group stage
5	Real Sociedad	38	17	11	10	59	38	+21	62	Qualification for the Europa League group stage (Note: Since the winners of the 2020–21 Copa del Rey, Barcelona, qualified for the 2021–22 UEFA Champions League based on league position, the spot awarded to the cup winners (Europa League group stage) was passed to the sixth-placed team, and the spot awarded to the sixth-placed team (2021–22 UEFA Europa Conference League play-off round) was passed to the seventh-placed team, Villarreal.)

Source: La Liga
Rules for classification: 1) Points; 2) Head-to-head points; 3) Head-to-head goal difference; 4) Goal difference; 5) Goals scored; 6) Fair-play points (Note: Head-to-head record is used only after all the matches between the teams in question have been played)
(C) Champions

==== Results summary ====
Overall								Home						Away					
Pld	W	D	L	GF	GA	GD	Pts	W	D	L	GF	GA	GD	W	D	L	GF	GA	GD
38	25	9	4	67	28	+39	84	13	3	3	33	13	+20	12	6	1	34	15	+19

Source: La Liga

==== Results by round ====
Round	1	2	3	4	5	6	7	8	9	10	11	12	13	14	15	16	17	18	19	20	21	22	23	24	25	26	27	28	29	30	31	32	33	34	35	36	37	38
Ground	A	A	H	A	H	A	H	A	A	H	A	H	H	A	H	A	H	A	A	H	A	H	H	A	H	A	H	A	H	H	A	A	H	H	H	A	A	H
Result	D	W	W	W	L	W	W	L	D	L	W	W	W	W	W	D	W	D	W	L	W	W	W	W	D	D	W	W	W	W	D	W	D	W	D	W	W	W
Position	10	6	3	1	3	2	2	4	4	4	4	3	3	2	2	2	2	2	2	3	3	2	2	2	3	3	3	3	3	2	2	2	2	2	2	2	2	2

Source: La Liga
A = Away; H = Home; W = Win; D = Draw; L = Loss

==== Matches ====
The league fixtures were announced on 31 August 2020.

20 September 2020 1	Real Sociedad	0–0	Real Madrid	San Sebastián
21:00 CEST (UTC+2)	Barrenetxea (yellow card) 24'; Muñoz (yellow card) 33'	Report	Mendy (yellow card) 29'; Carvajal (yellow card) 83'	Stadium: Reale Arena; Attendance: 0 (Note: The match was played behind closed doors due to the COVID-19 pandemic in Spain.); Referee: Juan Martínez Munuera

26 September 2020 2	Real Betis	2–3	Real Madrid	Seville
21:00 CEST (UTC+2)	Emerson (yellow card) 12', (red card) 67'; Mandi 35', (yellow card) 90+1'; Carvalho 37'; Rodríguez (yellow card) 40'; Bartra (yellow card) 81'	Report	Valverde 13'; Carvajal (yellow card) 42'; Emerson 48' (o.g.); Modrić (yellow card) 53'; Ramos 82' (pen.)	Stadium: Benito Villamarín; Attendance: 0 Referee: Ricardo de Burgos Bengoetxea

30 September 2020 3	Real Madrid	1–0	Valladolid	Madrid
21:30 CEST (UTC+2)	Vinícius 65'; Casemiro (yellow card) 78'; Marcelo (yellow card) 90+3'	Report	Bruno (yellow card) 71'	Stadium: Alfredo Di Stéfano (Note: Due to the ongoing renovations of the Santiago Bernabéu, Real Madrid played their home matches at the Alfredo di Stéfano.); Attendance: 0 Referee: César Soto Grado

4 October 2020 4	Levante	0–2	Real Madrid	Villarreal
16:00 CEST (UTC+2)	Bardhi (yellow card) 72'; Miramón (yellow card) 90+3'	Report	Casemiro (yellow card) 4'; Vinícius 16'; Benzema 90+5'	Stadium: Estadio de la Cerámica (Note: The match was played at Estadio de la Cerámica due to the on-going renovations at Levante's home stadium, Ciutat de València.); Attendance: 0 Referee: José Luis Munuera Montero

17 October 2020 5	Real Madrid	0–1	Cádiz	Madrid
18:30 CEST (UTC+2)	Ramos (yellow card) 34'; Militão (yellow card) 90+2'	Report	Lozano 16'	Stadium: Alfredo Di Stéfano; Attendance: 0 Referee: Santiago Jaime Latre

24 October 2020 6	Barcelona	1–3	Real Madrid	Barcelona
16:00 CEST (UTC+2)	Fati 8'; Lenglet (yellow card) 29'; Alba (yellow card) 62'; Messi (yellow card) 90+1'	Report	Valverde 5'; Casemiro (yellow card) 19'; Nacho (yellow card) 37'; Ramos 63' (pen.); Modrić 90'	Stadium: Camp Nou; Attendance: 0 Referee: Juan Martínez Munuera

31 October 2020 7	Real Madrid	4–1	Huesca	Madrid
14:00 CET (UTC+1)	Hazard 40'; Benzema 45', 90'; Valverde 54'	Report	Ferreiro 74'; Siovas (yellow card) 79'; Ramírez (yellow card) 88'	Stadium: Alfredo Di Stéfano; Attendance: 0 Referee: Pablo González Fuertes

8 November 2020 8	Valencia	4–1	Real Madrid	Valencia
21:00 CET (UTC+1)	Soler 35' (pen.), 54' (pen.), 63' (pen.), (yellow card) 41'; Varane 43' (o.g.); Guillamón (yellow card) 84'; Doménech (yellow card) 86'	Report	Benzema 23'; Marcelo (yellow card) 52'; Ramos (yellow card) 62'	Stadium: Mestalla; Attendance: 0 Referee: Jesús Gil Manzano

21 November 2020 9	Villarreal	1–1	Real Madrid	Villarreal
16:15 CET (UTC+1)	Gerard 76' (pen.); Pino (yellow card) 90+1'	Report	Mariano 2'; Nacho (yellow card) 68'; Kroos (yellow card) 90+3'	Stadium: Estadio de la Cerámica; Attendance: 0 Referee: Alejandro José Hernández Hernández

28 November 2020 10	Real Madrid	1–2	Alavés	Madrid
21:00 CET (UTC+1)	Casemiro (yellow card) 18', (goal) 86'; Kroos (yellow card) 61'	Report	Pérez 5' (pen.); Joselu 49'; Rioja (yellow card) 67'; Duarte (yellow card) 76'; Méndez (yellow card) 88'	Stadium: Alfredo Di Stéfano; Attendance: 0 Referee: Adrián Cordero Vega

5 December 2020 11	Sevilla	0–1	Real Madrid	Seville
16:15 CET (UTC+1)	Gudelj (yellow card) 76'	Report	Kroos (yellow card) 44'; Bounou 55' (o.g.); Modrić (yellow card) 60'; Vinícius (yellow card) 89'	Stadium: Ramón Sánchez Pizjuán; Attendance: 0 Referee: José María Sánchez Martínez

12 December 2020 12	Real Madrid	2–0	Atlético Madrid	Madrid
21:00 CET (UTC+1)	Casemiro 15', (yellow card) 36'; Oblak 63' (o.g.)	Report	Lemar (yellow card) 46'; Correa (yellow card) 50'; Hermoso (yellow card) 61'	Stadium: Alfredo Di Stéfano; Attendance: 0 Referee: Antonio Mateu Lahoz

15 December 2020 13	Real Madrid	3–1	Athletic Bilbao	Madrid
22:00 CET (UTC+1)	Vázquez (yellow card) 42'; Kroos 45+2'; Benzema 74', 90+2'	Report	R. García (yellow card) 8' (yellow-red card) 13'; Capa 52'; Yeray (yellow card) 80'	Stadium: Alfredo Di Stéfano; Attendance: 0 Referee: Jesús Gil Manzano
Note: The match, originally scheduled for 20 January 2021, was moved forward, due to both teams' participation in the 2020–21 Supercopa de España.

20 December 2020 14	Eibar	1–3	Real Madrid	Eibar
21:00 CET (UTC+1)	Kike 28'; Arbilla (yellow card) 43'	Report	Benzema 6'; Modrić 13'; Vázquez 90+2'	Stadium: Ipurua; Attendance: 0 Referee: José Luis Munuera Montero

23 December 2020 15	Real Madrid	2–0	Granada	Madrid
19:45 CET (UTC+1)	Vázquez (yellow card) 17'; Casemiro 57'; Carvajal (yellow card) 81'; Benzema 90+3'	Report	Foulquier (yellow card) 27'	Stadium: Alfredo Di Stéfano; Attendance: 0 Referee: Juan Martínez Munuera

30 December 2020 16	Elche	1–1	Real Madrid	Elche
21:30 CET (UTC+1)	Chaves 52' (pen.); Verdú (yellow card) 73'	Report	Modrić 20'; Ramos (yellow card) 21'; Casemiro (yellow card) 60'; Carvajal (yellow card) 66'; Kroos (yellow card) 71'	Stadium: Martínez Valero; Attendance: 0 Referee: Jorge Figueroa Vázquez

2 January 2021 17	Real Madrid	2–0	Celta Vigo	Madrid
21:00 CET (UTC+1)	Vázquez 6'; Asensio (yellow card) 38', (goal) 53'; Nacho (yellow card) 50'; Carvajal (yellow card) 84'; Casemiro (yellow card) 87'	Report	Méndez (yellow card) 10'; Tapia (yellow card) 42'	Stadium: Alfredo Di Stéfano; Attendance: 0 Referee: Ricardo de Burgos Bengoetxea

9 January 2021 18	Osasuna	0–0	Real Madrid	Pamplona
21:00 CET (UTC+1)		Report		Stadium: El Sadar; Attendance: 0 Referee: César Soto Grado

23 January 2021 19	Alavés	1–4	Real Madrid	Vitoria-Gasteiz
21:00 CET (UTC+1)	Navarro (yellow card) 10'; García (yellow card) 49'; Joselu 59'; Laguardia (yellow card) 79'; Sainz (yellow card) 85'; Méndez (yellow card) 90+2'	Report	Casemiro 15'; Benzema 41', 70', (yellow card) 87'; Hazard 45+1'; Militão (yellow card) 59'; Mendy (yellow card) 86'	Stadium: Mendizorrotza; Attendance: 0 Referee: Alejandro José Hernández Hernández

30 January 2021 20	Real Madrid	1–2	Levante	Madrid
16:15 CET (UTC+1)	Militão (red card) 9'; Asensio 13'; Casemiro (yellow card) 90'	Report	Morales 32'; Malsa (yellow card) 50'; Melero (yellow card) 72'; Roger 78'	Stadium: Alfredo Di Stéfano; Attendance: 0 Referee: David Medié Jiménez

6 February 2021 21	Huesca	1–2	Real Madrid	Huesca
16:15 CET (UTC+1)	Maffeo (yellow card) 45'; Galán 48'; Silva (yellow card) 53'	Report	Kroos (yellow card) 32'; Varane 55', 83'	Stadium: El Alcoraz; Attendance: 0 Referee: Xavier Estrada Fernández

9 February 2021 22	Real Madrid	2–0	Getafe	Madrid
21:00 CEST (UTC+2)	Benzema 60'; Mendy 66', (yellow card) 71'	Report	Chakla (yellow card) 52'	Stadium: Alfredo Di Stéfano; Attendance: 0 Referee: Javier Alberola Rojas
Note: The match was originally scheduled for 13 September 2020, but was postponed because of Madrid's participation in the postponed 2019–20 UEFA Champions League and Getafe's participation in the postponed 2019–20 UEFA Europa League, which meant a later training start.

14 February 2021 23	Real Madrid	2–0	Valencia	Madrid
16:15 CET (UTC+1)	Benzema 12'; Kroos 42'	Report	Guedes (yellow card) 27'; Račić (yellow card) 44'; Correia (yellow card) 46'	Stadium: Alfredo Di Stéfano; Attendance: 0 Referee: José María Sánchez Martínez

20 February 2021 24	Valladolid	0–1	Real Madrid	Valladolid
21:00 CET (UTC+1)	Alcaraz (yellow card) 60'; Nacho (yellow card) 71'; Orellana (yellow card) 77'; Plano (yellow card) 85'	Report	Casemiro 65'; Vázquez (yellow card) 69'; Arribas (yellow card) 78'	Stadium: José Zorrilla; Attendance: 0 Referee: Guillermo Cuadra Fernández

1 March 2021 25	Real Madrid	1–1	Real Sociedad	Madrid
21:00 CET (UTC+1)	Vinícius 89'	Report	Portu 55'; Gorosabel (yellow card) 76'	Stadium: Alfredo Di Stéfano; Attendance: 0 Referee: Jesús Gil Manzano

7 March 2021 26	Atlético Madrid	1–1	Real Madrid	Madrid
16:15 CET (UTC+1)	Suárez 15'; Carrasco (yellow card) 64'; Correa (yellow card) 72'; Félix (yellow card) 80'; Savić (yellow card) 90'; Llorente (yellow card) 90+2'	Report	Varane (yellow card) 67'; Benzema 88'	Stadium: Wanda Metropolitano; Attendance: 0 Referee: Alejandro José Hernández Hernández

13 March 2021 27	Real Madrid	2–1	Elche	Madrid
16:15 CET (UTC+1)	Benzema (yellow card) 37', (goal) 73', 90+1'	Report	Calvo 61'; Carrillo (yellow card) 69'	Stadium: Alfredo Di Stéfano; Attendance: 0 Referee: Jorge Figueroa Vázquez

20 March 2021 28	Celta Vigo	1–3	Real Madrid	Vigo
16:15 CET (UTC+1)	Tapia (yellow card) 25'; Mina 40'; Suárez (yellow card) 78'; Solari (yellow card) 85'	Report	Benzema 20', 30'; Vinícius (yellow card) 22'; Kroos (yellow card) 39'; Nacho (yellow card) 70'; Modrić (yellow card) 81'; Asensio 90+4'	Stadium: Abanca-Balaídos; Attendance: 0 Referee: Mario Melero López

3 April 2021 29	Real Madrid	2–0	Eibar	Madrid
16:15 CEST (UTC+2)	Asensio 41'; Benzema 72'	Report	Gil (yellow card) 20'; Pozo (yellow card) 90+4'	Stadium: Alfredo Di Stéfano; Attendance: 0 Referee: Isidro Díaz de Mera Escuderos

10 April 2021 30	Real Madrid	2–1	Barcelona	Madrid
21:00 CEST (UTC+2)	Benzema 13'; Kroos 28'; Nacho (yellow card) 69'; Casemiro (yellow card) 89' (yellow-red card) 90'	Report	Pedri (yellow card) 23'; Araújo (yellow card) 26'; Mingueza 60'; Alba (yellow card) 84'	Stadium: Alfredo Di Stéfano; Attendance: 0 Referee: Jesús Gil Manzano

18 April 2021 31	Getafe	0–0	Real Madrid	Getafe
21:00 CEST (UTC+2)	Nyom (yellow card) 58'; Ángel (yellow card) 75'; Cucurella (yellow card) 86'	Report	Vinícius (yellow card) 54'	Stadium: Coliseum Alfonso Pérez; Attendance: 0 Referee: José María Sánchez Martínez
Note: The match, originally scheduled for 28 April 2021, was moved forward.

21 April 2021 32	Cádiz	0–3	Real Madrid	Cádiz
22:00 CEST (UTC+2)	Salvi (yellow card) 8'; Iza (yellow card) 29'; Jønsson (yellow card) 41'; Akapo (yellow card) 90+2'	Report	Varane (yellow card) 22'; Benzema 30' (pen.), 40'; Odriozola 33'; Nacho (yellow card) 46'; Marcelo (yellow card) 68'	Stadium: Ramón de Carranza; Attendance: 0 Referee: Antonio Mateu Lahoz

24 April 2021 33	Real Madrid	0–0	Real Betis	Madrid
21:00 CEST (UTC+2)	Isco (yellow card) 35'	Report	Bravo (yellow card) 90+3'; Morón (yellow card) 90+3'	Stadium: Alfredo Di Stéfano; Attendance: 0 Referee: Xavier Estrada Fernández

1 May 2021 34	Real Madrid	2–0	Osasuna	Madrid
21:00 CEST (UTC+2)	Militão 76'; Casemiro 80'	Report	Martínez (yellow card) 55'; Oier (yellow card) 55'	Stadium: Alfredo Di Stéfano; Attendance: 0 Referee: Guillermo Cuadra Fernández

9 May 2021 35	Real Madrid	2–2	Sevilla	Madrid
21:00 CEST (UTC+2)	Casemiro (yellow card) 21'; Asensio 67'; Hazard 90+5'	Report	Fernando 22'; Suso (yellow card) 56'; Rakitić 78' (pen.); Gudelj (yellow card) 85'	Stadium: Alfredo Di Stéfano; Attendance: 0 Referee: Juan Martínez Munuera

13 May 2021 36	Granada	1–4	Real Madrid	Granada
22:00 CEST (UTC+2)	Molina (yellow card) 41', (goal) 71'; Eteki (yellow card) 53'; Quina (yellow card) 72'	Report	Modrić 17', (yellow card) 49'; Militão (yellow card) 38'; Rodrygo 45+1'; Nacho (yellow card) 63'; Odriozola 75'; Benzema 76'	Stadium: Nuevo Los Cármenes; Attendance: 0 Referee: Jesús Gil Manzano

16 May 2021 37	Athletic Bilbao	0–1	Real Madrid	Bilbao
18:30 CEST (UTC+2)	Berenguer (yellow card) 14'; R. García (yellow card) 79', (red card) 89'; Martínez (yellow card) 80'	Report	Nacho 68', (yellow card) 82'; Valverde (yellow card) 90+1'	Stadium: San Mamés; Attendance: 0 Referee: Antonio Mateu Lahoz

22 May 2021 38	Real Madrid	2–1	Villarreal	Madrid
18:00 CEST (UTC+2)	Benzema 87'; Modrić 90+2'	Report	Pino 20'	Stadium: Alfredo Di Stéfano; Attendance: 0 Referee: José Luis Munuera Montero

==== Score overview ====
Win Draw Loss

Opposition	Home score	Away score	Double
Alavés	1–2	4–1	5–3
Athletic Bilbao	3–1	1–0	4–1
Atlético Madrid	2–0	1–1	3–1
Barcelona	2–1	3–1	5–2
Cádiz	0–1	3–0	3–1
Celta Vigo	2–0	3–1	5–1
Eibar	2–0	3–1	5–1
Elche	2–1	1–1	3–2
Getafe	2–0	0–0	2–0
Granada	2–0	4–1	6–1
Huesca	4–1	2–1	6–2
Levante	1–2	2–0	3–2
Osasuna	2–0	0–0	2–0
Real Betis	0–0	3–2	3–2
Real Sociedad	1–1	0–0	1–1
Sevilla	2–2	1–0	3–2
Valencia	2–0	1–4	3–4
Valladolid	1–0	1–0	2–0
Villarreal	2–1	1–1	3–2

=== Copa del Rey ===
Madrid entered the tournament in the round of 32, as they had participated in the 2020–21 Supercopa de España.

20 January 2021 Round of 32	Alcoyano	2–1 (a.e.t.)	Real Madrid	Alcoy
21:00 CET (UTC+1)	Sánchez (yellow card) 32'; Juanan (yellow card) 34', (goal) 115'; Solbes 80'; Primi (yellow card) 90+5'; López (yellow card) 103' (yellow-red card) 109'	Report	Militão 45'; Mariano (yellow card) 58'; Odriozola (yellow card) 78'; Lunin (yellow card) 116'	Stadium: El Collao; Attendance: 0 Referee: José María Sánchez Martínez

=== Supercopa de España ===
The draw was held on 17 December 2020.

14 January 2021 Semi-final	Real Madrid	1–2	Athletic Bilbao	Málaga
21:00 CET (UTC+1)	Vázquez (yellow card) 37'; Benzema 73'; Kroos (yellow card) 83'	Report	R. García 18', 38' (pen.); D. García (yellow card) 84'; Simón (yellow card) 88'	Stadium: La Rosaleda; Attendance: 0 Referee: Juan Martínez Munuera

=== UEFA Champions League ===
==== Group stage ====
The group stage draw was held on 1 October 2020.

Pos	Team	Pld	W	D	L	GF	GA	GD	Pts	Qualification	RMA	BMG	SHK	INT
1	(Spain) Real Madrid	6	3	1	2	11	9	+2	10	Advance to knockout phase	—	2–0	2–3	3–2
2	(Germany) Borussia Mönchengladbach	6	2	2	2	16	9	+7	8 (Note: Head-to-head points: Borussia Mönchengladbach 6, Shakhtar Donetsk 0.)	Advance to knockout phase	2–2	—	4–0	2–3
3	(Ukraine) Shakhtar Donetsk	6	2	2	2	5	12	−7	8	Transfer to Europa League	2–0	0–6	—	0–0
4	(Italy) Inter Milan	6	1	3	2	7	9	−2	6		0–2	2–2	0–0	—

Source: UEFA
Rules for classification: Group stage tiebreakers
Notes:

21 October 2020 1	Real Madrid (Spain)	2–3	(Ukraine) Shakhtar Donetsk	Madrid, Spain
18:55 CEST (UTC+2)	Asensio (yellow card) 34'; Modrić 54'; Vinícius 59'; Militão (yellow card) 87'	Report	Korniyenko (yellow card) 8'; Tetê 29'; Varane 33' (o.g.); Solomon 42'; Bondar (yellow card) 83'	Stadium: Alfredo Di Stéfano; Attendance: 0 Referee: Srđan Jovanović (Serbia)

27 October 2020 2	Borussia Mönchengladbach (Germany)	2–2	(Spain) Real Madrid	Mönchengladbach, Germany
21:00 CET (UTC+1)	Thuram 33', 58'; Stindl (yellow card) 55'; Bensebaini (yellow card) 78'; Neuhaus (yellow card) 85'	Report	Benzema 87'; Casemiro (yellow card) 89', (goal) 90+3'	Stadium: Borussia-Park; Attendance: 0 (Note: The match was played behind closed doors due to the COVID-19 pandemic in Germany.); Referee: Orel Grinfeld (Israel)

3 November 2020 3	Real Madrid (Spain)	3–2	(Italy) Inter Milan	Madrid, Spain
21:00 CET (UTC+1)	Benzema 25'; Ramos 33'; Mendy (yellow card) 48'; Valverde (yellow card) 62'; Rodrygo 80'; Casemiro (yellow card) 85'; Courtois (yellow card) 90+2'	Report	Martínez 35'; Vidal (yellow card) 44'; Brozović (yellow card) 51'; Perišić 68'; Barella (yellow card) 72'	Stadium: Alfredo Di Stéfano; Attendance: 0 Referee: Clément Turpin (France)

25 November 2020 4	Inter Milan (Italy)	0–2	(Spain) Real Madrid	Milan, Italy
21:00 CET (UTC+1)	Gagliardini (yellow card) 19'; Vidal (yellow card) 33' (yellow-red card) 33'; Sensi (yellow card) 86'	Report	Hazard 7' (pen.); Hakimi 59' (o.g.)	Stadium: San Siro; Attendance: 0 (Note: The match was played behind closed doors due to the COVID-19 pandemic in Italy.); Referee: Anthony Taylor (England)

1 December 2020 5	Shakhtar Donetsk (Ukraine)	2–0	(Spain) Real Madrid	Kyiv, Ukraine
19:55 EET (UTC+2)	Dentinho 57'; Solomon 82'	Report	Varane (yellow card) 14'	Stadium: NSC Olympiyskiy Stadium; Attendance: 0 (Note: The match was played behind closed doors due to the COVID-19 pandemic in Ukraine.); Referee: Ovidiu Hațegan (Romania)

9 December 2020 6	Real Madrid (Spain)	2–0	(Germany) Borussia Mönchengladbach	Madrid, Spain
21:00 CET (UTC+1)	Benzema 9', 32'	Report	Zakaria (yellow card) 88'	Stadium: Alfredo Di Stéfano; Attendance: 0 Referee: Björn Kuipers (Netherlands)

==== Knockout phase ====
===== Round of 16 =====
The draw for the round of 16 was held on 14 December 2020.

24 February 2021 First leg	Atalanta (Italy)	0–1	(Spain) Real Madrid	Bergamo, Italy
21:00 CET (UTC+1)	Freuler (red card) 18'; Gosens (yellow card) 71'	Report	Casemiro (yellow card) 23'; Mendy (yellow card) 55', (goal) 86'	Stadium: Stadio Atleti Azzurri d'Italia; Attendance: 0 Referee: Tobias Stieler (Germany)

16 March 2021 Second leg	Real Madrid (Spain)	3–1 (4–1 agg.)	(Italy) Atalanta	Madrid, Spain
21:00 CET (UTC+1)	Benzema 34'; Valverde (yellow card) 39'; Ramos 60' (pen.); Nacho (yellow card) 73'; Kroos (yellow card) 77'; Asensio 84'	Report	Tolói (yellow card) 58'; Muriel 83'	Stadium: Alfredo Di Stéfano; Attendance: 0 Referee: Danny Makkelie (Netherlands)

===== Quarter-finals =====
The draw for the quarter-finals and semi-finals was held on 19 March 2021.

6 April 2021 First leg	Real Madrid (Spain)	3–1	(England) Liverpool	Madrid, Spain
21:00 CEST (UTC+2)	Vinícius 27', 65'; Asensio 36'; Vázquez (yellow card) 49'	Report	Mané (yellow card) 39'; Salah 51'; Thiago (yellow card) 56'; Alexander-Arnold (yellow card) 83'	Stadium: Alfredo Di Stéfano; Attendance: 0 Referee: Felix Brych (Germany)

14 April 2021 Second leg	Liverpool (England)	0–0 (1–3 agg.)	(Spain) Real Madrid	Liverpool, England
20:00 BST (UTC+1)	Robertson (yellow card) 25'; Phillips (yellow card) 59'	Report	Casemiro (yellow card) 25'	Stadium: Anfield; Attendance: 0 (Note: The match was played behind closed doors due to the COVID-19 pandemic in England.); Referee: Björn Kuipers (Netherlands)

===== Semi-finals =====
27 April 2021 First leg	Real Madrid (Spain)	1–1	(England) Chelsea	Madrid, Spain
21:00 CEST (UTC+2)	Vinícius (yellow card) 27'; Benzema 29'; Kroos (yellow card) 60'; Marcelo (yellow card) 65'; Varane (yellow card) 78'; Odriozola (yellow card) 89'	Report	Pulisic 14', (yellow card) 38'	Stadium: Alfredo Di Stéfano; Attendance: 0 Referee: Danny Makkelie (Netherlands)

5 May 2021 Second leg	Chelsea (England)	2–0 (3–1 agg.)	(Spain) Real Madrid	London, England
20:00 BST (UTC+1)	Jorginho (yellow card) 14'; Werner 28'; Christensen (yellow card) 39'; Mount 85', (yellow card) 88'	Report	Ramos (yellow card) 36'; Nacho (yellow card) 62'; Kroos (yellow card) 72'; Valverde (yellow card) 90'	Stadium: Stamford Bridge; Attendance: 0 Referee: Daniele Orsato (Italy)

== Statistics ==
=== Squad statistics ===
No.	Pos	Nat	Player	Total		La Liga		Copa del Rey		Champions League		Supercopa de España	
No.	Pos	Nat	Player	Apps	Goals	Apps	Goals	Apps	Goals	Apps	Goals	Apps	Goals
1	GK	(Belgium)	Thibaut Courtois	51	0	38	0	0	0	12	0	1	0
2	DF	(Spain)	Dani Carvajal	15	0	13	0	0	0	2	0	0	0
3	DF	(Brazil)	Éder Militão	21	2	14	1	1	1	6	0	0	0
4	DF	(Spain)	Sergio Ramos	21	4	15	2	0	0	5	2	1	0
5	DF	(France)	Raphaël Varane	41	2	31	2	0	0	9	0	1	0
6	DF	(Spain)	Nacho	33	1	24	1	0	0	8	0	1	0
7	MF	(Belgium)	Eden Hazard	21	4	14	3	1	0	5	1	1	0
8	MF	(Germany)	Toni Kroos	42	3	28	3	1	0	12	0	1	0
9	FW	(France)	Karim Benzema	46	30	34	23	1	0	10	6	1	1
10	MF	(Croatia)	Luka Modrić	48	6	35	5	0	0	12	1	1	0
11	FW	(Spain)	Marco Asensio	48	7	35	5	1	0	11	2	1	0
12	DF	(Brazil)	Marcelo	19	0	16	0	1	0	2	0	0	0
13	GK	(Ukraine)	Andriy Lunin	1	0	0	0	1	0	0	0	0	0
14	MF	(Brazil)	Casemiro	46	7	34	6	1	0	10	1	1	0
15	MF	(Uruguay)	Federico Valverde	34	3	24	3	1	0	8	0	1	0
17	FW	(Spain)	Lucas Vázquez	34	2	25	2	1	0	7	0	1	0
19	DF	(Spain)	Álvaro Odriozola	16	2	13	2	1	0	2	0	0	0
20	FW	(Brazil)	Vinícius Júnior	48	6	34	3	1	0	12	3	1	0
22	MF	(Spain)	Isco	30	0	26	0	1	0	3	0	0	0
23	DF	(France)	Ferland Mendy	38	2	26	1	0	0	11	1	1	0
24	FW	(Dominican Republic)	Mariano	21	1	15	1	1	0	4	0	1	0
25	FW	(Brazil)	Rodrygo	34	2	23	1	0	0	11	1	0	0
28	MF	(Spain)	Marvin	4	0	4	0	0	0	0	0	0	0
30	MF	(Spain)	Sergio Arribas	10	0	8	0	0	0	2	0	0	0
31	MF	(Spain)	Antonio Blanco	4	0	4	0	0	0	0	0	0	0
32	DF	(Spain)	Víctor Chust	3	0	2	0	1	0	0	0	0	0
34	FW	(Spain)	Hugo Duro	3	0	2	0	0	0	1	0	0	0
35	DF	(Spain)	Miguel Gutiérrez	6	0	6	0	0	0	0	0	0	0
16	FW	(Spain)	Borja Mayoral‡	2	0	2	0	0	0	0	0	0	0
21	MF	(Norway)	Martin Ødegaard‡	9	0	7	0	0	0	2	0	0	0
18	FW	(Serbia)	Luka Jović‡	5	0	4	0	0	0	1	0	0	0

Source: Soccerway

- ^{‡} Player left the club mid-season

=== Goals ===
Rank	Player	La Liga	Copa del Rey	Champions League	Supercopa	Total
1	(France) Karim Benzema	23	0	6	1	30
2	(Spain) Marco Asensio	5	0	2	0	7
2	(Brazil) Casemiro	6	0	1	0	7
4	(Croatia) Luka Modrić	5	0	1	0	6
4	(Brazil) Vinícius Júnior	3	0	3	0	6
6	(Belgium) Eden Hazard	3	0	1	0	4
6	(Spain) Sergio Ramos	2	0	2	0	4
8	(Germany) Toni Kroos	3	0	0	0	3
8	(Uruguay) Federico Valverde	3	0	0	0	3
10	(France) Ferland Mendy	1	0	1	0	2
10	(Brazil) Éder Militão	1	1	0	0	2
10	(Spain) Álvaro Odriozola	2	0	0	0	2
10	(Brazil) Rodrygo	1	0	1	0	2
10	(France) Raphaël Varane	2	0	0	0	2
10	(Spain) Lucas Vázquez	2	0	0	0	2
16	(Dominican Republic) Mariano	1	0	0	0	1
16	(Spain) Nacho	1	0	0	0	1
Own goals		3	0	1	0	4
Total		67	1	19	1	88

=== Clean sheets ===
Rank	Player	La Liga	Copa del Rey	Champions League	Supercopa	Total
1	(Belgium) Thibaut Courtois	17	0	4	0	21
2	(Ukraine) Andriy Lunin	0	0	0	0	0
Total		17	0	4	0	21

=== Disciplinary record ===
N	P	Nat.	Name	La Liga			Copa del Rey			Champions League			Supercopa			Total			Notes
N	P	Nat.	Name	Yellow card	Second yellow card	Red card	Yellow card	Second yellow card	Red card	Yellow card	Second yellow card	Red card	Yellow card	Second yellow card	Red card	Yellow card	Second yellow card	Red card	Notes
3	DF	(Brazil)	Éder Militão	3		1				1						4		1	
14	MF	(Brazil)	Casemiro	9	1					4						13	1		
6	DF	(Spain)	Nacho	8						2						10			
8	MF	(Germany)	Toni Kroos	6						3			1			10			
2	DF	(Spain)	Dani Carvajal	5												5			
17	FW	(Spain)	Lucas Vázquez	3						1			1			5			
23	DF	(France)	Ferland Mendy	3						2						5			
4	DF	(Spain)	Sergio Ramos	3						1						4			
5	DF	(France)	Raphaël Varane	2						2						4			
10	MF	(Croatia)	Luka Modrić	4												4			
12	DF	(Brazil)	Marcelo	3						1						4			
15	MF	(Uruguay)	Federico Valverde	1						3						4			
20	FW	(Brazil)	Vinícius Júnior	3						1						4			
9	FW	(France)	Karim Benzema	2												2			
11	FW	(Spain)	Marco Asensio	1						1						2			
19	DF	(Spain)	Álvaro Odriozola				1			1						2			
1	GK	(Belgium)	Thibaut Courtois							1						1			
13	GK	(Ukraine)	Andriy Lunin				1									1			
22	MF	(Spain)	Isco	1												1			
24	FW	(Dominican Republic)	Mariano				1									1			
30	FW	(Spain)	Sergio Arribas	1												1			

Source: Soccerway
Ordered by (red card) , (second yellow card) and (yellow card)
(yellow card) = Number of bookings; (second yellow card) = Number of sending offs after a second yellow card; (red card) = Number of sending offs by a direct red card.
