= Raphaël Varane =

French footballer (born 1993)

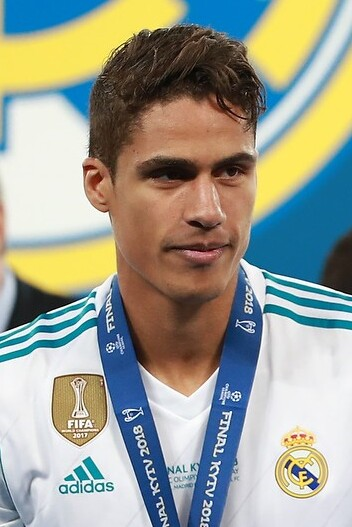
- Varane with Real Madrid in 2018

Personal information
- Full name: Raphaël Xavier Varane
- Date of birth: 25 April 1993 (age 33)
- Place of birth: Lille, Nord, France
- Height: 1.91 m (6 ft 3 in)
- Position: Centre-back

Youth career
- 2000–2002: Hellemmes
- 2002–2010: Lens

Senior career*
| Years | Team | Apps | (Gls) |
| 2010 | Lens II | 9 | (0) |
| 2010–2011 | Lens | 23 | (2) |
| 2011–2021 | Real Madrid | 236 | (8) |
| 2021–2024 | Manchester United | 68 | (2) |
| 2024 | Como | 0 | (0) |
| Total | | 336 | (12) |

International career
| 2010 | France U18 | 2 | (1) |
| 2012 | France U20 | 1 | (0) |
| 2011–2012 | France U21 | 13 | (3) |
| 2013–2022 | France | 93 | (5) |
Medal record
Men's football
Representing France
FIFA World Cup
| Winner | 2018 |
| Runner-up | 2022 |
UEFA Nations League
| Winner | 2021 |
- * Club domestic league appearances and goals

Raphaël Xavier Varane (French: [ʁafaɛl vaʁan]; born 25 April 1993) is a French former professional footballer who played as a centre-back. Often called the term "Rolls-Royce" defender in football, he is regarded as one of the best defenders of his generation.

Varane played for French club Lens at youth level and, ahead of the 2010–11 season, began training with the senior team and appeared on the bench in several league matches. Varane made his professional debut in 2010 aged 17, and after one season as a professional footballer, he joined Real Madrid. There, over the course of ten seasons from 2011 to 2021, he won eighteen trophies, including three La Liga titles, one Copa del Rey, four UEFA Champions League titles and four FIFA Club World Cups. In 2021, Varane left Real Madrid to sign for Manchester United, where he won the EFL Cup and FA Cup during a three-year spell. He departed England in 2024, joining newly-promoted Serie A side Como as a free agent, but after playing just 23 minutes for the club, picked up a knee injury and was removed from the squad list, before subsequently announcing his retirement from professional football in September 2024. After retiring from playing football, he joined the board of education working with youth players for Como 1907.

Varane represented France at under-18, under-20 and under-21 level, before making his senior international debut in March 2013. He was part of France's FIFA World Cup squad in 2014, when he was nominated for the Best Young Player award, in 2018, when he played every minute as France went on to win the competition, and in 2022, when France finished as runners-up. He additionally appeared at UEFA Euro 2020, and was part of the France squad that won the UEFA Nations League in 2021. Varane announced his retirement from international football in 2023, having earned 93 caps and scored five goals.

== Early life ==
Raphaël Xavier Varane was born on 25 April 1993 in the city of Lille in the Nord department. He is of Martiniquais heritage through his father, Gaston, who is originally from Le Morne-Rouge, while his mother, Annie, was raised in Saint-Amand-les-Eaux.

== Club career ==
=== Early career ===
Varane began his football career in the Arrondissement of Lille playing for local club Hellemmes at the age of seven. After spending two years at the club, in July 2002, he joined professional club Lens, despite some interest from Derby du Nord rivals and hometown club Lille. Similar to the development of the club's previous prized assets such as Gaël Kakuta and Timothée Kolodziejczak, Varane spent time at the Centre de Préformation de Football in nearby Liévin, a training centre exclusively for players brought up in the Nord-Pas-de-Calais region. He spent two years at the centre training there during the weekdays and playing with Lens on the weekends.

After returning full-time to Lens, Varane quickly ascended up the club's youth ranks. In the 2008–09 season, alongside teammates Thorgan Hazard and Geoffrey Kondogbia, he played on the club's under-16 team that won the Championnat National des 16 ans. In the following season, Varane was promoted to the club's under-19 team, despite being two years younger than several of his teammates. Ahead of the 2010–11 season, Varane signed his first professional contract. He was, subsequently, promoted to the club's reserve team in the Championnat de France amateur. Varane made his amateur debut in the club's opening league match of the campaign in a 2–0 victory over Drancy. He appeared as a starter in the club's next nine matches with the team losing only one of them.

=== Lens ===
In late October of the campaign, Varane was called up to the senior team by manager Jean-Guy Wallemme to train ahead of the club's match against Montpellier on 6 November. He trained with the team for the entire week and, due to an injury to centre-back Alaeddine Yahia, Varane was, surprisingly, named to the starting line-up. In the match, he played the full 90 minutes in a 2–0 victory. The victory was only the club's third clean sheet of the season. Varane was praised by teammates, most notably captain Adil Hermach, defensive partner Éric Chelle, and striker David Pollet, as well as by the local media and coach Wallemme. In the next two matches, Varane, alongside several other youth players, sat on the bench as Lens faced two tough teams in Marseille and Lyon. He returned to the starting line-up on 30 November in a 4–1 defeat to Brest. Despite the firing of Wallemme following the Brest match, Varane remained a starter in the team under new manager László Bölöni. In December, with both Chelle and Yahia returning to action, Varane was placed in the defensive midfielder role in the team's match against Bordeaux. In the match, he acted as a roving third centre-back and made a blocked save in the 84th minute on a close range shot by Yoan Gouffran to preserve a 2–1 lead. However, in the latter stages of the match, Bordeaux equalized to draw the match at 2–2.

In early 2011, Varane was the subject of transfer speculation linking him to several clubs. In an effort to quell the interest, on 3 February 2011, he signed a two-year contract extension with Lens until 2015. On 8 May, Varane scored his first professional goal in a 1–1 draw with Caen. In the team's following match against Monaco, he scored the equalizing goal in another 1–1 draw. Despite the goal, the stalemate condemned Lens to relegation back to Ligue 2 after two seasons in the top division. On 21 May, Varane captained Lens in its 1–0 defeat to Arles-Avignon.

=== Real Madrid ===
==== 2011–12: Signing and La Liga win ====
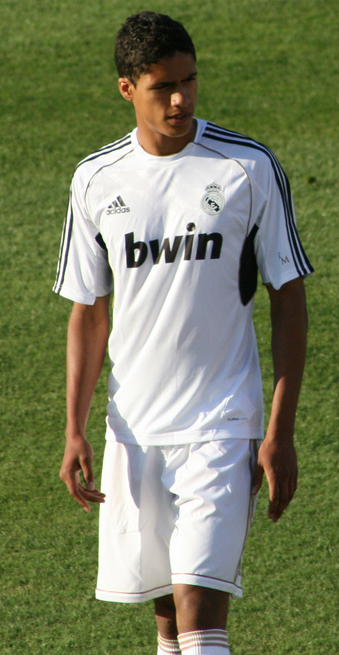
Varane training with Real Madrid in 2011

On 22 June 2011, Lens president Gervais Martel confirmed to a group of supporters at a club meeting that Varane would be joining La Liga club Real Madrid. Varane had previously visited Real Madrid's club facilities and also met with club advisor and compatriot Zinedine Zidane. On 27 June, the move was confirmed by Real Madrid after Varane passed his medical. Varane signed a six-year contract with the club.

Varane was assigned the number 19 shirt and made his club debut for Real Madrid in the club's opening pre-season fixture against American outfit Los Angeles Galaxy in the 2011 World Football Challenge. He appeared as a half-time substitute as Real Madrid cruised to a 4–1 win. Varane made his first start for the club four days later in a 3–0 win over Mexican club Guadalajara. He finished the pre-season campaign appearing in seven of the eight pre-season matches Real Madrid contested.

Varane made his competitive debut for Real Madrid on 21 September in the team's league match against Racing Santander. He started the match at centre-back alongside Ricardo Carvalho as the match ended 0–0. In the team's next league match three days later against Rayo Vallecano, Varane started and scored his first goal for the club after a flying back-heel shot following a Mesut Özil corner. Real Madrid won the match 6–2. Varane's goal made him the youngest foreign player at 18 years and 152 days to score a goal in a competitive match for Real Madrid. On 27 September, he made his UEFA Champions League debut in a 3–0 group stage win over Dutch club Ajax. Two months later, Varane made his second Champions League appearance against Croatian club Dinamo Zagreb. In the match, Varane started and assisted on the team's fifth goal, scored by José Callejón, in a 6–2 win. The victory ensured Real Madrid first place in its group.

==== 2012–2016: First-team regular, UEFA Champions League wins ====
Ahead of the 2012–13 season, Varane switched to the number 2 shirt. After failing to appear in Real Madrid's first four league matches, he made his season debut on 18 September in the club's opening UEFA Champions League group stage match against English club Manchester City. Varane started and played the entire match as Real Madrid won 3–2.

On 30 January 2013, Varane made his El Clásico debut against Barcelona in the 2012–13 Copa del Rey. He stopped a group of dangerous attempts from Barcelona, including a shot from Xavi that he cleared from the goal line. He capped his performance with a headed goal in the game, which ended 1–1. He also became the second-youngest foreign player to score for Real Madrid in a Clásico match. In the return leg at the Camp Nou on 26 February 2013, Varane scored Madrid's third goal in a 3–1 away win with a header from a corner kick by Mesut Özil. Varane gained praise from former World Cup winner Bixente Lizarazu after his performances against Barcelona and Manchester United. He said, "We are talking about a kid at Real Madrid who has unseated Pepe, and Pepe, with all his stuff, is still a great centre-half. His performance against Manchester United and Barcelona was extraordinary". Varane continued to impress in the Champions League quarter final first leg against Galatasaray, where he helped Madrid keep a clean sheet in a 3–0 triumph. All of his 27 passes found his teammates without any interception, and all of his tackles succeeded, with most on Didier Drogba.

In April 2013, Varane was named by Marca readers as a member of the "Best foreign eleven in Real Madrid's history". On 14 May 2013, Varane successfully underwent an operation on his right knee after an injury he had picked up during his last 2012–13 league match against Real Sociedad.

Varane came on as an injury-time substitute for Karim Benzema in the 2014 Copa del Rey Final which Real Madrid won 2–1 against Barcelona on 16 April. He played all 120 minutes of Real Madrid's 4–1 win over Atlético Madrid in the 2014 UEFA Champions League Final, in place of the more experienced Pepe. In added time at the end of extra time, after Cristiano Ronaldo scored the last goal, Varane kicked the ball towards Atlético manager Diego Simeone, causing him to run onto the pitch in anger. Simeone was sent to the stands and Varane booked for the incident. After the game, Atlético captain Gabi excused Varane due to his youth, while Simeone himself said, "I also made a mistake with my reaction. He's a young guy with a bright future." On 18 September 2014, Varane signed a new six-year contract to keep him at Real Madrid until 2020. He was a part-time squad player when the team won the 2015–16 UEFA Champions League.

==== 2016–2021: Continued success ====
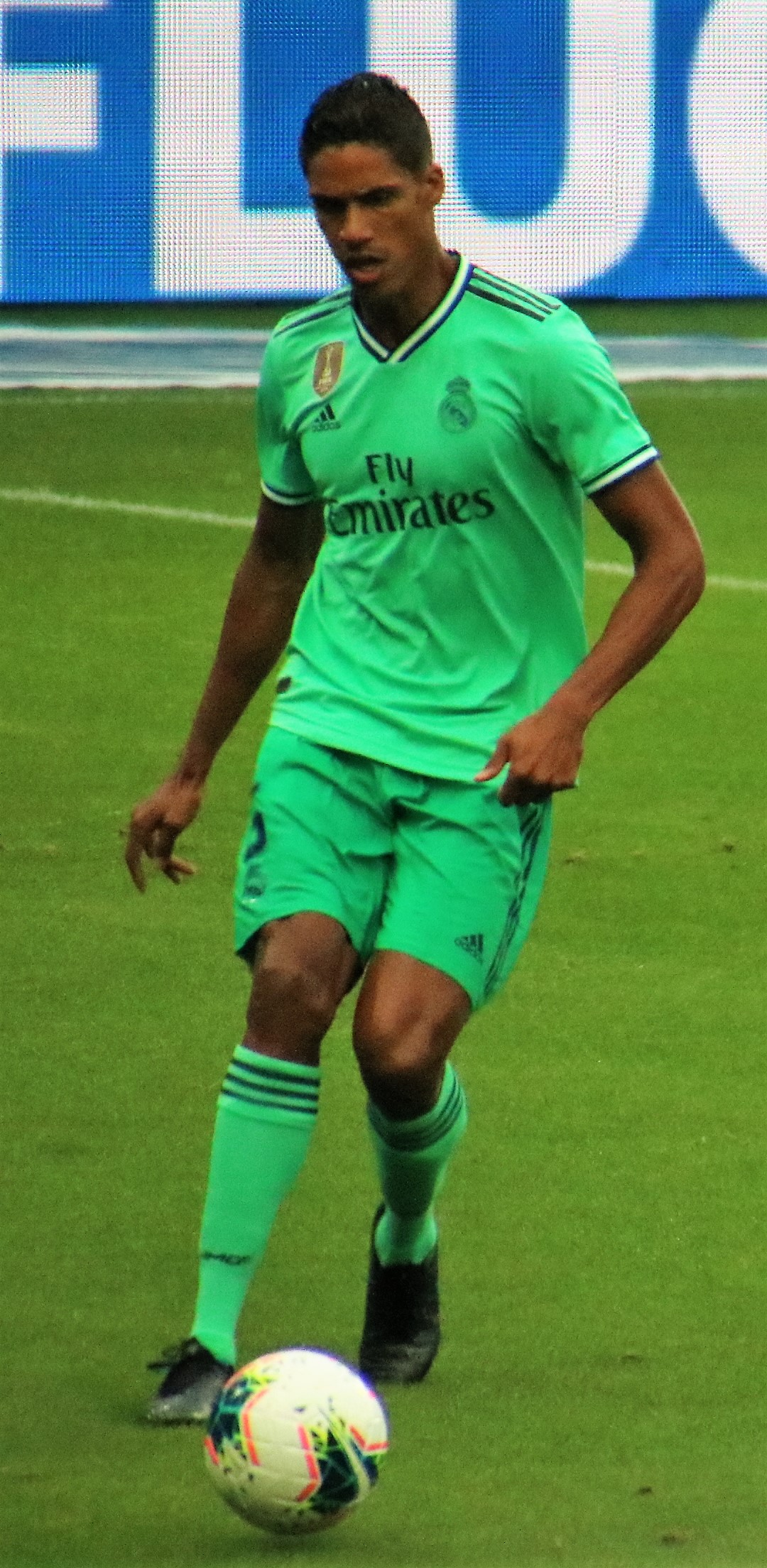
Varane playing for Real Madrid in 2019

Despite having a few injuries during the season, he made 23 appearances, when Madrid won the 2016–17 La Liga. He was starting in the final when Madrid won the 2016–17 UEFA Champions League.

Varane's contract was extended until 2022 on 27 September 2017. During the 2017–18 UEFA Champions League, he made eleven appearances, when Madrid won their 13th Champions League title and completed a hattrick of UCL titles under Zinedine Zidane. Following his club and international performances throughout the year, he was included in the 30-man shortlist for the 2018 Ballon d'Or, finishing in seventh place in the final ranking. He was also placed ninth in The Best FIFA Men's Player behind Kevin De Bruyne, and was elected as the starting centre-back for both the 2018 FIFPRO Men's World 11 and the UEFA Team of the Year.

During the 2018–19 season, he made 43 appearances, while winning the 2018 FIFA Club World Cup. He was a regular starter during the following league season, as Real Madrid won the 2019–20 La Liga title. During the Champions League, Madrid were eliminated in the round of 16 by Manchester City. In the second leg at the City of Manchester Stadium, Manchester, Madrid lost the game 2–1, with Varane being deemed to be at fault for both goals. He would later issue an apology for his mistakes.

=== Manchester United ===
Varane playing for Manchester United in 2021

On 27 July 2021, it was announced that Manchester United and Real Madrid had reached an agreement for Varane's transfer, subject to a medical and to player terms being finalised. The transfer was completed on 14 August 2021, after Varane was announced in front of a packed Old Trafford crowd ahead of United's Premier League opener against Leeds United. He was given the number 19 shirt previously worn by Amad Diallo, which he also donned during his first season with Real Madrid. He made his debut on 29 August 2021 and contributed an assist to the winning goal in a 1–0 win away against Wolverhampton Wanderers. On 2 May 2022, Varane scored his first goal for the club in a 3–0 league win against Brentford.

On 22 October 2022, Varane suffered a leg injury in a Premier League match against Chelsea. United manager Erik ten Hag said in a press conference on 26 October that the injury would rule Varane out of all of the club's matches ahead of the break for the 2022 FIFA World Cup, leaving his chances of being selected in the France squad for the tournament uncertain.

On 26 February 2023, Raphaël Varane won his first trophy with United as he took place in the starting line-up in the EFL Cup final against Newcastle United at Wembley, which Manchester United won 2–0. On 14 August 2023, Varane scored the winning goal in Manchester United's first game of the 2023–24 season in a 1–0 win against Wolverhampton Wanderers.

On 14 May 2024, Varane announced that he would depart the club at the end of the season as a free agent. On 25 May 2024, Varane made his final appearance for the Red Devils, lifting the FA Cup after a 2–1 victory against local rivals Manchester City at Wembley. In total, he made 95 appearances for United and scored two goals.

=== Como and retirement ===
On 28 July 2024, it was announced that Serie A club Como signed Varane on a two-year deal with an option to extend. On 11 August, he sustained a knee injury in the first half of a Coppa Italia match against Sampdoria, his first match with the club. Later that month, he was excluded from the club's Serie A squad list. He announced his retirement on 25 September 2024.

== International career ==
=== Youth ===
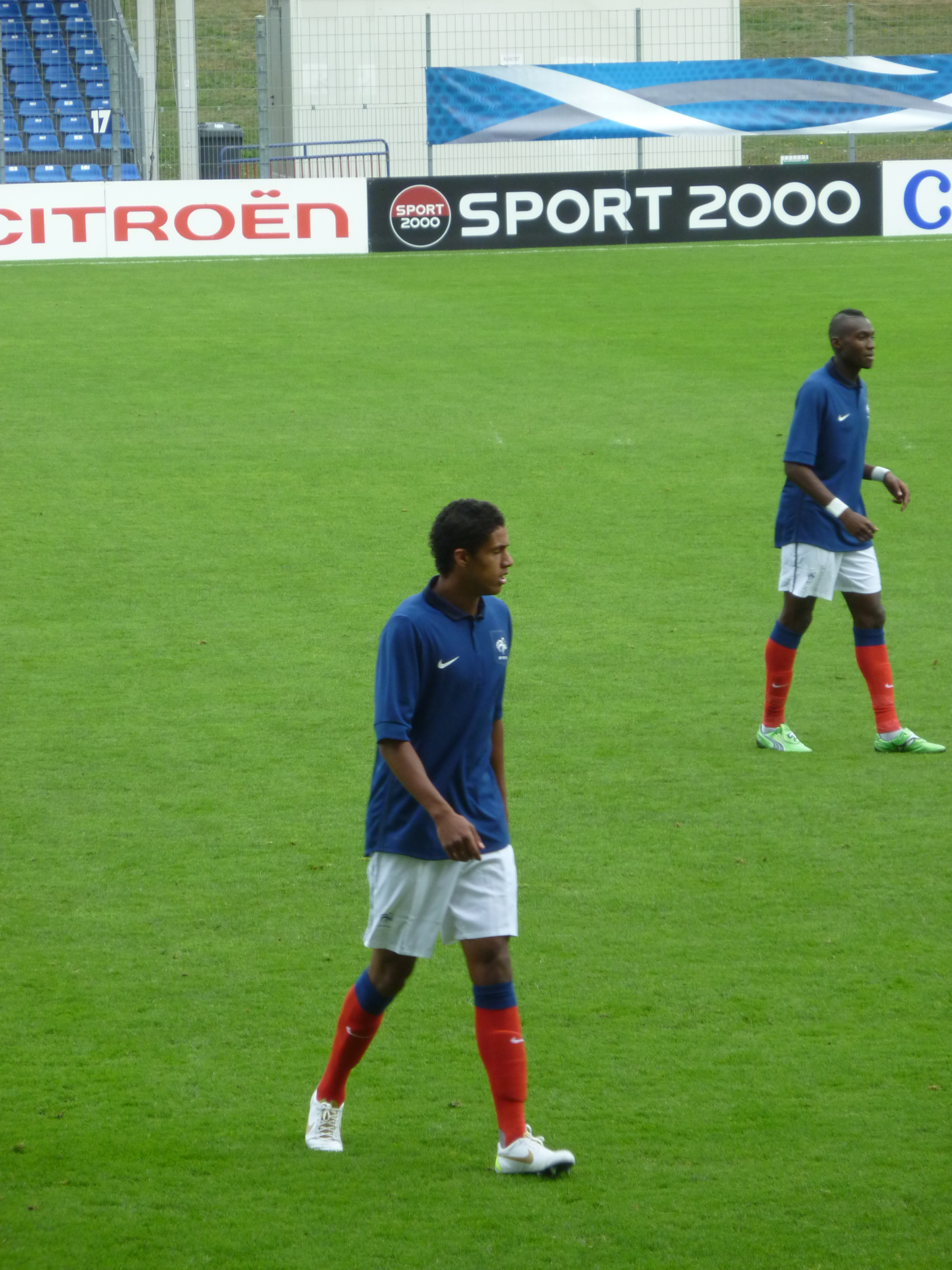
Varane playing for France U21 in 2011

Varane was a France youth international having earned caps at under-18, under-20 and under-21 levels.

Prior to playing for the under-18 team, he was called up to the under-17 team but did not make an appearance. Varane made his debut with the under-18 team on 24 August 2010 in a friendly match against Denmark. On his debut, he scored the final goal in a 2–0 victory. Varane turned down subsequent call-ups to the under-18 team because of his increased participation with the Lens first team and, as a result, missed the Tournoi de Limoges and a tournament in Israel. On 3 February 2011, he was called up to the under-21 team by coach Erick Mombaerts for the first time for a friendly match against Slovakia. Varane described the call up as "a huge surprise". He earned his first under-21 cap and start in the match against Slovakia playing the entire match in a 3–1 win. On 15 November, Varane scored his first under-21 goal in a 2–0 2013 Euro U-21 qualifying win over Slovakia. The victory ensured France qualification to at least the competition's qualifying play-offs.

=== Senior ===
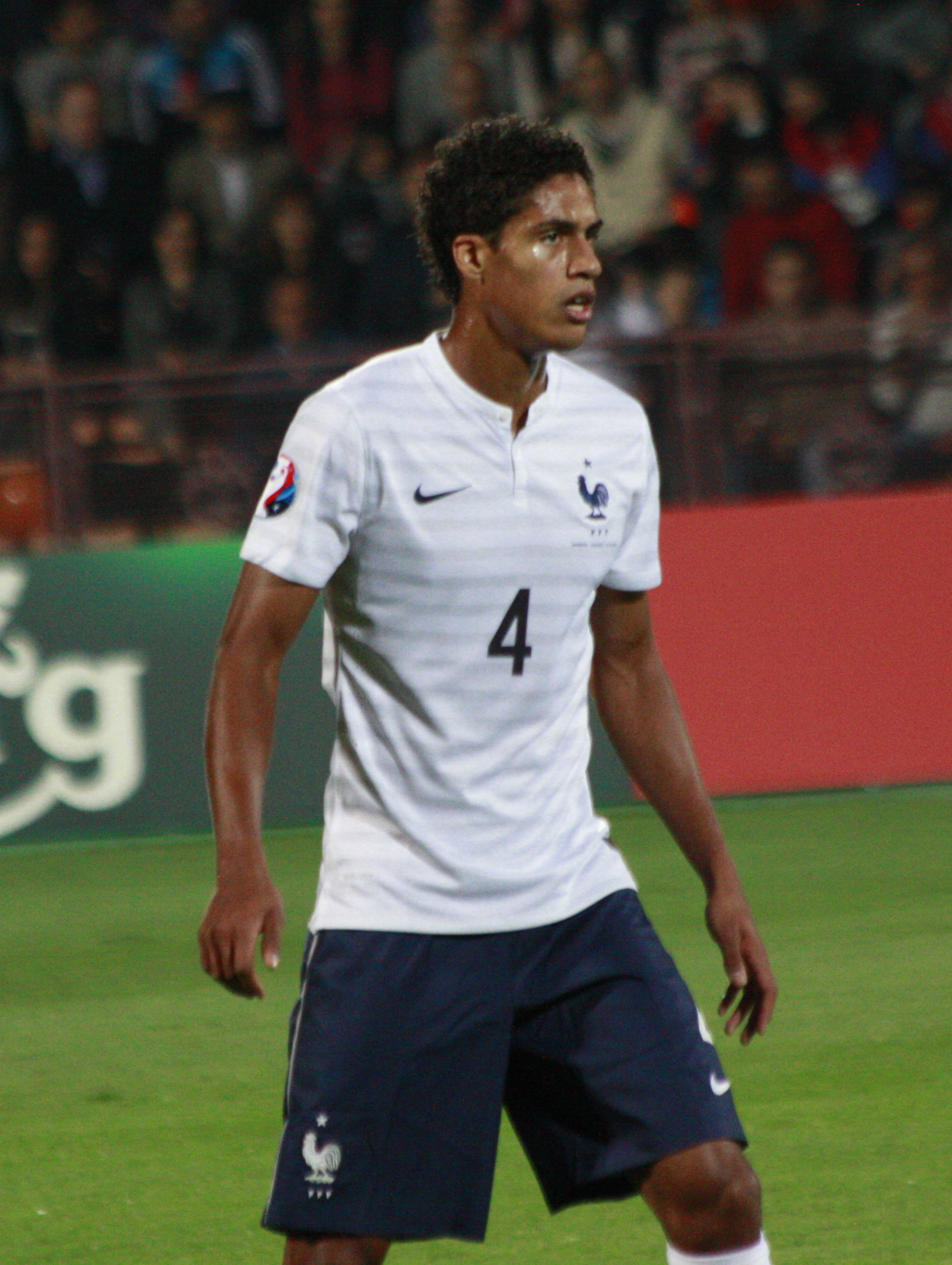
Varane playing for France in 2014

In August 2012, Varane was called up to the France national team for a friendly against Uruguay, but was an unused substitute. He started his first match for France on 22 March 2013 in a qualifier for the World Cup against Georgia, a 3–1 victory. On 13 May 2014, he was included in Didier Deschamps' squad for the 2014 FIFA World Cup.

On 15 June 2014, he partnered Mamadou Sakho in central defence for Les Bleus' first World Cup fixture—a 3–0 win over Honduras. He was also in the starting line-up for the second group match against Switzerland and the knockout matches against Nigeria and Germany, as France were eliminated at the quarter-final stage by the Germans 1–0. Varane took the blame for allowing Mats Hummels to hold him off at the critical set-piece which allowed the German defender to head the winning goal. In spite of this, Varane was named on the three-man shortlist for the tournament's Best Young Player award. On 14 October, Varane became the youngest player to captain France when he took over from Blaise Matuidi at half time in a 3–0 win over Armenia. He was then selected as the team's starting captain for a home friendly against Sweden on 18 November, where he scored his first international goal to give Les Bleus a 1–0 win.

On 24 May 2016, he was ruled out of UEFA Euro 2016 with a thigh injury, and was replaced by Adil Rami.

On 17 May 2018, Varane was called up to France's 23-man squad for the 2018 FIFA World Cup. He would go on to start in all seven of France's games and play every minute. In the quarter-final against Uruguay, Varane scored the opening goal with a header in France's 2–0 victory. France later went on to win the competition for the second time in history, and Varane became only the fourth player to be a World Cup champion and Champions League winner in the same year, after Christian Karembeu (in 1998), Roberto Carlos (in 2002) and Sami Khedira (in 2014). All the players, like Varane, were playing for Real Madrid at the time they won the World Cup.

In May 2021, he was included in the squad for the UEFA Euro 2020. He played in every minute of France's four matches at the tournament, including the period of extra time at the end of their round of 16 match against Switzerland; that match went to penalties, but Varane was not selected to take one of the first five kicks as France lost 5–4.

In November 2022, Varane made the 26-man squad for France for the 2022 FIFA World Cup. On 18 December, Varane was named in the starting line-up for France as they played their second successive World Cup final, eventually losing 4–2 on penalties to Argentina.

On 2 February 2023, at 29 years old, Varane announced his retirement from international football via his Instagram account. The defender shared a series of photos from his international career alongside the announcement. The announcement marked the end of his ten-year run with the national team where he made 93 appearances and scored 5 goals.

== After football retirement ==
Having been a part of Como's team until 2024, after retirement, Varane took up a role on the Education board of the team partnering with Osian Roberts and Juliette Bolon by focusing on youth development and educating programs.

== Style of play ==
Varane was described by Lens youth coach Éric Assadourian as a "truly first-class player" who was "comfortable on both the tactical and technical level." On 30 January 2013, the then-Real Madrid assistant coach Aitor Karanka talked about Varane in the press conference post-El Clásico of the Copa del Rey, saying, "It's obvious that Varane has a good head on his shoulders and will keep improving." Varane's height made him effective in the air, while his confidence on the ball allowed him to evade the opposing team's press and start attacking plays from the back with his passing.

Former France defender Frank Leboeuf believed that Varane had the potential to be better than Real Madrid legend Fernando Hierro, saying to reporters, "Many compare him to Hierro due to his technique, but on the physical level he is stronger and he is much faster." Both Hierro and José Mourinho labelled Varane as one of the best defenders in world football.

== Personal life ==
Varane is married to his long-time partner Camille Tytgat, and they have a son named Ruben and a daughter named Anaïs.

When Zinedine Zidane called Varane about Real Madrid's interest in signing him in June 2011, Varane asked Zidane to call him back because he was in the middle of studying for his baccalaureate exam.

His half-brother, Jonathan Varane, is a professional footballer who plays for Queens Park Rangers. His sister, Annabelle Varane, was Miss Nord-Pas-de-Calais 2018 and competed in Miss France 2019.

In an interview for L'Équipe in April 2024, Varane said that concussions suffered in various official matches throughout his career had "damaged [his] body", as he suggested to avoid teaching children heading and called for wider awareness among players around the dangers of repeated head trauma to brain health. He also revealed how symptoms of concussions had a negative impact on some of his performances, including the quarter-final match against Germany in the 2014 FIFA World Cup and the second leg of the round of 16 match against Manchester City in the 2019–20 UEFA Champions League.

== Career statistics ==
=== Club ===
Appearances and goals by club, season and competition
| Club | Season | League | | | National cup (Note: Includes Coupe de France, Copa del Rey, FA Cup, Coppa Italia) | | League cup (Note: Includes EFL Cup) | | Europe | | Other | | Total | |
| Club | Season | Division | Apps | Goals | Apps | Goals | Apps | Goals | Apps | Goals | Apps | Goals | Apps | Goals |
|---|---|---|---|---|---|---|---|---|---|---|---|---|---|---|
| Lens II | 2010–11 | CFA | 9 | 0 | — | | — | | — | | — | | 9 | 0 |
| Lens | 2010–11 | Ligue 1 | 23 | 2 | 1 | 0 | 0 | 0 | — | | — | | 24 | 2 |
| Real Madrid | 2011–12 | La Liga | 9 | 1 | 2 | 1 | — | | 4 (Note: Appearances in UEFA Champions League) | 0 | 0 | 0 | 15 | 2 |
| Real Madrid | 2012–13 | La Liga | 15 | 0 | 7 | 2 | — | | 11 | 0 | 0 | 0 | 33 | 2 |
| Real Madrid | 2013–14 | La Liga | 14 | 0 | 2 | 0 | — | | 7 | 0 | — | | 23 | 0 |
| Real Madrid | 2014–15 | La Liga | 27 | 0 | 4 | 2 | — | | 12 | 0 | 3 (Note: One appearance in Supercopa de España, two appearances in FIFA Club World Cup) | 0 | 46 | 2 |
| Real Madrid | 2015–16 | La Liga | 26 | 0 | 0 | 0 | — | | 7 | 0 | — | | 33 | 0 |
| Real Madrid | 2016–17 | La Liga | 23 | 1 | 3 | 1 | — | | 10 | 2 | 3 (Note: One appearance in UEFA Super Cup, two appearances in FIFA Club World Cup) | 0 | 39 | 4 |
| Real Madrid | 2017–18 | La Liga | 27 | 0 | 1 | 0 | — | | 11 | 0 | 5 (Note: One appearance in UEFA Super Cup, two appearances in Supercopa de España, two appearances in FIFA Club World Cup) | 0 | 44 | 0 |
| Real Madrid | 2018–19 | La Liga | 32 | 2 | 4 | 0 | — | | 4 | 0 | 3 | 0 | 43 | 2 |
| Real Madrid | 2019–20 | La Liga | 32 | 2 | 1 | 1 | — | | 8 | 0 | 2 (Note: Appearance(s) in Supercopa de España) | 0 | 43 | 3 |
| Real Madrid | 2020–21 | La Liga | 31 | 2 | 0 | 0 | — | | 9 | 0 | 1 | 0 | 41 | 2 |
| Real Madrid | Total | | 236 | 8 | 24 | 7 | — | | 83 | 2 | 17 | 0 | 360 | 17 |
| Manchester United | 2021–22 | Premier League | 22 | 1 | 2 | 0 | 0 | 0 | 5 | 0 | — | | 29 | 1 |
| Manchester United | 2022–23 | Premier League | 24 | 0 | 3 | 0 | 2 | 0 | 5 (Note: Appearances in UEFA Europa League) | 0 | — | | 34 | 0 |
| Manchester United | 2023–24 | Premier League | 22 | 1 | 5 | 0 | 1 | 0 | 4 | 0 | — | | 32 | 1 |
| Manchester United | Total | | 68 | 2 | 10 | 0 | 3 | 0 | 14 | 0 | — | | 95 | 2 |
| Como | 2024–25 | Serie A | 0 | 0 | 1 | 0 | — | | — | | — | | 1 | 0 |
| Career total | | | 336 | 12 | 36 | 7 | 3 | 0 | 97 | 2 | 17 | 0 | 489 | 21 |

=== International ===
Appearances and goals by national team and year
| National team | Year | Apps | Goals |
|---|---|---|---|
| France | 2013 | 4 | 0 |
| France | 2014 | 13 | 1 |
| France | 2015 | 10 | 1 |
| France | 2016 | 8 | 0 |
| France | 2017 | 5 | 0 |
| France | 2018 | 14 | 1 |
| France | 2019 | 10 | 2 |
| France | 2020 | 7 | 0 |
| France | 2021 | 12 | 0 |
| France | 2022 | 10 | 0 |
| Total | | 93 | 5 |

France score listed first, score column indicates score after each Varane goal

List of international goals scored by Raphaël Varane
| No. | Date | Venue | Cap | Opponent | Score | Result | Competition |
|---|---|---|---|---|---|---|---|
| 1 | 18 November 2014 | Stade Vélodrome, Marseille, France | 17 | Sweden | 1–0 | 1–0 | Friendly |
| 2 | 26 March 2015 | Stade de France, Saint-Denis, France | 18 | Brazil | 1–0 | 1–3 | Friendly |
| 3 | 6 July 2018 | Nizhny Novgorod Stadium, Nizhny Novgorod, Russia | 47 | Uruguay | 1–0 | 2–0 | 2018 FIFA World Cup |
| 4 | 22 March 2019 | Zimbru Stadium, Chișinău, Moldova | 55 | Moldova | 2–0 | 4–1 | UEFA Euro 2020 qualifying |
| 5 | 14 November 2019 | Stade de France, Saint-Denis, France | 63 | Moldova | 1–1 | 2–1 | UEFA Euro 2020 qualifying |

== Honours ==
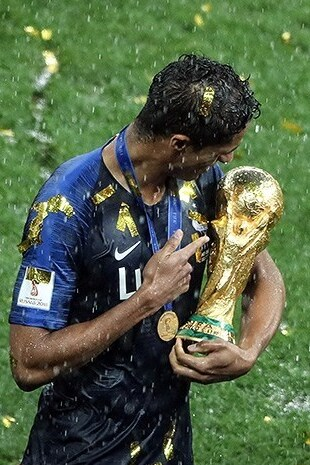
Varane after winning the 2018 FIFA World Cup with France

Real Madrid

- La Liga: 2011–12, 2016–17, 2019–20
- Copa del Rey: 2013–14
- Supercopa de España: 2012, 2017, 2020
- UEFA Champions League: 2013–14, 2015–16, 2016–17, 2017–18
- UEFA Super Cup: 2014, 2016, 2017
- FIFA Club World Cup: 2014, 2016, 2017, 2018

Manchester United

- FA Cup: 2023–24; runner-up: 2022–23
- EFL Cup: 2022–23

France

- FIFA World Cup: 2018; runner-up: 2022
- UEFA Nations League: 2020–21

Individual

- FIFA FIFPRO World 11: 2018
- UEFA Team of the Year: 2018
- UEFA Champions League Squad of the Season: 2017–18
- FIFA World Cup Fantasy Team: 2018
- FIFA World Cup Dream Team: 2018
- IFFHS Men's World Team: 2018

Orders

- Knight of the Legion of Honour: 2018
