= 2018–19 Real Madrid CF season =

115th season in existence of Real Madrid CF

Real Madrid
2018–19 season
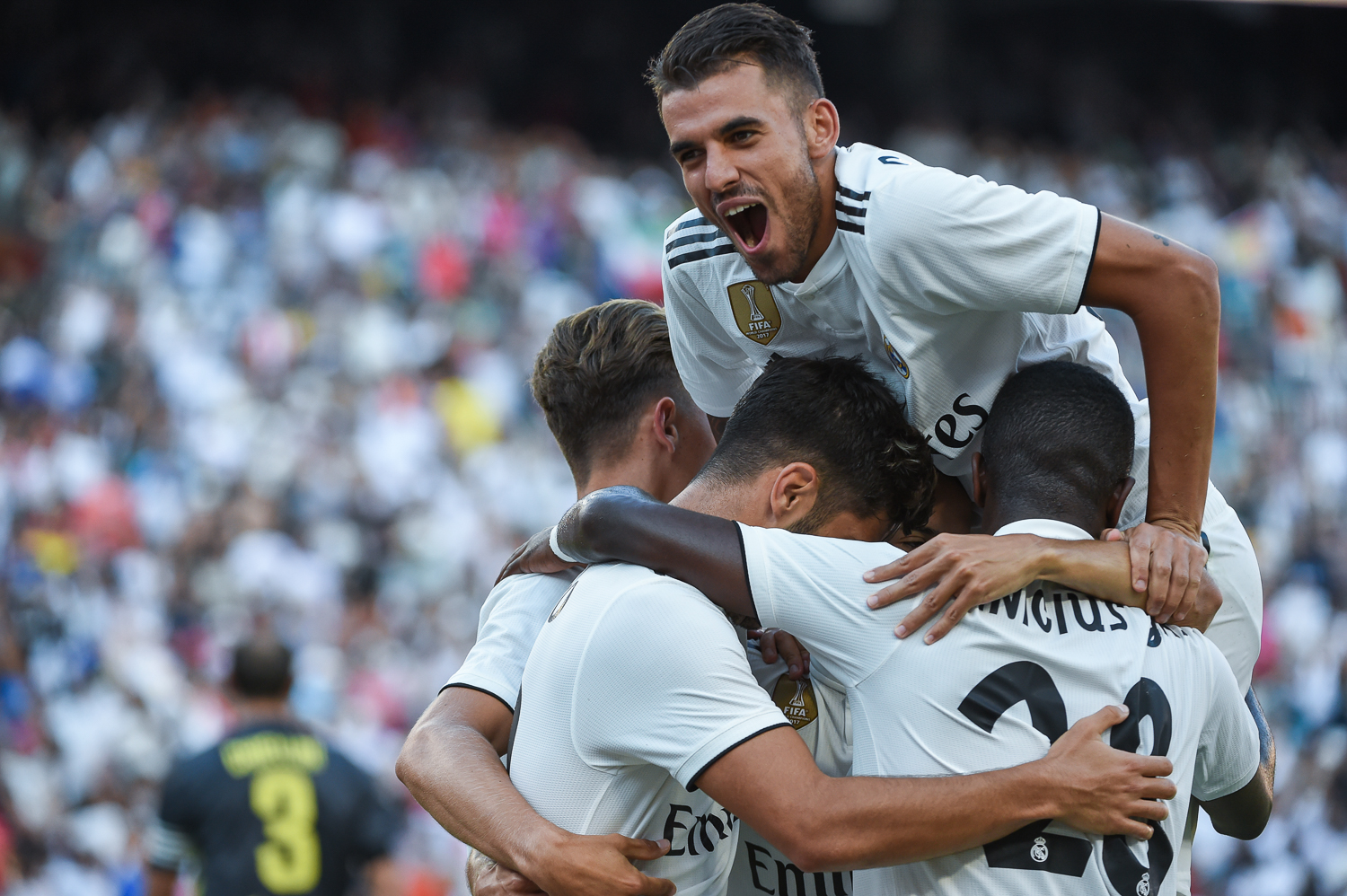
- Real Madrid players during a pre-season game against Juventus in August 2018
- President: Florentino Pérez
- Head coach: Julen Lopetegui (until 29 October); Santiago Solari (30 October to 11 March); Zinedine Zidane (from 11 March)
- Stadium: Santiago Bernabéu
- La Liga: 3rd
- Copa del Rey: Semi-finals
- UEFA Champions League: Round of 16
- UEFA Super Cup: Runners-up
- FIFA Club World Cup: Winners
- Top goalscorer: League: Karim Benzema (21); All: Karim Benzema (30)
- Highest home attendance: 80,472 vs Barcelona (27 February 2019)
- Lowest home attendance: 44,231 vs Leganés (9 January 2019)
- Average home league attendance: 60,967
- Biggest win: Viktoria Plzeň 0–5 Real Madrid; Real Madrid 6–1 UD Melilla
- Biggest defeat: Barcelona 5–1 Real Madrid
Home colours	Away colours	Third colours

The 2018–19 season was Real Madrid Club de Fútbol's 115th season in existence and the club's 88th consecutive season in the top flight of Spanish football. It covered a period from 1 July 2018 to 30 June 2019. The season is widely described as one of the worst campaigns in the club's modern history. It was also the first season since 2008–09 without the club's record goalscorer Cristiano Ronaldo, who departed for Juventus in the summer of 2018, having won 15 trophies altogether since his debut.

== Summary ==
=== Pre-season ===
After Zinedine Zidane's departure, Madrid announced on 12 June 2018, that Julen Lopetegui would take over the head coaching position.

On 22 June 2018, Madrid announced their first signing of the season, adding Andriy Lunin to the squad. On 5 July 2018, Madrid signed Álvaro Odriozola. Five days later, Madrid agreed to sell Cristiano Ronaldo to Juventus for €117 million.

Thibaut Courtois joined Madrid on 8 August 2018 from Chelsea, while Mateo Kovačić moved to Chelsea on loan.

=== August ===
The season started on 15 August, with the 2018 UEFA Super Cup against Atlético Madrid. The game was lost 2–4 after extra time. Karim Benzema and Sergio Ramos gave Madrid the 2–1 lead which was cancelled out late in the second half. It was Real's first European finals loss after nine consecutive wins. The new La Liga season started with a 2–0 victory against Getafe four days later, with goals from Dani Carvajal and Gareth Bale. Against Girona, Madrid came out with a 4–1 victory from behind, with a brace from Benzema and goals from Ramos and Bale. On 29 August 2018, Mariano Díaz returned to Madrid.

=== September ===
On the first day of the new month, a brace from Benzema and goals from Bale and Ramos secured Madrid three points in a 4–1 win over Leganés. The away game at Athletic Bilbao, on 15 September 2018, ended in a 1–1 draw with the lone goal coming from Isco. Four days later, in the first match of the 2018–19 UEFA Champions League group stage, Madrid defeated Roma 3–0 after goals from Bale, Isco and Mariano. Marco Asensio scored the lone goal in a 1–0 win over RCD Espanyol, just three days later. The first defeat of the league season came on 26 September 2018, against Sevilla, with Real losing 0–3. In the first league Madrid derby against Atlético, the match ended in a goalless draw three days later.

=== October ===
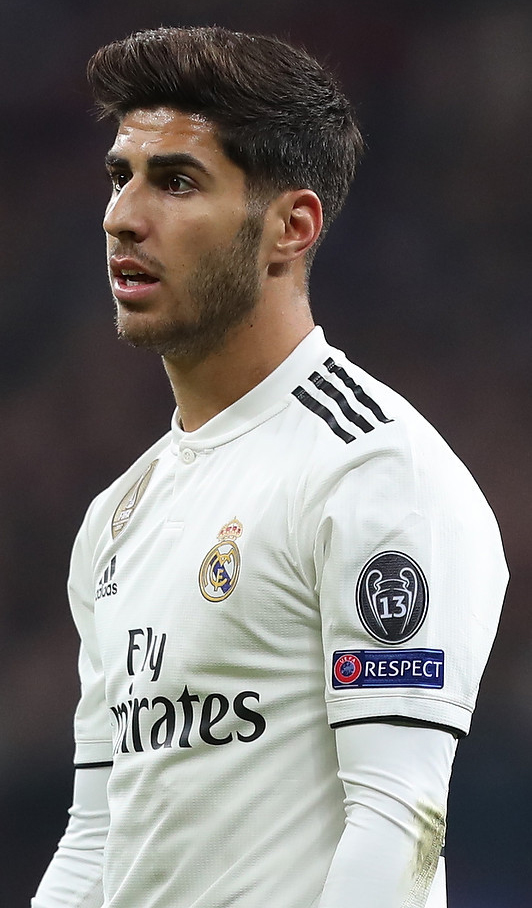
Marco Asensio in an away Champions League group stage game against CSKA Moscow, with the left sleeve of his shirt prominently featuring an updated UCL multiple-winner badge, courtesy of Madrid's triumph in the 2018 edition

On 2 October 2018, the Champions League match at CSKA Moscow ended in a 0–1 loss. Four days later, against Deportivo Alavés, Madrid lost 0–1 again. Their next game was a 1–2 loss against Levante UD on 20 October 2018, with the lone goal coming from Marcelo. The Champions League match against Viktoria Plzeň three days later ended with a 2–1 win with goals from Benzema and Marcelo. Five days later, El Clásico was lost 1–5, with the goal coming from Marcelo. It was Madrid's biggest away defeat to Barcelona since 0–5 in 2010. On 29 October 2018, Lopetegui was sacked and replaced by interim coach Santiago Solari. On the last day of the month, Madrid took on UD Melilla in the Copa del Rey round of 32 first leg and won 4–0 after goals from Benzema, Asensio, Odriozola and Cristo González.

=== November ===
On 3 November 2018, late goals from Vinícius Júnior and Ramos gave Madrid a 2–0 victory over Real Valladolid. Four days later, the return game at Viktoria Plzeň in the Champions League ended with a 5–0 win, Benzema scored a brace and Bale, Casemiro and Toni Kroos each added one goal. Madrid defeated Celta Vigo 4–2 on 11 November 2018, after goals from Benzema, Ramos, Dani Ceballos and an own goal. Solari was upgraded to a full-time head coach on 13 November 2018, after signing a contract through 2021. The away game at SD Eibar on 24 November 2018 was lost 0–3. Three days later, the Champions League match at Roma was won 2–0 by goals from Bale and Lucas Vázquez. With that win, Madrid advanced to the knockout stage.

=== December ===
On the first day of the month, an own goal and a goal from Vázquez secured Madrid three points with a 2–0 win over Valencia CF. The return leg of the Copa del Rey round of 32 tie against Melilla on 6 December 2018 was won 6–1, giving Madrid a 10–1 victory on aggregate. Asensio and Isco scored a brace each, with the remaining goals coming from Vinícius and Javi Sánchez. Three days later, a Bale goal gave Real a 1–0 victory over SD Huesca. On 12 December 2018, Madrid suffered a 0–3 loss against CSKA Moscow on the last matchday of the Champions League group stage. A lone goal by Benzema helped Madrid to win 1–0 against Rayo Vallecano on 15 December 2018. On 19 December 2018, the semi-final of the 2018 FIFA Club World Cup was won 3–1 against Kashima Antlers with a hat-trick from Bale. Three days later, Madrid defeated Al-Ain 4–1 in the final after goals from Luka Modrić, Marcos Llorente, Ramos and an own goal.

=== January ===
In the first game of the new year on 3 January 2019, Madrid drew Villarreal 2–2 with goals from Benzema and Raphaël Varane. Three days later, the match against Real Sociedad was lost 0–2. On 6 January 2019, Madrid announced the signing of Brahim Díaz. Goals from Ramos, Vázquez and Vinícius gave Madrid a 3–0 first leg win against Leganés on 9 January 2019 in the Copa del Rey round of 16. On 13 January 2019, a late goal from Ceballos gave Madrid a 2–1 away win against Real Betis after Modrić scored the other goal. Despite a 0–1 loss in the second leg three days later, an aggregate 3–1 victory over Leganés secured Madrid a place in the quarter-finals of the Copa del Rey. Kiko Casilla joined Leeds United on 17 January 2019. Two days later, Madrid defeated Sevilla 2–0 with goals from Casemiro and Modrić. A brace from Ramos and goals by Vázquez and Benzema helped Madrid to get a 4–2 first leg home victory over Girona in the Copa del Rey quarter-finals of on 24 January. Three days later, Real recorded another 4–2 victory, this time over Espanyol, with two goals from Benzema and goals from Ramos and Bale. On 31 January, Madrid defeated Girona 3–1 away from home to close out the month and progress to the Copa del Rey semi-finals with a 7–3 aggregate victory. Benzema scored a brace and Llorente added another goal.

=== February ===
On 3 February, Madrid won 3–0 against Alavés after goals from Benzema, Vinicius and Mariano. The first leg of the Copa del Rey semi-finals against Barcelona on 6 February ended with a 1–1 draw after Vázquez initially gave Madrid the lead. Three days later, Real won the derby against Atlético 3–1 after goals from Casemiro, Ramos and Bale to move up to the second place. In the first leg of the Champions League round of 16 against AFC Ajax on 13 February, Madrid came away with a 2–1 victory, with Benzema and Asensio scoring the goals. Four days later, Girona defeated Madrid with a score of 2–1, with the lone goal coming from Casemiro. The result meant Atlético had again overtaken Real for the second place. A 2–1 victory over Levante was recorded on 24 February, after goals from Benzema and Bale, both being penalties. Three days later, Madrid was knocked out of the Copa del Rey by Barcelona after a 0–3 second leg defeat, resulting in a 1–4 aggregate loss.

=== March ===
The league Clásico took place on 2 March and was lost 0–1. Three days later, Madrid suffered a 1–4 home defeat in the return leg of the Champions League round of 16 against Ajax and was eliminated 3–5 on aggregate to end their 3–year European reign. On 10 March, the game against Valladolid was won 4–1 after a brace from Benzema and goals from Varane and Modrić. Zidane returned as the head coach the next day while Solari was sacked. On 16 March, Celta Vigo was defeated 2–0 with goals from Isco and Bale. On the last day of the month, goals from Isco, Ceballos and a late one from Benzema secured Madrid three points in a 3–2 win over Huesca.

=== April ===
On 3 April, the away game at Valencia was lost 1–2, with the lone goal coming from Benzema in added time. Three days later, a brace from Benzema secured Madrid a 2–1 win over Eibar. On 15 April, Madrid got a 1–1 draw at Leganés with a goal from Benzema. A hat-trick from Benzema secured Madrid a 3–0 win over Athletic Bilbao on 21 April 2019. On 25 April, Madrid was held to a scoreless draw at Getafe. Three days later, the away game at Vallecano was lost 0–1.

=== May ===
On 5 May, Madrid defeated Villarreal 3–2 with a brace from Mariano and a goal from Jesús Vallejo. A week later, the away game at Real Sociedad was lost 1–3, with the lone goal coming from Brahim Díaz. With that result, Real Madrid was confirmed to finish no higher than third in the league standings. The last game of the season was lost 0–2 at home to Real Betis on 19 May 2019, marking an end to a disastrous campaign. Real finished the season with the worst points total since 2001–02 and worst goal difference since 1999–2000. A day later, Kroos signed a new contract until 2023.

== Players ==
N	Pos.	Nat.	Name	Age	EU	Since	App	Goals	Ends	Transfer fee	Notes
1	GK	(Costa Rica)	Keylor Navas	32	EU	2014	162	0	2020	€10M	
2	DF	(Spain)	Dani Carvajal	27	EU	2013	236	5	2022	€6.5M	Originally from youth system
3	DF	(Spain)	Jesús Vallejo	22	EU	2015	19	1	2021	€6M	
4	DF	(Spain)	Sergio Ramos (captain)	33	EU	2005	606	84	2021	€28M	
5	DF	(France)	Raphaël Varane (3rd VC)	26	EU	2011	276	12	2022	€10M	
6	DF	(Spain)	Nacho	29	EU	2012	190	9	2020	Youth system	
7	FW	(Dominican Republic)	Mariano	25	EU	2018	32	9	2023	€23M	Originally from youth system
8	MF	(Germany)	Toni Kroos	29	EU	2014	233	13	2023	€25M	
9	FW	(France)	Karim Benzema (2nd VC)	31	EU	2009	465	222	2021	€35M	
10	MF	(Croatia)	Luka Modrić	33	EU	2012	294	17	2020	€30M	
11	FW	(Wales)	Gareth Bale	29	EU	2013	226	102	2022	€100.8M	
12	DF	(Brazil)	Marcelo (VC)	31	EU	2007 (Winter)	486	36	2022	€6.5M	
14	MF	(Brazil)	Casemiro	27	Non-EU	2013	192	18	2021	€6M	
15	MF	(Uruguay)	Federico Valverde	20	Non-EU	2016	24	0	2021	€6M	
17	FW	(Spain)	Lucas Vázquez	27	EU	2015	181	21	2021	€1M	Originally from youth system
18	MF	(Spain)	Marcos Llorente	24	EU	2015	39	2	2021	Youth system	
19	DF	(Spain)	Álvaro Odriozola	23	EU	2018	22	1	2024	€30M	
20	MF	(Spain)	Marco Asensio	23	EU	2014	136	27	2023	€3.9M	
21	MF	(Spain)	Brahim Díaz	19	EU	2019	11	1	2025	€17M	
22	MF	(Spain)	Isco	27	EU	2013	278	48	2022	€27M	
23	DF	(Spain)	Sergio Reguilón	22	EU	2018	22	0	2020	Youth system	
24	MF	(Spain)	Dani Ceballos	22	EU	2017	56	5	2024	€16.5M	
25	GK	(Belgium)	Thibaut Courtois	27	EU	2018	34	0	2025	€35M	
28	FW	(Brazil)	Vinícius Júnior	18	Non-EU	2018	31	4	2025	€45M	
30	GK	(France)	Luca Zidane	21	EU	2017	2	0	2021	Youth system	

- Last updated: 19 May 2019
- Source: realmadrid.com
- Ordered by squad number.

== Transfers ==
=== In ===
No.	Pos.	Nat.	Name	Age	EU	Moving from	Type	Transfer window	Ends	Transfer fee	Source
7	FW	(Dominican Republic)	Mariano	25	EU	(France) Lyon	Transfer	Summer	2023	€23M	Real Madrid CF
15	MF	(Uruguay)	Federico Valverde	19	Non-EU	Real Madrid Castilla	Promoted	Summer	2021	Free	
19	DF	(Spain)	Álvaro Odriozola	22	EU	Real Sociedad	Transfer	Summer	2024	€30M	Real Madrid CF
25	GK	(Belgium)	Thibaut Courtois	26	EU	(England) Chelsea	Transfer	Summer	2024	€35M	Real Madrid CF
28	FW	(Brazil)	Vinícius Júnior	18	Non-EU	(Brazil) Flamengo	Transfer	Summer	2023	€45M	Real Madrid CF
	GK	(Ukraine)	Andriy Lunin	19	EU	(Ukraine) Zorya Luhansk	Transfer	Summer	2024	€8.5M	Real Madrid CF
	DF	(Portugal)	Fábio Coentrão	30	EU	(Portugal) Sporting CP	End of Loan	Summer	2019	Free	
	DF	(Austria)	Philipp Lienhart	21	EU	(Germany) SC Freiburg	End of Loan	Summer	2018	Free	
	MF	(Spain)	Omar Mascarell	25	EU	(Germany) Eintracht Frankfurt	Buy-Back clause	Summer	2018	€4M	
	MF	(Norway)	Martin Ødegaard	19	EU	(Netherlands) SC Heerenveen	End of Loan	Summer	2021	Free	
	MF	(Spain)	Lucas Torró	23	EU	Osasuna	Buy-Back clause	Summer	2018	€1.75M	
	FW	(Spain)	Raúl de Tomás	23	EU	Real Madrid Castilla	Promoted	Summer	2023	Free	
21	MF	(Spain)	Brahim Díaz	19	EU	(England) Manchester City	Transfer	Winter	2025	€17M	Real Madrid CF

Total spending: ▼€163.25M

=== Out ===
No.	Pos.	Nat.	Name	Age	EU	Moving to	Type	Transfer window	Transfer fee	Source
7	FW	(Portugal)	Cristiano Ronaldo	33	EU	(Italy) Juventus	Transfer	Summer	€117M	Juventus F.C.
15	DF	(France)	Théo Hernandez	20	EU	Real Sociedad	Loan	Summer	Free	Real Sociedad
19	DF	(Morocco)	Achraf Hakimi	19	EU	(Germany) Borussia Dortmund	Loan	Summer	Free	Borussia Dortmund
21	FW	(Spain)	Borja Mayoral	21	EU	Levante	Loan	Summer	Free	Levante UD
23	MF	(Croatia)	Mateo Kovačić	24	EU	(England) Chelsea	Loan	Summer	Free	Chelsea F.C.
	GK	(Ukraine)	Andriy Lunin	19	EU	Leganés	Loan	Summer	Free	CD Leganés
	DF	(Portugal)	Fábio Coentrão	30	EU	(Portugal) Rio Ave	Released	Summer	Free	Rio Ave F.C.
	DF	(Austria)	Philipp Lienhart	21	EU	(Germany) SC Freiburg	Transfer	Summer	€2M	SC Freiburg
	DF	(Spain)	Álvaro Tejero	21	EU	Albacete	Loan	Summer	Free	Albacete Balompié
	MF	(Spain)	Aleix Febas	22	EU	Albacete	Loan	Summer	Free	Albacete Balompié
	MF	(Spain)	Omar Mascarell	25	EU	(Germany) Schalke 04	Transfer	Summer	€10M	FC Schalke 04
	MF	(Norway)	Martin Ødegaard	19	EU	(Netherlands) Vitesse	Loan	Summer	Free	SBV Vitesse
	MF	(Spain)	Óscar Rodríguez	20	EU	Leganés	Loan	Summer	Free	CD Leganés
	MF	(Spain)	Lucas Torró	23	EU	(Germany) Eintracht Frankfurt	Transfer	Summer	€3.5M	Eintracht Frankfurt
	FW	(Spain)	Raúl de Tomás	23	EU	Rayo Vallecano	Loan	Summer	Free	Rayo Vallecano
	FW	(Paraguay)	Sergio Díaz	20	Non-EU	(Brazil) Corinthians	Loan	Summer	Free	Sport Club Corinthians Paulista
	FW	(Netherlands)	Mink Peeters	20	EU	Lleida	Loan	Summer	Free	Lleida Esportiu
13	GK	(Spain)	Kiko Casilla	32	EU	(England) Leeds United	Transfer	Winter	Free	Leeds United F.C.

Total income: ▲€132.5M Net income: ▼€30.75M

== Pre-season and friendlies ==
31 July 2018 1	Manchester United	2–1	Real Madrid	Miami Gardens, United States
20:05 EDT	Sánchez 18'; Herrera 27'	Report	Benzema 45+3'	Stadium: Hard Rock Stadium; Attendance: 64,141; Referee: Allen Chapman (United States)

4 August 2018 2	Real Madrid	3–1	Juventus	Landover, United States
18:05 EDT	Bale 39'; Asensio 47', 56'; Reguilón (yellow card) 81'	Report	Benatia (yellow card) 6'; Carvajal 12' (o.g.); Alex Sandro (yellow card) 33'	Stadium: FedExField; Attendance: 71,597; Referee: Robert Sibiga (United States)

7 August 2018 3	Real Madrid	2–1	Roma	East Rutherford, United States
20:05 EDT	Asensio 2'; Bale 15'; Ceballos (yellow card) 50'	Report	Strootman 83'	Stadium: MetLife Stadium; Attendance: 51,528; Referee: Mark Geiger (United States)

11 August 2018 4	Real Madrid	3–1	Milan	Madrid, Spain
21:00	Benzema 2'; Bale 45+1'; Mayoral 90+1'	Report	Higuaín 4'	Stadium: Santiago Bernabéu; Attendance: 54,294; Referee: Xavier Estrada Fernández

== Competitions ==
=== Overview ===
Competition	First match	Last match	Starting round	Final position	Record							
Competition	First match	Last match	Starting round	Final position	Pld	W	D	L	GF	GA	GD	Win %
La Liga	19 August 2018	19 May 2019	Matchday 1	Third place	38	21	5	12	63	46	+17	55.26
Copa del Rey	31 October 2018	27 February 2019	Round of 32	Semi-finals	8	5	1	2	21	9	+12	62.50
Champions League	19 September 2018	5 March 2019	Group stage	Round of 16	8	5	0	3	15	10	+5	62.50
UEFA Super Cup	15 August 2018	15 August 2018	Final	Runners-up	1	0	0	1	2	4	−2	0.00
FIFA Club World Cup	19 December 2018	22 December 2018	Semi-finals	Winners	2	2	0	0	7	2	+5	100.00
Total					57	33	6	18	108	71	+37	57.89

Last updated: 19 May 2019
Source: Soccerway

=== La Liga ===
==== League table ====
Pos	Team	Pld	W	D	L	GF	GA	GD	Pts	Qualification or relegation
1	Barcelona (C)	38	26	9	3	90	36	+54	87	Qualification for the Champions League group stage
2	Atlético Madrid	38	22	10	6	55	29	+26	76	Qualification for the Champions League group stage
3	Real Madrid	38	21	5	12	63	46	+17	68	Qualification for the Champions League group stage
4	Valencia	38	15	16	7	51	35	+16	61	Qualification for the Champions League group stage
5	Getafe	38	15	14	9	48	35	+13	59 (Note: Getafe finished ahead of Sevilla on head-to-head points: Sevilla 0–2 Getafe, Getafe 3–0 Sevilla.)	Qualification for the Europa League group stage (Note: Since the winners of the 2018–19 Copa del Rey, Valencia, qualified for European competition based on league position, the spot awarded to the cup winners (Europa League group stage) was passed to the sixth-placed team and the spot awarded to the sixth-placed team (Europa League second qualifying round) was passed to the seventh-placed team.)

Source: La Liga, Soccerway
Rules for classification: 1) Points; 2) Head-to-head points; 3) Head-to-head goal difference; 4) Goal difference; 5) Goals scored; 6) Fair-play points (Note: Head-to-head record is used only after all the matches between the teams in question have been played)
(C) Champions

==== Results summary ====
Overall								Home						Away					
Pld	W	D	L	GF	GA	GD	Pts	W	D	L	GF	GA	GD	W	D	L	GF	GA	GD
38	21	5	12	63	46	+17	68	13	1	5	32	15	+17	8	4	7	31	31	0

Last updated: 19 May 2019.
Source: LaLiga

==== Result round by round ====
Round	1	2	3	4	5	6	7	8	9	10	11	12	13	14	15	16	17	18	19	20	21	22	23	24	25	26	27	28	29	30	31	32	33	34	35	36	37	38
Ground	H	A	H	A	H	A	H	A	H	A	H	A	A	H	A	H	A	H	A	H	A	H	A	H	A	H	A	H	H	A	H	A	H	A	A	H	A	H
Result	W	W	W	D	W	L	D	L	L	L	W	W	L	W	W	W	D	L	W	W	W	W	W	L	W	L	W	W	W	L	W	D	W	D	L	W	L	L
Position	4	1	2	2	2	2	2	4	7	9	6	6	6	5	4	4	4	5	4	3	3	3	2	3	3	3	3	3	3	3	3	3	3	3	3	3	3	3

Source: LaLiga
A = Away; H = Home; W = Win; D = Draw; L = Loss

==== Matches ====
19 August 2018 1	Real Madrid	2–0	Getafe	Madrid
22:15 CEST (UTC+2)	Carvajal 20'; Bale 51'; Marcelo (yellow card) 68'	Report	Molina (yellow card) 27'; Amath (yellow card) 41'; Djené (yellow card) 42'; Mata (yellow card) 63'; Arambarri (yellow card) 77'; Bruno (yellow card) 79'; Cabrera (yellow card) 79'	Stadium: Santiago Bernabéu; Attendance: 48,346; Referee: Xavier Estrada Fernández

26 August 2018 2	Girona	1–4	Real Madrid	Girona
22:15 CEST (UTC+2)	B. García 16'; Porro (yellow card) 33'; Muniesa (yellow card) 65'	Report	Ramos 39' (pen.); Benzema 52' (pen.), 80', (yellow card) 86'; Bale 59'; Carvajal (yellow card) 67'; Vázquez (yellow card) 88'	Stadium: Montilivi; Attendance: 13,383; Referee: Juan Martínez Munuera

1 September 2018 3	Real Madrid	4–1	Leganés	Madrid
20:45 CEST (UTC+2)	Modrić (yellow card) 3'; Bale 17'; Benzema 48', 61'; Ramos 66' (pen.)	Report	Carrillo 24' (pen.); Santos (yellow card) 27'	Stadium: Santiago Bernabéu; Attendance: 59,255; Referee: Santiago Jaime Latre

15 September 2018 4	Athletic Bilbao	1–1	Real Madrid	Bilbao
20:45 CEST (UTC+2)	Muniain 32'; Yeray (yellow card) 45'; D. García (yellow card) 60'; Capa (yellow card) 68'; Berchiche (yellow card) 72'; Beñat (yellow card) 78'; Simón (yellow card) 90+2'	Report	Isco 63'; Carvajal (yellow card) 85'; Vázquez (yellow card) 87'	Stadium: San Mamés; Attendance: 46,551; Referee: José González González

22 September 2018 5	Real Madrid	1–0	Espanyol	Madrid
20:45 CEST (UTC+2)	Nacho (yellow card) 6'; Asensio 41'; Casemiro (yellow card) 77'	Report	Roca (yellow card) 26'; J. López (yellow card) 45'	Stadium: Santiago Bernabéu; Attendance: 68,034; Referee: Antonio Mateu Lahoz

26 September 2018 6	Sevilla	3–0	Real Madrid	Seville
22:00 CEST (UTC+2)	Silva 17', 21'; Vázquez (yellow card) 34'; Ben Yedder 39'; Banega (yellow card) 74'; Sarabia (yellow card) 79'	Report	Bale (yellow card) 27'; Kroos (yellow card) 64'; Modrić (yellow card) 65'; Mariano (yellow card) 87'	Stadium: Ramón Sánchez Pizjuán; Attendance: 40,972; Referee: Alejandro Hernández Hernández

29 September 2018 7	Real Madrid	0–0	Atlético Madrid	Madrid
20:45 CEST (UTC+2)	Carvajal (yellow card) 30'; Ramos (yellow card) 61'; Nacho (yellow card) 90+2'	Report	Juanfran (yellow card) 48'; Lemar (yellow card) 59'; Koke (yellow card) 70'; Correa (yellow card) 90+3'	Stadium: Santiago Bernabéu; Attendance: 78,562; Referee: Juan Martínez Munuera

6 October 2018 8	Alavés	1–0	Real Madrid	Vitoria-Gasteiz
18:30 CEST (UTC+2)	Wakaso (yellow card) 54'; M. García 90+5'	Report		Stadium: Mendizorrotza; Attendance: 17,329; Referee: Santiago Jaime Latre

20 October 2018 9	Real Madrid	1–2	Levante	Madrid
13:00 CEST (UTC+2)	Marcelo 72', (yellow card) 90+4'	Report	Morales 7'; Roger 13' (pen.); Cabaco (yellow card) 53'; Jason (yellow card) 89'	Stadium: Santiago Bernabéu; Attendance: 63,762; Referee: Guillermo Cuadra Fernández

28 October 2018 10	Barcelona	5–1	Real Madrid	Barcelona
16:15 CET (UTC+1)	Coutinho 11'; Suárez 30' (pen.), 75', 83', (yellow card) 77'; Rakitić (yellow card) 38'; Vidal 87'	Report	Nacho (yellow card) 39'; Marcelo 50'; Bale (yellow card) 53'	Stadium: Camp Nou; Attendance: 90,985; Referee: José María Sánchez Martínez

3 November 2018 11	Real Madrid	2–0	Valladolid	Madrid
16:15 CET (UTC+1)	Asensio (yellow card) 45'; Vinícius 83'; Ramos 88' (pen.)	Report		Stadium: Santiago Bernabéu; Attendance: 68,120; Referee: Jesús Gil Manzano

11 November 2018 12	Celta Vigo	2–4	Real Madrid	Vigo
20:45 CET (UTC+1)	Cabral (yellow card) 40' (yellow-red card) 87'; Mallo (yellow card) 41', (goal) 61'; Juncà (yellow card) 44'; Méndez 90+4'	Report	Benzema 23'; Reguilón (yellow card) 37'; Sánchez (yellow card) 53'; Cabral 56' (o.g.); Ramos 83' (pen.); Ceballos 90+1'	Stadium: Abanca-Balaídos; Attendance: 21,184; Referee: Alberto Undiano Mallenco

24 November 2018 13	Eibar	3–0	Real Madrid	Eibar
13:00 CET (UTC+1)	Escalante 16'; Cucurella (yellow card) 33'; Jordán (yellow card) 36'; Enrich 52'; Kike 57'	Report	Bale (yellow card) 44'	Stadium: Ipurua; Attendance: 6,458; Referee: Juan Martínez Munuera

1 December 2018 14	Real Madrid	2–0	Valencia	Madrid
20:45 CET (UTC+1)	Wass 8' (o.g.); Ceballos (yellow card) 71'; Vázquez 83'	Report	Gabriel (yellow card) 6'; Soler (yellow card) 11'; Gayà (yellow card) 20'	Stadium: Santiago Bernabéu; Attendance: 69,653; Referee: José González González

9 December 2018 15	Huesca	0–1	Real Madrid	Huesca
16:15 CET (UTC+1)	Etxeita (yellow card) 42'; Insua (yellow card) 80'	Report	Bale 8'; Carvajal (yellow card) 26'; Ceballos (yellow card) 39'	Stadium: El Alcoraz; Attendance: 7,341; Referee: Mario Melero López

15 December 2018 16	Real Madrid	1–0	Rayo Vallecano	Madrid
18:30 CET (UTC+1)	Benzema 13'	Report	Gálvez (yellow card) 38'; Bebé (yellow card) 63'; Imbula (yellow card) 82'	Stadium: Santiago Bernabéu; Attendance: 55,229; Referee: Ricardo de Burgos Bengoetxea

3 January 2019 17	Villarreal	2–2	Real Madrid	Villarreal
21:30 CET (UTC+1)	Cazorla 4', 82'; Álvaro (yellow card) 45'; Costa (yellow card) 90+1'	Report	Benzema 7'; Varane 20'; Casemiro (yellow card) 41'; Ramos (yellow card) 89'	Stadium: Estadio de la Cerámica; Attendance: 19,903; Referee: Pablo González Fuertes
Note: The match was scheduled for 22 December 2018, but moved because of Madrid's involvement in the 2018 FIFA Club World Cup.

6 January 2019 18	Real Madrid	0–2	Real Sociedad	Madrid
18:30 CET (UTC+1)	Vázquez (yellow card) 40' (yellow-red card) 61'; Marcelo (yellow card) 52'; Modrić (yellow card) 75'; Isco (yellow card) 88'	Report	Willian José 3' (pen.), (yellow card) 36'; Pardo 83'	Stadium: Santiago Bernabéu; Attendance: 53,412; Referee: José Luis Munuera Montero

13 January 2019 19	Real Betis	1–2	Real Madrid	Seville
20:45 CET (UTC+1)	Guardado (yellow card) 4'; Canales 67'; Carvalho (yellow card) 86'	Report	Modrić 13', (yellow card) 35'; Ramos (yellow card) 42'; Valverde (yellow card) 62'; Ceballos 88'	Stadium: Benito Villamarín; Attendance: 52,992; Referee: Alejandro Hernández Hernández

19 January 2019 20	Real Madrid	2–0	Sevilla	Madrid
16:15 CET (UTC+1)	Casemiro (yellow card) 61', (goal) 78'; Ceballos (yellow card) 65'; Modrić 90+2'	Report	Carriço (yellow card) 30'; Banega (yellow card) 54'; Kjær (yellow card) 85'	Stadium: Santiago Bernabéu; Attendance: 68,507; Referee: Antonio Mateu Lahoz

27 January 2019 21	Espanyol	2–4	Real Madrid	Cornellà de Llobregat
20:45 CET (UTC+1)	Roca (yellow card) 7'; Baptistão 25'; García (yellow card) 34'; Rosales 81'; Á. López (yellow card) 85'	Report	Benzema 4', 45'; Ramos 15', (yellow card) 27'; Bale 67'; Varane (red card) 72'; Carvajal (yellow card) 81'; Nacho (yellow card) 88'; Courtois (yellow card) 90+1'	Stadium: RCDE Stadium; Attendance: 20,910; Referee: Jesús Gil Manzano

3 February 2019 22	Real Madrid	3–0	Alavés	Madrid
20:45 CET (UTC+1)	Benzema 30'; Vinícius 80'; Mariano 90+1'	Report	Laguardia (yellow card) 32'; Burgui (yellow card) 54'; Wakaso (yellow card) 74'	Stadium: Santiago Bernabéu; Attendance: 53,132; Referee: Santiago Jaime Latre

9 February 2019 23	Atlético Madrid	1–3	Real Madrid	Madrid
16:15 CET (UTC+1)	Griezmann (yellow card) 24', (goal) 25'; Giménez (yellow card) 41'; Lucas (yellow card) 58'; Partey (yellow card) 62' (yellow-red card) 80'; Morata (yellow card) 68'; Saúl (yellow card) 72'	Report	Casemiro 16'; Vázquez (yellow card) 22'; Ramos 42' (pen.); Reguilón (yellow card) 64'; Modrić (yellow card) 66'; Bale 74'	Stadium: Wanda Metropolitano; Attendance: 67,804; Referee: Xavier Estrada Fernández

17 February 2019 24	Real Madrid	1–2	Girona	Madrid
12:00 CET (UTC+1)	Casemiro 25', (yellow card) 88'; Ramos (yellow card) 64' (yellow-red card) 90'	Report	Lozano (yellow card) 48'; Stuani 65' (pen.); Portu 75'; Alcalá (yellow card) 86'	Stadium: Santiago Bernabéu; Attendance: 68,170; Referee: Guillermo Cuadra Fernández

24 February 2019 25	Levante	1–2	Real Madrid	Valencia
20:45 CET (UTC+1)	Roger (yellow card) 25', (goal) 60'; Rochina (yellow card) 57' (yellow-red card) 88'; López (yellow card) 82'; Luna (yellow card) 84'	Report	Nacho (yellow card) 28' (yellow-red card) 86'; Benzema 43' (pen.); Vázquez (yellow card) 68'; Bale 78' (pen.)	Stadium: Ciutat de València; Attendance: 22,067; Referee: Ignacio Iglesias Villanueva

2 March 2019 26	Real Madrid	0–1	Barcelona	Madrid
20:45 CET (UTC+1)	Ramos (yellow card) 61'; Asensio (yellow card) 82'; Carvajal (yellow card) 89'	Report	Busquets (yellow card) 2'; Rakitić 26'; Lenglet (yellow card) 63'	Stadium: Santiago Bernabéu; Attendance: 78,819; Referee: Alberto Undiano Mallenco

10 March 2019 27	Valladolid	1–4	Real Madrid	Valladolid
20:45 CET (UTC+1)	Anuar 29'; Nacho (yellow card) 61'	Report	Odriozola (yellow card) 12'; Varane 34'; Reguilón (yellow card) 45'; Benzema 51' (pen.), 59'; Courtois (yellow card) 64'; Casemiro (yellow card) 69' (yellow-red card) 80'; Modrić 85'; Marcelo (yellow card) 90+3'	Stadium: José Zorrilla; Attendance: 21,915; Referee: Jesús Gil Manzano

16 March 2019 28	Real Madrid	2–0	Celta Vigo	Madrid
16:15 CET (UTC+1)	Isco 62'; Bale (yellow card) 45', (goal) 77'	Report		Stadium: Santiago Bernabéu; Attendance: 61,971; Referee: Juan Martínez Munuera

31 March 2019 29	Real Madrid	3–2	Huesca	Madrid
20:45 CEST (UTC+2)	Isco 25'; Ceballos 62'; Nacho (yellow card) 66'; Benzema 89'	Report	Hernández 3'; Pulido (yellow card) 48'; Musto (yellow card) 51'; Etxeita 74'; Mantovani (yellow card) 90'	Stadium: Santiago Bernabéu; Attendance: 49,293; Referee: Xavier Estrada Fernández

3 April 2019 30	Valencia	2–1	Real Madrid	Valencia
21:30 CEST (UTC+2)	Wass (yellow card) 5'; Guedes 35'; Parejo (yellow card) 65'; Garay 83'	Report	Odriozola (yellow card) 64'; Marcelo (yellow card) 76'; Benzema 90+3'	Stadium: Mestalla; Attendance: 44,274; Referee: Santiago Jaime Latre

6 April 2019 31	Real Madrid	2–1	Eibar	Madrid
16:15 CEST (UTC+2)	Benzema 59', 81'	Report	Oliveira (yellow card) 21'; Cardona 39'	Stadium: Santiago Bernabéu; Attendance: 50,355; Referee: Pablo González Fuertes

15 April 2019 32	Leganés	1–1	Real Madrid	Leganés
21:00 CEST (UTC+2)	Silva 45'	Report	Carvajal (yellow card) 48'; Benzema 51'; Asensio (yellow card) 61'; Valverde (yellow card) 67'	Stadium: Municipal de Butarque; Attendance: 11,638; Referee: David Medié Jiménez

21 April 2019 33	Real Madrid	3–0	Athletic Bilbao	Madrid
16:15 CEST (UTC+2)	Benzema 47', 76', 90'; Kroos (yellow card) 69'; Navas (yellow card) 82'	Report	Córdoba (yellow card) 3'; Berchiche (yellow card) 15'; R. García (yellow card) 45'; Martínez (yellow card) 53'	Stadium: Santiago Bernabéu; Attendance: 60,566; Referee: Mario Melero López

25 April 2019 34	Getafe	0–0	Real Madrid	Getafe
21:30 CEST (UTC+2)	Suárez (yellow card) 38'	Report	Isco (yellow card) 30'; Valverde (yellow card) 63'; Nacho (yellow card) 82'	Stadium: Coliseum Alfonso Pérez; Attendance: 13,135; Referee: Ricardo de Burgos Bengoetxea

28 April 2019 35	Rayo Vallecano	1–0	Real Madrid	Madrid
20:45 CEST (UTC+2)	Embarba 23' (pen.); Suárez (yellow card) 43'; Uche (yellow card) 90+3'	Report	Vallejo (yellow card) 22'; Modrić (yellow card) 28'; Mariano (yellow card) 62'; Carvajal (yellow card) 79'; Marcelo (yellow card) 86'	Stadium: Vallecas; Attendance: 13,130; Referee: Pablo González Fuertes

5 May 2019 36	Real Madrid	3–2	Villarreal	Madrid
16:15 CEST (UTC+2)	Mariano 2', 49'; Vallejo 40'	Report	Gerard 11'; Funes Mori (yellow card) 43'; Álvaro (yellow card) 84'; Iborra (yellow card) 89'; Costa 90+4'	Stadium: Santiago Bernabéu; Attendance: 46,294; Referee: Jesús Gil Manzano

12 May 2019 37	Real Sociedad	3–1	Real Madrid	San Sebastián
18:30 CEST (UTC+2)	Merino 26'; Zaldúa 57'; Zubeldia (yellow card) 59'; Barrenetxea 67'	Report	Brahim 6'; Vallejo (red card) 39'; Carvajal (yellow card) 42'; Casemiro (yellow card) 75'	Stadium: Anoeta; Attendance: 27,322; Referee: Juan Martínez Munuera

19 May 2019 38	Real Madrid	0–2	Real Betis	Madrid
12:00 CEST (UTC+2)	Llorente (yellow card) 37'; Valverde (yellow card) 49'; Carvajal (yellow card) 58'; Isco (yellow card) 85'	Report	Kaptoum (yellow card) 30'; Loren 61'; Jesé 75'	Stadium: Santiago Bernabéu; Attendance: 56,900; Referee: Alberto Undiano Mallenco

=== Copa del Rey ===
==== Round of 32 ====
31 October 2018 First leg	Melilla	0–4	Real Madrid	Melilla
19:30 CET (UTC+1)	Chakla (yellow card) 11'	Report	Sánchez (yellow card) 10'; Benzema 28'; Asensio 45+1'; Vázquez (yellow card) 72'; Odriozola 79'; González 90+2'	Stadium: Estadio Municipal Álvarez Claro; Attendance: 7,212; Referee: Ricardo de Burgos Bengoetxea

6 December 2018 Second leg	Real Madrid	6–1 (10–1 agg.)	Melilla	Madrid
16:15 CET (UTC+1)	Asensio 33', 35'; Sánchez 39'; Isco 48', 83'; Vinícius 75'	Report	Qasmi 81' (pen.)	Stadium: Santiago Bernabéu; Attendance: 55,243; Referee: Javier Alberola Rojas

==== Round of 16 ====
9 January 2019 First leg	Real Madrid	3–0	Leganés	Madrid
21:30 CET (UTC+1)	Ramos 44' (pen.); Nacho (yellow card) 55'; Vázquez 68'; Vinícius 77'; Valverde (yellow card) 84'	Report	Gumbau (yellow card) 42'; Pérez (yellow card) 90+2'	Stadium: Santiago Bernabéu; Attendance: 44,231; Referee: Jesús Gil Manzano

16 January 2019 Second leg	Leganés	1–0 (1–3 agg.)	Real Madrid	Leganés
21:30 CET (UTC+1)	Braithwaite 30'; Recio (yellow card) 73'	Report	Vinícius (yellow card) 82'; Ceballos (yellow card) 90+1'; Casemiro (yellow card) 90+1'	Stadium: Estadio Municipal de Butarque; Attendance: 9,437; Referee: Juan Martínez Munuera

==== Quarter-finals ====
24 January 2019 First leg	Real Madrid	4–2	Girona	Madrid
21:30 CET (UTC+1)	Vázquez 18'; Nacho (yellow card) 45'; Llorente (yellow card) 66'; Ramos 42' (pen.), 77', (yellow card) 62'; Benzema 80'	Report	Lozano 7'; Alcalá (yellow card) 36'; Granell 66' (pen.)	Stadium: Santiago Bernabéu; Attendance: 50,865; Referee: Alberto Undiano Mallenco

31 January 2019 Second leg	Girona	1–3 (3–7 agg.)	Real Madrid	Girona
21:30 CET (UTC+1)	Stuani (yellow card) 49'; Porro 71'; Lozano (yellow card) 72'	Report	Benzema 27', 43'; Carvajal (yellow card) 65'; Llorente 76'	Stadium: Montilivi; Attendance: 14,158; Referee: Juan Martínez Munuera

==== Semi-finals ====
6 February 2019 First leg	Barcelona	1–1	Real Madrid	Barcelona
21:00 CET (UTC+1)	Semedo (yellow card) 43'; Suárez (yellow card) 56'; Malcom 57'; Alba (yellow card) 58'; Vidal (yellow card) 88'	Report	Vázquez 6'; Ramos (yellow card) 10'; Marcelo (yellow card) 57'	Stadium: Camp Nou; Attendance: 92,008; Referee: Antonio Mateu Lahoz

27 February 2019 Second leg	Real Madrid	0–3 (1–4 agg.)	Barcelona	Madrid
21:00 CET (UTC+1)	Vázquez (yellow card) 58'; Casemiro (yellow card) 72'	Report	Suárez 50', 73' (pen.); Busquets (yellow card) 65'; Varane 69' (o.g.); Semedo (yellow card) 81'	Stadium: Santiago Bernabéu; Attendance: 80,472; Referee: José María Sánchez Martínez

=== UEFA Champions League ===
Madrid joined the competition in the group stage.

==== Group stage ====
Pos	Team	Pld	W	D	L	GF	GA	GD	Pts	Qualification	RMA	ROM	PLZ	CSKA
1	(Spain) Real Madrid	6	4	0	2	12	5	+7	12	Advance to knockout phase	—	3–0	2–1	0–3
2	(Italy) Roma	6	3	0	3	11	8	+3	9	Advance to knockout phase	0–2	—	5–0	3–0
3	(Czech Republic) Viktoria Plzeň	6	2	1	3	7	16	−9	7 (Note: Head-to-head points: Viktoria Plzeň 4, CSKA Moscow 1.)	Transfer to Europa League	0–5	2–1	—	2–2
4	(Russia) CSKA Moscow	6	2	1	3	8	9	−1	7		1–0	1–2	1–2	—

Source: UEFA
Rules for classification: Group stage tiebreakers
Notes:

19 September 2018 1	Real Madrid (Spain)	3–0	(Italy) Roma	Madrid, Spain
21:00 CEST (UTC+2)	Ramos (yellow card) 23'; Isco 45'; Bale 58'; Mariano 90+1'	Report	De Rossi (yellow card) 44'; Džeko (yellow card) 76'	Stadium: Santiago Bernabéu; Attendance: 69,251; Referee: Björn Kuipers (Netherlands)

2 October 2018 2	CSKA Moscow (Russia)	1–0	(Spain) Real Madrid	Moscow, Russia
22:00 (UTC+3)	Vlašić 2'; Bijol (yellow card) 66'; Oblyakov (yellow card) 90+3'; Akinfeev (yellow card) 90+5' (yellow-red card) 90+5'	Report		Stadium: Luzhniki Stadium; Attendance: 71,811; Referee: Ovidiu Haţegan (Romania)

23 October 2018 3	Real Madrid (Spain)	2–1	(Czech Republic) Viktoria Plzeň	Madrid, Spain
21:00 CEST (UTC+2)	Benzema 11'; Isco (yellow card) 32'; Marcelo 55'; Kroos (yellow card) 59'; Ramos (yellow card) 90+4'	Report	Limberský (yellow card) 27'; Hrošovský 78'	Stadium: Santiago Bernabéu; Attendance: 67,356; Referee: Orel Grinfeld (Israel)

7 November 2018 4	Viktoria Plzeň (Czech Republic)	0–5	(Spain) Real Madrid	Plzeň, Czech Republic
21:00 CET (UTC+1)		Report	Benzema 21', 37'; Casemiro 23'; Bale 40'; Nacho (yellow card) 53'; Kroos 67'	Stadium: Doosan Arena; Attendance: 11,483; Referee: Deniz Aytekin (Germany)

27 November 2018 5	Roma (Italy)	0–2	(Spain) Real Madrid	Rome, Italy
21:00 CET (UTC+1)	Zaniolo (yellow card) 42'	Report	Modrić (yellow card) 21'; Bale 47'; Vázquez 59'; Varane (yellow card) 90+4'	Stadium: Stadio Olimpico; Attendance: 59,124; Referee: Clément Turpin (France)

12 December 2018 6	Real Madrid (Spain)	0–3	(Russia) CSKA Moscow	Madrid, Spain
18:55 CET (UTC+1)	Valverde (yellow card) 90+3'	Report	Chalov 37'; Shchennikov 43', (yellow card) 78'; Sigurðsson 73'	Stadium: Santiago Bernabéu; Attendance: 51,636; Referee: Artur Soares Dias (Portugal)

==== Knockout stage ====
===== Round of 16 =====
13 February 2019 First leg	Ajax (Netherlands)	1–2	(Spain) Real Madrid	Amsterdam, Netherlands
21:00 CET (UTC+1)	Ziyech (yellow card) 53', (goal) 75'	Report	Benzema 60'; Reguilón (yellow card) 70'; Vázquez (yellow card) 83'; Asensio 87'; Ramos (yellow card) 90'	Stadium: Johan Cruyff Arena; Attendance: 52,286; Referee: Damir Skomina (Slovenia)

5 March 2019 Second leg	Real Madrid (Spain)	1–4 (3–5 agg.)	(Netherlands) Ajax	Madrid, Spain
21:00 CET (UTC+1)	Carvajal (yellow card) 30'; Asensio 70'; Nacho (yellow card) 90+3' (yellow-red card) 90+3'	Report	Ziyech 7'; Neres 18'; Mazraoui (yellow card) 26'; Tadić 62'; Schöne 72'	Stadium: Santiago Bernabéu; Attendance: 77,013; Referee: Felix Brych (Germany)

=== UEFA Super Cup ===
15 August 2018	Real Madrid (Spain)	2–4 (a.e.t.)	(Spain) Atlético Madrid	Tallinn, Estonia
21:00 CEST (UTC+2)	Benzema 27'; Asensio (yellow card) 35'; Marcelo (yellow card) 54'; Ramos 63' (pen.), (yellow card) 112'; Ceballos (yellow card) 90+1'; Modrić (yellow card) 101'	Report	Costa 1', 79', (yellow card) 62'; Correa (yellow card) 60'; Saúl 98'; Koke 104'; Vitolo (yellow card) 105+3'	Stadium: A. Le Coq Arena; Attendance: 12,424; Referee: Szymon Marciniak (Poland)

=== FIFA Club World Cup ===
Madrid joined the competition in the semi-finals.

19 December 2018 Semifinals	Kashima Antlers (Japan)	1–3	(Spain) Real Madrid	Abu Dhabi, United Arab Emirates
20:30 (UTC+4)	Yamamoto (yellow card) 52'; Doi 78'	Report	Carvajal (yellow card) 42'; Bale 44', 53', 55'	Stadium: Zayed Sports City Stadium; Attendance: 30,554; Referee: Wilton Sampaio (Brazil)

22 December 2018 Final	Real Madrid (Spain)	4–1	(United Arab Emirates) Al-Ain	Abu Dhabi, United Arab Emirates
20:30 (UTC+4)	Modrić 14'; Ramos (yellow card) 45', (goal) 79'; Llorente 60'; Nader 90+1' (o.g.)	Report	Shiotani 86'	Stadium: Zayed Sports City Stadium; Attendance: 40,696; Referee: Jair Marrufo (United States)

== Statistics ==
=== Squad statistics ===
No.	Pos	Nat	Player	Total		La Liga		Copa del Rey		Champions League		Super Cup		Club World Cup	
No.	Pos	Nat	Player	Apps	Goals	Apps	Goals	Apps	Goals	Apps	Goals	Apps	Goals	Apps	Goals
1	GK	(Costa Rica)	Keylor Navas	21	0	10	0	7	0	3	0	1	0	0	0
2	DF	(Spain)	Dani Carvajal	37	1	24	1	4	0	6	0	1	0	2	0
3	DF	(Spain)	Jesús Vallejo	7	1	5	1	1	0	1	0	0	0	0	0
4	DF	(Spain)	Sergio Ramos	42	11	28	6	6	3	5	0	1	1	2	1
5	DF	(France)	Raphaël Varane	43	2	32	2	4	0	4	0	1	0	2	0
6	DF	(Spain)	Nacho	30	0	20	0	5	0	5	0	0	0	0	0
7	FW	(Dominican Republic)	Mariano	17	4	13	3	1	0	3	1	0	0	0	0
8	MF	(Germany)	Toni Kroos	43	1	28	0	4	0	8	1	1	0	2	0
9	FW	(France)	Karim Benzema	53	30	36	21	6	4	8	4	1	1	2	0
10	MF	(Croatia)	Luka Modrić	46	4	34	3	3	0	6	0	1	0	2	1
11	FW	(Wales)	Gareth Bale	42	14	29	8	3	0	7	3	1	0	2	3
12	DF	(Brazil)	Marcelo	34	3	23	2	4	0	4	1	1	0	2	0
13	GK	(Spain)	Kiko Casilla^{‡}	0	0	0	0	0	0	0	0	0	0	0	0
14	MF	(Brazil)	Casemiro	43	4	29	3	5	0	6	1	1	0	2	0
15	MF	(Uruguay)	Federico Valverde	25	0	16	0	5	0	4	0	0	0	0	0
17	FW	(Spain)	Lucas Vázquez	47	5	31	1	7	3	6	1	1	0	2	0
18	MF	(Spain)	Marcos Llorente	16	2	7	0	5	1	2	0	0	0	2	1
19	DF	(Spain)	Álvaro Odriozola	22	1	14	0	5	1	3	0	0	0	0	0
20	MF	(Spain)	Marco Asensio	44	6	30	1	5	3	7	2	1	0	1	0
21	MF	(Spain)	Brahim Díaz	11	1	9	1	2	0	0	0	0	0	0	0
22	MF	(Spain)	Isco	37	6	27	3	4	2	4	1	1	0	1	0
23	DF	(Spain)	Sergio Reguilón	22	0	14	0	4	0	4	0	0	0	0	0
24	MF	(Spain)	Dani Ceballos	34	3	23	3	6	0	3	0	1	0	1	0
25	GK	(Belgium)	Thibaut Courtois	35	0	27	0	1	0	5	0	0	0	2	0
27	FW	(Spain)	Cristo González	4	1	1	0	3	1	0	0	0	0	0	0
28	FW	(Brazil)	Vinícius Júnior	31	4	18	2	8	2	4	0	0	0	1	0
30	GK	(France)	Luca Zidane	1	0	1	0	0	0	0	0	0	0	0	0
31	DF	(Spain)	Javi Sánchez	5	1	1	0	2	1	2	0	0	0	0	0
36	MF	(Spain)	Álvaro Fidalgo	1	0	0	0	1	0	0	0	0	0	0	0
37	DF	(Spain)	Fran García	1	0	0	0	1	0	0	0	0	0	0	0

Last updated: 19 May 2019
Source: Soccerway

- ^{‡} Players who left the club mid-season.

=== Goals ===
Rank	Player	Position	La Liga	Copa del Rey	UEFA CL	Other^{1}	Total
1	(France) Karim Benzema	FW	21	4	4	1	30
2	(Wales) Gareth Bale	FW	8	0	3	3	14
3	(Spain) Sergio Ramos	DF	6	3	0	2	11
4	(Spain) Marco Asensio	MF	1	3	2	0	6
4	(Spain) Isco	MF	3	2	1	0	6
6	(Spain) Lucas Vázquez	FW	1	3	1	0	5
7	(Brazil) Casemiro	MF	3	0	1	0	4
7	(Dominican Republic) Mariano	FW	3	0	1	0	4
7	(Croatia) Luka Modrić	MF	3	0	0	1	4
7	(Brazil) Vinícius Júnior	FW	2	2	0	0	4
11	(Spain) Dani Ceballos	MF	3	0	0	0	3
11	(Brazil) Marcelo	DF	2	0	1	0	3
13	(Spain) Marcos Llorente	MF	0	1	0	1	2
13	(France) Raphaël Varane	DF	2	0	0	0	2
15	(Spain) Dani Carvajal	DF	1	0	0	0	1
15	(Spain) Cristo González	FW	0	1	0	0	1
15	(Spain) Brahim Díaz	FW	1	0	0	0	1
15	(Germany) Toni Kroos	MF	0	0	1	0	1
15	(Spain) Álvaro Odriozola	DF	0	1	0	0	1
15	(Spain) Javi Sánchez	DF	0	1	0	0	1
15	(Spain) Jesús Vallejo	DF	1	0	0	0	1
Own goals			2	0	0	1	3
Total			63	21	15	9	108

^{1} Includes 2018 UEFA Super Cup and 2018 FIFA Club World Cup.

=== Clean sheets ===
Rank	Name	La Liga	Copa del Rey	UEFA CL	Other^{1}	Total
1	(Belgium) Thibaut Courtois	8	0	2	0	10
2	(Costa Rica) Keylor Navas	4	2	1	0	7
3	(France) Luca Zidane	0	0	0	0	0
Total		12	2	3	0	17

^{1} Includes 2018 UEFA Super Cup and 2018 FIFA Club World Cup.

=== Disciplinary record ===
N	P	Nat.	Name	La Liga			Copa del Rey			UEFA CL			Other^{1}			Total			Notes
N	P	Nat.	Name	Yellow card	Second yellow card	Red card	Yellow card	Second yellow card	Red card	Yellow card	Second yellow card	Red card	Yellow card	Second yellow card	Red card	Yellow card	Second yellow card	Red card	Notes
3	DF	(Spain)	Jesús Vallejo	1		1										1		1	
5	DF	(France)	Raphaël Varane			1				1						1		1	
6	DF	(Spain)	Nacho	6	1		2			1	1					9	2		
2	DF	(Spain)	Dani Carvajal	10			1				1		1			12	1		
4	DF	(Spain)	Sergio Ramos	5	1		2			3			2			12	1		
14	MF	(Brazil)	Casemiro	5	1		2									7	1		
17	FW	(Spain)	Lucas Vázquez	4	1		2			1						7	1		
12	DF	(Brazil)	Marcelo	6			1						1			8			
10	MF	(Croatia)	Luka Modrić	6						1						7			
15	MF	(Uruguay)	Federico Valverde	4			1			1						6			
20	MF	(Spain)	Marco Asensio	3									1			4			
22	MF	(Spain)	Isco	3						1						4			
23	DF	(Spain)	Sergio Reguilón	3						1						4			
24	MF	(Spain)	Dani Ceballos	3									1			4			
8	MF	(Germany)	Toni Kroos	2						1						3			
11	FW	(Wales)	Gareth Bale	3												3			
19	DF	(Spain)	Álvaro Odriozola	2												2			
25	GK	(Belgium)	Thibaut Courtois	2												2			
31	DF	(Spain)	Javi Sánchez	1			1									2			
1	GK	(Costa Rica)	Keylor Navas	1												1			
7	FW	(Dominican Republic)	Mariano	1												1			
9	FW	(France)	Karim Benzema	1												1			
11	FW	(Wales)	Gareth Bale	1												1			
18	MF	(Spain)	Marcos Llorente	1												1			
28	FW	(Brazil)	Vinícius Júnior				1									1			

Last updated: 19 May 2019
Source: Soccerway
Ordered by (red card) , (second yellow card) and (yellow card)
(yellow card) = Number of bookings; (second yellow card) = Number of sending offs after a second yellow card; (red card) = Number of sending offs by a direct red card.

^{1} Includes 2018 UEFA Super Cup and 2018 FIFA Club World Cup.
