= Javi Sánchez (footballer) =

Spanish footballer

Personal information
- Full name: Javier Sánchez de Felipe
- Date of birth: 14 March 1997 (age 29)
- Place of birth: Getafe, Spain
- Height: 1.89 m (6 ft 2 in)
- Position: Centre-back

Team information
- Current team: Arouca
- Number: 15

Youth career
- 2003–2005: Atlético Hispanidad
- 2005–2016: Real Madrid

Senior career*
Years	Team	Apps	(Gls)
2015–2019	Real Madrid B	68	(8)
2018–2020	Real Madrid	1	(0)
2019–2020	→ Valladolid (loan)	8	(0)
2020–2026	Valladolid	109	(5)
2026–	Arouca	22	(0)

International career
2015	Spain U19	1	(0)
- * Club domestic league appearances and goals as of 22:33, 11 October 2026 (UTC)

Javier Sánchez de Felipe (born 14 March 1997) is a Spanish professional footballer who plays as a centre-back for Primeira Liga club Arouca.

== Club career ==
=== Real Madrid ===
Born in the Madrid outskirts of Getafe, Sánchez finished his development at Real Madrid after joining the club's academy at the age of 8. He made his senior debut with the reserve team in the Segunda División B, his first match occurring on 10 October 2015 in a 1–0 home win against Arenas Club de Getxo when he was still a junior.

Sánchez scored his first goal for Castilla and in the third division on 3 December 2016, in a 1–1 home draw to CDA Navalcarnero. In the summer of 2018, he was selected by first-team manager Julen Lopetegui for the United States pre-season tour.

Sánchez's maiden competitive appearance with Real Madrid took place on 31 October 2018 which also marked new coach Santiago Solari's debut, and the former featured the entire 4–0 victory at UD Melilla in that season's Copa del Rey. He first appeared in the UEFA Champions League one week later, coming on as a 59th-minute substitute for Sergio Ramos in the 5–0 group stage away rout of FC Viktoria Plzeň. His first La Liga game was on the 11th, when he replaced fellow youth graduate Sergio Reguilón at the end of the first half of an eventual 4–2 defeat of RC Celta de Vigo at Balaídos. He scored his first goal still in that year, contributing to the 6–1 home win against Melilla in the Spanish Cup return leg.

=== Valladolid ===
On 27 July 2019, Sánchez was loaned out to fellow top-tier side Real Valladolid in a season-long deal. The move was made permanent on 16 June 2020, with the player signing a contract until 2024.

After winning promotion from the Segunda División as runners-up, Sánchez scored his first goal in the top flight on 5 November 2022, opening the 2–1 home defeat of Elche CF. After the club was relegated again, he all but missed the 2023–24 campaign due to a knee injury.

Sánchez terminated his contract in January 2026.

=== Arouca ===
On 5 January 2026, Sánchez joined Primeira Liga club F.C. Arouca on a deal until the end of the season, with an option to extend a further year.

== Style of play ==
Sánchez is ambidextrous. He is also technically gifted.

== Career statistics ==
As of match played 4 June 2023

Appearances and goals by club, season and competition
Club	Season	League			Copa del Rey		Europe		Other		Total	
Club	Season	Division	Apps	Goals	Apps	Goals	Apps	Goals	Apps	Goals	Apps	Goals
Real Madrid B	2014–15	Segunda División B	0	0	0	0	3 (Note: Appearances in UEFA Youth League)	0	—		3	0
Real Madrid B	2015–16	Segunda División B	1	0	0	0	4	0	—		5	0
Real Madrid B	2016–17	Segunda División B	13	2	0	0	0	0	—		13	2
Real Madrid B	2017–18	Segunda División B	30	3	0	0	0	0	—		30	3
Real Madrid B	2018–19	Segunda División B	24	3	0	0	0	0	2 (Note: Appearances in Segunda División B play-offs)	0	26	3
Real Madrid B	Total		68	8	0	0	7	0	2	0	77	8
Real Madrid	2018–19	La Liga	1	0	2	1	2	0	0	0	5	1
Valladolid (loan)	2019–20	La Liga	8	0	1	0	—		—		9	0
Valladolid	2020–21	La Liga	16	0	2	0	—		—		18	0
Valladolid	2021–22	Segunda División	28	2	0	0	—		—		28	2
Valladolid	2022–23	La Liga	32	1	2	0	—		—		34	1
Valladolid	Total		84	3	5	0	—		—		89	3
Career total			153	11	7	1	9	0	2	0	171	12
