= Marco Asensio =

Spanish footballer (born 1996)

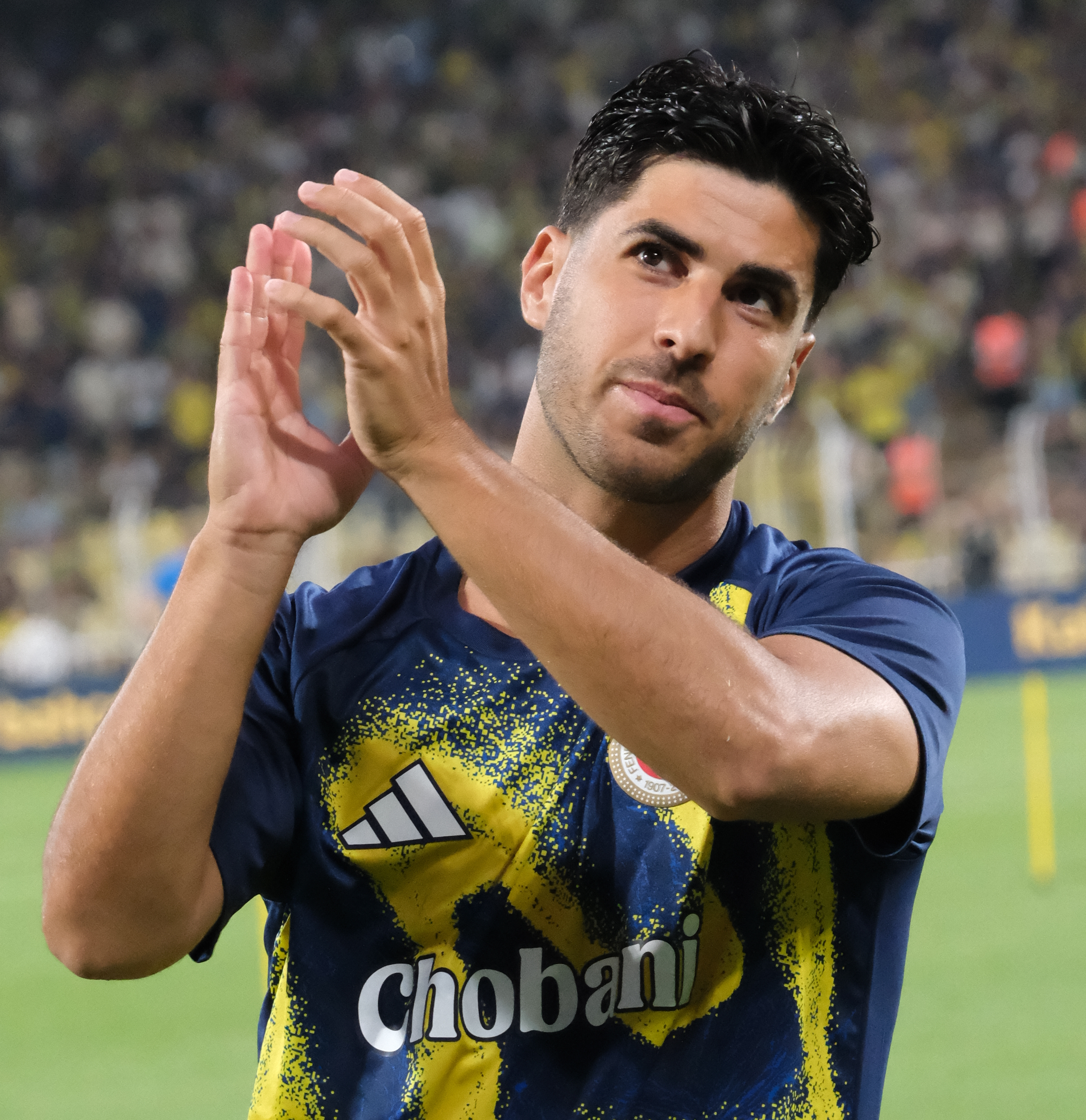
- Asensio playing for Fenerbahçe in 2026

Personal information
- Full name: Marco Asensio Willemsen
- Date of birth: 21 January 1996 (age 30)
- Place of birth: Palma, Spain
- Height: 1.82 m (6 ft 0 in)
- Positions: Winger; attacking midfielder

Team information
- Current team: Fenerbahçe
- Number: 10

Youth career
- 2003–2006: Platges de Calvià
- 2006–2013: Mallorca

Senior career*
Years	Team	Apps	(Gls)
2013–2014	Mallorca B	15	(3)
2013–2014	Mallorca	37	(4)
2014–2023	Real Madrid	191	(37)
2014–2015	→ Mallorca (loan)	19	(3)
2015–2016	→ Espanyol (loan)	34	(4)
2023–2025	Paris Saint-Germain	31	(6)
2025	→ Aston Villa (loan)	13	(3)
2025–	Fenerbahçe	28	(13)

International career
2012	Spain U16	2	(0)
2014–2015	Spain U19	12	(8)
2015–2017	Spain U21	18	(7)
2021	Spain Olympic	7	(1)
2016–2023	Spain	38	(2)
Medal record
Men's football
Representing Spain
UEFA Nations League
Winner	2023 Netherlands	Team
Olympic Games
Silver medal – second place	2020 Tokyo	Team
UEFA European Under-21 Championship
Runner-up	2017 Poland	Team
UEFA European Under-19 Championship
Winner	2015 Greece	Team
- * Club domestic league appearances and goals as of 10 October 2026

Marco Asensio Willemsen (Spanish: [ˈmaɾko aˈsensjo]; born 21 January 1996) is a Spanish professional footballer who plays as a winger or attacking midfielder for Süper Lig club Fenerbahçe.

After starting his career with Mallorca, Asensio signed for Real Madrid in November 2014, being consecutively loaned to his former club as well as Espanyol. With Real Madrid, he went on to win several honours, including three Champions League and three La Liga trophies. In 2023, he joined French club Paris Saint-Germain. Following a one-season loan stint in the Premier League with Aston Villa in 2025, Asensio then transferred to Turkish club Fenerbahçe.

Asensio made his senior debut for Spain in 2016, representing them at the 2018 and 2022 FIFA World Cup.

== Early life ==
Born in Palma, Majorca, Balearic Islands, to a Dutch mother and a Spanish father, Asensio joined Mallorca in 2006 from Platges de Calvià. His mother, Maria Willemsen, died of cancer when he was 15. Asensio struggled with growth deficiencies in his knees during his youth, which only subsided when he was a teenager.

== Club career ==
=== Mallorca ===
After being scouted by Real Madrid and Barcelona, Asensio made his senior debut with Mallorca's reserves in the 2013–14 season in the Tercera División; despite still being a junior; he made his first competitive appearance for the first team on 27 October 2013, playing the last six minutes in a 1–3 away loss against Recreativo de Huelva in the Segunda División.

Again from the bench, Asensio played the last six minutes in a 0–0 home draw against Lugo. After impressing in his first games, he was promoted to the first team by manager José Luis Oltra. Asensio scored his first professional goal on 16 March 2014, netting the first in a 2–0 home win over Tenerife. The next season he was made a starter under new coach Valeri Karpin, scoring against Osasuna, Deportivo Alavés, and Llagostera within a month.

=== Real Madrid ===
On 24 November 2014, Real Madrid reached an agreement in principle to sign 18-year-old Asensio. On 5 December the deal was officially announced, with the player (who had been a supporter of the club as a child) signing a six-year deal for a €3.9 million fee and remaining with the Bermellones on loan until the end of the campaign. According to Real Madrid president Florentino Pérez, Spanish tennis player Rafael Nadal played a crucial role in the transfer of Marco Asensio to Real Madrid.

==== 2015–16 season: Loan to Espanyol ====
On 20 August 2015, after making the whole pre-season with Real Madrid, Asensio was loaned to Espanyol in La Liga. He played his first game in the competition on 19 September, featuring 86 minutes in a 3–2 success at Real Sociedad, and he ended his spell at the Estadi Cornellà-El Prat with 12 overall assists.

==== 2016–17 season: Return to Real Madrid ====
Returning to the Santiago Bernabéu Stadium for 2016–17, Asensio was now a full international. His first competitive appearance took place on 9 August, as he played the full 120 minutes and scored a 25-meter effort in a 3–2 win against fellow Spaniards Sevilla in the UEFA Super Cup. He made his first league start 12 days later, netting the second goal in a 3–0 success at Real Sociedad.

Asensio featured 23 times over his first season, scoring three times as the club won the national championship for the first time since 2012. He added as many goals in that year's UEFA Champions League, including one in the final against Juventus (4–1) to give the Spaniards their 12th title in the latter competition.

==== 2017–18 season ====
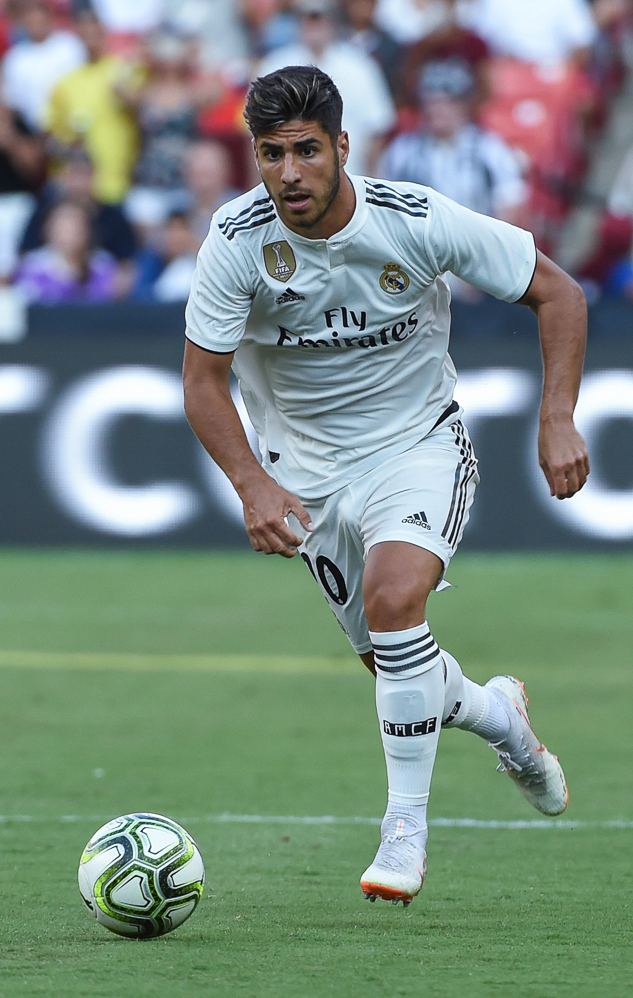
Asensio playing for Real Madrid against Juventus in 2018

Asensio scored his first goal of the 2017–18 season with a 25-yard finish in a 3–1 win over Barcelona at the Camp Nou, for the Supercopa de España, He repeated the feat with a similarly spectacular effort in the second leg, in a 5–1 aggregate triumph.

On 28 September 2017, Asensio extended his contract until 2023. On 18 February 2018, in a match where he contributed with a brace to a 5–3 away win over Real Betis, he scored Real Madrid's 6,000th goal in the Spanish top division. Asensio made 11 appearances while scoring one goal during the 2017–18 Champions League, and the club won its third consecutive and 13th overall title in the competition.

==== 2019–2023: Final seasons ====
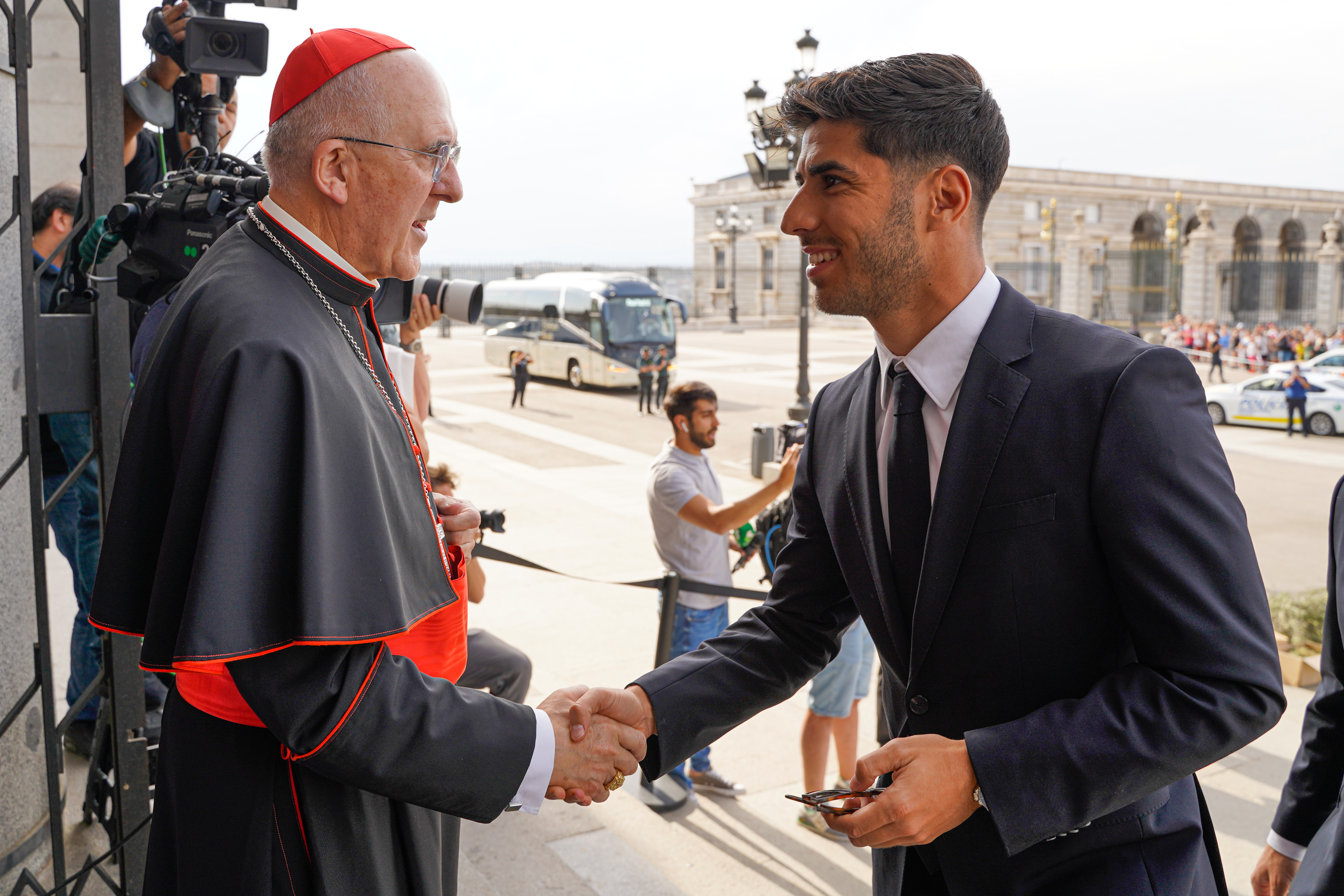
Asensio in trophy presentation ceremony at Virgin of Almudena in 2022

On 24 July 2019, during a preseason match against Arsenal, he tore his ACL. On 19 June 2020, in a 3–0 win over Valencia, he came on for Federico Valverde in the 74th minute, scored the second goal with his first touch, and provided the assist to Karim Benzema for the third goal. He returned for the final stretch of the season, scoring three goals in nine games, as Real Madrid won the 2019–20 La Liga. On 22 September 2021, he scored his first senior hat-trick against his former club Mallorca, which ended in a 6–1 victory.

On 28 May 2022, Asensio was on the bench against Liverpool in the UEFA Champions League Final as Real Madrid went on to win their 14th UEFA Champions League title. Asensio ended the 2021–22 season with 10 goals in 30 La Liga games. He also won the 2021–22 La Liga with his club Real Madrid. On 3 June 2023, Real Madrid confirmed that Asensio would be departing upon the expiry of his contract, thus becoming a free agent.

=== Paris Saint-Germain ===
On 6 July 2023, Ligue 1 club Paris Saint-Germain (PSG) announced the signing of Asensio, with a contract running until June 2026. He made his debut in a 0–0 draw against Lorient at the Parc des Princes on 12 August. Two weeks later, in his second match for the club, Asensio scored his first PSG goal, the opener in a 3–1 home win over Lens. In the following match away to Lyon on 3 September, he scored another goal and provided the assist for Kylian Mbappé's second in a 4–1 victory for Les Parisiens.

==== Loan to Aston Villa ====
On 3 February 2025, Premier League side Aston Villa announced the loan signing of Asensio until the end of the season. He made his debut on 9 February, coming on as a substitute in a 2–1 FA Cup victory against Tottenham Hotspur. On 22 February 2025, he scored his first two goals for Villa to give them a 2–1 comeback win over Chelsea in the league.

=== Fenerbahçe ===
On 1 September 2025, Asensio signed for Turkish Süper Lig club Fenerbahçe on a three-year contract with an option for a further year. A transfer fee of €8.5 million was reported in the media. On 14 September, he made his debut with the team in a 1–0 league victory over Trabzonspor. On 21 September, he scored his first goal for the club against Kasımpaşa. On 24 September, he made his UEFA Europa League debut against Dinamo Zagreb. On 2 November, Asensio scored in the derby against Beşiktaş, helping his side to a 3–2 win. On 23 November, he scored a brace against Çaykur Rizespor in a 5–2 league win. The goals against Çaykur Rizespor meant he had scored in five consecutive matches, a first in Asensio's career. On 14 February 2026, Asensio scored his 10th Süper Lig goal in a crucial match against Trabzonspor, helping Fenerbahçe secure a 3–2 away win.

== International career ==
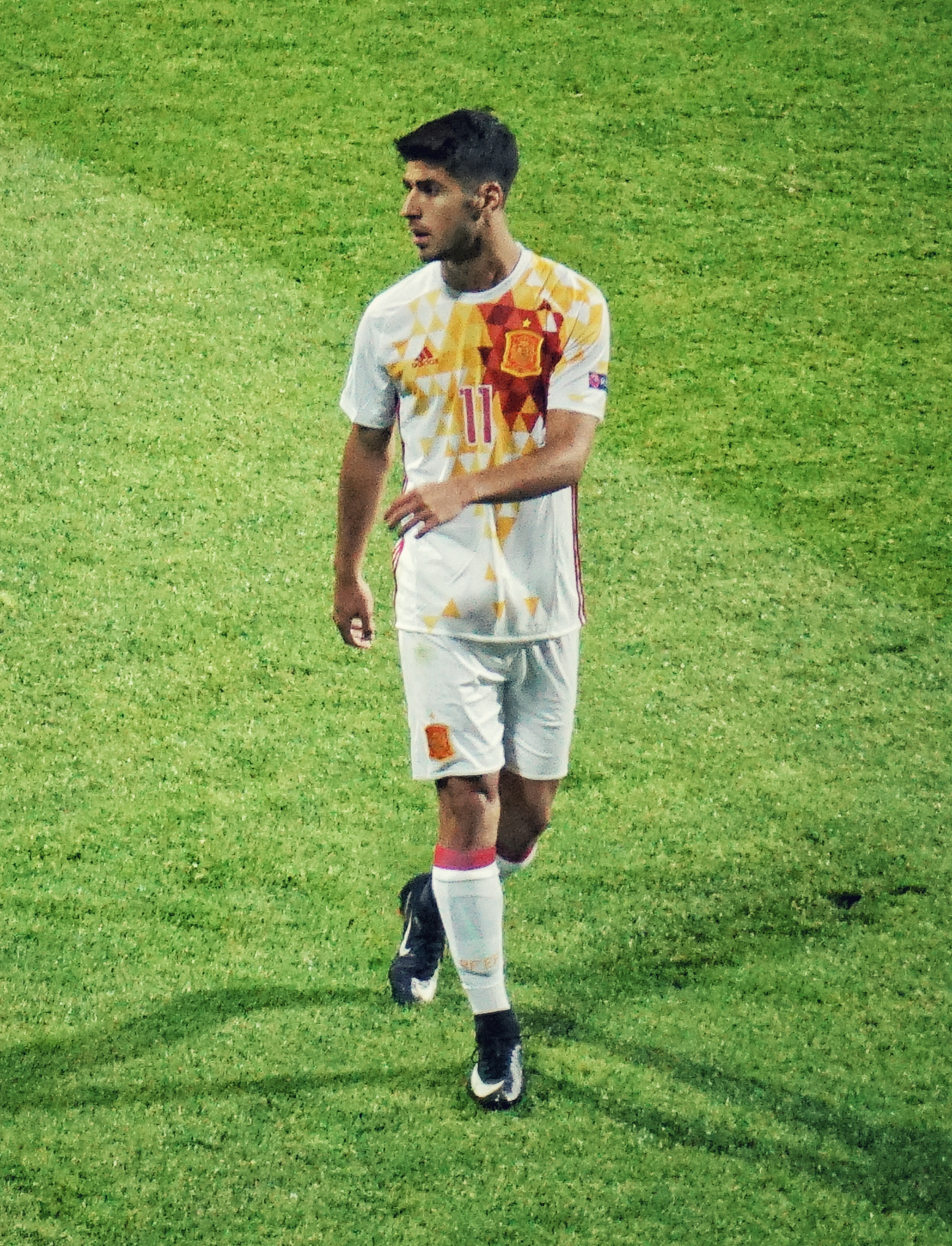
Asensio during a 2017 European Under-21 Championship match against Portugal

Being of both Dutch and Spanish descent, he chose to represent Spain, despite receiving an invitation from the Royal Dutch Football Association. After being a regular for Spain at youth level, Asensio made his debut for the under-21 team on 26 March 2015, coming on as a late substitute for goalscorer Gerard Deulofeu in a 2–0 friendly win over Norway in Cartagena. In July, he was part of the victorious under-19 side at the UEFA European Championship in Greece, where he scored both goals in a semi-final victory over France in Katerini, in the 88th minute and in added time.

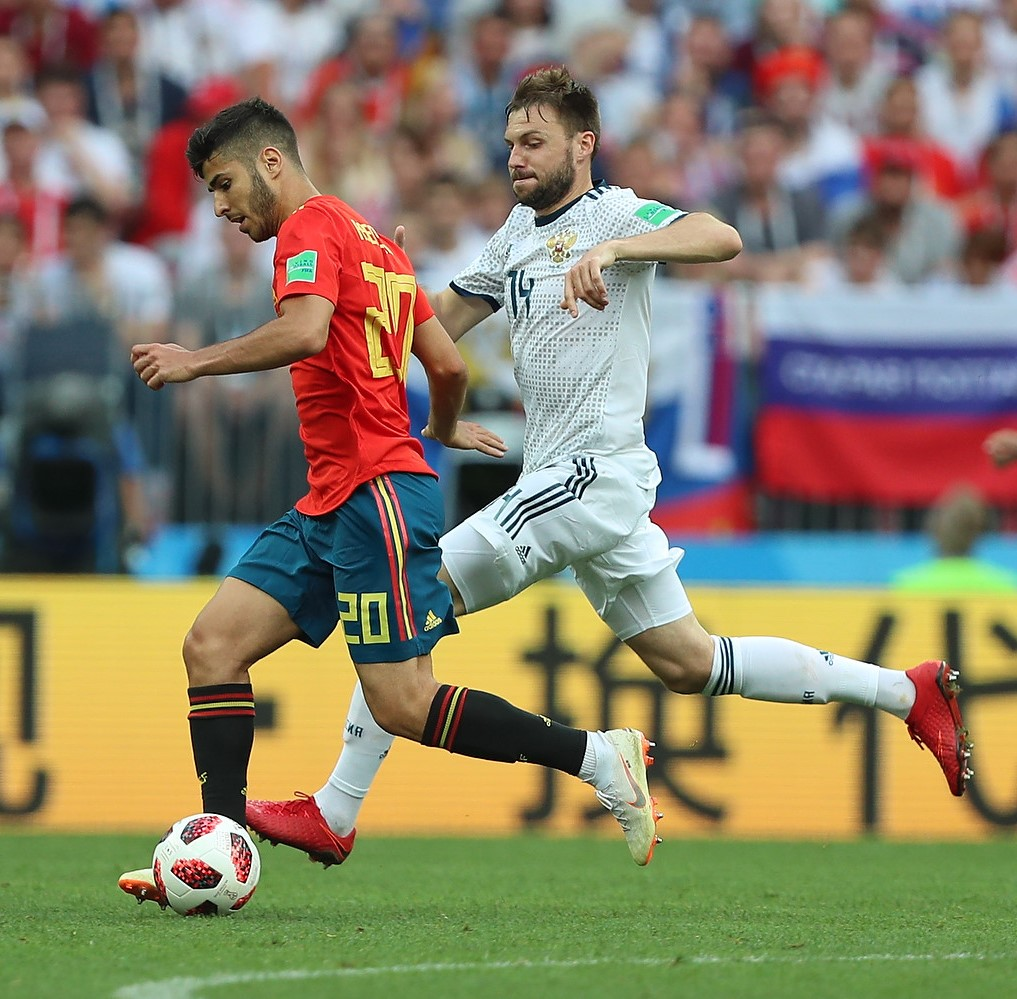
Asensio playing for Spain in 2018 FIFA World Cup against Russia

On 17 May 2016, Asensio and Espanyol teammate Pau López were called up to the full side for a friendly against Bosnia and Herzegovina. The 20-year-old made his debut on 29 May, starting in the 3–1 win in Switzerland. Selected in the squad for the 2017 European Under-21 Championship by manager Albert Celades, Asensio scored a hat-trick in his debut in the competition, helping to a 5–0 group stage routing of Macedonia. He reached with his teammates the final of the tournament, losing 1–0 against Germany. Back with the seniors, he was included in Julen Lopetegui's squad for the 2018 FIFA World Cup, making his debut in the competition on 20 June by replacing Real Madrid teammate Lucas Vázquez for the final ten minutes of the 1–0 group stage win against Iran.

Asensio scored his first goal for Spain on 11 September 2018, playing the entire 6–0 home rout of Croatia for the UEFA Nations League and also being directly involved in the play that led to Lovre Kalinić's own goal. In July 2021, he was included as an overage player in the 22-player squad of the under-23 team for the 2020 Summer Olympics. In November 2022, Asensio was included in Spain's final 26-man squad for the 2022 World Cup. He started in Spain’s opening fixture of the World Cup, scoring the team’s second goal in a 7-0 victory over Costa Rica.

== Personal life ==
Asensio's father, Gilberto (a Basque who spent his childhood in Essen, Germany), was also a footballer. Also an attacking midfielder, Gilberto represented Barakaldo CF as a youth; Marco's elder brother Igor played for Platges de Calvià, as a defender. Asensio's goal celebration in the 2017 Champions League final was dedicated to his family: "I told them that if I scored then I'd run to where they were. I knew where they were and that is what I did."

Asensio holds dual Spanish–Dutch citizenship and is multilingual, being a native speaker of both Spanish and Dutch while also speaking fluent German, English and Catalan.

Asensio married architect, interior designer and entrepreneur Sandra Garal on 7 July 2023 after five years of dating. In June 2024, Asensio and Garal announced on their respective social media confirming a mutual agreement to divorce.

In August 2025, Asensio was first romantically linked to influencer Lavinia León. On 28 September 2026, they announced via Instagram that they are expecting their first child, a baby boy.

== Career statistics ==
=== Club ===
As of match played 10 October 2026

Appearances and goals by club, season and competition
Club	Season	League			National cup (Note: Includes Copa del Rey, Coupe de France, FA Cup, Turkish Cup)		Europe		Other		Total	
Club	Season	Division	Apps	Goals	Apps	Goals	Apps	Goals	Apps	Goals	Apps	Goals
Mallorca B	2013–14	Tercera División	14	3	—		—		—		14	3
Mallorca (loan)	2013–14	Segunda División	20	1	0	0	—		—		20	1
Mallorca (loan)	2014–15	Segunda División	36	6	0	0	—		—		36	6
Mallorca (loan)	Total		56	7	0	0	—		—		56	7
Espanyol (loan)	2015–16	La Liga	34	4	3	0	—		—		37	4
Real Madrid	2016–17	La Liga	23	3	6	3	8 (Note: Appearance(s) in UEFA Champions League)	3	1 (Note: Appearance in UEFA Super Cup)	1	38	10
Real Madrid	2017–18	La Liga	32	6	5	2	12	1	4 (Note: One appearance in UEFA Super Cup, two appearances and two goals in Supercopa de España, one appearance in FIFA Club World Cup)	2	53	11
Real Madrid	2018–19	La Liga	30	1	5	3	7	2	2 (Note: One appearance in UEFA Super Cup, one appearance in FIFA Club World Cup)	0	44	6
Real Madrid	2019–20	La Liga	9	3	0	0	1	0	0	0	10	3
Real Madrid	2020–21	La Liga	35	5	1	0	11	2	1 (Note: Appearance in Supercopa de España)	0	48	7
Real Madrid	2021–22	La Liga	31	10	2	1	8	1	1	0	42	12
Real Madrid	2022–23	La Liga	31	9	5	0	12	3	3 (Note: Two appearances in Supercopa de España, one appearance in FIFA Club World Cup)	0	51	12
Real Madrid	Total		191	37	24	9	59	12	12	3	286	61
Paris Saint-Germain	2023–24	Ligue 1	19	4	5	1	6	0	1 (Note: Appearance in Trophée des Champions)	0	31	5
Paris Saint-Germain	2024–25	Ligue 1	12	2	0	0	4	0	0	0	16	2
Paris Saint-Germain	Total		31	6	5	1	10	0	1	0	47	7
Aston Villa (loan)	2024–25	Premier League	13	3	4	2	4	3	—		21	8
Fenerbahçe	2025–26	Süper Lig	25	11	2	2	9 (Note: Appearances in UEFA Europa League)	0	2 (Note: Appearances in Turkish Super Cup)	0	38	13
Fenerbahçe	2026–27	Süper Lig	3	2	0	0	5	0	0	0	8	2
Fenerbahçe	Total		28	13	2	2	14	0	2	0	46	15
Career total			366	73	38	14	87	15	15	3	507	105

=== International ===
As of match played 8 September 2023

Appearances and goals by national team and year
National team	Year	Apps	Goals
Spain	2016	2	0
Spain	2017	6	0
Spain	2018	12	1
Spain	2019	4	0
Spain	2020	2	0
Spain	2022	9	1
Spain	2023	3	0
Total		38	2

As of match played 8 September 2023

Spain score listed first, score column indicates score after each Asensio goal.

List of international goals scored by Marco Asensio
No.	Date	Venue	Opponent	Score	Result	Competition
1	11 September 2018	Martínez Valero, Elche, Spain	Croatia	2–0	6–0	2018–19 UEFA Nations League A
2	23 November 2022	Al Thumama Stadium, Doha, Qatar	Costa Rica	2–0	7–0	2022 FIFA World Cup

== Honours ==
Real Madrid

- La Liga: 2016–17, 2019–20, 2021–22
- Copa del Rey: 2022–23
- Supercopa de España: 2017, 2022
- UEFA Champions League: 2016–17, 2017–18, 2021–22
- UEFA Super Cup: 2016, 2017, 2022
- FIFA Club World Cup: 2016, 2017, 2018, 2022

Paris Saint-Germain

- Ligue 1: 2023–24
- Coupe de France: 2023–24
- Trophée des Champions: 2023, 2024
- UEFA Champions League: 2024–25

Fenerbahçe

- Turkish Super Cup: 2025

Spain U19

- UEFA European Under-19 Championship: 2015

Spain U21

- UEFA European Under-21 Championship runner-up: 2017

Spain Olympic

- Summer Olympic silver medal: 2020

Spain

- UEFA Nations League: 2022–23

Individual

- Segunda División Player of the Month: October 2014
- UEFA European Under-19 Championship Golden Player: 2015
- La Liga Breakthrough Player: 2015–16
- UEFA European Under-21 Championship Silver Boot: 2017
- UEFA European Under-21 Championship Team of the Tournament: 2017
- UEFA Champions League Breakthrough XI: 2017
