= 2017 UEFA Super Cup =

- Match programme cover
Real Madrid	Manchester United
(Spain)	(England)
2	1
- Date: 8 August 2017
- Venue: Philip II Arena, Skopje
- Man of the Match: Isco (Real Madrid)
- Referee: Gianluca Rocchi (Italy)
- Attendance: 30,421
- Weather: Partly cloudy 32 °C (90 °F); 48% humidity

The 2017 UEFA Super Cup was the 42nd edition of the UEFA Super Cup, an annual football match organised by UEFA and contested by the reigning champions of the two main European club competitions, the UEFA Champions League and the UEFA Europa League. The match featured Spanish side Real Madrid, the title holders and winners of the 2016–17 UEFA Champions League, and English side Manchester United, the winners of the 2016–17 UEFA Europa League. The match was played at the Philip II Arena in Skopje, FYR Macedonia, on 8 August 2017, and was the first UEFA final staged in the country.

Real Madrid won the match 2–1 for their second consecutive and fourth overall UEFA Super Cup title.

== Teams ==
Team	Qualification	Previous participation (bold indicates winners)
(Spain) Real Madrid^{TH}	Winners of the 2016–17 UEFA Champions League	5 (1998, 2000, **2002**, **2014**, **2016**)
(England) Manchester United	Winners of the 2016–17 UEFA Europa League	3 (**1991**, 1999, 2008)

While the two teams had never met in the Super Cup, they had met 10 times in the European Champion Clubs' Cup/UEFA Champions League; Real Madrid had the advantage in the teams' previous meetings, with four wins, four draws and two losses.

== Venue ==
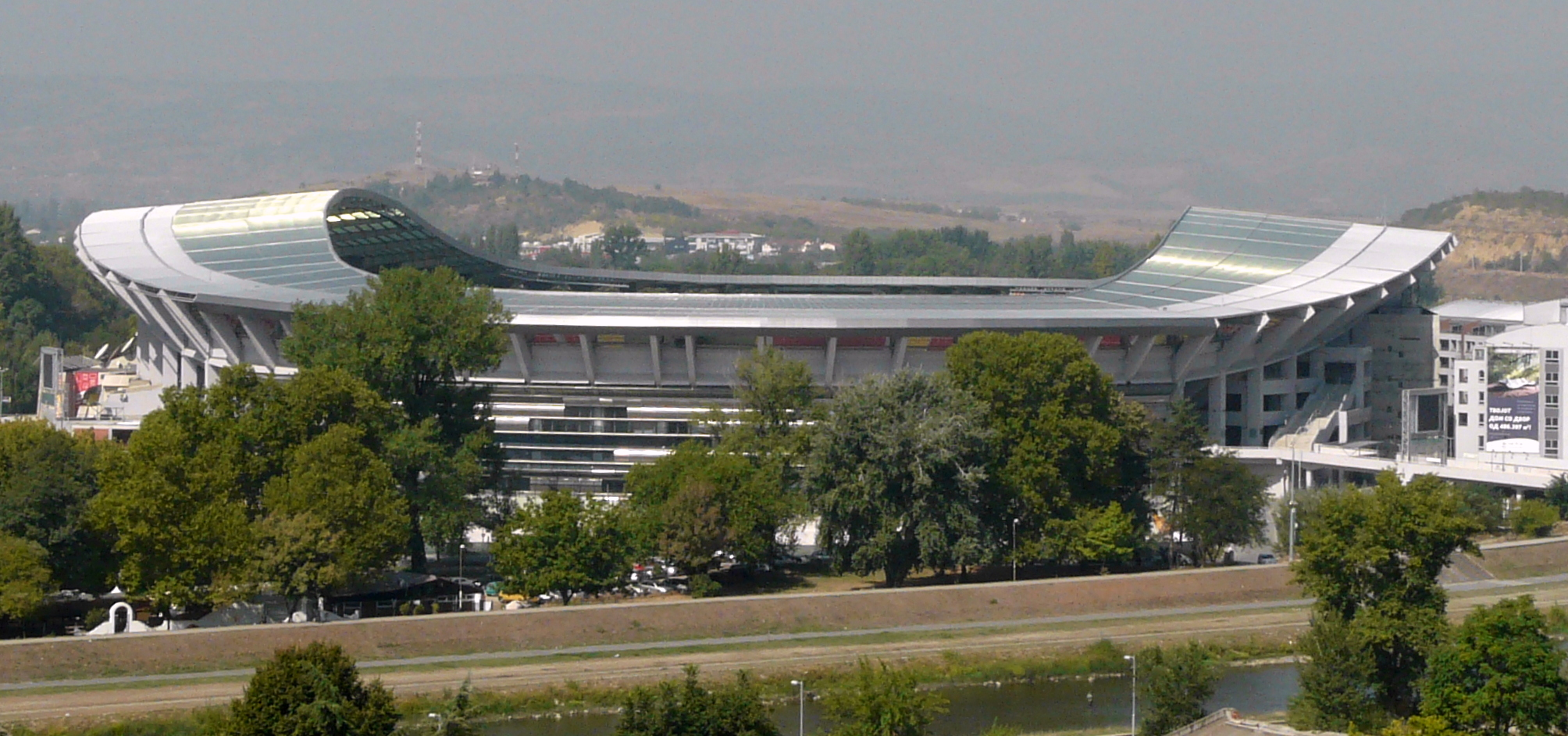
The Philip II Arena in Skopje hosted the match.

The Philip II Arena was announced as the final venue on 30 June 2015, following the decision of the UEFA Executive Committee meeting in Prague, Czech Republic.

== Pre-match ==
=== Ticketing ===
With a stadium capacity of 30,500 for the match, a total number of 23,000 tickets were available to fans and the general public, being available for sale to fans worldwide via UEFA.com from 13 June to 4 July 2017 in three price categories: €50, €30, and €15. The remaining tickets were allocated to the local organising committee, UEFA and national associations, commercial partners and broadcasters.

=== Officials ===
Italian referee Gianluca Rocchi was announced as the referee by UEFA on 20 July 2017.

== Match ==
=== Summary ===
In the 16th minute, Casemiro headed against the bar after a corner from the left-hand side by Toni Kroos, before opening the scoring eight minutes later with a left-footed strike after a pass into the box from Dani Carvajal. Isco made it 2–0 in the 52nd minute when he side-footed the ball into the bottom corner of the net from six yards after a pass from Gareth Bale. In the 61st minute, Bale hit the bar with a shot from the right of the penalty area. Romelu Lukaku pulled a goal back for Manchester United a minute later when he followed up on an initial shot from Nemanja Matić, which was parried back into his path by Keylor Navas.

=== Details ===
The Champions League winners were designated as the "home" team for administrative purposes.

8 August 2017
20:45 UTC+2

Real Madrid (Spain)	2–1	(England) Manchester United
Casemiro 24'; Isco 52'	Report	Lukaku 62'

Philip II Arena, Skopje
Attendance: 30,421
Referee: Gianluca Rocchi (Italy)

**Real Madrid**	**Manchester United**

GK	1	(Costa Rica) Keylor Navas
RB	2	(Spain) Dani Carvajal	(yellow card) 84'
CB	5	(France) Raphaël Varane
CB	4	(Spain) Sergio Ramos (c)	(yellow card) 86'
LB	12	(Brazil) Marcelo
CM	10	(Croatia) Luka Modrić
CM	14	(Brazil) Casemiro
CM	8	(Germany) Toni Kroos
RF	11	(Wales) Gareth Bale		(substituted off) 74'
CF	9	(France) Karim Benzema		(substituted off) 83'
LF	22	(Spain) Isco		(substituted off) 74'
Substitutes:
GK	13	(Spain) Kiko Casilla
DF	6	(Spain) Nacho
DF	15	(France) Théo Hernandez
MF	20	(Spain) Marco Asensio		(substituted on) 74'
MF	23	(Croatia) Mateo Kovačić
FW	7	(Portugal) Cristiano Ronaldo		(substituted on) 83'
FW	17	(Spain) Lucas Vázquez		(substituted on) 74'
Manager:
(France) Zinedine Zidane

GK	1	(Spain) David de Gea
RB	25	(Ecuador) Antonio Valencia (c)
CB	2	(Sweden) Victor Lindelöf
CB	12	(England) Chris Smalling
LB	36	(Italy) Matteo Darmian
CM	21	(Spain) Ander Herrera		(substituted off) 56'
CM	31	(Serbia) Nemanja Matić
CM	6	(France) Paul Pogba
RW	22	(Armenia) Henrikh Mkhitaryan
LW	14	(England) Jesse Lingard	(yellow card) 42'	(substituted off) 46'
CF	9	(Belgium) Romelu Lukaku
Substitutes:
GK	20	(Argentina) Sergio Romero
DF	17	(Netherlands) Daley Blind
MF	8	(Spain) Juan Mata
MF	16	(England) Michael Carrick
MF	27	(Belgium) Marouane Fellaini		(substituted on) 56'
FW	11	(France) Anthony Martial
FW	19	(England) Marcus Rashford	(yellow card) 90+4'	(substituted on) 46'
Manager:
(Portugal) José Mourinho

Man of the Match:
Isco (Real Madrid)

Assistant referees:
Elenito Di Liberatore (Italy)
Mauro Tonolini (Italy)
Fourth official:
Clément Turpin (France)
Additional assistant referees:
Davide Massa (Italy)
Massimiliano Irrati (Italy)
Reserve assistant referee:
Riccardo Di Fiore (Italy)

**Match rules**

- 90 minutes
- 30 minutes of extra time if necessary
- Penalty shoot-out if scores still level
- Seven named substitutes, of which up to three may be used

=== Statistics ===
First half
Statistic	Real Madrid	Manchester United
Goals scored	1	0
Total shots	7	4
Shots on target	2	1
Saves	1	1
Ball possession	60%	40%
Corner kicks	3	0
Fouls committed	3	9
Offsides	1	1
Yellow cards	0	1
Red cards	0	0

Second half
Statistic	Real Madrid	Manchester United
Goals scored	1	1
Total shots	9	9
Shots on target	4	5
Saves	4	3
Ball possession	59%	41%
Corner kicks	5	2
Fouls committed	7	8
Offsides	0	1
Yellow cards	2	1
Red cards	0	0

Overall
Statistic	Real Madrid	Manchester United
Goals scored	2	1
Total shots	16	13
Shots on target	6	6
Saves	5	4
Ball possession	59%	41%
Corner kicks	8	2
Fouls committed	10	17
Offsides	1	2
Yellow cards	2	2
Red cards	0	0

== See also ==
- 2017 UEFA Champions League final
- 2017 UEFA Europa League final
- 2017–18 UEFA Champions League
- 2017–18 UEFA Europa League
- 2017–18 Manchester United F.C. season
- 2017–18 Real Madrid CF season
- Manchester United F.C. in international football
- Real Madrid CF in international football
