= 2017–18 Real Madrid CF season =

Real Madrid
2017–18 season
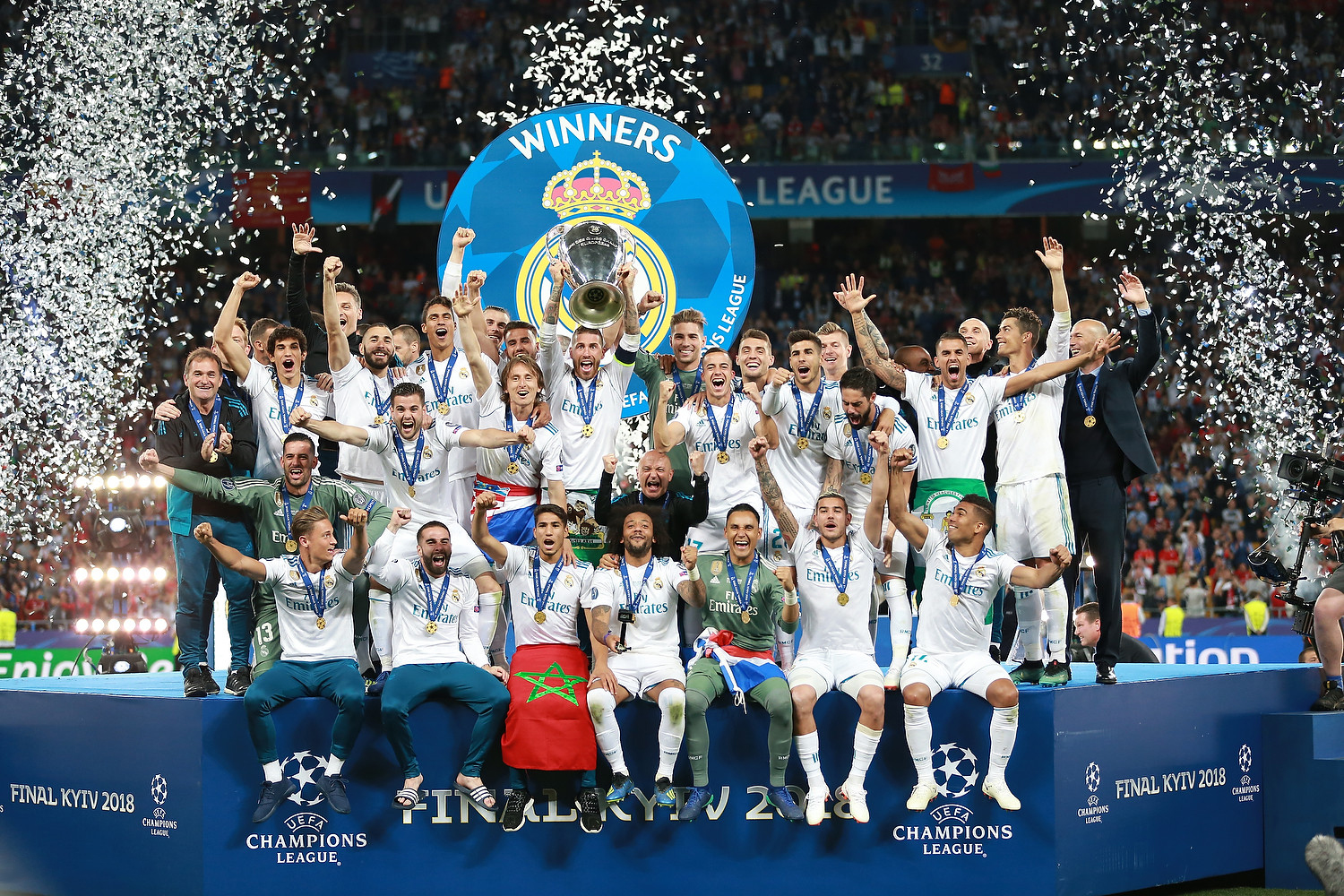
- Captain Sergio Ramos hoisting the European Cup as Real Madrid celebrate winning the 2017-18 UEFA Champions League, on 26 May 2018
- President: Florentino Pérez
- Head coach: Zinedine Zidane
- Stadium: Santiago Bernabéu
- La Liga: 3rd
- Copa del Rey: Quarter-finals
- Supercopa de España: Winners
- UEFA Champions League: Winners
- UEFA Super Cup: Winners
- FIFA Club World Cup: Winners
- Top goalscorer: League: Cristiano Ronaldo (26); All: Cristiano Ronaldo (44)
- Highest home attendance: 80,737 vs Barcelona (23 December 2017)
- Lowest home attendance: 37,553 vs Numancia (10 January 2018)
- Average home league attendance: 65,652
- Biggest win: Real Madrid 7–1 Deportivo La Coruña; APOEL 0–6 Real Madrid; Real Madrid 6–0 Celta Vigo
- Biggest defeat: Real Madrid 0-3 Barcelona
Home colours	Away colours	Third colours

The 2017–18 season was Real Madrid Club de Fútbol's 114th season in existence and the club's 87th consecutive season in the top flight of Spanish football. It covered a period from 1 July 2017 to 30 June 2018.

Despite finishing a distant third in the league that season, Real Madrid won four trophies out of six possible, including a third consecutive Champions League title, which made them the first team to achieve the feat since Bayern Munich in 1976 and the first ever to do it twice. This was also Madrid's fourth European Cup in five years, and their 13th overall. The three-peat winning manager Zinedine Zidane resigned shortly after the season concluded; he would return by the end of next season. Additionally, this was notably considered being Cristiano Ronaldo's final time staying with Los Merengues after 9 years spent winning 16 trophies altogether.

This season was the first since 2006–07 without Pepe, who departed to Turkish club Besiktas.

== Summary ==
=== Pre-season ===
Théo Hernandez and Dani Ceballos joined Madrid on 5 and 14 July 2017.

Pepe went to Beşiktaş after his contract was up after the last season. James Rodríguez and Fábio Coentrão were loaned to Bayern Munich and Sporting CP respectively.

Mariano Díaz was transferred to Lyon. On 21 July, Álvaro Morata moved to Chelsea. Two days later, Danilo left Madrid and joined Manchester City.

=== August ===
On 8 August 2017, Madrid won the 2017 UEFA Super Cup, beating Manchester United 2–1 with goals from Casemiro and Isco.

On 13 August 2017, Madrid won the away leg of the 2017 Supercopa de España, defeating Barcelona 3–1 with goals from Cristiano Ronaldo, Marco Asensio and an own goal. The match was controversial, as several referring mistakes affected the teams. First, Barcelona was awarded a questionable penalty on Luis Suárez, which Messi converted to equalize in the 77th minute, and then, after Real scored their second via substitute Ronaldo, who shot into the top right corner from the edge of the box in the 80th minute, Cristiano was booked for removing his shirt as part of the celebration; two minutes later, he was booked again by the referee for allegedly diving when he collided with Samuel Umtiti in the box, which resulted in a second yellow card and Ronaldo being sent off, therefore getting suspended for the second leg. He was later given a five-match suspension after replays showed him push the referee in frustration for the red card. The latter penalty in hindsight derailed Madrid's season start and cost them points in La Liga. Real's last goal was scored in the 90th minute in similar fashion to the second, as Asensio shot into the top left corner following an assist from Lucas Vázquez.

Three days later, on 16 August 2017, Madrid clinched the title, after a 2–0 home win (5–1 on aggregate) with goals from Asensio and Karim Benzema. Goals from Gareth Bale, Casemiro and Toni Kroos gave Madrid a 3–0 winning start in the league campaign at Deportivo La Coruña on 20 August 2017. On 24 August 2017, the 2017–18 UEFA Champions League group stage draw was held, and Madrid was drawn in Group H, along with Borussia Dortmund, Tottenham Hotspur and APOEL. On 27 August 2017, two goals from Asensio were not enough as Madrid drew Valencia 2–2 at the Bernabéu.

=== September ===
Marcelo signed a new contract on 13 September, keeping him at the club until the summer of 2022. The same day, Madrid kicked off the new Champions League season with a 3–0 victory over APOEL, with a brace from Ronaldo and a goal from Sergio Ramos. A day later, Isco renewed his contract until 2022. The contract from Dani Carvajal was extended to 2022 on 17 September 2017. Later that day, Madrid got a 3–1 victory at Real Sociedad after goals from Borja Mayoral, Bale and an own goal. Because of the first goal, Madrid scored in their 73rd consecutive match, equalling the record set by Santos FC in 1963. The contract of Benzema was extended until 2021 on 20 September 2017. On the same day, Madrid lost to Real Betis 0–1, conceding a late goal. The defeat also ended their goalscoring streak. Marcos Llorente's contract was extended until 2021 on 23 September 2017. A brace from Ceballos secured Madrid a 2–1 win over Alavés on the same day. Madrid produced a comprehensive 3–1 away victory against Borussia Dortmund in the Champions League just three days later, with a brace from Ronaldo and another goal from Bale. A day later, Raphaël Varane's contract was extended until 2022. On 28 September 2017, Asensio's contract was extended until 2023.

=== October ===
A brace from Isco helped Madrid to defeat Espanyol 2–0 on the first day of the month. On 14 October 2017, a late winner from Ronaldo secured a 2–1 victory at Getafe after Benzema initially gave Madrid the lead. Three days later, against Tottenham Hotspur, a goal from Ronaldo was not enough as the game ended in a 1–1 draw. Goals from Asensio, Marcelo and an own goal gave Madrid a 3–0 win over Eibar on 22 October 2017. On 26 October 2017, two converted penalties by Asensio and Vázquez saw Madrid kick off the Copa del Rey season with a 2–0 away win in the first leg against Fuenlabrada. A goal from Isco was not enough as Madrid lost to Girona, which ended their 13-game winning streak away from home.

=== November ===
On the first day of the new month, Madrid lost 1–3 against Tottenham in the Champions League, to concede their second consecutive loss. A late goal from Ronaldo was not enough. The next league match, on 5 November 2017, was won 3–0 against Las Palmas with goals from Casemiro, Asensio and Isco.

On 18 November 2017, the Madrid derby ended in a goalless draw. Madrid booked their place in the Champions League knockout stage after a 6–0 away victory over APOEL, with braces from Benzema and Ronaldo plus goals from Luka Modrić and Nacho on 21 November 2017. Four days later, Málaga CF was defeated after goals from Benzema, Casemiro and Ronaldo, 3–2. The return leg of the Copa del Rey tie against Fuenlabrada, on 28 November 2017, ended in a 2–2 draw with both goals coming from Mayoral. The aggregate score was 4–2 in favour of Madrid who advanced to the next round.

=== December ===
On the second day of the month, Madrid travelled to Bilbao and came up short with a 0–0 draw. Four days later, the last group stage match saw Madrid taking on Borussia Dortmund. Goals from Mayoral, Ronaldo and Vázquez gave Real a 3–2 victory. Ronaldo also set a competition record, having scored in every group stage match. Three days later, on 9 December, Madrid won 5–0 against Sevilla, with a brace from Ronaldo and goals from Nacho, Kroos and Achraf Hakimi, who all scored in the first half. On 13 December 2017, the semi-final in the 2017 FIFA Club World Cup against Al Jazira was won 2–1 by goals from Ronaldo and Bale. Three days later, Madrid won the tournament after a 1–0 final victory over Grêmio, with Ronaldo scoring the decisive goal from a spectacular free kick. Back in Spain, El Clásico ended in a 0–3 defeat on 23 December 2017.

=== January ===
The new year started just four days in, with a Copa del Rey round of 16 first leg against Numancia. The game ended in a 3–0 win after goals from Bale, Isco and Mayoral. On 7 January 2018, the match against Celta Vigo ended in a 2–2 draw, with a brace from Bale. Three days later, a brace from Vázquez in a 2–2 draw in the return leg of the Copa del Rey against Numnacia was enough for Madrid to advance to the quarter-finals, thanks to a 5–2 aggregate win. On 13 January 2018, Madrid lost 0–1 against Villarreal, conceding a late goal. A goal from Asensio gave Madrid a 1–0 advantage after the first leg of the Copa del Rey quarter-finals against Leganés on 18 January 2018. Three days later, braces from Nacho, Bale and Ronaldo, plus a goal from Modrić, secured Madrid a resounding 7–1 victory over Deportivo La Coruña. Madrid was eliminated from the Copa del Rey on 24 January 2018, after they lost the second leg against Leganés 1–2, despite a goal from Benzema. Leganés advanced on the away goals rule, with the aggregate score being tied 2–2. The next weekend, on 27 January 2018, Madrid went on to win 4–1 at Valencia after a brace from Ronaldo and goals from Marcelo and Kroos.

=== February ===
On 3 February 2018, Madrid travelled to Levante and came away with a 2–2 draw, despite having been in front twice after goals from Ramos and Isco. A hat-trick from Ronaldo and goals from Vázquez and Kroos gave Madrid a 5–2 victory against Real Sociedad, a week later. The first leg of the Champions League round of 16 against Paris Saint-Germain on 14 February 2018 was won 3–1 after a brace from Ronaldo and a goal from Marcelo. Four days later, two goals from Asensio and goals from Ramos, Ronaldo and Benzema secured Madrid a 5–3 win over Real Betis. Against Leganés, on 21 February 2018, Madrid won 3–1 after goals from Vázquez, Casemiro and Ramos. Just three days later, a brace from Ronaldo and goals from Bale and Benzema secured Real a 4–0 win over Alavés. The away game at Espanyol was lost 0–1 after an injury-time goal on 27 February 2018.

=== March ===
On 3 March 2018, a brace from Ronaldo and a goal from Bale helped Madrid to get a 3–1 win over Getafe. Three days later, the return leg of the UEFA Champions League round of 16 tie against Paris Saint-Germain was won 2–1 after goals from Ronaldo and Casemiro. That result gave Madrid a 5–2 advantage over the two legs. Another four days later, a brace from Ronaldo secured Real all three points in a 2–1 away win at Eibar. On 18 March 2018, Madrid defeated Girona 6–3 at home with four goals from Ronaldo and singles from Vázquez and Bale. On the last day of March, a brace from Bale and a goal from Benzema helped Real to record a fifth consecutive victory with a 3–0 win at Las Palmas.

=== April ===
On 3 April 2018, in the Champions League quarter-finals against Juventus, Ronaldo scored twice, including a spectacular overhead kick, and Marcelo added another goal to give Madrid a 3–0 first leg victory. Five days later, a volley goal from Ronaldo put Madrid in the lead against Atlético, but the match eventually ended 1–1. On 11 April 2018, down 0–3, Ronaldo converted an injury time penalty to secure Madrid a spot in the semi-finals of the Champions League; the 1–3 loss was enough as Real won 4–3 on aggregate against Juventus. Four days later, goals from Isco and Casemiro secured a 2–1 win over Málaga. A late Ronaldo equalizer got Madrid a 1–1 draw against Athletic Bilbao on 18 April 2018. A week later, against Bayern Munich in the semi-finals of the Champions League, Madrid got a 2–1 away leg win after goals from Marcelo and Asensio. On 28 April 2018, the game against Leganés was won 2–1 with goals from Bale and Mayoral.

=== May ===
A brace from Benzema against Bayern Munich helped Madrid to reach the final after the second leg ended in a 2–2 draw on 1 May 2018, which secured a 4–3 aggregate victory. The Clásico, five days later, ended in a 2–2 draw with goals from Ronaldo and Bale. Just three days later, on 9 May 2018, Madrid lost 2–3 at Sevilla with late goals from Mayoral and Ramos. Three days later, Madrid won 6–0 against Celta Vigo, with Bale scoring a brace and Isco, Hakimi, Kroos and an own goal chipping in the other goals. The last game of the league season, on 19 May 2018, ended in a 2–2 away draw against Villarreal, after goals from Bale and Ronaldo initially gave Madrid the lead. On 26 May 2018, two goals from Bale and another one from Benzema helped Madrid to win their third consecutive Champions League title, and fourth in five years, after defeating Liverpool 3–1.

== Squad ==
N	Pos.	Nat.	Name	Age	EU	Since	App	Goals	Ends	Transfer fee	Notes
1	GK	(Costa Rica)	Keylor Navas	31	EU	2014	141	0	2020	€10M	Second nationality: Spain
2	RB	(Spain)	Dani Carvajal	26	EU	2013	199	4	2022	€6.5M	Originally from youth system
3	CB	(Spain)	Jesús Vallejo	21	EU	2015	12	0	2021	€6M	
4	CB	(Spain)	Sergio Ramos (captain)	32	EU	2005	564	73	2020	€28M	
5	CB	(France)	Raphaël Varane	25	EU	2011	233	10	2022	€10M	
6	CB	(Spain)	Nacho	28	EU	2012	160	9	2021	Youth system	
7	LW	(Portugal)	Cristiano Ronaldo (2nd vice-captain)	33	EU	2009	438	450	2021	€94M	
8	CM	(Germany)	Toni Kroos	28	EU	2014	190	12	2022	€25M	
9	ST	(France)	Karim Benzema (3rd vice-captain)	30	EU	2009	412	192	2021	€35M	Second nationality: Algeria
10	CM	(Croatia)	Luka Modrić	32	EU	2012	257	13	2020	€30M	
11	RW	(Wales)	Gareth Bale	28	EU	2013	185	88	2022	€100.8M	
12	LB	(Brazil)	Marcelo (vice-captain)	30	EU	2007 (Winter)	452	33	2022	€6.5M	Second nationality: Spain
13	GK	(Spain)	Kiko Casilla	31	EU	2015	43	0	2020	€6M	Originally from youth system
14	CM	(Brazil)	Casemiro	26	Non-EU	2013	149	14	2021	€6M	
15	LB	(France)	Théo Hernandez	20	EU	2017	23	0	2023	€30M	
17	RW	(Spain)	Lucas Vázquez	27	EU	2015	135	16	2021	€1M	Originally from youth system
18	CM	(Spain)	Marcos Llorente	23	EU	2015	23	0	2021	Youth system	
19	RB	(Morocco)	Achraf Hakimi	19	EU	2017	17	2	2018	Youth system	Second nationality: Spain
20	LW	(Spain)	Marco Asensio	22	EU	2014	90	21	2023	€3.9M	Second nationality: Netherlands
21	ST	(Spain)	Borja Mayoral	21	EU	2015	29	7	2021	Youth system	
22	CM	(Spain)	Isco	26	EU	2013	240	42	2022	€27M	
23	CM	(Croatia)	Mateo Kovačić	24	EU	2015	108	3	2021	€29M	
24	CM	(Spain)	Dani Ceballos	21	EU	2017	22	2	2023	€16.5M	

- Last updated: 26 May 2018
- Source: realmadrid.com
- Ordered by squad number.

== Transfers ==
=== In ===
No.	Pos.	Nat.	Name	Age	EU	Moving from	Type	Transfer window	Ends	Transfer fee	Source
3	DF	(Spain)	Jesús Vallejo	20	EU	(Germany) Eintracht Frankfurt	End of loan	Summer	2021	Free	
15	DF	(France)	Théo Hernandez	19	EU	Atlético Madrid	Transfer	Summer	2023	€24M	Real Madrid C.F.
18	MF	(Spain)	Marcos Llorente	22	EU	Alavés	End of loan	Summer	2018	Free	
19	DF	(Morocco)	Achraf Hakimi	18	EU	R.M. Castilla	Promoted	Summer	2018	Youth system	
21	FW	(Spain)	Borja Mayoral	20	EU	(Germany) VfL Wolfsburg	End of loan	Summer	2021	Free	
24	MF	(Spain)	Dani Ceballos	20	EU	Real Betis	Transfer	Summer	2023	€16.5M	Real Madrid C.F.
	DF	(Spain)	Diego Llorente	23	EU	Málaga	End of loan	Summer	2020	Free	
	FW	(Spain)	Burgui	23	EU	Sporting Gijón	End of loan	Summer	2017	Free	

Total spending: ▼€40.5M

=== Out ===
No.	Pos.	Nat.	Name	Age	EU	Moving to	Type	Transfer window	Transfer fee	Source
3	DF	(Portugal)	Pepe	34	EU	(Turkey) Beşiktaş	End of contract	Summer	Free	Beşiktaş J.K.
10	MF	(Colombia)	James Rodríguez	25	Non-EU	(Germany) Bayern Munich	Loan	Summer	€13M	FC Bayern Munich
15	DF	(Portugal)	Fábio Coentrão	29	EU	(Portugal) Sporting CP	Loan	Summer	Free	Sporting Clube de Portugal
18	FW	(Dominican Republic)	Mariano	23	EU	(France) Lyon	Transfer	Summer	€8M	Olympique Lyonnais
21	FW	(Spain)	Álvaro Morata	24	EU	(England) Chelsea	Transfer	Summer	€65M	Chelsea F.C.
23	DF	(Brazil)	Danilo	25	Non-EU	(England) Manchester City	Transfer	Summer	€30M	Manchester City F.C.
25	GK	(Spain)	Rubén Yáñez	23	EU	Getafe	Transfer	Summer	Free	Getafe CF
	DF	(Spain)	Diego Llorente	23	EU	Real Sociedad	Transfer	Summer	€7M	Real Sociedad
	FW	(Spain)	Burgui	23	EU	Alavés	Transfer	Summer	€3M	Deportivo Alavés

Total income: ▲€141M Net income: ▲€100.5M

== Pre-season and friendlies ==
23 July 2017 1	Real Madrid	1–1 (1–2 p)	Manchester United	Santa Clara, United States
14:00 PDT	Casemiro 69' (pen.); Óscar (yellow card) 85'	Report	Lingard 45+1'	Stadium: Levi's Stadium; Attendance: 65,109; Referee: Kevin Stott (United States)
	Penalties
	Kovačić (penalty missed); Óscar (penalty missed); Quezada (penalty scored); Hernandez (penalty missed); Casemiro (penalty missed)		(penalty missed) Martial; (penalty missed) McTominay; (penalty scored) Mkhitaryan; (penalty missed) Lindelöf; (penalty scored) Blind

26 July 2017 2	Manchester City	4–1	Real Madrid	Los Angeles, United States
20:30 PDT	Touré (yellow card) 29'; Otamendi 52'; Sterling 59'; Stones 67'; Brahim 81'; Nasri (yellow card) 88'	Report	Nacho (yellow card) 33'; Carvajal (yellow card) 41'; Óscar 90'	Stadium: Los Angeles Memorial Coliseum; Attendance: 93,098; Referee: Baldomero Toledo (United States)

29 July 2017 3	Real Madrid	2–3	Barcelona	Miami Gardens, United States
20:05 EDT	Kovačić 14'; Varane (yellow card) 22'; Asensio 36'; Carvajal (yellow card) 60'	Report	Messi 3'; Rakitić 7'; Piqué 50'; L. Suárez (yellow card) 60'; Samper (yellow card) 78'	Stadium: Hard Rock Stadium; Attendance: 66,014; Referee: Jair Marrufo (United States)

2 August 2017 4	MLS All-Stars	1–1 (2–4 p)	Real Madrid	Chicago, United States
18:30 CT	Dwyer 87'	Report	Mayoral 59'	Stadium: Soldier Field; Attendance: 61,428; Referee: Allen Chapman (United States)
	Penalties
	Dwyer (penalty missed); Dos Santos (penalty missed); Valeri (penalty scored); Almirón (penalty scored)		(penalty scored) Benzema; (penalty scored) Bale; (penalty scored) Kovačić; (penalty scored) Marcelo

23 August 2017 5	Real Madrid	2–1	Fiorentina	Madrid, Spain
22:45	Mayoral 7'; Ronaldo 33'	Report	Veretout 4'; Benassi (yellow card) 49'; Cristóforo (yellow card) 68'; Olivera (yellow card) 89'	Stadium: Santiago Bernabéu; Referee: Ignacio Iglesias Villanueva (Spain)

== Competitions ==
Times from 1 July to 29 October 2017 and from 25 March to 30 June 2018 are UTC+2, from 30 October 2017 to 25 March 2018 UTC+1.

=== Overview ===
Competition	First match	Last match	Starting round	Final position	Record							
Competition	First match	Last match	Starting round	Final position	Pld	W	D	L	GF	GA	GD	Win %
La Liga	20 August 2017	19 May 2018	Matchday 1	Third place	38	22	10	6	94	44	+50	57.89
Copa del Rey	26 October 2017	24 January 2018	Round of 32	Quarter-finals	6	3	2	1	11	6	+5	50.00
Supercopa de España	13 August 2017	16 August 2017	Final	Winners	2	2	0	0	5	1	+4	100.00
Champions League	13 September 2017	26 May 2018	Group stage	Winners	13	9	2	2	33	16	+17	69.23
UEFA Super Cup	8 August 2017		Final	Winners	1	1	0	0	2	1	+1	100.00
FIFA Club World Cup	13 December 2017	16 December 2017	Semi-finals	Winners	2	2	0	0	3	1	+2	100.00
Total					62	39	14	9	148	69	+79	62.90

Last updated: 26 May 2018
Source: Soccerway

=== La Liga ===
==== League table ====
Pos	Team	Pld	W	D	L	GF	GA	GD	Pts	Qualification or relegation
1	Barcelona (C)	38	28	9	1	99	29	+70	93	Qualification for the Champions League group stage
2	Atlético Madrid	38	23	10	5	58	22	+36	79	Qualification for the Champions League group stage
3	Real Madrid	38	22	10	6	94	44	+50	76	Qualification for the Champions League group stage
4	Valencia	38	22	7	9	65	38	+27	73	Qualification for the Champions League group stage
5	Villarreal	38	18	7	13	57	50	+7	61	Qualification for the Europa League group stage (Note: Since the winners of the 2017–18 Copa del Rey, Barcelona, qualified for European competition based on league position, the spot awarded to the cup winners (Europa League group stage) was passed to the sixth-placed team and the spot awarded to the sixth-placed team (Europa League second qualifying round) was passed to the seventh-placed team.)

Source: La Liga, Soccerway
Rules for classification: 1) Points; 2) Head-to-head points; 3) Head-to-head goal difference; 4) Goal difference; 5) Goals scored; 6) Fair-play points (Note: Head-to-head record is used only after all the matches between the teams in question have been played)
(C) Champions

==== Results summary ====
Overall								Home						Away					
Pld	W	D	L	GF	GA	GD	Pts	W	D	L	GF	GA	GD	W	D	L	GF	GA	GD
38	22	10	6	94	44	+50	76	12	4	3	54	20	+34	10	6	3	40	24	+16

Last updated: 19 May 2018.
Source: LaLiga

==== Result round by round ====
Round	1	2	3	4	5	6	7	8	9	10	11	12	13	14	15	16	17	18	19	20	21	22	23	24	25	26	27	28	29	30	31	32	33	34	35	36	37	38
Ground	A	H	H	A	H	A	H	A	H	A	H	A	H	A	H	H	A	H	H	A	A	H	A	A	H	A	H	A	H	A	H	A	H	H	A	A	H	A
Result	W	D	D	W	L	W	W	W	W	L	W	D	W	D	W	L	D	L	W	W	D	W	W	W	W	L	W	W	W	W	D	W	D	W	D	L	W	D
Position	1	5	7	4	8	6	5	3	3	3	3	3	4	4	4	4	4	4	4	4	4	4	4	3	3	3	3	3	3	3	4	3	3	3	3	3	3	3

Updated to match(es) played on 19 May 2018. Source: LaLiga
A = Away; H = Home; W = Win; D = Draw; L = Loss

==== Matches ====
20 August 2017 1	Deportivo La Coruña	0–3	Real Madrid	A Coruña
22:15	Bakkali (yellow card) 24'; Schär (yellow card) 53'; Cartabia (yellow card) 60'; Mosquera (yellow card) 84'; Andone (yellow card) 87'	Report	Bale 20'; Casemiro 27'; Ramos (yellow card) 53' (yellow-red card) 90+2'; Modrić (yellow card) 57'; Kroos 62'	Stadium: Abanca Riazor; Attendance: 27,801; Referee: José González González

27 August 2017 2	Real Madrid	2–2	Valencia	Madrid
22:15	Asensio 10', 83'; Nacho (yellow card) 53'; Casemiro (yellow card) 61'; Carvajal (yellow card) 72'	Report	Soler 18', (yellow card) 84'; Montoya (yellow card) 49'; Parejo (yellow card) 66'; Kondogbia 77'; Rodrigo (yellow card) 81'; Zaza (yellow card) 90+2'	Stadium: Santiago Bernabéu; Attendance: 61,739; Referee: David Fernández Borbalán

9 September 2017 3	Real Madrid	1–1	Levante	Madrid
13:00	Vázquez 36'; Ramos (yellow card) 54'; Carvajal (yellow card) 66'; Marcelo (red card) 89'	Report	Ivi 12'; Lerma (yellow card) 45'; Alegría (yellow card) 47'; Boateng (yellow card) 60'	Stadium: Santiago Bernabéu; Attendance: 67,789; Referee: Alejandro Hernández Hernández

17 September 2017 4	Real Sociedad	1–3	Real Madrid	San Sebastián
20:45	Rodrigues 28'; Llorente (yellow card) 36'; Illarramendi (yellow card) 42'; Januzaj (yellow card) 45'	Report	Mayoral 19'; Rodrigues 36' (o.g.); Asensio (yellow card) 38'; Bale 61'; Casemiro (yellow card) 64'	Stadium: Anoeta; Attendance: 24,675; Referee: Ignacio Iglesias Villanueva

20 September 2017 5	Real Madrid	0–1	Real Betis	Madrid
22:00		Report	Tello (yellow card) 36'; Mandi (yellow card) 38'; Feddal (yellow card) 58'; Sanabria 90+4'	Stadium: Santiago Bernabéu; Attendance: 61,757; Referee: Antonio Mateu Lahoz

23 September 2017 6	Alavés	1–2	Real Madrid	Vitoria-Gasteiz
16:15	Vigaray (yellow card) 14'; M. García 40', (yellow card) 67'; Ely (yellow card) 45'; Medrán (yellow card) 61'; Torres (yellow card) 87'	Report	Ceballos 10', 43'; Carvajal (yellow card) 32'; Nacho (yellow card) 88'	Stadium: Mendizorrotza; Attendance: 19,559; Referee: Alberto Undiano Mallenco

1 October 2017 7	Real Madrid	2–0	Espanyol	Madrid
20:45	Isco 30', 71'; Nacho (yellow card) 36'; Casemiro (yellow card) 77'	Report	Sánchez (yellow card) 65'; Martín (yellow card) 90'	Stadium: Santiago Bernabéu; Attendance: 71,205; Referee: José González González

14 October 2017 8	Getafe	1–2	Real Madrid	Getafe
16:15	Arambarri (yellow card) 34'; Molina 56'; Lacen (yellow card) 85'	Report	Benzema 39'; Kroos (yellow card) 48'; Nacho (yellow card) 58'; Ronaldo 85'; Hernandez (yellow card) 90+4'	Stadium: Coliseum Alfonso Pérez; Attendance: 15,350; Referee: Juan Martínez Munuera

22 October 2017 9	Real Madrid	3–0	Eibar	Madrid
20:45	Oliveira 18' (o.g.); Casemiro (yellow card) 23'; Asensio 28'; Marcelo 82'	Report	Charles (yellow card) 24'	Stadium: Santiago Bernabéu; Attendance: 63,705; Referee: Alfonso Álvarez Izquierdo

29 October 2017 10	Girona	2–1	Real Madrid	Girona
16:15	Stuani 54'; Portu 58'; Aday (yellow card) 87'; Mojica (yellow card) 90+4'	Report	Isco 12'; Modrić (yellow card) 45'	Stadium: Montilivi; Attendance: 13,382; Referee: Alejandro Hernández Hernández

5 November 2017 11	Real Madrid	3–0	Las Palmas	Madrid
20:45	Casemiro 41'; Isco (yellow card) 45', (goal) 74'; Asensio 56'; Kroos (yellow card) 64'	Report	Ximo (yellow card) 79'	Stadium: Santiago Bernabéu; Attendance: 63,326; Referee: José María Sánchez Martínez

18 November 2017 12	Atlético Madrid	0–0	Real Madrid	Madrid
20:45	Savić (yellow card) 34'; Saúl (yellow card) 63'; Koke (yellow card) 70'; Juanfran (yellow card) 77'; Hernandez (yellow card) 82'; Godín (yellow card) 89'	Report	Carvajal (yellow card) 20'; Nacho (yellow card) 82'	Stadium: Wanda Metropolitano; Attendance: 66,591; Referee: David Fernández Borbalán

25 November 2017 13	Real Madrid	3–2	Málaga	Madrid
16:15	Benzema 9'; Casemiro 21'; Marcelo (yellow card) 45'; Ronaldo 76'	Report	Rolán 18'; Peñaranda (yellow card) 29'; Adrián (yellow card) 43'; Castro 58'	Stadium: Santiago Bernabéu; Attendance: 75,671; Referee: Jesús Gil Manzano

2 December 2017 14	Athletic Bilbao	0–0	Real Madrid	Bilbao
20:45	De Marcos (yellow card) 45'; Etxeita (yellow card) 57'	Report	Ramos (yellow card) 11' (yellow-red card) 86'; Casemiro (yellow card) 73'; Carvajal (yellow card) 90+1'; Ronaldo (yellow card) 90+3'	Stadium: San Mamés; Attendance: 44,992; Referee: Antonio Mateu Lahoz

9 December 2017 15	Real Madrid	5–0	Sevilla	Madrid
16:15	Nacho 3'; Ronaldo 22', 31' (pen.); Kroos 38'; Hakimi 42'	Report	J. Navas (yellow card) 31'; Banega (yellow card) 37'	Stadium: Santiago Bernabéu; Attendance: 76,924; Referee: Juan Martínez Munuera

23 December 2017 16	Real Madrid	0–3	Barcelona	Madrid
13:00	Ramos (yellow card) 59'; Carvajal (red card) 63'; Marcelo (yellow card) 83'	Report	Vermaelen (yellow card) 18'; L. Suárez 54'; Messi 64' (pen.); Busquets (yellow card) 88'; Vidal 90+3'	Stadium: Santiago Bernabéu; Attendance: 80,737; Referee: José María Sánchez Martínez

7 January 2018 17	Celta Vigo	2–2	Real Madrid	Vigo
20:45	Wass 33'; Mallo (yellow card) 67'; Gómez 82'; Aspas (yellow card) 88'	Report	Bale 36', 38'; Casemiro (yellow card) 44'; Navas (yellow card) 71'	Stadium: Balaídos; Attendance: 20,895; Referee: Santiago Jaime Latre

13 January 2018 18	Real Madrid	0–1	Villarreal	Madrid
16:15	Carvajal (yellow card) 58'; Vázquez (yellow card) 89'	Report	Bacca (yellow card) 44'; Fornals 87'	Stadium: Santiago Bernabéu; Attendance: 63,477; Referee: Alberto Undiano Mallenco

21 January 2018 19	Real Madrid	7–1	Deportivo La Coruña	Madrid
16:15	Nacho 32', 88'; Bale 42', 58'; Modrić 68'; Ronaldo 78', 84'	Report	Adrián 23'; Andone (yellow card) 38'; Pérez (yellow card) 56'	Stadium: Santiago Bernabéu; Attendance: 63,468; Referee: David Fernández Borbalán

27 January 2018 20	Valencia	1–4	Real Madrid	Valencia
16:15	Mina 58'; Gayà (yellow card) 60'; Parejo (yellow card) 87'	Report	Ronaldo 16' (pen.), 38' (pen.); Bale (yellow card) 52'; Varane (yellow card) 63'; Carvajal (yellow card) 71'; Marcelo 84'; Kroos 89'	Stadium: Mestalla; Attendance: 47,076; Referee: Xavier Estrada Fernández

3 February 2018 21	Levante	2–2	Real Madrid	Valencia
20:45	Doukouré (yellow card) 13'; Ivi (yellow card) 26'; Boateng 42'; Coke (yellow card) 88'; Pazzini 89'	Report	Ramos 11', (yellow card) 21'; Isco 81'; Asensio (yellow card) 84'; Varane (yellow card) 90+1'	Stadium: Ciutat de València; Attendance: 23,542; Referee: Mario Melero López

10 February 2018 22	Real Madrid	5–2	Real Sociedad	Madrid
20:45	Vázquez 1'; Ronaldo 27', 37', 80'; Kroos 34'; Carvajal (yellow card) 49'; Kovačić (yellow card) 90+1'	Report	De la Bella (yellow card) 47'; Bautista 74'; Illarramendi 83'	Stadium: Santiago Bernabéu; Attendance: 63,800; Referee: Alejandro Hernández Hernández

18 February 2018 23	Real Betis	3–5	Real Madrid	Seville
20:45	Mandi 33'; Nacho 37' (o.g.); Barragán (yellow card) 44'; Junior (yellow card) 49'; Loren (yellow card) 61'; León 85'	Report	Carvajal (yellow card) 5'; Asensio 11', 59'; Kovačić (yellow card) 46'; Ramos 50', (yellow card) 55'; Bale (yellow card) 57'; Ronaldo 65'; Casemiro (yellow card) 81'; Benzema 90+2'	Stadium: Benito Villamarín; Attendance: 53,533; Referee: Jesús Gil Manzano

21 February 2018 24	Leganés	1–3	Real Madrid	Leganés
18:45	Bustinza 6'; Rico (yellow card) 51'; Cuéllar (yellow card) 85'; Pérez (yellow card) 86'	Report	Vázquez 11'; Casemiro 29'; Ramos (yellow card) 57', (goal) 90' (pen.)	Stadium: Butarque; Attendance: 11,423; Referee: José Luis González González
Note: The match, originally scheduled for 17 December 2017, was pushed back due to Real Madrid's participation in the 2017 FIFA Club World Cup.

24 February 2018 25	Real Madrid	4–0	Alavés	Madrid
16:15	Ronaldo 44', 61'; Bale 46'; Llorente (yellow card) 82'; Benzema 89' (pen.)	Report	Pérez (yellow card) 5'; Sobrino (yellow card) 20'	Stadium: Santiago Bernabéu; Attendance: 65,228; Referee: Xavier Estrada Fernández

27 February 2018 26	Espanyol	1–0	Real Madrid	Cornellà de Llobregat
20:00	Aarón (yellow card) 81'; Gerard 90+3'	Report	Bale (yellow card) 37'	Stadium: RCDE Stadium; Attendance: 19,805; Referee: José María Sánchez Martínez

3 March 2018 27	Real Madrid	3–1	Getafe	Madrid
20:45	Bale 24'; Nacho (yellow card) 34'; Ronaldo 45', 78'	Report	Rémy (yellow card) 25' (yellow-red card) 47'; Portillo (yellow card) 53', (goal) 65' (pen.)	Stadium: Santiago Bernabéu; Attendance: 55,143; Referee: Mario Melero López

10 March 2018 28	Eibar	1–2	Real Madrid	Eibar
13:00	Ramis (yellow card) 45', (goal) 50'	Report	Bale (yellow card) 30'; Ronaldo 34', 84'	Stadium: Ipurua; Attendance: 6,707; Referee: José Luis Munuera Montero

18 March 2018 29	Real Madrid	6–3	Girona	Madrid
20:45	Ronaldo 11', 47', 64', 90+1'; Carvajal (yellow card) 52'; Vázquez 59'; Bale 86'	Report	Stuani 29', 67'; Mojica (yellow card) 30'; Juanpe 88'; Granell (yellow card) 90+4'	Stadium: Santiago Bernabéu; Attendance: 59,205; Referee: Jesús Gil Manzano

31 March 2018 30	Las Palmas	0–3	Real Madrid	Las Palmas
18:30 (17:30 UTC+1)	Momo (yellow card) 36'; Gálvez (yellow card) 45'; Navarro (yellow card) 51'	Report	Bale 26', 51' (pen.); Benzema 39' (pen.)	Stadium: Gran Canaria; Attendance: 22,785; Referee: Pablo González Fuertes

8 April 2018 31	Real Madrid	1–1	Atlético Madrid	Madrid
16:15	Kroos (yellow card) 14'; Ronaldo 53'; Vázquez (yellow card) 88'	Report	Vitolo (yellow card) 17'; Partey (yellow card) 34'; Griezmann 57'	Stadium: Santiago Bernabéu; Attendance: 78,536; Referee: Xavier Estrada Fernández

15 April 2018 32	Málaga	1–2	Real Madrid	Málaga
20:45	Ricca (yellow card) 36'; Iturra (yellow card) 55'; Rodríguez (yellow card) 81'; Rosales (yellow card) 90+2'; Rolán 90+3'	Report	Isco 29'; Casemiro 63'	Stadium: La Rosaleda; Attendance: 27,117; Referee: Ricardo de Burgos Bengoetxea

18 April 2018 33	Real Madrid	1–1	Athletic Bilbao	Madrid
21:30	Vázquez (yellow card) 46'; Ronaldo 87'; Carvajal (yellow card) 90+2'	Report	Williams 14', (yellow card) 39'; Iturraspe (yellow card) 61'; De Marcos (yellow card) 84'; San José (yellow card) 89'	Stadium: Santiago Bernabéu; Attendance: 59,293; Referee: Juan Martínez Munuera

28 April 2018 34	Real Madrid	2–1	Leganés	Madrid
18:30	Bale 8'; Mayoral 45'	Report	Brašanac 66'; Zaldúa (yellow card) 73'; Gabriel (red card) 90+3'	Stadium: Santiago Bernabéu; Attendance: 59,812; Referee: Ignacio Iglesias Villanueva

6 May 2018 35	Barcelona	2–2	Real Madrid	Barcelona
20:45	L. Suárez 10', (yellow card) 44'; Messi (yellow card) 45', (goal) 52'; Roberto (red card) 45+3'; Rakitić (yellow card) 85'	Report	Nacho (yellow card) 12'; Ronaldo 14'; Varane (yellow card) 31'; Ramos (yellow card) 44'; Bale 72', (yellow card) 76'; Marcelo (yellow card) 77'	Stadium: Camp Nou; Attendance: 97,939; Referee: Alejandro Hernández Hernández

9 May 2018 36	Sevilla	3–2	Real Madrid	Seville
21:30	Ben Yedder 26'; Mercado (yellow card) 42'; Layún 45'; Pizarro (yellow card) 69'; Ramos 84' (o.g.); Escudero (yellow card) 90+5'	Report	Mayoral 87'; Ramos (yellow card) 83', (goal) 90+5' (pen.)	Stadium: Ramón Sánchez Pizjuán; Attendance: 38,524; Referee: Antonio Mateu Lahoz
Note: The match, originally scheduled for 22 April 2018, was moved back because of Sevilla's involvement in the Copa del Rey final.

12 May 2018 37	Real Madrid	6–0	Celta Vigo	Madrid
20:45	Bale 13', 30'; Isco 42'; Hakimi 52'; S. Gómez 74' (o.g.); Kroos 81'	Report	Mallo (yellow card) 84'	Stadium: Santiago Bernabéu; Attendance: 56,583; Referee: Pablo González Fuertes

19 May 2018 38	Villarreal	2–2	Real Madrid	Villarreal
20:45	Roger 70', (yellow card) 88'; Castillejo (yellow card) 79', (goal) 85'; Álvaro (yellow card) 79'; Salem (yellow card) 90+4'	Report	Bale 11'; Ronaldo 32'; Modrić (yellow card) 48'; Casemiro (yellow card) 84'; Kroos (yellow card) 89'	Stadium: Estadio de la Cerámica; Attendance: 18,891; Referee: José María Sánchez Martínez

=== Copa del Rey ===
==== Round of 32 ====
26 October 2017 First leg	Fuenlabrada	0–2	Real Madrid	Fuenlabrada
21:30	F. García (yellow card) 62'; Candela (yellow card) 73' (yellow-red card) 79'; C. Díaz (yellow card) 84'	Report	Asensio 63' (pen.); Vázquez 80' (pen.); Vallejo (red card) 89'	Stadium: Estadio Fernando Torres; Attendance: 7,200; Referee: Ignacio Iglesias Villanueva

28 November 2017 Second leg	Real Madrid	2–2 (4–2 agg.)	Fuenlabrada	Madrid
21:30	Óscar (yellow card) 60'; Mayoral 62', 70'	Report	Milla 25'; Aias (yellow card) 58'; Díaz (yellow card) 83'; Portilla 89'	Stadium: Santiago Bernabéu; Attendance: 49,638; Referee: Pablo González Fuertes

==== Round of 16 ====
4 January 2018 First leg	Numancia	0–3	Real Madrid	Soria
21:00	Diamanka (yellow card) 35' (yellow-red card) 60'; Larrea (yellow card) 38'; Marín (yellow card) 51'; Medina (yellow card) 82'; C. Gutiérrez (yellow card) 88'	Report	Bale 35' (pen.); Vallejo (yellow card) 59'; Isco 89' (pen.); Mayoral 90+1'; Kovačić (yellow card) 90+3'	Stadium: Los Pajaritos; Attendance: 8,787; Referee: Xavier Estrada Fernández

10 January 2018 Second leg	Real Madrid	2–2 (5–2 agg.)	Numancia	Madrid
21:30	Vázquez 10', 59'; Casemiro (yellow card) 87'	Report	Sierra (yellow card) 18'; Guillermo 45', 82'; Dani Calvo (yellow card) 84'	Stadium: Santiago Bernabéu; Attendance: 37,553; Referee: José Luis Munuera Montero

==== Quarter-finals ====
18 January 2018 First leg	Leganés	0–1	Real Madrid	Leganés
21:30	El Zhar (yellow card) 39'; Gumbau (yellow card) 62'; Naranjo (yellow card) 67'	Report	Asensio 89'	Stadium: Butarque; Attendance: 11,327; Referee: José María Sánchez Martínez

24 January 2018 Second leg	Real Madrid	1–2 (2–2 (a) agg.)	Leganés	Madrid
21:30	Benzema 47'; Ramos (yellow card) 80'	Report	Tito (yellow card) 27'; Eraso 31'; Gabriel 55'; Nereo (yellow card) 75'	Stadium: Santiago Bernabéu; Attendance: 46,409; Referee: Jesús Gil Manzano

=== Supercopa de España ===
13 August 2017 First leg	Barcelona	1–3	Real Madrid	Barcelona
22:00	Piqué (yellow card) 27'; Messi (yellow card) 40', (goal) 77' (pen.); Busquets (yellow card) 57'	Report	Casemiro (yellow card) 20'; Bale (yellow card) 41'; Carvajal (yellow card) 41'; Piqué 50' (o.g.); Navas (yellow card) 76'; Ronaldo 80', (yellow card) 80' (yellow-red card) 82'; Asensio 90'	Stadium: Camp Nou; Attendance: 89,514; Referee: Ricardo de Burgos Bengoetxea

16 August 2017 Second leg	Real Madrid	2–0 (5–1 agg.)	Barcelona	Madrid
23:00	Asensio 4'; Benzema 39'	Report	L. Suárez (yellow card) 83'; Mascherano (yellow card) 90+3'	Stadium: Santiago Bernabéu; Attendance: 75,167; Referee: José María Sánchez Martínez

=== UEFA Champions League ===
Madrid joined the competition in the group stage.

==== Group stage ====
Pos	Team	Pld	W	D	L	GF	GA	GD	Pts	Qualification	TOT	RMA	DOR	APO
1	(England) Tottenham Hotspur	6	5	1	0	15	4	+11	16	Advance to knockout phase	—	3–1	3–1	3–0
2	(Spain) Real Madrid	6	4	1	1	17	7	+10	13	Advance to knockout phase	1–1	—	3–2	3–0
3	(Germany) Borussia Dortmund	6	0	2	4	7	13	−6	2 (Note: Head-to-head results: APOEL 1–1 Borussia Dortmund, Borussia Dortmund 1–1 APOEL (tied on head-to-head results, ranked on total goal difference).)	Transfer to Europa League	1–2	1–3	—	1–1
4	(Cyprus) APOEL	6	0	2	4	2	17	−15	2		0–3	0–6	1–1	—

Source: UEFA
Rules for classification: Group stage tiebreakers
Notes:

13 September 2017 1	Real Madrid (Spain)	3–0	(Cyprus) APOEL	Madrid, Spain
20:45	Ronaldo 12', 51' (pen.); Carvajal (yellow card) 52'; Ramos 61'	Report	Sallai (yellow card) 53'; Ebecilio (yellow card) 63'; Farías (yellow card) 90'	Stadium: Santiago Bernabéu; Attendance: 71,060; Referee: Benoît Bastien (France)

26 September 2017 2	Borussia Dortmund (Germany)	1–3	(Spain) Real Madrid	Dortmund, Germany
20:45	Toprak (yellow card) 52'; Aubameyang 54'; Weigl (yellow card) 63'	Report	Bale 18', (yellow card) 29'; Carvajal (yellow card) 39'; Modrić (yellow card) 40'; Ronaldo 49', 79'	Stadium: Westfalenstadion; Attendance: 65,849; Referee: Björn Kuipers (Netherlands)

17 October 2017 3	Real Madrid (Spain)	1–1	(England) Tottenham Hotspur	Madrid, Spain
20:45	Ronaldo (yellow card) 32', (goal) 43' (pen.)	Report	Varane 28' (o.g.); Aurier (yellow card) 43'	Stadium: Santiago Bernabéu; Attendance: 76,589; Referee: Szymon Marciniak (Poland)

1 November 2017 4	Tottenham Hotspur (England)	3–1	(Spain) Real Madrid	London, England
20:45 (19:45 UTC±0)	Alli 27', 56'; Eriksen 65'; M. Dembélé (yellow card) 89'	Report	Ronaldo 80'; Ramos (yellow card) 90+1'	Stadium: Wembley Stadium; Attendance: 83,782; Referee: Cüneyt Çakır (Turkey)

21 November 2017 5	APOEL (Cyprus)	0–6	(Spain) Real Madrid	Nicosia, Cyprus
20:45 (21:45 UTC+2)		Report	Modrić 23'; Benzema 39', 45+1'; Nacho 41'; Ronaldo 49', 54'; Carvajal (yellow card) 90'	Stadium: GSP Stadium; Attendance: 19,705; Referee: Artur Soares Dias (Portugal)

6 December 2017 6	Real Madrid (Spain)	3–2	(Germany) Borussia Dortmund	Madrid, Spain
20:45	Mayoral 8'; Ronaldo 12'; Vázquez 81'	Report	Bartra (yellow card) 16'; Aubameyang 43', 49'	Stadium: Santiago Bernabéu; Attendance: 73,323; Referee: Pavel Královec (Czech Republic)

==== Knockout phase ====
===== Round of 16 =====
14 February 2018 First leg	Real Madrid (Spain)	3–1	(France) Paris Saint-Germain	Madrid, Spain
20:45	Isco (yellow card) 32'; Ronaldo 45' (pen.), 83'; Nacho (yellow card) 78'; Marcelo 86'	Report	Neymar (yellow card) 14'; Lo Celso (yellow card) 25'; Rabiot 33', (yellow card) 64'; Meunier (yellow card) 90'	Stadium: Santiago Bernabéu; Attendance: 78,158; Referee: Gianluca Rocchi (Italy)

6 March 2018 Second leg	Paris Saint-Germain (France)	1–2 (2–5 agg.)	(Spain) Real Madrid	Paris, France
20:45	Verratti (yellow card) 20' (yellow-red card) 66'; Cavani 70', (yellow card) 84'	Report	Kovačić (yellow card) 32'; Ronaldo 51'; Ramos (yellow card) 78'; Casemiro 80'	Stadium: Parc des Princes; Attendance: 46,585; Referee: Felix Brych (Germany)

===== Quarter-finals =====
3 April 2018 First leg	Juventus (Italy)	0–3	(Spain) Real Madrid	Turin, Italy
20:45	Bentancur (yellow card) 27'; Dybala (yellow card) 45' (yellow-red card) 66'	Report	Ronaldo 3', 64'; Ramos (yellow card) 55'; Marcelo 72'; Kovačić (yellow card) 88'	Stadium: Juventus Stadium; Attendance: 40,849; Referee: Cüneyt Çakır (Turkey)

11 April 2018 Second leg	Real Madrid (Spain)	1–3 (4–3 agg.)	(Italy) Juventus	Madrid, Spain
20:45	Carvajal (yellow card) 22'; Marcelo (yellow card) 81'; Ronaldo 90+8' (pen.), (yellow card) 90+8'	Report	Mandžukić 2', 37', (yellow card) 29'; Pjanić (yellow card) 17'; Lichtsteiner (yellow card) 36'; Matuidi 61'; Alex Sandro (yellow card) 67'; Costa (yellow card) 73'; Benatia (yellow card) 90'; Buffon (red card) 90+3'	Stadium: Santiago Bernabéu; Attendance: 75,796; Referee: Michael Oliver (England)

===== Semi-finals =====
25 April 2018 First leg	Bayern Munich (Germany)	1–2	(Spain) Real Madrid	Munich, Germany
20:45	Kimmich 28'; Ribéry (yellow card) 52'; Thiago (yellow card) 89'	Report	Marcelo 44'; Asensio 57'; Casemiro (yellow card) 78'	Stadium: Allianz Arena; Attendance: 70,000; Referee: Björn Kuipers (Netherlands)

1 May 2018 Second leg	Real Madrid (Spain)	2–2 (4–3 agg.)	(Germany) Bayern Munich	Madrid, Spain
20:45	Benzema 11', 46'; Modrić (yellow card) 62'; Vázquez (yellow card) 65'; Varane (yellow card) 88'; Casemiro (yellow card) 89'	Report	Kimmich 3'; Rodríguez 63'	Stadium: Santiago Bernabéu; Attendance: 77,459; Referee: Cüneyt Çakır (Turkey)

===== Final =====
26 May 2018 Final	Real Madrid (Spain)	3–1	(England) Liverpool	Kyiv, Ukraine
20:45 (21:45 UTC+3)	Benzema 51'; Bale 64', 83'	Report	Mané 55', (yellow card) 82'	Stadium: NSC Olimpiyskiy Stadium; Attendance: 61,561; Referee: Milorad Mažić (Serbia)

=== UEFA Super Cup ===
8 August 2017	Real Madrid (Spain)	2–1	(England) Manchester United	Skopje, Macedonia
20:45	Casemiro 24'; Isco 52'; Carvajal (yellow card) 84'; Ramos (yellow card) 86'	Report	Lingard (yellow card) 42'; Lukaku 62'; Rashford (yellow card) 90+4'	Stadium: Philip II Arena; Attendance: 30,421; Referee: Gianluca Rocchi (Italy)

=== FIFA Club World Cup ===
Madrid joined the competition in the semi-finals.

13 December 2017 Semi-finals	Al-Jazira (United Arab Emirates)	1–2	(Spain) Real Madrid	Abu Dhabi, United Arab Emirates
21:00 (UTC+4)	Romarinho 41'; Ayed (yellow card) 68'	Report	Ronaldo 53'; Bale 81'	Stadium: Zayed Sports City Stadium; Attendance: 36,650; Referee: Sandro Ricci (Brazil)

16 December 2017 Final	Real Madrid (Spain)	1–0	(Brazil) Grêmio	Abu Dhabi, United Arab Emirates
21:00 (UTC+4)	Casemiro (yellow card) 27'; Ronaldo 53'	Report		Stadium: Zayed Sports City Stadium; Attendance: 41,094; Referee: César Ramos (Mexico)

== Statistics ==
=== Squad statistics ===
As of 26 May 2018

No.	Pos	Nat	Player	Total		La Liga		Copa del Rey		Supercopa de España		Champions League		Super Cup		Club World Cup	
No.	Pos	Nat	Player	Apps	Goals	Apps	Goals	Apps	Goals	Apps	Goals	Apps	Goals	Apps	Goals	Apps	Goals
1	GK	(Costa Rica) CRC	Keylor Navas	44	0	27	0	1	0	2	0	11	0	1	0	2	0
2	DF	(Spain) ESP	Dani Carvajal	41	0	25	0	4	0	2	0	8	0	1	0	1	0
4	DF	(Spain) ESP	Sergio Ramos	42	5	26	4	1	0	2	0	11	1	1	0	1	0
5	DF	(France) FRA	Raphaël Varane	44	0	27	0	1	0	2	0	11	0	1	0	2	0
12	DF	(Brazil) BRA	Marcelo	44	5	26+2	2	0	0	2	0	11	3	1	0	2	0
8	MF	(Germany) GER	Toni Kroos	43	5	26+1	5	0	0	2	0	10+2	0	1	0	1	0
10	MF	(Croatia) CRO	Luka Modrić	43	2	23+3	1	2	0	1	0	11	1	1	0	2	0
14	MF	(Brazil) BRA	Casemiro	48	7	30	5	1	0	2	0	11+1	1	1	1	2	0
7	FW	(Portugal) POR	Cristiano Ronaldo	44	44	27	26	0	0	1	1	13	15	1	0	2	2
9	FW	(France) FRA	Karim Benzema	47	12	25+7	5	1	1	2	1	8+1	5	1	0	2	0
11	FW	(Wales) WAL	Gareth Bale	39	21	20+6	16	2	1	1	0	3+4	3	1	0	2	1
13	GK	(Spain) ESP	Kiko Casilla	17	0	10	0	5	0	0	0	2	0	0	0	0	0
6	DF	(Spain) ESP	Nacho	42	4	22+5	3	6	0	0	0	6+2	1	0	0	1	0
22	MF	(Spain) ESP	Isco	49	9	21+9	7	4	1	1	0	10+1	0	1	1	2	0
20	FW	(Spain) ESP	Marco Asensio	54	11	19+14	6	5	2	2	2	3+9	1	1	0	1	0
17	FW	(Spain) ESP	Lucas Vázquez	53	8	16+17	4	5	3	2	0	5+5	1	1	0	2	0
23	MF	(Croatia) CRO	Mateo Kovačić	36	0	10+11	0	5	0	2	0	4+3	0	0	0	1	0
15	DF	(France) FRA	Théo Hernandez	23	0	10+3	0	6	0	1	0	3	0	0	0	0	0
19	DF	(Morocco) MAR	Achraf Hakimi	17	2	8+1	2	5	0	0	0	2	0	0	0	1	0
3	DF	(Spain) ESP	Jesús Vallejo	12	0	7	0	4	0	0	0	1	0	0	0	0	0
18	MF	(Spain) ESP	Marcos Llorente	20	0	5+8	0	6	0	0	0	1	0	0	0	0	0
24	MF	(Spain) ESP	Dani Ceballos	22	2	4+8	2	5	0	1	0	0+4	0	0	0	0	0
21	FW	(Spain) ESP	Borja Mayoral	24	7	3+11	3	6	3	0	0	4	1	0	0	0	0
30	GK	(France) FRA	Luca Zidane	1	0	1	0	0	0	0	0	0	0	0	0	0	0
27	DF	(Spain) ESP	Álvaro Tejero	2	0	0	0	2	0	0	0	0	0	0	0	0	0
29	MF	(Argentina) ARG	Francisco Feuillassier	2	0	0	0	2	0	0	0	0	0	0	0	0	0
31	DF	(Dominican Republic) DOM	Luismi Quezada	1	0	0	0	1	0	0	0	0	0	0	0	0	0
32	MF	(Spain) ESP	Óscar Rodríguez	1	0	0	0	1	0	0	0	0	0	0	0	0	0
38	MF	(Spain) ESP	Jaime Seoane	1	0	0	0	1	0	0	0	0	0	0	0	0	0

=== Goals ===
As of 26 May 2018

Rank	Player	Position	La Liga	Copa del Rey	UEFA CL	Other^{1}	Total
1	(Portugal) Cristiano Ronaldo	FW	26	0	15	3	44
2	(Wales) Gareth Bale	FW	16	1	3	1	21
3	(France) Karim Benzema	FW	5	1	5	1	12
4	(Spain) Marco Asensio	FW	6	2	1	2	11
5	(Spain) Isco	MF	7	1	0	1	9
6	(Spain) Lucas Vázquez	FW	4	3	1	0	8
7	(Brazil) Casemiro	MF	5	0	1	1	7
7	(Spain) Borja Mayoral	FW	3	3	1	0	7
9	(Germany) Toni Kroos	MF	5	0	0	0	5
9	(Brazil) Marcelo	DF	2	0	3	0	5
9	(Spain) Sergio Ramos	DF	4	0	1	0	5
12	(Spain) Nacho	DF	3	0	1	0	4
13	(Spain) Dani Ceballos	MF	2	0	0	0	2
13	(Morocco) Achraf Hakimi	DF	2	0	0	0	2
13	(Croatia) Luka Modrić	MF	1	0	1	0	2
Own goals			3	0	0	1	4
Total			94	11	33	10	148

^{1} Includes 2017 UEFA Super Cup, 2017 Supercopa de España and 2017 FIFA Club World Cup.

=== Clean sheets ===
As of 26 May 2018

Rank	Name	La Liga	Copa del Rey	UEFA CL	Other^{1}	Total
1	(Costa Rica) Keylor Navas	7	0	2	2	11
2	(Spain) Kiko Casilla	3	3	1	0	7
Total		10	3	3	2	18

^{1} Includes 2017 UEFA Super Cup, 2017 Supercopa de España and 2017 FIFA Club World Cup.

=== Disciplinary record ===
N	P	Nat.	Name	La Liga			Copa del Rey			UEFA CL			Other^{1}			Total			Notes
N	P	Nat.	Name	Yellow card	Second yellow card	Red card	Yellow card	Second yellow card	Red card	Yellow card	Second yellow card	Red card	Yellow card	Second yellow card	Red card	Yellow card	Second yellow card	Red card	Notes
2	DF	(Spain)	Dani Carvajal	11		1				4			2			17		1	
12	DF	(Brazil)	Marcelo	3		1				1						4		1	
3	DF	(Spain)	Jesús Vallejo				1		1							1		1	
4	DF	(Spain)	Sergio Ramos	7	2		1			3			1			12	2		
7	FW	(Portugal)	Cristiano Ronaldo	1						1				1		2	1		
14	MF	(Brazil)	Casemiro	8			1			2			2			13			
6	DF	(Spain)	Nacho	7						1						8			
11	FW	(Wales)	Gareth Bale	5						1			1			7			
10	MF	(Croatia)	Luka Modrić	3						2						5			
23	MF	(Croatia)	Mateo Kovačić	2			1			2						5			
5	DF	(France)	Raphaël Varane	3						1						4			
8	MF	(Germany)	Toni Kroos	4												4			
17	MF	(Spain)	Lucas Vázquez	3						1						4			
1	GK	(Costa Rica)	Keylor Navas	1									1			2			
20	FW	(Spain)	Marco Asensio	2												2			
22	MF	(Spain)	Isco	1						1						2			
15	DF	(France)	Théo Hernandez	1												1			
18	MF	(Spain)	Marcos Llorente	1												1			
32	MF	(Spain)	Óscar Rodríguez				1									1			

Last updated: 26 May 2018
Source: Matches
Ordered by (red card) , (second yellow card) and (yellow card)
(yellow card) = Number of bookings; (second yellow card) = Number of sending offs after a second yellow card; (red card) = Number of sending offs by a direct red card.

^{1} Includes 2017 UEFA Super Cup, 2017 Supercopa de España and 2017 FIFA Club World Cup.
