= Nacho (footballer, born 1990) =

Spanish footballer

Nacho Fernández
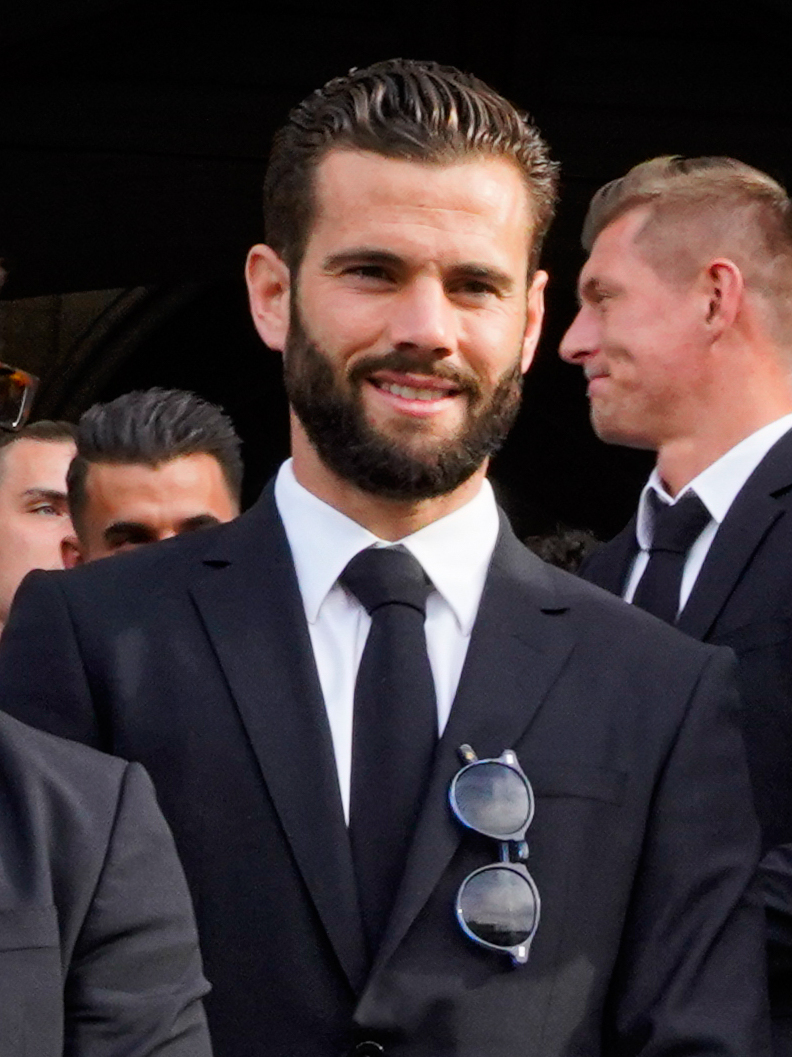
- Nacho in 2022

Personal information
- Full name: José Ignacio Fernández Iglesias
- Date of birth: 18 January 1990 (age 36)
- Place of birth: Madrid, Spain
- Height: 1.80 m (5 ft 11 in)
- Positions: Centre-back; full-back

Team information
- Current team: Al-Qadsiah
- Number: 6

Youth career
- 2001–2009: Real Madrid

Senior career*
Years	Team	Apps	(Gls)
2009–2013	Real Madrid B	105	(4)
2011–2024	Real Madrid	242	(12)
2024–	Al-Qadsiah	73	(0)

International career
2005	Spain U16	1	(0)
2006–2007	Spain U17	11	(0)
2008–2009	Spain U19	9	(2)
2011–2013	Spain U21	6	(0)
2013–2024	Spain	29	(1)
Medal record
Men's football
Representing Spain
UEFA European Championship
Winner	2024 Germany	Team
UEFA Nations League
Winner	2023 Netherlands	Team
UEFA European Under-21 Championship
Winner	2013 Israel	Team
UEFA European Under-17 Championship
Winner	2007 Belgium	Team
FIFA U-17 World Cup
Runner-up	2007 Korea	Team
- * Club domestic league appearances and goals as of 23:12, 9 October 2026 (UTC)

José Ignacio Fernández Iglesias (Spanish pronunciation: [xoˈse jɣˈnaθjo feɾˈnandeθ iˈɣlesjas]; born 18 January 1990), known as Nacho Fernández or simply Nacho (Spanish pronunciation: [ˈnatʃo]), is a Spanish professional footballer who plays as a defender for Saudi Pro League club Al-Qadsiah. Mainly a centre-back, he has also played at right-back and left-back on occasion.

He spent most of his career with Real Madrid after making his debut with the first team in 2011, making 364 appearances and winning several trophies, including a joint record six Champions Leagues, a record shared with Paco Gento, Luka Modrić, Toni Kroos and Dani Carvajal. Nacho won 26 trophies at Real Madrid, making him the second-most decorated player in the club's history. After over a decade at the club, he moved to Saudi Arabia and signed for Al-Qadsiah in 2024.

Nacho won his first senior cap for Spain in 2013, and was part of the squad at the 2018 FIFA World Cup and UEFA Euro 2024, winning the latter tournament.

== Club career ==
=== Real Madrid ===
==== Early career ====
Born in Madrid, Nacho arrived in Real Madrid's youth system at the age of 11. He made his senior debut in 2008–09, playing two games with the reserves in Segunda División B and subsequently appearing in a further two full seasons in that level; it was during this time he formed a long-lasting friendship with future Russian national team player Denis Cheryshev.

On 23 April 2011, Nacho made his first-team – and La Liga – debut, starting as a left back in a 6–3 away win against Valencia and playing in the entire match. His second appearance came the following week, in a 2–3 home loss to Real Zaragoza.

==== 2012–2017: Establishment and success ====
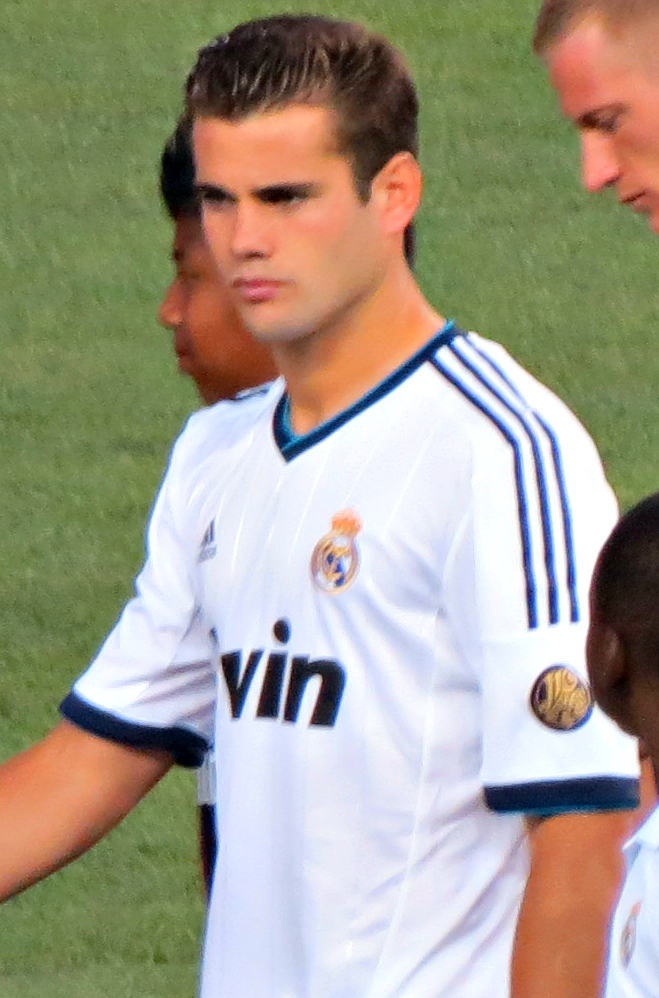
Nacho with Real Madrid in 2012

On 2 September 2012, main squad manager José Mourinho announced that Nacho, along with Álvaro Morata and Jesús, would be promoted to the first team but continue to play with Castilla. He became an official full-time member at the start of 2013–14, receiving the number 18 shirt after the departure of Raúl Albiol.

On 3 July 2014, Nacho signed a new contract with Real Madrid until 2021. He scored his first official goal for them on 10 January of the following year, closing the score in a 3–0 home victory against Espanyol.

Two minutes after replacing the injured Marcelo in a UEFA Champions League group stage match against Paris Saint-Germain on 3 November 2015, Nacho scored the only goal and sealed his team's advance to the knockout stage with his first goal in a European competition. He contributed with five appearances, as the tournament ended in conquest.

On 11 February 2017, Nacho made his 100th appearance for Real Madrid in a 3–1 away win against Osasuna. Benefitting from injuries and suspensions to teammates, he was the most utilized player in the centre-back position as the club won its first national championship in five years; he added four matches in the Champions League, again conquered by his team.

==== 2018–2024: Rise to leadership, contract extensions, most trophies and departure ====
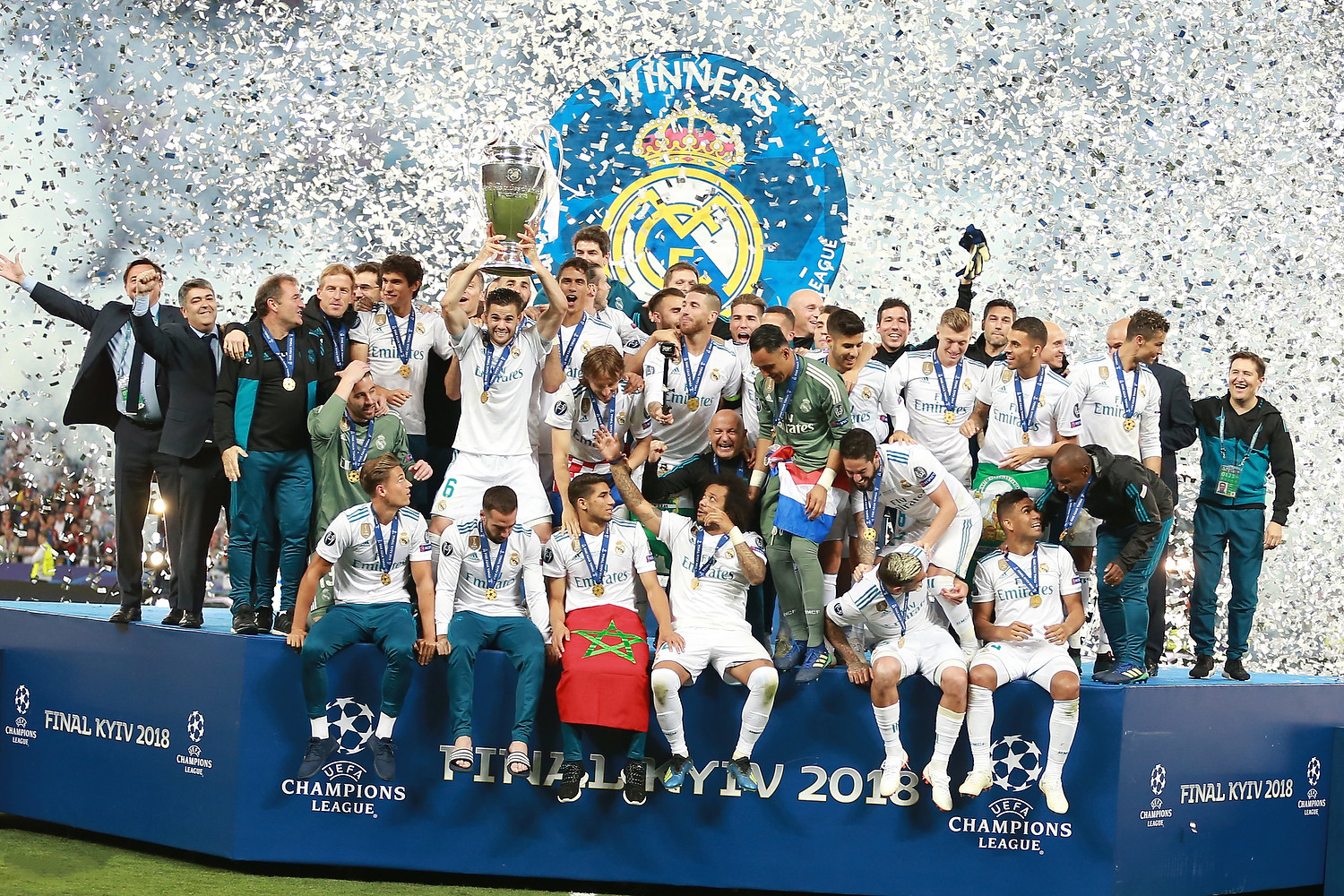
Nacho hoisting the European Champion Clubs' Cup as Real Madrid celebrate winning the UEFA Champions League, in May 2018

Nacho scored his first career brace on 21 January 2018, in a 7–1 win over Deportivo La Coruña. During that year's Champions League he made eight appearances while scoring one goal, when Madrid won their third consecutive and 13th overall title in the tournament; in the decisive match against Liverpool, he featured at right-back after replacing the injured Dani Carvajal late into the first half of an eventual 3–1 win in Kyiv.

The 2019–20 season for Nacho was dominated by injuries, and he only made six appearances during the league season as Real Madrid won the 2019–20 La Liga. In July 2021, he extended his contract for two more years, until 2023.

With departure of Marcelo, Nacho was promoted as Real Madrid's vice-captain for the 2022–23 season. On 22 June 2023, Nacho signed a new contract with Real Madrid, extending his spell until June 2024 and becoming captain following the departure of Karim Benzema.

On 30 September 2023, Nacho was shown a straight red card in stoppage time for a tackle on Girona player Portu. Nacho apologized for his actions after the match. On 21 December 2023, he saw another straight red card for a tackle, this time against Alavés player Samu. With these dismissals, Nacho became the first player to be sent off twice in one season for Real Madrid since Sergio Ramos in 2017–18. On 4 May 2024, he clinched his fourth La Liga title with Real Madrid following a 3–0 victory over Cádiz, thus matching Marcelo, Karim Benzema and Luka Modrić's record as the club's most decorated player with 25 trophies. A month later, on 1 June, he captained his team in a 2–0 win over Borussia Dortmund in the Champions League final, as they clinched their 15th title in the competition making him one of the 5 players to have lifted the European most prestigious trophy a record of 6 times. In addition, he extended his record to 26 titles with the club, same as for Modrić.

On 25 June 2024, Nacho announced that he left Real Madrid after 13 years in the club.

=== Al-Qadsiah ===
On 27 June 2024, Nacho signed a two-year contract with newly-promoted Saudi Pro League side Al-Qadsiah.

== International career ==
=== Youth career ===
Nacho represented at under-17, under-19 and under-21 levels. He was a member of the Spanish squad that won the 2013 UEFA European Under-21 Championship, playing once in a 3–0 win over the Netherlands in Group B.

=== Senior career ===
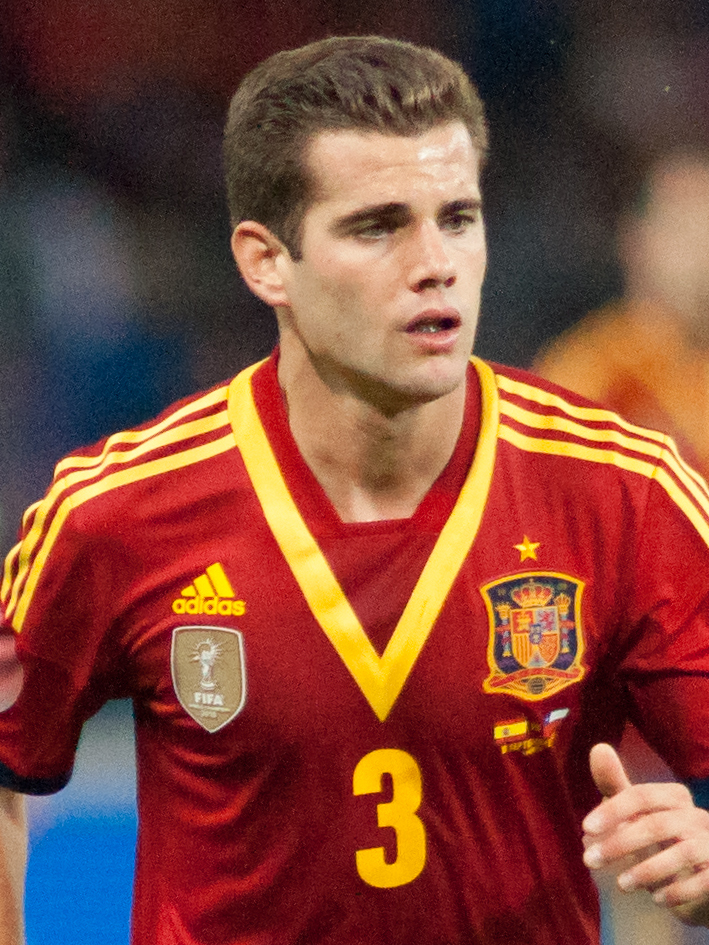
Nacho during his debut with Spain in 2013

On 2 September 2013, Nacho was called up to the Spain senior team for the first time, replacing the injured Iñigo Martínez in the squad for a friendly match against Switzerland. He made his debut by replacing Real Madrid teammate Sergio Ramos early into the second half of the 2–2 draw against Chile in Geneva.

Nacho was named in Spain's final squad for the 2018 FIFA World Cup. He started the team's opening Group B game against Portugal at right-back on 15 June, scoring his first international goal with a curled shot from 30 meters in a 3–3 draw. After being an unused substitute in the team's second and third group fixtures, he started Spain's round of 16 match against hosts Russia on 1 July. He played 70 minutes before being substituted for club teammate Dani Carvajal in Spain's eventual 4–3 penalty shootout loss.

In March 2023, Nacho was recalled to the Spain squad for the first time since 2018 for UEFA Euro 2024 qualifiers against Norway and Scotland. He was named in the starting line-up for the match against Norway, playing the full 90 minutes as Spain won 3–0 in Malaga.

He was named in Spain's squad for the 2023 UEFA Nations League Finals and appeared as a 78th-minute substitute as the team beat Croatia via a penalty shootout in the final as Spain won their first major title in 11 years.

In June 2024, Nacho was named in Spain's squad for the UEFA Euro 2024 finals in Germany. He started the team's first group match, playing the full match in central defence as Spain beat Croatia 3–0 at Berlin's Olympiastadion. He eventually featured in Spain's victory against England in the final, becoming one of 12 players who won both youth and senior Euro titles, alongside his teammates Mikel Merino, Ferran Torres, Álvaro Morata and Rodri.

== Style of play ==
A player known for his versatility in every defensive position on the pitch, both Julen Lopetegui and Zinedine Zidane used Nacho as a centre-, right- and left-back. He is seen as a reliable full-back option due to his skills on the ball and penchant for making forward runs down his flank; a fast and agile defender who is known for his work rate, endurance and strength in the air despite not being particularly tall for his position. Apart from his defensive skills, Nacho is also a precise passer of the ball in both short and long distances, with a 89.8% pass completion and accuracy in 2017–18. During the same season, he scored goals from set pieces.

== Personal life ==
Nacho's younger brother, Álex, is also a footballer. A midfielder, he too graduated from Real Madrid's academy, and both made their first-team debut in the same game; Álex moved on, settling at Cádiz, and they played against one another in 2020 and 2023. Their physical appearance is quite dissimilar, owing to Álex's red hair.

In November 2016, Nacho revealed that he has lived with type 1 diabetes since he was 12 years old. Throughout his first five years in the first team, Nacho managed to avoid major injuries, attributing his success to his eating habits and preparation.

Nacho has four children with his wife María Cortés, two daughters and two sons.

== Career statistics ==
=== Club ===
As of match played 9 October 2026

Appearances and goals by club, season and competition
Club	Season	League			National cup (Note: Includes Copa del Rey, King's Cup)		Continental		Other		Total	
Club	Season	Division	Apps	Goals	Apps	Goals	Apps	Goals	Apps	Goals	Apps	Goals
Real Madrid Castilla	2008–09	Segunda División B	2	0	—		—		—		2	0
Real Madrid Castilla	2009–10	Segunda División B	21	1	—		—		—		21	1
Real Madrid Castilla	2010–11	Segunda División B	30	0	—		—		2 (Note: Appearance(s) in Segunda División B play-offs)	0	32	0
Real Madrid Castilla	2011–12	Segunda División B	33	3	—		—		4	0	37	3
Real Madrid Castilla	2012–13	Segunda División	19	0	—		—		—		19	0
Real Madrid Castilla	Total		105	4	—		—		6	0	111	4
Real Madrid	2010–11	La Liga	2	0	0	0	0	0	—		2	0
Real Madrid	2011–12	La Liga	0	0	1	0	0	0	0	0	1	0
Real Madrid	2012–13	La Liga	9	0	3	0	1 (Note: Appearance(s) in UEFA Champions League)	0	0	0	13	0
Real Madrid	2013–14	La Liga	12	0	4	0	3	0	—		19	0
Real Madrid	2014–15	La Liga	14	1	2	0	6	0	0	0	22	1
Real Madrid	2015–16	La Liga	16	0	1	0	5	1	—		22	1
Real Madrid	2016–17	La Liga	28	2	5	1	4	0	2 (Note: Appearance(s) in FIFA Club World Cup)	0	39	3
Real Madrid	2017–18	La Liga	27	3	6	0	8	1	1	0	42	4
Real Madrid	2018–19	La Liga	20	0	5	0	5	0	0	0	30	0
Real Madrid	2019–20	La Liga	6	1	3	1	1	0	0	0	10	2
Real Madrid	2020–21	La Liga	24	1	0	0	8	0	1 (Note: Appearance(s) in Supercopa de España)	0	33	1
Real Madrid	2021–22	La Liga	28	3	3	0	9	0	2	0	42	3
Real Madrid	2022–23	La Liga	27	1	5	0	8	0	4 (Note: Two appearances in Supercopa de España, two appearances in FIFA Club World Cup)	0	44	1
Real Madrid	2023–24	La Liga	29	0	2	0	12	0	2	0	45	0
Real Madrid	Total		242	12	40	2	70	2	12	0	364	16
Al-Qadsiah	2024–25	Saudi Pro League	31	0	5	0	—		—		36	0
Al-Qadsiah	2025–26	Saudi Pro League	34	0	3	1	—		1 (Note: Appearance in Saudi Super Cup)	0	38	1
Al-Qadsiah	2026–27	Saudi Pro League	8	0	1	0	1 (Note: Appearance in AFC Champions League Elite)	0	0	0	10	0
Al-Qadsiah	Total		73	0	9	1	1	0	1	0	84	1
Career total			420	16	49	3	71	2	19	0	559	21

=== International ===
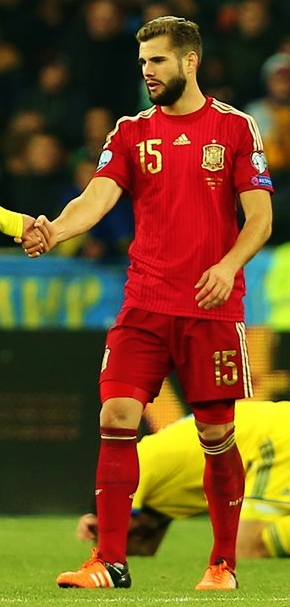
Nacho playing for Spain in 2015

As of match played 14 July 2024

Appearances and goals by national team and year
National team	Year	Apps	Goals
Spain	2013	1	0
Spain	2014	0	0
Spain	2015	1	0
Spain	2016	5	0
Spain	2017	7	0
Spain	2018	8	1
Spain	2019	0	0
Spain	2020	0	0
Spain	2021	0	0
Spain	2022	0	0
Spain	2023	2	0
Spain	2024	5	0
Total		29	1

Scores and results list Spain's goal tally first, score column indicates score after each Nacho goal.

List of international goals scored by Nacho
No.	Date	Venue	Cap	Opponent	Score	Result	Competition
1	15 June 2018	Fisht Olympic Stadium, Sochi, Russia	18	Portugal	3–2	3–3	2018 FIFA World Cup

== Honours ==
Real Madrid Castilla

- Segunda División B: 2011–12 (Group 1); 2012 (overall champions)

Real Madrid

- La Liga: 2016–17, 2019–20, 2021–22, 2023–24
- Copa del Rey: 2013–14, 2022–23
- Supercopa de España: 2012, 2017, 2020, 2022, 2024
- UEFA Champions League: 2013–14, 2015–16, 2016–17, 2017–18, 2021–22, 2023–24
- UEFA Super Cup: 2016, 2017, 2022
- FIFA Club World Cup: 2014, 2016, 2017, 2018, 2022

Spain U17

- UEFA European Under-17 Championship: 2007
- FIFA U-17 World Cup runner-up: 2007

Spain U21

- UEFA European Under-21 Championship: 2013

Spain

- UEFA European Championship: 2024
- UEFA Nations League: 2022–23

=== Individual ===
- Fútbol Draft Silver XI: 2011
- UEFA La Liga Revelation Team of the Year: 2016–17
- Real Madrid Gold and Diamonds Badge: 2024
