= Lucas Vázquez =

Spanish footballer (born 1991)

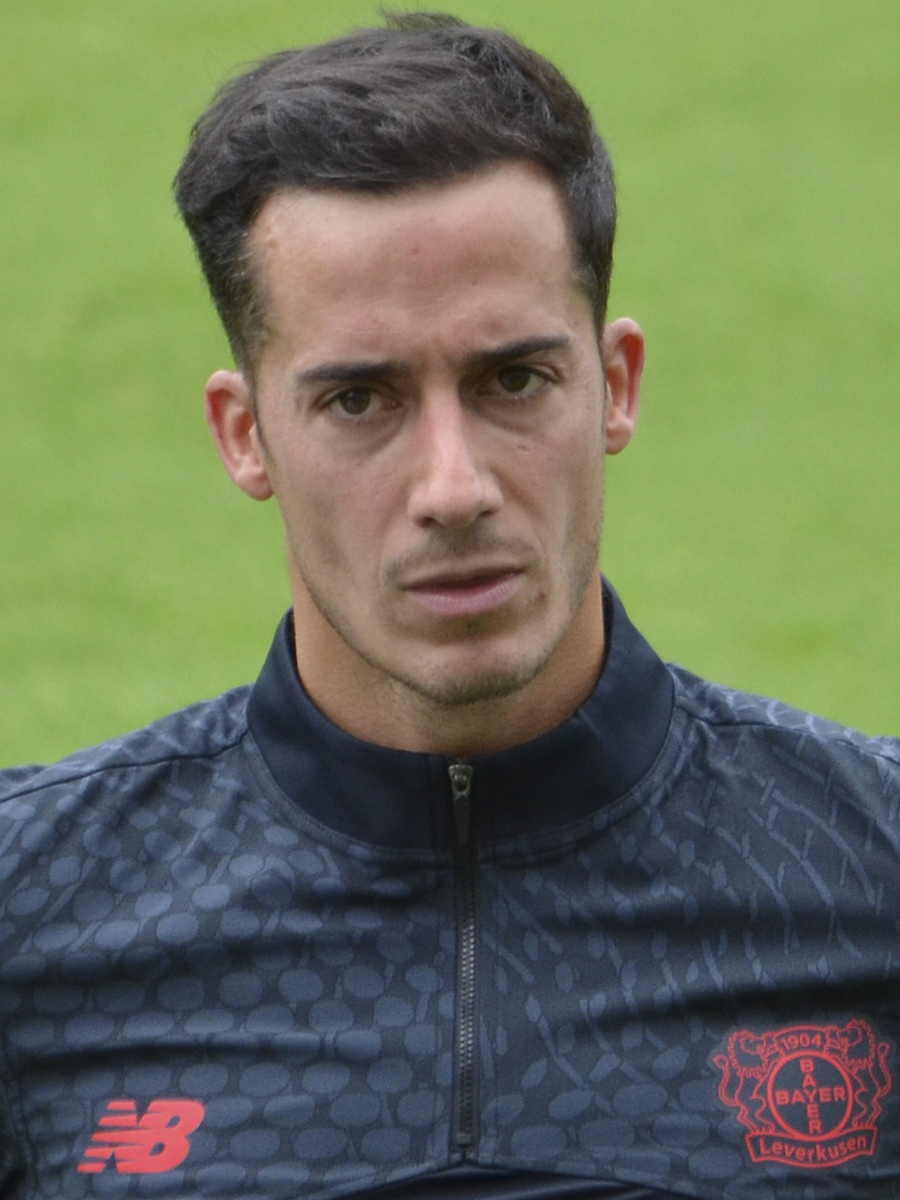
- Vázquez with Bayer Leverkusen in 2025

Personal information
- Full name: Lucas Vázquez Iglesias
- Date of birth: 1 July 1991 (age 35)
- Place of birth: Curtis, Spain
- Height: 1.73 m (5 ft 8 in)
- Positions: Right-back; winger

Team information
- Current team: Bayer Leverkusen
- Number: 17

Youth career
- 2000–2004: Curtis
- 2004–2007: Ural
- 2007–2010: Real Madrid

Senior career*
Years	Team	Apps	(Gls)
2010–2011	Real Madrid C	14	(2)
2011–2015	Real Madrid B	89	(15)
2014–2015	→ Espanyol (loan)	33	(3)
2015–2025	Real Madrid	277	(26)
2025–	Bayer Leverkusen	16	(1)

International career
2016–2018	Spain	9	(0)
- * Club domestic league appearances and goals as of 17:30, 31 October 2026 (UTC)

Lucas Vázquez Iglesias (born 1 July 1991) is a Spanish professional footballer who plays as a right-back or winger for Bundesliga club Bayer Leverkusen.

Starting his career at Real Madrid, Vázquez made his first-team debut in 2015 after a season on loan at Espanyol. He made his La Liga debut with the latter. Since returning to Real Madrid in 2015 he has appeared in more than 400 matches for the club in all competitions and has won 23 major trophies including five Champions Leagues and four La Liga titles. After leaving Real Madrid as a free agent in summer 2025, Vázquez moved to Bundesliga's Bayer Leverkusen.

Vázquez represented Spain at Euro 2016 and the 2018 World Cup.

== Club career ==
=== Early career ===
Born in Curtis, Galicia, Vázquez arrived at Real Madrid's youth system in 2007, aged 16. He made his senior debut in the 2010–11 season with the C-team. He scored four goals in 23 games in the following season to help the reserves return to the Segunda División after a five-year absence. His first goal came on 25 February 2012 in a 2–2 home draw against La Roda.

Vázquez made his first appearance in the second level on 17 August 2012, playing six minutes in a 1–2 away loss against Villarreal. He scored his first professional goal on 15 October, netting the winner in a 3–2 home success over Las Palmas.

==== Loan to Espanyol ====
On 19 August 2014, Vázquez was loaned to La Liga's Espanyol, in a season-long deal. He made his debut in the competition on 30 August, coming on as a second-half substitute for Salva Sevilla in a 1–2 home loss against Sevilla.

Vázquez scored his first goal in the Spanish top flight on 5 October 2014, netting the first in a 2–0 home success over Real Sociedad. On 3 June of the following year, he signed a four-year permanent deal with the Pericos, for a €2 million fee.

=== Return to Real Madrid ===
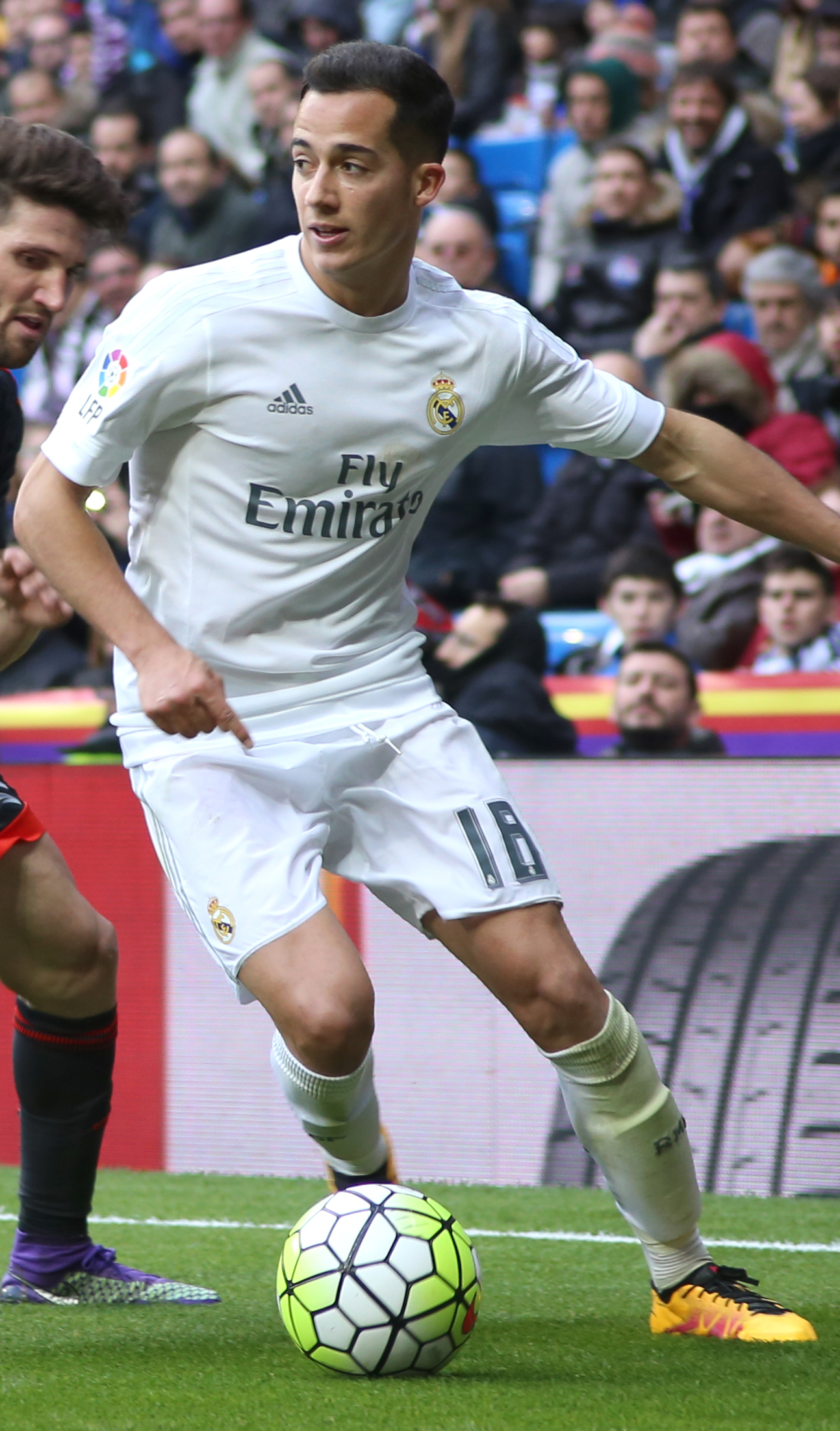
Vázquez playing for Real Madrid in 2016

On 30 June 2015, Real Madrid exercised their buyback clause and Vázquez returned to the club. He made his debut on 12 September in a 6–0 away win over his former team Espanyol, and his first start came a week later, in a 1–0 home defeat of Granada.

Vázquez scored his first competitive goal on 30 December 2015, replacing Karim Benzema for the final 15 minutes of the league fixture against Real Sociedad and netting in a 3–1 success at the Santiago Bernabéu. He contributed with seven appearances in the season's UEFA Champions League, as the tournament ended in a win; in the final against Atlético Madrid, he again came on for the Frenchman late into the second half of a 1–1 draw, and converted his attempt in the penalty shootout triumph.

Vázquez started the 2016 UEFA Super Cup against fellow Spaniards Sevilla, providing an assist to Sergio Ramos in injury time to take the game to extra time, where Real Madrid eventually won 3–2. He signed a new contract on 26 October 2016, running until 2021.

Vázquez appeared 33 times during 2016–17 and scored twice, helping Real Madrid to its first league in five years. He added ten matches in the campaign's Champions League, scoring once in the group stage as his team also conquered the latter tournament.

Vázquez made ten appearances during the 2017–18 Champions League and added one goal, when Real Madrid won their third consecutive and 13th overall title in the competition. In November 2019, Vázquez broke his toe after dropping a weight on it. After returning, he made 18 appearances during the league season, as Real Madrid won the 2019–20 La Liga.

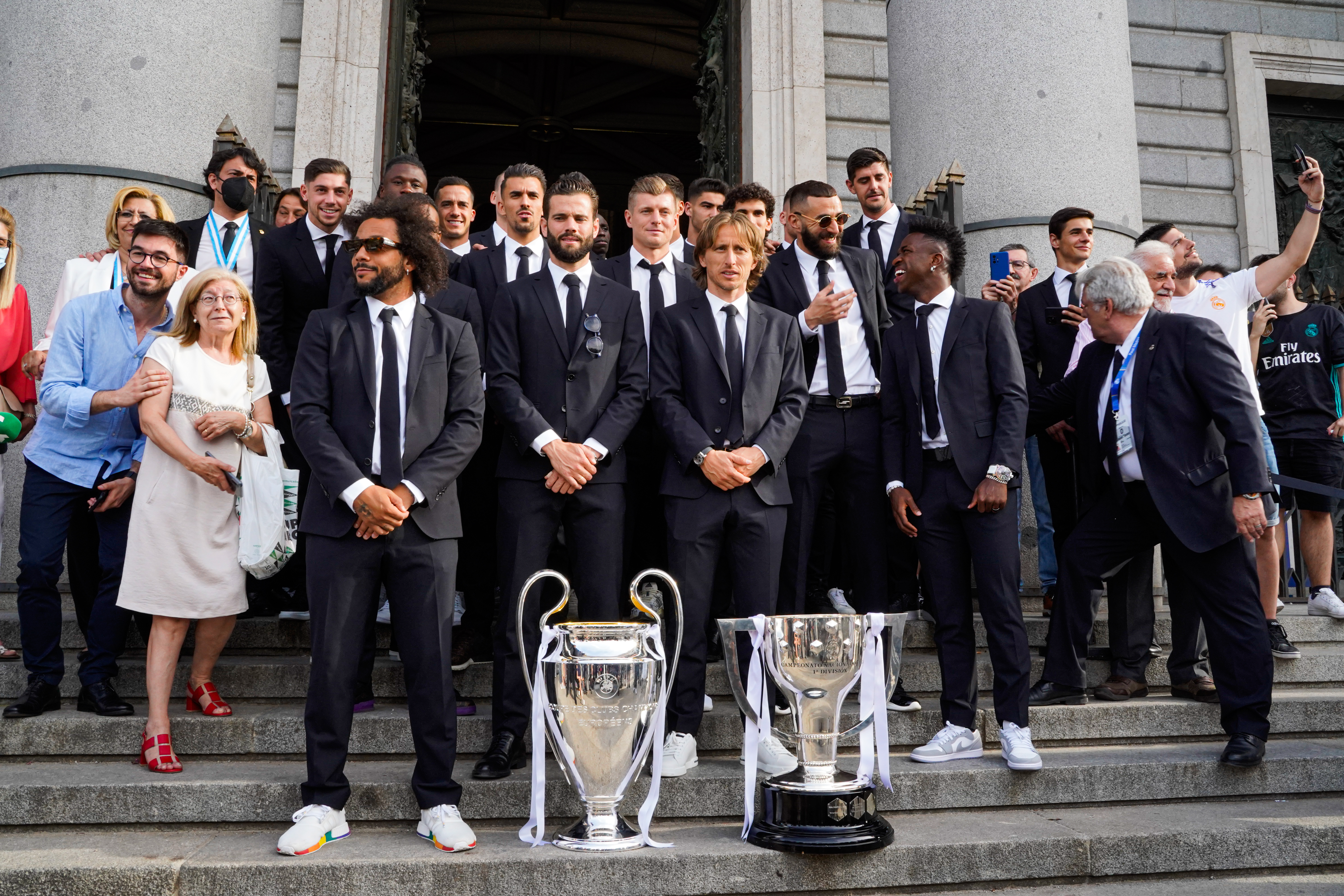
Vázquez with the squad presenting the Champions League trophy to Virgin of Almudena in 2022

Being a regular starter during the 2020–21 season, Vázquez injured himself on 10 April 2021, in a 2–1 El Clásico win over Barcelona and was ruled out for the remainder of the season with a Posterior cruciate ligament injury in his left knee. On 3 June 2021, Vázquez signed a new three-year contract, which would keep him until 2024 at Madrid. On 18 July 2024, Vázquez signed a new one-year contract, which runs until 2025.

On 24 May 2025, Vázquez made his 400th appearance for Real Madrid in a 2–0 win over Real Sociedad in the final match of the 2024–25 season. On 16 July 2025, Vázquez announced that he left Real Madrid after 10 years at the club.

=== Bayer Leverkusen ===
On 26 August 2025, Vázquez joined Bundesliga club Bayer 04 Leverkusen as a free agent, signing a deal valid until 2027. He scored his first goal on 24 January 2026, in a 1–0 win over Werder Bremen in the Bundesliga.

== International career ==
Vázquez did not represent Spain at any youth level. On 17 May 2016 he, Saúl and Sergio Rico were the three uncapped players named in Vicente del Bosque's provisional squad for UEFA Euro 2016 in France, and he also made it to the final list of 23.

He made his debut on 7 June, starting and playing 61 minutes in a 0–1 friendly loss to Georgia at the Coliseum Alfonso Pérez. He appeared once in the tournament, replacing Álvaro Morata in the 70th minute of a 0–2 round-of-16 defeat against Italy at the Stade de France.

He was then included in the final squad for the 2018 FIFA World Cup, making his debut in the competition on 15 June when he replaced David Silva for the final four minutes of the 3–3 group stage draw to Portugal.

== Personal life ==
Vázquez is married to Macarena Rodríguez, with whom he has three children: Lucas Jr., born in 2018, Macarena, born in 2020, and Benji, born in 2023.

== Career statistics ==
=== Club ===
As of match played 5 November 2026

Appearances and goals by club, season and competition
Club	Season	League			National cup (Note: Includes Copa del Rey, DFB-Pokal)		Europe		Other		Total	
Club	Season	Division	Apps	Goals	Apps	Goals	Apps	Goals	Apps	Goals	Apps	Goals
Real Madrid C	2010–11	Tercera División	14	2	—		—		—		14	2
Real Madrid B	2011–12	Segunda División B	23	4	—		—		3 (Note: Appearance(s) in Segunda División B play-offs)	0	26	4
Real Madrid B	2012–13	Segunda División	26	3	—		—		—		26	3
Real Madrid B	2013–14	Segunda División	40	8	—		—		—		40	8
Real Madrid B	Total		89	15	—		—		3	0	92	15
Espanyol (loan)	2014–15	La Liga	33	3	6	1	—		—		39	4
Real Madrid	2015–16	La Liga	25	4	1	0	7 (Note: Appearance(s) in UEFA Champions League)	0	—		33	4
Real Madrid	2016–17	La Liga	33	2	4	1	10	1	3 (Note: One appearance in UEFA Super Cup, two appearances in FIFA Club World Cup)	0	50	4
Real Madrid	2017–18	La Liga	33	4	5	3	10	1	5 (Note: One appearance in UEFA Super Cup, two appearances in Supercopa de España, two appearances in FIFA Club World Cup)	0	53	8
Real Madrid	2018–19	La Liga	31	1	7	3	6	1	3 (Note: One appearance in UEFA Super Cup, two appearances in FIFA Club World Cup)	0	47	5
Real Madrid	2019–20	La Liga	18	2	1	1	4	0	—		23	3
Real Madrid	2020–21	La Liga	24	2	1	0	8	0	1 (Note: Appearance(s) in Supercopa de España)	0	34	2
Real Madrid	2021–22	La Liga	29	3	2	0	8	0	2	0	41	3
Real Madrid	2022–23	La Liga	23	4	1	0	5	0	1	0	30	4
Real Madrid	2023–24	La Liga	29	3	0	0	9	0	0	0	38	3
Real Madrid	2024–25	La Liga	32	1	5	0	10	1	6 (Note: Two appearances in Supercopa de España, one appearance in UEFA Super Cup, one appearance in FIFA Intercontinental Cup, two appearances in FIFA Club World Cup)	0	53	2
Real Madrid	Total		277	26	27	8	77	4	21	0	402	38
Bayer Leverkusen	2025–26	Bundesliga	11	1	2	0	5	0	—		17	1
Bayer Leverkusen	2026–27	Bundesliga	5	0	2	2	4 (Note: Appearance(s) in UEFA Europa League)	0	—		11	2
Bayer Leverkusen	Total		16	1	4	2	9	0	—		28	3
Career total			429	47	36	11	86	4	24	0	575	62

=== International ===
As of match played 20 June 2018

Appearances and goals by national team and year
National team	Year	Apps	Goals
Spain	2016	3	0
Spain	2017	0	0
Spain	2018	6	0
Total		9	0

== Honours ==
Real Madrid Castilla

- Segunda División B: 2011–12

Real Madrid

- La Liga: 2016–17, 2019–20, 2021–22, 2023–24
- Copa del Rey: 2022–23
- Supercopa de España: 2017, 2022
- UEFA Champions League: 2015–16, 2016–17, 2017–18, 2021–22, 2023–24
- UEFA Super Cup: 2016, 2017, 2022, 2024
- FIFA Club World Cup: 2016, 2017, 2018
- FIFA Intercontinental Cup: 2024

=== Individual ===
- EA Sports La Liga Team of the Season: 2020–21
