= 2022 Supercopa de España final =

Final of the 38th edition of Supercopa de España

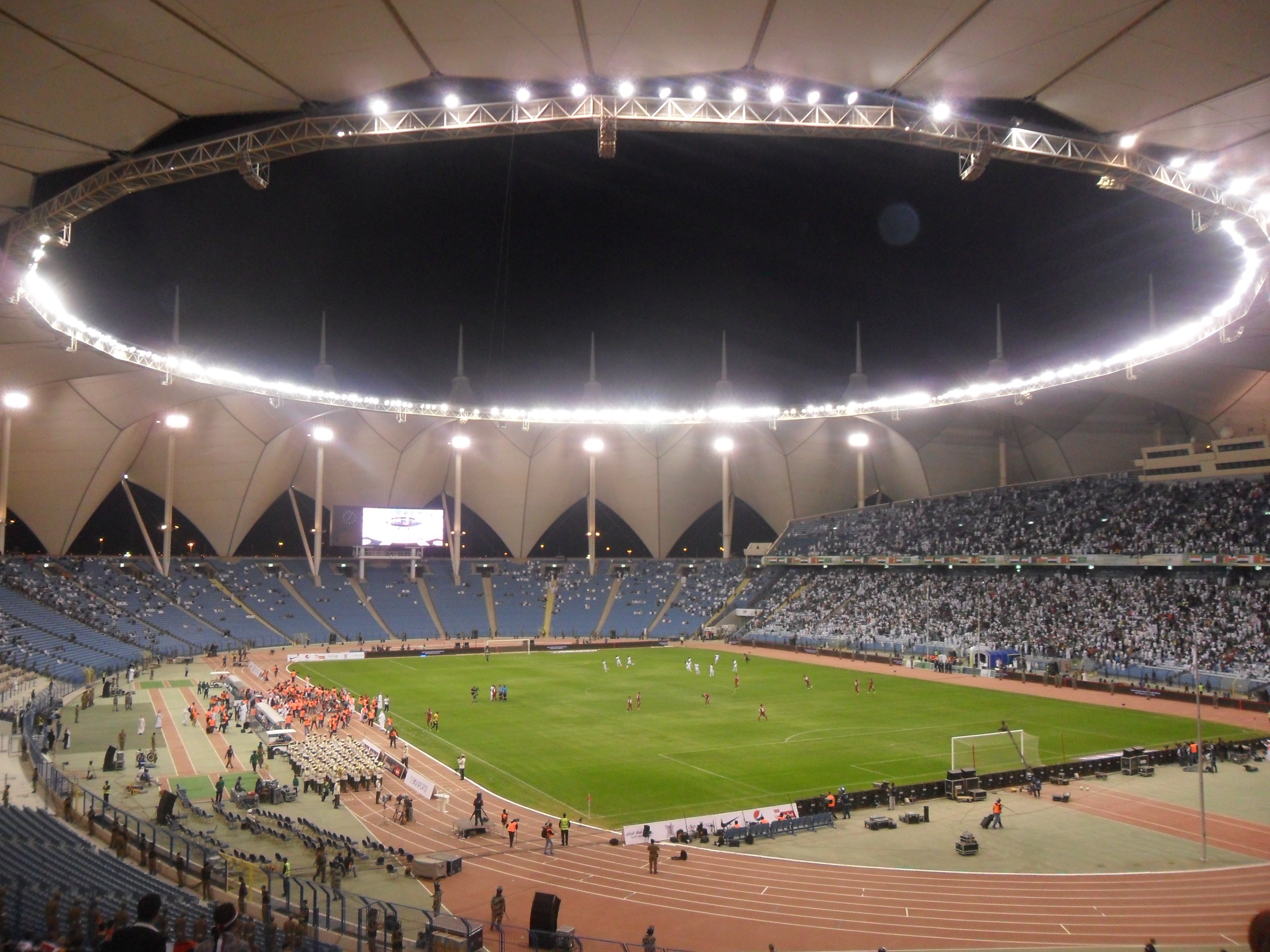
- The King Fahd International Stadium in Riyadh hosted the final.
- Event: 2022 Supercopa de España
Athletic Bilbao	Real Madrid
0	2
- Date: 16 January 2022
- Venue: King Fahd International Stadium, Riyadh
- Man of the Match: Luka Modrić (Real Madrid)
- Referee: César Soto Grado (La Rioja)
- Attendance: 30,000
- Weather: Clear; 18 °C (64 °F); 52% humidity

The 2022 Supercopa de España final decided the winner of the 2022 Supercopa de España, the 38th edition of the annual Spanish football super cup competition. The match was played on 16 January 2022 at the King Fahd International Stadium in Riyadh, Saudi Arabia. The match was a clásico between 2020–21 Copa del Rey runners-up Athletic Bilbao and 2020–21 La Liga runners-up Real Madrid, the first time the clubs had met to directly compete for a trophy since the 1958 Copa del Generalísimo Final.

Real Madrid won the final 2–0 for their 12th Supercopa de España title.

== Teams ==
Team	Qualification for tournament	Previous finals appearances (bold indicates winners)
Athletic Bilbao	2020–21 Copa del Rey runners-up	5 (1983, **1984**, (Note: Athletic Bilbao won the double in 1983–84, and thus were automatically awarded the Supercopa de España title for 1984.) 2009, **2015, 2021**)
Real Madrid	2020–21 La Liga runners-up	16 (1982, **1988**, **1989**, (Note: Real Madrid won the double in 1988–89, and thus were automatically awarded the Supercopa de España title for 1989.) **1990**, **1993**, 1995, **1997**, **2001**, **2003**, 2007, **2008**, 2011, **2012**, 2014, **2017**, **2020**)

== Route to the final ==
Athletic Bilbao		Round	Real Madrid	
Opponent	Result	2021–22 Supercopa de España	Opponent	Result
Atlético Madrid	2–1	Semi-finals	Barcelona	3–2 (a.e.t.)

== Match ==
=== Details ===
16 January 2022
21:30 AST

Athletic Bilbao	0–2	Real Madrid
	Report	Modrić 38'; Benzema 52' (pen.)

King Fahd International Stadium, Riyadh
Attendance: 30,000
Referee: César Soto Grado (La Rioja)

**Athletic Bilbao**	**Real Madrid**

GK	1	(Spain) Unai Simón
RB	18	(Spain) Óscar de Marcos
CB	5	(Spain) Yeray Álvarez	(yellow card) 90'
CB	4	(Spain) Iñigo Martínez
LB	24	(Spain) Mikel Balenziaga		(substituted off) 58'
RM	7	(Spain) Álex Berenguer		(substituted off) 46'
CM	14	(Spain) Dani García	(yellow card) 77'
CM	19	(Spain) Oier Zarraga		(substituted off) 58'
LM	10	(Spain) Iker Muniain (c)		(substituted off) 81'
CF	8	(Spain) Oihan Sancet		(substituted off) 58'
CF	9	(Spain) Iñaki Williams
Substitutes:
GK	26	(Spain) Julen Agirrezabala
DF	12	(Spain) Daniel Vivian
DF	15	(Spain) Iñigo Lekue
DF	17	(Spain) Yuri Berchiche		(substituted on) 58'
DF	21	(Spain) Ander Capa
MF	2	(Spain) Álex Petxarroman
MF	6	(Spain) Mikel Vesga		(substituted on) 58'
MF	23	(Spain) Peru Nolaskoain
MF	33	(Spain) Nico Serrano		(substituted on) 81'
FW	22	(Spain) Raúl García		(substituted on) 58'
FW	30	(Spain) Nico Williams		(substituted on) 46'
Manager:
(Spain) Marcelino			(yellow card) 51'

GK	1	(Belgium) Thibaut Courtois
RB	17	(Spain) Lucas Vázquez		(substituted off) 90+1'
CB	3	(Brazil) Éder Militão	(red card) 87'
CB	4	(Austria) David Alaba
LB	23	(France) Ferland Mendy
DM	14	(Brazil) Casemiro
CM	8	(Germany) Toni Kroos
CM	10	(Croatia) Luka Modrić
RF	21	(Brazil) Rodrygo		(substituted off) 64'
CF	9	(France) Karim Benzema (c)
LF	20	(Brazil) Vinícius Júnior		(substituted off) 86'
Substitutes:
GK	13	(Ukraine) Andriy Lunin
GK	40	(Spain) Toni Fuidias
DF	6	(Spain) Nacho		(substituted on) 90+1'
DF	12	(Brazil) Marcelo		(substituted on) 86'
MF	15	(Uruguay) Federico Valverde		(substituted on) 64'
MF	19	(Spain) Dani Ceballos
MF	22	(Spain) Isco
MF	25	(France) Eduardo Camavinga
FW	7	(Belgium) Eden Hazard
FW	16	(Serbia) Luka Jović
Manager:
(Italy) Carlo Ancelotti

Man of the Match:
Luka Modrić (Real Madrid)

Assistant referees:
Raúl Cabañero Martínez (Region of Murcia)
José Gallego García (Region of Murcia)
Fourth official:
Isidro Díaz de Mera Escuderos (Castilla–La Mancha)
Reserve assistant referee:
Pau Cebrián Devis (Valencian Community)
Video assistant referee:
David Medié Jiménez (Catalonia)
Assistant video assistant referee:
Javier Alberola Rojas (Castilla–La Mancha)

**Match rules**

- 90 minutes.
- 30 minutes of extra time if necessary.
- Penalty shoot-out if scores still level.
- Eleven named substitutes.
- Maximum of five substitutions, with a sixth allowed in extra time. (Note: Each team was given only three opportunities to make substitutions, with a fourth opportunity in extra time, excluding substitutions made at half-time, before the start of extra time and at half-time in extra time.)

== See also ==
- 2021–22 Athletic Bilbao season
- 2021–22 Real Madrid CF season
