= 2021–22 Athletic Bilbao season =

Athletic Bilbao
2021–22 season
- President: Aitor Elizegi
- Head coach: Marcelino
- Stadium: San Mamés
- La Liga: 8th
- Copa del Rey: Semi-finals
- Supercopa de España: Runners-up
- Top goalscorer: League: Iñaki Williams (8); All: Iñaki Williams (8)
- Highest home attendance: 40,698 vs Real Sociedad
- Lowest home attendance: 9,394 vs Barcelona
- Biggest win: Athletic Bilbao 4–0 Real Sociedad
- Biggest defeat: Barcelona 4–0 Athletic Bilbao
Home colours	Away colours	Third colours

The 2021–22 season was the 123rd season in the history of Athletic Bilbao and the club's 91st consecutive season in the top flight of Spanish football. In addition to the domestic league, Athletic Bilbao participated in this season's editions of the Copa del Rey and the Supercopa de España.

The first match of 2022 away to Osasuna was the 4,000th competitive fixture in the club's history (previous such milestones occurring in 1954, 1979 and 2001).

== Players ==
=== First-team squad ===
As of 3 January 2022

Note: Flags indicate national team as defined under FIFA eligibility rules; some limited exceptions apply. Players may hold more than one non-FIFA nationality.

No.	Pos.	Nation	Player
1	GK	ESP	Unai Simón
2	DF	ESP	Álex Petxarroman
3	DF	ESP	Unai Núñez
4	DF	ESP	Iñigo Martínez
5	DF	ESP	Yeray Álvarez
6	MF	ESP	Mikel Vesga
7	FW	ESP	Álex Berenguer
8	MF	ESP	Oihan Sancet
9	FW	ESP	Iñaki Williams
10	FW	ESP	Iker Muniain (captain)
12	DF	ESP	Daniel Vivian
13	GK	ESP	Jokin Ezkieta
14	MF	ESP	Dani García
15	DF	ESP	Iñigo Lekue
16	MF	ESP	Unai Vencedor

No.	Pos.	Nation	Player
17	DF	ESP	Yuri Berchiche
18	MF	ESP	Óscar de Marcos (2nd captain)
19	MF	ESP	Oier Zarraga
20	FW	ESP	Asier Villalibre
21	DF	ESP	Ander Capa
22	FW	ESP	Raúl García (3rd captain)
23	DF	ESP	Peru Nolaskoain
24	DF	ESP	Mikel Balenziaga
26	GK	ESP	Julen Agirrezabala
30	FW	ESP	Nico Williams
31	DF	ESP	Aitor Paredes
32	MF	ESP	Beñat Prados
33	FW	ESP	Nico Serrano
34	FW	ESP	Juan Artola

=== Reserve team ===
Note: Flags indicate national team as defined under FIFA eligibility rules; some limited exceptions apply. Players may hold more than one non-FIFA nationality.

No.	Pos.	Nation	Player
36	FW	ESP	Luis Bilbao

=== Out on loan ===
Note: Flags indicate national team as defined under FIFA eligibility rules; some limited exceptions apply. Players may hold more than one non-FIFA nationality.

No.	Pos.	Nation	Player
—	DF	ESP	Imanol García de Albéniz (at Mirandés until 30 June 2022)
—	FW	ESP	Iñigo Córdoba (at Go Ahead Eagles until 30 June 2022)

No.	Pos.	Nation	Player
—	FW	ESP	Iñigo Vicente (at Mirandés until 30 June 2022)
—	FW	ESP	Jon Morcillo (at Valladolid until 30 June 2022)

== Transfers ==
=== In ===
Date	Player	From	Type	Fee	Ref
30 June 2021	(Spain) Iñigo Córdoba	Alavés	Loan return		
30 June 2021	(Bosnia and Herzegovina) Kenan Kodro	Valladolid	Loan return		
30 June 2021	(Spain) Daniel Vivian	Mirandés	Loan return		
1 July 2021	(Spain) Álex Petxarroman	Real Sociedad B	Transfer	Free	

=== Out ===
Date	Player	To	Type	Fee	Ref
1 July 2021	(Spain) Imanol García de Albéniz	Mirandés	Loan		
1 July 2021	(Spain) Iñigo Vicente	Mirandés	Loan		

== Pre-season and friendlies ==
Win Draw Loss Fixtures

17 July 2021 Friendly	St. Gallen	2–1	Athletic Bilbao	St. Gallen, Switzerland
16:00 CEST (UTC+2)	Besio 19'; Youan 36'	Report	Fazliji 38' (o.g.)	Stadium: Kybunpark; Attendance: 6,261; Referee: David Huwiler

20 July 2021 Friendly	Athletic Bilbao	1–0	Dynamo Kyiv	Winterthur, Switzerland
15:00 CEST (UTC+2)	I. Williams 77'	Report		Stadium: Stadion Schützenwiese; Referee: Mirel Turkes

24 July 2021 Friendly	Borussia Dortmund	0–2	Athletic Bilbao	St. Gallen, Switzerland
16:00 CEST (UTC+2)		Report	R. García 50' (pen.); Vivian 57'; Petxarroman (yellow card) 60'; Vesga (yellow card) 75'	Stadium: Kybunpark; Attendance: 3,527; Referee: Sven Wolfensberger

31 July 2021 Friendly	Union Berlin	2–1	Athletic Bilbao	Berlin, Germany
15:30 CEST (UTC+2)	Haraguchi 74'; Baumgartl 81'	Report	Berenguer 31'	Stadium: Stadion An der Alten Försterei; Referee: Florian Lechner

7 August 2021 Friendly	Southampton	1–3	Athletic Bilbao	Southampton, England
15:00 BST (UTC+1)	Walcott 47'	Report	Vesga 34'; Villalibre 43'; Bednarek 60' (o.g.)	Stadium: St Mary's Stadium; Referee: John Busby

8 August 2021 Friendly	Liverpool	1–1	Athletic Bilbao	Liverpool, England
16:00 BST (UTC+1)	Jota 13'	Report	Berenguer 53'	Stadium: Anfield; Attendance: 40,000; Referee: Mike Dean

== Competitions ==
=== Overall record ===
Competition	First match	Last match	Starting round	Final position	Record							
Competition	First match	Last match	Starting round	Final position	Pld	W	D	L	GF	GA	GD	Win %
La Liga	16 August 2021	22 May 2022	Matchday 1	8th	38	14	13	11	43	36	+7	36.84
Copa del Rey	6 January 2022	2 March 2022	Round of 32	Semi-finals	5	3	1	1	7	4	+3	60.00
Supercopa de España	13 January 2022	16 January 2022	Semi-finals	Runners-up	2	1	0	1	2	3	−1	50.00
Total					45	18	14	13	52	43	+9	40.00

Source: Soccerway

=== La Liga ===
==== League table ====
Pos	Team	Pld	W	D	L	GF	GA	GD	Pts	Qualification or relegation
6	Real Sociedad	38	17	11	10	40	37	+3	62	Qualification for the Europa League group stage (Note: Since the winners of the 2021–22 Copa del Rey, Real Betis, qualified for European competition based on league position, the Europa League berth awarded to the Copa del Rey winners was passed to the sixth-placed team, and the Europa Conference League berth awarded to the sixth-placed team was passed to the seventh-placed team.)
7	Villarreal	38	16	11	11	63	37	+26	59	Qualification for the Europa Conference League play-off round
8	Athletic Bilbao	38	14	13	11	43	36	+7	55	
9	Valencia	38	11	15	12	48	53	−5	48	
10	Osasuna	38	12	11	15	37	51	−14	47	

Source: LaLiga Santander
Rules for classification: 1) Points; 2) Head-to-head points; 3) Head-to-head goal difference; 4) Goal difference; 5) Goals scored; 6) Fair-play points (Note: Head-to-head record is used only after all the matches between the teams in question have been played)

==== Results summary ====
Overall								Home						Away					
Pld	W	D	L	GF	GA	GD	Pts	W	D	L	GF	GA	GD	W	D	L	GF	GA	GD
38	14	13	11	43	36	+7	55	10	4	5	29	18	+11	4	9	6	14	18	−4

Source: La Liga

==== Results by round ====
Round	1	2	3	4	5	6	7	8	9	10	11	12	13	14	15	16	17	18	19	20	21	22	23	24	25	26	27	28	29	30	31	32	33	34	35	36	37	38
Ground	A	H	A	H	A	H	A	H	A	H	A	A	H	A	H	A	H	H	A	A	H	A	H	A	H	A	H	A	H	H	A	H	A	H	H	A	H	A
Result	D	D	W	W	D	L	D	W	L	W	D	D	L	D	D	D	L	W	W	D	L	W	W	L	W	L	W	L	D	W	D	L	W	W	D	L	W	L
Position	12	11	9	5	5	9	10	7	9	8	8	8	8	8	8	9	11	10	10	9	10	9	8	8	8	8	8	8	8	8	8	8	8	8	8	8	8	8

Source: La Liga
A = Away; H = Home; W = Win; D = Draw; L = Loss

==== Matches ====
The league fixtures were announced on 30 June 2021.

16 August 2021 1	Elche	0–0	Athletic Bilbao	Elche
22:00 CEST (UTC+2)	Verdú (yellow card) 6'; Guti (yellow card) 78'	Report	De Marcos (yellow card) 20'; D. García (yellow card) 63'	Stadium: Estadio Manuel Martínez Valero; Attendance: 9,145; Referee: Adrián Cordero Vega

21 August 2021 2	Athletic Bilbao	1–1	Barcelona	Bilbao
22:00 CEST (UTC+2)	Martínez (yellow card) 20', (goal) 50'	Report	García (yellow card) 28', (red card) 90+3'; Depay 75'; Alba (yellow card) 76'	Stadium: San Mamés; Attendance: 9,394; Referee: Juan Martínez Munuera

28 August 2021 3	Celta Vigo	0–1	Athletic Bilbao	Vigo
17:00 CEST (UTC+2)	Méndez (yellow card) 52'; Mallo (yellow card) 90+6'	Report	I. Williams 34'; Simón (yellow card) 90+6'	Stadium: Balaídos; Attendance: 5,492; Referee: Antonio Mateu Lahoz

11 September 2021 4	Athletic Bilbao	2–0	Mallorca	Bilbao
21:00 CEST (UTC+2)	D. García (yellow card) 60'; Vivian 68'; I. Williams 74'	Report	Baba (yellow card) 65'; Sedlar (yellow card) 87'	Stadium: San Mamés; Attendance: 14,566; Referee: Jorge Figueroa Vázquez

18 September 2021 5	Atlético Madrid	0–0	Athletic Bilbao	Madrid
16:15 CEST (UTC+2)	Kondogbia (yellow card) 36'; Félix (yellow card) 78' (yellow-red card) 78'; Savić (yellow card) 79'; Cunha (yellow card) 90'	Report	D. García (yellow card) 30'; N. Williams (yellow card) 82'	Stadium: Wanda Metropolitano; Attendance: 38,798; Referee: Jesús Gil Manzano

21 September 2021 6	Athletic Bilbao	1–2	Rayo Vallecano	Bilbao
22:00 CEST (UTC+2)	Núñez (yellow card) 16'; Ciss 33' (o.g.); Muniain (yellow card) 56'; Martínez (yellow card) 90+4'	Report	Á. García 5'; Catena (yellow card) 7'; Guardiola (yellow card) 42'; Maraš (yellow card) 83'; Falcao 90+6'	Stadium: San Mamés; Attendance: 16,236; Referee: José Luis Munuera Montero

25 September 2021 7	Valencia	1–1	Athletic Bilbao	Valencia
16:15 CEST (UTC+2)	Gómez (yellow card) 45+4' (yellow-red card) 82'; Guillamón (yellow card) 47'; Jason (yellow card) 90+2'; Marcos André 90+5'; Vallejo (yellow card) 90+8'	Report	D. García (yellow card) 49'; Martínez 69'; Berenguer (yellow card) 78'	Stadium: Mestalla; Attendance: 13,680; Referee: Alejandro Hernández Hernández

1 October 2021 8	Athletic Bilbao	1–0	Alavés	Bilbao
21:00 CEST (UTC+2)	R. García (penalty missed) 9', 44', (yellow card) 73'; Vencedor (yellow card) 38'; Berenguer (yellow card) 40'	Report	Navarro (yellow card) 8'; Pina (yellow card) 84'	Stadium: San Mamés; Attendance: 28,665; Referee: Carlos del Cerro Grande

23 October 2021 10	Athletic Bilbao	2–1	Villarreal	Bilbao
21:00 CEST (UTC+2)	R. García 14'; Muniain 77' (pen.); Berenguer (penalty missed) 82'	Report	Coquelin 32'; Foyth (yellow card) 55'; Moreno (yellow card) 76'; Estupiñán (yellow card) 80'	Stadium: San Mamés; Attendance: 38,698; Referee: Guillermo Cuadra Fernández

26 October 2021 11	Espanyol	1–1	Athletic Bilbao	Cornellà de Llobregat
21:00 CEST (UTC+2)	De Tomás 33' (pen.), (red card) 90+3'; Herrera (yellow card) 73'	Report	I. Williams 52'; Berenguer (yellow card) 75'; Yeray (yellow card) 90+3'	Stadium: RCDE Stadium; Attendance: 16,196; Referee: Miguel Ángel Ortiz Arias

31 October 2021 12	Real Sociedad	1–1	Athletic Bilbao	San Sebastián
21:00 CET (UTC+1)	Isak 58' (pen.), (yellow card) 71'; Januzaj (yellow card) 74'; Merino (yellow card) 78'; Guevara (yellow card) 90+3'	Report	Martínez (yellow card) 56' (yellow-red card) 84'; De Marcos (yellow card) 59'; Muniain 90+1'	Stadium: Anoeta; Attendance: 37,066; Referee: Juan Martínez Munuera

5 November 2021 13	Athletic Bilbao	0–1	Cádiz	Bilbao
21:00 CET (UTC+1)	Yeray (yellow card) 27'; Morcillo (yellow card) 69'; N. Williams (yellow card) 90+2'	Report	Salvi 6'; Haroyan (yellow card) 85'	Stadium: San Mamés; Attendance: 37,581; Referee: Santiago Jaime Latre

19 November 2021 14	Levante	0–0	Athletic Bilbao	Valencia
21:00 CET (UTC+1)	Roger (yellow card) 6'; Vezo (yellow card) 90+3'	Report	Yeray (yellow card) 16'	Stadium: Ciutat de València; Attendance: 15,230; Referee: José Luis Munuera Montero

26 November 2021 15	Athletic Bilbao	2–2	Granada	Bilbao
21:00 CET (UTC+1)	R. García 10'; Zarraga (yellow card) 62'; Maximiano 76' (o.g.); Martínez (red card) 90+9'	Report	Machís 25'; Molina 34'; Montoro (yellow card) 40'; Sánchez (yellow card) 77'	Stadium: San Mamés; Attendance: 32,651; Referee: Adrián Cordero Vega

1 December 2021 9	Real Madrid	1–0	Athletic Bilbao	Madrid
21:00 CET (UTC+1)	Benzema 40'; Modrić (yellow card) 68'; Casemiro (yellow card) 77'	Report	Zarraga (yellow card) 31'; Lekue (yellow card) 43'; I. Williams (yellow card) 77'	Stadium: Santiago Bernabéu; Attendance: 33,627; Referee: Isidro Díaz de Mera Escuderos
Note: The match was originally scheduled for 17 October 2021, but was postponed because of the South American 2022 FIFA World Cup qualification matches being postponed due to the COVID-19 pandemic, meaning several players would not be able to return before the match.

6 December 2021 16	Getafe	0–0	Athletic Bilbao	Getafe
21:00 CET (UTC+1)	Djené (yellow card) 15'; Mata (yellow card) 90+5'	Report	Morcillo (yellow card) 90+4'	Stadium: Coliseum Alfonso Pérez; Attendance: 9,176; Referee: Jorge Figueroa Vázquez

11 December 2021 17	Athletic Bilbao	0–1	Sevilla	Bilbao
21:00 CET (UTC+1)	Lekue (yellow card) 52'; D. García (yellow card) 62'; Vencedor (yellow card) 65'; Martínez (yellow card) 90+3'	Report	Delaney 38'; Fernando (yellow card) 73'; Rekik (yellow card) 88'; Koundé (yellow card) 90'	Stadium: San Mamés; Attendance: 36,737; Referee: Alejandro Hernández Hernández

19 December 2021 18	Athletic Bilbao	3–2	Real Betis	Bilbao
16:15 CET (UTC+1)	I. Williams 2', 72'; Zarraga (yellow card) 58'; De Marcos 89'	Report	Juanmi 6'; Fekir (yellow card) 49', (goal) 52'; Rodríguez (yellow card) 58'; Miranda (yellow card) 90+1'	Stadium: San Mamés; Attendance: 38,002; Referee: Jesús Gil Manzano

22 December 2021 21	Athletic Bilbao	1–2	Real Madrid	Bilbao
21:30 CET (UTC+1)	Sancet 10'; Vencedor (yellow card) 43'; D. García (yellow card) 61'	Report	Benzema 4', 7'; Vinícius (yellow card) 42'; Camavinga (yellow card) 62'	Stadium: San Mamés; Attendance: 42,722; Referee: César Soto Grado
Note: The match was originally scheduled for January 2022, but was moved back due to both teams' participation in the 2022 Supercopa de España.

3 January 2022 19	Osasuna	1–3	Athletic Bilbao	Pamplona
21:00 CET (UTC+1)	Kike 10'; José Ángel (yellow card) 66'; Torró (yellow card) 76'; Herrera (yellow card) 78'; Ávila (yellow card) 90+2' (yellow-red card) 90+4'	Report	Sancet 16', 25', 68'; Yeray (yellow card) 66'; Martínez (yellow card) 90+4'	Stadium: El Sadar; Attendance: 16,206; Referee: Miguel Ángel Ortiz Arias

9 January 2022 20	Alavés	0–0	Athletic Bilbao	Vitoria-Gasteiz
18:30 CET (UTC+1)	Lejeune (yellow card) 26'; Duarte (yellow card) 61'	Report		Stadium: Mendizorrotza; Attendance: 14,103; Referee: Santiago Jaime Latre

23 January 2022 22	Rayo Vallecano	0–1	Athletic Bilbao	Madrid
18:30 CET (UTC+1)	López (yellow card) 89'	Report	I. Williams (yellow card) 17'; Serrano 30'; Zarraga (yellow card) 60'; D. García (yellow card) 69'; Simón (yellow card) 82'; Lekue (yellow card) 86'; N. Williams (yellow card) 88'	Stadium: Campo de Fútbol de Vallecas; Attendance: 9,034; Referee: Adrián Cordero Vega

7 February 2022 23	Athletic Bilbao	2–1	Espanyol	Bilbao
21:00 CET (UTC+1)	Sancet 5'; Martínez 16', (yellow card) 90+3'; Vesga (yellow card) 62'; Petxarroman (yellow card) 87'	Report	Vilhena 3'; Morlanes (yellow card) 15'; Gil (yellow card) 75'	Stadium: San Mamés; Attendance: 30,753; Referee: César Soto Grado

14 February 2022 24	Mallorca	3–2	Athletic Bilbao	Palma
21:00 CET (UTC+1)	Oliván (yellow card) 12'; Sevilla 22' (pen.); Ángel 30', (yellow card) 73'; Reina (yellow card) 75'; Raíllo (yellow card) 80'; Simón 88' (o.g.); Kubo (yellow card) 88'; Muriqi (yellow card) 89'	Report	Zarraga (yellow card) 52'; Muniain (yellow card) 57'; R. García 59'; Berenguer 61', (yellow card) 90+2'; Berchiche (yellow card) 79'	Stadium: Visit Mallorca Stadium; Attendance: 12,904; Referee: Isidro Díaz de Mera Escuderos

20 February 2022 25	Athletic Bilbao	4–0	Real Sociedad	Bilbao
21:00 CET (UTC+1)	R. García (yellow card) 5'; Muniain (penalty missed) 32', 89'; Martínez (yellow card) 37'; D. García (yellow card) 55'; Vivian 68'; Sancet 72'; I. Williams 80'; Berenguer (yellow card) 90+4'	Report	Silva (yellow card) 30'	Stadium: San Mamés; Attendance: 40,698; Referee: Juan Martínez Munuera

27 February 2022 26	Barcelona	4–0	Athletic Bilbao	Barcelona
21:00 CET (UTC+1)	Aubameyang 37'; Busquets (yellow card) 48'; Piqué (yellow card) 70'; Dembélé 73'; L. de Jong 90'; Depay 90+4'	Report	Balenziaga (yellow card) 54'	Stadium: Camp Nou; Attendance: 69,770; Referee: Guillermo Cuadra Fernández

7 March 2022 27	Athletic Bilbao	3–1	Levante	Bilbao
21:00 CET (UTC+1)	Berenguer (yellow card) 14'; Vesga 63'; I. Williams 76'; Zarraga 88' (pen.)	Report	Miramón (yellow card) 20'; Son (yellow card) 37'; De Frutos 90+1'	Stadium: San Mamés; Attendance: 29,435; Referee: Alejandro Muñiz Ruiz

13 March 2022 28	Real Betis	1–0	Athletic Bilbao	Seville
16:15 CET (UTC+1)	Iglesias 20'; Pezzella (yellow card) 25'; Miranda (yellow card) 28'; Ruibal (yellow card) 76'; Fekir (red card) 80'; Canales (yellow card) 80'	Report	Berchiche (yellow card) 8'; Berenguer (yellow card) 16'; N. Williams (yellow card) 78'; De Marcos (yellow card) 80'; Sancet (yellow card) 80'	Stadium: Benito Villamarín; Attendance: 45,876; Referee: Antonio Mateu Lahoz

18 March 2022 29	Athletic Bilbao	1–1	Getafe	Bilbao
21:00 CET (UTC+1)	Berchiche 29'; Vesga (yellow card) 79'; De Marcos (yellow card) 88'; Petxarroman (yellow card) 90+3'; Yeray (yellow card) 90+6'	Report	Ünal 3', (yellow card) 32'; Mitrović (yellow card) 25'; Cuenca (red card) 65'; Djené (yellow card) 86'; Jankto (red card) 90'; Mata (yellow card) 90+3'; Suárez (yellow card) 90+7'	Stadium: San Mamés; Attendance: 37,367; Referee: Jesús Gil Manzano

3 April 2022 30	Athletic Bilbao	2–1	Elche	Bilbao
14:00 CEST (UTC+2)	Berenguer 32'; Vesga (yellow card) 50'; Villalibre 86'; Núñez (yellow card) 90+5'	Report	Bigas (yellow card) 48'; Marcone (yellow card) 56'; Carrillo (yellow card) 61'; Josan (yellow card) 67', (goal) 90+2'	Stadium: San Mamés; Attendance: 34,572; Referee: Jorge Figueroa Vázquez

9 April 2022 31	Villarreal	1–1	Athletic Bilbao	Villarreal
18:30 CEST (UTC+2)	Pedraza (yellow card) 50', (goal) 60'; Mandi (yellow card) 81'	Report	R. García 43'; Petxarroman (yellow card) 85'; D. García (yellow card) 90'; Sancet (yellow card) 90+1'	Stadium: Estadio de la Cerámica; Attendance: 16,603; Referee: Carlos del Cerro Grande

17 April 2022 32	Athletic Bilbao	0–2	Celta Vigo	Bilbao
18:30 CEST (UTC+2)	Petxarroman (yellow card) 41'; Muniain (yellow card) 62'	Report	Aspas 11'; Beltrán 37'; Kevin (yellow card) 51'; Tapia (yellow card) 90+4'	Stadium: San Mamés; Attendance: 35,541; Referee: Alejandro Hernández Hernández

21 April 2022 33	Cádiz	2–3	Athletic Bilbao	Cádiz
20:00 CEST (UTC+2)	Lozano (yellow card) 9'; Chust (yellow card) 21'; Pérez 56'; Cala (yellow card) 63'; Sobrino 87'	Report	R. García 3'; Muniain (penalty missed) 22', 22'; Vesga 33', (yellow card) 63' (yellow-red card) 71'; Martínez (yellow card) 50'; Vivian (yellow card) 69'; Vencedor (yellow card) 90+6'	Stadium: Nuevo Mirandilla; Attendance: 17,360; Referee: Valentín Pizarro Gómez

30 April 2022 34	Athletic Bilbao	2–0	Atlético Madrid	Bilbao
21:00 CEST (UTC+2)	Hermoso 8' (o.g.); D. García (yellow card) 25'; I. Williams 56' (pen.), (yellow card) 68'; Berenguer (yellow card) 90+1'	Report	Hermoso (yellow card) 1'; Mandava (yellow card) 18'; Lodi (yellow card) 71'	Stadium: San Mamés; Attendance: 43,398; Referee: Antonio Mateu Lahoz

7 May 2022 35	Athletic Bilbao	0–0	Valencia	Bilbao
16:15 CEST (UTC+2)	Yeray (yellow card) 8'; I. Williams (yellow card) 77'; De Marcos (yellow card) 88'; Simón (yellow card) 90+9'	Report	Diakhaby (yellow card) 26'; Moriba (yellow card) 53'; Guillamón (yellow card) 72' (yellow-red card) 90+8'	Stadium: San Mamés; Attendance: 41,091; Referee: Isidro Díaz De Mera Escuderos

10 May 2022 36	Granada	1–0	Athletic Bilbao	Granada
20:00 CEST (UTC+2)	Collado 35'; Quini (yellow card) 41'; Escudero (yellow card) 77'; Duarte (yellow card) 88'; Eteki (yellow card) 90+2'	Report	Vesga (yellow card) 72' (yellow-red card) 85'	Stadium: Nuevo Los Cármenes; Attendance: 16,638; Referee: José María Sánchez Martínez

15 May 2022 37	Athletic Bilbao	2–0	Osasuna	Bilbao
19:30 CEST (UTC+2)	Berenguer 33'; Villalibre 79'	Report		Stadium: San Mamés; Attendance: 37,869; Referee: Jorge Figueroa Vázquez

22 May 2022 38	Sevilla	1–0	Athletic Bilbao	Seville
22:00 CEST (UTC+2)	Jordán (yellow card) 25'; Mir 68'; Acuña (yellow card) 77'; Gómez (yellow card) 90+5'	Report	R. García (yellow card) 38'; Berchiche (yellow card) 57'; Vivian (yellow card) 65'	Stadium: Ramón Sánchez Pizjuán; Attendance: 31,305; Referee: Carlos del Cerro Grande

=== Copa del Rey ===
6 January 2022 Round of 32	Atlético Mancha Real	0–2	Athletic Bilbao	Mancha Real
20:00 CET (UTC+1)		Report	N. Williams 20', 43'	Stadium: La Juventud; Referee: Juan Martínez Munuera

20 January 2022 Round of 16	Athletic Bilbao	3–2 (a.e.t.)	Barcelona	Bilbao
21:30 CET (UTC+1)	Muniain 2', 105+1' (pen.), (yellow card) 120'; D. García (yellow card) 30'; Martínez 86'; De Marcos (yellow card) 104'; I. Williams (yellow card) 119'	Report	Torres 20'; Piqué (yellow card) 76'; Pedri 90+3', (yellow card) 97'; F. de Jong (yellow card) 104'; Alba (yellow card) 105'	Stadium: San Mamés; Referee: José Luis Munuera Montero

3 February 2022 Quarter-finals	Athletic Bilbao	1–0	Real Madrid	Bilbao
21:30 CET (UTC+1)	D. García (yellow card) 42'; De Marcos (yellow card) 67'; Berchiche (yellow card) 68'; Berenguer 89'	Report	Kroos (yellow card) 24'; Modrić (yellow card) 59'	Stadium: San Mamés; Attendance: 38,750; Referee: Jesús Gil Manzano

10 February 2022 Semi-finals; First leg	Athletic Bilbao	1–1	Valencia	Bilbao
21:30 CET (UTC+1)	R. García 37'; D. García (yellow card) 63'	Report	Foulquier (yellow card) 43'; Gómez (red card) 45+3'; Duro 65', (yellow card) 90'; Diakhaby (yellow card) 79'	Stadium: San Mamés; Attendance: 42,906; Referee: José Luis Munuera Montero

2 March 2022 Semi-finals; Second leg	Valencia	1–0 (2–1 agg.)	Athletic Bilbao	Valencia
21:30 CET (UTC+1)	Gabriel (yellow card) 26'; Guedes 43'; Alderete (yellow card) 74'; Diakhaby (yellow card) 90+2'	Report	Martínez (yellow card) 60'; Zarraga (yellow card) 90+5'	Stadium: Mestalla; Attendance: 41,731; Referee: Jesús Gil Manzano

=== Supercopa de España ===
13 January 2022 Semi-finals	Atlético Madrid	1–2	Athletic Bilbao	Riyadh, Saudi Arabia
22:00 SAST (UTC+3)	Simón 62' (o.g.); Vrsaljko (yellow card) 90+1'; Giménez (red card) 90+4'	Report	Yeray 77'; N. Williams 81'; Martínez (yellow card) 83'; Vesga (yellow card) 90'; I. Williams (yellow card) 90+1'	Stadium: King Fahd International Stadium; Attendance: 7,000; Referee: Guillermo Cuadra Fernández

16 January 2022 Final	Athletic Bilbao	0–2	Real Madrid	Riyadh, Saudi Arabia
21:30 SAST (UTC+3)	D. García (yellow card) 77'; R. García (penalty missed) 89'; Yeray (yellow card) 90'	Report	Modrić 38'; Benzema 52' (pen.); Militão (red card) 87'	Stadium: King Fahd International Stadium; Attendance: 30,000; Referee: César Soto Grado

== Statistics ==
=== Appearances and goals ===
No.	Pos	Nat	Player	Total		La Liga		Copa del Rey		Supercopa de España	
No.	Pos	Nat	Player	Apps	Goals	Apps	Goals	Apps	Goals	Apps	Goals
Goalkeepers
1	GK	(Spain) ESP	Unai Simón	36	0	34	0	0	0	2	0
13	GK	(Spain) ESP	Jokin Ezkieta	0	0	0	0	0	0	0	0
26	GK	(Spain) ESP	Julen Agirrezabala	9	0	4	0	5	0	0	0
Defenders
2	DF	(Spain) ESP	Álex Petxarroman	19	0	1+16	0	1+1	0	0	0
3	DF	(Spain) ESP	Unai Núñez	9	0	7+2	0	0	0	0	0
4	DF	(Spain) ESP	Iñigo Martínez	34	4	26+1	3	5	1	2	0
5	DF	(Spain) ESP	Yeray Álvarez	27	1	21+1	0	3	0	2	1
12	DF	(Spain) ESP	Dani Vivian	27	2	22+2	2	2+1	0	0	0
15	DF	(Spain) ESP	Iñigo Lekue	29	0	22+3	0	3+1	0	0	0
17	DF	(Spain) ESP	Yuri Berchiche	20	1	11+3	1	4	0	0+2	0
18	DF	(Spain) ESP	Óscar de Marcos	26	1	19+3	1	2	0	2	0
21	DF	(Spain) ESP	Ander Capa	1	0	0+1	0	0	0	0	0
24	DF	(Spain) ESP	Mikel Balenziaga	31	0	23+3	0	0+3	0	2	0
Midfielders
6	MF	(Spain) ESP	Mikel Vesga	39	2	17+15	2	5	0	0+2	0
8	MF	(Spain) ESP	Oihan Sancet	33	6	16+11	6	1+3	0	2	0
14	MF	(Spain) ESP	Dani García	39	0	27+5	0	4+1	0	2	0
16	MF	(Spain) ESP	Unai Vencedor	35	0	29+5	0	0+1	0	0	0
19	MF	(Spain) ESP	Oier Zarraga	37	1	8+23	1	0+4	0	2	0
22	MF	(Spain) ESP	Raúl García	42	7	24+11	6	5	1	0+2	0
Forwards
7	FW	(Spain) ESP	Álex Berenguer	41	4	24+10	3	3+2	1	2	0
9	FW	(Spain) ESP	Iñaki Williams	44	8	32+6	8	3+1	0	2	0
10	FW	(Spain) ESP	Iker Muniain	41	6	34+1	4	4	2	2	0
20	FW	(Spain) ESP	Asier Villalibre	20	2	3+16	2	0+1	0	0	0
30	FW	(Spain) ESP	Nico Williams	40	3	11+23	0	3+1	2	0+2	1
33	FW	(Spain) ESP	Nico Serrano	17	1	3+11	1	1+1	0	0+1	0
34	FW	(Spain) ESP	Juan Artola	1	0	0	0	0+1	0	0	0
Players who have made an appearance this season but have left the club
11	FW	(Spain) ESP	Jon Morcillo	7	0	0+7	0	0	0	0	0
23	DF	(Spain) ESP	Peru Nolaskoain	3	0	0+1	0	1+1	0	0	0
