= 2021–22 Real Madrid CF season =

118th season in existence of Real Madrid CF

Real Madrid
2021–22 season
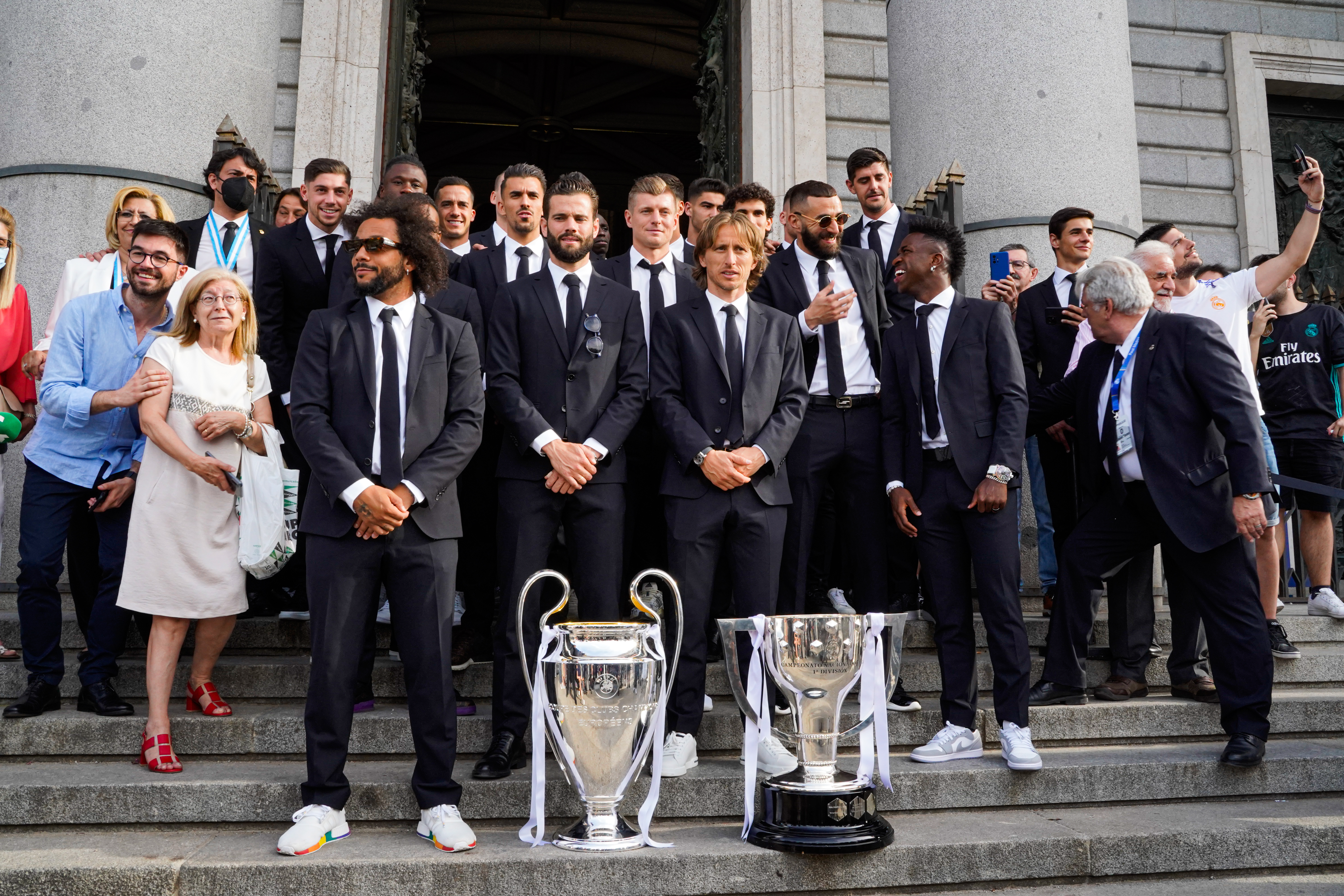
- Real Madrid players celebrating the double on 29 May 2022, the day after their Champions League victory
- President: Florentino Pérez
- Head coach: Carlo Ancelotti
- Stadium: Santiago Bernabéu
- La Liga: 1st
- Copa del Rey: Quarter-finals
- Supercopa de España: Winners
- UEFA Champions League: Winners
- Top goalscorer: League: Karim Benzema (27); All: Karim Benzema (44)
- Highest home attendance: 61,416 vs Manchester City
- Lowest home attendance: 19,874 vs Celta Vigo
- Average home league attendance: 41,231 (Note: Due to the COVID-19 pandemic, attendance was capped at 40% in August and 60% in September; since October, full capacity was allowed. Additionally, Santiago Bernabéu's capacity was limited throughout the season due to renovation works.)
- Biggest win: Real Madrid 6–0 Levante
- Biggest defeat: Real Madrid 0–4 Barcelona
Home colours	Away colours	Third colours

The 2021–22 Real Madrid Club de Fútbol season was the 118th season in existence and the club's 91st consecutive season in the top flight of Spanish football. In addition to the domestic league, Real Madrid participated in this season's editions of the Copa del Rey, the Supercopa de España, and the UEFA Champions League.

This season saw Carlo Ancelotti return to the club, having led it to La Décima in his first spell. On the domestic front, he delivered two trophies out of possible three, winning La Liga and the Supercopa de España. With that, Ancelotti became the first manager in Real Madrid history to have won all of the six available top-tier major trophies. In the Champions League, Madrid produced one of the most memorable runs of all time, defeating pre-tournament favorites Paris Saint-Germain, defending champions and favorites Chelsea, Premier League champions and heavy favorites Manchester City, all in dramatic fashion, and setting up the final against Liverpool, who were once again widely considered as favorites, in a rematch of their 2018 encounter. A lone Vinícius goal in the second half sealed the 14th European Cup for Los Blancos, their fifth in nine years. This was also Carlo Ancelotti's fourth Champions League title as coach, making him the most successful manager in the competition's history. Real also claimed their fourth ever European double (after 1956–57, 1957–58, and 2016–17).

This was the first ever season since 2004–05 without former captain Sergio Ramos, who departed for Paris Saint-Germain in the summer and first time since 2010–11 without the Frenchman Raphaël Varane who departed to Manchester United, with both having been Madrid's first choice centre-back pairing for years, therefore leaving in the same transfer window.

== Summary ==
=== Pre-season ===
On 27 May, after the conclusion of the 2020–21 season, Zinedine Zidane announced that he would leave Real Madrid. The next day, Real Madrid announced the signing of David Alaba on a free transfer from Bayern Munich. Alaba signed on a five-year contract. Carlo Ancelotti returned as the head coach on 1 June, having already led Madrid in 2013–15. On 16 June, the club announced that Sergio Ramos would leave after 16 years of service and winning 22 trophies.

=== August ===
The first match of the season was won 4–1 against Alavés on 14 August. Karim Benzema scored a brace, with the other goals coming from Nacho and Vinícius Júnior. Raphaël Varane left Madrid on the same day, to join Manchester United. On 20 August, Martin Ødegaard left the club to join Arsenal. Two goals from Vinícius and a goal from Gareth Bale saved Madrid a point in a 3–3 draw with Levante on 22 August. Six days later, a goal from Dani Carvajal secured three points for Madrid in a 1–0 win over Real Betis. On 31 August, Eduardo Camavinga joined the club on a transfer from Rennes.

=== September ===
A hat-trick from Benzema, a strike from Vinícius and a debut goal from Camavinga gave Madrid a 5–2 win over Celta Vigo on 12 September, their first game at the Santiago Bernabéu Stadium in 560 days following extensive renovations. Three days later, a late goal from Rodrygo got Madrid off to a winning start in the UEFA Champions League, with a 1–0 win over Inter Milan. On 19 September, two late goals from Benzema and Vinícius gave Madrid a 2–1 win over Valencia. Three days later, Mallorca was defeated 6–1, with a hat-trick from Marco Asensio, a brace from Benzema, and a goal from Isco. A home match against Villarreal on 25 September ended in a 0–0 draw, which was Madrid's first official game of the season without scoring a goal. On 28 September, Madrid suffered a 1–2 upset home loss to Sheriff Tiraspol in the Champions League, where Benzema converted a penalty to score the momentary equalizer.

=== October ===
The next game on 3 October ended in another loss, a 1–2 defeat to Espanyol in which Benzema scored the lone goal for Madrid. On 19 October, Madrid defeated Shakhtar Donetsk 5–0 away from home on Matchday 3 of the Champions League. Vinícius scored a brace and the other goals came from Benzema and Rodrygo, alongside an own goal. Five days later, the first El Clásico of the season against Barcelona at Camp Nou was won 2–1 after goals from David Alaba, a debut one for the Austrian, and Lucas Vázquez. The home game against Osasuna on 27 October ended in a goalless draw. Elche were defeated three days later on the road with a score of 2–1 thanks to a Vinícius brace.

=== November ===
On 3 November, Madrid defeated Shakhtar 2–1 at home after a brace from Benzema. The first goal was Madrid's 1000th in their Champions League history. Three days later, Rayo Vallecano were defeated 2–1 at home after goals from Toni Kroos and Benzema. On 21 November, Madrid defeated Granada 4–1 away from home. The goals came from Asensio, Nacho, Vinícius and Ferland Mendy. Three days later, Sheriff was defeated 3–0 on the road in the Champions League with Alaba, Kroos and Benzema scoring the goals. With that win, Madrid secured their place in the knockout stages for the 25th time in a row. On 28 November, Sevilla were defeated 2–1 at the Bernabéu with goals from Benzema and Vinícius.

=== December ===
On the first day of the new month, a Benzema goal secured Madrid a 1–0 home victory over Athletic Bilbao. Three days later, another Basque team, Real Sociedad, was beaten 2–0 at Anoeta with goals from Vinícius and Luka Jović. Goals from Kroos and Asensio on 7 December secured Madrid a first-place finish in their Champions League group with a 2–0 home win over Inter. On 12 December, Benzema and Asensio scored for a 2–0 Madrid Derby win against Atlético Madrid at the Bernabéu. The home game against Cádiz on 19 December ended in a goalless draw. Bilbao were defeated 2–1 away from home on the last matchday of 2021, with Benzema scoring a brace.

=== January ===
On the second day of the new year, Madrid lost 0–1 away to Getafe, suffering the first defeat since 3 October, a loss at Espanyol. The round of 32 of the Copa del Rey was a rematch against Alcoyano on 5 January, who eliminated Madrid at the same stage last year. This time Madrid won 3–1, with goals from Militão, Asensio and an own goal. Three days later, Madrid defeated Valencia 4–1 at home after braces from Vinícius and Benzema, with the latter scoring his 300th goal for the club. On 12 January, the first semi-final of the 2022 Supercopa de España was won 3–2 after extra time against Barcelona. Vinícius, Benzema and Federico Valverde scored the goals. The following day, Madrid terminated the loan agreement with Roma for Borja Mayoral and sent him to Getafe until 30 June 2022. On 16 January, Madrid won their first trophy of the season, the Supercopa de España, defeating Athletic Bilbao 2–0 in the final with goals from Luka Modrić and Benzema. Four days later, Madrid faced Elche away from home in the Copa del Rey round of 16 and won 2–1 with a late extra time comeback after goals from Isco and Eden Hazard. On 23 January, Madrid played another match against Elche, this time in the league at the Bernabéu, and made another last minute comeback. The final score was 2–2, with Modrić and Militão scoring the goals.

=== February ===
On 3 February, Real Madrid faced Athletic Bilbao at the San Mamés in the Copa del Rey quarter-finals in the first game of the month, making it the fourth meeting between the two teams in two months. Madrid lost 0–1 and were eliminated, meaning they had progressed past the quarter-final stage only once after their victory in 2014. Three days later, Madrid hosted Granada in a league match and won 1–0, with the only goal coming from Asensio. On 12 February, Madrid played against Villarreal away from home, with the game ending in a goalless stalemate. On 15 February, Real met Paris Saint-Germain at the Parc des Princes in the first leg of the Champions League round of 16. A lone Mbappe goal at the death gave Paris the advantage. Four days later, Madrid defeated Alaves 3–0 at home, with Asensio, Vinícius and Benzema scoring the goals. On 26 February, Madrid faced Rayo Vallecano on the road and clinched the three points with a late goal from Benzema.

=== March ===
On 5 March, goals from Camavinga, Modrić, Benzema and Asensio helped Madrid to take a smashing 4–1 victory over Real Sociedad in the first game of the month, a day before the club's 120th birthday. Four days later, Madrid faced Paris Saint-Germain at the Bernabéu in the second leg of the Champions League round of 16. A hat-trick from Benzema powered Real's late comeback, with the team winning 3–1 (3–2 on aggregate) and progressing to the quarter-finals. On 14 March, Madrid defeated Mallorca away from home, with Benzema scoring twice and Vinícius also on the scoresheet. On 20 March, Madrid hosted the third El Clásico of the season and lost 0–4. This was Real's first Clásico loss since 0–1 in March 2019 and their biggest since 1–5 in October 2018.

=== April ===
On 2 April, after the international break, Madrid beat Celta Vigo 2–1 away from home, with Benzema scoring two goals from the penalty spot. Four days later, Madrid met Chelsea away from home in the Champions League quarter-finals first leg, rematching the last season's semi-finals. Madrid won 3–1 thanks to the second Benzema Champions League knockout hat-trick in a row, making him the first player to achieve that feat since Cristiano Ronaldo in the 2016–17 edition. On 9 April, goals from Casemiro and Vázquez gave Madrid a 2–0 home win over Getafe. Three days later, Madrid faced Chelsea at home in the second leg of the Champions League quarter-finals. Real suffered a 2–3 loss after extra time, but managed to win 5–4 on aggregate to reach the semi-finals with a late Rodrygo goal and an extra time header from Benzema. On 17 April, goals from Rodrygo and Nacho and a late winner from Benzema helped Madrid produce a comeback and beat Sevilla 3–2 away from home to secure their third consecutive win at the Ramon Sánchez Pizjuan, which has not happened in over 30 years, and move closer to the title. Three days later, Madrid got a 3–1 away win over Osasuna after goals from Alaba, Asensio and Vázquez. On 26 April, Madrid played the first leg of the Champions League semi-finals against Manchester City on the away soil. The match ended in a 3–4 loss, with a Benzema brace and a goal from Vinícius. On 30 April, Real Madrid sealed their 35th La Liga title with a 4–0 win over Espanyol at the Bernabéu after a brace from Rodrygo and goals from Asensio and Benzema. With four games to spare, this was Real's earliest league title since 1990.

=== May ===
In the first match of the month, on 4 May, Madrid faced Manchester City in the second leg of the Champions League semi-finals. Real produced another late comeback, with a brace from Rodrygo moving the game to extra time where a Benzema penalty sealed the victory, qualifying Madrid for the final, 17th overall for them and first since 2018, and defeating their opponents 3–1 in the match and 6–5 on aggregate. Real Madrid became the first team to lose three knockout games en route to the Champions League final since the current format was introduced in the 2003–04 season. This was also the first time in the club's history that Real qualified for the Champions League final after losing the first leg of the semi-finals, having failed to do so on eight previous occasions. Four days later, Madrid lost 0–1 versus Atlético away from home. This was Real's first ever derby loss at the Wanda Metropolitano and also the first since the 2018 UEFA Super Cup. On 12 May, Madrid demolished Levante in a 6–0 home win, with a hat-trick from Vinícius, the first in his career, and goals from Mendy, Rodrygo and Benzema, who equalled his Real Madrid goalscoring record with Raúl's. Three days later, Madrid drew Cádiz 1–1 away from home with a goal from Mariano. On 20 May, in the season's last league game, Madrid faced Real Betis at the Bernabéu, with the match ending in a 0–0 draw. For the first time since the 1983–84 season, no one in the team was sent off during their La Liga campaign.

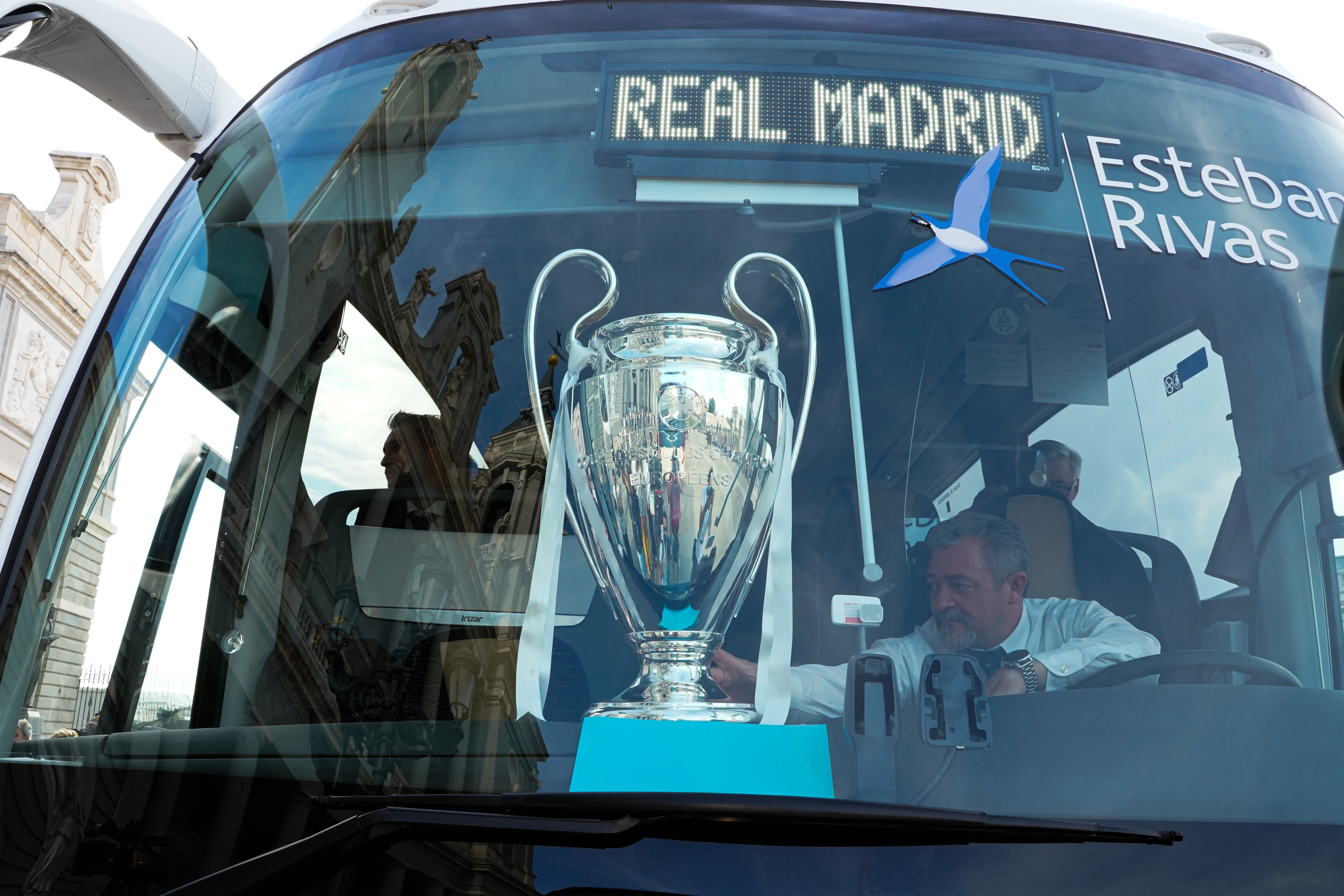
The European Champion Clubs' Cup during the trophy parade

On 28 May, Madrid faced Liverpool in the Champions League final in a rematch of their 2018 encounter. A lone Vinícius goal sealed the 14th European Cup for Los Blancos, their fifth in nine years, and Ancelotti's second in charge, making him the first manager to win four Champions League trophies (with Milan in 2003 and 2007, and with Madrid in 2014 and 2022). Despite Real Madrid's status as the most decorated team in European Cup / Champions League history, they were considered underdogs in this season's campaign, rated no higher than seventh prior to the start of the group stages in September 2021 (after, in order, Paris Saint-Germain, Manchester City, Bayern Munich, Chelsea, Liverpool, and Manchester United). Prior to the start of the knockout phase in February 2022, they were again seventh, behind Manchester City, Bayern Munich, Liverpool, Chelsea, Paris Saint-Germain, and Ajax, in addition to having been considered underdogs to all of the teams they faced thereafter. As such, Madrid's run can be considered among the most improbable ones in modern Champions League history.

== Players ==
N	Pos.	Nat.	Name	Age	EU	Since	App	Goals	Ends	Transfer fee	Notes
1	GK	(Belgium)	Thibaut Courtois	30	EU	2018	181	0	2026	€35M	
2	DF	(Spain)	Dani Carvajal	30	EU	2013	330	7	2025	€6.5M	Originally from youth system
3	DF	(Brazil)	Éder Militão	24	Non-EU	2019	91	4	2025	€50M	
4	DF	(Austria)	David Alaba	30	EU	2021	46	3	2026	Free	
5	DF	(Spain)	Jesús Vallejo	25	EU	2015	27	1	2025	€6M	
6	DF	(Spain)	Nacho (2nd VC)	32	EU	2010	275	15	2023	Youth system	
7	FW	(Belgium)	Eden Hazard	31	EU	2019	66	6	2024	€135M	
8	MF	(Germany)	Toni Kroos	32	EU	2014	365	25	2023	€25M	
9	FW	(France)	Karim Benzema (VC)	34	EU	2009	605	323	2023	€35M	
10	MF	(Croatia)	Luka Modrić (3rd VC)	36	EU	2012	435	31	2022	€30M	
11	FW	(Spain)	Marco Asensio	26	EU	2014	235	48	2023	€4M	
12	DF	(Brazil)	Marcelo (captain)	34	EU	2007 (Winter)	546	38	2022	€6.5M	Second nationality: Spain
13	GK	(Ukraine)	Andriy Lunin	23	EU	2018	5	0	2024	€8.5M	Not strictly from a EU country
14	MF	(Brazil)	Casemiro	30	EU	2013	334	31	2025	€6M	Second nationality: Spain
15	MF	(Uruguay)	Federico Valverde	23	EU	2016	147	6	2027	€5M	Second nationality: Spain
16	FW	(Serbia)	Luka Jović	24	EU	2019	51	3	2025	€60M	Not strictly from a EU country
17	FW	(Spain)	Lucas Vázquez	30	EU	2015	281	28	2024	€1M	Originally from youth system
18	FW	(Wales)	Gareth Bale	32	EU	2013	258	106	2022	€100M	
19	MF	(Spain)	Dani Ceballos	25	EU	2017	74	5	2023	€18M	
20	FW	(Brazil)	Vinícius Júnior	21	Non-EU	2018	170	37	2025	€45M	
21	FW	(Brazil)	Rodrygo	21	Non-EU	2019	108	18	2025	€45M	
22	MF	(Spain)	Isco	30	EU	2013	353	54	2022	€25M	
23	DF	(France)	Ferland Mendy	27	EU	2019	105	5	2025	€48M	
24	FW	(Dominican Republic)	Mariano	28	EU	2018	73	12	2023	€23M	Originally from youth system
25	MF	(France)	Eduardo Camavinga	19	EU	2021	40	2	2027	€30M	

- Source: realmadrid.com
- Ordered by squad number.

== Transfers ==
=== In ===
Date	Pos.	Name	From	Type	Ref.
1 July 2021	DF	(Austria) David Alaba	(Germany) Bayern Munich	Free transfer	
1 July 2021	DF	(Spain) Jesús Vallejo	Granada	End of loan	
1 July 2021	MF	(Spain) Dani Ceballos	(England) Arsenal	End of loan	
1 July 2021	MF	(Spain) Brahim Díaz	(Italy) Milan	End of loan	
1 July 2021	MF	(Japan) Takefusa Kubo	Getafe	End of loan	
1 July 2021	MF	(Norway) Martin Ødegaard	(England) Arsenal	End of loan	
1 July 2021	FW	(Wales) Gareth Bale	(England) Tottenham Hotspur	End of loan	
1 July 2021	FW	(Serbia) Luka Jović	(Germany) Eintracht Frankfurt	End of loan	
31 August 2021	MF	(France) Eduardo Camavinga	(France) Rennes	Transfer	
13 January 2022	FW	(Spain) Borja Mayoral	(Italy) Roma	Loan termination	

=== Out ===
Date	Pos.	Name	To	Type	Ref.
1 July 2021	DF	(Spain) Sergio Ramos	(France) Paris Saint-Germain	End of contract	
19 July 2021	MF	(Spain) Brahim Díaz	(Italy) Milan	Loan	
11 August 2021	MF	(Japan) Takefusa Kubo	Mallorca	Loan	
14 August 2021	DF	(France) Raphaël Varane	(England) Manchester United	Transfer	
20 August 2021	MF	(Norway) Martin Ødegaard	(England) Arsenal	Transfer	
28 August 2021	DF	(Spain) Álvaro Odriozola	(Italy) Fiorentina	Loan	
13 January 2022	FW	(Spain) Borja Mayoral	Getafe	Loan	

=== Contract renewals ===
Date	Pos.	Name	Contract length	Contract ends	Ref.
8 July 2021	DF	(Spain) Nacho	1-year	2023	
29 July 2021	DF	(Spain) Dani Carvajal	3-year	2025	
16 August 2021	GK	(Belgium) Thibaut Courtois	2-year	2026	
20 August 2021	FW	(France) Karim Benzema	1-year	2023	
24 August 2021	MF	(Uruguay) Federico Valverde	2-year	2027	
27 August 2021	MF	(Brazil) Casemiro	2-year	2025	
8 June 2022	MF	(Croatia) Luka Modrić	1-year	2023	

== Pre-season and friendlies ==
11 July 2021 1	Real Madrid	3–1	Fuenlabrada	Madrid
18:00 CEST (UTC+2)	Chust; Ødegaard; Mariano	Report		Stadium: Alfredo Di Stéfano; Attendance: 0
Note: The match was played behind closed doors.

18 July 2021 2	Real Madrid	1–1	Rayo Vallecano	Madrid
20:00 CEST (UTC+2)	Isco (pen.)	Report	Chust (o.g.)	Stadium: Alfredo Di Stéfano; Attendance: 0
Note: The match was played behind closed doors.

25 July 2021 3	Rangers	2–1	Real Madrid	Glasgow, Scotland
19:00 CEST (UTC+2)	Sakala 55'; Itten 77'	Report	Rodrygo 8'; Nacho (yellow card) 42' (yellow-red card) 75'	Stadium: Ibrox; Attendance: 12,750; Referee: Willie Collum (Scotland)

8 August 2021 4	Real Madrid	0–0	AC Milan	Klagenfurt, Austria
18:30 CEST (UTC+2)		Report		Stadium: Wörthersee Stadion; Referee: Walter Altmann (Austria)

== Competitions ==
=== Overview ===
Competition	First match	Last match	Starting round	Final position	Record							
Competition	First match	Last match	Starting round	Final position	Pld	W	D	L	GF	GA	GD	Win %
La Liga	13 August 2021	22 May 2022	Matchday 1	Winners	38	26	8	4	80	31	+49	68.42
Copa del Rey	5 January 2022	3 February 2022	Round of 32	Quarter-finals	3	2	0	1	5	3	+2	66.67
Supercopa de España	12 January 2022	16 January 2022	Semi-finals	Winners	2	2	0	0	5	2	+3	100.00
Champions League	15 September 2021	28 May 2022	Group stage	Winners	13	9	0	4	29	14	+15	69.23
Total					56	39	8	9	119	50	+69	69.64

Source: Soccerway

=== La Liga ===
==== League table ====
Pos	Team	Pld	W	D	L	GF	GA	GD	Pts	Qualification or relegation
1	Real Madrid (C)	38	26	8	4	80	31	+49	86	Qualification for the Champions League group stage
2	Barcelona	38	21	10	7	68	38	+30	73	Qualification for the Champions League group stage
3	Atlético Madrid	38	21	8	9	65	43	+22	71	Qualification for the Champions League group stage
4	Sevilla	38	18	16	4	53	30	+23	70	Qualification for the Champions League group stage
5	Real Betis	38	19	8	11	62	40	+22	65	Qualification for the Europa League group stage (Note: Since the winners of the 2021–22 Copa del Rey, Real Betis, qualified for European competition based on league position, the Europa League berth awarded to the Copa del Rey winners was passed to the sixth-placed team, and the Europa Conference League berth awarded to the sixth-placed team was passed to the seventh-placed team.)

Source: LaLiga Santander
Rules for classification: 1) Points; 2) Head-to-head points; 3) Head-to-head goal difference; 4) Goal difference; 5) Goals scored; 6) Fair-play points (Note: Head-to-head record is used only after all the matches between the teams in question have been played)
(C) Champions

==== Results summary ====
Overall								Home						Away					
Pld	W	D	L	GF	GA	GD	Pts	W	D	L	GF	GA	GD	W	D	L	GF	GA	GD
38	26	8	4	80	31	+49	86	13	5	1	44	13	+31	13	3	3	36	18	+18

Source: La Liga

==== Results by round ====
Round	1	2	3	4	5	6	7	8	9	10	11	12	13	14	15	16	17	18	19	20	21	22	23	24	25	26	27	28	29	30	31	32	33	34	35	36	37	38
Ground	A	A	A	H	A	H	H	A	A	H	A	H	A	H	H	A	H	H	A	A	H	H	H	A	H	A	H	A	H	A	H	A	A	H	A	H	A	H
Result	W	D	W	W	W	W	D	L	W	D	W	W	W	W	W	W	W	D	W	L	W	D	W	D	W	W	W	W	L	W	W	W	W	W	L	W	D	D
Position	1	3	1	1	1	1	1	1	2	2	2	2	1	1	1	1	1	1	1	1	1	1	1	1	1	1	1	1	1	1	1	1	1	1	1	1	1	1

Source: La Liga
A = Away; H = Home; W = Win; D = Draw; L = Loss

==== Matches ====
The league fixtures were announced on 30 June 2021.

14 August 2021 1	Alavés	1–4	Real Madrid	Vitoria-Gasteiz
22:00 CEST (UTC+2)	Joselu 65' (pen.)	Report	Benzema 48', 62'; Nacho 56'; Vinícius 90+2'	Stadium: Mendizorrotza; Attendance: 3,968; Referee: César Soto Grado

22 August 2021 2	Levante	3–3	Real Madrid	Valencia
22:00 CEST (UTC+2)	Roger 46'; Campaña 57'; Róber 79'; Fernández (red card) 87'	Report	Bale 5'; Vinícius 73', 85'	Stadium: Ciutat de València; Attendance: 9,838; Referee: Guillermo Cuadra Fernández

28 August 2021 3	Real Betis	0–1	Real Madrid	Seville
22:00 CEST (UTC+2)		Report	Carvajal 61'	Stadium: Benito Villamarín; Attendance: 22,590; Referee: Alejandro Hernández Hernández

12 September 2021 4	Real Madrid	5–2	Celta Vigo	Madrid
21:00 CEST (UTC+2)	Benzema 24', 46', 87' (pen.); Vinícius 54'; Camavinga 72'	Report	Mina 4'; Cervi 31'	Stadium: Santiago Bernabéu; Attendance: 19,874; Referee: José María Sánchez Martínez

19 September 2021 5	Valencia	1–2	Real Madrid	Valencia
21:00 CEST (UTC+2)	Duro 66'	Report	Vinícius 86'; Benzema 88'	Stadium: Mestalla; Attendance: 26,689; Referee: Pablo González Fuertes

22 September 2021 6	Real Madrid	6–1	Mallorca	Madrid
22:00 CEST (UTC+2)	Benzema 3', 78'; Asensio 24', 29', 55'; Isco 84'	Report	Lee 25'	Stadium: Santiago Bernabéu; Attendance: 20,113; Referee: Javier Alberola Rojas

25 September 2021 7	Real Madrid	0–0	Villarreal	Madrid
21:00 CEST (UTC+2)		Report		Stadium: Santiago Bernabéu; Attendance: 23,985; Referee: Jesús Gil Manzano

3 October 2021 8	Espanyol	2–1	Real Madrid	Cornellà de Llobregat
16:15 CEST (UTC+2)	De Tomás 17'; Vidal 60'	Report	Benzema 71'	Stadium: RCDE Stadium; Attendance: 23,377; Referee: Guillermo Cuadra Fernández

24 October 2021 9	Barcelona	1–2	Real Madrid	Barcelona
16:15 CEST (UTC+2)	Agüero 90+7'	Report	Alaba 32'; Vázquez 90+4'	Stadium: Camp Nou; Attendance: 86,422; Referee: José María Sánchez Martínez

27 October 2021 10	Real Madrid	0–0	Osasuna	Madrid
21:30 CEST (UTC+2)		Report		Stadium: Santiago Bernabéu; Attendance: 35,619; Referee: César Soto Grado

30 October 2021 11	Elche	1–2	Real Madrid	Elche
14:00 CEST (UTC+2)	Guti (yellow card) 8' (yellow-red card) 63'; Milla 86'	Report	Vinícius 22', 73'	Stadium: Martínez Valero; Attendance: 23,010; Referee: Ricardo de Burgos Bengoetxea

6 November 2021 12	Real Madrid	2–1	Rayo Vallecano	Madrid
21:00 CET (UTC+1)	Kroos 14'; Benzema 38'	Report	Falcao 76'	Stadium: Santiago Bernabéu; Attendance: 43,283; Referee: Pablo González Fuertes

21 November 2021 13	Granada	1–4	Real Madrid	Granada
16:15 CET (UTC+1)	Suárez 34'; Monchu (red card) 67'	Report	Asensio 19'; Nacho 25'; Vinícius 56'; Mendy 76'	Stadium: Nuevo Los Cármenes; Attendance: 17,460; Referee: Juan Martínez Munuera

28 November 2021 14	Real Madrid	2–1	Sevilla	Madrid
21:00 CET (UTC+1)	Benzema 32'; Vinícius 87'	Report	Mir 12'	Stadium: Santiago Bernabéu; Attendance: 45,281; Referee: José María Sánchez Martínez

1 December 2021 15	Real Madrid	1–0	Athletic Bilbao	Madrid
21:00 CEST (UTC+2)	Benzema 40'	Report		Stadium: Santiago Bernabéu; Attendance: 33,627; Referee: Isidro Díaz de Mera Escuderos
Note: The match, originally scheduled for 17 October 2021, was moved back due to the 2022 FIFA World Cup qualification in South America. The international break this season was longer than usual due the impact of postponements related to the COVID-19 pandemic.

4 December 2021 16	Real Sociedad	0–2	Real Madrid	San Sebastián
21:00 CET (UTC+1)		Report	Vinícius 47'; Jović 57'	Stadium: Reale Arena; Attendance: 35,765; Referee: Jesús Gil Manzano

12 December 2021 17	Real Madrid	2–0	Atlético Madrid	Madrid
21:00 CET (UTC+1)	Benzema 16'; Asensio 57'	Report		Stadium: Santiago Bernabéu; Attendance: 51,024; Referee: Antonio Mateu Lahoz

19 December 2021 18	Real Madrid	0–0	Cádiz	Madrid
21:00 CET (UTC+1)		Report		Stadium: Santiago Bernabéu; Attendance: 38,818; Referee: Santiago Jaime Latre

22 December 2021 19	Athletic Bilbao	1–2	Real Madrid	Bilbao
21:30 CET (UTC+1)	Sancet 10'	Report	Benzema 4', 7'	Stadium: San Mamés; Attendance: 42,722; Referee: César Soto Grado
Note: The match, originally scheduled for January 2022, was moved ahead due to both teams' participation in the 2022 Supercopa de España.

2 January 2022 20	Getafe	1–0	Real Madrid	Getafe
14:00 CET (UTC+1)	Ünal 9'	Report		Stadium: Coliseum Alfonso Pérez; Attendance: 11,890; Referee: Mario Melero López

8 January 2022 21	Real Madrid	4–1	Valencia	Madrid
21:00 CET (UTC+1)	Benzema 43' (pen.), 88'; Vinícius 52', 61'	Report	Guedes 76'	Stadium: Santiago Bernabéu; Attendance: 40,617; Referee: Alejandro Hernández Hernández

23 January 2022 22	Real Madrid	2–2	Elche	Madrid
16:15 CET (UTC+1)	Modrić 82' (pen.); Militão 90+2'	Report	Boyé 42'; Milla 76'	Stadium: Santiago Bernabéu; Attendance: 39,796; Referee: Ricardo de Burgos Bengoetxea

6 February 2022 23	Real Madrid	1–0	Granada	Madrid
21:00 CET (UTC+1)	Asensio 74'	Report		Stadium: Santiago Bernabéu; Attendance: 36,665; Referee: Antonio Mateu Lahoz

12 February 2022 24	Villarreal	0–0	Real Madrid	Villarreal
16:15 CET (UTC+1)		Report		Stadium: Estadio de la Cerámica; Attendance: 17,894; Referee: José María Sánchez Martínez

19 February 2022 25	Real Madrid	3–0	Alavés	Madrid
21:00 CET (UTC+1)	Asensio 63'; Vinícius 80'; Benzema 90+1' (pen.)	Report		Stadium: Santiago Bernabéu; Attendance: 42,180; Referee: José Luis Munuera Montero

26 February 2022 26	Rayo Vallecano	0–1	Real Madrid	Madrid
18:30 CET (UTC+1)		Report	Benzema 83'	Stadium: Vallecas; Attendance: 9,952; Referee: Isidro Díaz de Mera Escuderos

5 March 2022 27	Real Madrid	4–1	Real Sociedad	Madrid
21:00 CET (UTC+1)	Camavinga 40'; Modrić 43'; Benzema 76' (pen.); Asensio 79'	Report	Oyarzabal 10' (pen.)	Stadium: Santiago Bernabéu; Attendance: 52,410; Referee: Jesús Gil Manzano

14 March 2022 28	Mallorca	0–3	Real Madrid	Palma
21:00 CET (UTC+1)		Report	Vinícius 55'; Benzema 77' (pen.), 82'	Stadium: Visit Mallorca Estadi; Attendance: 17,191; Referee: José María Sánchez Martínez

20 March 2022 29	Real Madrid	0–4	Barcelona	Madrid
21:00 CET (UTC+1)		Report	Aubameyang 29', 51'; Araújo 38'; Torres 47'	Stadium: Santiago Bernabéu; Attendance: 60,017; Referee: Juan Martínez Munuera

2 April 2022 30	Celta Vigo	1–2	Real Madrid	Vigo
18:30 CEST (UTC+2)	Nolito 52'	Report	Benzema 19' (pen.), 69' (pen.)	Stadium: Abanca-Balaídos; Attendance: 15,714; Referee: Pablo González Fuertes

9 April 2022 31	Real Madrid	2–0	Getafe	Madrid
21:00 CEST (UTC+2)	Casemiro 38'; Vázquez 68'	Report		Stadium: Santiago Bernabéu; Attendance: 50,740; Referee: César Soto Grado

17 April 2022 32	Sevilla	2–3	Real Madrid	Seville
21:00 CEST (UTC+2)	Rakitić 21'; Lamela 25'	Report	Rodrygo 50'; Nacho 82'; Benzema 90+2'	Stadium: Ramón Sánchez Pizjuán; Attendance: 40,629; Referee: Guillermo Cuadra Fernández

20 April 2022 33	Osasuna	1–3	Real Madrid	Pamplona
21:30 CEST (UTC+2)	Budimir 13'	Report	Alaba 12'; Asensio 45'; Vázquez 90+6'	Stadium: El Sadar; Attendance: 21,360; Referee: Ricardo de Burgos Bengoetxea

30 April 2022 34	Real Madrid	4–0	Espanyol	Madrid
16:15 CEST (UTC+2)	Rodrygo 33', 43'; Asensio 55'; Benzema 81'	Report		Stadium: Santiago Bernabéu; Attendance: 58,686; Referee: José Luis Munuera Montero

8 May 2022 35	Atlético Madrid	1–0	Real Madrid	Madrid
21:00 CEST (UTC+2)	Carrasco 40' (pen.)	Report		Stadium: Wanda Metropolitano; Attendance: 63,874; Referee: César Soto Grado

12 May 2022 36	Real Madrid	6–0	Levante	Madrid
21:30 CEST (UTC+2)	Mendy 13'; Benzema 19'; Rodrygo 34'; Vinícius 45', 68', 83'	Report		Stadium: Santiago Bernabéu; Attendance: 38,421; Referee: Adrián Cordero Vega

15 May 2022 37	Cádiz	1–1	Real Madrid	Cádiz
19:30 CEST (UTC+2)	Sobrino 37'	Report	Mariano 5'	Stadium: Nuevo Mirandilla; Attendance: 19,643; Referee: Antonio Mateu Lahoz

20 May 2022 38	Real Madrid	0–0	Real Betis	Madrid
21:00 CEST (UTC+2)		Report		Stadium: Santiago Bernabéu; Attendance: 52,232; Referee: Santiago Jaime Latre

==== Score overview ====
Win Draw Loss

Opposition	Home score	Away score	Double
Alavés	3–0	4–1	7–1
Athletic Bilbao	1–0	2–1	3–1
Atlético Madrid	2–0	0–1	2–1
Barcelona	0–4	2–1	2–5
Cádiz	0–0	1–1	1–1
Celta Vigo	5–2	2–1	7–3
Elche	2–2	2–1	4–3
Espanyol	4–0	1–2	5–2
Getafe	2–0	0–1	2–1
Granada	1–0	4–1	5–1
Levante	6–0	3–3	9–3
Mallorca	6–1	3–0	9–1
Osasuna	0–0	3–1	3–1
Rayo Vallecano	2–1	1–0	3–1
Real Betis	0–0	1–0	1–0
Real Sociedad	4–1	2–0	6–1
Sevilla	2–1	3–2	5–3
Valencia	4–1	2–1	6–2
Villarreal	0–0	0–0	0–0

=== Copa del Rey ===
Madrid entered the tournament in the round of 32, as they had qualified for the 2022 Supercopa de España.

5 January 2022 Round of 32	Alcoyano	1–3	Real Madrid	Alcoy
21:30 CET (UTC+1)	Vega 66'	Report	Militão 39'; Asensio 76'; José Juan 78' (o.g.)	Stadium: El Collao; Attendance: 4,850; Referee: Adrián Cordero Vega

20 January 2022 Round of 16	Elche	1–2 (a.e.t.)	Real Madrid	Elche
19:00 CET (UTC+1)	Verdú 103'; Milla (yellow card) 87' (yellow-red card) 120+2'	Report	Marcelo (red card) 102'; Isco 108'; Hazard 115'	Stadium: Martínez Valero; Attendance: 33,732; Referee: Jorge Figueroa Vázquez

3 February 2022 Quarter-finals	Athletic Bilbao	1–0	Real Madrid	Bilbao
21:30 CET (UTC+1)	Berenguer 89'	Report		Stadium: San Mamés; Attendance: 38,750; Referee: Jesús Gil Manzano

=== Supercopa de España ===
12 January 2022 Semi-finals	Barcelona	2–3 (a.e.t.)	Real Madrid	Riyadh, Saudi Arabia
20:00 CET (UTC+1)	L. de Jong 41'; Fati 83'	Report	Vinícius 25'; Benzema 72'; Valverde 98'	Stadium: King Fahd International Stadium; Attendance: 35,000; Referee: José Luis Munuera Montero

16 January 2022 Final	Athletic Bilbao	0–2	Real Madrid	Riyadh, Saudi Arabia
19:30 CET (UTC+1)		Report	Modrić 38'; Benzema 52' (pen.); Militão (red card) 87'	Stadium: King Fahd International Stadium; Attendance: 30,000; Referee: César Soto Grado

=== UEFA Champions League ===
==== Group stage ====
The group stage draw was held on 26 August 2021.

Pos	Team	Pld	W	D	L	GF	GA	GD	Pts	Qualification	RMA	INT	SHE	SHK
1	(Spain) Real Madrid	6	5	0	1	14	3	+11	15	Advance to knockout phase	—	2–0	1–2	2–1
2	(Italy) Inter Milan	6	3	1	2	8	5	+3	10	Advance to knockout phase	0–1	—	3–1	2–0
3	(Moldova) Sheriff Tiraspol	6	2	1	3	7	11	−4	7	Transfer to Europa League	0–3	1–3	—	2–0
4	(Ukraine) Shakhtar Donetsk	6	0	2	4	2	12	−10	2		0–5	0–0	1–1	—

Source: UEFA
Rules for classification: Group stage tiebreakers

15 September 2021 1	Inter Milan (Italy)	0–1	(Spain) Real Madrid	Milan, Italy
21:00 CEST (UTC+2)		Report	Rodrygo 89'	Stadium: San Siro; Attendance: 37,082; Referee: Daniel Siebert (Germany)

28 September 2021 2	Real Madrid (Spain)	1–2	(Moldova) Sheriff Tiraspol	Madrid, Spain
21:00 CEST (UTC+2)	Benzema 65' (pen.)	Report	Yakhshiboev 25'; Thill 89'	Stadium: Santiago Bernabéu; Attendance: 24,522; Referee: Lawrence Visser (Belgium)

19 October 2021 3	Shakhtar Donetsk (Ukraine)	0–5	(Spain) Real Madrid	Kyiv, Ukraine (Note: Shakhtar Donetsk played their home matches at NSC Olimpiyskiy, Kyiv, instead of their regular stadium Donbas Arena, Donetsk, due to the war conditions in Eastern Ukraine.)
22:00 EEST (UTC+3)		Report	Kryvtsov 37' (o.g.); Vinícius 51', 56'; Rodrygo 65'; Benzema 90+1'	Stadium: NSC Olympiyskiy; Attendance: 34,037; Referee: Srđan Jovanović (Serbia)

3 November 2021 4	Real Madrid (Spain)	2–1	(Ukraine) Shakhtar Donetsk	Madrid, Spain
18:45 CET (UTC+1)	Benzema 14', 61'	Report	Fernando 39'	Stadium: Santiago Bernabéu; Attendance: 38,105; Referee: Benoît Bastien (France)

24 November 2021 5	Sheriff Tiraspol (Moldova)	0–3	(Spain) Real Madrid	Tiraspol, Moldova
22:00 EET (UTC+2)		Report	Alaba 30'; Kroos 45+1'; Benzema 55'	Stadium: Sheriff Stadium; Attendance: 5,932; Referee: Szymon Marciniak (Poland)

7 December 2021 6	Real Madrid (Spain)	2–0	(Italy) Inter Milan	Madrid, Spain
21:00 CET (UTC+1)	Kroos 17'; Asensio 79'	Report	Barella (red card) 64'	Stadium: Santiago Bernabéu; Attendance: 46,887; Referee: Felix Brych (Germany)

==== Knockout phase ====
===== Round of 16 =====
The draw for the round of 16 was held on 13 December 2021.

15 February 2022 First leg	Paris Saint-Germain (France)	1–0	(Spain) Real Madrid	Paris, France
21:00 CET (UTC+1)	Mbappé 90+4'	Report		Stadium: Parc des Princes; Attendance: 47,443; Referee: Daniele Orsato (Italy)

9 March 2022 Second leg	Real Madrid (Spain)	3–1 (3–2 agg.)	(France) Paris Saint-Germain	Madrid, Spain
21:00 CET (UTC+1)	Benzema 61', 76', 78'	Report	Mbappé 39'	Stadium: Santiago Bernabéu; Attendance: 59,895; Referee: Danny Makkelie (Netherlands)

===== Quarter-finals =====
The draw for the quarter-finals and semi-finals was held on 18 March 2022.

6 April 2022 First leg	Chelsea (England)	1–3	(Spain) Real Madrid	London, England
20:00 BST (UTC+1)	Havertz 40'	Report	Benzema 21', 24', 46'	Stadium: Stamford Bridge; Attendance: 38,689; Referee: Clément Turpin (France)

12 April 2022 Second leg	Real Madrid (Spain)	2–3 (a.e.t.) (5–4 agg.)	(England) Chelsea	Madrid, Spain
21:00 CEST (UTC+2)	Rodrygo 80'; Benzema 96'	Report	Mount 15'; Rüdiger 51'; Werner 75'	Stadium: Santiago Bernabéu; Attendance: 59,839; Referee: Szymon Marciniak (Poland)

===== Semi-finals =====
26 April 2022 First leg	Manchester City (England)	4–3	(Spain) Real Madrid	Manchester, England
20:00 BST (UTC+1)	De Bruyne 2'; Gabriel Jesus 11'; Foden 53'; Silva 72'	Report	Benzema 33', 82' (pen.); Vinícius 55'	Stadium: City of Manchester Stadium; Attendance: 52,217; Referee: István Kovács (Romania)

4 May 2022 Second leg	Real Madrid (Spain)	3–1 (a.e.t.) (6–5 agg.)	(England) Manchester City	Madrid, Spain
21:00 CEST (UTC+2)	Rodrygo 90', 90+1'; Benzema 95' (pen.)	Report	Mahrez 73'	Stadium: Santiago Bernabéu; Attendance: 61,416; Referee: Daniele Orsato (Italy)

===== Final =====
28 May 2022 Final	Liverpool (England)	0–1	(Spain) Real Madrid	Saint-Denis, France
21:36 CEST (UTC+2) (Note: The final, originally scheduled for 21:00 CEST, was delayed to 21:36 CEST due to security issues with fans entering the stadium.)		Report	Vinícius 59'	Stadium: Stade de France; Attendance: 75,000; Referee: Clément Turpin (France)

== Statistics ==
=== Squad statistics ===
No.	Pos	Nat	Player	Total		La Liga		Copa del Rey		Champions League		Supercopa de España	
No.	Pos	Nat	Player	Apps	Goals	Apps	Goals	Apps	Goals	Apps	Goals	Apps	Goals
1	GK	(Belgium)	Thibaut Courtois	52	0	36	0	1	0	13	0	2	0
2	DF	(Spain)	Dani Carvajal	36	1	24	1	0	0	11	0	1	0
3	DF	(Brazil)	Éder Militão	50	2	34	1	2	1	12	0	2	0
4	DF	(Austria)	David Alaba	46	3	30	2	3	0	12	1	1	0
5	DF	(Spain)	Jesús Vallejo	8	0	5	0	1	0	2	0	0	0
6	DF	(Spain)	Nacho	42	3	28	3	3	0	9	0	2	0
7	MF	(Belgium)	Eden Hazard	23	1	18	0	2	1	3	0	0	0
8	MF	(Germany)	Toni Kroos	45	3	28	1	3	0	12	2	2	0
9	FW	(France)	Karim Benzema	46	44	32	27	0	0	12	15	2	2
10	MF	(Croatia)	Luka Modrić	45	3	28	2	2	0	13	0	2	1
11	FW	(Spain)	Marco Asensio	42	12	31	10	2	1	8	1	1	0
12	DF	(Brazil)	Marcelo	18	0	12	0	2	0	3	0	1	0
13	GK	(Ukraine)	Andriy Lunin	4	0	2	0	2	0	0	0	0	0
14	MF	(Brazil)	Casemiro	48	1	32	1	3	0	11	0	2	0
15	MF	(Uruguay)	Federico Valverde	46	1	31	0	2	0	11	0	2	1
16	FW	(Serbia)	Luka Jović	19	1	15	1	1	0	3	0	0	0
17	FW	(Spain)	Lucas Vázquez	41	3	29	3	2	0	8	0	2	0
18	FW	(Wales)	Gareth Bale	7	1	5	1	0	0	2	0	0	0
19	MF	(Spain)	Dani Ceballos	18	0	11	0	2	0	5	0	0	0
20	FW	(Brazil)	Vinícius Júnior	52	22	35	17	2	0	13	4	2	1
21	FW	(Brazil)	Rodrygo	49	9	33	4	3	0	11	5	2	0
22	MF	(Spain)	Isco	17	2	14	1	3	1	0	0	0	0
23	DF	(France)	Ferland Mendy	35	2	22	2	1	0	10	0	2	0
24	FW	(Dominican Republic)	Mariano	11	1	9	1	1	0	1	0	0	0
25	MF	(France)	Eduardo Camavinga	40	2	26	2	3	0	10	0	1	0
27	MF	(Spain)	Antonio Blanco	2	0	1	0	0	0	1	0	0	0
29	FW	(Spain)	Juanmi Latasa	1	0	1	0	0	0	0	0	0	0
34	DF	(Spain)	Mario Gila	2	0	2	0	0	0	0	0	0	0
35	DF	(Spain)	Miguel Gutiérrez	4	0	3	0	0	0	1	0	0	0
43	DF	(Spain)	Sergio Santos	1	0	1	0	0	0	0	0	0	0
44	MF	(Dominican Republic)	Peter González	3	0	3	0	0	0	0	0	0	0
	DF	(Spain)	Álvaro Odriozola†	0	0	0	0	0	0	0	0	0	0

Source: Soccerway

^{†} Player left Madrid during the season

=== Goals ===
Rank	Player	La Liga	Copa del Rey	Champions League	Supercopa	Total
1	(France) Karim Benzema	27	0	15	2	44
2	(Brazil) Vinícius Júnior	17	0	4	1	22
3	(Spain) Marco Asensio	10	1	1	0	12
4	(Brazil) Rodrygo	4	0	5	0	9
5	(Austria) David Alaba	2	0	1	0	3
5	(Germany) Toni Kroos	1	0	2	0	3
5	(Croatia) Luka Modrić	2	0	0	1	3
5	(Spain) Nacho	3	0	0	0	3
5	(Spain) Lucas Vázquez	3	0	0	0	3
10	(France) Eduardo Camavinga	2	0	0	0	2
10	(Spain) Isco	1	1	0	0	2
10	(France) Ferland Mendy	2	0	0	0	2
10	(Brazil) Éder Militão	1	1	0	0	2
14	(Wales) Gareth Bale	1	0	0	0	1
14	(Spain) Dani Carvajal	1	0	0	0	1
14	(Brazil) Casemiro	1	0	0	0	1
14	(Belgium) Eden Hazard	0	1	0	0	1
14	(Serbia) Luka Jović	1	0	0	0	1
14	(Dominican Republic) Mariano	1	0	0	0	1
14	(Uruguay) Federico Valverde	0	0	0	1	1
Own goals		0	1	1	0	2
Total		80	5	29	5	119

=== Clean sheets ===
Rank	Player	La Liga	Copa del Rey	Champions League	Supercopa	Total
1	(Belgium) Thibaut Courtois	16	0	5	1	22
2	(Ukraine) Andriy Lunin	0	0	0	0	0
Total		16	0	5	1	22

=== Disciplinary record ===
N	P	Nat.	Name	La Liga			Copa del Rey			Champions League			Supercopa			Total			Notes
N	P	Nat.	Name	Yellow card	Second yellow card	Red card	Yellow card	Second yellow card	Red card	Yellow card	Second yellow card	Red card	Yellow card	Second yellow card	Red card	Yellow card	Second yellow card	Red card	Notes
3	DF	(Brazil)	Éder Militão	5						4					1	9		1	
12	DF	(Brazil)	Marcelo						1									1	
14	MF	(Brazil)	Casemiro	11			1			3			1			16			
25	MF	(France)	Eduardo Camavinga	9			1			1						11			
6	DF	(Spain)	Nacho	7						2						9			
10	MF	(Croatia)	Luka Modrić	5			1			1						7			
23	DF	(France)	Ferland Mendy	4						3						7			
20	FW	(Brazil)	Vinícius Júnior	6												6			
8	MF	(Germany)	Toni Kroos	4			2									6			
15	MF	(Uruguay)	Federico Valverde	2						2			1			5			
21	FW	(Brazil)	Rodrygo	3			1			1						5			
2	DF	(Spain)	Dani Carvajal	1						3						4			
4	DF	(Austria)	David Alaba	2			1			1						4			
17	MF	(Spain)	Lucas Vázquez	3						1						4			
7	FW	(Belgium)	Eden Hazard	2												2			
11	FW	(Spain)	Marco Asensio	2												2			
16	FW	(Serbia)	Luka Jović	1						1						2			
18	FW	(Wales)	Gareth Bale	2												2			
24	FW	(Dominican Republic)	Mariano	2												2			
1	GK	(Belgium)	Thibaut Courtois	1												1			
5	DF	(Spain)	Jesús Vallejo	1												1			
9	FW	(France)	Karim Benzema							1						1			
22	MF	(Spain)	Isco	1												1			
35	DF	(Spain)	Miguel Gutiérrez	1												1			

Source: Soccerway
Only competitive matches
(yellow card) = Number of bookings; (second yellow card) = Number of sending offs after a second yellow card; (red card) = Number of sending offs by a direct red card.
