= Juan Artola =

Juan Artola may refer to:

- Juan Artola (footballer, born 1895) (Juan Artola Letamendía, 1895–1935), Spanish football midfielder
- Juan Artola (footballer, born 2000) (Juan Artola Canales), Spanish football forward
