= Dani Ceballos =

Spanish footballer (born 1996)

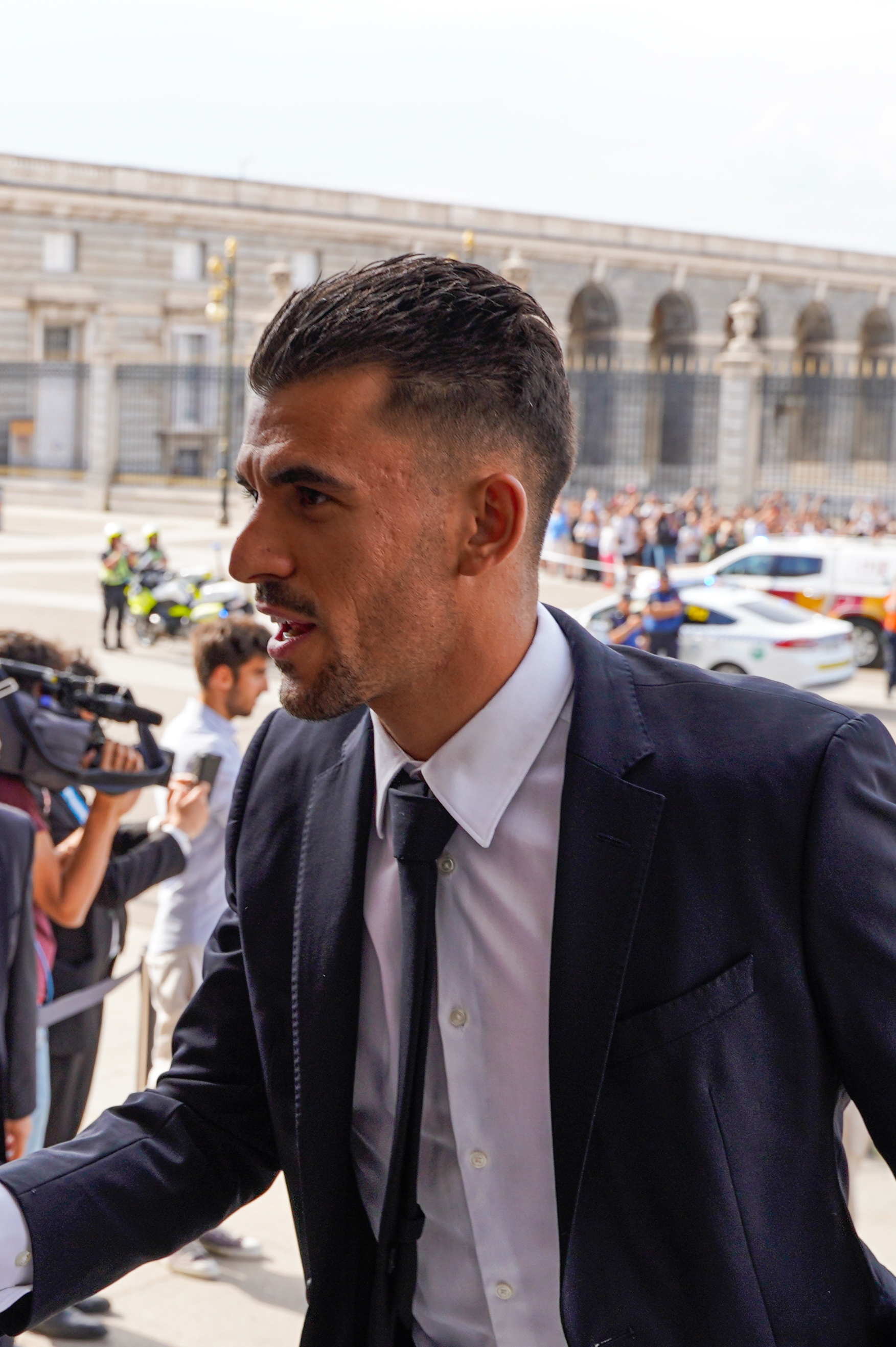
- Ceballos in 2022

Personal information
- Full name: Daniel Ceballos Fernández
- Date of birth: 7 August 1996 (age 30)
- Place of birth: Utrera, Spain
- Height: 1.79 m (5 ft 10 in)
- Position: Central midfielder

Team information
- Current team: Betis
- Number: 25

Youth career
- 2004–2009: Sevilla
- 2009–2011: Utrera
- 2011–2014: Betis

Senior career*
Years	Team	Apps	(Gls)
2014–2015	Betis B	4	(0)
2014–2017	Betis	98	(7)
2017–2026	Real Madrid	135	(5)
2019–2021	→ Arsenal (loan)	49	(0)
2026–	Betis	8	(0)

International career
2014–2015	Spain U19	13	(0)
2015–2019	Spain U21	29	(8)
2021	Spain Olympic (O.P.)	2	(0)
2018–2023	Spain	13	(1)
Medal record
Men's football
Representing Spain
Olympic Games
Silver medal – second place	2020 Tokyo	Team
UEFA European Under-21 Championship
Winner	2019 Italy
Runner-up	2017 Poland
UEFA European Under-19 Championship
Winner	2015 Greece
- * Club domestic league appearances and goals as of 18:46, 8 November 2026 (UTC)

Daniel Ceballos Fernández (born 7 August 1996) is a Spanish professional footballer who plays as a central midfielder for La Liga club Real Betis.

Ceballos started his career at Real Betis, where he helped them win the Segunda División. He was signed by Real Madrid in 2017, and two years later signed for Premier League club Arsenal on loan. He spent two seasons at Arsenal, winning the FA Cup in 2020, before returning to Real Madrid in 2021. During his time with Madrid, he won 16 trophies, including three UEFA Champions League titles, two La Liga titles and the Copa del Rey. He left the club by mutual agreement in 2026 and re-signed for former club Real Betis.

Ceballos won his first cap for Spain in September 2018, in 6–0 home win over Croatia in the UEFA Nations League.

== Club career ==
=== Real Betis ===
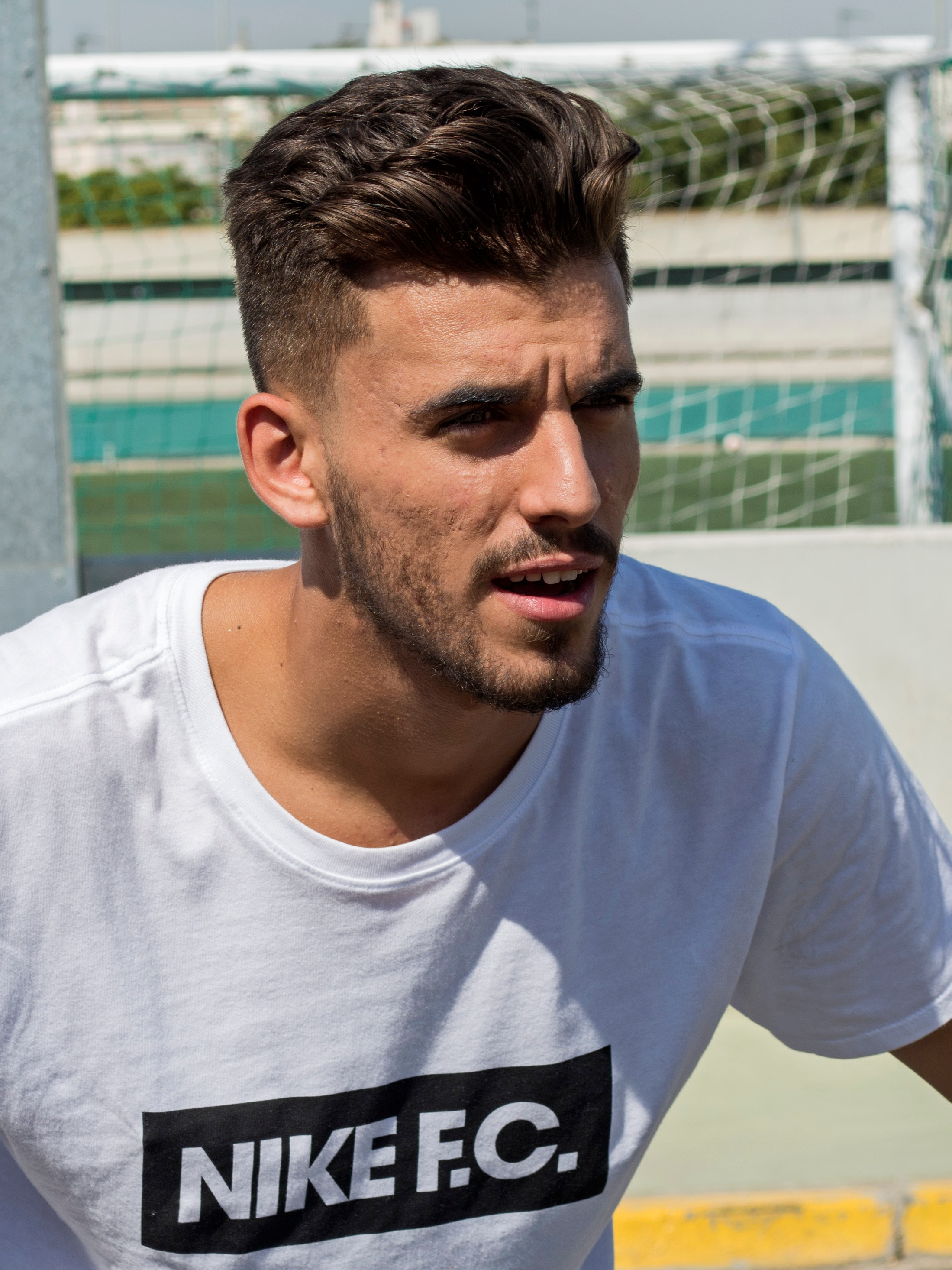
Ceballos at the Real Betis training ground, 2015

Ceballos was born in Utrera, Andalusia. He joined Sevilla's youth system in 2004 at the age of eight, but was released in 2009 due to a chronic bronchitis problem. He subsequently played for hometown club Utrera, and completed his development with Real Betis after signing in 2011. He signed a professional contract with Betis on 22 February 2014, while still a junior.

On 26 April 2014, without even appearing for the B team, Ceballos played his first game with the club's main squad, coming on as a late substitute in a 1–0 La Liga home loss against Real Sociedad. He scored his first goal on 21 December, with the first of a 2–0 home win over Racing Santander in the Segunda División championship. He featured in 33 matches and scored 5 times during the 2014–15 Segunda División season, as Betis returned to La Liga at the first attempt.

On 15 October 2015, after lengthy negotiations, Ceballos renewed his contract until June 2020. He scored his first goal in the Spanish top flight on 16 April 2017, with the last goal in a 2–0 home win against Eibar.

=== Real Madrid ===
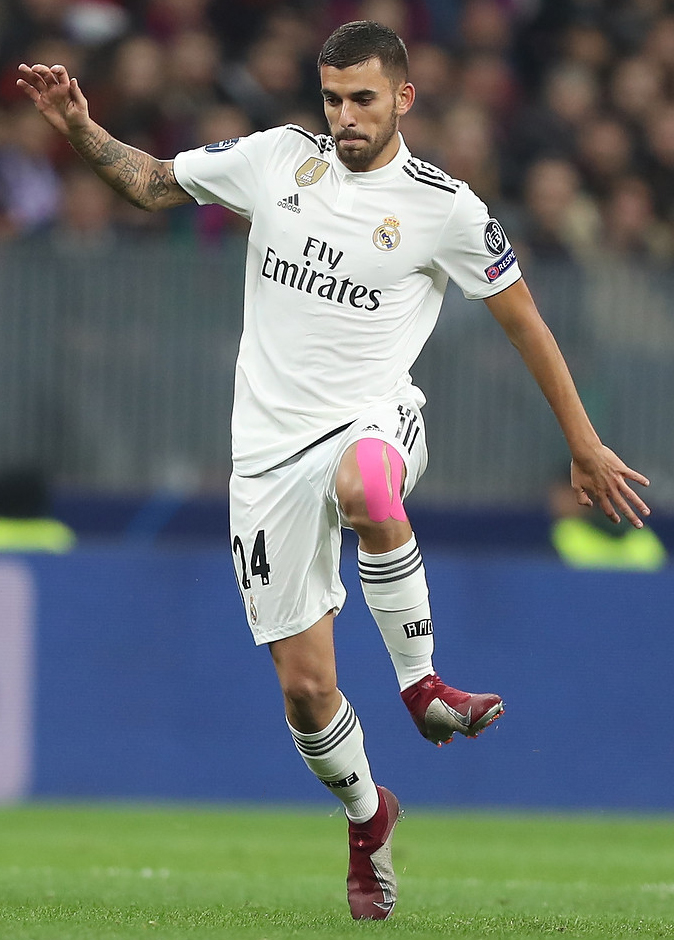
Ceballos playing for Real Madrid in 2018

On 14 July 2017, Ceballos signed for La Liga club Real Madrid on a six-year contract, for a transfer fee of around €18 million. He made his debut on 16 August, replacing Toni Kroos on the 80th minute of the second leg of the 2017 Supercopa de España, a 2–0 home victory over Barcelona. On 23 September, in his first start, he scored two goals in a 2–1 away win over Alavés.

Ceballos made four appearances during the 2017–18 UEFA Champions League, as Madrid won their third consecutive and 13th overall title in the tournament. On 13 January 2019, after only 15 minutes on the pitch and having been constantly booed by his former club's supporters, he scored from a free kick in the last minute of a 2–1 victory against Betis at the Estadio Benito Villamarín.

==== Loan to Arsenal ====
On 25 July 2019, Ceballos joined Premier League club Arsenal on a season-long loan. He made his first start for Arsenal on 17 August in a 2–1 victory over Burnley, providing two assists in a man-of-the-match performance. On 3 October, Ceballos scored his first goal for Arsenal in a 4–0 home victory against Standard Liège in the group stage of the 2019–20 UEFA Europa League. On 28 June 2020, he scored his second Arsenal goal against Sheffield United in stoppage time to secure a 1–2 win in the quarter-final of the 2019–20 FA Cup. He played the full 90 minutes in the final, in which Arsenal beat Chelsea 2–1 at Wembley Stadium.

On 4 September 2020, Ceballos was loaned to Arsenal for another season. In one of the interviews, he stated that the manager, Mikel Arteta, was the main reason why he decided to stay at Arsenal, and that since joining the club he had become a much more mature player, having improved a lot.

==== Return to Real Madrid ====
Ceballos missed several months of the 2021–22 season due to a heavy injury on his left ankle that he suffered in Spain's opening game against Egypt in the 2020 Summer Olympics. His first appearance upon his return came on 5 January 2022 as a substitute in a 3–1 away win over CD Alcoyano in the third round of 2021–22 Copa del Rey. On 28 May 2022, he came on as a substitute for Luka Modrić in the 2022 UEFA Champions League final, which saw Madrid achieve a 1–0 win over Liverpool to lift the title.

Ceballos provided an assist and scored the winning goal in a 3–2 comeback victory in the 2022–23 Copa del Rey round of 16 match against Villarreal on 19 January 2023.

On 23 June 2023, Ceballos had an agreement with Los Blancos to extend the contract until 30 June 2027. Later that year, on 12 December, he scored his first Champions League goal, securing a 3–2 away win over Union Berlin.

On 26 June 2026, Real Madrid and Ceballos reached a mutual agreement to terminate his contract, leaving the club after nine years.

=== Return to Real Betis ===
On 1 September 2026, Ceballos returned to La Liga club Real Betis on a three-year contract until 30 June 2029.

== International career ==
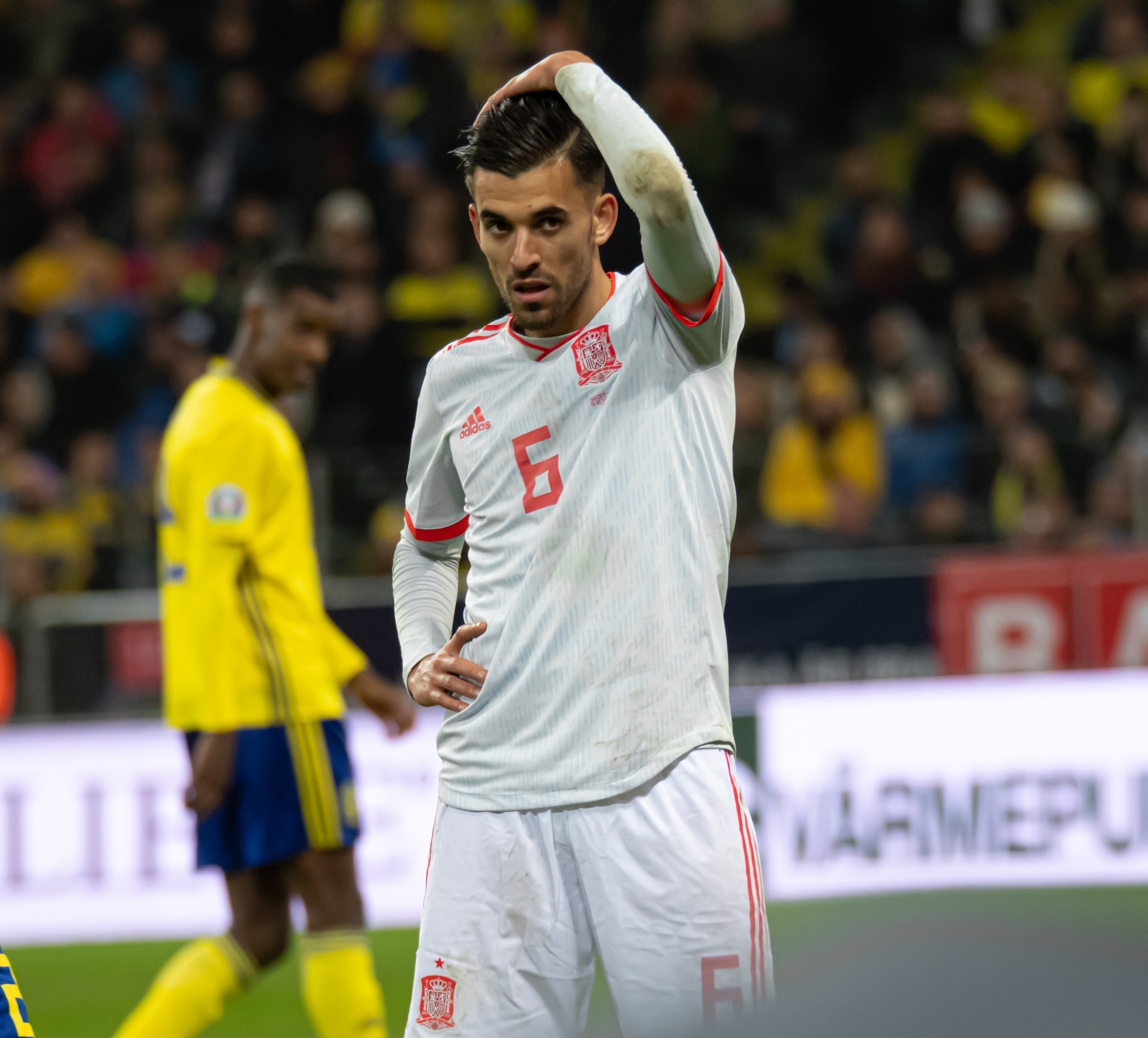
Ceballos playing for Spain 2019

On 5 November 2014, Ceballos was called up to the Spain under-19 side, appearing against Germany, France and Greece in a tournament played in the latter nation. He made his debut for the under-21s on 26 March 2015, replacing Samu Castillejo at half-time of a 2–0 friendly win over Norway in Cartagena; four days later, in León, he made his first start, in a 4–0 win over Belarus.

Despite beginning the competition in Poland on the bench, Ceballos' performances at the 2017 UEFA European Under-21 Championship led Spain to the second place. Subsequently, he was named the player of the tournament. With the under-21 side he also took part in the victorious 2019 UEFA European Under-21 Championship Spain team. He was named in the team of the tournament for the second successive tournament.

Ceballos won his first cap for the senior team on 11 September 2018, playing the entire 6–0 home win over Croatia in the 2018–19 UEFA Nations League. He scored his first goal for his country on 15 November, in a 3–2 loss in Zagreb against the same opponent and in the same competition.

On 29 June 2021, Ceballos was included as one of three overaged players in Spain's preliminary squad for the 2020 Summer Olympics after having missed out on Euro 2020 due to injury. In July 2021, he was included in the 22-player squad of the under-23 team for the 2020 Summer Olympics.

== Personal life ==
Since 2023, Ceballos has been in a relationship with Luna Serrat, granddaughter of singer Joan Manuel Serrat.

== Career statistics ==
=== Club ===
As of match played 12 November 2026

Appearances and goals by club, season and competition
Club	Season	League			National cup (Note: Includes Copa del Rey, FA Cup)		League cup (Note: Includes EFL Cup)		Europe		Other		Total	
Club	Season	Division	Apps	Goals	Apps	Goals	Apps	Goals	Apps	Goals	Apps	Goals	Apps	Goals
Real Betis	2013–14	La Liga	1	0	0	0	—		—		—		1	0
Real Betis	2014–15	Segunda División	33	5	2	0	—		—		—		35	5
Real Betis	2015–16	La Liga	34	0	4	0	—		—		—		38	0
Real Betis	2016–17	La Liga	30	2	1	0	—		—		—		31	2
Real Betis	Total		98	7	7	0	—		—		—		105	7
Real Betis B	2014–15	Segunda División B	4	0	—		—		—		—		4	0
Real Madrid	2017–18	La Liga	12	2	5	0	—		4 (Note: Appearances in UEFA Champions League)	0	1 (Note: Appearance(s) in Supercopa de España)	0	22	2
Real Madrid	2018–19	La Liga	23	3	6	0	—		3	0	2 (Note: One appearance in UEFA Super Cup, one appearance in FIFA Club World Cup)	0	34	3
Real Madrid	2021–22	La Liga	11	0	2	0	—		5	0	0	0	18	0
Real Madrid	2022–23	La Liga	30	0	4	1	—		7	0	5 (Note: One appearance in UEFA Super Cup, two appearances in Supercopa de España, two appearances in FIFA Club World Cup)	0	46	1
Real Madrid	2023–24	La Liga	20	0	2	0	—		3	1	2	0	27	1
Real Madrid	2024–25	La Liga	23	0	5	0	—		9	0	8 (Note: One appearance in UEFA Super Cup, one appearance in FIFA Intercontinental Cup, two appearances in Supercopa de España, four appearances in FIFA Club World Cup)	0	45	0
Real Madrid	2025–26	La Liga	16	0	1	0	—		4	0	2	0	23	0
Real Madrid	Total		135	5	25	1	—		35	1	20	0	215	7
Arsenal (loan)	2019–20	Premier League	24	0	5	1	2	0	6 (Note: Appearances in UEFA Europa League)	1	—		37	2
Arsenal (loan)	2020–21	Premier League	25	0	0	0	3	0	12	0	—		40	0
Arsenal (loan)	Total		49	0	5	1	5	0	18	1	—		77	2
Real Betis	2026–27	La Liga	8	0	1	0	—		3	0	—		12	0
Career total			294	12	38	2	5	0	56	2	20	0	413	16

=== International ===
As of match played 28 March 2023

Appearances and goals by national team and year
National team	Year	Apps	Goals
Spain	2018	5	1
Spain	2019	4	0
Spain	2020	2	0
Spain	2023	2	0
Total		13	1

As of match played 28 March 2023
Spain score listed first, score column indicates score after each Ceballos goal.

List of international goals scored by Dani Ceballos
No.	Date	Venue	Cap	Opponent	Score	Result	Competition	Ref.
1	15 November 2018	Stadion Maksimir, Zagreb, Croatia	4	Croatia	1–1	2–3	2018–19 UEFA Nations League A	

== Honours ==
Real Betis

- Segunda División: 2014–15

Real Madrid

- La Liga: 2021–22, 2023–24
- Copa del Rey: 2022–23
- Supercopa de España: 2017, 2022, 2024
- UEFA Champions League: 2017–18, 2021–22, 2023–24
- UEFA Super Cup: 2022, 2024
- FIFA Club World Cup: 2017, 2018, 2022
- FIFA Intercontinental Cup: 2024

Arsenal

- FA Cup: 2019–20

Spain U19

- UEFA European Under-19 Championship: 2015

Spain U21

- UEFA European Under-21 Championship: 2019; runner-up: 2017

Spain Olympic

- Summer Olympic silver medal: 2020

Individual

- UEFA European Under-21 Championship Player of the Tournament: 2017
- UEFA European Under-21 Championship Team of the Tournament: 2017
