= Nico Serrano =

Spanish footballer

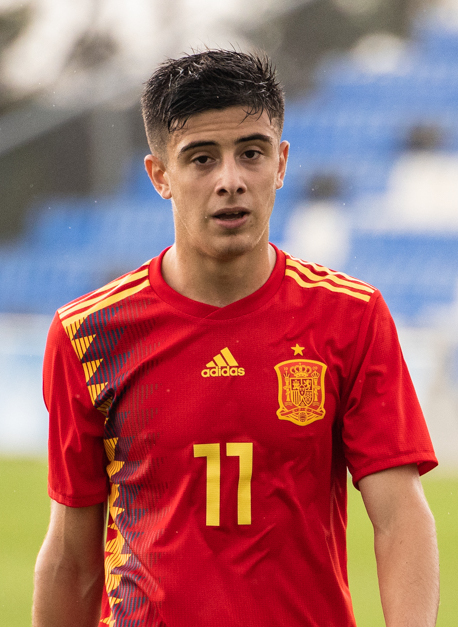
- Serrano in October 2019

Personal information
- Full name: Nicolás Serrano Galdeano
- Date of birth: 5 March 2003 (age 23)
- Place of birth: Pamplona, Spain
- Height: 1.76 m (5 ft 9 in)
- Position: Winger

Team information
- Current team: Athletic Bilbao
- Number: 22

Youth career
- Txantrea
- Osasuna
- 2015–2018: Villarreal
- 2018–2020: Athletic Bilbao

Senior career*
Years	Team	Apps	(Gls)
2020–2022	Bilbao Athletic	38	(6)
2021–	Athletic Bilbao	35	(2)
2022–2023	→ Mirandés (loan)	16	(0)
2023	→ PEC Zwolle (loan)	10	(0)
2024	→ Racing Ferrol (loan)	14	(4)
2025	→ Sporting Gijón (loan)	18	(2)

International career^{‡}
2019	Spain U16	5	(4)
2019–2020	Spain U17	6	(3)
2019	Spain U18	2	(0)
2021–2022	Spain U19	9	(6)
2025–	Basque Country	1	(0)
- * Club domestic league appearances and goals as of 19 September 2026 ‡ National team caps and goals as of 15 November 2025

Nicolás "Nico" Serrano Galdeano (born 5 March 2003) is a Spanish professional footballer who plays as a winger for Athletic Bilbao.

== Club career ==
Born in Pamplona, Navarre, Serrano joined Villarreal CF's youth setup in 2015, aged 12, after representing UDC Txantrea and CA Osasuna. In August 2018, at the age of 15, he signed for Athletic Bilbao.

In May 2020, after finishing his formation, Serrano was promoted straight to the reserves, without playing for CD Basconia, the farm team, and signed a professional contract late in the month. He made his senior debut on 18 July, coming on as a second-half substitute for Juan Artola in a 1–1 home draw against CD Badajoz, in the 2020 Segunda División B play-offs.

Serrano scored his first senior goal on 7 November 2020, netting the opener in a 2–1 home win over SD Amorebieta. In June of the following year, he was called up by manager Marcelino to make the pre-season with the main squad.

Serrano made his first team – and La Liga – debut on 11 September 2021, replacing Iñaki Williams late into a 2–0 home win over RCD Mallorca. On 11 August of the following year, he was loaned to Segunda División side CD Mirandés for the season.

On 10 August 2023, Serrano moved on a new season-long loan to PEC Zwolle in the Netherlands. In January 2024, his loan at Zwolle was terminated to allow him to join Racing de Ferrol until the end of the season.

On 31 January 2025, after featuring rarely for the Lions, Serrano joined Sporting de Gijón in the second division on loan. He later returned to his parent club Athletic Bilbao, scoring his first UEFA Champions League goal in a 3–2 away win over Atalanta on 21 January 2026.

== International career ==
Serrano represented Spain at under-16, under-17 and under-18 levels. He was called up to the Basque Country national team for a friendly match against Palestine on 15 November 2025.

== Personal life ==
Serrano is a cousin of television personality and influencer Sofía Suescun.

== Career statistics ==
=== Club ===
As of match played 19 September 2026

Appearances and goals by club, season and competition
Club	Season	League			National cup (Note: Includes Copa del Rey, KNVB Cup.)		Continental		Other		Total	
Club	Season	Division	Apps	Goals	Apps	Goals	Apps	Goals	Apps	Goals	Apps	Goals
Bilbao Athletic	2019–20	Segunda División B	1	0	—		—		—		1	0
Bilbao Athletic	2020–21	Segunda División B	24	3	—		—		—		24	3
Bilbao Athletic	2021–22	Primera División RFEF	14	3	—		—		—		14	3
Bilbao Athletic	Total		40	6	—		—		—		40	6
Athletic Bilbao	2021–22	La Liga	14	1	2	0	—		1 (Note: Appearance in Supercopa de España)	0	17	1
Athletic Bilbao	2024–25	La Liga	4	0	2	0	3 (Note: Appearances in UEFA Europa League)	1	1 (Note: Appearance in Supercopa de España)	0	10	1
Athletic Bilbao	2025–26	La Liga	13	1	3	0	5 (Note: Appearances in UEFA Champions League)	1	0	0	21	2
Athletic Bilbao	2026–27	La Liga	1	0	0	0	—		—		1	0
Athletic Bilbao	Total		32	2	7	0	8	2	2	0	49	4
Mirandés (loan)	2022–23	Segunda División	16	0	0	0	—		—		16	0
PEC Zwolle (loan)	2023–24	Eredivisie	10	0	1	0	—		—		11	0
Racing Ferrol (loan)	2023–24	Segunda División	14	4	—		—		—		14	4
Sporting Gijón (loan)	2024–25	Segunda División	18	2	—		—		—		18	2
Career total			130	14	8	0	8	2	2	0	148	16
