= Álex Petxarroman =

Spanish footballer

Personal information
- Full name: Alexander Petxarroman Eizaguirre
- Date of birth: 6 February 1997 (age 29)
- Place of birth: San Sebastián, Spain
- Height: 1.80 m (5 ft 11 in)
- Position: Right-back

Team information
- Current team: Ceuta
- Number: 18

Youth career
- Antiguoko
- 2010–2015: Real Sociedad

Senior career*
Years	Team	Apps	(Gls)
2015–2017	Real Sociedad C	50	(1)
2017–2021	Real Sociedad B	57	(3)
2017–2018	→ Gernika (loan)	13	(1)
2021–2023	Athletic Bilbao	17	(0)
2022–2023	→ Andorra (loan)	13	(0)
2023–2024	Andorra	31	(1)
2024–2026	Deportivo La Coruña	27	(0)
2025–2026	→ Andorra (loan)	16	(0)
2026–	Ceuta	0	(0)
- * Club domestic league appearances and goals as of 9 June 2026

Alexander "Álex" Petxarroman Eizaguirre (born 6 February 1997), sometimes referred as Álex Petxa, is a Spanish professional footballer who plays as a right-back for Segunda División club AD Ceuta FC.

== Career ==
=== Real Sociedad ===
Born in San Sebastián, Gipuzkoa, Basque Country, Petxarroman joined Real Sociedad's youth setup in 2010, from Antiguoko. Promoted to farm team CD Berio FT in July 2015, he made his senior debut during the campaign, in Tercera División.

On 9 August 2017, after one season with the C-team (as Berio was fully integrated into the club's structure), Petxarroman was loaned to Segunda División B side Gernika Club, for one year. Upon returning in July 2018, he was assigned to Real Sociedad's reserves also in the third division.

Petxarroman spent most of the 2019–20 campaign sidelined due to a knee injury suffered in October 2019. He was a key component and team captain of the B's in 2020–21, playing in 20 league matches (play-offs included) and scoring twice as his side returned to Segunda División after an absence of 59 years.

On 3 June 2021, Petxarroman failed to agree a contract renewal with Real Sociedad and left the club after eleven years.

=== Athletic Bilbao ===
On 1 July 2021, Petxarroman signed a three-year contract with La Liga side Athletic Bilbao. He made his professional debut on 31 October, replacing Óscar de Marcos late into a 1–1 away draw against his former side Real Sociedad.

=== Andorra ===
On 10 August 2022, Petxarroman was loaned to Segunda División newcomers FC Andorra for the season. On 24 July of the following year, he signed a permanent two-year contract with the club.

=== Deportivo La Coruña ===
On 15 July 2024, after Andorra's relegation, Petxarroman signed a four-year deal with Deportivo de La Coruña, newly promoted to division two.

==== Andorra return (loan) ====
On 14 August 2025, Petxarroman returned to Andorra on a one-year loan deal, with a buyout clause.

=== Ceuta ===
On 10 July 2026, Petxarroman moved to fellow second division side AD Ceuta FC on a one-year contract.

== Career statistics ==
=== Club ===
As of match played 15 May 2022

Appearances and goals by club, season and competition
Club	Season	League			National Cup		Continental		Other		Total	
Club	Season	Division	Apps	Goals	Apps	Goals	Apps	Goals	Apps	Goals	Apps	Goals
Real Sociedad C	2015–16	Tercera División	27	1	—		—		—		27	1
Real Sociedad C	2016–17	Tercera División	23	0	—		—		—		23	0
Real Sociedad C	Total		50	1	—		—		—		50	1
Gernika (loan)	2017–18	Segunda División B	13	1	—		—		—		13	1
Real Sociedad B	2018–19	Segunda División B	33	0	—		—		—		33	0
Real Sociedad B	2019–20	Segunda División B	6	1	—		—		—		6	1
Real Sociedad B	2020–21	Segunda División B	18	2	—		—		2 (Note: Appearance(s) in Segunda División B play-offs)	0	20	2
Real Sociedad B	Total		57	3	—		—		2	0	59	3
Athletic Bilbao	2021–22	La Liga	17	0	2	0	—		0	0	19	0
Career total			137	5	2	0	0	0	2	0	141	5
