= Juan Artola (footballer, born 2000) =

Spanish footballer

Personal information
- Full name: Juan Artola Canales
- Date of birth: 7 April 2000 (age 26)
- Place of birth: Bilbao, Spain
- Height: 1.76 m (5 ft 9 in)
- Position: Winger

Team information
- Current team: Unionistas
- Number: 12

Youth career
- Romo
- 2010–2018: Athletic Bilbao

Senior career*
Years	Team	Apps	(Gls)
2018–2019	Basconia	29	(5)
2019–2022	Bilbao Athletic	85	(24)
2022–2024	Athletic Bilbao	0	(0)
2022–2023	→ Burgos (loan)	32	(3)
2023–2024	→ Alcorcón (loan)	29	(0)
2024–2025	Cultural Leonesa	33	(2)
2025–2026	Mérida	18	(0)
2026–	Unionistas	13	(1)
- * Club domestic league appearances and goals as of 9 June 2026

Juan Artola Canales (born 7 April 2000) is a Spanish professional footballer who plays as a right winger for Primera Federación club Unionistas.

== Club career ==
Artola was born in Bilbao, Biscay, Basque Country, and joined Athletic Bilbao's youth setup in 2010, from Romo FC. He made his senior debut with the farm team in the 2018–19 season, in Tercera División.

Artola made his debut for the reserves on 8 September 2019, coming on as a second-half substitute for Oier Zarraga in a 2–5 Segunda División B away loss against Cultural y Deportiva Leonesa. He scored his first goals for the side six days later, netting a brace in a 4–0 home routing of Salamanca CF UDS.

On 26 March 2021, Artola renewed his contract with the Lions until 2025. In June, he was called up by manager Marcelino to make the pre-season with the main squad.

Artola made his first team debut for the Lions on 6 January 2022, playing the last 14 minutes in a 2–0 away win over Atlético Mancha Real, for the season's Copa del Rey. On 7 July, he was loaned to Segunda División side Burgos CF for the season.

Artola made his professional debut on 14 August 2022, starting and scoring the winner in a 1–0 home success over Málaga CF. On 25 July of the following year, he moved to fellow second division side AD Alcorcón also in a temporary one-year deal.

On 2 August 2024, Artola terminated his link with the Lions and joined Primera Federación side Cultural y Deportiva Leonesa.

On 2 February 2026, Artola signed with Unionistas in the third tier.
