= Oier Zarraga =

Spanish footballer

Personal information
- Full name: Oier Zarraga Egaña
- Date of birth: 4 January 1999 (age 27)
- Place of birth: Getxo, Spain
- Height: 1.75 m (5 ft 9 in)
- Position: Central midfielder

Team information
- Current team: Udinese
- Number: 6

Youth career
- Romo
- 2009–2017: Athletic Bilbao

Senior career*
Years	Team	Apps	(Gls)
2017–2019	Basconia	63	(7)
2019–2021	Bilbao Athletic	38	(7)
2020–2023	Athletic Bilbao	62	(1)
2023–	Udinese	61	(3)

International career^{‡}
2024–	Basque Country	1	(0)
- * Club domestic league appearances and goals as of 25 May 2026 ‡ National team caps and goals as of 24 March 2024

Oier Zarraga Egaña (born 4 January 1999) is a Spanish professional footballer who plays as a central midfielder for Serie A club Udinese.

== Career ==
=== Athletic Bilbao ===
Born in Getxo, Biscay, Basque Country, Zarraga joined Athletic Bilbao's youth setup in 2009, from hometown side Romo FC. He made his senior debut with the farm team during the 2017–18 season, in Tercera División.

Zarraga made his debut with the reserves on 3 February 2019, coming on as a second-half substitute for Gaizka Larrazabal in a 2–1 Segunda División B home win against SD Leioa. Definitely promoted to the B-side in June 2019, he subsequently became a regular starter for the team, playing in all matches of the 2019–20 campaign before the season was curtailed due to the COVID-19 pandemic.

In July 2020, Zarraga was called up to the pre-season with the main squad. He made his professional – and La Liga – debut on 18 October, replacing Unai López in a 2–0 home win against Levante UD. In February 2021 he signed a new contract running to summer 2023, also confirming his status as a first team squad member.

=== Udinese ===
On 29 June 2023, Zarraga moved abroad for the first time in his career, signing a four-year contract with Serie A side Udinese Calcio.

== International career ==
Zarraga was called up to the Basque Country national team for a friendly match against Palestine on 15 November 2025.

== Career statistics ==
As of match played 25 May 2025

Appearances and goals by club, season and competition
Club	Season	League			National cup		Other		Total	
Club	Season	Division	Apps	Goals	Apps	Goals	Apps	Goals	Apps	Goals
Bilbao Athletic	2018–19	Segunda División B	1	0	—		—		1	0
Bilbao Athletic	2019–20	Segunda División B	28	5	—		1 (Note: Appearance in Promotion Playoffs)	0	29	5
Bilbao Athletic	2020–21	Segunda División B	9	2	—		—		9	2
Bilbao Athletic	Total		38	7	0	0	1	0	39	7
Athletic Bilbao	2020–21	La Liga	5	0	0	0	—		5	0
Athletic Bilbao	2021–22	La Liga	31	1	4	0	2 (Note: Appearances in Supercopa de España)	0	37	1
Athletic Bilbao	2022–23	La Liga	26	0	4	1	—		30	1
Athletic Bilbao	Total		62	1	8	1	2	0	72	2
Udinese	2023–24	Serie A	15	2	2	0	—		17	2
Udinese	2024–25	Serie A	22	1	2	0	—		24	1
Udinese	Total		37	3	4	0	0	0	41	3
Career total			137	11	12	1	3	0	152	12
