= 2022 Supercopa de España =

Spanish football competition played in Saudi Arabia

Tournament details
- Host country: Saudi Arabia
- Dates: 12–16 January 2022
- Teams: 4
- Venue: 1 (in 1 host city)

Final positions
- Champions: Real Madrid (12th title)
- Runners-up: Athletic Bilbao

Tournament statistics
- Matches played: 3
- Goals scored: 10 (3.33 per match)
- Attendance: 72,000 (24,000 per match)
- Top scorer(s): Karim Benzema (2 goals)

The 2022 Supercopa de España was the 38th edition of the Supercopa de España, an annual football competition for clubs in the Spanish football league system that were successful in its major competitions in the preceding season.

After the previous season's edition was held in Andalusia, Spain due to travel restrictions related to the COVID-19 pandemic, this year the tournament returned to Saudi Arabia as per the deal with the Royal Spanish Football Federation.

Real Madrid won the tournament for their twelfth Supercopa de España title.

== Qualification ==
The tournament featured the winners and runners-up of the 2020–21 Copa del Rey and 2020–21 La Liga.

=== Qualified teams ===
The following four teams qualified for the tournament.

Team	Method of qualification	Appearance	Last appearance as	Previous performance		
Team	Method of qualification	Appearance	Last appearance as	Winner(s)	Runners-up	Semi-finalists
Barcelona	2020–21 Copa del Rey winners	26th	2021 runners-up	13	11	1
Atlético Madrid	2020–21 La Liga winners	8th	2020 runners-up	2	5	–
Athletic Bilbao	2020–21 Copa del Rey runners-up	6th	2021 winners	3	2	–
Real Madrid	2020–21 La Liga runners-up	18th	2021 semi-finalists	11	5	1

== Venue ==
All three matches were held at the King Fahd International Stadium in Riyadh, Saudi Arabia.

Location of the host city of the 2022 Supercopa de España.	City	Stadium
Location of the host city of the 2022 Supercopa de España.	Riyadh	King Fahd International Stadium
Location of the host city of the 2022 Supercopa de España.	Capacity: 58,398	

== Matches ==
- Times listed are SAST (UTC+3).

=== Bracket ===
Semi-finals
13 January 2022 – Riyadh
Atlético Madrid	1
Athletic Bilbao	2
12 January 2022 – Riyadh
Barcelona	2
Real Madrid (a.e.t.)	3

Final
16 January 2022 – Riyadh
Athletic Bilbao	0
Real Madrid	2

=== Semi-finals ===
12 January 2022
22:00

Barcelona	2–3 (a.e.t.)	Real Madrid
L. de Jong 41'; Fati 83'	Report	Vinícius 25'; Benzema 72'; Valverde 98'

King Fahd International Stadium, Riyadh
Attendance: 35,000
Referee: José Luis Munuera Montero (Andalusia)

13 January 2022
22:00

Atlético Madrid	1–2	Athletic Bilbao
Simón 62' (o.g.)	Report	Yeray 77'; N. Williams 81'

King Fahd International Stadium, Riyadh
Attendance: 7,000
Referee: Guillermo Cuadra Fernández (Balearic Islands)

=== Final ===
16 January 2022
21:30

Athletic Bilbao	0–2	Real Madrid
	Report	Modrić 38'; Benzema 52' (pen.)

King Fahd International Stadium, Riyadh
Attendance: 30,000
Referee: César Soto Grado (La Rioja)

== See also ==
- 2021–22 La Liga
- 2021–22 Copa del Rey
