= Guillermo Cuadra Fernández =

Spanish football referee

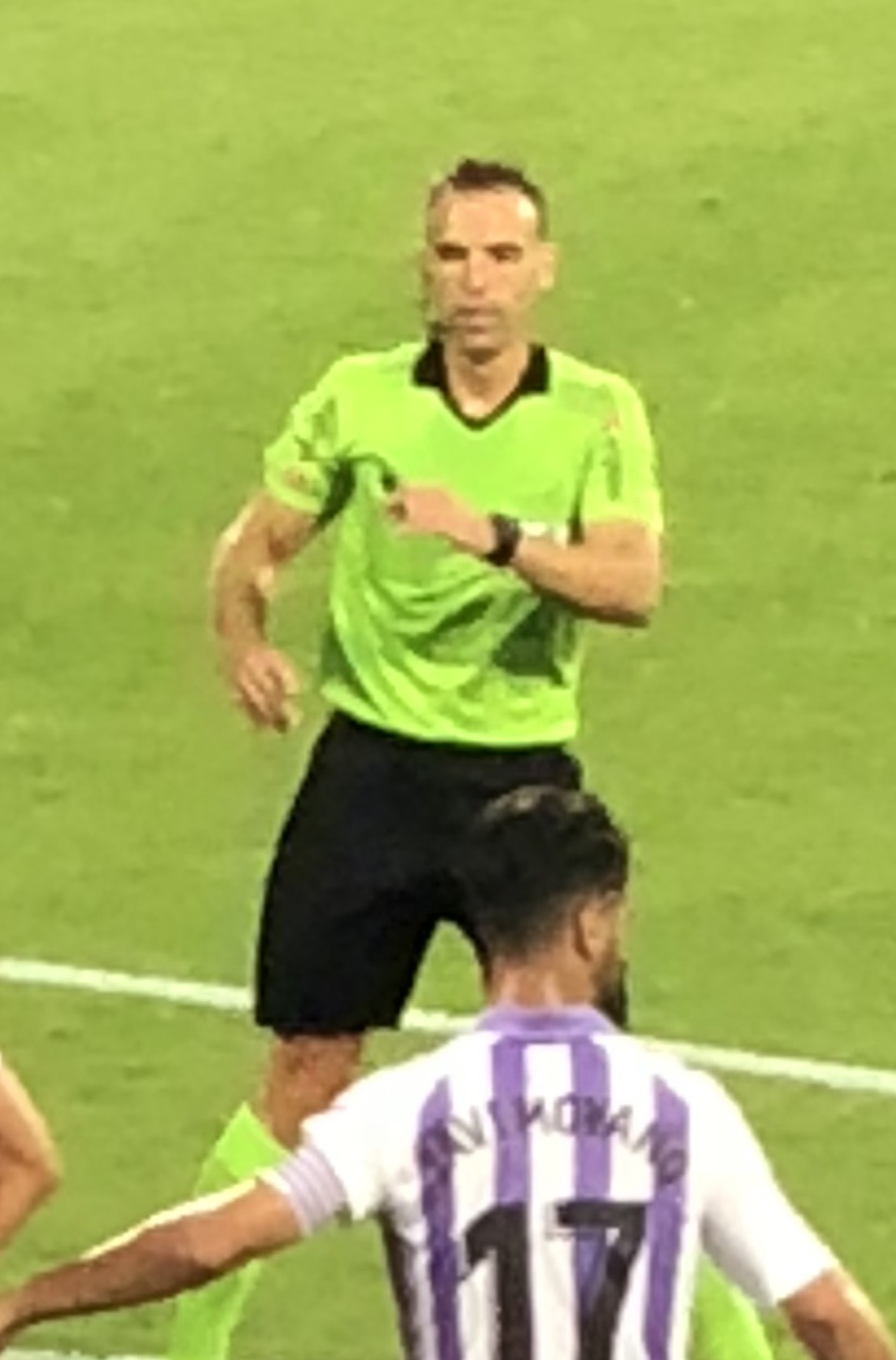
- Cuadra Fernández in 2018
- Full name: Guillermo Cuadra Fernández
- Born: 25 April 1984 (age 42); Madrid, Spain
- Other occupation: Teacher

Domestic
Years	League	Role
2013–2015	Segunda División B	Referee
2015–2018	Segunda División	Referee
2018–	La Liga	Referee

International
Years	League	Role
2020–	FIFA listed	Referee

Guillermo Cuadra Fernández (born 25 April 1984) is a Spanish football referee who officiates in La Liga. He has been a FIFA referee since 2020, and is ranked as a UEFA second category referee.

== Refereeing career ==
Cuadra Fernández began officiating in the Segunda División B in 2013, the Segunda División in 2015 and La Liga in 2018. His first La Liga match as referee was on 17 August 2018 between Girona and Valladolid. In 2020, he was put on the FIFA referees list. He officiated his first UEFA club competition match on 17 September 2020, a meeting between Swedish club IFK Göteborg and Danish club Copenhagen in the 2020–21 UEFA Europa League second qualifying round.

In 2021, Cuadra Fernández was selected as a referee for the 2021 UEFA European Under-21 Championship in Hungary and Slovenia, replacing fellow countryman Ricardo de Burgos Bengoetxea, who tested positive for COVID-19. On 23 April 2021, he was selected by FIFA as a video assistant referee for the football tournaments at the 2020 Summer Olympics in Japan.

== Personal life ==
Cuadra Fernández is a native of Madrid, and also worked as a teacher of English and physical education.
