= Bicas =

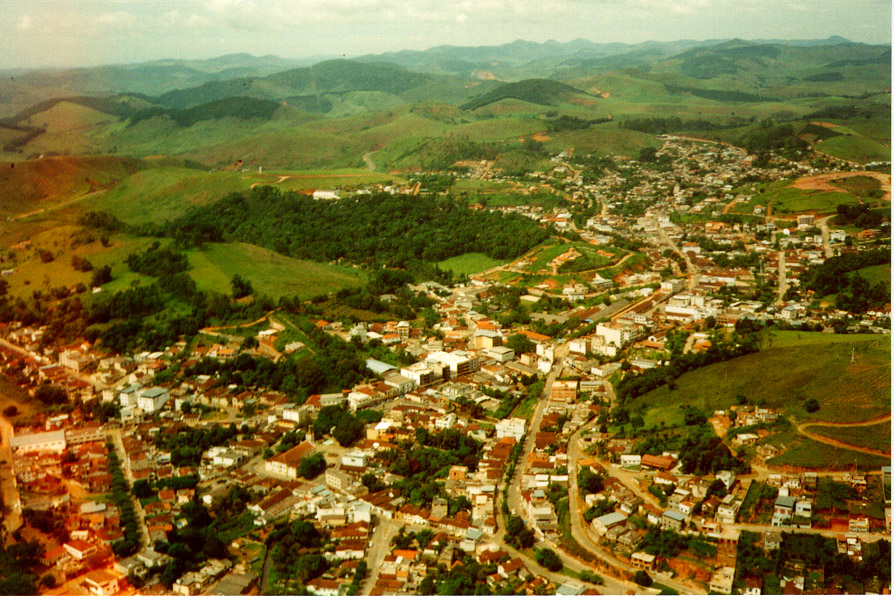
- View of Bicas

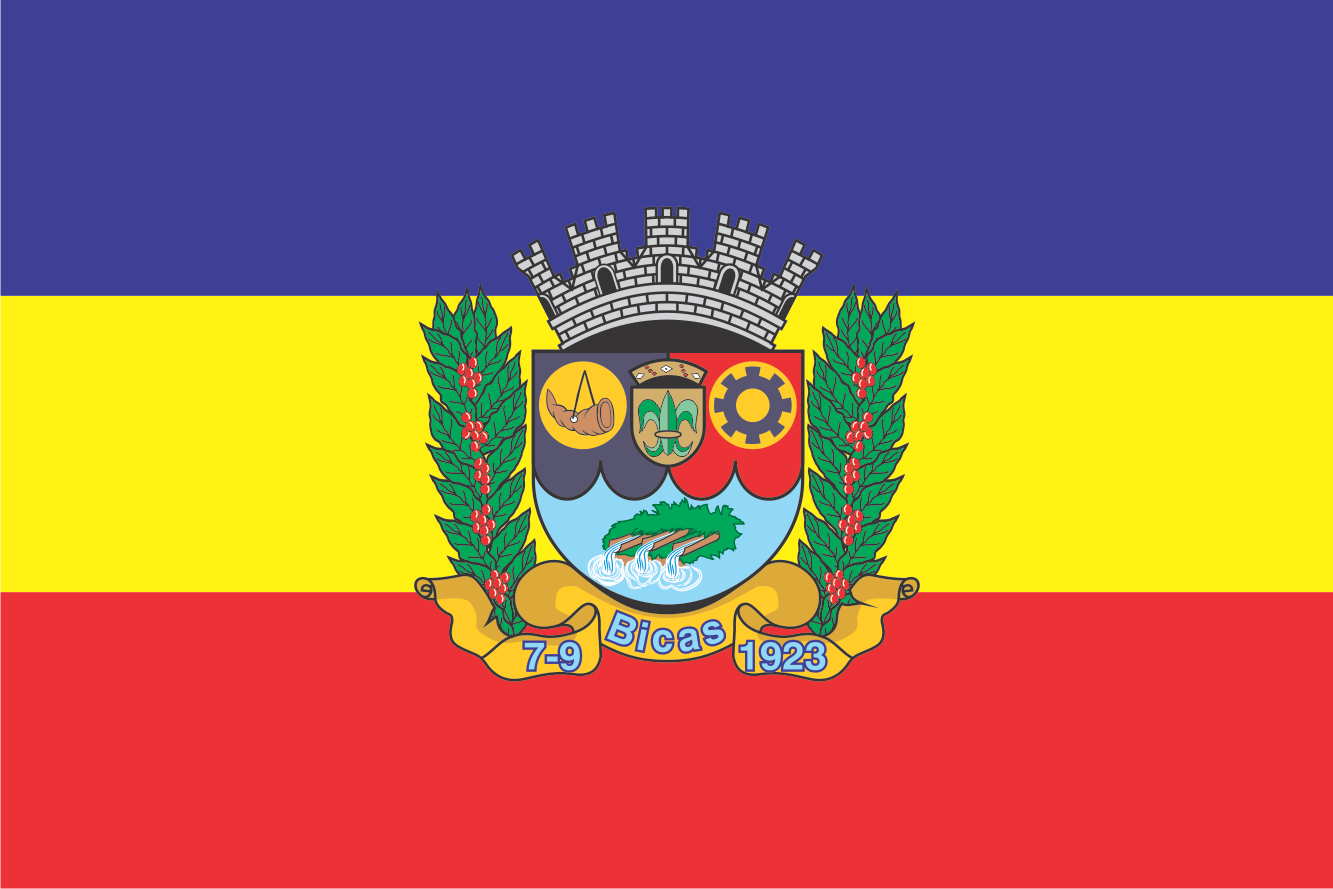
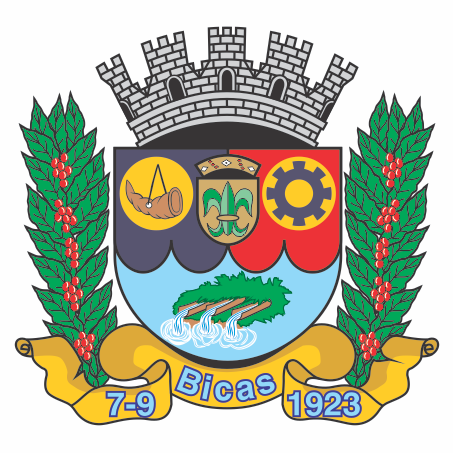
- Flag Coat of arms

- Location in Brazil

- Location within Brazil
- Coordinates: 21°43′30″S 43°03′32″W
- Country: Brazil
- Region: Southeast
- State: Minas Gerais
- Mesoregion: Zona da Mata
- Microregion: Juiz de Fora
- Founded: September 7th, 1923

Government
  - Mayor: Geraldo Magela Longo dos Santos

Area
  - Total: 139,538 km^{2} (53,876 sq mi)
- Elevation: 600.0 m (1,968.5 ft)

Population (2020)
  - Total: 14,554
- Time zone: UTC−3 (BRT)
- HDI (2000): 0.799
- Website: Bicas, Minas Gerais

Bicas is a Brazilian municipality in the state of Minas Gerais. As of 2020 its population is estimated to be 14,554 inhabitants.

== History ==
Originally, a stopping point for salesmen in the 18th century, Bicas gained its independence from the city of Guarará in 1923. It served as a destination for Italian immigrants and other nationalities.

Until the 1970s, Bicas had a full-working train station and an active RFFSA (the extinct state railroad company) branch for repairing wagons. The entire structure was dismantled and today the train station exists only as a historic site. Currently, Bicas has an economy based on commerce, agriculture and farming.

Annual Farming Expositions, with bull-riding and rodeos, cattle commerce and local products - typically in the last week of July of every year - are a tradition of several cities in Zona da Mata, and the Farming Exposition of Bicas is one of the most famous, attracting thousands of tourists from several parts of the country.

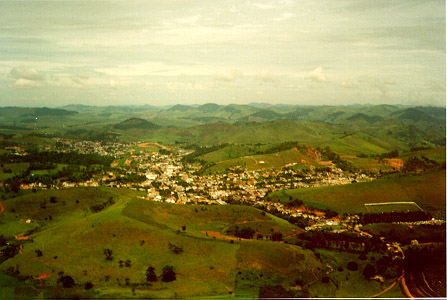
Aerial view of Bicas, in 1995, towards west, showing the city centre and Cruzeiro hill (in the middle), the region of the farming exposition (on the right side) and the highlands (on the left side). Bicas, like many other cities in Zona da Mata region of Minas Gerais state, is surrounded by the typical local geographical relief known as "sea of hills".

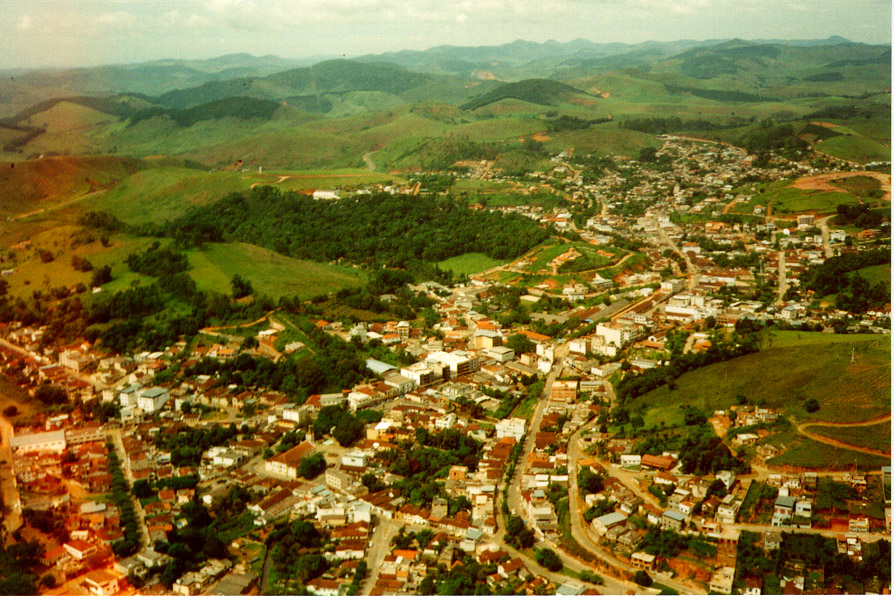
Magnified aerial view of the centre of Bicas, in 1995, towards west, showing with details the city centre (in the middle), where it is possible to observe the central square with the main church. The Cruzeiro hill can be seen on the right side, and above the highlands of the city. It is possible to see, in this picture, the RFFSA's local branch's headquarters. In the top of the picture, parts of the road BR-267 can be seen (linking to neighbour cities like Juiz de Fora, Guarará, Maripá, Mar de Espanha and Pequeri (this last two after routing through the road MG-126)). Again, the "sea of hills" geographical relief surrounding the city is quite noticeable.

== Notable people ==
- Danilo Football player

== Aerial photos ==
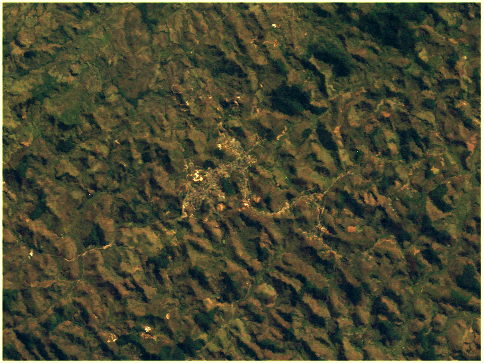
Satellite photo, 1993-06-24, real colour.

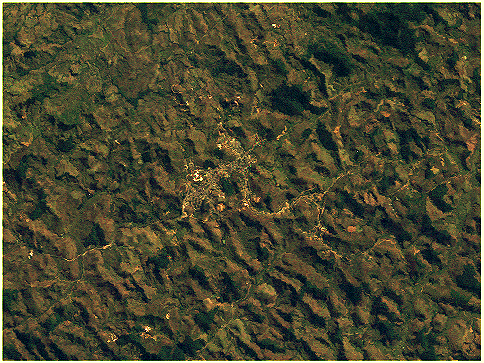
Satellite photo, 1993-06-24, real colour, sharpened to show smaller roads and details.

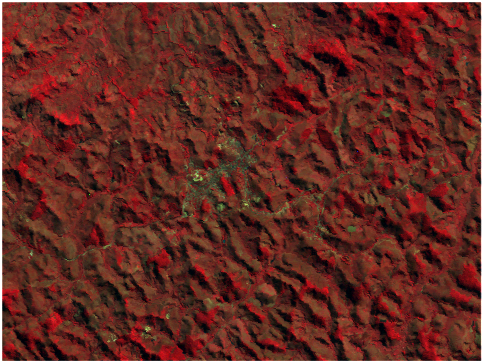
Satellite photo, 1993-06-24, highlighting dense wood covering (bright red), grass (brown) and buildings (green)

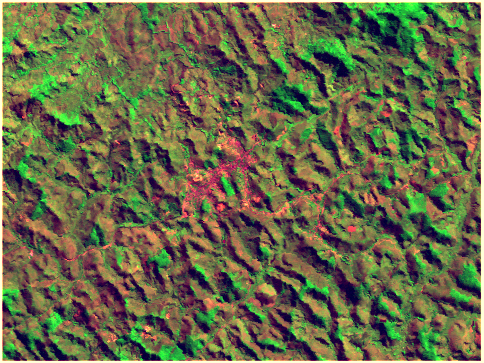
Satellite photo, 1993-06-24, strongly contrasting dense wood covering (green), grass (brown), buildings (purple) and naked land areas (orange)

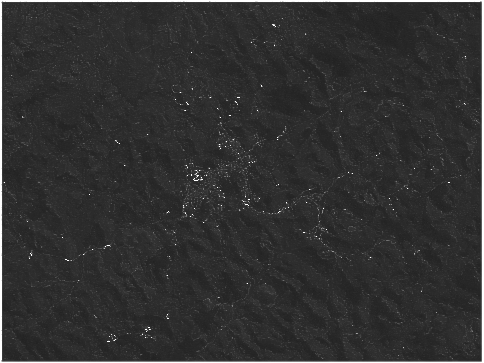
Satellite photo, 1993-06-24, showing buildings and roads (light grey)

== See also ==
- List of municipalities in Minas Gerais
