= List of town tramway systems in Brazil =

This is a list of town tramway systems in Brazil by Estado. It includes all tram systems, past and present.

== Alagoas ==
Location	Article	Gauge (mm)	Traction Type	Date (from) (year-month-day)	Date (to) (year-month-day)	Notes
Maceió			Steam	1868-03-23	?	
Maceió			Horse	1871-12-25	?	
Maceió			electric	1914-June-12	1956 ca.	
Penedo			Horse	1909-01-01	1936-12-31	

== Amazonas ==
Location	Article	Gauge (mm)	Traction Type	Date (from) (year-month-day)	Date (to) (year-month-day)	Notes
Manaus			Steam	1895 ca.	1898 ca.	,
Manaus			electric	1899-Aug-01	1957-02-28	, Operation suspended 1954 - 1956.

== Bahia ==
Location	Article	Gauge (mm)	Traction Type	Date (from) (year-month-day)	Date (to) (year-month-day)	Notes
Alagoinhas			Horse	?	?	
Cachoeira			Horse	1872-10-30	1921	
Ilhéus			Horse	?	?	
Nazaré			Horse	?	?	
Nazaré			Steam	?	?	
Salvador			Horse	1860	?	,
Salvador			Steam	1869-May-12	?	,
Salvador			electric	1897-03-14	1961-Sep	, ,
Santo Amaro			Horse	1874-01-01	1962	

== Ceará ==
Location	Article	Gauge (mm)	Traction Type	Date (from) (year-month-day)	Date (to) (year-month-day)	Notes
Fortaleza			Horse	1880-04-25 (or ca. 1875)	?	
Fortaleza			electric	1913-Oct-09	1947-05-19	
Sobral			Horse	1894	1918	

- Aracati - Horse traction (?). Morrison (1989, page 43) states that an 1873 brochure issued by the Brazilian government mentions a tramway project in this town; it is not known whether the tramway was built.

== Espírito Santo ==
Location	Article	Gauge (mm)	Traction Type	Date (from) (year-month-day)	Date (to) (year-month-day)	Notes
Cachoeiro de Itapemirim			electric	1924-12-25	1938-June-04	
Vila Velha		1000	electric	1912-Apr-12	1967-12-15	, Connected Paul (ferry terminal for Vitória) and Vila Velha.
Vitória			Horse	1907-July-11	1913 by	,
Vitória			electric	1911-07-21	1963-05-23	,

== Goiás ==
Location	Article	Gauge (mm)	Traction Type	Date (from) (year-month-day)	Date (to) (year-month-day)	Notes
Goiás			Horse	?	?	

== Maranhão ==
Location	Article	Gauge (mm)	Traction Type	Date (from) (year-month-day)	Date (to) (year-month-day)	Notes
Caxias			Horse	?	?	
Dom Pedro			Horse	?	?	
São Luís			Horse	1872 ca.	?	
São Luís			electric	1924-09-15	1966-Dec	
♦ Tirirical			electric	1978-10-26	1983	

== Mato Grosso ==
Location	Article	Gauge (mm)	Traction Type	Date (from) (year-month-day)	Date (to) (year-month-day)	Notes
Cuiabá			Mule	1891-04-30	1935	
Cuiabá			electric	2014		

== Minas Gerais ==
Location	Article	Gauge (mm)	Traction Type	Date (from) (year-month-day)	Date (to) (year-month-day)	Notes
Além Paraíba		1000	Mule	1895	1925 (?)	
Além Paraíba		1000	electric	1925-11-15	1939-07-25	Closed following an accident.
Belo Horizonte			Steam	1895-Sep-07	?	,
Belo Horizonte			Horse	1899-02-16	?	,
Belo Horizonte			electric	1902-Sep-02	1963-06-30	,
Bom Sucesso		1000	electric	1930-09-21	1950 (?)	
Campanha			Mule	1911	?	
Campanha			Steam	1911 (?)	?	
Campanha			Petrol (gasoline) (?)			
Campanha			electric (?)			see note.
Cataguases			Horse	1910-11-25; 1915-Aug-10	1914; 1918-03-24	
Caxambu		750	Horse	1911	1925	
Guarará			Mule	1895	1923	
Juiz de Fora		1000	Horse	1889-Sep-07	?	
Juiz de Fora		1000	electric	1906-June-06	1969-04-14	
Lavras		1000	electric	1911-10-21	1967-Noc-08	
Mar de Espanha			Horse (?)			see note.
Nova Lima - Rapopos		660	electric	1913-Apr-03	1970 ca.	
Ouro Preto			Mule	1888-Dec-01	1891 ca.	
Pedro Leopoldo		1000	Mule	1907	1930	
Sacramento - Cipó		1000	electric	1913-11-15	1937-Oct	
São Lourenço			Horse	1905	1932	
Telófilo Otoni			Horse	1918-Sep	1938-May	
Ubá			Mule	1895	1922	

- Note for Campanha: Morrison (1989, page 87) describes conflicting information on whether the tramway was electrified, and when it closed.
- Note for Mar de Espanha: Morrison (1989, page 79) states that one source (dated 1889) mentions a tramway in this town, but no other information could be located.

== Pará ==
Location	Article	Gauge (mm)	Traction Type	Date (from) (year-month-day)	Date (to) (year-month-day)	Notes
Belém			Steam	1869-Sep-01	?	,
Belém			Mule	1870	1908-07-21	,
Belém			electric	1907-08-15	1947-04-27	, Heritage tramway opened 18 August 2005 .
Mosqueiro			Horse	1913 ca. (?)	?	
San Antônio do Prata			Horse	1907	1914	Replaced by railway branch line.

== Paraíba ==
Location	Article	Gauge (mm)	Traction Type	Date (from) (year-month-day)	Date (to) (year-month-day)	Notes
Itabaiana			Horse	1914	1929	
João Pessoa			Horse	1896-June-06	?	
João Pessoa			Steam	1906-10-21	1919	
João Pessoa			Petrol (gasoline)	1911-02-15	1919	
João Pessoa			electric	1914-02-19	1958	

== Paraná ==
Location	Article	Gauge (mm)	Traction Type	Date (from) (year-month-day)	Date (to) (year-month-day)	Notes
Curitiba			Mule	1887-Nov-08	1913	,
Curitiba			electric	1913-Jan-07	1952-Jun	,
Paranaguá			Steam	1893-Dec-07	1938	
Paranaguá			Mule	?	1938	
Paranaguá			Petrol (gasoline)	?	1938	

== Pernambuco ==
Location	Article	Gauge (mm)	Traction Type	Date (from) (year-month-day)	Date (to) (year-month-day)	Notes
Afogados da Ingazeira			Horse	1895	1914 ca.	
Arcoverde			Horse	?	?	See Carpina (below).
Carpina			Horse	?	?	Morrison (1989, page 55) cites a Recife historian who states that this town had a tramway.
Caruaru			Horse	?	?	See Carpina (above).
Limoeiro			Horse	?	?	
Limoeiro			Petrol (gasoline)	?	1952	
Palmares			Horse	?	?	See Carpina (above).
Pesqueira			Horse	191_	193_	
Recife			Steam	1867-Jan-05	1922	,
Recife			Mule	1871-09-22	?	,
Recife			electric	1914-05-13	1954-Mar	, Service (one daily return trip, worked by a single car) resumed because of court action by the local authority, and continued to 1960.
Timbaúba			Horse	1915-10-10	193_	
Triunfo			Horse	?	?	See Carpina (above).

- Garanhuns - Diesel traction . Test operations conducted with a former Recife tramcar, equipped with a diesel engine, in 1968 over a (then recently closed) railway branch. The engine, overloaded by large numbers of passengers seeking a ride on opening day, failed. Public service was not attempted thereafter.
- Goiana - Horse traction (?). Morrison (1989, page 55) states that an 1873 brochure issued by the Brazilian government mentions a tramway project in this town; it is not known whether the tramway was built.

== Piauí ==
Location	Article	Gauge (mm)	Traction Type	Date (from) (year-month-day)	Date (to) (year-month-day)	Notes
Parnaíba			Horse	?	?	
Teresina			Horse	?	?	

== Rio de Janeiro ==
Location	Article	Gauge (mm)	Traction Type	Date (from) (year-month-day)	Date (to) (year-month-day)	Notes
Barra do Piraí			Mule	?	?	
Campos (dos Goytacazes)		1000	Mule	1875-09-19	1916	
Campos (dos Goytacazes)		1000	electric	1916-10-14; 1923	1918-09-15; 1964-11-15	
Campos (dos Goytacazes)			Petrol (gasoline)	1918	1923	
Macaé		1000	Mule	1872-06-29	1932	
Magé			Horse	1873-Feb-04	1896-Nov-01	Temporary operation on planned railway route.
Manuel Duarte			Horse	1883	1911	Connected Paraibuna and Manuel Duarte. Replaced by railway line.
Mendes			Mule	1889	1912 ca.	See note.
Nova Friburgo		1100	Mule	1883	1933	
Petrópolis		1000	electric	1912-12-13	1939-07-15	
Riberão das Lajes			Petrol (gasoline)	1906	1935	Operated over former dam-construction railway from Nicanor Pereira.
(São Sebastião do) Rio de Janeiro	VLT (Rio de Janeiro)		Horse	1859-01-31; 1868-Oct-09	1862-Sep; 1910-03-26	
(São Sebastião do) Rio de Janeiro	VLT (Rio de Janeiro)		Steam	1862-Sep; 1882	1866-11-28 ?	
(São Sebastião do) Rio de Janeiro	VLT (Rio de Janeiro)		electric	1892-Oct-08	1967-12-21	
(São Sebastião do) Rio de Janeiro	VLT (Rio de Janeiro)	1435	electric	2016-Jun-06		
♦ Madureira			Horse	1911-09-28	1928	
♦ Madureira			electric	1928-Oct-12	?	
♦ Santa Teresa	Santa Teresa Tram		Horse	1875-05-25	1897-Jun	, http://www.tramz.com/br/rj/st/st.html ,
♦ Santa Teresa	Santa Teresa Tram	1100	electric	1896-Sep-01		
♦ Campo Grande			electric	1917-05-17	1967-10-31	
♦ Ilha do Governador			electric	1922-Oct-04	1965-Apr-10	
♦ Santa Cruz		820	Horse	1880	1911	
♦ Niterói			Horse	1871-Oct-09	1908-08-15	
♦ Niterói			Accumulator (storage battery)	1883-Oct-07	1885-Feb (after)	
♦ Niterói			electric	1906-10-31	1964-07-31	
♦♦ São Gonçalo			Steam	1899-Aug-05	1917-Feb	Connected Niterói (Neves) and Alcântara.
♦♦ São Gonçalo			Petrol (gasoline)	1917-02-15	1925-Jul	Connected Niterói (Neves) and Alcântara.
♦♦ São Gonçalo			electric	1910-08-25	1964-07-31	Connected Niterói and Alcântara. See note.
Teresópolis			Horse	?	?	
Vassouras			Mule	1883-July-11	1914	

- Barra do Piraí - Peschkes (Part 1, 1980, page 45) lists a tramway (using animal traction) in this town. Morrison (1989, page 120) states that an 1888 government report describes three concessions for tramway construction, and a 1922 publication includes two photographs showing track and overhead wire in streets. However, he adds that a visit to the city "failed to produce any information about the existence of a passenger tramway."
- Note for Mendes: Tramway extended from Humberto Antunes railway station. Electric traction (for goods) and petrol traction (for passengers), ca. 1912 - 1952. Unconnected line extended from Mendes railway station, horse traction, 1900 - 1932.
- Note for Niterói: Niterói tramway undertaking extended to São Gonçalo from 25 August 1910 (electric traction). São Gonçalo tramway absorbed by Niterói undertaking from 1921.
- Notes for Rio de Janeiro: Period of no tramway operation following closure of the first line (to Tijuca, in 1866) and opening of the second line (to Largo do Machado) on 9 October 1868 (later extended to Jardim Botânico). Tijuca line reopened (by a new undertaking) on 19 January 1870. First tramway line in Zona Norte opened 29 November 1873.
  - Experiments with accumulator (storage battery) traction on 2 July 1887 and 16 July 1887.
  - Electric traction inaugurated in Zona Sul on 8 October 1892, and in Zona Norte on 1 July 1905. Last line in Zona Norte closed 21 May 1963. Only one line (in Zona Sul) remained in operation after 17 May 1965.
  - Alto da Boa Vista line retained as tourist line, but operation suspended because of storm damage 10 January 1966 – May 1966. Operation again suspended because of storm damage, 22 January 1967 – Mar 1967. Following a period of intermittent operation, the line was declared closed on 21 December 1967.
- Note for Santa Cruz: Connected Santa Cruz and Itaguaí (1880 - 1907, replaced by railway branch), and Santa Cruz and Sepetiba (27 June 1884 - 1911).

== Rio Grande do Norte ==
Location	Article	Gauge (mm)	Traction Type	Date (from) (year-month-day)	Date (to) (year-month-day)	Notes
Macau			Horse	?	?	
Mossoró			Horse	?	?	
Mossoró			Steam	?	?	
Natal			Horse	1908-Sep-07	?	
Natal			electric	1911-Oct-02	1955-May	

== Rio Grande do Sul ==
Location	Article	Gauge (mm)	Traction Type	Date (from) (year-month-day)	Date (to) (year-month-day)	Notes
Bagé			Horse (?)	?	?	
Cassino			Horse (?)	?	?	
Passo Fundo			Horse	?	?	
Pelotas		1435	Horse	1873-09-09	1915 ca.	
Pelotas		1435	electric	1915-10-20	1955-Apr	
Porto Alegre			Mule	1864-Nov-01; 1873-Jan-04	1872; 1914	,
Porto Alegre			electric	1908-Mar-10	1970-Mar-08	,
Rio Grande		1000	Mule	1876-July-05	1912 ca.	
Rio Grande		1000	electric	1911-11-15	1967-06-15	
Santa Maria			Horse	?	?	
São Leopoldo		1000	Horse	1914-11-29	1915	
Uruguaiana			Horse (?)	?	?	

== Santa Catarina ==
Location	Article	Gauge (mm)	Traction Type	Date (from) (year-month-day)	Date (to) (year-month-day)	Notes
Florianópolis			Mule	1880-Nov-06; 1909-June-05	1885; 193_	
Joinville			Mule	1911-01-29	1917-Apr-10	

== São Paulo ==
Location	Article	Gauge (mm)	Traction Type	Date (from) (year-month-day)	width=80px Date (to) (year-month-day)	Notes
Campinas			electric	1912-06-24	1968-05-24	
Campinas			electric	1972-Nov-05		Heritage tramway, (operates on Saturdays and Sundays, year round).
♦ Campinas - Joaquím Egido - Souzas - Cabras			Steam	1894	1917	
♦ Campinas - Joaquím Egido - Souzas - Cabras			electric	1917-03-18	1960-02-10	
♦ Joaquím Egido - Doutor Lacerda			Petrol (gasoline)	1919	1939-Oct-01	
Campos do Jordão			Petrol (gasoline)	1914-11-15; 1924-12-21	1916; 1956	, ,
Campos do Jordão		1000	electric	1956		, ,
♦ Pindamonhangaba - Campos do Jordão			Petrol (gasoline)	1914-11-15	1916 ca.	, , Goods trains worked by steam. Line not operated between ca. 1916 and 1924.
♦ Pindamonhangaba - Campos do Jordão			electric	1924-12-21		, , Operation suspended 1982 - Oct 1986.
Guaratinguetá			Mule	1898	1920 ca.	
Guaratinguetá			electric	1914-Mar-07	1957 ca.	Line connected Guaratinguetá and Aparecida.
♦ Aparecida			Mule	1895	1913	
♦ Aparecida			electric	1913-Dec-08	1957 ca.	
Jundiaí		600	Mule	1893	1896	
Jundiaí			(electric)			Morrison (1989, page 46) states that an electric tramway project in 1914 was stopped because of the First World War.
Lorena			Mule	1886-10-18	1896	
Piracicaba		1000	electric	1916-01-15	1969-Oct-03	
Piraju		1000	electric	1915-Aug-01	1931 (or 2 August 1937)	Morrison (1989, page 159) , describes conflicting information about the date of closure.
♦ Piraju - Sarutaiá			electric	1915-08-15	1931 (or 2 August 1937)	Morrison (1989, page 159) , describes conflicting information about the date of closure.
Ribeirão Preto			(electric)			Peschkes (Part 1, 1980, page 46) states that the tramway was constructed, but not opened.
Santo André			Horse	?	?	
Santos			Mule	1871-Oct-08	1912-May-03	
Santos			Electric	1909-04-28	1971-02-28	
Santos	Santos heritage tramway		Electric	10 June 1984	October 1986	First heritage tramway
Santos	Santos heritage tramway		Electric	23 Sep 2000		Second heritage tramway
Santos	Baixada Santista Light Rail		Electric	31 Jan 2016		Modern tramway/light rail
♦ São Vicente		1350	Mule	1875-10-24	1909	
♦ São Vicente			electric	1909-04-28	?	Operated as part of Santos system.
♦ Guarujá - Itapema			Steam	1893	1925	
♦ Guarujá - Itapema		1000	electric	1925-Jan-11	1956-07-13	
São Carlos			Horse	1895	1896	, Tramway closed because of yellow fever epidemic.
São Carlos			electric	1914-12-27	1962-06-16	,
São Paulo			Mule	1872-Oct-12	1907	
São Paulo			Steam	1886-03-14	1914	
São Paulo			electric	1900-May-07	1968-03-27	
♦ São Bernardo do Campo		1000	Petrol (gasoline)	1923-May-03	1930-Oct-05	Tramway connected São Bernardo do Campo and São Caetano (do Sul).
♦ Tramway da Cantareira			Steam	?	1965-05-31	See note.
Sorocaba		1000	electric	1915-12-30	1959-02-28	,
♦ Sorocaba - Votorantim			electric	1922-Feb-04	1966	, Public passenger service withdrawn 1966, non-public passenger service withdrawn 1977.
Taubaté		800	Mule	1879-05-27	1910 ca.	
Taubaté		600	Steam	1880	1920	Connected Taubaté and Tremembé.

Non-public tramway:

Location	Article	Gauge (mm)	Traction Type	Date (from) (year-month-day)	Date (to) (year-month-day)	Notes
Vila de Itatinga			Steam	1906	1958	,
Vila de Itatinga		800	electric	1958-Jan	Unknown, c. 2017 or 2016	. Closed as a tramway by 2017, but the tracks remained in use, with intermittent service (for workers) sometimes using the former tramcars being towed by diesel tractors (effectively making the line an ordinary railway, no longer a tramway)

- Note for São Paulo - Tramway da Cantareira: Narrow-gauge light railway. Connected São Paulo, Cantareira, and Guarulhos. Electrification of Guarulhos line planned (ca. 1942, not carried out. Cantareira line closed 1957. Guarulhos line closed 31 May 1965.

== Sergipe ==
Location	Article	Gauge (mm)	Traction Type	Date (from) (year-month-day)	Date (to) (year-month-day)	Notes
Aracaju			Mule	1908-10-24	?	
Aracaju			electric	1926-June-02	1955	

== See also ==
- List of trolleybus systems in Brazil
- List of town tramway systems
- List of town tramway systems in South America
- List of light-rail transit systems
- List of rapid transit systems
