= 2016–17 Real Madrid CF season =

113th season in existence of Real Madrid CF

Real Madrid
2016–17 season
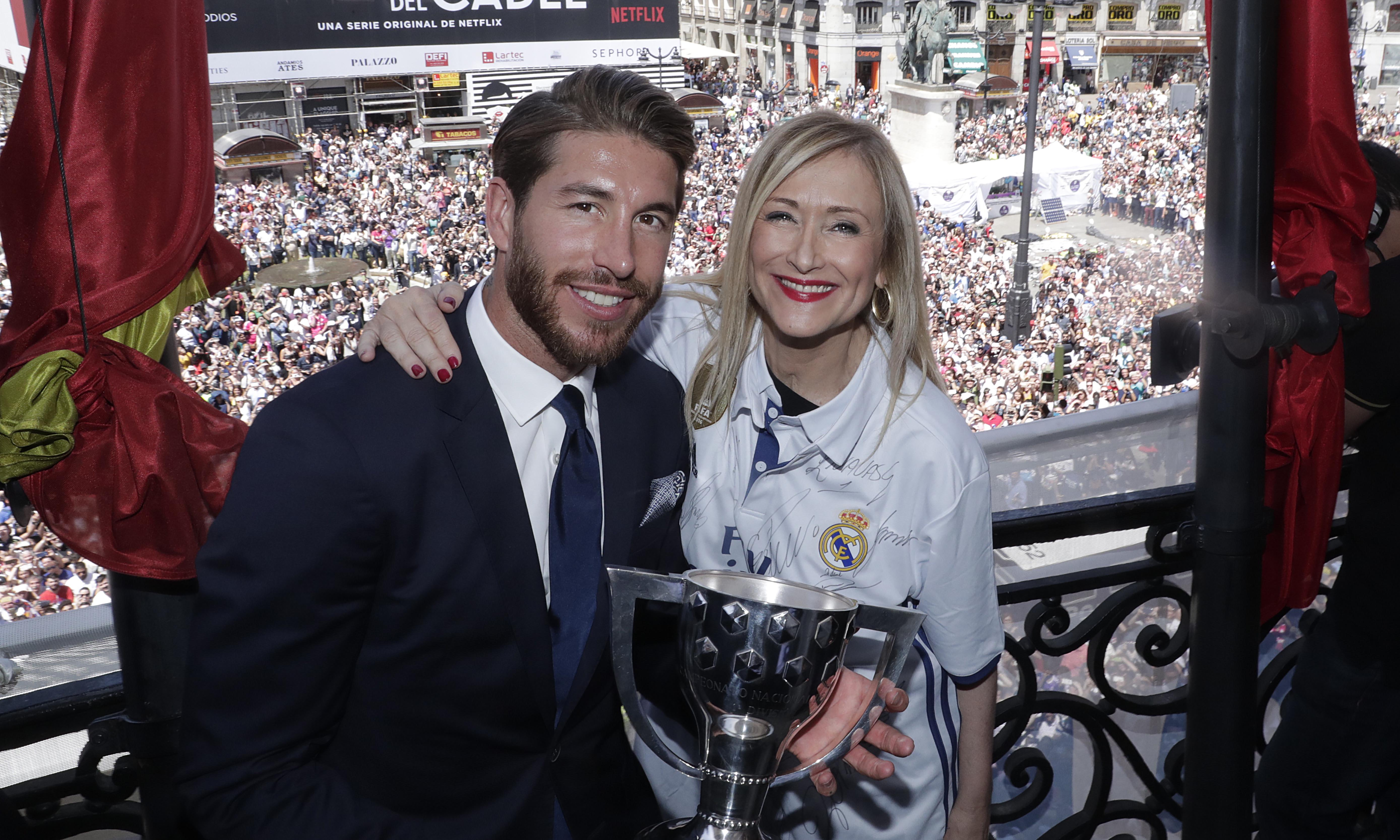
- Sergio Ramos (left) and former President of the Community of Madrid, Cristina Cifuentes (right), with the La Liga trophy
- President: Florentino Pérez
- Head coach: Zinedine Zidane
- Stadium: Santiago Bernabéu
- La Liga: 1st
- Copa del Rey: Quarter-finals
- UEFA Champions League: Winners
- UEFA Super Cup: Winners
- FIFA Club World Cup: Winners
- Top goalscorer: League: Cristiano Ronaldo (25); All: Cristiano Ronaldo (42)
- Highest home attendance: 82,297 vs Barcelona (23 April 2017)
- Lowest home attendance: 59,575 vs Las Palmas (1 March 2017)
- Average home league attendance: 68,562
- Biggest win: Cultural Leonesa 1–7 Real Madrid
- Biggest defeat: Real Madrid 2–3 Barcelona
Home colours	Away colours	Third colours

The 2016–17 season was Real Madrid Club de Fútbol's 113th season in existence and the club's 86th consecutive season in the top flight of Spanish football. It covered a period from 1 July 2016 to 30 June 2017.

The 2016–17 season was one of the most successful campaigns in the history of Real Madrid. The club attained four titles, including a La Liga and Champions League double, a feat only achieved twice before by Real (in 1956–57 and 1957–58).

This season was the first since 2008–09 without Álvaro Arbeloa who had departed to join English club West Ham United F.C. Arbeloa announced that he will not extend his contract for another campaign thus bidding farewell with Los Merengues during the conclusion of the previous season.

== Season overview ==
=== Pre-season ===
On 15 June 2016, Denis Cheryshev was sold to Villarreal. On 21 June 2016, Álvaro Morata re-joined the club under a buy back clause from Juventus for a €30M fee.

=== August ===
On 8 August 2016, Jesé moved to Paris Saint-Germain. On 9 August 2016, Real won the UEFA Super Cup, producing a 3–2 comeback victory against Sevilla after extra time. On 21 August 2016, Madrid started off the league campaign with a 3–0 victory at Real Sociedad with a brace from Gareth Bale and a goal from Marco Asensio. On 27 August 2016, at their home debut of the season, goals from Morata and Toni Kroos gave Madrid a narrow 2–1 victory against Celta Vigo.

=== September ===
On 10 September 2016, Real Madrid started the new month with a 5–2 victory over Osasuna with goals by Cristiano Ronaldo, Danilo, Ramos, Luka Modrić and Pepe. On 14 September 2016, late goals from Ronaldo and Morata got Madrid off to a winning start in the Champions League season against Sporting CP. On 18 September 2016, Real Madrid won 2–0 at Espanyol by goals from James Rodríguez and Karim Benzema. With that win, Real won their 16th straight La Liga game, equalling the record. On 21 September 2016, Madrid drew Villarreal 1–1 at home with a goal from Ramos. On 24 September 2016, Madrid came home with their second straight draw after a 2–2 stalemate at Las Palmas, with goals from Asensio and Benzema. On 27 September 2016, Madrid drew Borussia Dortmund 2–2 in the Champions League, with goals from Ronaldo and Raphaël Varane.

=== October ===
On 2 October 2016, Madrid faced SD Eibar at the Bernabéu, with the match ending in a 1–1 draw. Bale scored for Real, as the team extended their winless streak to four games. On 15 October 2016, Madrid finally snapped that streak, crushing Real Betis 6–1 on the road, thanks to a brace from Isco and goals from Raphaël Varane, Benzema, Marcelo and Ronaldo. On 18 October 2016, Real won 5–1 in the Champions League against Legia Warsaw by goals from Bale, Asensio, Lucas Vázquez, Morata and an own goal. On 23 October 2016, Morata gave Madrid a late 2–1 win against Athletic Bilbao after Benzema scored the opening goal. On 26 October 2016, the cup competition got underway with a 7–1 win over Cultural Leonesa, thanks to braces from Asensio and Morata and goals from Nacho and Mariano. On 29 October 2016, a hat-trick from Ronaldo and a goal from Morata gave Madrid a 4–1 win at Alavés.

=== November ===
On 2 November 2016, Mateo Kovačić gave Madrid the late equalizer in a 3–3 draw at Warsaw, after Bale and Benzema opened a 2–0 lead. On 6 November 2016, a brace from Bale and a goal from Morata helped Madrid to a 3–0 win against Leganés. On 19 November 2016, Real defeated Atlético Madrid 3–0 in the Madrid derby at the Vicente Calderón, thanks to a Ronaldo hat-trick. On 22 November 2016, goals from Varane and Benzema secured Madrid a 2–1 victory at Sporting CP and the qualification to the knockout stage of the Champions League. On 26 November 2016, a brace from Ronaldo gave Madrid a 2–1 home win over Sporting de Gijón. On 30 November 2016, Madrid defeated Cultural Leonesa 6–1 in the second leg of the round of 32 in the Copa del Rey, with a hat-trick from Mariano and goals from Rodríguez, Enzo Fernández and an own goal. Real won 13–2 on aggregate and advanced to the next round.

=== December ===
On 3 December 2016, Madrid drew to Barcelona in the first Clásico of the season, with a late goal from Ramos. On 7 December 2016, a brace from Benzema was not enough in a 2–2 draw against Borussia Dortmund, which resulted in Madrid finishing second in their Champions League group. On 10 December 2016, Madrid needed another late goal from Ramos to win 3–2 against Deportivo La Coruña, after Morata and Mariano scored the other goals. This game set a new record as it was the 35th game for Los Blancos without a loss. On 15 December 2016, Madrid defeated América 2–0 in the semi-final of the Club World Cup with goals from Benzema and Ronaldo. On 18 December 2016, a hat-trick from Ronaldo and a goal from Benzema secured Madrid the Club World Cup title with a 4–2 extra time victory over Kashima Antlers in the final.

=== January ===
On 4 January 2017, the new year started with a 3–0 victory over Sevilla in the first leg of the round of 16 in the Copa del Rey, with a brace from Rodríguez and a goal from Varane. On 7 January 2017, a brace from Isco and goals from Benzema, Ronaldo and Casemiro secured Madrid a 5–0 win against Granada, equaling the Spanish record for an unbeaten run with 39 games, shared with Barcelona. On 12 January 2017, a last minute goal from Benzema secured a 3–3 draw against Sevilla, getting the unbeaten run to 40 games, a new record in Spanish football. The other goals were from Asensio and Ramos. Madrid advanced to the quarter-finals of the Copa del Rey after winning 6–3 on aggregate. On 15 January 2017, in their third meeting against Sevilla in 11 days, Madrid lost 1–2 despite an opening goal from Ronaldo. With that loss, the unbeaten streak ended at 40 matches. On 18 January 2017, Madrid lost their second straight game with a 1–2 defeat at the hands of Celta Vigo in the first leg of the Copa del Rey quarter-finals, despite an equalizer by Marcelo. On 21 January 2017, a Ramos brace in the first half gave Madrid a 2–1 win against Málaga. On 25 January 2017, Madrid were eliminated from the Copa del Rey after a 2–2 draw against Celta Vigo in the second leg of the quarter-finals (4–3 loss on aggregate). Ronaldo and Lucas Vázquez scored the goals, with the former netting a spectacular free kick. On 29 January 2017, goals from Kovačić, Ronaldo and Morata secured Madrid a 3–0 win over Real Sociedad.

=== February ===
On 11 February 2017, the new month was started with a 3–1 away win at Osasuna. Ronaldo, Isco and Vázquez scored the goals. On 15 February 2017, in the first leg of the round of 16 in the Champions League against Napoli, Madrid won 3–1 at home, thanks to goals from Benzema, Kroos and Casemiro. On 18 February 2017, Morata and Bale secured Madrid a 2–0 victory over Espanyol. On 22 February 2017, in a midweek game against Valencia, Real lost 2–1 despite a goal from Ronaldo. On 26 February 2017, being down 0–2, Bale, Ronaldo and Morata scored the goals to complete a comeback, winning 3–2 at Villarreal.

=== March ===
On 1 March 2017, an early Isco goal gave Madrid the lead before they went down 1–3, and Ronaldo scored a late brace to secure a draw for ten-man Madrid against Las Palmas. On 4 March 2017, after a brace from Benzema and goals from Rodríguez and Asensio, Madrid defeated Eibar 4–1. On 7 March 2017, Madrid defeated Napoli 3–1 in the second leg of the Champions League round of 16 with goals from Ramos, Morata and an own goal. Madrid won 6–2 on aggregate. On 12 March 2017, a goal from Ronaldo and Ramos' winning header gave Madrid a 2–1 win over Real Betis. On 18 March 2017, goals from Benzema and Casemiro gave Madrid a 2–1 away win at Athletic Bilbao.

=== April ===
On 2 April 2017, goals from Benzema, Isco and Nacho gave Madrid a winning start into the new month, with a 3–0 victory over Alavés. On 5 April 2017, a hat-trick from Morata and a goal from Rodríguez gave Madrid a 4–2 away win over Leganés. On 8 April 2017, a goal from Pepe was not enough in a 1–1 draw against Atlético Madrid. On 12 April 2017, a Ronaldo brace helped Madrid to secure a 2–1 away win over Bayern Munich in the first leg of the Champions League quarter-finals. On 15 April 2017, Isco scored a brace with a late winner to complete a 3–2 comeback win for Madrid against Gijón, after Morata scored the other goal. On 18 April 2017, Madrid went through to the Champions League semi-finals after defeating Bayern 4–2 after an extra time comeback (6–3 on aggregate) at the Bernabéu thanks to a Ronaldo hat-trick and a goal from Asensio. On 23 April 2017, despite goals from Casemiro and Rodríguez, Madrid came up short with a late 2–3 defeat to Barcelona in the second Clásico of the season. On 26 April 2017, Madrid came back with a 6–2 away victory over Deportivo La Coruña, thanks to a brace from Rodríguez and goals from Morata, Vázquez, Isco and Casemiro. On 29 April 2017, a late goal from Marcelo gave Madrid a 2–1 win over Valencia after Ronaldo put Real in the lead.

=== May ===
On 2 May 2017, Ronaldo scored yet another hat-trick and Madrid ran away with a thumping 3–0 victory against Atlético Madrid in the first leg of the Champions League semi-finals. On 6 May 2017, a brace apiece from Morata and Rodríguez against Granada guided Madrid to a 4–0 victory. On 10 May 2017, an Isco goal was enough for Madrid to reach the Champions League final, despite Atlético winning the second leg 2–1, meaning that Real advanced by an aggregate score of 4–2. On 14 May 2017, a Ronaldo brace and goals from Nacho and Kroos secured Real a 4–1 win over Sevilla. On 17 May 2017, two goals from Ronaldo and one from each Benzema and Kroos got Madrid a 4–1 away victory in the rescheduled match at Celta Vigo. That win gave Madrid the lead in the league table, with one game left. On 21 May 2017, a 2–0 win over Málaga, with goals from Ronaldo and Benzema, secured the 33rd league title for the club.

=== June ===
On 3 June 2017, Real Madrid won the 2016–17 UEFA Champions League, defeating Juventus 4–1 in the final, with a brace from Ronaldo and goals from Casemiro and Asensio. Real won their second consecutive, third in four years and twelfth overall title. With that victory, Madrid also became the first team to defend their title in the Champions League era.

== Players ==
N	Pos.	Nat.	Name	Age	EU	Since	App	Goals	Ends	Transfer fee	Notes
1	GK	(Costa Rica)	Keylor Navas	30	EU	2014	97	0	2020	€10M	Second nationality: Spain
2	DF	(Spain)	Dani Carvajal	25	EU	2013	159	4	2020	€6.5M	Originally from youth system
3	DF	(Portugal)	Pepe (2nd VC)	34	EU	2007	334	15	2017	€30M	Second nationality: Brazil
4	DF	(Spain)	Sergio Ramos (captain)	31	EU	2005	522	68	2020	€28M	
5	DF	(France)	Raphaël Varane	24	EU	2011	189	10	2020	€10M	
6	DF	(Spain)	Nacho	27	EU	2012	118	5	2021	Youth system	
7	FW	(Portugal)	Cristiano Ronaldo (3rd VC)	32	EU	2009	394	406	2021	€94M	
8	MF	(Germany)	Toni Kroos	27	EU	2014	149	7	2022	€25M	
9	FW	(France)	Karim Benzema	29	EU	2009	365	180	2019	€35M	Second nationality: Algeria
10	MF	(Colombia)	James Rodríguez	25	Non-EU	2014	111	36	2020	€80M	
11	FW	(Wales)	Gareth Bale	27	EU	2013	150	67	2022	€100M	
12	DF	(Brazil)	Marcelo (VC)	29	EU	2007 (Winter)	408	28	2020	€6.5M	Second nationality: Spain
13	GK	(Spain)	Kiko Casilla	25	EU	2013	103	7	2021	€6M	
14	MF	(Brazil)	Casemiro	25	Non-EU	2013	101	7	2021	€6M	
15	DF	(Portugal)	Fábio Coentrão	29	EU	2011	106	1	2019	€30M	
16	MF	(Croatia)	Mateo Kovačić	23	EU	2015	73	3	2021	€29M	
17	FW	(Spain)	Lucas Vázquez	26	EU	2015	83	8	2021	€1M	
18	FW	(Dominican Republic)	Mariano	23	EU	2016	14	5	2021	€1M	
19	MF	(Croatia)	Luka Modrić	31	EU	2012	215	11	2020	€30M	
20	FW	(Spain)	Marco Asensio	21	EU	2014	38	10	2021	€3.9M	
21	FW	(Spain)	Álvaro Morata	24	EU	2016	95	32	2021	€30M	Originally from youth system
22	MF	(Spain)	Isco	25	EU	2013	191	32	2018	€27M	
23	DF	(Brazil)	Danilo	25	Non-EU	2015	56	4	2021	€31.5M	
25	GK	(Spain)	Rubén Yáñez	23	EU	2015	1	0	2018	Youth system	

- Last updated: 3 June 2017
- Source: realmadrid.com
- Ordered by squad number.

== Transfers ==
=== In ===
No.	Pos.	Nat.	Name	Age	EU	Moving from	Type	Transfer window	Ends	Transfer fee	Source
15	DF	(Portugal)	Fábio Coentrão	28	EU	(France) Monaco	End of loan	Summer	2019	Free	
18	FW	(Dominican Republic)	Mariano	22	EU	R.M. Castilla	Promotion	Summer	2021	Free	
20	FW	(Spain)	Marco Asensio	20	EU	Espanyol	End of loan	Summer	2021	Free	
21	FW	(Spain)	Álvaro Morata	23	EU	(Italy) Juventus	Buy-back clause	Summer	2020	€30M	Real Madrid C.F.
	MF	(Spain)	Burgui	22	EU	Espanyol	End of loan	Summer	2017	Free	
	MF	(Russia)	Denis Cheryshev	25	EU	Valencia	End of loan	Summer	2020	Free	
	DF	(Spain)	Diego Llorente	22	EU	Rayo Vallecano	End of loan	Summer	2020	Free	
	MF	(Spain)	Omar Mascarell	23	EU	Sporting Gijón	End of loan	Summer	2020	Free	
	MF	(Spain)	Álvaro Medrán	22	EU	Getafe	End of loan	Summer	2020	Free	
	CB	(Spain)	Jesús Vallejo	19	EU	Zaragoza	End of loan	Summer	2021	Free	
	MF	(Brazil)	Lucas Silva	23	Non-EU	(France) Marseille	End of loan	Summer	2020	Free	

Total spending: ▼€30M

=== Out ===
No.	Pos.	Nat.	Name	Age	EU	Moving to	Type	Transfer window	Transfer fee	Source
17	DF	(Spain)	Álvaro Arbeloa	33	EU	(England) West Ham United	End of contract	Summer	Free	West Ham United F.C.
20	FW	(Spain)	Jesé	23	EU	(France) Paris Saint-Germain	Transfer	Summer	€25M	Paris Saint-Germain F.C.
	CM	(Spain)	Marcos Llorente	21	EU	Alavés	Loan	Summer	Loan	Deportivo Alavés
	FW	(Spain)	Borja Mayoral	19	EU	(Germany) VfL Wolfsburg	Loan	Summer	Loan	VfL Wolfsburg
	LW	(Spain)	Burgui	22	EU	Sporting Gijón	Loan	Summer	Loan	Sporting de Gijón
	MF	(Russia)	Denis Cheryshev	25	EU	Villarreal (Spain)	Transfer	Summer	€7M	Villarreal CF
	CB	(Spain)	Diego Llorente	22	EU	Málaga	Loan	Summer	Loan	Málaga CF
	MF	(Spain)	Omar Mascarell	23	EU	(Germany) Eintracht Frankfurt	Transfer	Summer	€1M	Eintracht Frankfurt
	MF	(Spain)	Álvaro Medrán	22	EU	Valencia	Transfer	Summer	€1.5M	Valencia CF
	CB	(Spain)	Jesús Vallejo	19	EU	(Germany) Eintracht Frankfurt	Loan	Summer	Loan	Eintracht Frankfurt
	MF	(Brazil)	Lucas Silva	23	Non-EU	(Brazil) Cruzeiro	Loan	Winter	Loan	Cruzeiro Esporte Clube

Total income: ▲€34.5M Net income: ▲€4.5M

== Pre-season and friendlies ==
27 July 2016 1	Real Madrid	1–3	Paris Saint-Germain	Columbus, United States
19:30 UTC−4	Marcelo 44' (pen.)	Report	Ikoné 2'; Thiago Silva (yellow card) 8'; Aurier (yellow card) 14'; Kurzawa (yellow card) 30'; Meunier 35', 40'; Stambouli (yellow card) 78'	Stadium: Ohio Stadium; Attendance: 86,641; Referee: Hilario Grajeda (United States)

30 July 2016 2	Real Madrid	3–2	Chelsea	Ann Arbor, United States
15:00 UTC−4	Marcelo 19', 26'; Mariano 37'; Casemiro (yellow card) 57'; Enzo (yellow card) 78'	Report	Traoré (yellow card) 28'; Pedro (yellow card) 33'; Cahill (yellow card) 42'; Hazard 80', 90+1'	Stadium: Michigan Stadium; Attendance: 105,826; Referee: Younes Marrakchi (United States)

3 August 2016 3	Bayern Munich	0–1	Real Madrid	East Rutherford, United States
19:30 UTC−4	Bernat (yellow card) 34'; Martínez (yellow card) 72'; Vidal (yellow card) 89'	Report	Danilo 79'	Stadium: MetLife Stadium; Attendance: 82,012; Referee: Jaime Herrera (United States)

16 August 2016 4	Real Madrid	5–3	Reims	Madrid, Spain
22:30 (UTC+2)	Nacho 11'; Ramos 40'; Morata 45+1'; Rodríguez 60'; Mariano 80'	Report	Chavarría 8'; Oudin 49'; Kyei 73'	Stadium: Santiago Bernabéu; Referee: Carlos del Cerro Grande

== Competitions ==
Times from 9 August to 29 October 2016 and from 26 March to 21 May 2017 are UTC+2, from 30 October 2016 to 25 March 2017 UTC+1, unless otherwise noted.

=== Overview ===
Competition	First match	Last match	Starting round	Final position	Record							
Competition	First match	Last match	Starting round	Final position	Pld	W	D	L	GF	GA	GD	Win %
La Liga	21 August 2016	21 May 2017	Matchday 1	Winners	38	29	6	3	106	41	+65	76.32
Copa del Rey	26 October 2016	25 January 2017	Round of 32	Quarter-finals	6	3	2	1	22	9	+13	50.00
Champions League	14 September 2016	3 June 2017	Group stage	Winners	13	9	3	1	36	18	+18	69.23
Super Cup	9 August 2016		Final	Winners	1	1	0	0	3	2	+1	100.00
Club World Cup	15 December 2016	18 December 2016	Semi-finals	Winners	2	2	0	0	6	2	+4	100.00
Total					60	44	11	5	173	72	+101	73.33

Source: Competitions

=== La Liga ===
==== League table ====
Pos	Team	Pld	W	D	L	GF	GA	GD	Pts	Qualification or relegation
1	Real Madrid (C)	38	29	6	3	106	41	+65	93	Qualification for the Champions League group stage
2	Barcelona	38	28	6	4	116	37	+79	90	Qualification for the Champions League group stage
3	Atlético Madrid	38	23	9	6	70	27	+43	78	Qualification for the Champions League group stage
4	Sevilla	38	21	9	8	69	49	+20	72	Qualification for the Champions League play-off round
5	Villarreal	38	19	10	9	56	33	+23	67	Qualification for the Europa League group stage (Note: Since the winners of the 2016–17 Copa del Rey, Barcelona, qualified for European competition based on league position, the spot awarded to the cup winners (Europa League group stage) was passed to the sixth-placed team and the spot awarded to the sixth-placed team (Europa League third qualifying round) was passed to the seventh-placed team.)

Source: La Liga, Soccerway
Rules for classification: 1) Points; 2) Head-to-head points; 3) Head-to-head goal difference; 4) Goal difference; 5) Goals scored; 6) Fair-play points; 7) Play-off.
(C) Champions

==== Results summary ====
Overall								Home						Away					
Pld	W	D	L	GF	GA	GD	Pts	W	D	L	GF	GA	GD	W	D	L	GF	GA	GD
38	29	6	3	106	41	+65	93	14	4	1	48	20	+28	15	2	2	58	21	+37

Source: La Liga

==== Results by round ====
Round	1	2	3	4	5	6	7	8	9	10	11	12	13	14	15	16	17	18	19	20	21	22	23	24	25	26	27	28	29	30	31	32	33	34	35	36	37	38
Ground	A	H	H	A	H	A	H	A	H	A	H	A	H	A	H	H	A	H	H	A	H	A	A	H	A	H	A	H	A	H	A	H	A	H	A	H	A	A
Result	W	W	W	W	D	D	D	W	W	W	W	W	W	D	W	W	L	W	W	W	W	L	W	D	W	W	W	W	W	D	W	L	W	W	W	W	W	W
Position	2	3	1	1	1	1	2	2	1	1	1	1	1	1	1	1	1	1	1	1	1	1	1	1	2	2	1	1	1	1	1	1	1	1	1	1	1	1

Source: La Liga
A = Away; H = Home; W = Win; D = Draw; L = Loss

==== Matches ====
21 August 2016 1	Real Sociedad	0–3	Real Madrid	San Sebastián
20:15	Zaldúa (yellow card) 68'; Berchiche (yellow card) 87'	Report	Bale 2', 90+4'; Asensio 40'; Casemiro (yellow card) 50'; Morata (yellow card) 54'; Ramos (yellow card) 87'	Stadium: Anoeta; Attendance: 27,653; Referee: Juan Martínez Munuera

27 August 2016 2	Real Madrid	2–1	Celta Vigo	Madrid
20:15	Morata 60'; Kroos 81'	Report	Mallo (yellow card) 52'; Jonny (yellow card) 55'; Orellana 67'	Stadium: Santiago Bernabéu; Attendance: 61,568; Referee: Ricardo de Burgos Bengoetxea

10 September 2016 3	Real Madrid	5–2	Osasuna	Madrid
16:00	Ronaldo 6'; Danilo 40', (yellow card) 69'; Ramos 45+1', (yellow card) 72'; Pepe 56'; Modrić 62'	Report	Flaño (yellow card) 17'; García (yellow card) 32'; Riera 64'; Tano (yellow card) 75' (yellow-red card) 79'; García 78'	Stadium: Santiago Bernabéu; Attendance: 64,275; Referee: David Fernández Borbalán

18 September 2016 4	Espanyol	0–2	Real Madrid	Cornellà de Llobregat
20:45	Pérez (yellow card) 21'; Duarte (yellow card) 44'; Diop (yellow card) 54'; J. López (yellow card) 64'	Report	Ramos (yellow card) 3'; Rodríguez 45+2'; Benzema 71'; Carvajal (yellow card) 84'	Stadium: RCDE Stadium; Attendance: 29,484; Referee: Alejandro José Hernández Hernández

21 September 2016 5	Real Madrid	1–1	Villarreal	Madrid
20:00	Ramos (yellow card) 45', (goal) 48'; Ronaldo (yellow card) 69'; Kroos (yellow card) 75'; Carvajal (yellow card) 90+4'	Report	Bruno 45+1' (pen.); José Ángel (yellow card) 52'	Stadium: Santiago Bernabéu; Attendance: 64,582; Referee: José Luis González González

24 September 2016 6	Las Palmas	2–2	Real Madrid	Las Palmas
20:45 (19:45 UTC+1)	Mesa (yellow card) 23'; Tana 38', (yellow card) 90+1'; D. García (yellow card) 54'; Araujo 85'	Report	Asensio 33'; Kroos (yellow card) 58'; Benzema 67'; Carvajal (yellow card) 77'	Stadium: Gran Canaria; Attendance: 22,364; Referee: Xavier Estrada Fernández

2 October 2016 7	Real Madrid	1–1	Eibar	Madrid
16:15	Bale 17', (yellow card) 44'; Carvajal (yellow card) 44'; Morata (yellow card) 56'; Kroos (yellow card) 73'	Report	Rico 6', (yellow card) 84'; Escalante (yellow card) 29'; García (yellow card) 48'; Lejeune (yellow card) 57'; Peña (yellow card) 71'	Stadium: Santiago Bernabéu; Attendance: 67,554; Referee: Juan Martínez Munuera

15 October 2016 8	Real Betis	1–6	Real Madrid	Seville
20:45	Pezzella (yellow card) 49'; Cejudo 55', (yellow card) 64'; Zozulya (yellow card) 77'; Petros (yellow card) 90+1'	Report	Varane 4'; Benzema 31'; Marcelo 39'; Isco (yellow card) 43', (goal) 45', 62'; Ronaldo 78'	Stadium: Benito Villamarín; Attendance: 37,209; Referee: Jesús Gil Manzano

23 October 2016 9	Real Madrid	2–1	Athletic Bilbao	Madrid
20:45	Benzema 7'; Morata 83', (yellow card) 87'; Carvajal (yellow card) 90+4'	Report	Sabin 27'; Etxeita (yellow card) 31'; García (yellow card) 55'; Laporte (yellow card) 87'	Stadium: Santiago Bernabéu; Attendance: 72,910; Referee: Ignacio Iglesias Villanueva

29 October 2016 10	Alavés	1–4	Real Madrid	Vitoria-Gasteiz
16:15	Deyverson 7', (yellow card) 16'; Torres (yellow card) 39'; Hernandez (yellow card) 52'; Femenía (yellow card) 80'; Krstičić (yellow card) 86'	Report	Ronaldo 17' (pen.), 33', 88'; Bale (yellow card) 60'; Morata 84'	Stadium: Mendizorrotza; Attendance: 19,840; Referee: José María Sánchez Martínez

6 November 2016 11	Real Madrid	3–0	Leganés	Madrid
12:00	Ronaldo (yellow card) 17'; Bale 38', 45+1'; Kroos (yellow card) 40'; Nacho (yellow card) 41'; Morata 76'	Report	Machís (yellow card) 8'; Insua (yellow card) 42'; Mantovani (yellow card) 61'; Omar (yellow card) 82'; Díaz (yellow card) 90+1'	Stadium: Santiago Bernabéu; Attendance: 70,007; Referee: Antonio Mateu Lahoz

19 November 2016 12	Atlético Madrid	0–3	Real Madrid	Madrid
20:45	Gabi (yellow card) 26'; Koke (yellow card) 63'; Godín (yellow card) 71'; Correa (yellow card) 84'	Report	Ronaldo 23', 71' (pen.), 77', (yellow card) 63'; Vázquez (yellow card) 78'	Stadium: Vicente Calderón; Attendance: 53,741; Referee: David Fernández Borbalán

26 November 2016 13	Real Madrid	2–1	Sporting Gijón	Madrid
16:15	Ronaldo 5' (pen.), 18'; Nacho (yellow card) 77'	Report	Carmona 35', (yellow card) 66'; Amorebieta (yellow card) 40'; Rachid (yellow card) 61'	Stadium: Santiago Bernabéu; Attendance: 67,118; Referee: Alejandro José Hernández Hernández

3 December 2016 14	Barcelona	1–1	Real Madrid	Barcelona
16:15	Neymar (yellow card) 28'; L. Suárez 53', (yellow card) 75'; Busquets (yellow card) 83'; Mascherano (yellow card) 89'	Report	Isco (yellow card) 13'; Carvajal (yellow card) 80'; Ramos 90'	Stadium: Camp Nou; Attendance: 98,485; Referee: Carlos Clos Gomez

10 December 2016 15	Real Madrid	3–2	Deportivo La Coruña	Madrid
20:45	Morata 50', (yellow card) 70'; Mariano 84'; Navas (yellow card) 88'; Ramos (yellow card) 88', (goal) 90+2'	Report	Borges (yellow card) 25'; Babel (yellow card) 45'; Albentosa (yellow card) 59'; Joselu 63', 65'; Sidnei (yellow card) 88'	Stadium: Santiago Bernabéu; Attendance: 67,174; Referee: Santiago Jaime Latre

7 January 2017 17	Real Madrid	5–0	Granada	Madrid
13:00	Isco 12', 31'; Benzema 20'; Ronaldo 27'; Casemiro 58', (yellow card) 71'	Report	Samper (yellow card) 44'; Uche (yellow card) 57'; Gabriel Silva (yellow card) 70'; Tabanou (yellow card) 72'	Stadium: Santiago Bernabéu; Attendance: 67,839; Referee: Iñaki Vicandi Garrido

15 January 2017 18	Sevilla	2–1	Real Madrid	Seville
20:45	Iborra (yellow card) 31'; Nzonzi (yellow card) 42'; Nasri (yellow card) 81'; Ramos 85' (o.g.); Jovetić 90+1'	Report	Ronaldo 67' (pen.); Marcelo (yellow card) 84'	Stadium: Ramón Sánchez Pizjuán; Attendance: 40,386; Referee: Alejandro José Hernández Hernández

21 January 2017 19	Real Madrid	2–1	Málaga	Madrid
16:15	Ramos 35', 43'; Casemiro (yellow card) 37'; Vázquez (yellow card) 85'	Report	Juan Carlos (yellow card) 39'; Juanpi 63'; Camacho (yellow card) 78'; Santos (yellow card) 85'	Stadium: Santiago Bernabéu; Attendance: 68,708; Referee: Jesús Gil Manzano

29 January 2017 20	Real Madrid	3–0	Real Sociedad	Madrid
20:45	Kovačić 38'; Kroos (yellow card) 39'; Ronaldo 51'; Vázquez (yellow card) 77'; Morata 82'	Report	I. Martínez (yellow card) 6' (yellow-red card) 74'; Rodrigues (yellow card) 71'	Stadium: Santiago Bernabéu; Attendance: 62,462; Referee: Mario Melero López

11 February 2017 22	Osasuna	1–3	Real Madrid	Pamplona
20:45	Fluentes (yellow card) 10'; Sergio León 33'; Fausto (yellow card) 37'; Čaušić (yellow card) 90+1'	Report	Ronaldo 24'; Modrić (yellow card) 28'; Rodríguez (yellow card) 61'; Isco 62'; Vázquez 90+3'	Stadium: El Sadar; Attendance: 17,802; Referee: Ignacio Iglesias Villanueva

18 February 2017 23	Real Madrid	2–0	Espanyol	Madrid
16:15	Morata 33'; Kovačić (yellow card) 41'; Isco (yellow card) 48'; Casemiro (yellow card) 82'; Bale 83'	Report	Gerard (yellow card) 28'; Fuego (yellow card) 53'; Diop (yellow card) 68'; Martín (yellow card) 80'	Stadium: Santiago Bernabéu; Attendance: 72,234; Referee: Alberto Undiano Mallenco

22 February 2017 16	Valencia	2–1	Real Madrid	Valencia
18:45	Zaza 4', (yellow card) 19'; Orellana 9'; Munir (yellow card) 43'; Pérez (yellow card) 54'; Mangala (yellow card) 67'; Parejo (yellow card) 90'	Report	Carvajal (yellow card) 29'; Ronaldo 44'; Varane (yellow card) 59'	Stadium: Mestalla; Attendance: 45,833; Referee: Ricardo de Burgos Bengoetxea
Note: The match, originally scheduled for 18 December 2016, was postponed due to Real Madrid's involvement in the 2016 FIFA Club World Cup.

26 February 2017 24	Villarreal	2–3	Real Madrid	Villarreal
20:45	Trigueros 50'; Bakambu 56'; Soldado (yellow card) 73'; Bruno (yellow card) 73'; Álvaro (yellow card) 74'; Mario (yellow card) 90'	Report	Bale 64'; Ramos (yellow card) 73'; Ronaldo 74' (pen.); Morata 83'; Pepe (yellow card) 90+1'	Stadium: La Cerámica; Attendance: 20,878; Referee: Jesús Gil Manzano

1 March 2017 25	Real Madrid	3–3	Las Palmas	Madrid
21:30	Isco 8'; Carvajal (yellow card) 29'; Bale (red card) 47'; Ramos (yellow card) 55'; Morata (yellow card) 70'; Ronaldo (yellow card) 81', (goal) 86' (pen.), 89'	Report	Tana 10'; David Simón (yellow card) 44'; Viera 56' (pen.); Boateng (yellow card) 53', (goal) 59'; Halilović (yellow card) 90+2'	Stadium: Santiago Bernabéu; Attendance: 59,575; Referee: David Fernández Borbalán

4 March 2017 26	Eibar	1–4	Real Madrid	Eibar
16:15	Escalante (yellow card) 32'; Peña 72'	Report	Benzema 14', 25'; Rodríguez 29'; Asensio 60'; Nacho (yellow card) 62'	Stadium: Ipurua; Attendance: 6,694; Referee: José Luis González González

12 March 2017 27	Real Madrid	2–1	Real Betis	Madrid
20:45	Ronaldo 41'; Ramos 81'; Marcelo (yellow card) 87'	Report	Sanabria 24'; Piccini (yellow card) 30' (yellow-red card) 78'	Stadium: Santiago Bernabéu; Attendance: 69,206; Referee: Antonio Mateu Lahoz

18 March 2017 28	Athletic Bilbao	1–2	Real Madrid	Bilbao
16:15	Aduriz (yellow card) 28', (goal) 65'	Report	Benzema 25'; Carvajal (yellow card) 28'; Casemiro (yellow card) 31', (goal) 68'; Kroos (yellow card) 71'; Navas (yellow card) 90+3'	Stadium: San Mamés; Attendance: 49,095; Referee: Santiago Jaime Latre

2 April 2017 29	Real Madrid	3–0	Alavés	Madrid
16:15	Benzema 31'; Isco 85'; Nacho 88'	Report	Ely (yellow card) 17'; García (yellow card) 87'	Stadium: Santiago Bernabéu; Attendance: 69,586; Referee: José María Sánchez Martínez

5 April 2017 30	Leganés	2–4	Real Madrid	Leganés
21:30	Gabriel 32', (yellow card) 57'; Luciano 34'; Bustinza (yellow card) 85'	Report	Rodríguez 15'; Morata 18', 23', 48'; Nacho (yellow card) 90'	Stadium: Butarque; Attendance: 10,599; Referee: Alfonso Álvarez Izquierdo

8 April 2017 31	Real Madrid	1–1	Atlético Madrid	Madrid
16:15	Casemiro (yellow card) 37'; Pepe 52'; Carvajal (yellow card) 88'	Report	Saúl (yellow card) 52'; Godín (yellow card) 60'; Griezmann 85'; Koke (yellow card) 89'	Stadium: Santiago Bernabéu; Attendance: 77,344; Referee: Ricardo de Burgos Bengoetxea

15 April 2017 32	Sporting Gijón	2–3	Real Madrid	Gijón
16:15	Čop 14'; Álvarez (yellow card) 34'; Vesga 50'; Lillo (yellow card) 61'; López (yellow card) 79'; Cases (yellow card) 87'; Afif (yellow card) 90+2'	Report	Isco 17', 90'; Morata 59', (yellow card) 89'	Stadium: El Molinón; Attendance: 22,983; Referee: David Fernández Borbalán

23 April 2017 33	Real Madrid	2–3	Barcelona	Madrid
20:45	Casemiro (yellow card) 12', (goal) 28'; Ramos (red card) 77'; Carvajal (yellow card) 78'; Kovačić (yellow card) 81'; Rodríguez 86'	Report	Messi 33', 90+2', (yellow card) 90+3'; Umtiti (yellow card) 39'; Rakitić 73'	Stadium: Santiago Bernabéu; Attendance: 82,297; Referee: Alejandro José Hernández Hernández

26 April 2017 34	Deportivo La Coruña	2–6	Real Madrid	A Coruña
21:30	Andone 35'; Arribas (yellow card) 67'; Joselu 84', (yellow card) 90+2'; Çolak (yellow card) 90+3'	Report	Morata 1'; Rodríguez 14', 66'; Vázquez 44'; Isco (yellow card) 68', (goal) 77'; Casemiro 87'	Stadium: Riazor; Attendance: 26,788; Referee: José María Sánchez Martínez

29 April 2017 35	Real Madrid	2–1	Valencia	Madrid
16:15	Ronaldo 27'; Casemiro (yellow card) 52'; Morata (yellow card) 77'; Modrić (yellow card) 82'; Marcelo 86'	Report	Parejo (yellow card) 21', (goal) 82'; Lato (yellow card) 25'; Garay (yellow card) 56'; Mangala (yellow card) 64'	Stadium: Santiago Bernabéu; Attendance: 71,784; Referee: Jesús Gil Manzano

6 May 2017 36	Granada	0–4	Real Madrid	Granada
20:45	Ingason (yellow card) 88'	Report	Rodríguez 3', 11'; Morata 30', 35'	Stadium: Nuevo Los Cármenes; Attendance: 19,161; Referee: Ignacio Iglesias Villanueva

14 May 2017 37	Real Madrid	4–1	Sevilla	Madrid
20:00	Nacho 10', (yellow card) 80'; Ronaldo 23', 78'; Danilo (yellow card) 39'; Morata (yellow card) 56'; Vázquez (yellow card) 83'; Kroos 84'	Report	Jovetić 49'; Mercado (yellow card) 69'; Correa (yellow card) 80'	Stadium: Santiago Bernabéu; Attendance: 66,456; Referee: Alberto Undiano Mallenco

17 May 2017 21	Celta Vigo	1–4	Real Madrid	Vigo
21:00	Aspas (yellow card) 38' (yellow-red card) 62'; Jonny (yellow card) 64'; Guidetti (yellow card) 66', (goal) 69'; Mallo (yellow card) 73'; Hernández (yellow card) 85'	Report	Ronaldo 10', 48'; Casemiro (yellow card) 30'; Benzema 70'; Ramos (yellow card) 85'; Kroos 88'	Stadium: Balaídos; Attendance: 22,838; Referee: Juan Martínez Munuera
Note: The match, originally scheduled for 5 February 2017, was postponed due to security concerns after a storm hit Vigo and damaged the roof of the stadium.

21 May 2017 38	Málaga	0–2	Real Madrid	Málaga
20:00	Kameni (yellow card) 56'; Jony (yellow card) 57'	Report	Ronaldo 2'; Benzema 55'	Stadium: La Rosaleda; Attendance: 27,867; Referee: Ricardo de Burgos Bengoetxea

=== Copa del Rey ===
Madrid joined the competition in the round of 32.

==== Round of 32 ====
26 October 2016 First leg	Cultural Leonesa	1–7	Real Madrid	León
21:00	Yeray (yellow card) 36'; Benja 84'	Report	Zuiverloon 6' (o.g.); Asensio 32', 53'; Kroos (yellow card) 36'; Morata 46', 55'; Nacho 68'; Mariano 90+2'	Stadium: Reino de León; Attendance: 11,516; Referee: Daniel Jesús Trujillo Suárez

30 November 2016 Second leg	Real Madrid	6–1 (13–2 agg.)	Cultural Leonesa	Madrid
19:00	Mariano 1', 42', 87'; Rodríguez 23'; Casemiro (yellow card) 31'; Enzo 63'; Morgado 90' (o.g.)	Report	Garrido (yellow card) 32'; Yeray 45'	Stadium: Santiago Bernabéu; Attendance: 47,656; Referee: Mario Melero López

==== Round of 16 ====
4 January 2017 First leg	Real Madrid	3–0	Sevilla	Madrid
21:15	Rodríguez 11', 44' (pen.); Varane 29'; Carvajal (yellow card) 42'; Marcelo (yellow card) 42'	Report	Iborra (yellow card) 24'; Ganso (yellow card) 26'; Mercado (yellow card) 43'; Vitolo (yellow card) 83'	Stadium: Santiago Bernabéu; Attendance: 78,969; Referee: Antonio Mateu Lahoz

12 January 2017 Second leg	Sevilla	3–3 (3–6 agg.)	Real Madrid	Seville
21:15	Mercado (yellow card) 7'; Danilo 10' (o.g.); Jovetić 53', (yellow card) 72'; Iborra (yellow card) 62', (goal) 77'	Report	Vázquez (yellow card) 13'; Asensio 48'; Kovačić (yellow card) 63'; Casilla (yellow card) 72'; Ramos 83' (pen.); Casemiro (yellow card) 84'; Marcelo (yellow card) 88'; Benzema 90+3'	Stadium: Ramón Sánchez Pizjuán; Attendance: 36,943; Referee: Alberto Undiano Mallenco

==== Quarter-finals ====
18 January 2017 First leg	Real Madrid	1–2	Celta Vigo	Madrid
21:15	Ramos (yellow card) 6'; Marcelo 69'	Report	Díaz (yellow card) 42'; Hernández (yellow card) 45'; Aspas 64'; Jonny 70'	Stadium: Santiago Bernabéu; Attendance: 58,196; Referee: David Fernández Borbalán

25 January 2017 Second leg	Celta Vigo	2–2 (4–3 agg.)	Real Madrid	Vigo
21:15	Mallo (yellow card) 35'; Danilo 44' (o.g.); Wass (yellow card) 54', (goal) 85'; Jonny (yellow card) 72'	Report	Ronaldo 62'; Vázquez 90'	Stadium: Balaídos; Attendance: 23,491; Referee: José María Sánchez Martínez

=== UEFA Champions League ===
Madrid joined the competition in the group stage.

==== Group stage ====
Pos	Team	Pld	W	D	L	GF	GA	GD	Pts	Qualification	DOR	RMA	LEG	SPO
1	(Germany) Borussia Dortmund	6	4	2	0	21	9	+12	14	Advance to knockout phase	—	2–2	8–4	1–0
2	(Spain) Real Madrid	6	3	3	0	16	10	+6	12	Advance to knockout phase	2–2	—	5–1	2–1
3	(Poland) Legia Warsaw	6	1	1	4	9	24	−15	4	Transfer to Europa League	0–6	3–3	—	1–0
4	(Portugal) Sporting CP	6	1	0	5	5	8	−3	3		1–2	1–2	2–0	—

Source: UEFA
Rules for classification: Group stage tiebreakers

14 September 2016 1	Real Madrid (Spain)	2–1	(Portugal) Sporting CP	Madrid, Spain
20:45	Kroos (yellow card) 75'; Ronaldo 89'; Morata 90+5'	Report	Silva (yellow card) 39'; Bruno César 47'; Carvalho (yellow card) 57'; Zeegelaar (yellow card) 65'	Stadium: Santiago Bernabéu; Attendance: 72,179; Referee: Paolo Tagliavento (Italy)

27 September 2016 2	Borussia Dortmund (Germany)	2–2	(Spain) Real Madrid	Dortmund, Germany
20:45	Aubameyang 43', (yellow card) 90+3'; Schmelzer (yellow card) 50'; Weigl (yellow card) 74'; Guerreiro (yellow card) 77'; Schürrle 87'	Report	Ronaldo 17'; Ramos (yellow card) 63'; Varane 68'	Stadium: Westfalenstadion; Attendance: 65,849; Referee: Mark Clattenburg (England)

18 October 2016 3	Real Madrid (Spain)	5–1	(Poland) Legia Warsaw	Madrid, Spain
20:45	Bale 16'; Jodłowiec 20' (o.g.); Asensio 37'; Ronaldo (yellow card) 63'; Vázquez 68'; Morata 84'	Report	Radović 22' (pen.), (yellow card) 62'; Moulin (yellow card) 51'	Stadium: Santiago Bernabéu; Attendance: 70,251; Referee: Ruddy Buquet (France)

2 November 2016 4	Legia Warsaw (Poland)	3–3	(Spain) Real Madrid	Warsaw, Poland
20:45	Odjidja-Ofoe 40'; Radović 58'; Moulin 83'	Report	Bale 1'; Benzema 35'; Kovačić 85'	Stadium: Polish Army Stadium; Attendance: 0 (Note: The match was played behind closed doors due to punishment by UEFA.); Referee: Pavel Královec (Czech Republic)

22 November 2016 5	Sporting CP (Portugal)	1–2	(Spain) Real Madrid	Lisbon, Portugal
20:45 (19:45 UTC±0)	Ruiz (yellow card) 57'; J. Pereira (red card) 64'; Silva 80' (pen.); Campbell (yellow card) 90'; André (yellow card) 90+2'	Report	Varane 29'; Marcelo (yellow card) 40'; Kovačić (yellow card) 64'; Benzema 87'	Stadium: Estádio José Alvalade; Attendance: 50,046; Referee: Willie Collum (Scotland)

7 December 2016 6	Real Madrid (Spain)	2–2	(Germany) Borussia Dortmund	Madrid, Spain
20:45	Benzema 28', 53'; Modrić (yellow card) 39'; Casemiro (yellow card) 69'	Report	Aubameyang 60'; Papastathopoulos (yellow card) 71'; Reus 88'	Stadium: Santiago Bernabéu; Attendance: 76,894; Referee: Szymon Marciniak (Poland)

==== Knockout phase ====
===== Round of 16 =====
15 February 2017 First leg	Real Madrid (Spain)	3–1	(Italy) Napoli	Madrid, Spain
20:45	Ramos (yellow card) 17'; Benzema 18'; Kroos 49'; Modrić (yellow card) 52'; Casemiro 54'	Report	Insigne 8'; Zieliński (yellow card) 38'; Mertens (yellow card) 76'	Stadium: Santiago Bernabéu; Attendance: 78,000; Referee: Damir Skomina (Slovenia)

7 March 2017 Second leg	Napoli (Italy)	1–3 (2–6 agg.)	(Spain) Real Madrid	Naples, Italy
20:45	Mertens 24'; Allan (yellow card) 55'; Diawara (yellow card) 89'	Report	Ramos 52'; Mertens 57' (o.g.); Morata 90+1'	Stadium: Stadio San Paolo; Attendance: 56,695; Referee: Cüneyt Çakır (Turkey)

===== Quarter-finals =====
12 April 2017 First leg	Bayern Munich (Germany)	1–2	(Spain) Real Madrid	Munich, Germany
20:45	Vidal 25', (penalty missed) 45+1', (yellow card) 90'; Alonso (yellow card) 47'; Martínez (yellow card) 58' (yellow-red card) 61'	Report	Kroos (yellow card) 44'; Carvajal (yellow card) 45'; Ronaldo 47', 77'	Stadium: Allianz Arena; Attendance: 70,000; Referee: Nicola Rizzoli (Italy)

18 April 2017 Second leg	Real Madrid (Spain)	4–2 (a.e.t.) (6–3 agg.)	(Germany) Bayern Munich	Madrid, Spain
20:45	Casemiro (yellow card) 40'; Ronaldo 76', 105', 110'; Asensio 112'	Report	Vidal (yellow card) 6' (yellow-red card) 84'; Lewandowski 53' (pen.); Alonso (yellow card) 70'; Hummels (yellow card) 75'; Ramos 78' (o.g.); Robben (yellow card) 101'	Stadium: Santiago Bernabéu; Attendance: 78,346; Referee: Viktor Kassai (Hungary)

===== Semi-finals =====
2 May 2017 First leg	Real Madrid (Spain)	3–0	(Spain) Atlético Madrid	Madrid, Spain
20:45	Ronaldo 10', 73', 86'; Isco (yellow card) 48'	Report	Koke (yellow card) 26'; Saúl (yellow card) 53'; Savić (yellow card) 83'	Stadium: Santiago Bernabéu; Attendance: 77,609; Referee: Martin Atkinson (England)

10 May 2017 Second leg	Atlético Madrid (Spain)	2–1 (2–4 agg.)	(Spain) Real Madrid	Madrid, Spain
20:45	Savić (yellow card) 6'; Saúl 12'; Griezmann 16' (pen.); Godín (yellow card) 34'; Gabi (yellow card) 37'; Correa (yellow card) 85'	Report	Danilo (yellow card) 4'; Ramos (yellow card) 34'; Isco 42'	Stadium: Vicente Calderón; Attendance: 53,422; Referee: Cüneyt Çakır (Turkey)

===== Final =====
3 June 2017	Juventus (Italy)	1–4	(Spain) Real Madrid	Cardiff, Wales
20:45 (19:45 UTC+1)	Dybala (yellow card) 12'; Mandžukić 27'; Pjanić (yellow card) 66'; Alex Sandro (yellow card) 70'; Cuadrado (yellow card) 72' (yellow-red card) 84'	Report	Ronaldo 20', 64'; Ramos (yellow card) 31'; Carvajal (yellow card) 42'; Kroos (yellow card) 53'; Casemiro 61'; Asensio 90', (yellow card) 90+1'	Stadium: Millennium Stadium; Attendance: 65,842; Referee: Felix Brych (Germany)

=== UEFA Super Cup ===
Madrid secured their spot by winning the 2015–16 UEFA Champions League.

9 August 2016 Final	Real Madrid (Spain)	3–2 (a.e.t.)	(Spain) Sevilla	Trondheim, Norway
20:45	Asensio 21'; Carvajal (yellow card) 84'; Asensio (yellow card) 86'; Ramos 90+3'; Rodríguez (yellow card) 93'; Carvajal 119'	Report	Vitolo (yellow card) 39'; Vázquez 41'; Konoplyanka 72' (pen.); Kolodziejczak (yellow card) 90' (yellow-red card) 93'	Stadium: Lerkendal Stadion; Attendance: 17,939; Referee: Milorad Mažić (Serbia)

=== FIFA Club World Cup ===
Madrid secured their spot by winning the 2015–16 UEFA Champions League.

15 December 2016 Semi-finals	América (Mexico)	0–2	(Spain) Real Madrid	Yokohama, Japan
19:30 UTC+9	Sambueza (yellow card) 21'	Report	Benzema 45+2'; Nacho (yellow card) 90+1'; Ronaldo 90+3'	Stadium: International Stadium Yokohama; Attendance: 50,117; Referee: Enrique Cáceres (Paraguay)

18 December 2016 Final	Real Madrid (Spain)	4–2 (a.e.t.)	(Japan) Kashima Antlers	Yokohama, Japan
19:30 UTC+9	Benzema 9'; Ramos (yellow card) 55'; Ronaldo 60' (pen.), 98', 104'; Casemiro (yellow card) 100'; Carvajal (yellow card) 102'	Report	Shibasaki 44', 52'; Yamamoto (yellow card) 58'; Fabrício (yellow card) 93'	Stadium: International Stadium Yokohama; Attendance: 68,742; Referee: Janny Sikazwe (Zambia)

== Statistics ==
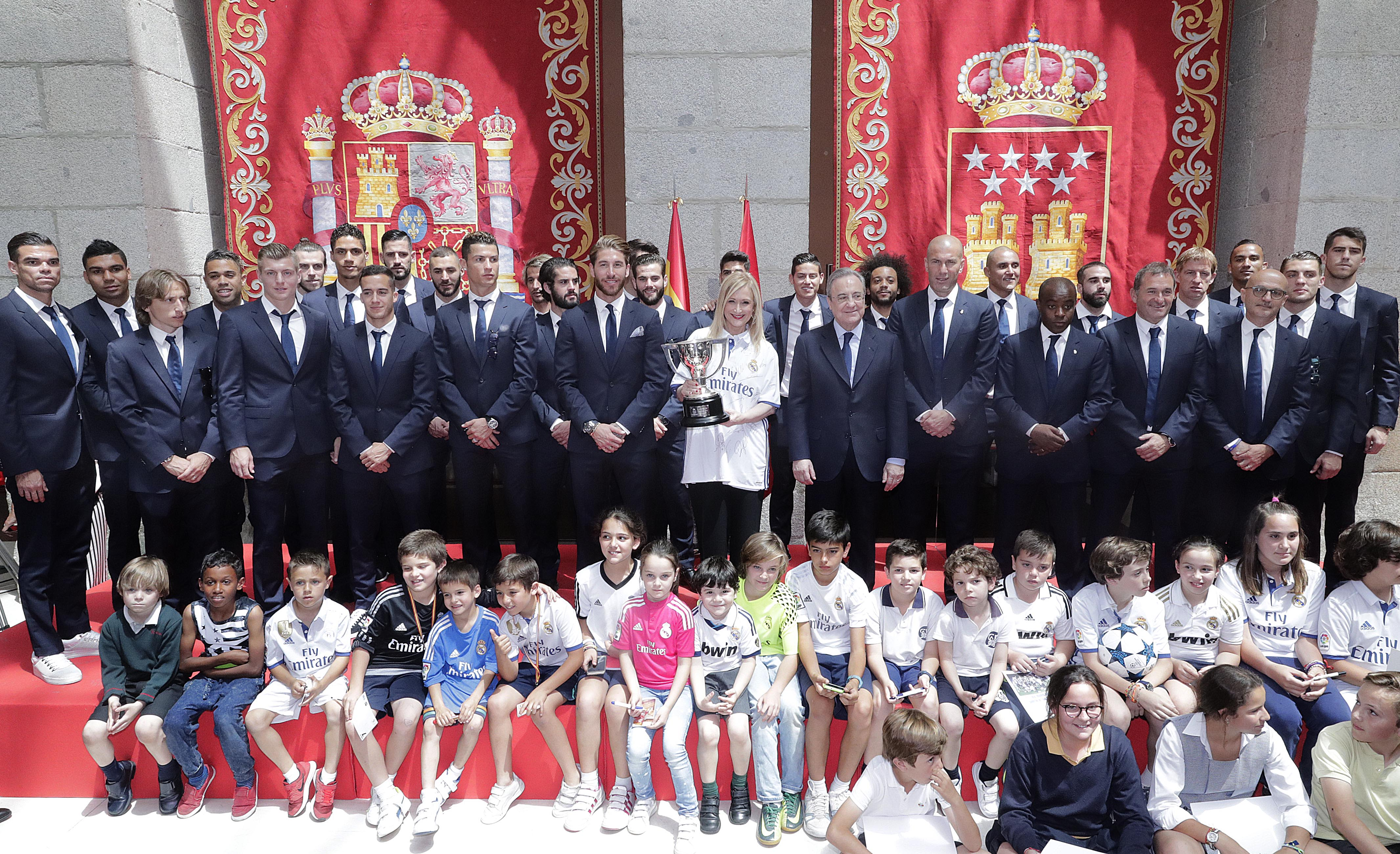
La Liga champions Real Madrid celebrate the title with Community of Madrid President Cristina Cifuentes.

=== Squad statistics ===
No.	Pos	Nat	Player	Total		La Liga		Copa del Rey		Champions League		Super Cup		Club World Cup	
No.	Pos	Nat	Player	Apps	Goals	Apps	Goals	Apps	Goals	Apps	Goals	Apps	Goals	Apps	Goals
1	GK	(Costa Rica)	Keylor Navas	41	0	27	0	0	0	12	0	0	0	2	0
2	DF	(Spain)	Dani Carvajal	41	1	21+2	0	4	0	11	0	1	1	2	0
4	DF	(Spain)	Sergio Ramos	44	10	28	7	3	1	11	1	1	1	1	0
5	DF	(France)	Raphaël Varane	39	4	23	1	3	1	10	2	1	0	2	0
6	DF	(Spain)	Nacho	39	3	24+4	2	5	1	3+1	0	0	0	2	0
12	DF	(Brazil)	Marcelo	47	3	26+4	2	3	1	11	0	1	0	2	0
8	MF	(Germany)	Toni Kroos	48	4	28+1	3	5	0	11+1	1	0	0	2	0
14	MF	(Brazil)	Casemiro	42	6	20+5	4	5	0	9	2	1	0	2	0
19	MF	(Croatia)	Luka Modrić	41	1	22+3	1	2	0	11	0	1	0	2	0
7	FW	(Portugal)	Cristiano Ronaldo	46	42	29	25	2	1	13	12	0	0	2	4
9	FW	(France)	Karim Benzema	48	19	23+6	11	3	1	12+1	5	1	0	2	2
13	GK	(Spain)	Kiko Casilla	19	0	11	0	6	0	1	0	1	0	0	0
16	MF	(Croatia)	Mateo Kovačić	39	2	19+8	1	4	0	2+4	1	1	0	1	0
22	MF	(Spain)	Isco	42	11	18+12	10	4	0	5+1	1	1	0	1	0
11	FW	(Wales)	Gareth Bale	27	9	17+2	7	0	0	7+1	2	0	0	0	0
23	DF	(Brazil)	Danilo	25	1	17	1	5	0	3	0	0	0	0	0
21	FW	(Spain)	Álvaro Morata	43	20	14+12	15	5	2	1+8	3	1	0	2	0
3	DF	(Portugal)	Pepe	18	2	13	2	2	0	2+1	0	0	0	0	0
10	MF	(Colombia)	James Rodríguez	33	11	13+9	8	3	3	4+2	0	1	0	1	0
17	FW	(Spain)	Lucas Vázquez	50	4	12+21	2	4	1	2+8	1	1	0	2	0
20	FW	(Spain)	Marco Asensio	38	10	11+12	3	6	3	1+7	3	1	1	0	0
15	DF	(Portugal)	Fábio Coentrão	6	0	2+1	0	1	0	1+1	0	0	0	0	0
18	FW	(Dominican Republic)	Mariano	14	5	0+8	1	5	4	0+1	0	0	0	0	0
27	DF	(Spain)	Álvaro Tejero	2	0	0+1	0	1	0	0	0	0	0	0	0
25	GK	(Spain)	Rubén Yáñez	1	0	0	0	1	0	0	0	0	0	0	0
26	MF	(Norway)	Martin Ødegaard	1	0	0	0	1	0	0	0	0	0	0	0
29	MF	(France)	Enzo Fernández	1	1	0	0	1	1	0	0	0	0	0	0

=== Goals ===
Rank	Player	Position	La Liga	Copa del Rey	UEFA CL	Other^{1}	Total
1	(Portugal) Cristiano Ronaldo	FW	25	1	12	4	42
2	(Spain) Álvaro Morata	FW	15	2	3	0	20
3	(France) Karim Benzema	FW	11	1	5	2	19
4	(Spain) Isco	MF	10	0	1	0	11
4	(Colombia) James Rodríguez	MF	8	3	0	0	11
6	(Spain) Marco Asensio	FW	3	3	3	1	10
6	(Spain) Sergio Ramos	DF	7	1	1	1	10
8	(Wales) Gareth Bale	FW	7	0	2	0	9
9	(Brazil) Casemiro	MF	4	0	2	0	6
10	(Dominican Republic) Mariano	FW	1	4	0	0	5
11	(Germany) Toni Kroos	MF	3	0	1	0	4
11	(France) Raphaël Varane	DF	1	1	2	0	4
11	(Spain) Lucas Vázquez	FW	2	1	1	0	4
14	(Brazil) Marcelo	DF	2	1	0	0	3
14	(Spain) Nacho	DF	2	1	0	0	3
16	(Croatia) Mateo Kovačić	MF	1	0	1	0	2
16	(Portugal) Pepe	DF	2	0	0	0	2
18	(Spain) Dani Carvajal	DF	0	0	0	1	1
18	(Brazil) Danilo	DF	1	0	0	0	1
18	(France) Enzo	MF	0	1	0	0	1
18	(Croatia) Luka Modrić	MF	1	0	0	0	1
Own goals			0	2	2	0	4
Total			106	22	36	9	173

^{1} Includes 2016 UEFA Super Cup and 2016 FIFA Club World Cup.

=== Clean sheets ===
Rank	Name	La Liga	Copa del Rey	Champions League	Other^{1}	Total
1	(Costa Rica) Keylor Navas	5	0	1	1	7
2	(Spain) Kiko Casilla	5	1	0	0	6
Total		10	1	1	1	13

^{1} Includes 2016 UEFA Super Cup and 2016 FIFA Club World Cup.

=== Disciplinary record ===
N	P	Nat.	Name	La Liga			UEFA CL			Copa del Rey			Other^{1}			Total			Notes
N	P	Nat.	Name	Yellow card	Second yellow card	Red card	Yellow card	Second yellow card	Red card	Yellow card	Second yellow card	Red card	Yellow card	Second yellow card	Red card	Yellow card	Second yellow card	Red card	Notes
2	DF	(Spain)	Dani Carvajal	10			2			2			2			16			
4	DF	(Spain)	Sergio Ramos	8		1	4			1			1			14		1	
14	MF	(Brazil)	Casemiro	9			1			2			1			13			
8	MF	(Germany)	Toni Kroos	6			2			2						10			
21	FW	(Spain)	Álvaro Morata	8												8			
6	DF	(Spain)	Nacho	4									1			5			
7	FW	(Portugal)	Cristiano Ronaldo	4			1									5			
12	DF	(Brazil)	Marcelo	2			1			2						5			
17	FW	(Spain)	Lucas Vázquez	4						1						5			
22	MF	(Spain)	Isco	4			1									5			
16	MF	(Croatia)	Mateo Kovačić	2			1			1						4			
19	MF	(Croatia)	Luka Modrić	2			2									4			
23	DF	(Brazil)	Danilo	2			1			1						4			
11	FW	(Wales)	Gareth Bale	3		1										3		1	
1	GK	(Costa Rica)	Keylor Navas	2												2			
10	MF	(Colombia)	James Rodríguez	1									1			2			
20	MF	(Spain)	Marco Asensio				1						1			2			
3	DF	(Portugal)	Pepe	1												1			
5	DF	(France)	Raphaël Varane	1												1			
13	GK	(Spain)	Kiko Casilla							1						1			

Last updated: 3 June 2017
Source: Matches
Ordered by (red card) , (second yellow card) and (yellow card)
(yellow card) = Number of bookings; (second yellow card) = Number of sending offs after a second yellow card; (red card) = Number of sending offs by a direct red card.

^{1} Includes 2016 UEFA Super Cup and 2016 FIFA Club World Cup.
