= Danilo (footballer, born July 1991) =

Brazilian footballer

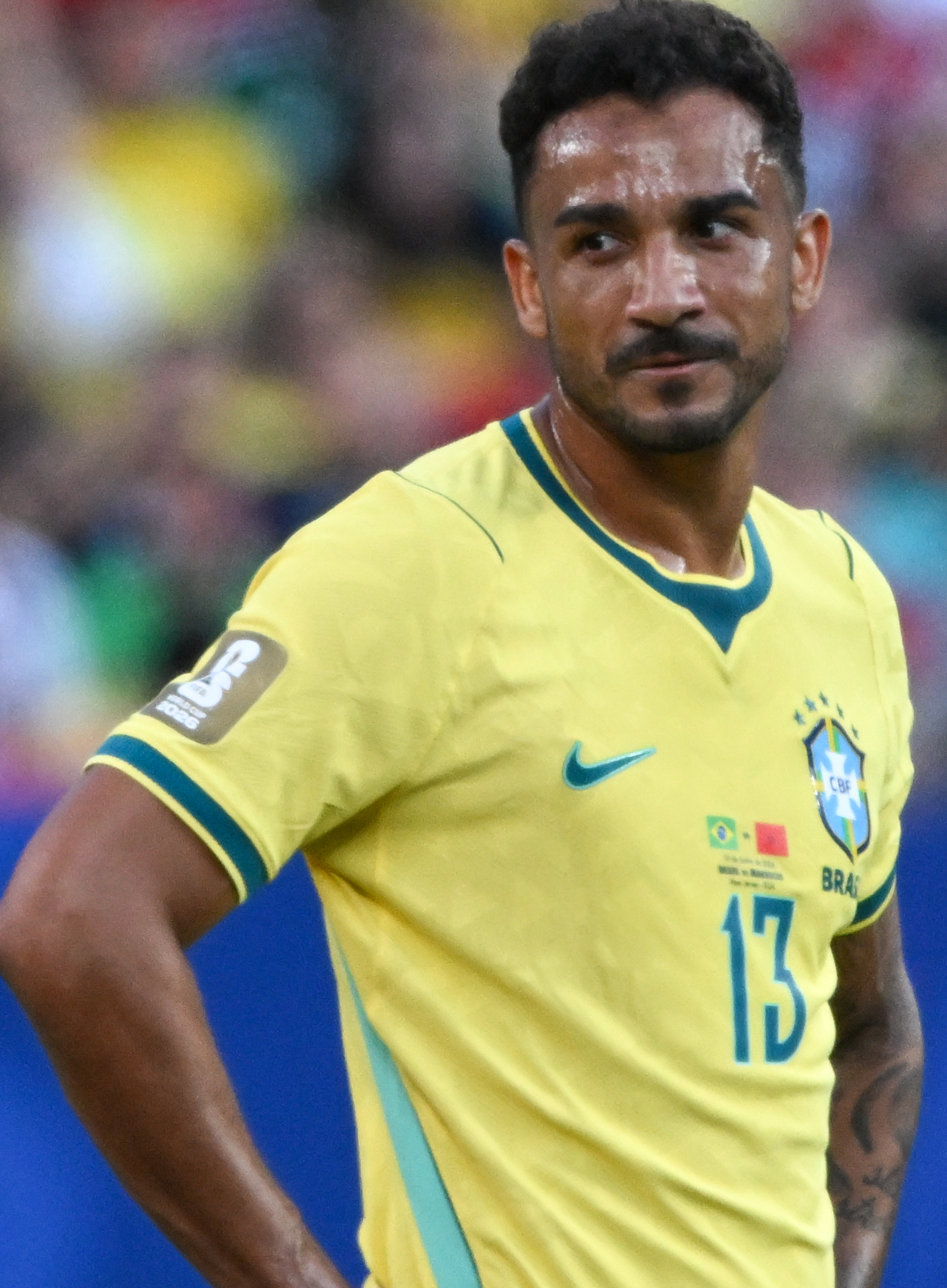
- Danilo with Brazil in 2026

Personal information
- Full name: Danilo Luiz da Silva
- Date of birth: 16 July 1991 (age 35)
- Place of birth: Bicas, Minas Gerais, Brazil
- Height: 1.84 m (6 ft 0 in)
- Positions: Centre-back; right-back

Team information
- Current team: Flamengo
- Number: 13

Youth career
- 2004–2005: Tupynambás
- 2006–2009: América Mineiro

Senior career*
Years	Team	Apps	(Gls)
2009–2010	América Mineiro	29	(2)
2010–2012	Santos	62	(5)
2012–2015	Porto	91	(11)
2015–2017	Real Madrid	41	(3)
2017–2019	Manchester City	34	(4)
2019–2025	Juventus	156	(8)
2025–	Flamengo	39	(2)

International career^{‡}
2011	Brazil U20	15	(2)
2012	Brazil Olympic	4	(1)
2011–2026	Brazil	75	(1)
Medal record
Representing Brazil
Copa América
Runner-up	2021 Brazil
Summer Olympics
Silver medal – second place	2012 London	Team
- * Club domestic league appearances and goals as of 23:37, 21 November 2026 (UTC) ‡ National team caps and goals as of 22:20, 5 July 2026 (UTC)

Danilo Luiz da Silva (born 15 July 1991), known as Danilo (Brazilian Portuguese: [dɐ̃ˈnilu]), is a Brazilian professional footballer who plays as a centre-back or right-back for Campeonato Brasileiro Série A club Flamengo.

Danilo began his career with América Mineiro before moving to Santos, where he scored the goal that won the 2011 Copa Libertadores. In January 2012, he moved to Portuguese club Porto, where he won consecutive Primeira Liga titles. In 2015, he joined Real Madrid following a €31.5 million transfer fee. In 2017, he joined Manchester City. In 2019, having won two Premier League titles, an FA Cup and two EFL Cups with City, Danilo joined Juventus, winning the Serie A title during his first season with the club. After 13 years, he left the European continent in 2025, signing for Flamengo, where he scored the goal that made them win their 4th Copa Libertadores title.

Danilo was first capped by the senior Brazil team in 2011, also winning the 2011 U-20 World Cup and a silver medal at the 2012 Summer Olympics. He represented the nation at the FIFA World Cup in 2018, 2022 and 2026, and the Copa América in 2021 and 2024.

== Club career ==
=== Early years & Santos ===
Danilo was born in Bicas, Minas Gerais. He played youth football with Tupynambás and América Mineiro, and competed at senior level with the latter club in the Campeonato Mineiro and the Série C, winning the latter in 2009 and gaining promotion.

In May 2010, Danilo was transferred to Santos. Investor DIS Esporte acquired 37.5% of his economic rights, Santos another 37.5% for free and the remaining 25% were retained by América. He won the Campeonato Paulista in 2011 and competed in two Série A seasons with the team.

Danilo played the full 90 minutes of both legs of the 2011 Copa Libertadores Finals against Peñarol, the first in central midfield and the second at right-back, and scored the decisive goal in a 2–1 victory following a goalless first match.

=== Porto ===
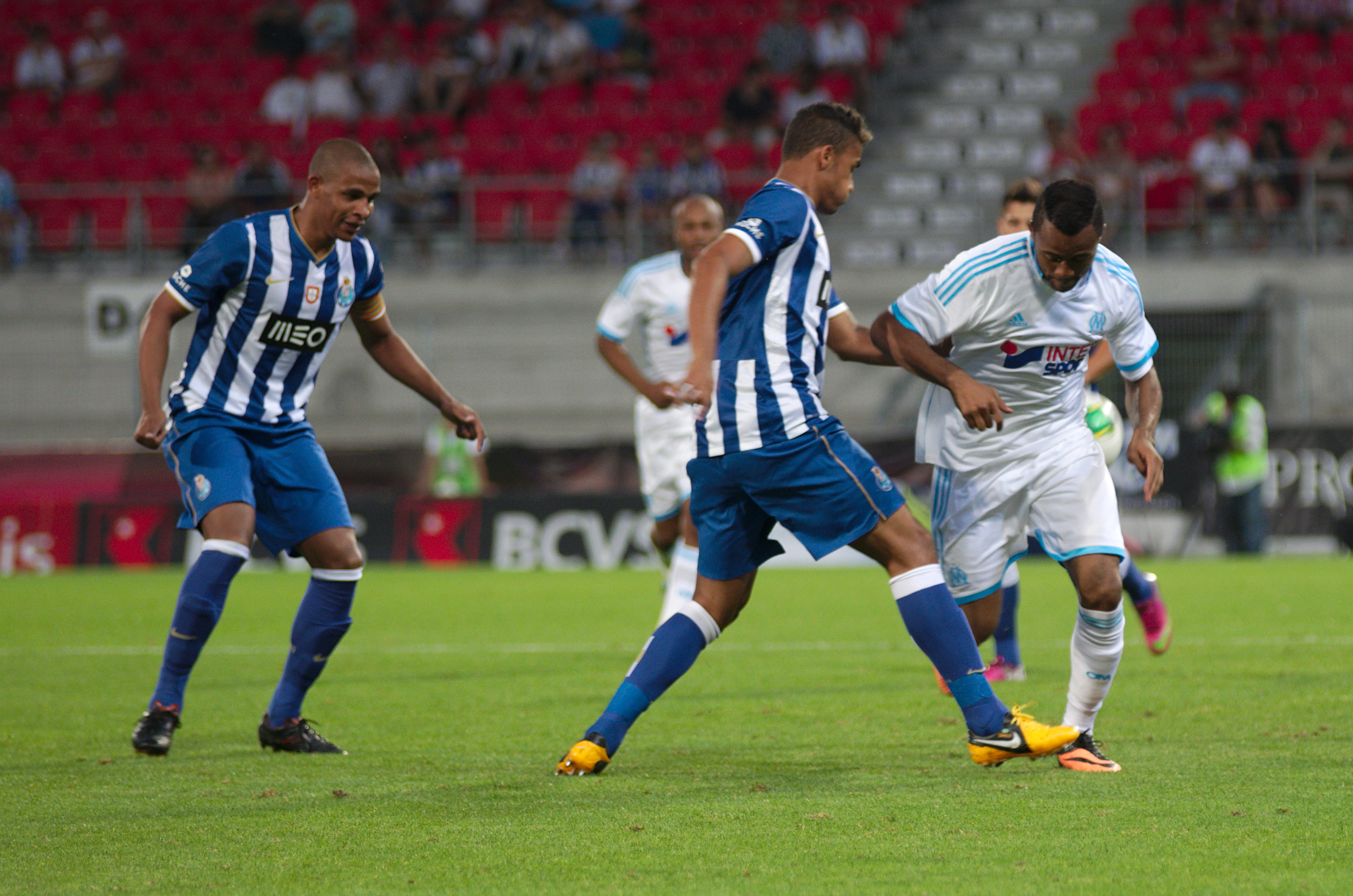
Danilo (centre) playing for Porto in 2013

In early January 2012, following the 2011 FIFA Club World Cup, Danilo signed for Portuguese club Porto on a contract lasting until June 2016 following a €13 million transfer fee paid by Porto. His contract included a €50 million release clause. He initially played understudy to Cristian Săpunaru, but soon became first choice, with compatriot Alex Sandro – who signed at the same time – featuring on the other defensive wing as the Vítor Pereira-led team won back-to-back Primeira Liga titles.

Danilo scored his fourth competitive goal of the 2014–15 season on 18 February with a penalty kick to equalise at 1–1 away to Basel in the Champions League round of 16.

=== Real Madrid ===
On 31 March 2015, it was announced that Danilo would join Real Madrid in July, with the Spaniards paying a €31.5 million transfer fee for his services and signing him to a six-year contract. He made his debut on 23 August in a goalless draw at Sporting Gijón, which was also the season opener. On 24 October, he scored his first goal for the team, in a 3–1 away win against Celta de Vigo.

Danilo contributed with seven appearances in the 2015–16 edition of the Champions League as Real Madrid won the tournament. In the final against Atlético Madrid, he came on as a substitute for injured Dani Carvajal early into the second half of a 1–1 draw and penalty shootout triumph.

In 2016–17, profiting from several physical ailments to Carvajal, Danilo contributed with 17 matches and one goal as the club was crowned La Liga champions for the first time in five years. He also played in three matches in the club's Champions League campaign, helping Madrid win its second consecutive Champions League title.

=== Manchester City ===
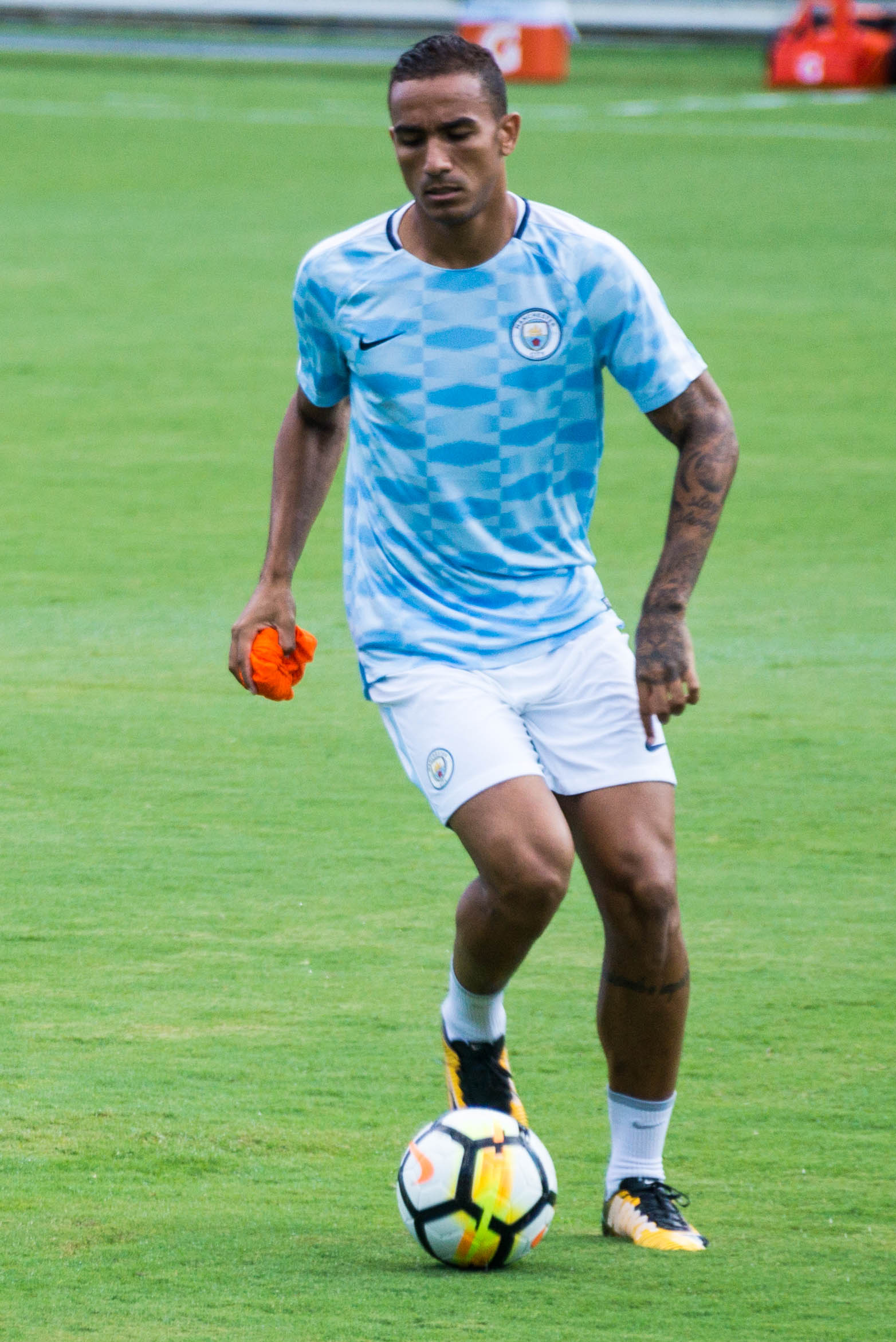
Danilo training with Manchester City in 2017

On 23 July 2017, Danilo signed for English Premier League club Manchester City on a five-year contract for a reported £26.5 million transfer fee. He scored his first goal for his new team on 23 December, replacing Fabian Delph late into the home fixture against AFC Bournemouth and scoring the final goal of a 4–0 home win.

=== Juventus ===
On 7 August 2019, Danilo signed for Serie A champions Juventus on a five-year contract following a €37 million transfer fee paid by Juventus. The transaction involved a part-exchange that saw João Cancelo move to Manchester City. Danilo made his Juventus debut on 31 August in a match against Napoli, in which he scored the opening goal of an eventual 4–3 home victory, which was also the fastest goal scored by a foreign player in Serie A.

In the 2020 Coppa Italia Final against Napoli on 17 June, following a 0–0 draw after regulation time, Danilo missed Juventus' second spot kick in the resulting shoot-out, hitting the ball over the crossbar. Napoli ultimately won the match 4–2 on penalties.

On 10 January 2021, in a Serie A game against Sassuolo, Danilo opened the scoring with a 25-meter goal; Juventus won 3–1.

Following the departure of Leonardo Bonucci, Danilo was appointed Juventus's captain for the 2023–24 season, becoming the club's first non-Italian captain since Omar Sívori in 1965.

On 27 January 2025, Danilo left Juventus by mutual consent.

=== Flamengo ===
On 29 January 2025, Danilo returned to Brazil and signed for Flamengo on a two-year deal.

In his first six months wearing the Malvadão colors, Danilo etched his name into football folklore. During the 2025 season, the defender made 38 appearances, starting in 27 of them, and displayed exceptional technical precision with a 93% pass accuracy and 3.3 successful long balls per game. Beyond his five goals and two assists, Danilo became a global icon on Saturday, November 29, in Lima, where he emerged as the hero of Flamengo by scoring the decisive goal in a 1–0 victory over Palmeiras to claim the CONMEBOL 2025 Copa Libertadores title. This goal secured him an unprecedented feat in world football history. His protagonist role continued into the FIFA Club World Cup; on December 13, he once again led the Rubro-Negro to victory, scoring the second goal in a 2–0 win over Pyramids FC of Egypt. Defensively, he rounded out the year with 3.9 ball recoveries per match and high discipline, committing only 0.7 fouls per game.

== International career ==
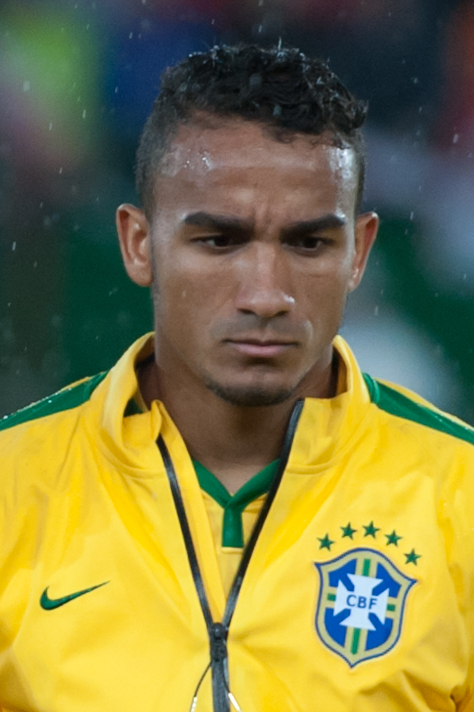
Danilo lining up for Brazil in 2014

Courtesy of his Santos performances, Danilo made his debut for Brazil on 14 September 2011 at the age of just 20, featuring in the first leg of that year's Superclásico de las Américas, a 0–0 away draw against Argentina (2–0 aggregate win). In the same year, he started for the under-20s at the FIFA U-20 World Cup, with the tournament in Colombia ending in victory.

Danilo represented the under-23 team at the 2012 Summer Olympics. He played four matches in Brazil's journey to the silver medal, scoring against New Zealand in the group stage (3–0).

Danilo was also named in Tite's squad for the 2018 FIFA World Cup in Russia, making his debut in the competition on 17 June by playing the entire 1–1 draw to Switzerland. He incurred an injury on 6 July the day before the quarter-final clash with Belgium, being sidelined for the remainder of the tournament.

Danilo scored his first senior international goal on 19 November 2019 in a 3–0 friendly win against South Korea played in Abu Dhabi.

In June 2021, he was included in Brazil's squad for the 2021 Copa América on home soil. He started in his nation's 1–0 defeat to rivals Argentina in the final on 10 July.

On 7 November 2022, Danilo was named in the squad for the 2022 FIFA World Cup. During the opening game against Serbia, Danilo injured his ankle, forcing him to skip the rest of the group stage.

On 18 May 2026, Danilo was selected for Brazil's squad for the 2026 FIFA World Cup.

== Style of play ==
Danilo playing for Brazil at the 2026 FIFA World Cup

In 2012, Marca compared Danilo to compatriot and fellow right-back Dani Alves, describing him as "a tireless right back with an attacking streak and a polished technique. His continual runs up and down the flank also serve to make him a tough defender, who plays well as a sweeper and anticipates the play. He measures 6 feet tall and, in spite of his slender build, does well up top," also dubbing him as being "one of the best right backs of the future," due to his high quality performances at the time. Although primarily a right-back, he has also been deployed as a right-winger, or even as a central or defensive midfielder in front of the back-line on occasion. In 2015, Tim Vickery, an expert on South American football, said the following of Danilo: "From Carlos Alberto to Cafu, Brazil have had more spectacular players at right-back than most - but Porto man Danilo is proving a splendid all-rounder. He can join the attack as an element of surprise, but his defensive skills are also sound." Under his Juventus manager Maurizio Sarri, Danilo has also been used as a makeshift left-back. A 2019 profile in Tuttosport by Giovanni Aramini also praised him for his tactical sense, positioning, and ball-winning capabilities, describing him as a "complete" defender. Under Andrea Pirlo, he has also been used as a right-sided centre-back in a three-man back-line. In addition to his defensive ability, Danilo has also been praised by pundits for his leadership qualities as Juventus's captain.

== Career statistics ==
=== Club ===
As of match played 21 November 2026

Appearances and goals by club, season and competition
Club	Season	League			State league		National cup (Note: Includes Taça de Portugal, Copa del Rey, FA Cup, Coppa Italia, Copa do Brasil)		League cup (Note: Includes Taça da Liga, EFL Cup)		Continental		Other		Total	
Club	Season	Division	Apps	Goals	Apps	Goals	Apps	Goals	Apps	Goals	Apps	Goals	Apps	Goals	Apps	Goals
América Mineiro	2009	Série C	8	0	2 (Note: Appearances in Campeonato Mineiro)	0	0	0	—		—		—		10	0
América Mineiro	2010	Série B	7	0	12	2	—		—		—		—		19	2
América Mineiro	Total		15	0	14	2	0	0	—		—		—		29	2
Santos	2010	Série A	26	4	—		0	0	—		0	0	—		26	4
Santos	2011	Série A	23	1	13 (Note: Appearances in Campeonato Paulista)	0	—		—		14 (Note: Appearances in Copa Libertadores)	4	2 (Note: Appearances in FIFA Club World Cup)	1	52	6
Santos	Total		49	5	13	0	0	0	—		14	4	2	1	78	10
Porto	2011–12	Primeira Liga	6	0	—		—		1	0	1 (Note: Appearance(s) in UEFA Europa League)	0	—		8	0
Porto	2012–13	Primeira Liga	28	2	—		2	0	5	0	7 (Note: Appearances in UEFA Champions League)	0	0	0	42	2
Porto	2013–14	Primeira Liga	28	3	—		5	0	3	0	12 (Note: Six appearances in UEFA Champions League, six appearances in UEFA Europa League)	0	0	0	48	3
Porto	2014–15	Primeira Liga	29	6	—		0	0	1	0	10	1	—		40	7
Porto	Total		91	11	—		7	0	10	0	30	1	0	0	138	12
Real Madrid	2015–16	La Liga	24	2	—		0	0	—		7	0	—		31	2
Real Madrid	2016–17	La Liga	17	1	—		5	0	—		3	0	0	0	25	1
Real Madrid	Total		41	3	—		5	0	—		10	0	—		56	3
Manchester City	2017–18	Premier League	23	3	—		3	0	6	0	6	0	—		38	3
Manchester City	2018–19	Premier League	11	1	—		4	0	5	0	2	0	0	0	22	1
Manchester City	Total		34	4	—		7	0	11	0	8	0	0	0	60	4
Juventus	2019–20	Serie A	22	2	—		4	0	—		6	0	0	0	32	2
Juventus	2020–21	Serie A	34	1	—		4	0	—		7	0	1 (Note: Appearance in Supercoppa Italiana)	0	46	1
Juventus	2021–22	Serie A	22	1	—		4	1	—		5	0	0	0	31	2
Juventus	2022–23	Serie A	37	3	—		4	0	—		13 (Note: Five appearances in UEFA Champions League, eight appearances in UEFA Europa League)	0	—		54	3
Juventus	2023–24	Serie A	29	1	—		5	0	—		—		—		34	1
Juventus	2024–25	Serie A	12	0	—		0	0	—		4	0	0	0	16	0
Juventus	Total		156	8	—		21	1	—		35	0	1	0	213	9
Flamengo	2025	Série A	20	1	4 (Note: Appearances in Campeonato Carioca)	0	2	1	—		6	1	4 (Note: One appearance in Supercopa do Brasil, two appearances and one goal in FIFA Club World Cup, one appearance and one goal in FIFA Intercontinental Cup)	2	36	5
Flamengo	2026	Série A	12	1	3	0	2	0	—		4	0	1 (Note: Appearance(s) in Recopa Sudamericana)	0	22	1
Flamengo	Total		32	2	7	0	4	1	—		10	1	5	2	58	6
Career total			418	33	34	2	44	2	21	5	107	6	8	3	632	46

=== International ===
As of match played 5 July 2026

Appearances and goals by national team and year
National team	Year	Apps	Goals
Brazil	2011	2	0
Brazil	2012	4	0
Brazil	2013	0	0
Brazil	2014	5	0
Brazil	2015	4	0
Brazil	2017	1	0
Brazil	2018	6	0
Brazil	2019	3	1
Brazil	2020	4	0
Brazil	2021	15	0
Brazil	2022	5	0
Brazil	2023	5	0
Brazil	2024	11	0
Brazil	2025	2	0
Brazil	2026	8	0
Total		75	1

Scores and results list Brazil's goal tally first.

List of international goals scored by Danilo
No.	Date	Venue	Opponent	Score	Result	Competition
1	19 November 2019	Mohammed bin Zayed Stadium, Abu Dhabi, United Arab Emirates	South Korea	3–0	3–0	Friendly

== Honours ==
América Mineiro

- Campeonato Brasileiro Série C: 2009

Santos

- Campeonato Paulista: 2011
- Copa Libertadores: 2011

Porto

- Primeira Liga: 2011–12, 2012–13

Real Madrid

- La Liga: 2016–17
- UEFA Champions League: 2015–16, 2016–17
- UEFA Super Cup: 2016
- FIFA Club World Cup: 2016

Manchester City

- Premier League: 2017–18, 2018–19
- FA Cup: 2018–19
- EFL Cup: 2017–18, 2018–19

Juventus

- Serie A: 2019–20
- Coppa Italia: 2020–21, 2023–24
- Supercoppa Italiana: 2020

Flamengo

- FIFA Challenger Cup: 2025
- FIFA Derby of the Americas: 2025
- Copa Libertadores: 2025
- Campeonato Brasileiro Série A: 2025
- Supercopa do Brasil: 2025
- Campeonato Carioca: 2025, 2026

Brazil U20

- FIFA U-20 World Cup: 2011
- South American U-20 Championship: 2011

Brazil U23

- Summer Olympic Games Silver medal: 2012

Individual

- Campeonato Mineiro Best Newcomer: 2010
- IFFHS CONMEBOL Team of the Year: 2020
- Copa Libertadores Team of the Tournament: 2025
- South American Team of the Year: 2025
