= Pequeri =

Coordinates: 21°50′S 43°07′W

- Municipality
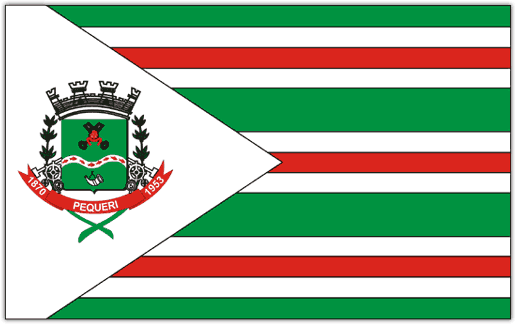
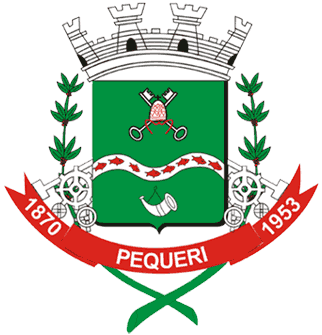
- Flag Coat of arms
- Interactive map of Pequeri
- Country: Brazil
- Region: Southeast
- State: Minas Gerais
- Mesoregion: Vale do Rio Doce

Population (2020)
  - Total: 3,330
- Time zone: UTC−3 (BRT)

Pequeri is a municipality in the state of Minas Gerais in the Southeast region of Brazil.

== See also ==
- List of municipalities in Minas Gerais
