= Mar de Espanha =

Coordinates: 21°52′S 43°01′W

- Municipality
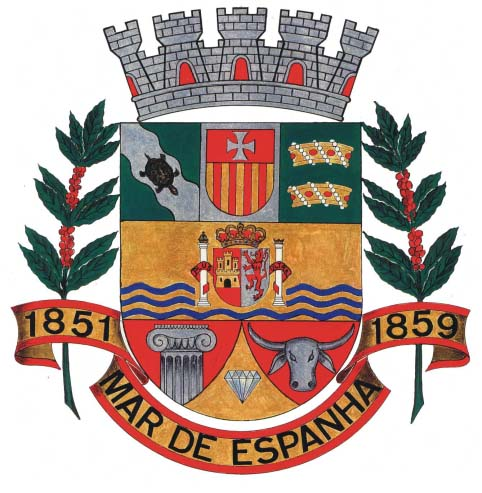
- Flag Coat of arms
- Interactive map of Mar de Espanha
- Country: Brazil
- Region: Southeast
- State: Minas Gerais
- Mesoregion: Zona da Mata

Population (2020)
  - Total: 12,901
- Time zone: UTC−3 (BRT)

Mar de Espanha is a municipality in the state of Minas Gerais in the Southeast region of Brazil.

== See also ==
- List of municipalities in Minas Gerais
