= 2023–24 Villarreal CF season =

Villarreal CF
2023–24 season
- President: Fernando Roig
- Head coach: Quique Setién (until 5 September); Pacheta (9 September–10 November); Miguel Ángel Tena (interim, 10–13 November); Marcelino (from 13 November)
- Stadium: Estadio de la Cerámica
- La Liga: 8th
- Copa del Rey: Round of 32
- UEFA Europa League: Round of 16
- Top goalscorer: League: Alexander Sørloth (23); All: Alexander Sørloth (26)
- Highest home attendance: 21,679 vs Barcelona
- Lowest home attendance: 9,365 vs Maccabi Haifa
- Biggest win: Chiclana 0–5 Villarreal
- Biggest defeat: Marseille 4–0 Villarreal
| Home colours | Away colours | Third colours |

The 2023–24 season was Villarreal Club de Fútbol's 101st season in existence and 11th consecutive season in La Liga. They also competed in the Copa del Rey and the UEFA Europa League.

Villarreal would be eliminated in the round of 32 of the Copa del Rey by Unionistas, and the round of 16 of the Europa League by Marseille.

== Players ==
=== First-team squad ===
As of 24 January 2024

Note: Flags indicate national team as defined under FIFA eligibility rules; some limited exceptions apply. Players may hold more than one non-FIFA nationality.

| No. | Pos. | Nation | Player |
|---|---|---|---|
| 1 | GK | ESP | Pepe Reina |
| 2 | DF | COL | Yerson Mosquera (on loan from Wolverhampton Wanderers) |
| 3 | DF | ESP | Raúl Albiol (captain) |
| 4 | MF | ESP | Santi Comesaña |
| 5 | DF | ESP | Jorge Cuenca |
| 6 | MF | FRA | Étienne Capoue |
| 7 | FW | ESP | Gerard Moreno (3rd captain) |
| 8 | DF | ARG | Juan Foyth |
| 9 | FW | POR | Gonçalo Guedes (on loan from Wolverhampton Wanderers) |
| 10 | MF | ESP | Dani Parejo |
| 11 | FW | NOR | Alexander Sørloth |
| 12 | DF | CIV | Eric Bailly |
| 13 | GK | DEN | Filip Jörgensen |
| 14 | MF | ESP | Manu Trigueros (vice-captain) |

| No. | Pos. | Nation | Player |
|---|---|---|---|
| 15 | FW | ESP | José Luis Morales |
| 16 | MF | ESP | Álex Baena |
| 17 | DF | ESP | Kiko Femenía |
| 18 | DF | ESP | Alberto Moreno |
| 19 | MF | FRA | Francis Coquelin |
| 20 | MF | ESP | Ramon Terrats |
| 21 | FW | ESP | Yeremy Pino |
| 22 | MF | ESP | Denis Suárez |
| 23 | DF | ALG | Aïssa Mandi |
| 24 | DF | ESP | Alfonso Pedraza |
| 25 | FW | BFA | Bertrand Traoré |
| 26 | DF | ESP | Adrià Altimira |
| 27 | FW | MAR | Ilias Akhomach |
| 37 | DF | ESP | Carlos Romero |

=== Out on loan ===
Note: Flags indicate national team as defined under FIFA eligibility rules; some limited exceptions apply. Players may hold more than one non-FIFA nationality.

| No. | Pos. | Nation | Player |
|---|---|---|---|
| — | DF | COL | Johan Mojica (at Osasuna until 30 June 2024) |
| — | FW | NED | Arnaut Danjuma (at Everton until 30 June 2024) |
| — | FW | FRA | Haissem Hassan (at Sporting Gijón until 30 June 2024) |

| No. | Pos. | Nation | Player |
|---|---|---|---|
| — | FW | ARG | Thiago Ojeda (at Lugo until 30 June 2024) |
| — | FW | CHI | Ben Brereton Díaz (at Sheffield United until 30 June 2024) |

== Transfers ==
=== In ===
| Pos. | Player | Transferred from | Fee | Date | Ref. |
|---|---|---|---|---|---|
| MF | (Netherlands) Arnaut Danjuma | (England) Tottenham Hotspur | Loan return | 30 June 2023 | |
| MF | (Spain) Santi Comesaña | (Spain) Rayo Vallecano | Free | 1 July 2023 | |
| MF | (Spain) Denis Suárez | (Spain) Celta Vigo | Free | 1 July 2023 | |
| MF | (Spain) Ramon Terrats | (Spain) Girona | €2,500,000 | 1 July 2023 | |
| FW | (Morocco) Ilias Akhomach | (Spain) Barcelona | Free | 3 July 2023 | |
| FW | (Chile) Ben Brereton Díaz | (England) Blackburn Rovers | Free | 4 July 2023 | |
| FW | (Norway) Alexander Sørloth | (Germany) RB Leipzig | €10,000,000 | 25 July 2023 | |
| DF | (Italy) Matteo Gabbia | (Italy) Milan | Loan | 26 July 2023 | |
| DF | (Ivory Coast) Eric Bailly | (Turkey) Beşiktaş | Free | 1 January 2024 | |
| FW | (Portugal) Gonçalo Guedes | (England) Wolverhampton Wanderers | Loan | 19 January 2024 | |
| DF | (Colombia) Yerson Mosquera | (England) Wolverhampton Wanderers | Loan | 23 January 2024 | |
| FW | (Burkina Faso) Bertrand Traoré | (England) Aston Villa | Free | 1 February 2024 | |

=== Out ===
| Pos. | Player | Transferred to | Fee | Date | Ref. |
|---|---|---|---|---|---|
| FW | (Spain) Álex Millán | (Spain) Oviedo | Free | 1 July 2023 | |
| MF | (Spain) Manu Morlanes | (Spain) Mallorca | €4,000,000 | 1 July 2023 | |
| FW | (Senegal) Nicolas Jackson | (England) Chelsea | €37,000,000 | 1 July 2023 | |
| FW | (Senegal) Boulaye Dia | (Italy) Salernitana | €12,000,000 | 1 July 2023 | |
| MF | (Spain) Vicente Iborra | (Greece) Olympiacos | Undisclosed | 11 July 2023 | |
| DF | (Spain) Pau Torres | (England) Aston Villa | Undisclosed | 12 July 2023 | |
| MF | (Spain) Iván Martín | (Spain) Girona | 2,000,000 | 22 July 2023 | |
| FW | (Netherlands) Arnaut Danjuma | (England) Everton | Loan + €3,000,000 | 23 July 2023 | |
| DF | (Colombia) Johan Mojica | (Spain) Osasuna | Loan | 26 July 2023 | |
| FW | (Nigeria) Samuel Chukwueze | (Italy) Milan | €20,000,000 | 27 July 2023 | |
| FW | (France) Haissem Hassan | (Spain) Sporting Gijón | Loan | 1 August 2023 | |
| DF | (Italy) Matteo Gabbia | (Italy) Milan | Loan return | 3 January 2024 | |
| FW | (Chile) Ben Brereton Díaz | (England) Sheffield United | Loan | 5 January 2024 | |

Notes
1.Exercised buy option.
2.Up to €8 million in bonuses.

=== New contracts ===
| Position | Player | Until | Ref. |
|---|---|---|---|
| GK | (Spain) Pepe Reina | June 2024 | |
| FW | (France) Haissem Hassan | June 2025 | |

== Pre-season and friendlies ==
Win Draw Loss Fixtures

| 15 July 2023 Friendly | St. Gallen | 6–1 | Villarreal | St. Gallen, Switzerland |
| 18:00 CEST (UTC+2) | Witzig 5'; Von Moos 11'; Geubbels 36'; Schmidt 40'; Görtler 46'; Karlen 48' | Report | Chukwueze 30' | Stadium: kybunpark Referee: Lionel Tschudi (Switzerland) |

| 18 July 2023 Friendly | Rheindorf Altach | 0–3 | Villarreal | Altach, Austria |
| 19:30 CEST (UTC+2) | Strauß (yellow card) 42' | Report | Gerard 21'; Pedraza 57'; Terrats 74' | Stadium: Stadion Schnabelholz; Attendance: 2,735; Referee: Daniel Pfister (Austria) |

| 22 July 2023 Friendly | Hannover 96 | 3–0 | Villarreal | Hanover, Germany |
| 14:00 CEST (UTC+2) | Börner (yellow card) 38'; Schaub 44', 67', 86' | Report | | Stadium: Heinz von Heiden-Arena; Attendance: 11,000; Referee: Robert Schröder (Germany) |

| 27 July 2023 Friendly | Feyenoord | 1–1 | Villarreal | Rotterdam, Netherlands |
| 19:00 CEST (UTC+2) | Paixão (yellow card) 17'; Jahanbakhsh 52' (pen.), (yellow card) 73'; Minteh (yellow card) 78' | Report | Capoue 42'; Reina 51'; Femenía (yellow card) 74' | Stadium: De Kuip; Attendance: 30,000; Referee: Jeroen Manschot (Netherlands) |

| 30 July 2023 Troféu Cinco Violinos | Sporting CP | 3–0 | Villarreal | Lisbon, Portugal |
| 20:00 WEST (UTC+1) | Matheus Reis (yellow card) 26'; Edwards 44'; Gonçalves 71'; Paulinho 75' | Report | Parejo (yellow card) 8'; Cuenca (yellow card) 21'; Gabbia (yellow card) 78' | Stadium: Estádio José Alvalade; Referee: Halim Aqa Shirzad (Afghanistan) |

| 5 August 2023 Sela Cup | Nice | 1–1 | Villarreal | Newcastle upon Tyne, England |
| 12:30 BST (UTC+1) | Sanson 56'; Bard (yellow card) 90' | Report | Gabbia (yellow card) 8'; Suárez (yellow card) 29'; Brereton (penalty missed) 51', 51' | Stadium: St James' Park; Referee: Robert Jones (England) |

| 6 August 2023 Sela Cup | Newcastle United | 4–0 | Villarreal | Newcastle upon Tyne, England |
| 16:00 BST (UTC+1) | Murphy 6'; Joelinton (yellow card) 22', (goal) 75'; Longstaff (yellow card) 31'; Ritchie (yellow card) 34'; Dummett (yellow card) 47'; Barnes 61', 78' | Report | Terrats (yellow card) 13'; Baena (yellow card) 28'; Lanchi (yellow card) 63' | Stadium: St James' Park; Attendance: 34,621; Referee: Anthony Taylor (England) |

== Competitions ==
=== Overall record ===
| Competition | First match | Last match | Starting round | Final position | Record | | | | | | | |
| Competition | First match | Last match | Starting round | Final position | Pld | W | D | L | GF | GA | GD | Win % |
|---|---|---|---|---|---|---|---|---|---|---|---|---|
| La Liga | 13 August 2023 | 25 May 2024 | Matchday 1 | 8th | 38 | 14 | 11 | 13 | 65 | 65 | +0 | 36.84 |
| Copa del Rey | 2 November 2023 | 8 January 2024 | First round | Round of 32 | 3 | 2 | 1 | 0 | 8 | 2 | +6 | 66.67 |
| UEFA Europa League | 21 September 2023 | 14 March 2024 | Group stage | Round of 16 | 8 | 5 | 1 | 2 | 12 | 12 | +0 | 62.50 |
| Total | | | | | 49 | 21 | 13 | 15 | 85 | 79 | +6 | 42.86 |

Source: Soccerway

=== La Liga ===
==== League table ====
| Pos | Team | Pld | W | D | L | GF | GA | GD | Pts | Qualification or relegation |
|---|---|---|---|---|---|---|---|---|---|---|
| 6 | Real Sociedad | 38 | 16 | 12 | 10 | 51 | 39 | +12 | 60 | Qualification for the Europa League league phase (Note: Since the winners of the 2023–24 Copa del Rey, Athletic Bilbao, qualified for European competition based on league position, the Europa League berth awarded to the Copa del Rey winners was passed to the sixth-placed team, and the Conference League berth awarded to the sixth-placed team was passed to the seventh-placed team.) |
| 7 | Real Betis | 38 | 14 | 15 | 9 | 48 | 45 | +3 | 57 | Qualification for the Conference League play-off round |
| 8 | Villarreal | 38 | 14 | 11 | 13 | 65 | 65 | 0 | 53 | |
| 9 | Valencia | 38 | 13 | 10 | 15 | 40 | 45 | −5 | 49 | |
| 10 | Alavés | 38 | 12 | 10 | 16 | 36 | 46 | −10 | 46 | |

Source: LaLiga EA Sports
Rules for classification: 1) Points; 2) Head-to-head points; 3) Head-to-head goal difference; 4) Goal difference; 5) Goals scored; 6) Fair-play points
(Note: Head-to-head record is used only after all the matches between the teams in question have been played)

==== Results summary ====
| Overall | | | | | | | | Home | | | | | | Away | | | | | |
| Pld | W | D | L | GF | GA | GD | Pts | W | D | L | GF | GA | GD | W | D | L | GF | GA | GD |
|---|---|---|---|---|---|---|---|---|---|---|---|---|---|---|---|---|---|---|---|
| 38 | 14 | 11 | 13 | 65 | 65 | 0 | 53 | 7 | 5 | 7 | 36 | 32 | +4 | 7 | 6 | 6 | 29 | 33 | −4 |

Source: La Liga

==== Results by round ====
| Round | 1 | 2 | 3 | 4 | 5 | 6 | 7 | 8 | 9 | 10 | 11 | 12 | 13 | 14 | 15 | 16 | 17 | 18 | 19 | 20 | 21 | 22 | 23 | 24 | 25 | 26 | 27 | 28 | 29 | 30 | 31 | 32 | 33 | 34 | 35 | 36 | 37 | 38 |
|---|---|---|---|---|---|---|---|---|---|---|---|---|---|---|---|---|---|---|---|---|---|---|---|---|---|---|---|---|---|---|---|---|---|---|---|---|---|---|
| Ground | H | A | H | A | H | A | H | A | H | H | A | H | A | H | A | H | A | H | A | A | H | A | H | A | H | A | H | A | H | H | A | A | H | A | H | A | H | A |
| Result | L | W | L | L | W | D | L | D | L | D | W | L | L | W | D | L | L | W | L | L | D | W | D | D | D | W | W | W | W | L | D | W | W | L | W | W | D | D |
| Position | 14 | 11 | 13 | 15 | 13 | 12 | 13 | 13 | 16 | 14 | 12 | 13 | 14 | 12 | 12 | 13 | 14 | 13 | 13 | 15 | 14 | 14 | 14 | 13 | 13 | 13 | 12 | 11 | 9 | 10 | 9 | 9 | 9 | 9 | 9 | 8 | 8 | 8 |

Source: La Liga
A = Away; H = Home; W = Win; D = Draw; L = Loss

==== Matches ====
The league fixtures were unveiled on 22 June 2023.

| 13 August 2023 1 | Villarreal | 1–2 | Real Betis | Villarreal |
| 19:30 CEST (UTC+2) | Cuenca 61'; Mandi (yellow card) 70' | Report | Pérez 20'; Iglesias (yellow card) 27'; Luiz Felipe (yellow card) 60'; Rodríguez (yellow card) 88'; Willian José 90+5' | Stadium: Estadio de la Cerámica; Attendance: 17,825; Referee: Miguel Ángel Ortiz Arias |

| 18 August 2023 2 | Mallorca | 0–1 | Villarreal | Palma |
| 19:30 CEST (UTC+2) | Mascarell (yellow card) 2'; Valjent (yellow card) 73' | Report | Brereton (yellow card) 45'; Terrats (yellow card) 45+5'; Baena (yellow card) 51'; Gerard 62'; Comesaña (yellow card) 83' | Stadium: Estadi Mallorca Son Moix; Attendance: 17,775; Referee: Javier Alberola Rojas |

| 27 August 2023 3 | Villarreal | 3–4 | Barcelona | Villarreal |
| 17:30 CEST (UTC+2) | Foyth 26', (yellow card) 45+6'; Sørloth 40'; Baena 50'; Terrats (yellow card) 57'; Gabbia (yellow card) 80' | Report | Gavi 12'; De Jong 15'; Yamal (yellow card) 44'; Lewandowski (yellow card) 45+6', (goal) 71'; Torres 68'; García (yellow card) 82' | Stadium: Estadio de la Cerámica; Attendance: 21,679; Referee: Alejandro Hernández Hernández |

| 1 September 2023 4 | Cádiz | 3–1 | Villarreal | Cádiz |
| 19:30 CEST (UTC+2) | Ramos 18', (yellow card) 19'; Machís 30' (pen.), 50'; Alejo (yellow card) 22'; L. Hernández (yellow card) 80'; Fali (yellow card) 82'; Alcaraz (yellow card) 86' | Report | Sørloth 10'; Pedraza (red card) 22'; Albiol (yellow card) 35'; Cuenca (yellow card) 53'; Baena (yellow card) 61'; Comesaña (yellow card) 90+5' | Stadium: Nuevo Mirandilla; Attendance: 18,557; Referee: Juan Luis Pulido Santana |

| 17 September 2023 5 | Villarreal | 2–1 | Almería | Villarreal |
| 16:15 CEST (UTC+2) | Capoue (yellow card) 26'; Gerard 45+5'; Pino (yellow card) 90+2'; Sørloth 90+4' | Report | Akieme 44'; Embarba (yellow card) 53'; Chumi (yellow card) 84'; Puigmal (yellow card) 89' | Stadium: Estadio de la Cerámica; Attendance: 18,467; Referee: Francisco José Hernández Maeso |

| 24 September 2023 6 | Rayo Vallecano | 1–1 | Villarreal | Madrid |
| 16:15 CEST (UTC+2) | Pérez 16'; García (yellow card) 18'; Camello (yellow card) 63' | Report | Sørloth 15'; Moreno (yellow card) 62' (yellow-red card) 77'; Comesaña (yellow card) 73' | Stadium: Campo de Fútbol de Vallecas; Attendance: 12,865; Referee: Jorge Figueroa Vázquez |

| 27 September 2023 7 | Villarreal | 1–2 | Girona | Villarreal |
| 19:00 CEST (UTC+2) | Pino (yellow card) 15'; Parejo 49' (pen.); Baena (yellow card) 87'; Brereton (yellow card) 90+1' | Report | Dovbyk 56'; Herrera (yellow card) 58'; E. García 61'; Gutiérrez (yellow card) 90+1' | Stadium: Estadio de la Cerámica; Attendance: 17,188; Referee: José María Sánchez Martínez |

| 30 September 2023 8 | Getafe | 0–0 | Villarreal | Getafe |
| 14:00 CEST (UTC+2) | Óscar (yellow card) 30'; Greenwood (yellow card) 53' | Report | Pedraza (yellow card) 5'; Baena (red card) 24'; Jörgensen (yellow card) 62'; Pino (yellow card) 67'; Femenía (yellow card) 74' | Stadium: Coliseum Alfonso Pérez; Attendance: 11,255; Referee: Mateo Busquets Ferrer |

| 8 October 2023 9 | Villarreal | 1–2 | Las Palmas | Villarreal |
| 14:00 CEST (UTC+2) | Pino (yellow card) 45+1'; Parejo (yellow card) 68'; Gerard 90+2'; Akhomach (yellow card) 90+6'; Capoue (yellow card) 90+10' | Report | Coco 45+2'; M. Cardona 51' (pen.), (yellow card) 90+4'; Marvin (yellow card) 68'; Rodríguez (yellow card) 72'; Kaba (yellow card) 90+5' | Stadium: Estadio de la Cerámica; Attendance: 16,249; Referee: Alejandro Muñiz Ruiz |

| 22 October 2023 10 | Villarreal | 1–1 | Alavés | Villarreal |
| 18:30 CEST (UTC+2) | Pedraza (yellow card) 9'; Sørloth (yellow card) 23'; Femenía (yellow card) 35'; Comesaña (yellow card) 58'; Gerard 65' (pen.) | Report | Guevara (yellow card) 14'; Sivera (yellow card) 33'; Abqar (yellow card) 36'; Omorodion 48' | Stadium: Estadio de la Cerámica; Attendance: 17,498; Referee: Jesús Gil Manzano |

| 30 October 2023 11 | Granada | 2–3 | Villarreal | Granada |
| 21:00 CET (UTC+1) | Sánchez 29'; Uzuni 34' | Report | Gerard 18', 23' (pen.); Sørloth 28'; Baena (yellow card) 50'; Albiol (yellow card) 68'; Romero (yellow card) 73'; Parejo (yellow card) 90' | Stadium: Nuevo Los Cármenes; Attendance: 16,638; Referee: Javier Iglesias Villanueva |

| 5 November 2023 12 | Villarreal | 2–3 | Athletic Bilbao | Villarreal |
| 18:30 CET (UTC+1) | Gabbia (yellow card) 19'; Albiol (yellow card) 72'; Mandi (yellow card) 74'; Femenía (yellow card) 76'; Gerard 86'; Sørloth 87' | Report | Ruiz de Galarreta 2', (yellow card) 90+5'; N. Williams 22', (yellow card) 41'; I. Williams 32'; De Marcos (yellow card) 44'; D. García (yellow card) 89' | Stadium: Estadio de la Cerámica; Attendance: 18,709; Referee: Guillermo Cuadra Fernández |

| 12 November 2023 13 | Atlético Madrid | 3–1 | Villarreal | Madrid |
| 21:00 CET (UTC+1) | Witsel 45+1'; Griezmann 80'; Lino 85' | Report | Gerard 20'; Capoue (yellow card) 45+2'; Akhomach (yellow card) 77' | Stadium: Cívitas Metropolitano; Attendance: 56,632; Referee: Francisco José Hernández Maeso |

| 26 November 2023 14 | Villarreal | 3–1 | Osasuna | Villarreal |
| 14:00 CET (UTC+1) | Morales 57', 71', 80' | Report | Catena 78' | Stadium: Estadio de la Cerámica; Attendance: 16,389; Referee: Ricardo de Burgos Bengoetxea |

| 3 December 2023 15 | Sevilla | 1–1 | Villarreal | Seville |
| 18:30 CET (UTC+1) | Sow (yellow card) 45+3'; Juanlu (yellow card) 52'; Salas 75'; Rakitić (yellow card) 90+6' | Report | Pedraza (yellow card) 45'; Altimira (yellow card) 54'; Morales 77'; Reina (yellow card) 90+8' | Stadium: Ramón Sánchez Pizjuán; Attendance: 33,898; Referee: Isidro Díaz de Mera Escuderos |

| 9 December 2023 16 | Villarreal | 0–3 | Real Sociedad | Villarreal |
| 18:30 CET (UTC+1) | Capoue (yellow card) 23'; Pedraza (yellow card) 49' | Report | Merino 38'; Zubimendi 41', (yellow card) 60'; Kubo 45+4' | Stadium: Estadio de la Cerámica; Attendance: 19,344; Referee: Mario Melero López |

| 17 December 2023 17 | Real Madrid | 4–1 | Villarreal | Madrid |
| 21:00 CET (UTC+1) | Bellingham 25', (yellow card) 67'; Rodrygo 37'; Brahim 64'; Modrić 68'; Tchouaméni (yellow card) 84' | Report | Morales 54'; Altimira (yellow card) 67'; Akhomach (yellow card) 74'; Capoue (yellow card) 85' | Stadium: Santiago Bernabéu; Attendance: 70,500; Referee: Jorge Figueroa Vázquez |

| 20 December 2023 18 | Villarreal | 3–2 | Celta Vigo | Villarreal |
| 21:30 CET (UTC+1) | Pedraza 13'; Mandi 40'; Parejo 48' (pen.); Baena (yellow card) 75'; Comesaña (yellow card) 76' | Report | Vázquez (yellow card) 46'; Douvikas 52', (yellow card) 84'; Larsen 57'; Mingueza (yellow card) 72'; Sánchez (yellow card) 82' | Stadium: Estadio de la Cerámica; Attendance: 14,687; Referee: César Soto Grado |

| 2 January 2024 19 | Valencia | 3–1 | Villarreal | Valencia |
| 21:30 CET (UTC+1) | Yaremchuk 4'; Pepelu 27' (pen.), 57' (pen.); Gayà (yellow card) 64'; López (yellow card) 74' | Report | Bailly (yellow card) 37'; Parejo (yellow card) 49'; Capoue (yellow card) 56'; Gerard 73'; Terrats (yellow card) 80'; Cuenca (yellow card) 90+2' | Stadium: Mestalla; Attendance: 44,973; Referee: Jesús Gil Manzano |

| 13 January 2024 20 | Las Palmas | 3–0 | Villarreal | Las Palmas |
| 14:00 CET (UTC+1) | Rodríguez 8', 63'; Suárez (yellow card) 16'; Muñoz (yellow card) 16'; Herzog (yellow card) 34', (goal) 51'; S. Cardona (yellow card) 43' | Report | Altimira (yellow card) 1'; Baena (yellow card) 19'; Bailly (yellow card) 39' | Stadium: Estadio Gran Canaria; Attendance: 24,485; Referee: Javier Iglesias Villanueva |

| 20 January 2024 21 | Villarreal | 1–1 | Mallorca | Villarreal |
| 16:15 CET (UTC+1) | Sørloth (yellow card) 44', (goal) 45+1'; Reina (red card) 62'; Femenía (yellow card) 82' | Report | Larin (yellow card) 27'; Darder (yellow card) 83'; Llabrés 90+1' | Stadium: Estadio de la Cerámica; Attendance: 16,479; Referee: Miguel Ángel Ortiz Arias |
Note: Reina was sent off for dissent as an unused substitute.

| 27 January 2024 22 | Barcelona | 3–5 | Villarreal | Barcelona |
| 18:30 CET (UTC+1) | Romeu (yellow card) 33'; Gündoğan 60'; Pedri 68'; Lewandowski (yellow card) 68'; Bailly 72' (o.g.); Araújo (yellow card) 89' | Report | Baena (yellow card) 16'; Gerard 41'; Akhomach 54'; Bailly (yellow card) 68'; Guedes 84'; Mosquera (yellow card) 89'; Cuenca (yellow card) 90+4'; Sørloth 90+9'; Morales 90+12' | Stadium: Estadi Olímpic Lluís Companys; Attendance: 46,229; Referee: José Luis Munuera Montero |

| 4 February 2024 23 | Villarreal | 0–0 | Cádiz | Villarreal |
| 14:00 CET (UTC+1) | Coquelin (yellow card) 47'; Comesaña (yellow card) 67'; Baena (yellow card) 90+4' | Report | Carcelén (yellow card) 69' | Stadium: Estadio de la Cerámica; Attendance: 17,183; Referee: Pablo González Fuertes |

| 10 February 2024 24 | Alavés | 1–1 | Villarreal | Vitoria-Gasteiz |
| 14:00 CET (UTC+1) | Omorodion 25' | Report | Cuenca 42', (yellow card) 44'; Sørloth (yellow card) 71' | Stadium: Mendizorrotza; Attendance: 14,523; Referee: Mario Melero López |

| 16 February 2024 25 | Villarreal | 1–1 | Getafe | Villarreal |
| 21:00 CET (UTC+1) | Moreno 56' | Report | Maksimović 24'; Iglesias (yellow card) 38' | Stadium: Estadio de la Cerámica; Attendance: 16,869; Referee: Javier Alberola Rojas |

| 23 February 2024 26 | Real Sociedad | 1–3 | Villarreal | San Sebastián |
| 21:00 CET (UTC+1) | Le Normand (yellow card) 51'; Silva (yellow card) 62'; Zakharyan (yellow card) 68'; Merino 86' | Report | Comesaña 17', 47'; Jörgensen (yellow card) 60'; Mosquera (yellow card) 62'; Albiol (yellow card) 63'; Cuenca (yellow card) 88'; Sørloth 90+5' | Stadium: Reale Arena; Attendance: 30,609; Referee: Javier Iglesias Villanueva |

| 3 March 2024 27 | Villarreal | 5–1 | Granada | Villarreal |
| 14:00 CET (UTC+1) | Sørloth 7', 19', 66'; Capoue 32', (yellow card) 84'; Guedes 47' | Report | Piątkowski (yellow card) 15'; Sánchez (yellow card) 70'; Corbeanu 90+1' | Stadium: Estadio de la Cerámica; Attendance: 15,896; Referee: Juan Luis Pulido Santana |

| 10 March 2024 28 | Real Betis | 2–3 | Villarreal | Seville |
| 21:00 CET (UTC+1) | Rodríguez 30'; Willian José 45+2'; Ávila (yellow card) 69' (yellow-red card) 70'; Cardoso (yellow card) 90+1' | Report | Traoré (yellow card) 29'; Sørloth 40'; Papastathopoulos 48' (o.g.); Baena 67'; Moreno (yellow card) 69' (yellow-red card) 70'; Jörgensen (yellow card) 78' | Stadium: Benito Villamarín; Attendance: 47,711; Referee: Alejandro Hernández Hernández |

| 17 March 2024 29 | Villarreal | 1–0 | Valencia | Villarreal |
| 16:15 CET (UTC+1) | Femenía (yellow card) 12'; Coquelin (yellow card) 35'; Baena (penalty missed) 39', (yellow card) 41'; Cuenca (yellow card) 52', (goal) 54'; Mandi (yellow card) 70' | Report | Gayà (yellow card) 36' | Stadium: Estadio de la Cerámica; Attendance: 20,647; Referee: Jorge Figueroa Vázquez |

| 1 April 2024 30 | Villarreal | 1–2 | Atlético Madrid | Villarreal |
| 21:00 CEST (UTC+2) | Capoue (yellow card) 27'; Sørloth 50'; Parejo (yellow card) 58'; Mosquera (yellow card) 90+4' | Report | Witsel 9'; Griezmann (yellow card) 26'; Barrios (yellow card) 62'; Saúl 87', (yellow card) 90+2' | Stadium: Estadio de la Cerámica; Attendance: 19,679; Referee: Mario Melero López |

| 14 April 2024 31 | Athletic Bilbao | 1–1 | Villarreal | Bilbao |
| 18:30 CEST (UTC+2) | Prados (yellow card) 11'; I. Williams (yellow card) 31'; Sancet 66'; Berchiche (yellow card) 90+4' | Report | Gerard (penalty missed) 11'; Comesaña (yellow card) 35' (yellow-red card) 46'; Albiol (yellow card) 35'; Parejo 90+5' (pen.) | Stadium: San Mamés; Attendance: 50,061; Referee: Guillermo Cuadra Fernández |

| 21 April 2024 32 | Almería | 1–2 | Villarreal | Almería |
| 16:15 CEST (UTC+2) | Lozano 30'; Viera (yellow card) 73'; Ramazani (yellow card) 80' (yellow-red card) 87' | Report | Akhomach 25', (yellow card) 50'; Coquelin (yellow card) 59'; Jörgensen (yellow card) 62'; Femenía (yellow card) 88'; Sørloth 90+2' | Stadium: Power Horse Stadium; Attendance: 10,601; Referee: Miguel Ángel Ortiz Arias |

| 28 April 2024 33 | Villarreal | 3–0 | Rayo Vallecano | Villarreal |
| 18:30 CEST (UTC+2) | Sørloth 18', 74'; Mosquera 69'; Coquelin (yellow card) 77'; Albiol (yellow card) 90' | Report | Ciss (yellow card) 78' | Stadium: Estadio de la Cerámica; Attendance: 17,869; Referee: Pablo González Fuertes |

| 5 May 2024 34 | Celta Vigo | 3–2 | Villarreal | Vigo |
| 16:15 CEST (UTC+2) | Aspas 22' (pen.); Manquillo (yellow card) 25'; Rodríguez (yellow card) 33'; Larsen 39'; Swedberg (yellow card) 64'; Douvikas 82', (yellow card) 85' | Report | Moreno 12'; Comesaña (red card) 17'; Guedes 65' | Stadium: Balaídos; Attendance: 19,548; Referee: César Soto Grado |

| 11 May 2024 35 | Villarreal | 3–2 | Sevilla | Villarreal |
| 16:15 CEST (UTC+2) | Sørloth 30', 90+7'; Cuenca (yellow card) 63'; Reina (yellow card) 76'; Mosquera 84'; Bailly (yellow card) 88' | Report | Nianzou (yellow card) 17'; En-Nesyri 26' (pen.), 44'; Ocampos (yellow card) 70'; Salas (yellow card) 88'; Agoumé (yellow card) 90+5'; Ramos (yellow card) 90+7' | Stadium: Estadio de la Cerámica; Attendance: 16,862; Referee: Isidro Díaz de Mera Escuderos |

| 14 May 2024 36 | Girona | 0–1 | Villarreal | Girona |
| 22:00 CEST (UTC+2) | Blind (yellow card) 36' | Report | Femenía (yellow card) 41' (yellow-red card) 90+5'; Baena (yellow card) 43'; Traoré (yellow card) 56', (goal) 59'; Terrats (yellow card) 90+3' | Stadium: Montilivi; Attendance: 11,440; Referee: José María Sánchez Martínez |

| 19 May 2024 37 | Villarreal | 4–4 | Real Madrid | Villarreal |
| 19:00 CEST (UTC+2) | Sørloth 39', 48', 52', 56'; Moreno (yellow card) 45+5'; Traoré (yellow card) 84' | Report | Güler 14', 45+2'; Joselu 30'; Vázquez 40'; Camavinga (yellow card) 66'; Ceballos (yellow card) 86' | Stadium: Estadio de la Cerámica; Attendance: 21,671; Referee: Alejandro Hernández Hernández |

| 25 May 2024 38 | Osasuna | 1–1 | Villarreal | Pamplona |
| 14:00 CEST (UTC+2) | Budimir 30'; Muñoz (yellow card) 34'; Peña (yellow card) 82'; Arnaiz (yellow card) 88'; U. García (yellow card) 89' | Report | Baena (yellow card) 10'; Traoré (yellow card) 40'; Morales 57'; Mosquera (yellow card) 88' | Stadium: El Sadar; Attendance: 18,385; Referee: Mario Melero López |

=== Copa del Rey ===
| 2 November 2023 First round | Chiclana | 0–5 | Villarreal | Chiclana de la Frontera |
| 19:00 CET (UTC+1) | Butrón (yellow card) 29' | Report | Trigueros 19', 43', 72' (pen.); Pascual 31'; Baena 74' | Stadium: Estadio Municipal; Attendance: 5,520; Referee: Juan Luis Pulido Santana |

| 22 November 2023 Second round | Zamora | 1–2 (a.e.t.) | Villarreal | Zamora |
| 21:00 CET (UTC+1) | Etxaburu 49', (yellow card) 105+1'; Bolo (yellow card) 93'; Morales (yellow card) 111' | Report | Baena (yellow card) 78'; Morales 88', 96'; Reina (yellow card) 120' | Stadium: Ruta de la Plata; Attendance: 4,600; Referee: Miguel Ángel Ortiz Arias |

| 8 January 2024 Round of 32 | Unionistas | 1–1 (a.e.t.) (7–6 p) | Villarreal | Salamanca |
| 16:30 CET (UTC+1) | Camus (yellow card) 10'; Jiménez (yellow card) 62'; Planas 87' (pen.); Mayor (yellow card) 110' | Report | Parejo (yellow card) 14'; Cuenca (yellow card) 73'; Akhomach 82'; Comesaña (yellow card) 86'; Sørloth (yellow card) 89'; Terrats (yellow card) 100'; Coquelin (yellow card) 108' | Stadium: Reina Sofía; Attendance: 5,710; Referee: Mateo Busquets Ferrer |
| | Penalties |
| | Mayor (penalty scored); Héctor (penalty scored); Ruiz (penalty scored); Planas (penalty missed); Ramírez (penalty scored); Al. Gómez (penalty scored); Giménez (penalty scored); Ad. Gómez (penalty scored) | | (penalty scored) Gerard; (penalty missed) Moreno; (penalty scored) Coquelin; (penalty scored) Trigueros; (penalty scored) Sørloth; (penalty scored) Terrats; (penalty scored) Comesaña; (penalty missed) Femenía |
Note: The match was originally played on 7 January 2024, but was suspended and postponed until the following day at the beginning of extra time due to lighting problems in the stadium.

=== UEFA Europa League ===
==== Group stage ====
The draw for the group stage was held on 1 September 2023.

| Pos | Team | Pld | W | D | L | GF | GA | GD | Pts | Qualification | VIL | REN | MHA | PAO |
|---|---|---|---|---|---|---|---|---|---|---|---|---|---|---|
| 1 | (Spain) Villarreal | 6 | 4 | 1 | 1 | 9 | 7 | +2 | 13 | Advance to round of 16 | — | 1–0 | 0–0 | 3–2 |
| 2 | (France) Rennes | 6 | 4 | 0 | 2 | 13 | 6 | +7 | 12 | Advance to knockout round play-offs | 2–3 | — | 3–0 | 3–1 |
| 3 | (Israel) Maccabi Haifa | 6 | 1 | 2 | 3 | 3 | 9 | −6 | 5 | Transfer to Europa Conference League | 1–2 | 0–3 | — | 0–0 |
| 4 | (Greece) Panathinaikos | 6 | 1 | 1 | 4 | 7 | 10 | −3 | 4 | | 2–0 | 1–2 | 1–2 | — |

Source: UEFA
Rules for classification: Group stage tiebreakers

| 21 September 2023 1 | Panathinaikos (Greece) | 2–0 | (Spain) Villarreal | Athens, Greece |
| 19:45 EEST (UTC+3) | Ioannidis 38'; Šporar 78'; Cantalapiedra (yellow card) 89' | Report | Femenía (yellow card) 64'; Sørloth (yellow card) 74'; Baena (yellow card) 84'; Pedraza (yellow card) 87' | Stadium: Olympic Stadium; Attendance: 57,003; Referee: Craig Pawson (England) |
Note: The match was played at the Olympic Stadium in Athens, instead of Panathinaikos' regular stadium, the Leoforos Alexandras Stadium.

| 5 October 2023 2 | Villarreal (Spain) | 1–0 | (France) Rennes | Villarreal |
| 21:00 CEST (UTC+2) | Sørloth 36'; Pino (yellow card) 43'; Moreno (yellow card) 50'; Baena (yellow card) 54'; Pedraza (yellow card) 87' | Report | D. Doué (yellow card) 27'; Truffert (yellow card) 58'; Terrier (penalty missed) 90+2' | Stadium: Estadio de la Cerámica; Attendance: 17,458; Referee: Harald Lechner (Austria) |

| 9 November 2023 4 | Maccabi Haifa (Israel) | 1–2 | (Spain) Villarreal | Larnaca, Cyprus |
| 19:45 EET (UTC+2) | Seck 30'; Šimić (yellow card) 38'; Refaelov (yellow card) 71'; Cafumana (yellow card) 85' | Report | Sørloth (yellow card) 29', (goal) 86'; Trigueros (penalty missed) 38'; Altimira (yellow card) 69'; Moreno (yellow card) 75'; Baena 82' | Stadium: AEK Arena; Attendance: 0 Referee: Mykola Balakin (Ukraine) |
Note: The match was played behind closed doors at a neutral venue, the AEK Arena in Larnaca, Cyprus, instead of Maccabi Haifa's regular stadium, the Sammy Ofer Stadium in Haifa, Israel, as a result of the Gaza war.

| 30 November 2023 5 | Villarreal (Spain) | 3–2 | (Greece) Panathinaikos | Villarreal |
| 21:00 CET (UTC+1) | Baena 29'; Comesaña 34', (yellow card) 88'; Morales 47'; Akhomach (yellow card) 71' | Report | Ioannidis (penalty missed) 66', 81'; Palacios 66'; Pérez (yellow card) 90+8' | Stadium: Estadio de la Cerámica; Attendance: 16,993; Referee: Ivan Kružliak (Slovakia) |

| 6 December 2023 3 | Villarreal (Spain) | 0–0 | (Israel) Maccabi Haifa | Villarreal |
| 21:00 CET (UTC+1) | Capoue (yellow card) 36'; Foyth (yellow card) 45+1'; Pedraza (yellow card) 62' | Report | Refaelov (yellow card) 79'; Naor (yellow card) 90+2' | Stadium: Estadio de la Cerámica; Attendance: 9,365; Referee: Nick Walsh (Scotland) |
Note: The match was originally scheduled for 26 October 2023, but was postponed due to the Gaza war.

| 14 December 2023 6 | Rennes (France) | 2–3 | (Spain) Villarreal | Rennes, France |
| 18:45 CET (UTC+1) | Wooh (yellow card) 9'; Bourigeaud (yellow card) 23'; Belocian (yellow card) 34'; Assignon 37'; Mandanda (yellow card) 45+1'; Blas 79' | Report | Albiol (yellow card) 19'; Gerard 36' (pen.), (yellow card) 36'; Akhomach 62'; Parejo 80', (yellow card) 90+1' | Stadium: Roazhon Park; Attendance: 27,761; Referee: Atilla Karaoğlan (Turkey) |

==== Knockout phase ====
===== Round of 16 =====
The draw for the round of 16 was held on 23 February 2024.

| 7 March 2024 First leg | Marseille (France) | 4–0 | (Spain) Villarreal | Marseille, France |
| 21:00 CET (UTC+1) | Merlin (yellow card) 13'; Veretout 23'; Mosquera 28' (o.g.); Aubameyang 42' (pen.), 59' | Report | Mandi (yellow card) 9'; Comesaña (yellow card) 45+1'; Moreno (yellow card) 52' (yellow-red card) 62'; Cuenca (yellow card) 72' | Stadium: Stade Vélodrome; Attendance: 53,396; Referee: Serdar Gözübüyük (Netherlands) |

| 14 March 2024 Second leg | Villarreal (Spain) | 3–1 (3–5 agg.) | (France) Marseille | Villarreal |
| 18:45 CET (UTC+1) | Coquelin (yellow card) 19'; Capoue 32'; Sørloth 54'; Mosquera 86', (yellow card) 90+2'; Baena (yellow card) 90+2' | Report | Sarr (yellow card) 19'; Ounahi (yellow card) 48'; Merlin (yellow card) 69'; Kondogbia (yellow card) 85'; López (yellow card) 90+3'; Clauss 90+4' | Stadium: Estadio de la Cerámica; Attendance: 15,378; Referee: István Kovács (Romania) |

== Statistics ==
=== Squad statistics ===
Last updated 1 April 2024.

| No. | Pos | Nat | Player | Total | | La Liga | | Copa del Rey | | UEFA Europa League | |
| No. | Pos | Nat | Player | Apps | Goals | Apps | Goals | Apps | Goals | Apps | Goals |
Goalkeepers
| 1 | GK | (Spain) ESP | Pepe Reina | 11 | 0 | 1 | 0 | 3 | 0 | 7 | 0 |
| 13 | GK | (Denmark) DEN | Filip Jörgensen | 30 | 0 | 29 | 0 | 0 | 0 | 1 | 0 |
Defenders
| 2 | DF | (Colombia) COL | Yerson Mosquera | 10 | 1 | 6+2 | 0 | 0 | 0 | 1+1 | 1 |
| 3 | DF | (Spain) ESP | Raúl Albiol | 26 | 0 | 21+1 | 0 | 1 | 0 | 2+1 | 0 |
| 5 | DF | (Spain) ESP | Jorge Cuenca | 28 | 3 | 17+6 | 3 | 0 | 0 | 4+1 | 0 |
| 8 | DF | (Argentina) ARG | Juan Foyth | 16 | 1 | 12 | 1 | 0+1 | 0 | 3 | 0 |
| 12 | DF | (Ivory Coast) CIV | Eric Bailly | 10 | 0 | 6+1 | 0 | 1 | 0 | 2 | 0 |
| 17 | DF | (Spain) ESP | Kiko Femenía | 23 | 0 | 9+7 | 0 | 2+1 | 0 | 3+1 | 0 |
| 18 | DF | (Spain) ESP | Alberto Moreno | 29 | 1 | 13+9 | 1 | 2+1 | 0 | 3+1 | 0 |
| 23 | DF | (Algeria) ALG | Aïssa Mandi | 20 | 1 | 10+4 | 1 | 1 | 0 | 5 | 0 |
| 24 | DF | (Spain) ESP | Alfonso Pedraza | 20 | 1 | 13+2 | 1 | 1 | 0 | 1+3 | 0 |
| 26 | DF | (Spain) ESP | Adrià Altimira | 18 | 0 | 10+1 | 0 | 2+1 | 0 | 3+1 | 0 |
| 37 | DF | (Spain) ESP | Carlos Romero | 8 | 0 | 2+5 | 0 | 1 | 0 | 0 | 0 |
| 42 | DF | (Serbia) SRB | Stefan Leković | 2 | 0 | 0+1 | 0 | 0+1 | 0 | 0 | 0 |
Midfielders
| 4 | DF | (Spain) ESP | Santi Comesaña | 31 | 3 | 14+7 | 2 | 3 | 0 | 5+2 | 1 |
| 6 | MF | (France) FRA | Étienne Capoue | 36 | 2 | 15+13 | 1 | 0+1 | 0 | 5+2 | 1 |
| 10 | MF | (Spain) ESP | Dani Parejo | 34 | 3 | 22+3 | 2 | 2 | 0 | 4+3 | 1 |
| 14 | MF | (Spain) ESP | Manu Trigueros | 19 | 3 | 1+10 | 0 | 2+1 | 3 | 5 | 0 |
| 16 | MF | (Spain) ESP | Álex Baena | 38 | 5 | 26+1 | 2 | 1+2 | 1 | 5+3 | 2 |
| 19 | MF | (France) FRA | Francis Coquelin | 17 | 0 | 8+4 | 0 | 0+1 | 0 | 2+2 | 0 |
| 20 | MF | (Spain) ESP | Ramon Terrats | 19 | 0 | 5+9 | 0 | 1+1 | 0 | 1+2 | 0 |
| 22 | MF | (Spain) ESP | Denis Suárez | 6 | 0 | 1+3 | 0 | 0 | 0 | 1+1 | 0 |
Forwards
| 7 | FW | (Spain) ESP | Gerard Moreno | 35 | 11 | 25+2 | 10 | 1+1 | 0 | 3+3 | 1 |
| 9 | FW | (Portugal) POR | Gonçalo Guedes | 12 | 2 | 4+5 | 2 | 1 | 0 | 2 | 0 |
| 11 | FW | (Norway) NOR | Alexander Sørloth | 33 | 17 | 22+4 | 14 | 0+1 | 0 | 4+2 | 3 |
| 15 | FW | (Spain) ESP | José Luis Morales | 32 | 9 | 8+15 | 6 | 2+1 | 2 | 2+4 | 1 |
| 21 | FW | (Spain) ESP | Yeremy Pino | 10 | 0 | 7 | 0 | 0 | 0 | 2+1 | 0 |
| 25 | FW | (Burkina Faso) BFA | Bertrand Traoré | 5 | 0 | 3+2 | 0 | 0 | 0 | 0 | 0 |
| 27 | FW | (Morocco) MAR | Ilias Akhomach | 31 | 3 | 12+11 | 1 | 2+1 | 1 | 5 | 1 |
| 30 | FW | (Spain) ESP | Jorge Pascual | 5 | 1 | 0+1 | 0 | 1+1 | 1 | 0+2 | 0 |
| 43 | FW | (Spain) ESP | Diego Collado | 1 | 0 | 0 | 0 | 0+1 | 0 | 0 | 0 |
Players transferred out during the season
| 2 | DF | (Italy) ITA | Matteo Gabbia | 13 | 0 | 6+1 | 0 | 0 | 0 | 5+1 | 0 |
| 9 | FW | (Chile) CHI | Ben Brereton Díaz | 20 | 0 | 2+12 | 0 | 1 | 0 | 3+2 | 0 |

=== Goalscorers ===
| Position | Players | LaLiga | Copa del Rey | Europa League | Total |
|---|---|---|---|---|---|
| FW | (Norway) Alexander Sørloth | 23 | 0 | 3 | 26 |
| FW | (Spain) Gerard Moreno | 10 | 0 | 1 | 11 |
| FW | (Spain) José Luis Morales | 7 | 2 | 1 | 10 |
| MF | (Spain) Álex Baena | 2 | 1 | 2 | 5 |
| FW | (Morocco) Ilias Akhomach | 2 | 1 | 1 | 4 |
| MF | (Spain) Dani Parejo | 3 | 0 | 1 | 4 |
| DF | (Spain) Jorge Cuenca | 3 | 0 | 0 | 3 |
| FW | (Portugal) Gonçalo Guedes | 3 | 0 | 0 | 3 |
| MF | (Spain) Manu Trigueros | 0 | 3 | 0 | 3 |
| MF | (Spain) Santi Comesaña | 2 | 0 | 1 | 3 |
| DF | (Colombia) Yerson Mosquera | 2 | 0 | 1 | 3 |
| MF | (France) Étienne Capoue | 1 | 0 | 1 | 2 |
| DF | (Spain) Alberto Moreno | 2 | 0 | 0 | 2 |
| DF | (Argentina) Juan Foyth | 1 | 0 | 0 | 1 |
| DF | (Algeria) Aïssa Mandi | 1 | 0 | 0 | 1 |
| FW | (Spain) Jorge Pascual | 0 | 1 | 0 | 1 |
| MF | (Spain) Alfonso Pedraza | 1 | 0 | 0 | 1 |
| MF | (Burkina Faso) Bertrand Traoré | 1 | 0 | 0 | 1 |
