= 2021–22 Villarreal CF season =

Villarreal
2021–22 season
- President: Fernando Roig
- Head coach: Unai Emery
- Stadium: Estadio de la Cerámica
- La Liga: 7th
- Copa del Rey: Round of 32
- UEFA Champions League: Semi-finals
- UEFA Super Cup: Runners-up
- Top goalscorer: League: Arnaut Danjuma (10); All: Arnaut Danjuma (16)
- Highest home attendance: 16,719 vs Real Betis (3 October 2021)
- Lowest home attendance: 7,837 vs Granada (16 August 2021)
- Biggest win: Victoria 0–8 Villarreal
- Biggest defeat: Villarreal 1–3 Barcelona
| Home colours | Away colours | Third colours |

The 2021–22 season was the 99th season in the existence of Villarreal CF and the club's ninth consecutive season in the top flight of Spanish football. In addition to the domestic league, Villarreal participated in this season's editions of the Copa del Rey, the UEFA Champions League, and the UEFA Super Cup.

== Players ==
As of 1 February 2022

Note: Flags indicate national team as defined under FIFA eligibility rules; some limited exceptions apply. Players may hold more than one non-FIFA nationality.

| No. | Pos. | Nation | Player |
|---|---|---|---|
| 1 | GK | ESP | Sergio Asenjo |
| 2 | DF | ESP | Mario Gaspar (captain) |
| 3 | DF | ESP | Raúl Albiol (3rd captain) |
| 4 | DF | ESP | Pau Torres |
| 5 | MF | ESP | Dani Parejo |
| 6 | MF | FRA | Étienne Capoue |
| 7 | FW | ESP | Gerard Moreno |
| 8 | DF | ARG | Juan Foyth |
| 9 | FW | ESP | Paco Alcácer |
| 10 | MF | ESP | Vicente Iborra (vice-captain) |
| 11 | FW | NGR | Samuel Chukwueze |
| 12 | DF | ECU | Pervis Estupiñán |
| 13 | GK | ARG | Gerónimo Rulli |

| No. | Pos. | Nation | Player |
|---|---|---|---|
| 14 | MF | ESP | Manu Trigueros (4th captain) |
| 15 | FW | NED | Arnaut Danjuma |
| 16 | FW | SEN | Boulaye Dia |
| 17 | MF | ARG | Giovani Lo Celso (on loan from Tottenham) |
| 18 | DF | ESP | Alberto Moreno |
| 19 | MF | FRA | Francis Coquelin |
| 20 | DF | ESP | Rubén Peña |
| 21 | MF | ESP | Yeremy Pino |
| 22 | DF | ALG | Aïssa Mandi |
| 23 | MF | ESP | Moi Gómez |
| 24 | DF | ESP | Alfonso Pedraza |
| 25 | DF | CIV | Serge Aurier |

=== Reserve team ===
Note: Flags indicate national team as defined under FIFA eligibility rules; some limited exceptions apply. Players may hold more than one non-FIFA nationality.

| No. | Pos. | Nation | Player |
|---|---|---|---|
| 26 | FW | SEN | Nicolas Jackson |
| 27 | DF | ESP | Adrián de la Fuente |
| 28 | MF | RUS | Nikita Iosifov |
| 31 | GK | AND | Iker Álvarez |
| 32 | DF | ESP | Lanchi |

| No. | Pos. | Nation | Player |
|---|---|---|---|
| 35 | GK | DEN | Filip Jörgensen |
| 37 | DF | ESP | Dani Tasende |
| 38 | MF | ESP | Carlo Adriano |
| 39 | MF | ESP | Antonio Pacheco |

=== Out on loan ===
Note: Flags indicate national team as defined under FIFA eligibility rules; some limited exceptions apply. Players may hold more than one non-FIFA nationality.

| No. | Pos. | Nation | Player |
|---|---|---|---|
| — | DF | ESP | Jorge Cuenca (at Getafe until 30 June 2022) |
| — | DF | ESP | Xavi Quintillà (at Leganés until 30 June 2022) |
| — | MF | ESP | Álex Baena (at Girona until 30 June 2022) |
| — | MF | ESP | Iván Martín (at Girona until 30 June 2022) |

| No. | Pos. | Nation | Player |
|---|---|---|---|
| — | MF | ESP | Manu Morlanes (at Espanyol until 30 June 2022) |
| — | FW | ESP | Álex Millán (at Union SG until 30 June 2022) |
| — | FW | ESP | Fer Niño (at Mallorca until 30 June 2022) |
| — | FW | FRA | Haissem Hassan (at Mirandés until 30 June 2022) |

== Transfers ==
=== In ===
| Date | Player | From | Type | Fee | Ref. |
|---|---|---|---|---|---|
| 30 June 2021 | (Morocco) Sofian Chakla | Getafe | Loan return | | |
| 30 June 2021 | (Spain) Jorge Cuenca | Almería | Loan return | | |
| 30 June 2021 | (Spain) Enric Franquesa | Girona | Loan return | | |
| 30 June 2021 | (Spain) Miguel Ángel Leal | (Netherlands) Groningen | Loan return | | |
| 30 June 2021 | (Spain) Mario González | (Portugal) Tondela | Loan return | | |
| 30 June 2021 | (Spain) Iván Martín | Mirandés | Loan return | | |
| 30 June 2021 | (Spain) Manu Morlanes | Almería | Loan return | | |
| 30 June 2021 | (Spain) Javier Ontiveros | Huesca | Loan return | | |
| 30 June 2021 | (Spain) Xavi Quintillà | (England) Norwich City | Loan return | | |
| 1 July 2021 | (Argentina) Juan Foyth | (England) Tottenham Hotspur | Buyout clause | €15M | |
| 1 July 2021 | (Algeria) Aïssa Mandi | Real Betis | Transfer | Free | |
| 7 July 2021 | (Spain) Manu Morlanes | Almería | Transfer | Undisclosed | |
| 13 July 2021 | (Senegal) Boulaye Dia | (France) Reims | Transfer | Undisclosed | |
| 19 August 2021 | (Netherlands) Arnaut Danjuma | (England) Bournemouth | Transfer | €25M | |
| 4 October 2021 | (Ivory Coast) Serge Aurier | Free agent | Transfer | Free | |
| 31 January 2022 | (Argentina) Giovani Lo Celso | (England) Tottenham Hotspur | Loan | | |

=== Out ===
| Date | Player | To | Type | Fee | Ref. |
|---|---|---|---|---|---|
| 1 July 2021 | (Spain) Miguelón | Espanyol | Buyout clause | €500K | |
| 2 July 2021 | (Spain) Enric Franquesa | Levante | Transfer | Undisclosed | |
| 7 July 2021 | (Spain) Jaume Costa | Mallorca | Transfer | Free | |
| 7 July 2021 | (Spain) Manu Morlanes | Almería | Transfer | Undisclosed | |
| 10 July 2021 | (Spain) Iván Martín | Alavés | Loan | | |
| 13 July 2021 | (Colombia) Carlos Bacca | Granada | Transfer | Free | |
| 23 July 2021 | (Argentina) Ramiro Funes Mori | (Saudi Arabia) Al Nassr | Transfer | €2.5M | |
| 4 August 2021 | (Romania) Andrei Rațiu | Huesca | Transfer | | |
| 13 August 2021 | (Spain) Álex Millán | (Belgium) Cercle Brugge | Loan | | |
| 16 August 2021 | (Spain) Manu Morlanes | Espanyol | Loan | | |
| 18 August 2021 | (Spain) Fer Niño | Mallorca | Loan | | |
| 19 August 2021 | (Spain) Álex Baena | Girona | Loan | | |
| 27 August 2021 | (Spain) Javier Ontiveros | Osasuna | Loan | | |
| 27 August 2021 | (Morocco) Sofian Chakla | (Belgium) OH Leuven | Loan | | |
| 30 August 2021 | (Spain) Jorge Cuenca | Getafe | Loan | | |
| 31 January 2022 | (Spain) Dani Raba | Granada | Released | | |

== Pre-season and friendlies ==
Win Draw Loss

| 16 July 2021 Friendly | Valencia | 3–2 | Villarreal | Oliva, Spain |
| 18:30 CEST (UTC+2) | Guillamón (yellow card) 24'; Alderete (yellow card) 44'; Vallejo 68', 86' (pen.); Cheryshev 90+4' | Report | Moreno 45'; Cuenca (yellow card) 63', (goal) 67' | Stadium: Oliva Nova Beach & Golf Resort; Attendance: 0 Referee: Juan Manuel Gordillo Escamilla |

| 22 July 2021 Friendly | Villarreal | 2–2 | Lyon | San Pedro del Pinatar, Spain |
| 20:00 CEST (UTC+2) | Gómez 23'; Dia 38'; Pedraza (yellow card) 43'; Morlanes (yellow card) 64' | Report | Jean Lucas 8'; Aouar 44' | Stadium: Pinatar Arena Football Center; Attendance: 0 Referee: Juan Antonio Campos Salinas |

| 24 July 2021 Friendly | Honvéd | Cancelled | Villarreal | Budapest, Hungary |
| 20:00 CEST (UTC+2) | | | | Stadium: Bozsik Aréna |
Note: The match was cancelled due to the detection of COVID-19 cases among Villarreal.

| 26 July 2021 Friendly | Dynamo Kyiv | Cancelled | Villarreal | Austria |
| 16:30 CEST (UTC+2) |
Note: The match was cancelled due to the detection of COVID-19 cases among Villarreal.

| 28 July 2021 Friendly | Hertha BSC | Cancelled | Villarreal | Zell am See, Austria |
| 18:15 CEST (UTC+2) | | | | Stadium: Alois Latini Stadion |
Note: The match was cancelled due to the detection of COVID-19 cases among Villarreal.

| 29 July 2021 Friendly | Villarreal | 0–0 | Levante | Villarreal, Spain |
| 19:00 CEST (UTC+2) | Baena (yellow card) 74' | Report | Soldado (yellow card) 43'; Martínez (yellow card) 53' | Stadium: Ciudad Deportiva; Referee: Iván Caparrós Hernández |

| 31 July 2021 Friendly | Marseille | 2–1 | Villarreal | Marseille, France |
| 21:00 CEST (UTC+2) | Niño 9' (o.g.); Balerdi (yellow card) 52'; Payet 58'; Gueye (yellow card) 68' | Report | Foyth (yellow card) 45' (yellow-red card) 49'; Moreno 88' | Stadium: Stade Vélodrome; Attendance: 30,000; Referee: Pierre Gaillouste |

| 4 August 2021 Friendly | Leicester City | 3–2 | Villarreal | Leicester, England |
| 19:45 BST (UTC+1) | Söyüncü 40'; Barnes 42'; Pérez 51' | Report | Niño 76'; Millán 83' | Stadium: King Power Stadium; Referee: Matt Donohue |

| 7 August 2021 Friendly | Leeds United | 2–2 | Villarreal | York |
| 20:00 CEST (UTC+2) | Klich 9'; Bamford 39' | Report | Moreno 1'; Raba 80' | Attendance: 0 Referee: Tony Harrington |

| 3 September 2021 Friendly | Villarreal | 2–3 | Braga | Villarreal, Spain |
| 20:00 CEST (UTC+2) | Gómez 51'; Raba 55' | Report | Oliveira 8'; Galeno 25'; Fabiano (red card) 32'; Medeiros 72' | Stadium: Estadio de la Cerámica |

== Competitions ==
=== Overall record ===
| Competition | First match | Last match | Starting round | Final position | Record | | | | | | | |
| Competition | First match | Last match | Starting round | Final position | Pld | W | D | L | GF | GA | GD | Win % |
|---|---|---|---|---|---|---|---|---|---|---|---|---|
| La Liga | 16 August 2021 | 22 May 2022 | Matchday 1 | 7th | 38 | 16 | 11 | 11 | 63 | 37 | +26 | 42.11 |
| Copa del Rey | 30 November 2021 | 6 January 2022 | First round | Round of 32 | 3 | 2 | 0 | 1 | 16 | 3 | +13 | 66.67 |
| UEFA Champions League | 14 September 2021 | 3 May 2022 | Group stage | Semi-finals | 12 | 5 | 3 | 4 | 20 | 17 | +3 | 41.67 |
| UEFA Super Cup | 11 August 2021 | | Final | Runners-up | 1 | 0 | 1 | 0 | 1 | 1 | +0 | 0.00 |
| Total | | | | | 54 | 23 | 15 | 16 | 100 | 58 | +42 | 42.59 |

Source: Soccerway

=== La Liga ===
==== League table ====
| Pos | Team | Pld | W | D | L | GF | GA | GD | Pts | Qualification or relegation |
|---|---|---|---|---|---|---|---|---|---|---|
| 5 | Real Betis | 38 | 19 | 8 | 11 | 62 | 40 | +22 | 65 | Qualification for the Europa League group stage (Note: Since the winners of the 2021–22 Copa del Rey, Real Betis, qualified for European competition based on league position, the Europa League berth awarded to the Copa del Rey winners was passed to the sixth-placed team, and the Europa Conference League berth awarded to the sixth-placed team was passed to the seventh-placed team.) |
| 6 | Real Sociedad | 38 | 17 | 11 | 10 | 40 | 37 | +3 | 62 | Qualification for the Europa League group stage |
| 7 | Villarreal | 38 | 16 | 11 | 11 | 63 | 37 | +26 | 59 | Qualification for the Europa Conference League play-off round |
| 8 | Athletic Bilbao | 38 | 14 | 13 | 11 | 43 | 36 | +7 | 55 | |
| 9 | Valencia | 38 | 11 | 15 | 12 | 48 | 53 | −5 | 48 | |

Source: LaLiga Santander
Rules for classification: 1) Points; 2) Head-to-head points; 3) Head-to-head goal difference; 4) Goal difference; 5) Goals scored; 6) Fair-play points (Note: Head-to-head record is used only after all the matches between the teams in question have been played)

==== Results summary ====
| Overall | | | | | | | | Home | | | | | | Away | | | | | |
| Pld | W | D | L | GF | GA | GD | Pts | W | D | L | GF | GA | GD | W | D | L | GF | GA | GD |
|---|---|---|---|---|---|---|---|---|---|---|---|---|---|---|---|---|---|---|---|
| 38 | 16 | 11 | 11 | 63 | 37 | +26 | 59 | 10 | 6 | 3 | 40 | 18 | +22 | 6 | 5 | 8 | 23 | 19 | +4 |

Source: La Liga

==== Results by round ====
| Round | 1 | 2 | 3 | 4 | 5 | 6 | 7 | 8 | 9 | 10 | 11 | 12 | 13 | 14 | 15 | 16 | 17 | 18 | 19 | 20 | 21 | 22 | 23 | 24 | 25 | 26 | 27 | 28 | 29 | 30 | 31 | 32 | 33 | 34 | 35 | 36 | 37 | 38 |
|---|---|---|---|---|---|---|---|---|---|---|---|---|---|---|---|---|---|---|---|---|---|---|---|---|---|---|---|---|---|---|---|---|---|---|---|---|---|---|
| Ground | H | A | A | H | A | H | A | H | H | A | H | A | H | A | H | A | H | A | H | H | A | H | A | H | A | H | A | H | A | A | H | A | H | A | H | A | H | A |
| Result | D | D | D | W | D | W | D | W | L | L | D | L | W | D | L | L | W | W | W | D | L | W | W | D | W | W | L | W | L | L | D | W | W | L | D | W | L | W |
| Position | 13 | 15 | 11 | 14 | 14 | 12 | 11 | 11 | 12 | 13 | 13 | 13 | 12 | 12 | 12 | 13 | 11 | 9 | 8 | 8 | 8 | 7 | 6 | 7 | 6 | 7 | 7 | 7 | 7 | 7 | 7 | 7 | 7 | 7 | 7 | 7 | 7 | 7 |

Source: La Liga
A = Away; H = Home; W = Win; D = Draw; L = Loss

==== Matches ====
The league fixtures were announced on 30 June 2021.

| 16 August 2021 1 | Villarreal | 0–0 | Granada | Villarreal |
| 20:00 CEST (UTC+2) | Foyth (yellow card) 21' (yellow-red card) 82'; Gerard (yellow card) 41'; Capoue (yellow card) 53'; Peña (yellow card) 85' | Report | Germán (yellow card) 71' | Stadium: Estadio de la Cerámica; Attendance: 7,837; Referee: Pablo González Fuertes |
Note: Juan Foyth's first yellow card was overturned after Villarreal successfully appealed the decision.

| 21 August 2021 2 | Espanyol | 0–0 | Villarreal | Cornellà de Llobregat |
| 19:30 CEST (UTC+2) | De Tomás (yellow card) 41'; Gil (yellow card) 60'; Bare (yellow card) 90+2' | Report | Capoue (yellow card) 23'; Gómez (yellow card) 30'; Moreno (yellow card) 36'; Mandi (yellow card) 54' | Stadium: RCDE Stadium; Attendance: 0 Referee: Jorge Figueroa Vázquez |

| 29 August 2021 3 | Atlético Madrid | 2–2 | Villarreal | Madrid |
| 22:00 CEST (UTC+2) | Correa (yellow card) 28'; Lemar (yellow card) 45'; Suárez 56', (yellow card) 59'; De Paul (yellow card) 85'; Mandi 90+5' (o.g.) | Report | Trigueros 52'; Gerard (yellow card) 61'; Danjuma 74'; Rulli (yellow card) 85' | Stadium: Wanda Metropolitano; Attendance: 26,840; Referee: César Soto Grado |

| 19 September 2021 5 | Mallorca | 0–0 | Villarreal | Palma |
| 14:00 CEST (UTC+2) | Sastre (yellow card) 41'; Ndiaye (yellow card) 53' | Report | Dia (yellow card) 54'; Pino (yellow card) 59'; Albiol (yellow card) 84' | Stadium: Visit Mallorca Stadium; Attendance: 9,168; Referee: Carlos del Cerro Grande |

| 22 September 2021 6 | Villarreal | 4–1 | Elche | Villarreal |
| 22:00 CEST (UTC+2) | Pino 5'; Pedraza (yellow card) 27'; Trigueros 39'; Danjuma 60'; Moreno 90+4' | Report | Mojica 19'; Fidel (yellow card) 40'; González (yellow card) 73' | Stadium: Estadio de la Cerámica; Attendance: 8,234; Referee: Alejandro Muñiz Ruiz |

| 25 September 2021 7 | Real Madrid | 0–0 | Villarreal | Madrid |
| 21:00 CEST (UTC+2) | Vinícius (yellow card) 40' | Report | Coquelin (yellow card) 55'; Gómez (yellow card) 70' | Stadium: Santiago Bernabéu; Attendance: 23,985; Referee: Jesús Gil Manzano |

| 3 October 2021 8 | Villarreal | 2–0 | Real Betis | Villarreal |
| 18:30 CEST (UTC+2) | Danjuma 45+1', 69'; Capoue (yellow card) 56'; Torres (yellow card) 62' | Report | Fekir (yellow card) 33'; Juanmi (yellow card) 40'; González (yellow card) 72'; Rodríguez (yellow card) 81' | Stadium: Estadio de la Cerámica; Attendance: 16,719; Referee: José María Sánchez Martínez |

| 17 October 2021 9 | Villarreal | 1–2 | Osasuna | Villarreal |
| 18:30 CEST (UTC+2) | Capoue (yellow card) 33'; Gerard 55' | Report | Torró 26', (yellow card) 86'; Herrera (yellow card) 30'; D. García (yellow card) 54'; U. García (yellow card) 60'; Ávila 87', (yellow card) 88' | Stadium: Estadio de la Cerámica; Attendance: 14,831; Referee: Adrián Cordero Vega |

| 23 October 2021 10 | Athletic Bilbao | 2–1 | Villarreal | Bilbao |
| 21:00 CEST (UTC+2) | R. García 14'; Muniain 77' (pen.); Berenguer (penalty missed) 82' | Report | Coquelin 32'; Foyth (yellow card) 55'; Moreno (yellow card) 76'; Estupiñán (yellow card) 80' | Stadium: San Mamés; Attendance: 38,698; Referee: Guillermo Cuadra Fernández |

| 26 October 2021 11 | Villarreal | 3–3 | Cádiz | Villarreal |
| 21:30 CEST (UTC+2) | Mandi (yellow card) 20'; Torres 43'; Alcácer (yellow card) 45+2'; Coquelin (yellow card) 70'; Dia 80'; Danjuma 90+5' | Report | Lozano 14', 45+1', 52', (yellow card) 50'; Espino (yellow card) 32'; Fali (yellow card) 37'; Alejo (yellow card) 59'; Akapo (yellow card) 89'; Haroyan (yellow card) 90+1' | Stadium: Estadio de la Cerámica; Attendance: 12,190; Referee: Alejandro Hernández Hernández |

| 30 October 2021 12 | Valencia | 2–0 | Villarreal | Valencia |
| 18:30 CEST (UTC+2) | Guillamón 43', (yellow card) 47'; Alderete (yellow card) 63'; Soler 77' (pen.) | Report | Danjuma (yellow card) 53'; Trigueros (yellow card) 73'; Albiol (yellow card) 75'; Chukwueze (yellow card) 79' | Stadium: Mestalla; Attendance: 31,487; Referee: José Luis Munuera Montero |

| 7 November 2021 13 | Villarreal | 1–0 | Getafe | Villarreal |
| 14:00 CET (UTC+1) | Trigueros 10'; Albiol (yellow card) 70' | Report | Mata (yellow card) 36'; Arambarri (yellow card) 52' | Stadium: Estadio de la Cerámica; Attendance: 13,504; Referee: Jesús Gil Manzano |

| 20 November 2021 14 | Celta Vigo | 1–1 | Villarreal | Vigo |
| 14:00 CET (UTC+1) | Mina (yellow card) 17'; Méndez 72' | Report | Moreno 27'; Foyth (yellow card) 45' | Stadium: Balaídos; Attendance: 10,086; Referee: Javier Alberola Rojas |

| 27 November 2021 15 | Villarreal | 1–3 | Barcelona | Villarreal |
| 21:00 CET (UTC+1) | Pino (yellow card) 26'; Chukwueze 76'; Raba (yellow card) 90+1' | Report | Alba (yellow card) 26'; Piqué (yellow card) 44'; F. de Jong 48'; Depay 88'; Coutinho 90+4' (pen.) | Stadium: Estadio de la Cerámica; Attendance: 19,050; Referee: César Soto Grado |

| 4 December 2021 16 | Sevilla | 1–0 | Villarreal | Seville |
| 14:00 CET (UTC+1) | Ocampos 16'; Rakitić (yellow card) 45+3'; Mir (yellow card) 57' | Report | Albiol (yellow card) 61'; Dia (yellow card) 90+2' | Stadium: Ramón Sánchez Pizjuán; Attendance: 30,865; Referee: Carlos del Cerro Grande |

| 12 December 2021 17 | Villarreal | 2–0 | Rayo Vallecano | Villarreal |
| 14:00 CET (UTC+1) | Torres (yellow card) 23'; Mandi 32'; Gerard 36' (pen.) | Report | Catena (yellow card) 37'; Palazón (yellow card) 38'; F. García (yellow card) 61' | Stadium: Estadio de la Cerámica; Attendance: 13,133; Referee: Mario Melero López |

| 18 December 2021 18 | Real Sociedad | 1–3 | Villarreal | San Sebastián |
| 16:15 CET (UTC+1) | Isak 32'; Merino (yellow card) 43'; Oyarzabal (red card) 49'; Zaldúa (yellow card) 88' | Report | Estupiñán (yellow card) 26'; Moreno 38', 68'; Torres (yellow card) 44'; Parejo (yellow card) 81'; Chukwueze 90+6' | Stadium: Anoeta; Attendance: 29,679; Referee: Jorge Figueroa Vázquez |

| 21 December 2021 4 | Villarreal | 5–2 | Alavés | Villarreal |
| 19:00 CET (UTC+1) | Gerard 18', 88'; Dia 27', 76'; Pino 79' | Report | Pons 44'; Loum (yellow card) 45+1'; López (yellow card) 49'; Joselu 65' | Stadium: Estadio de la Cerámica; Attendance: 12,530; Referee: Valentín Pizarro Gómez |
Note: The match was originally scheduled for 11 September 2021, but was postponed due to the late return of several South American players from international duty.

| 3 January 2022 19 | Villarreal | 5–0 | Levante | Villarreal |
| 19:00 CET (UTC+1) | Dia 8'; Aurier (yellow card) 10'; Torres 13'; Gerard 37', 79'; Iborra (yellow card) 50'; Trigueros 74', (yellow card) 76' | Report | Bardhi (yellow card) 4'; Clerc (yellow card) 47' | Stadium: Estadio de la Cerámica; Attendance: 13,462; Referee: Alejandro Hernández Hernández |

| 9 January 2022 20 | Villarreal | 2–2 | Atlético Madrid | Villarreal |
| 21:00 CET (UTC+1) | Gerard (penalty missed) 23'; Torres 29'; Moreno 58' | Report | Correa 10'; Kondogbia 67', (yellow card) 71' (yellow-red card) 90+2' | Stadium: Estadio de la Cerámica; Attendance: 14,127; Referee: Javier Alberola Rojas |

| 16 January 2022 21 | Elche | 1–0 | Villarreal | Elche |
| 14:00 CET (UTC+1) | Verdú (yellow card) 10'; Boyé 78'; Mojica (yellow card) 87'; González (yellow card) 90+4'; Milla (yellow card) 90+4' | Report | Parejo (yellow card) 81'; Capoue (yellow card) 90+3'; Iborra (yellow card) 90+4' | Stadium: Estadio Manuel Martínez Valero; Attendance: 12,433; Referee: Valentín Pizarro Gómez |

| 22 January 2022 22 | Villarreal | 3–0 | Mallorca | Villarreal |
| 16:15 CET (UTC+1) | Russo 12' (o.g.); Trigueros 34'; Mario Gaspar (yellow card) 36'; Parejo 87' (pen.) | Report | Russo (yellow card) 80' (yellow-red card) 86' | Stadium: Estadio de la Cerámica; Attendance: 13,207; Referee: Miguel Ángel Ortiz Arias |

| 6 February 2022 23 | Real Betis | 0–2 | Villarreal | Seville |
| 18:30 CET (UTC+1) | Canales (yellow card) 86'; Iglesias (yellow card) 90+1' | Report | Chukwueze (yellow card) 25'; Moreno (yellow card) 37'; Torres 41'; Capoue (yellow card) 71', (goal) 83' | Stadium: Benito Villamarín; Attendance: 44,870; Referee: Pablo González Fuertes |

| 12 February 2022 24 | Villarreal | 0–0 | Real Madrid | Villarreal |
| 16:15 CET (UTC+1) | Foyth (yellow card) 23'; Albiol (yellow card) 51' | Report | Militão (yellow card) 23'; Asensio (yellow card) 29'; Bale (yellow card) 45+2'; Casemiro (yellow card) 88' | Stadium: Estadio de la Cerámica; Attendance: 17,894; Referee: José María Sánchez Martínez |

| 19 February 2022 25 | Granada | 1–4 | Villarreal | Granada |
| 14:00 CET (UTC+1) | Sánchez (yellow card) 32'; Uzuni (yellow card) 34'; Milla 61' (pen.); Torrente (yellow card) 80' | Report | Lo Celso (yellow card) 34'; Danjuma 35' (pen.), 39', 81' (pen.); Estupiñán (yellow card) 45+4'; Aurier (yellow card) 60'; Chukwueze (yellow card) 68'; Asenjo (yellow card) 75'; Iborra (yellow card) 90+2'; Gómez 90+7' | Stadium: Nuevo Los Cármenes; Attendance: 13,389; Referee: Jesús Gil Manzano |

| 27 February 2022 26 | Villarreal | 5–1 | Espanyol | Villarreal |
| 14:00 CET (UTC+1) | Pino 14', 20', 45', 53'; Aurier (yellow card) 31'; Dia 86'; Albiol (yellow card) 90+3' | Report | Pedrosa (yellow card) 40'; Bare 65' | Stadium: Estadio de la Cerámica; Attendance: 15,600; Referee: Ricardo de Burgos Bengoetxea |

| 5 March 2022 27 | Osasuna | 1–0 | Villarreal | Pamplona |
| 14:00 CET (UTC+1) | Ávila 63', (yellow card) 74' | Report | | Stadium: El Sadar; Attendance: 18,659; Referee: José Luis Munuera Montero |

| 12 March 2022 28 | Villarreal | 1–0 | Celta Vigo | Villarreal |
| 18:30 CET (UTC+1) | Iborra (yellow card) 34'; Parejo 64' | Report | Galán (yellow card) 90+4' | Stadium: Estadio de la Cerámica; Attendance: 14,929; Referee: Santiago Jaime Latre |

| 20 March 2022 29 | Cádiz | 1–0 | Villarreal | Cádiz |
| 16:15 CET (UTC+1) | Lozano (yellow card) 31'; Idrissi (yellow card) 48'; San Emeterio (yellow card) 55'; Sobrino 90' | Report | Torres (yellow card) 31'; Capoue (yellow card) 48' | Stadium: Nuevo Mirandilla; Attendance: 13,325; Referee: Alejandro Hernández Hernández |

| 2 April 2022 30 | Levante | 2–0 | Villarreal | Valencia |
| 16:15 CEST (UTC+2) | Morales (yellow card) 21', (goal) 69', 90+1'; Roger (yellow card) 56'; Malsa (yellow card) 88'; Pepelu (yellow card) 89' | Report | Torres (yellow card) 64'; Coquelin (yellow card) 74' | Stadium: Ciutat de València; Attendance: 14,908; Referee: Adrián Cordero Vega |

| 9 April 2022 31 | Villarreal | 1–1 | Athletic Bilbao | Villarreal |
| 18:30 CEST (UTC+2) | Pedraza (yellow card) 50', (goal) 60'; Mandi (yellow card) 81' | Report | R. García 43'; Petxarroman (yellow card) 85'; D. García (yellow card) 90'; Sancet (yellow card) 90+1' | Stadium: Estadio de la Cerámica; Attendance: 16,603; Referee: Carlos del Cerro Grande |

| 16 April 2022 32 | Getafe | 1–2 | Villarreal | Getafe |
| 21:00 CEST (UTC+2) | Suárez (yellow card) 20'; Arambarri (yellow card) 60'; Ünal 63' | Report | Gerard 7'; Trigueros 16' | Stadium: Coliseum Alfonso Pérez; Attendance: 9,647; Referee: Pablo González Fuertes |

| 19 April 2022 33 | Villarreal | 2–0 | Valencia | Villarreal |
| 21:30 CEST (UTC+2) | Danjuma 10' (pen.), 17'; Trigueros (yellow card) 75'; Aurier (yellow card) 84' | Report | Cömert (yellow card) 9'; Marcos André (yellow card) 40'; Moriba (yellow card) 66' | Stadium: Estadio de la Cerámica; Attendance: 13,570; Referee: José Luis Munuera Montero |

| 30 April 2022 34 | Alavés | 2–1 | Villarreal | Vitoria-Gasteiz |
| 14:00 CEST (UTC+2) | Laguardia 4', (yellow card) 80'; Escalante 31', (yellow card) 69'; García (yellow card) 52'; Duarte (yellow card) 90+2'; Jason (yellow card) 90+5' | Report | Dia (yellow card) 41'; Chukwueze 47'; Capoue (yellow card) 76' | Stadium: Mendizorrotza; Attendance: 12,579; Referee: Miguel Ángel Ortiz Arias |

| 8 May 2022 35 | Villarreal | 1–1 | Sevilla | Villarreal |
| 16:15 CEST (UTC+2) | Chukwueze (yellow card) 4'; Lo Celso (yellow card) 45', (goal) 86'; Capoue (yellow card) 73' | Report | Koundé 90+5' | Stadium: Estadio de la Cerámica; Attendance: 17,461; Referee: Jesús Gil Manzano |

| 12 May 2022 36 | Rayo Vallecano | 1–5 | Villarreal | Madrid |
| 20:00 CEST (UTC+2) | Guardiola 21'; Maraš (yellow card) 30'; Á. García (yellow card) 45+2'; Comesaña (yellow card) 45+2'; López (yellow card) 76'; Sylla (yellow card) 77' | Report | Pedraza 3', 88'; Foyth 27'; Alcácer 38'; Torres 45+1'; Rulli (yellow card) 61'; Albiol (yellow card) 82' | Stadium: Campo de Fútbol de Vallecas; Attendance: 7,945; Referee: Isidro Díaz de Mera Escuderos |

| 15 May 2022 37 | Villarreal | 1–2 | Real Sociedad | Villarreal |
| 19:30 CEST (UTC+2) | Coquelin 43'; Foyth (yellow card) 68'; Albiol (yellow card) 77'; Lo Celso (yellow card) 90+6'; Jackson (yellow card) 90+11' | Report | Zaldúa (yellow card) 2'; Isak 56', (yellow card) 82'; Zubimendi 73' | Stadium: Estadio de la Cerámica; Attendance: 16,689; Referee: Pablo González Fuertes |

| 22 May 2022 38 | Barcelona | 0–2 | Villarreal | Barcelona |
| 22:00 CEST (UTC+2) | Gavi (yellow card) 45+1'; Busquets (yellow card) 59'; Alba (yellow card) 65' | Report | Pedraza 41'; Parejo (yellow card) 45+2'; Gómez 55' | Stadium: Camp Nou; Attendance: 54,850; Referee: José Luis Munuera Montero |

=== Copa del Rey ===
| 30 November 2021 First round | Victoria | 0–8 | Villarreal | A Coruña |
| 19:00 CET (UTC+1) | | Report | Moreno 17', 22'; Mandi 28'; Alcácer 37'; Chukwueze 50'; Gerard 74'; Dia 82'; Iosifov 87' | Stadium: Riazor (Note: The match was played at the Riazor in A Coruña, instead of Victoria's regular stadium, the San Pedro de Visma, as it did not meet the requirements established by the Royal Spanish Football Federation.); Referee: Pablo González Fuertes |

| 15 December 2021 Second round | Atlético Sanluqueño | 1–7 | Villarreal | Sanlúcar de Barrameda |
| 21:00 CET (UTC+1) | Armental 60' | Report | Alcácer 8', 13'; Duro 27' (o.g.); Chukwueze 40'; Gómez 42'; Foyth (yellow card) 54'; Trigueros 67'; Raba 79' | Stadium: Estadio El Palmar; Referee: Jesús Gil Manzano |

| 6 January 2022 Round of 32 | Sporting Gijón | 2–1 | Villarreal | Gijón |
| 18:00 CET (UTC+1) | Đurđević 67'; Milovanov 88' | Report | Albiol 48' | Stadium: El Molinón-Enrique Castro "Quini"; Referee: Alejandro Muñiz Ruiz |

=== UEFA Champions League ===
==== Group stage ====
The draw for the group stage was held on 26 August 2021.

| Pos | Team | Pld | W | D | L | GF | GA | GD | Pts | Qualification | MUN | VIL | ATA | YB |
|---|---|---|---|---|---|---|---|---|---|---|---|---|---|---|
| 1 | (England) Manchester United | 6 | 3 | 2 | 1 | 11 | 8 | +3 | 11 | Advance to knockout phase | — | 2–1 | 3–2 | 1–1 |
| 2 | (Spain) Villarreal | 6 | 3 | 1 | 2 | 12 | 9 | +3 | 10 | Advance to knockout phase | 0–2 | — | 2–2 | 2–0 |
| 3 | (Italy) Atalanta | 6 | 1 | 3 | 2 | 12 | 13 | −1 | 6 | Transfer to Europa League | 2–2 | 2–3 | — | 1–0 |
| 4 | (Switzerland) Young Boys | 6 | 1 | 2 | 3 | 7 | 12 | −5 | 5 | | 2–1 | 1–4 | 3–3 | — |

Source: UEFA
Rules for classification: Group stage tiebreakers

| 14 September 2021 1 | Villarreal (Spain) | 2–2 | (Italy) Atalanta | Villarreal, Spain |
| 21:00 CEST (UTC+2) | Trigueros 39'; Capoue (yellow card) 55'; Gerard (yellow card) 65'; Pino (yellow card) 71'; Danjuma 73'; Coquelin (yellow card) 76' (yellow-red card) 84' | Report | Freuler 6'; De Roon (yellow card) 24'; Gosens 83' | Stadium: Estadio de la Cerámica; Attendance: 12,916; Referee: Clément Turpin (France) |

| 29 September 2021 2 | Manchester United (England) | 2–1 | (Spain) Villarreal | Manchester, England |
| 20:00 BST (UTC+1) | Telles 60', (yellow card) 71'; Greenwood (yellow card) 68'; Ronaldo 90+5', (yellow card) 90+6' | Report | Alcácer 53'; Moreno (yellow card) 59'; Pino (yellow card) 67'; Albiol (yellow card) 68'; Peña (yellow card) 90+1' | Stadium: Old Trafford; Attendance: 73,130; Referee: Felix Zwayer (Germany) |

| 20 October 2021 3 | Young Boys (Switzerland) | 1–4 | (Spain) Villarreal | Bern, Switzerland |
| 18:45 CEST (UTC+2) | Aebischer (yellow card) 45'; Elia 77' | Report | Pino 6'; Gerard 16'; Rulli (yellow card) 87'; Moreno 89'; Chukwueze 90+2' | Stadium: Stadion Wankdorf; Attendance: 27,398; Referee: Sergei Karasev (Russia) |

| 2 November 2021 4 | Villarreal (Spain) | 2–0 | (Switzerland) Young Boys | Villarreal, Spain |
| 21:00 CET (UTC+1) | Capoue 36'; Pedraza (yellow card) 38'; Mario Gaspar (yellow card) 55'; Parejo (yellow card) 78'; Danjuma 89' | Report | Sierro (yellow card) 52'; Ngamaleu (yellow card) 54'; Aebischer (yellow card) 62'; Elia (yellow card) 90+5' | Stadium: Estadio de la Cerámica; Attendance: 14,890; Referee: Serdar Gözübüyük (Netherlands) |

| 23 November 2021 5 | Villarreal (Spain) | 0–2 | (England) Manchester United | Villarreal, Spain |
| 18:45 CET (UTC+1) | Pino (yellow card) 33' | Report | Van de Beek (yellow card) 41'; Ronaldo 78'; Sancho 90' | Stadium: Estadio de la Cerámica; Attendance: 20,875; Referee: Felix Brych (Germany) |

| 9 December 2021 6 | Atalanta (Italy) | 2–3 | (Spain) Villarreal | Bergamo, Italy |
| 19:00 CET (UTC+1) | Malinovskyi 71'; Zapata 80'; Muriel (yellow card) 89' | Report | Danjuma 3', 51'; Capoue 42'; Parejo (yellow card) 57'; Moreno (yellow card) 57' | Stadium: Stadio Atleti Azzurri d'Italia; Attendance: 11,690; Referee: Anthony Taylor (England) |
Note: The match was originally scheduled on 8 December 2021 at 21:00 CET, but was postponed to the following day at 19:00 CET due to adverse weather conditions.

==== Knockout phase ====
===== Round of 16 =====
The draw for the round of 16 was held on 13 December 2021.

| 22 February 2022 First leg | Villarreal (Spain) | 1–1 | (Italy) Juventus | Villarreal, Spain |
| 21:00 CET (UTC+1) | Parejo 66'; Rulli (yellow card) 73' | Report | Vlahović 1'; Rabiot (yellow card) 73' | Stadium: Estadio de la Cerámica; Attendance: 17,686; Referee: Daniel Siebert (Germany) |

| 16 March 2022 Second leg | Juventus (Italy) | 0–3 (1–4 agg.) | (Spain) Villarreal | Turin, Italy |
| 21:00 CET (UTC+1) | De Ligt (yellow card) 90' | Report | Gerard 78' (pen.); Torres 85'; Danjuma 90+2' (pen.) | Stadium: Juventus Stadium; Attendance: 30,385; Referee: Szymon Marciniak (Poland) |

===== Quarter-finals =====
The draw for the quarter-finals was held on 18 March 2022.

| 6 April 2022 First leg | Villarreal (Spain) | 1–0 | (Germany) Bayern Munich | Villarreal, Spain |
| 21:00 CEST (UTC+2) | Danjuma 8'; Estupiñán (yellow card) 74' | Report | | Stadium: Estadio de la Cerámica; Attendance: 21,626; Referee: Anthony Taylor (England) |

| 12 April 2022 Second leg | Bayern Munich (Germany) | 1–1 (1–2 agg.) | (Spain) Villarreal | Munich, Germany |
| 21:00 CEST (UTC+2) | Lewandowski (yellow card) 33', (goal) 52' | Report | Foyth (yellow card) 59'; Chukwueze 88'; Lo Celso (yellow card) 90+1' | Stadium: Allianz Arena; Attendance: 70,000; Referee: Slavko Vinčić (Slovenia) |

===== Semi-finals =====
The draw for the semi-finals was held on 18 March 2022, after the quarter-final draw.

| 27 April 2022 First leg | Liverpool (England) | 2–0 | (Spain) Villarreal | Liverpool, England |
| 20:00 BST (UTC+1) | Van Dijk (yellow card) 32'; Estupiñán 53' (o.g.); Mané 55' | Report | Estupiñán (yellow card) 47'; Lo Celso (yellow card) 62' | Stadium: Anfield; Attendance: 51,586; Referee: Szymon Marciniak (Poland) |

| 3 May 2022 Second leg | Villarreal (Spain) | 2–3 (2–5 agg.) | (England) Liverpool | Villarreal, Spain |
| 21:00 CEST (UTC+2) | Dia 3'; Coquelin 41'; Capoue (yellow card) 63' (yellow-red card) 86'; Lo Celso (yellow card) 81'; Torres (yellow card) 85' | Report | Fabinho 62'; Díaz 67'; Mané 74'; Alexander-Arnold (yellow card) 77' | Stadium: Estadio de la Cerámica; Attendance: 23,665; Referee: Danny Makkelie (Netherlands) |

=== UEFA Super Cup ===
| 11 August 2021 Final | Chelsea (England) | 1–1 (a.e.t.) (6–5 p) | (Spain) Villarreal | Belfast, Northern Ireland |
| 20:00 BST (UTC+1) | Ziyech 27'; Rüdiger (yellow card) 44' | Report | Pino (yellow card) 61'; Gerard 73'; Raba (yellow card) 119' | Stadium: Windsor Park; Attendance: 10,435; Referee: Sergei Karasev (Russia) |
| | Penalties |
| | Havertz (penalty missed); Azpilicueta (penalty scored); Alonso (penalty scored); Mount (penalty scored); Jorginho (penalty scored); Pulisic (penalty scored); Rüdiger (penalty scored) | | (penalty scored) Gerard; (penalty missed) Mandi; (penalty scored) Estupiñán; (penalty scored) Gómez; (penalty scored) Raba; (penalty scored) Foyth; (penalty missed) Albiol |

== Statistics ==
=== Squad statistics ===
Last updated 22 May 2022.

| No. | Pos | Nat | Player | Total | | La Liga | | Copa del Rey | | UEFA Champions League | | UEFA Super Cup | |
| No. | Pos | Nat | Player | Apps | Goals | Apps | Goals | Apps | Goals | Apps | Goals | Apps | Goals |
Goalkeepers
| 1 | GK | (Spain) ESP | Sergio Asenjo | 8 | 0 | 6 | 0 | 1 | 0 | 0 | 0 | 1 | 0 |
| 13 | GK | (Argentina) ARG | Gerónimo Rulli | 46 | 0 | 32 | 0 | 2 | 0 | 12 | 0 | 0 | 0 |
| 35 | GK | (Denmark) DEN | Filip Jörgensen | 1 | 0 | 0 | 0 | 0+1 | 0 | 0 | 0 | 0 | 0 |
Defenders
| 2 | DF | (Spain) ESP | Mario Gaspar | 18 | 0 | 7+5 | 0 | 2+1 | 0 | 1+1 | 0 | 0+1 | 0 |
| 3 | DF | (Spain) ESP | Raúl Albiol | 43 | 1 | 28 | 0 | 1+1 | 1 | 12 | 0 | 1 | 0 |
| 4 | DF | (Spain) ESP | Pau Torres | 47 | 6 | 33 | 5 | 1 | 0 | 12 | 1 | 1 | 0 |
| 8 | DF | (Argentina) ARG | Juan Foyth | 38 | 1 | 22+3 | 1 | 1+1 | 0 | 10 | 0 | 1 | 0 |
| 12 | DF | (Ecuador) ECU | Pervis Estupiñán | 41 | 0 | 17+11 | 0 | 1+1 | 0 | 7+3 | 0 | 0+1 | 0 |
| 18 | DF | (Spain) ESP | Alberto Moreno | 35 | 6 | 13+11 | 3 | 2+1 | 2 | 3+4 | 1 | 1 | 0 |
| 20 | DF | (Spain) ESP | Rubén Peña | 11 | 0 | 1+6 | 0 | 2 | 0 | 0+2 | 0 | 0 | 0 |
| 22 | DF | (Algeria) ALG | Aïssa Mandi | 22 | 2 | 14+3 | 1 | 2 | 1 | 0+2 | 0 | 0+1 | 0 |
| 24 | DF | (Spain) ESP | Alfonso Pedraza | 41 | 4 | 19+9 | 4 | 2 | 0 | 4+6 | 0 | 1 | 0 |
| 25 | DF | (Ivory Coast) CIV | Serge Aurier | 24 | 0 | 10+9 | 0 | 0 | 0 | 1+4 | 0 | 0 | 0 |
| 27 | DF | (Spain) ESP | Adrián de la Fuente | 1 | 0 | 0 | 0 | 1 | 0 | 0 | 0 | 0 | 0 |
| 37 | DF | (Spain) ESP | Dani Tasende | 1 | 0 | 0 | 0 | 0+1 | 0 | 0 | 0 | 0 | 0 |
Midfielders
| 5 | MF | (Spain) ESP | Dani Parejo | 46 | 3 | 32+1 | 2 | 0+1 | 0 | 12 | 1 | 0 | 0 |
| 6 | MF | (France) FRA | Étienne Capoue | 44 | 3 | 26+4 | 1 | 1 | 0 | 12 | 2 | 1 | 0 |
| 10 | MF | (Spain) ESP | Vicente Iborra | 24 | 0 | 12+8 | 0 | 2+1 | 0 | 0+1 | 0 | 0 | 0 |
| 11 | MF | (Nigeria) NGR | Samuel Chukwueze | 35 | 7 | 12+15 | 3 | 2 | 2 | 2+4 | 2 | 0 | 0 |
| 14 | MF | (Spain) ESP | Manu Trigueros | 47 | 8 | 27+8 | 6 | 2 | 1 | 4+5 | 1 | 1 | 0 |
| 17 | MF | (Argentina) ARG | Giovani Lo Celso | 22 | 1 | 11+5 | 1 | 0 | 0 | 6 | 0 | 0 | 0 |
| 19 | MF | (France) FRA | Francis Coquelin | 28 | 3 | 8+12 | 2 | 0 | 0 | 6+2 | 1 | 0 | 0 |
| 21 | MF | (Spain) ESP | Yeremy Pino | 40 | 7 | 21+10 | 6 | 0+1 | 0 | 6+1 | 1 | 1 | 0 |
| 23 | MF | (Spain) ESP | Moi Gómez | 38 | 3 | 13+16 | 2 | 2 | 1 | 2+4 | 0 | 0+1 | 0 |
| 28 | MF | (Russia) RUS | Nikita Iosifov | 2 | 1 | 0+1 | 0 | 0+1 | 1 | 0 | 0 | 0 | 0 |
| 38 | MF | (Spain) ESP | Carlo Adriano | 2 | 0 | 0+1 | 0 | 0+1 | 0 | 0 | 0 | 0 | 0 |
Forwards
| 7 | FW | (Spain) ESP | Gerard Moreno | 27 | 13 | 14+3 | 9 | 0+2 | 1 | 6+1 | 2 | 1 | 1 |
| 9 | FW | (Spain) ESP | Paco Alcácer | 23 | 5 | 10+8 | 1 | 2 | 3 | 1+2 | 1 | 0 | 0 |
| 15 | FW | (Netherlands) NED | Arnaut Danjuma | 34 | 16 | 17+6 | 10 | 0 | 0 | 10+1 | 6 | 0 | 0 |
| 16 | FW | (Senegal) SEN | Boulaye Dia | 35 | 7 | 13+12 | 5 | 0+1 | 1 | 3+5 | 1 | 1 | 0 |
| 26 | FW | (Senegal) SEN | Nicolas Jackson | 10 | 0 | 0+9 | 0 | 1 | 0 | 0 | 0 | 0 | 0 |
Players transferred out during the season
| 17 | FW | (Spain) ESP | Dani Raba | 12 | 1 | 0+7 | 0 | 3 | 1 | 0+1 | 0 | 0+1 | 0 |
| - | MF | (Spain) ESP | Manu Morlanes | 1 | 0 | 0 | 0 | 0 | 0 | 0 | 0 | 0+1 | 0 |
| - | DF | (Spain) ESP | Jorge Cuenca | 1 | 0 | 0 | 0 | 0 | 0 | 0 | 0 | 1 | 0 |

=== Goalscorers ===
As of 17 March 2022

| Rank | No. | Pos. | Nat. | Player | La Liga | Copa del Rey | Champions League | UEFA Super Cup | Total |
|---|---|---|---|---|---|---|---|---|---|
| 1 | 15 | FW | (Netherlands) | Arnaut Danjuma | 8 | 0 | 5 | 0 | 13 |
| 2 | 7 | FW | (Spain) | Gerard Moreno | 8 | 1 | 2 | 1 | 12 |
| 3 | 14 | MF | (Spain) | Manu Trigueros | 5 | 1 | 1 | 0 | 7 |
| 3 | 21 | FW | (Spain) | Yeremy Pino | 6 | 0 | 1 | 0 | 7 |
| 5 | 16 | FW | (Senegal) | Boulaye Dia | 5 | 1 | 0 | 0 | 6 |
| 5 | 18 | DF | (Spain) | Alberto Moreno | 3 | 2 | 1 | 0 | 6 |
| 7 | 4 | DF | (Spain) | Pau Torres | 4 | 0 | 1 | 0 | 5 |
| 7 | 11 | FW | (Nigeria) | Samuel Chukwueze | 2 | 2 | 1 | 0 | 5 |
| 9 | 9 | FW | (Spain) | Paco Alcácer | 0 | 3 | 1 | 0 | 4 |
| 10 | 5 | MF | (Spain) | Dani Parejo | 2 | 0 | 1 | 0 | 3 |
| 10 | 6 | MF | (France) | Étienne Capoue | 1 | 0 | 2 | 0 | 3 |
| 12 | 22 | DF | (Algeria) | Aïssa Mandi | 1 | 1 | 0 | 0 | 2 |
| 13 | 3 | DF | (Spain) | Raúl Albiol | 0 | 1 | 0 | 0 | 1 |
| 13 | 12 | MF | (Spain) | Dani Raba | 0 | 1 | 0 | 0 | 1 |
| 13 | 15 | MF | (Russia) | Nikita Iosifov | 0 | 1 | 0 | 0 | 1 |
| 13 | 19 | MF | (France) | Francis Coquelin | 1 | 0 | 0 | 0 | 1 |
| 13 | 23 | MF | (Spain) | Moi Gómez | 0 | 1 | 0 | 0 | 1 |
| Own goals | | | | | 1 | 1 | 0 | 0 | 2 |
| Totals | | | | | 48 | 16 | 16 | 1 | 81 |
