= Adrià Altimira =

Spanish footballer

Personal information
- Full name: Adrià Altimira Reynaldos
- Date of birth: 28 March 2001 (age 25)
- Place of birth: Cardedeu, Spain
- Height: 1.70 m (5 ft 7 in)
- Positions: Right-back; right winger

Team information
- Current team: Deportivo A Coruña
- Number: 2

Youth career
- 2006–2008: Granollers
- 2008–2020: Barcelona

Senior career*
| Years | Team | Apps | (Gls) |
| 2020 | Lokomotiva | 0 | (0) |
| 2020–2021 | Melilla | 24 | (1) |
| 2021–2023 | Andorra | 62 | (1) |
| 2023–2024 | Villarreal B | 27 | (0) |
| 2023–2025 | Villarreal | 12 | (0) |
| 2024–2025 | → Leganés (loan) | 22 | (0) |
| 2026– | Deportivo A Coruña | 22 | (1) |

International career
| 2025– | Catalonia | 1 | (0) |
- * Club domestic league appearances and goals as of 31 May 2026

Adrià Altimira Reynaldos (born 28 March 2001), sometimes known as Alti, is a Spanish professional footballer who plays as a right-back or right winger for La Liga club Deportivo A Coruña.

== Career ==
Born in Cardedeu, Barcelona, Catalonia, Altimira joined FC Barcelona's La Masia in 2008, from EC Granollers. On 27 August 2020, after finishing his formation, he moved to Croatian side NK Lokomotiva Zagreb, but terminated his contract shortly after and returned to his home country, signing for Segunda División B side UD Melilla on 7 October.

Altimira made his senior debut on 1 November 2020, playing the last 30 minutes in a 1–0 home win over CF Villanovense. He scored his first senior goal the following 16 May, netting his team's third in a 3–0 home win over Atlético Madrid B.

On 1 July 2021, Altimira joined FC Andorra in the newly created Primera División RFEF. He featured regularly for the side during the campaign, appearing in 29 matches overall as his side achieved a first-ever promotion to Segunda División.

Altimira made his professional debut on 15 August 2022, starting in a 1–0 away win over Real Oviedo. He scored his first goal in the category five days later, but in a 4–1 away loss to Sporting de Gijón.

On 14 June 2023, after rejecting a contract renewal from Andorra, Altimira signed for Villarreal CF and was assigned to the reserves also in the second division. He made his first team – and La Liga – debut on 22 October, replacing Aïssa Mandi in a 1–1 home draw against Deportivo Alavés.

On 17 June 2024, Altimira renewed his link with the Yellow Submarine until 2026, but was loaned to fellow top tier side CD Leganés on 21 August.

On 29 December 2025, Altimira left Villarreal after his contract was terminated by mutual agreement. The following day, he joined Segunda División club Deportivo La Coruña on a free transfer, signing a contract until June 2028.

== Personal life ==
Altimira's uncle and cousin are also involved with football: his uncle Aureli was also a footballer who played as a forward and later became a coach, while his cousin Sergi is a midfielder; both were also Barcelona youth graduates.

== Career statistics ==
As of match played 24 May 2025

Appearances and goals by club, season and competition
| Club | Season | League | | | Cup (Note: Includes Copa del Rey, Copa Catalunya) | | Europe | | Other | | Total | |
| Club | Season | Division | Apps | Goals | Apps | Goals | Apps | Goals | Apps | Goals | Apps | Goals |
|---|---|---|---|---|---|---|---|---|---|---|---|---|
| Melilla | 2020–21 | Segunda División B | 24 | 1 | — | | — | | — | | 24 | 1 |
| FC Andorra | 2021–22 | Primera Federación | 26 | 0 | 2 | 0 | — | | 1 (Note: Appearance in 2022 Primera División RFEF play-offs) | 0 | 29 | 0 |
| FC Andorra | 2022–23 | Segunda División | 36 | 1 | 3 | 0 | — | | — | | 39 | 1 |
| FC Andorra | Total | | 62 | 1 | 5 | 0 | — | | 1 | 0 | 68 | 1 |
| Villarreal B | 2023–24 | Segunda División | 27 | 0 | — | | — | | — | | 27 | 0 |
| Villarreal | 2023–24 | La Liga | 11 | 0 | 3 | 0 | 4 (Note: Appearances in UEFA Europa League) | 0 | — | | 17 | 0 |
| Leganés (loan) | 2024–25 | La Liga | 22 | 0 | 4 | 1 | — | | — | | 26 | 1 |
| Career total | | | 146 | 2 | 12 | 1 | 4 | 0 | 1 | 0 | 162 | 3 |
