= Juan Foyth =

Argentine footballer (born 1998)

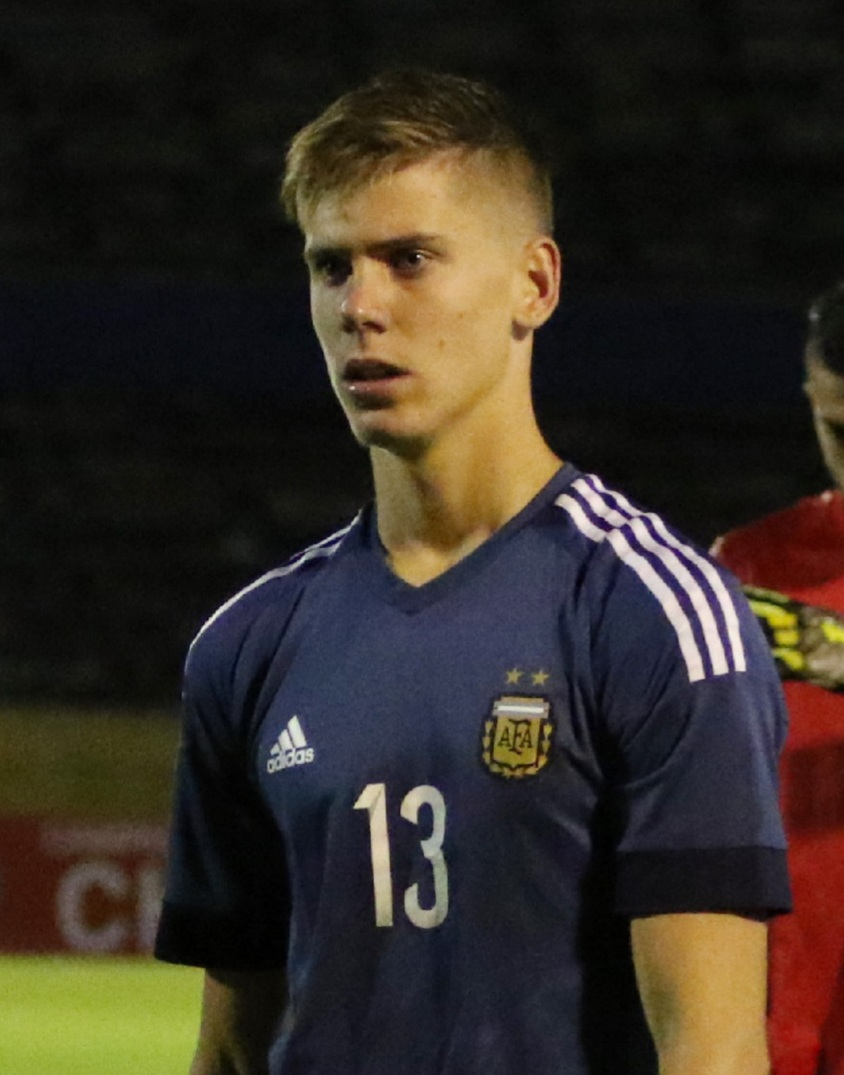
- Foyth with Argentina U20 in 2017

Personal information
- Full name: Juan Marcos Foyth
- Date of birth: 12 January 1998 (age 28)
- Place of birth: La Plata, Buenos Aires, Argentina
- Height: 1.88 m (6 ft 2 in)
- Positions: Centre-back; right-back

Team information
- Current team: Villarreal
- Number: 8

Youth career
- 2015–2017: Estudiantes

Senior career*
Years	Team	Apps	(Gls)
2016–2017	Estudiantes	7	(0)
2017–2021	Tottenham Hotspur	16	(1)
2020–2021	→ Villarreal (loan)	16	(0)
2021–	Villarreal	98	(4)

International career^{‡}
2017–2018	Argentina U20	12	(0)
2018–	Argentina	22	(0)
Medal record
Men's football
Representing Argentina
FIFA World Cup
Winner	2022 Qatar
CONMEBOL–UEFA Cup of Champions
Winner	2022 England
Copa América
Third place	2019 Brazil
- * Club domestic league appearances and goals as of 17 October 2026 (UTC) ‡ National team caps and goals as of 14 November 2025 (UTC)

Juan Marcos Foyth (born 12 January 1998) is an Argentine professional footballer who plays as centre-back or right-back for La Liga club Villarreal and the Argentina national team.

Having begun his professional career at his hometown club Estudiantes, he went on to play in the Premier League for Tottenham Hotspur and in La Liga for Villarreal. He won the UEFA Europa League with the latter club in 2021.

Foyth made his senior international debut for Argentina in 2018 and was part of their squad that came third at the 2019 Copa América and won the 2022 Finalissima and 2022 FIFA World Cup.

== Club career ==
=== Estudiantes ===
Born in La Plata, Buenos Aires Province, Foyth began his career at hometown club Estudiantes de La Plata. He played for a number of years in the Youth academy, initially as an attacking midfielder, then moved to centre-back before he turned 16. He signed his first professional contract in January 2017, which linked him to the club until June 2019. He made his Primera División debut on 19 March 2017, against Patronato, aged 19. He went on to play a further six times in the league, with additional two appearances in the Copa Sudamericana.

=== Tottenham Hotspur ===
Foyth joined Tottenham Hotspur for a reported £8 million on 30 August 2017, on a five-year contract. He made his debut on 19 September in an EFL Cup match against Barnsley that Tottenham won 1–0.

Foyth made his Premier League debut on 3 November 2018 in a 3–2 away win against Wolverhampton Wanderers, where he conceded two penalties which were both converted. In his next league appearance, away to Crystal Palace, he scored his first career goal, handing Tottenham a 1–0 victory. On 4 May 2019, he came on at half time for Toby Alderweireld and was sent off three minutes later for a foul on Jack Simpson in a 1–0 loss against AFC Bournemouth.

=== Villarreal ===
In October 2020, Foyth signed a new contract with Tottenham until 2023, only to be sent on loan to Spanish club Villarreal. He made his debut on 22 October, scoring in a 5–3 home victory against Turkey's Sivasspor in the group stage of the UEFA Europa League. He made 11 more appearances in the tournament as his team won it, including a start in the final victory against Manchester United.

At the end of his loan season, Foyth signed for Villarreal in June 2021 on a five-year deal for a fee of €15 million. On 16 August, he was sent off in a goalless draw at Granada CF in the opening game of the season. He became a key player at right-back for manager Unai Emery, replacing veteran Mario Gaspar and covering for the injured Serge Aurier. On 12 May 2022, he scored his first La Liga goal, to restore the lead in a 5–1 victory against Rayo Vallecano.

== International career ==
=== Early career ===
Foyth played for the Argentina national under-20 team in 2017. He made 12 appearances in total for the national youth team: nine at the 2017 South American Youth Football Championship in Ecuador, and another three during the 2017 FIFA U-20 World Cup.

=== Senior ===
Foyth received his first call-up to the Argentina senior national team by manager Lionel Scaloni for some friendly games which would be played in October 2018. He made his debut on 16 November in a friendly match against Mexico where he helped Argentina to a 2–0 victory, being named man of the match and receiving wide praise for his performance in this match.

Foyth was included in the final 23-man squad for the 2019 Copa América and made his first start against Qatar of said tournament. He started as a right-back in three further games, including the 2–0 semi-final loss against Brazil, and the third-place play-off match against Chile, which they won 2–1.

On 1 June 2022, Foyth remained as an unused substitute as Argentina won 3–0 against reigning European Champions Italy at Wembley Stadium in the 2022 Finalissima.

Foyth was named in Argentina's final 26-man squad for the 2022 FIFA World Cup in Qatar by Scaloni. He only played in the semi-final against Croatia. As Argentina were already up 3–0, Foyth came in to replace Nahuel Molina. He was an unused substitute as Argentina won the World Cup by defeating France 4–2 in a penalty shoot-out of the final.

== Personal life ==
Foyth, who was born and raised in Argentina, is of Czech and Polish descent and holds a Polish passport. He also holds Spanish nationality. His grandparents' surname was spelled Fojt, which was changed on arrival in Argentina. Foyth married his long-time girlfriend Ariana Alonso in La Plata, Argentina, in July 2019.

== Career statistics ==
=== Club ===
As of match played 17 October 2026

Appearances and goals by club, season and competition
Club	Season	League			National cup (Note: Includes FA Cup, Copa del Rey)		League cup (Note: Includes EFL Cup)		Continental		Other		Total	
Club	Season	Division	Apps	Goals	Apps	Goals	Apps	Goals	Apps	Goals	Apps	Goals	Apps	Goals
Estudiantes	2016–17	Argentine Primera División	7	0	0	0	—		2 (Note: Appearances in Copa Sudamericana)	0	—		9	0
Tottenham Hotspur	2017–18	Premier League	0	0	5	0	2	0	1 (Note: Appearance(s) in UEFA Champions League)	0	—		8	0
Tottenham Hotspur	2018–19	Premier League	12	1	2	0	1	0	2	0	—		17	1
Tottenham Hotspur	2019–20	Premier League	4	0	0	0	0	0	3	0	—		7	0
Tottenham Hotspur	Total		16	1	7	0	3	0	6	0	—		32	1
Villarreal (loan)	2020–21	La Liga	16	0	4	0	—		12 (Note: Appearances in UEFA Europa League)	1	—		32	1
Villarreal	2021–22	La Liga	25	1	2	0	—		10	0	1 (Note: Appearance in UEFA Super Cup)	0	38	1
Villarreal	2022–23	La Liga	24	1	3	0	—		3 (Note: Appearances in UEFA Europa Conference League)	0	—		30	1
Villarreal	2023–24	La Liga	12	1	1	0	—		3	0	—		16	1
Villarreal	2024–25	La Liga	19	1	0	0	—		—		—		19	1
Villarreal	2025–26	La Liga	13	0	1	0	—		4	0	—		18	0
Villarreal	2026–27	La Liga	5	0	0	0	—		1	0	—		6	0
Villarreal	Villarreal total		114	4	11	0	—		33	1	1	0	159	5
Career total			137	5	18	0	3	0	41	1	1	0	200	6

=== International ===
As of match played 14 November 2025

Appearances and goals by national team and year
National team	Year	Apps	Goals
Argentina	2018	1	0
Argentina	2019	9	0
Argentina	2020	1	0
Argentina	2021	2	0
Argentina	2022	4	0
Argentina	2023	1	0
Argentina	2024	0	0
Argentina	2025	4	0
Total		22	0

== Honours ==
Tottenham Hotspur

- UEFA Champions League runner-up: 2018–19

Villarreal

- UEFA Europa League: 2020–21

Argentina

- FIFA World Cup: 2022
- CONMEBOL–UEFA Cup of Champions: 2022
