= Jorge Cuenca =

Spanish footballer (born 1999)

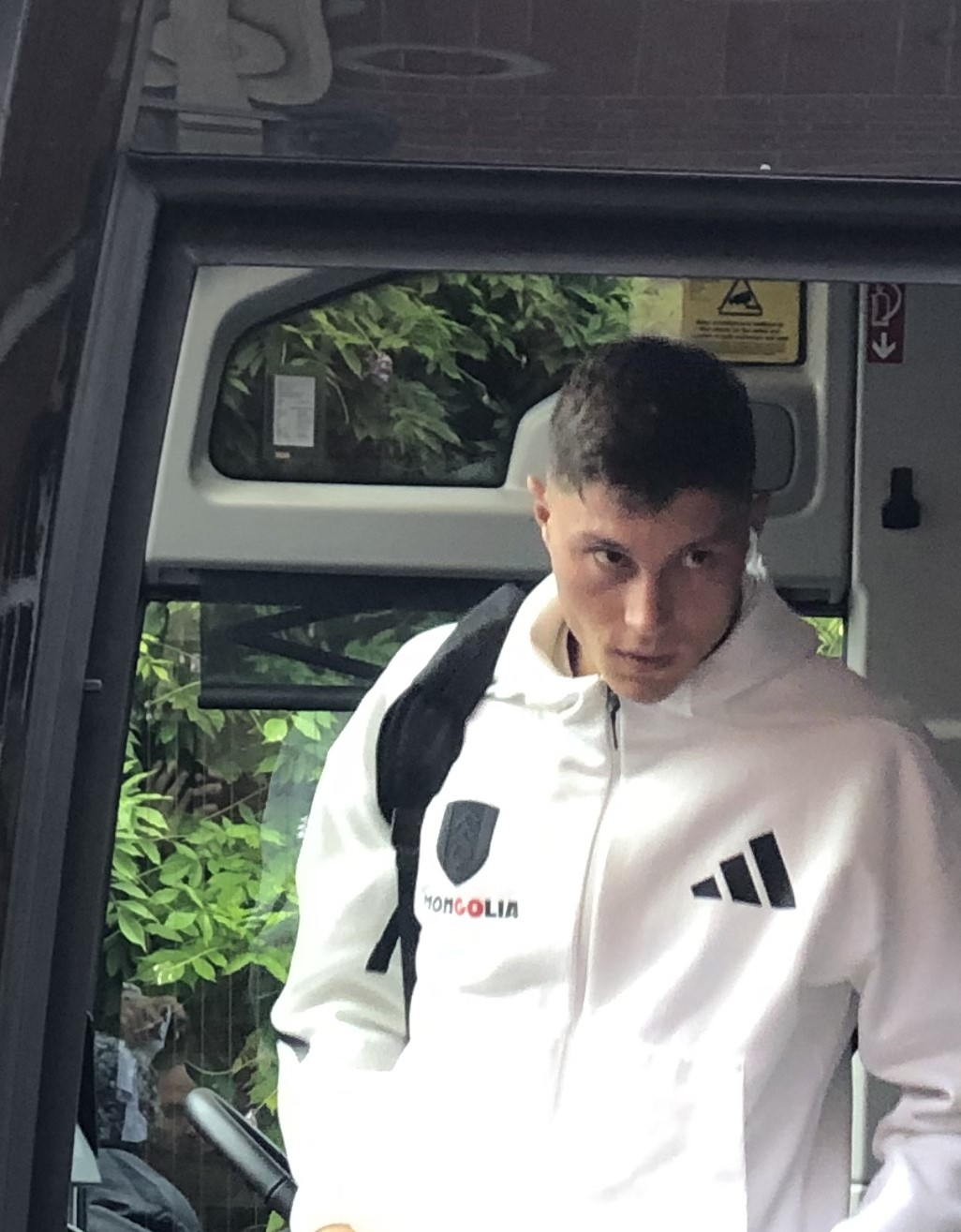
- Cuenca with Fulham in 2024

Personal information
- Full name: Jorge Cuenca Barreno
- Date of birth: 17 November 1999 (age 26)
- Place of birth: Madrid, Spain
- Height: 1.90 m (6 ft 3 in)
- Positions: Centre-back; left-back

Team information
- Current team: Fulham
- Number: 4

Youth career
- 2015–2017: Alcorcón

Senior career*
Years	Team	Apps	(Gls)
2017	Alcorcón B	8	(0)
2017	Alcorcón	5	(0)
2017–2020	Barcelona B	65	(3)
2018–2020	Barcelona	0	(0)
2020–2024	Villarreal	39	(3)
2020–2021	→ Almería (loan)	35	(3)
2021–2022	→ Getafe (loan)	32	(1)
2024–	Fulham	23	(0)

International career
2017–2018	Spain U19	7	(0)
2019–2021	Spain U21	12	(0)
- * Club domestic league appearances and goals as of 22:06, 24 August 2026 (UTC)

Jorge Cuenca Barreno (Spanish pronunciation: [ˈxoɾxe ˈkweŋka]; born 17 November 1999) is a Spanish professional footballer who plays as a centre-back or left-back for Premier League club Fulham.

== Club career ==
=== Alcorcón ===
Born in Madrid, Cuenca joined Alcorcón's youth setup in 2015. He made his senior debut with the reserves on 12 February 2017, starting in a 1–0 Tercera División home win against Villanueva del Pardillo.

Cuenca played his first professional match on 10 March 2017, starting in a 0–0 away draw against Elche in the Segunda División. At the age of 17 years and 114 days, he became the youngest player to debut for the club.

=== Barcelona ===
On 18 July 2017 Cuenca signed a two-year contract with Barcelona's reserve team Barcelona B, still in the second division, for a fee of €400,000. He featured sparingly for the side during his first season, which ended in relegation.

On 20 October 2018, Cuenca scored his first goal for the club, netting a last-minute equaliser for Barça B in a 1–1 home draw against Villarreal B in the Segunda División B. Eleven days later, he made his first-team debut, starting in a 1–0 away success over Cultural Leonesa in the 2018–19 Copa del Rey.

On 15 February 2019, Cuenca renewed his contract with the Catalans until 2021. On 1 September 2019, Cuenca scored the first official goal at the Johan Cruyff Stadium, receiving a commemorative plate.

=== Villarreal ===
On 22 September 2020, Barcelona and Villarreal reached an agreement for the transfer of Cuenca, for a fee of €2.5 million plus €4 million in variables; Barça also retained 20% over a future sale. He agreed to a five-year contract with the club, but was immediately loaned to Almería of the second division for a year.

Cuenca scored his first professional goal on 8 November 2020, netting the game's only in an away success over Rayo Vallecano. A regular starter for the Andalusians during the campaign, he scored three times as his side missed out promotion in the play-offs.

On 30 August 2021, Cuenca moved to fellow top-tier side Getafe on a one-year loan deal. He made his debut in the category on 13 September in a 1–0 away loss against Elche, and scored his first goal on 21 November in a 4–0 home routing of Cádiz.

=== Fulham ===
On 3 August 2024, Cuenca signed for Premier League club Fulham.

== International career ==
Due to the isolation of some national team players following the positive COVID-19 test of Sergio Busquets, Spain's under-21 squad were called up for the international friendly against Lithuania on 8 June 2021.

== Personal life ==
Cuenca's younger brother, David, plays for Real Madrid's youth setup.

== Career statistics ==
As of match played 24 August 2026

Appearances and goals by club, season and competition
Club	Season	League			National cup		League cup		Continental		Other		Total	
Club	Season	Division	Apps	Goals	Apps	Goals	Apps	Goals	Apps	Goals	Apps	Goals	Apps	Goals
Alcorcón B	2016–17	Tercera División	8	0	—		—		—		—		8	0
Alcorcón	2016–17	Segunda División	5	0	0	0	—		—		—		5	0
Barcelona B	2017–18	Segunda División	23	0	—		—		—		—		23	0
Barcelona B	2018–19	Segunda División B	28	1	—		—		—		—		28	1
Barcelona B	2019–20	Segunda División B	14	2	—		—		—		3 (Note: Three appearances in Segunda División B play-offs)	0	17	2
Barcelona B	Total		65	3	—		—		—		3	0	68	3
Barcelona	2018–19	La Liga	0	0	1	0	—		0	0	0	0	1	0
Barcelona	2019–20	La Liga	0	0	0	0	—		0	0	0	0	0	0
Barcelona	Total		0	0	1	0	—		0	0	0	0	1	0
Almería (loan)	2020–21	La Liga	35	3	2	0	—		—		—		37	3
Villarreal	2021–22	La Liga	0	0	—		—		—		0	0	0	0
Villarreal	2022–23	La Liga	10	0	3	0	—		10 (Note: Appearances in UEFA Conference League)	0	0	0	23	0
Villarreal	2023–24	La Liga	29	3	3	0	—		5 (Note: Appearances in UEFA Europa League)	0	0	0	37	3
Villarreal	Total		39	3	6	0	—		15	0	0	0	60	3
Getafe (loan)	2021–22	La Liga	32	1	0	0	—		—		—		32	1
Fulham	2024–25	Premier League	8	0	2	0	2	0	—		—		12	0
Fulham	2025–26	Premier League	14	0	3	0	3	0	—		—		20	0
Fulham	2026–27	Premier League	1	0	0	0	0	0	—		—		1	0
Fulham	Total		23	0	5	0	5	0	—		—		33	0
Career total			207	10	14	0	5	0	15	0	3	0	244	10

== Honours ==
Barcelona

- UEFA Youth League: 2017–18

Individual

- UEFA European Under-21 Championship Team of the Tournament: 2021
