= Filip Jörgensen =

Danish footballer (born 2002)

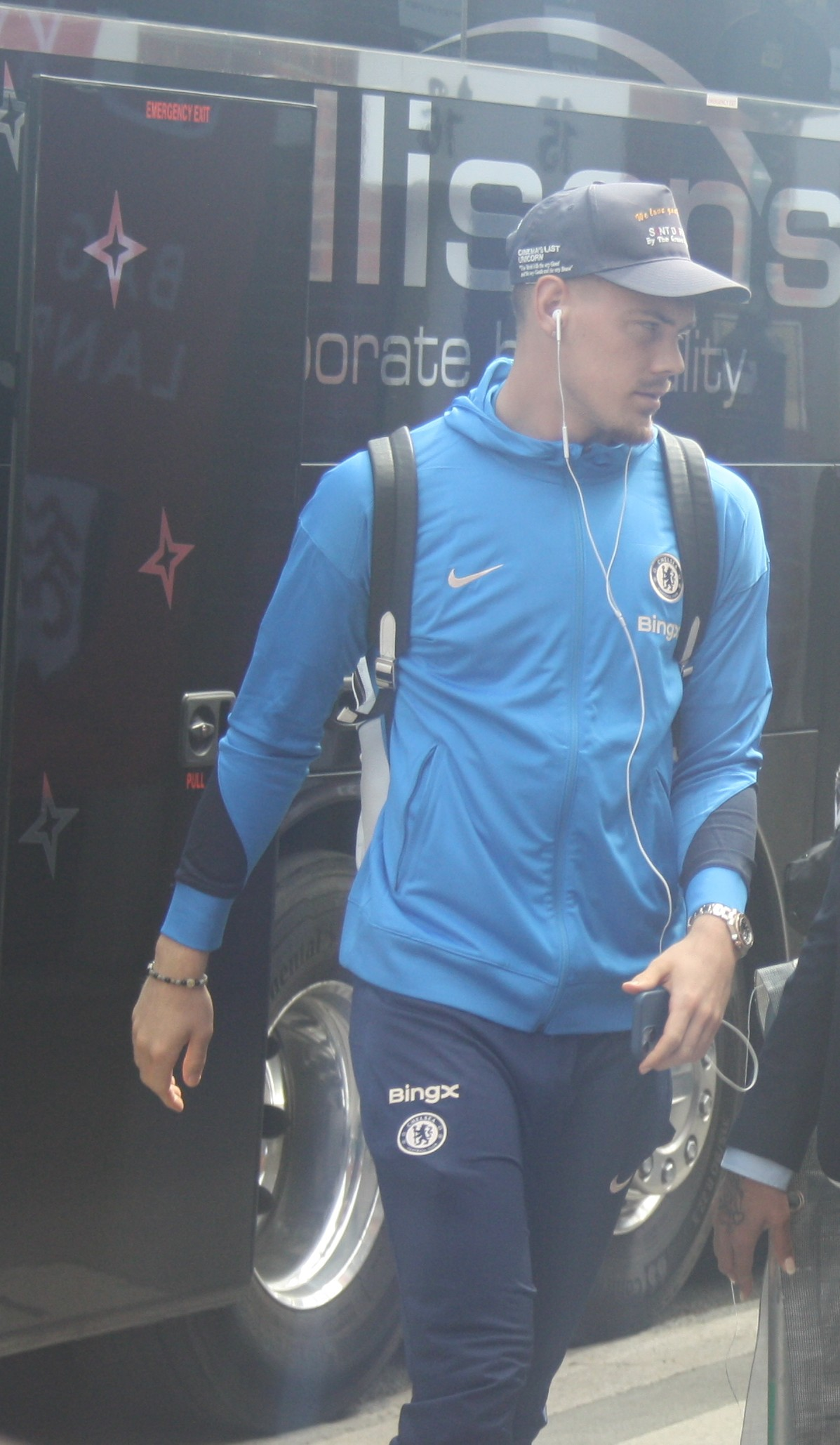
- Jörgensen with Chelsea in 2025

Personal information
- Date of birth: 16 April 2002 (age 24)
- Place of birth: Lomma, Sweden
- Height: 1.90 m (6 ft 3 in)
- Position: Goalkeeper

Team information
- Current team: Strasbourg (on loan from Chelsea)
- Number: 1

Youth career
- 2007–2008: GIF Nike
- 2008–2014: Malmö FF
- 2014: Santa Catalina
- 2014–2015: Penya Arrabal
- 2015–2016: Malmö FF
- 2016–2017: Mallorca
- 2017–2020: Villarreal

Senior career*
Years	Team	Apps	(Gls)
2020–2023	Villarreal B	41	(0)
2023–2024	Villarreal	38	(0)
2024–	Chelsea	11	(0)
2026–	→ Strasbourg (loan)	11	(0)

International career^{‡}
2018	Sweden U17	8	(0)
2019–2020	Sweden U19	3	(0)
2021–2024	Denmark U21	14	(0)
2025–	Denmark	4	(0)
- * Club domestic league appearances and goals as of 23:39, 21 November 2026 (UTC) ‡ National team caps and goals as of 17:55, 27 September 2026 (UTC)

Filip Jörgensen (born 16 April 2002) is a professional footballer who plays as a goalkeeper for Ligue 1 club Strasbourg, on loan from Premier League club Chelsea. Born in Sweden, he plays for the Denmark national team.

== Club career ==
=== Early career ===
Born in Lomma, Jörgensen began his career with GIF Nike before joining Malmö FF at the age of six. When he was twelve, his family moved to the island of Mallorca where he played with local teams AD Penya Arrabal and Santa Catalina Atlético. The family returned to Sweden after one year in Spain, and Jörgensen continued playing with Malmö FF, before being invited back to the island by La Liga club Mallorca, whose academy he joined. After one year he joined Villarreal's youth setup in 2017.

=== Villarreal ===
==== B-team and first team debut ====
Jörgensen made his senior debut with the reserves on 18 October 2020, starting in a 0–1 away loss against SCR Peña Deportiva. On 12 November, he renewed his contract until 2025.

Jörgensen made his first team debut on 15 December 2021, coming on as a second-half substitute for Gerónimo Rulli in a 7–1 away victory against Atlético Sanluqueño CF, for the season's Copa del Rey. He made his professional debut with the B-side on 14 August 2022, starting in a 2–0 Segunda División away victory against Racing de Santander.

==== Breakthrough ====
Jörgensen made his La Liga debut on 30 January 2023, starting in a 1–0 home loss against Rayo Vallecano. In August, he was promoted to the main squad, being assigned the number 13 jersey. In the 2023–24 season, he became the goalkeeper with most saves in La Liga in 143 occasions. On 13 June 2024, he extended his contract until 2029.

=== Chelsea ===
On 30 July 2024, Jörgensen joined Premier League club Chelsea for a reported fee of around £20m, signing a seven-year deal.

==== Loan to Strasbourg ====
On 11 August 2026, Jörgensen joined Ligue 1 side Strasbourg on loan for the 2026–27 season.

== International career ==
Jörgensen was born in Sweden to a Swedish mother and a Danish father. He represented Sweden at under-17 and under-19 levels before switching allegiance to Denmark in May 2021.

On 7 June 2025, Jörgensen made his debut for the Denmark national team in a friendly match against Northern Ireland. Despite an early own goal from teammate Pierre-Emile Højbjerg, Denmark won the game 2–1 with Jörgensen playing the full match.

== Career statistics ==
=== Club ===
As of match played 21 November 2026

Appearances and goals by club, season and competition
Club	Season	League			National cup (Note: Includes Copa del Rey, FA Cup)		League cup (Note: Includes EFL Cup)		Europe		Other		Total	
Club	Season	Division	Apps	Goals	Apps	Goals	Apps	Goals	Apps	Goals	Apps	Goals	Apps	Goals
Villarreal B	2020–21	Segunda División B	16	0	—		—		—		—		16	0
Villarreal B	2021–22	Primera Federación	14	0	—		—		—		—		14	0
Villarreal B	2022–23	Segunda División	11	0	—		—		—		—		11	0
Villarreal B	Total		41	0	—		—		—		—		41	0
Villarreal	2020–21	La Liga	0	0	0	0	—		0	0	—		0	0
Villarreal	2021–22	La Liga	0	0	1	0	—		0	0	0	0	1	0
Villarreal	2022–23	La Liga	2	0	1	0	—		3 (Note: Appearances in UEFA (Europa) Conference League)	0	—		6	0
Villarreal	2023–24	La Liga	36	0	0	0	—		1 (Note: Appearance in UEFA Europa League)	0	—		37	0
Villarreal	Total		38	0	2	0	—		4	0	—		44	0
Chelsea	2024–25	Premier League	6	0	1	0	2	0	14	0	1 (Note: Appearance in FIFA Club World Cup)	0	24	0
Chelsea	2025–26	Premier League	5	0	1	0	3	0	3 (Note: Appearances in UEFA Champions League)	0	—		12	0
Chelsea	Total		11	0	2	0	5	0	17	0	1	0	36	0
Strasbourg (loan)	2026–27	Ligue 1	11	0	0	0	—		—		—		11	0
Career total			101	0	4	0	5	0	21	0	1	0	132	0

=== International ===
As of match played 27 September 2026

Appearances and goals by national team and year
National team	Year	Apps	Goals
Denmark	2025	1	0
Denmark	2026	3	0
Total		4	0

== Honours ==
Villarreal

- UEFA Europa League: 2020–21

Chelsea

- UEFA Conference League: 2024–25
- FIFA Club World Cup: 2025
- FA Cup runner-up: 2025–26

Individual

- UEFA Conference League Team of the Season: 2024–25
