= Manu Morlanes =

Spanish footballer (born 1999)

Personal information
- Full name: Manuel Morlanes Ariño
- Date of birth: 12 January 1999 (age 27)
- Place of birth: Zaragoza, Spain
- Height: 1.78 m (5 ft 10 in)
- Position: Central midfielder

Team information
- Current team: Mallorca
- Number: 8

Youth career
- Zaragoza
- 2012–2015: Villarreal

Senior career*
Years	Team	Apps	(Gls)
2015–2017	Villarreal C	41	(2)
2016–2019	Villarreal B	38	(2)
2017–2023	Villarreal	23	(0)
2020–2021	→ Almería (loan)	36	(1)
2021–2022	→ Espanyol (loan)	27	(2)
2023	→ Mallorca (loan)	12	(1)
2023–	Mallorca	97	(3)

International career
2015	Spain U16	4	(1)
2014–2016	Spain U17	25	(3)
2016–2018	Spain U19	9	(0)
2019	Spain U21	1	(0)
- * Club domestic league appearances and goals as of 27 September 2026

Manuel "Manu" Morlanes Ariño (born 12 January 1999) is a Spanish professional footballer who plays as a central midfielder for La Liga club Mallorca.

== Club career ==
Born in Zaragoza, Morlanes represented local Real Zaragoza as a youth before switching to Villarreal CF's academy in the summer of 2012. He made his debut with the C-team in the 2015–16 Tercera División campaign.

On 3 September 2016, Morlanes made his debut for the B-team in a 3–2 defeat against FC Barcelona B. He suffered a knee injury during a match against CD Castellón in December, returning to play in September 2017 in a 0–0 draw against UE Llagostera.

Morlanes made his first-team debut on 8 December 2017, starting in a 1–0 defeat against Maccabi Tel Aviv in UEFA Europa League. The following 13 June, he renewed his contract until 2023.

Morlanes made his La Liga debut on 18 August 2018, starting in a 2–1 home loss against Real Sociedad. Ahead of the 2019–20 campaign, he was definitely promoted to the main squad.

On 7 September 2020, Morlanes was loaned to Segunda División side UD Almería for one year, with a buyout clause. After being a regular starter, Almería exercised the buyout clause on his contract, but Villarreal also activated the buy-back clause to retain the player.

On 16 August 2021, Morlanes signed a new contract with the Yellow Submarine until 2026, and joined fellow top tier side RCD Espanyol on loan for the 2021–22 season. Back to his parent club for the 2022–23 campaign, he featured rarely before moving to RCD Mallorca also in the top tier on 31 January 2023, also in a temporary deal.

On 30 June 2023, Morlanes signed a permanent five-year deal with the Bermellones.

== Career statistics ==
As of 27 September 2026

Appearances and goals by club, season and competition
Club	Season	League			Cup		Continental		Other		Total	
Club	Season	Division	Apps	Goals	Apps	Goals	Apps	Goals	Apps	Goals	Apps	Goals
Villarreal C	2015–16	Tercera División	28	0	—		—		—		28	0
Villarreal C	2016–17	Tercera División	13	2	—		—		—		13	2
Villarreal C	Total		41	2	—		—		—		41	2
Villarreal B	2016–17	Segunda División B	3	0	—		—		—		3	0
Villarreal B	2017–18	Segunda División B	27	1	—		—		6 (Note: Appearance(s) in Segunda División B promotion play-offs)	0	33	1
Villarreal B	2018–19	Segunda División B	8	1	—		—		2	0	10	1
Villarreal B	Total		38	2	—		—		8	0	46	2
Villarreal	2017–18	La Liga	0	0	0	0	1 (Note: Appearance(s) in UEFA Europa League)	0	—		1	0
Villarreal	2018–19	La Liga	10	0	1	0	5	1	—		16	1
Villarreal	2019–20	La Liga	9	0	4	0	0	0	—		13	0
Villarreal	2021–22	La Liga	0	0	0	0	0	0	1 (Note: Appearance in UEFA Super Cup)	0	1	0
Villarreal	2022–23	La Liga	4	0	3	0	7 (Note: Appearance(s) in UEFA Conference League)	0	—		17	0
Villarreal	Total		23	0	8	0	13	1	1	0	48	1
Almería (loan)	2020–21	Segunda División	36	1	1	0	—		2 (Note: Appearance(s) in La Liga play-offs)	0	39	1
Espanyol (loan)	2021–22	La Liga	27	2	3	0	—		—		30	2
Mallorca (loan)	2022–23	La Liga	12	1	—		—		—		12	1
Mallorca	2023–24	La Liga	35	0	6	0	—		—		41	0
Mallorca	2024–25	La Liga	23	0	0	0	—		1 (Note: Appearance in Supercopa de España)	0	24	0
Mallorca	2025–26	La Liga	31	3	1	0	—		—		32	3
Mallorca	2026–27	Segunda División	7	0	0	0	—		—		7	0
Mallorca	Total		97	3	7	0	—		1	0	104	3
Career total			293	11	19	0	13	1	12	0	320	12

== Honours ==
Spain U17

- UEFA European Under-17 Championship runner-up: 2016

Individual

- UEFA European Under-17 Championship Team of the Tournament: 2016
