= Álex Millán =

Spanish footballer

Personal information
- Full name: Alejandro Millán Iranzo
- Date of birth: 7 November 1999 (age 27)
- Place of birth: Zaragoza, Spain
- Height: 1.82 m (6 ft 0 in)
- Position: Forward

Team information
- Current team: Leganés
- Number: 9

Youth career
- 2009–2016: Zaragoza
- 2016–2017: Villarreal

Senior career*
Years	Team	Apps	(Gls)
2017–2019	Villarreal C	38	(16)
2019–2023	Villarreal B	60	(17)
2020–2023	Villarreal	1	(0)
2021–2022	→ Cercle Brugge (loan)	18	(3)
2022	→ Union SG (loan)	8	(1)
2022–2023	→ Famalicão (loan)	13	(2)
2023–2024	Oviedo	8	(0)
2024–2025	Farense	9	(0)
2025	Cartagena	19	(6)
2025–	Leganés	37	(7)

International career
2015–2016	Spain U17	8	(0)
2017	Spain U18	2	(0)
- * Club domestic league appearances and goals as of 9 June 2026

Alejandro "Álex" Millán Iranzo (born 7 November 1999) is a Spanish professional footballer who plays as a forward for CD Leganés.

== Club career ==
Born in Zaragoza, Aragon, Millán joined Real Zaragoza's youth setup in 2009, aged nine. In July 2016, he moved to Villarreal CF for a fee of €350,000, signing a contract until 2020.

On 27 August 2017, while still a youth, Millán made his senior debut with the C-team, coming on as a late substitute for Andrei Rațiu in a 0–0 Tercera División away draw against Crevillente Deportivo. He was definitely promoted to the C-side ahead of the 2018–19 campaign, and scored his first senior goals on 12 October 2018, netting a hat-trick in a 4–2 home win against CD Acero.

Millán was promoted to the reserves in 2019, in Segunda División B. He made his first team debut on 16 December of the following year; after replacing Dani Raba in the 78th minute, he scored his team's fifth in a 6–0 away routing of SD Leioa, for the season's Copa del Rey.

Millán made his La Liga debut on 19 December 2020, replacing fellow youth graduate Gerard Moreno in a 3–1 away success over CA Osasuna. The following 13 August, he moved abroad and joined Belgian First Division A club Cercle Brugge KSV on loan for one year. Following the signing of fellow striker Silvère Ganvoula in January 2022, his loan was taken over by league leaders Royale Union Saint-Gilloise on 28 January.

On 8 July 2022, Millán was loaned to Famalicão in Portugal for the 2022–23 season. The following 7 January, his loan was terminated, and he returned to the B-team in Segunda División.

On 27 June 2023, Millán signed a two-year contract with fellow second division side Real Oviedo, but suffered a knee injury in the pre-season which led him to miss most part of the season. On 20 August of the following year, he returned to the Portuguese top tier after signing a two-year deal with SC Farense.

On 23 January 2025, Millán returned to his home country after agreeing to a short-term deal with FC Cartagena in the second division, with an option to extend. On 27 June, he moved to CD Leganés in the same tier on a two-year contract.

== Career statistics ==
=== Club ===
As of match played 30 January 2022

Appearances and goals by club, season and competition
Club	Season	League			National Cup		Other		Total	
Club	Season	Division	Apps	Goals	Apps	Goals	Apps	Goals	Apps	Goals
Villarreal B	2019–20	Segunda División B	18	3	—		—		18	3
Villarreal B	2020–21	Segunda División B	22	10	—		—		22	10
Villarreal B	Total		40	13	0	0	0	0	40	13
Villarreal	2020–21	La Liga	1	0	1	1	—		2	1
Villarreal	2021–22	La Liga	0	0	0	0	—		0	0
Villarreal	Total		1	0	1	1	0	0	2	1
Cercle Brugge (loan)	2021–22	First Division A	18	3	2	0	—		20	3
Union SG	2021–22	First Division A	1	0	0	0	—		1	0
Career total			60	3	3	1	0	0	63	17
