= Lanchi =

Spanish footballer

Personal information
- Full name: José Manuel Cabrera López
- Date of birth: 23 June 2001 (age 25)
- Place of birth: Puerto Real, Spain
- Height: 1.75 m (5 ft 9 in)
- Position: Right back

Team information
- Current team: Marbella

Youth career
- 2011–2015: San Fernando
- 2015–2016: Río San Pedro
- 2016–2018: Balón de Cádiz
- 2018–2019: Cádiz
- 2019: Villarreal

Senior career*
Years	Team	Apps	(Gls)
2019–2021	Villarreal C	30	(0)
2020–2024	Villarreal B	41	(1)
2022–2023	→ San Fernando (loan)	32	(2)
2025	Cultural Leonesa	8	(1)
2025	Alcorcón	10	(0)
2026	Venados	0	(0)
2026–	Marbella	0	(0)

International career
2020	Spain U19	1	(0)
- * Club domestic league appearances and goals as of 1 December 2025

José Manuel Cabrera López (born 23 June 2001), commonly known as Lanchi, is a Spanish footballer who plays as a right back for Segunda Federación – Group 4 club Marbella.

== Club career ==
Born in Puerto Real, Cádiz, Andalusia, Lanchi joined Villarreal CF in May 2019, after representing Cádiz CF, Balón de Cádiz CF, UD Río San Pedro and San Fernando CD as a youth. Initially assigned to the youth setup, he made his senior debut with the C-team on 1 September 2019, starting in a 1–0 Tercera División home win over CD Olímpic de Xàtiva.

On 20 May 2020, after already establishing himself as a regular for the C's, Lanchi renewed his contract with the Yellow Submarine until 2024. He first appeared with the reserves on 29 November 2020, starting in a 1–1 home draw against Valencia CF Mestalla in the Segunda División B.

On 30 June 2022, after contributing with 11 appearances for the B-team as they achieved promotion to Segunda División, Lanchi returned to his first club San Fernando on loan, being now a part of the first team squad in Primera Federación. Back to the Yellow Submarine in July 2023, he made his professional debut on 26 August, starting in a 1–0 away loss to Elche CF.

Lanchi left Villarreal in May 2024 to return to Cádiz, but only trained with the side in November, without signing a contract. On 10 January 2025, he signed a short-term deal with Cultural y Deportiva Leonesa in Primera Federación.
