= Derbi de la Comunitat =

Football rivalry in Spain

- Location: (Valencian Community) Valencia, Villarreal
- Teams: Valencia CF; Villarreal CF
- First meeting: 17 September 1986; Copa del Rey; Villarreal 2–2 Valencia
- Latest meeting: 24 October 2026; La Liga; Valencia 1–2 Villarreal
- Next meeting: 21 February 2027; La Liga; Villarreal v Valencia
- Stadiums: Estadio de Mestalla (Valencia); Estadio de la Cerámica (Villarreal)

Statistics
- Total meetings: 64 (official)
- Most wins: Valencia (25)
- Largest victory: Valencia 6–0 Villarreal (14 April 1993)

The Derbi de la Comunitat ("Derby of the Community"), or the Valencian Country Derby, is a regional football rivalry in Spain between La Liga clubs Valencia CF and Villarreal CF. Separated by 35 miles (56 km), historically the clubs maintained a friendly relationship since they were always in different divisions and rarely faced each other.

However, a rivalry began in 1997 when billionaire Fernando Roig failed to succeed his brother Francisco as the owner of Valencia CF and controversially opted instead to buy Villarreal CF from the city of Villarreal. A relatively unknown team up to that point, Villarreal grew increasingly stronger under Roig's heavy investment, challenging Valencia's supremacy as the biggest club of the region, converting a once non-existent rivalry into the most important game in the autonomous community.

The rivalry includes a 2004 UEFA Cup semi-final and a 2019 UEFA Europa League quarter-final. Valencia won both series.

== Head-to-head statistics ==
As of 24 October 2026

| Competition | Pld | VAL | D | VIL | VaG | ViG |
|---|---|---|---|---|---|---|
| La Liga | 53 | 18 | 11 | 24 | 67 | 72 |
| Copa del Rey | 7 | 4 | 2 | 1 | 15 | 7 |
| UEFA Cup / UEFA Europa League | 4 | 3 | 1 | 0 | 6 | 1 |
| Total | 64 | 25 | 14 | 25 | 88 | 80 |

== All-time results ==
=== League ===
| Season | Division | Valencia vs Villarreal | | | | Villarreal vs Valencia | | | |
| Season | Division | Date | Venue | Score | Attendance | Date | Venue | Score | Attendance |
|---|---|---|---|---|---|---|---|---|---|
| 1998–99 | La Liga | 20 Sep 1998 | Mestalla | 1–0 | 45,000 | 14 Feb 1999 | El Madrigal | 1–0 | 14,000 |
| 2000–01 | La Liga | 25 Feb 2001 | Mestalla | 3–1 | 52,000 | 14 Oct 2000 | El Madrigal | 1–1 | 16,000 |
| 2001–02 | La Liga | 7 Oct 2001 | Mestalla | 1–0 | 45,000 | 16 Feb 2002 | El Madrigal | 1–1 | 21,000 |
| 2002-03 | La Liga | 11 May 2003 | Mestalla | 1–2 | 43,000 | 14 Dec 2002 | El Madrigal | 0–2 | 22,000 |
| 2003–04 | La Liga | 4 Jan 2004 | Mestalla | 4–2 | 40,000 | 14 May 2004 | El Madrigal | 2–1 | 11,256 |
| 2004–05 | La Liga | 30 Aug 2004 | Mestalla | 2–1 | 50,000 | 23 Jan 2005 | El Madrigal | 3–1 | 21,000 |
| 2005–06 | La Liga | 22 Mar 2006 | Mestalla | 1–1 | 51,000 | 5 Nov 2005 | El Madrigal | 1–0 | 18,000 |
| 2006–07 | La Liga | 26 May 2007 | Mestalla | 2–3 | 44,000 | 7 Jan 2007 | El Madrigal | 0–1 | 23,000 |
| 2007–08 | La Liga | 26 Aug 2007 | Mestalla | 0–3 | 55,000 | 19 Jan 2008 | El Madrigal | 3–0 | 19,000 |
| 2008–09 | La Liga | 10 Jan 2009 | Mestalla | 3–3 | 40,000 | 23 May 2009 | El Madrigal | 3–1 | 20,000 |
| 2009–10 | La Liga | 17 Jan 2010 | Mestalla | 4–1 | 40,000 | 8 May 2010 | El Madrigal | 2–0 | 17,000 |
| 2010–11 | La Liga | 10 Apr 2011 | Mestalla | 5–0 | 45,000 | 20 Nov 2010 | El Madrigal | 1–1 | 23,000 |
| 2011–12 | La Liga | 5 May 2012 | Mestalla | 1–0 | 35,000 | 8 Jan 2012 | El Madrigal | 2–2 | 18,000 |
| 2013–14 | La Liga | 23 Mar 2014 | Mestalla | 2–1 | 37,214 | 27 Oct 2013 | El Madrigal | 4–1 | 22,539 |
| 2014–15 | La Liga | 5 Apr 2015 | Mestalla | 0–0 | 49,545 | 2 Nov 2014 | El Madrigal | 1–3 | 23,000 |
| 2015–16 | La Liga | 1 May 2016 | Mestalla | 0–2 | 38,283 | 31 Dec 2015 | El Madrigal | 1–0 | 17,616 |
| 2016–17 | La Liga | 21 May 2017 | Mestalla | 1–3 | 33,587 | 21 Jan 2017 | Estadio de la Cerámica | 0–2 | 17,615 |
| 2017–18 | La Liga | 23 Dec 2017 | Mestalla | 0–1 | 39,181 | 5 May 2018 | Estadio de la Cerámica | 1–0 | 18,579 |
| 2018–19 | La Liga | 1 May 2019 | Mestalla | 3–0 | 37,658 | 23 Sep 2018 | Estadio de la Cerámica | 0–0 | 18,373 |
| 2019–20 | La Liga | 30 Nov 2019 | Mestalla | 2–1 | 38,521 | 28 Jun 2020 | Estadio de la Cerámica | 2–0 | 0 |
| 2020–21 | La Liga | 5 Mar 2021 | Mestalla | 2–1 | 0 | 18 Oct 2020 | Estadio de la Cerámica | 2–1 | 0 |
| 2021–22 | La Liga | 30 Oct 2021 | Mestalla | 2–0 | 31,487 | 19 Apr 2022 | Estadio de la Cerámica | 2–0 | 13,570 |
| 2022–23 | La Liga | 3 May 2023 | Mestalla | 1–1 | 43,634 | 31 Dec 2022 | Estadio de la Cerámica | 2–1 | 19,247 |
| 2023–24 | La Liga | 2 Jan 2024 | Mestalla | 3–1 | 44,973 | 17 Mar 2024 | Estadio de la Cerámica | 1–0 | 20,647 |
| 2024–25 | La Liga | 31 Aug 2024 | Mestalla | 1–1 | 43,857 | 15 Feb 2025 | Estadio de la Cerámica | 1–1 | 19,701 |
| 2025–26 | La Liga | 25 Oct 2025 | Mestalla | 0–2 | 45,560 | 22 Feb 2026 | Estadio de la Cerámica | 2–1 | 19,233 |
| 2026–27 | La Liga | 24 Oct 2026 | Mestalla | 1–2 | | 21 Feb 2027 | Estadio de la Cerámica | | |

=== Copa del Rey ===
| Season | Competition | Round | Date | Venue | Score | Attendance |
|---|---|---|---|---|---|---|
| 1986–87 | Copa del Rey | 1st round | 17 Sep 1986 | El Madrigal | 2–2 (4–3 p) | 10,000 |
| 1992–93 | Copa del Rey | Quarter-finals leg 1 | 24 Mar 1993 | El Madrigal | 1–2 | 6,000 |
| 1992–93 | Copa del Rey | Quarter-finals leg 2 | 14 Apr 1993 | Mestalla | 6–0 | 25,000 |
| 2005–06 | Copa del Rey | Round of 16 leg 1 | 04 Jan 2006 | El Madrigal | 0–2 | 18,000 |
| 2005–06 | Copa del Rey | Round of 16 leg 2 | 11 Jan 2006 | Mestalla | 1–0 | 35,000 |
| 2010–11 | Copa del Rey | Round of 16 leg 1 | 21 Dec 2010 | Mestalla | 0–0 | 20,000 |
| 2010–11 | Copa del Rey | Round of 16 leg 2 | 06 Jan 2011 | El Madrigal | 4–2 | 20,000 |

=== Europe ===
| Season | Competition | Round | Date | Venue | Score | Attendance |
|---|---|---|---|---|---|---|
| 2003–04 | UEFA Cup | Semi-finals leg 1 | 22 Apr 2004 | El Madrigal | 0–0 | 23,000 |
| 2003–04 | UEFA Cup | Semi-finals leg 2 | 06 May 2004 | Mestalla | 1–0 | 52,000 |
| 2018–19 | Europa League | Quarter-finals leg 1 | 11 Apr 2019 | Estadio de la Cerámica | 1–3 | 17,605 |
| 2018–19 | Europa League | Quarter-finals leg 2 | 18 Apr 2019 | Mestalla | 2–0 | 26,403 |
