= 2020–21 Villarreal CF season =

Villarreal
2020–21 season
- President: Fernando Roig
- Head coach: Unai Emery
- Stadium: Estadio de la Cerámica
- La Liga: 7th
- Copa del Rey: Quarter-finals
- UEFA Europa League: Winners
- Top goalscorer: League: Gerard (23); All: Gerard (30)
- Biggest win: Leioa 0–6 Villarreal
- Biggest defeat: Barcelona 4–0 Villarreal
Home colours	Away colours	Third colours

The 2020–21 season was the 98th season in the existence of Villarreal CF and the club's eighth consecutive season in the top flight of Spanish football. In addition to the domestic league, Villarreal participated in this season's editions of the Copa del Rey and the UEFA Europa League. The season covered the period from 20 July 2020 to 30 June 2021, with the late start to the season due to the COVID-19 pandemic in Spain.

The season was the first since 2005–06 without former captain Bruno Soriano, who retired after the 2019–20 season. On 23 July 2020, the club announced the appointment of three-time Europa League winner and former Spartak Moscow, Sevilla, Valencia, Paris Saint-Germain and Arsenal manager Unai Emery.

On 26 May 2021, Villarreal defeated Manchester United in the UEFA Europa League Final 11–10 on penalties following a 1–1 draw after extra time, winning the competition for the first time in club history.

== Players ==
As of 30 January 2021

No.	Player	Nat.	Position(s)	Date of birth (age)	Signed in	Contract ends	Signed from	Transfer fees	Apps.	Goals	Notes
Goalkeepers
1	Sergio Asenjo	(Spain)	GK	28 June 1989 (age 37)	2013	2022	(Spain) Atlético Madrid	Free transfer	222	0	
13	Gerónimo Rulli	(Argentina)	GK	20 May 1992 (age 34)	2020	2024	(Spain) Real Sociedad	€5m	2	0	
35	Filip Jörgensen	(Sweden)	GK	16 April 2002 (age 24)	2020	2025	(Spain) Villarreal B	Youth system	0	0	
Defenders
2	Mario Gaspar	(Spain)	DF	24 November 1990 (age 35)	2009	2023	(Spain) Villarreal B	Youth system	326	10	captain
3	Raúl Albiol	(Spain)	DF	4 September 1985 (age 41)	2019	2022	(Italy) Napoli	Free transfer	71	1	3rd captain
4	Pau Torres	(Spain)	DF	16 January 1997 (age 29)	2017	2024	(Spain) Villarreal B	Youth system	69	4	
6	Ramiro Funes Mori	(Argentina)	DF	5 March 1991 (age 35)	2018	2022	(England) Everton	£8.1m	48	2	
8	Juan Foyth	(Argentina)	DF	12 January 1998 (age 28)	2020	2021	(England) Tottenham Hotspur	On loan	16	0	
15	Pervis Estupiñán	(Ecuador)	DF	21 January 1998 (age 28)	2020	2027	(England) Watford	£15m	25	0	
18	Alberto Moreno	(Spain)	DF	5 July 1992 (age 34)	2019	2024	(England) Liverpool	Free transfer	23	0	
21	Jaume Costa	(Spain)	DF	18 March 1988 (age 38)	2012	2021	(Spain) Valencia Mestalla		211	5	
27	Lanchi	(Spain)	DF	23 June 2001 (age 25)	2020		(Spain) Villarreal B	Youth system	0	0	
44	Andrei Rațiu	(Romania)	DF	20 June 1998 (age 28)	2019		(Spain) Villarreal B	Youth system	0	0	
Midfielders
5	Dani Parejo	(Spain)	MF	16 April 1989 (age 37)	2020	2024	(Spain) Valencia	Free transfer	36	3	
10	Vicente Iborra	(Spain)	MF	16 January 1988 (age 38)	2019	2023	(England) Leicester City	£9m	66	4	vice-captain
11	Samuel Chukwueze	(Nigeria)	MF	22 May 1999 (age 27)	2018	2023	(Spain) Villarreal B	Youth system	91	12	
14	Manu Trigueros	(Spain)	MF	17 October 1991 (age 35)	2012		(Spain) Villarreal B	Youth system	294	19	
19	Francis Coquelin	(France)	MF	13 May 1991 (age 35)	2020	2024	(Spain) Valencia	€6.5m	22	0	
25	Étienne Capoue	(France)	MF	11 July 1988 (age 38)	2021	2023	(England) Watford		16	1	
28	Carlo Adriano	(Spain)	MF	12 February 2001 (age 25)	2020		(Spain) Villarreal B	Youth system	0	0	
32	Álex Baena	(Spain)	MF	20 July 2001 (age 25)	2019	2025	(Spain) Villarreal B	Youth system	7	0	
-	Ramiro Guerra	(Uruguay)	MF	21 March 1997 (age 29)	2017		(Spain) Villarreal B	Youth system	4	0	
Forwards
7	Gerard Moreno	(Spain)	FW	7 April 1992 (age 34)	2018	2023	(Spain) Espanyol	€20m	103	49	
9	Carlos Bacca	(Colombia)	FW	8 September 1986 (age 40)	2017	2022	(Italy) Milan	€7m	110	28	
12	Dani Raba	(Spain)	FW	29 October 1995 (age 31)	2017		(Spain) Villarreal B	Youth system	34	2	
17	Paco Alcácer	(Spain)	FW	30 August 1993 (age 33)	2020	2025	(Germany) Borussia Dortmund	€23m	40	10	
20	Rubén Peña	(Spain)	FW	18 July 1991 (age 35)	2019	2024	(Spain) Eibar	€8m	45	3	
23	Moi Gómez	(Spain)	FW	23 June 1994 (age 32)	2019	2023	(Spain) Sporting Gijón	€1.3m	72	9	
24	Alfonso Pedraza	(Spain)	FW	9 April 1996 (age 30)	2015		(Spain) Villarreal B	Youth system	67	4	
30	Yeremy Pino	(Spain)	FW	20 October 2002 (age 24)	2020	2024	(Spain) Villarreal B	Youth system	23	3	
34	Fer Niño	(Spain)	FW	24 October 2000 (age 26)	2020	2024	(Spain) Villarreal B	Youth system	22	3	
40	Álex Millán	(Spain)	FW	7 November 1999 (age 27)	2020		(Spain) Villarreal B	Youth system	1	0	
Players transferred during the season
16	Takefusa Kubo	(Japan)	MF	4 June 2001 (age 25)	2020	2021	(Spain) Real Madrid Castilla	On loan	13	0	
22	Sofian Chakla	(Morocco)	DF	2 September 1993 (age 33)	2020		(Spain) Villarreal B	Youth system	3	0	Out on loan

== Transfers ==
=== In ===
Date	Player	From	Type	Fee	Ref
20 July 2020	(Spain) Jaume Costa	Valencia	Loan return		
20 July 2020	(Spain) Alfonso Pedraza	Real Betis	Loan return		
20 July 2020	(Turkey) Enes Ünal	Valladolid	Loan return		
21 July 2020	(Spain) Enric Franquesa	Mirandés	Loan return		
21 July 2020	(Spain) Miguelón	Huesca	Loan return		
21 July 2020	(Spain) Dani Raba	Huesca	Loan return		
10 August 2020	(Japan) Takefusa Kubo	Real Madrid	Loan	€2.5M	
12 August 2020	(France) Francis Coquelin	Valencia	Transfer	€6.5M	
12 August 2020	(Spain) Dani Parejo	Valencia	Transfer	Free	
4 September 2020	(Argentina) Gerónimo Rulli	Real Sociedad	Transfer	€5M	
15 September 2020	(Spain) Mario González	(France) Clermont	Transfer	Free	
16 September 2020	(Ecuador) Pervis Estupiñán	(England) Watford	Transfer	€16.5M	
4 October 2020	(Argentina) Juan Foyth	(England) Tottenham Hotspur	Loan		
30 December 2020	(France) Étienne Capoue	(England) Watford	Transfer	Undisclosed	

=== Out ===
Date	Player	To	Type	Fee	Ref
20 July 2020	(Argentina) Mariano Barbosa	Unattached	End of contract		
20 July 2020	(Spain) Bruno Soriano	Retired			
20 July 2020	(Cameroon) André-Frank Zambo Anguissa	(England) Fulham	Loan return		
4 August 2020	(Qatar) Akram Afif	(Qatar) Al Sadd	Buyout clause	€1M	
4 August 2020	(Spain) Álvaro	(France) Marseille	Buyout clause	€5M	
4 August 2020	(Spain) Santi Cazorla	(Qatar) Al Sadd	Transfer	Free	
4 August 2020	(Cameroon) Karl Toko Ekambi	(France) Lyon	Buyout clause	€11.5M	
4 August 2020	(Romania) Andrei Rațiu	(Netherlands) ADO Den Haag	Loan		
12 August 2020	(Turkey) Enes Ünal	Getafe	Transfer	€9M	
13 August 2020	(Spain) Sergio Lozano	Cartagena	Loan		
14 August 2020	(Spain) Iván Martín	Mirandés	Loan		
18 August 2020	(Spain) Xavi Quintillà	(England) Norwich City	Loan		
25 August 2020	(Spain) Miguelón	Espanyol	Loan		
27 August 2020	(Spain) Enric Franquesa	Girona	Loan		
28 August 2020	(Spain) Andrés Fernández	Huesca	Transfer	Undisclosed	
7 September 2020	(Spain) Manu Morlanes	Almería	Loan		
15 September 2020	(Spain) Mario González	(Portugal) Tondela	Loan		
22 September 2020	(Spain) Jorge Cuenca	Almería	Loan		
24 September 2020	(Spain) Javier Ontiveros	Huesca	Loan	€650K	
8 January 2021	(Japan) Takefusa Kubo	Real Madrid	Loan return		
30 January 2021	(Morocco) Sofian Chakla	Getafe	Loan		

== Pre-season and friendlies ==
Win Draw Loss

23 August 2020 Friendly	Villarreal	3–1	Cartagena	San Pedro del Pinatar, Spain
19:00 CEST (UTC+2)	Niño 1'; Gerard 24'; González 71'	Report	Moreno 18'	Stadium: Pinatar Arena; Attendance: 0 Referee: Abril Portillo

25 August 2020 Friendly	Villarreal	2–3	Tenerife	San Pedro del Pinatar, Spain
20:00 CEST (UTC+2)	Kubo 43'; Alcácer 54'	Report	Apeh 46'; Padilla 51'; Torres 64' (o.g.)	Stadium: Pinatar Arena; Attendance: 0 Referee: Francisco Hernández Maeso

28 August 2020 Friendly	Valencia	2–1	Villarreal	San Pedro del Pinatar, Spain
20:00 CEST (UTC+2)	Gayà (yellow card) 56'; Mangala (yellow card) 60'; Gómez 65', 74', (yellow card) 77'	Report	Chukwueze 8'; Coquelin (yellow card) 34'; Parejo (yellow card) 83'; Costa (yellow card) 85'	Stadium: Pinatar Arena; Attendance: 0 Referee: Francisco Hernández Maeso

2 September 2020 Friendly	Villarreal	2–0	Real Sociedad	Villarreal, Spain
19:00 CEST (UTC+2)	Coquelin 2'; Alcácer 29' (pen.)	Report		Stadium: Ciudad Deportiva; Attendance: 0 Referee: Iván Caparrós Hernández

5 September 2020 Friendly	Villarreal	1–2	Levante	Villarreal, Spain
20:30 CEST (UTC+2)	Alcácer 29'	Report	Sergio León 34'; Morales 62'	Stadium: Ciudad Deportiva; Attendance: 0 Referee: Miguel Bosch Doménech

9 October 2020 Friendly	Villarreal	2–0	Orihuela	Villarreal, Spain
11:30 CEST (UTC+2)	Niño 64'; Bacca 73'			Stadium: Ciudad Deportiva; Attendance: 0

== Competitions ==
=== Overall record ===
Competition	First match	Last match	Starting round	Final position	Record							
Competition	First match	Last match	Starting round	Final position	Pld	W	D	L	GF	GA	GD	Win %
La Liga	13 September 2020	22 May 2021	Matchday 1	7th	38	15	13	10	60	44	+16	39.47
Copa del Rey	16 December 2020	3 February 2021	First round	Quarter-finals	5	4	0	1	12	2	+10	80.00
UEFA Europa League	22 October 2020	26 May 2021	Group stage	Winners	15	12	3	0	31	9	+22	80.00
Total					58	31	16	11	103	55	+48	53.45

Source: Soccerway

=== La Liga ===
==== League table ====
Pos	Team	Pld	W	D	L	GF	GA	GD	Pts	Qualification or relegation
5	Real Sociedad	38	17	11	10	59	38	+21	62	Qualification for the Europa League group stage (Note: Since the winners of the 2020–21 Copa del Rey, Barcelona, qualified for the 2021–22 UEFA Champions League based on league position, the spot awarded to the cup winners (Europa League group stage) was passed to the sixth-placed team, and the spot awarded to the sixth-placed team (2021–22 UEFA Europa Conference League play-off round) was passed to the seventh-placed team, Villarreal.)
6	Real Betis	38	17	10	11	50	50	0	61	Qualification for the Europa League group stage
7	Villarreal	38	15	13	10	60	44	+16	58	Qualification for the Champions League group stage (Note: Villarreal qualified for the 2021–22 UEFA Champions League by winning the 2020–21 UEFA Europa League. Based on their league position (7th), they would have received the spot above to enter the Europa Conference League play-off round. This spot was vacated without replacement as per UEFA regulations.)
8	Celta Vigo	38	14	11	13	55	57	−2	53	
9	Granada	38	13	7	18	47	65	−18	46 (Note: Granada finished ahead of Athletic Bilbao on head-to-head goal difference: Granada 2–0 Athletic Bilbao, Athletic Bilbao 2–1 Granada.)	

Source: La Liga
Rules for classification: 1) Points; 2) Head-to-head points; 3) Head-to-head goal difference; 4) Goal difference; 5) Goals scored; 6) Fair-play points (Note: Head-to-head record is used only after all the matches between the teams in question have been played)

==== Results summary ====
Overall								Home						Away					
Pld	W	D	L	GF	GA	GD	Pts	W	D	L	GF	GA	GD	W	D	L	GF	GA	GD
38	15	13	10	60	44	+16	58	8	6	5	29	23	+6	7	7	5	31	21	+10

Source: La Liga

==== Results by round ====
Round	1	2	3	4	5	6	7	8	9	10	11	12	13	14	15	16	17	18	19	20	21	22	23	24	25	26	27	28	29	30	31	32	33	34	35	36	37	38
Ground	H	H	A	H	A	H	A	H	A	H	A	H	A	A	H	A	H	A	H	A	H	A	H	A	H	A	A	H	A	H	A	H	A	H	H	A	H	A
Result	D	W	L	W	D	W	D	W	W	D	D	D	D	W	D	L	W	W	D	D	D	D	L	D	L	L	W	W	W	L	L	L	W	W	L	W	W	L
Position	6	3	8	4	4	2	4	3	2	3	3	3	4	4	4	5	4	4	5	5	5	5	6	6	7	7	7	7	7	7	7	7	7	6	7	7	7	7

Source: La Liga
A = Away; H = Home; W = Win; D = Draw; L = Loss

==== Matches ====
The league fixtures were announced on 31 August 2020.

13 September 2020 1	Villarreal	1–1	Huesca	Villarreal
18:30 CEST (UTC+2)	Pedraza (yellow card) 36'; Gerard 68' (pen.)	Report	Maffeo 42'; Mosquera (yellow card) 88'	Stadium: Estadio de la Cerámica; Attendance: 0 (Note: The match was played behind closed doors due to the COVID-19 pandemic in Spain.); Referee: Xavier Estrada Fernández

19 September 2020 2	Villarreal	2–1	Eibar	Villarreal
16:00 CEST (UTC+2)	Coquelin (yellow card) 39'; Gerard 63'; Alcácer 71'	Report	Recio (yellow card) 24'; Kike 50'	Stadium: Estadio de la Cerámica; Attendance: 0 Referee: Jorge Figueroa Vázquez

27 September 2020 3	Barcelona	4–0	Villarreal	Barcelona
21:00 CEST (UTC+2)	Fati 15', 19'; Messi 35' (pen.); Torres 45' (o.g.)	Report	Gerard (yellow card) 83'	Stadium: Camp Nou; Attendance: 0 Referee: Guillermo Cuadra Fernández

30 September 2020 4	Villarreal	3–1	Alavés	Villarreal
19:00 CEST (UTC+2)	Alcácer 13', 67'; Gerard 45' (pen.)	Report	Méndez 36'; Laguardia (yellow card) 74'; Navarro (yellow card) 82'	Stadium: Estadio de la Cerámica; Attendance: 0 Referee: David Medié Jiménez

3 October 2020 5	Atlético Madrid	0–0	Villarreal	Madrid
16:00 CEST (UTC+2)	Lodi (yellow card) 56'	Report	Albiol (yellow card) 50'; Iborra (yellow card) 79'	Stadium: Wanda Metropolitano; Attendance: 0 Referee: Alejandro Hernández Hernández

18 October 2020 6	Villarreal	2–1	Valencia	Villarreal
16:00 CEST (UTC+2)	Alcácer 6' (pen.); Iborra (yellow card) 12'; Pedraza (yellow card) 52'; Parejo 69'; Kubo (yellow card) 72' (yellow-red card) 90+2'	Report	Guedes 37'; Gabriel (yellow card) 84'	Stadium: Estadio de la Cerámica; Attendance: 0 Referee: Carlos del Cerro Grande

25 October 2020 7	Cádiz	0–0	Villarreal	Cádiz
16:00 CET (UTC+1)	Salvi (yellow card) 33'; Jairo (yellow card) 90+2'	Report	Mario (yellow card) 6'; Pedraza (yellow card) 90+1'	Stadium: Ramón de Carranza; Attendance: 0 Referee: Ricardo de Burgos Bengoetxea

2 November 2020 8	Villarreal	2–0	Valladolid	Villarreal
21:00 CET (UTC+1)	Chukwueze 21'; Torres 37'; Mario (yellow card) 90+1'	Report	Joaquín (yellow card) 34'; Alcaraz (yellow card) 52'; García (yellow card) 71'	Stadium: Estadio de la Cerámica; Attendance: 0 Referee: Javier Alberola Rojas

8 November 2020 9	Getafe	1–3	Villarreal	Getafe
14:00 CET (UTC+1)	Arambarri 16'; Timor (yellow card) 42'; Ángel (yellow card) 52'; Maksimović (yellow card) 90+1'	Report	Alcácer 11'; Trigueros 17', (yellow card) 65'; Gómez (yellow card) 21'; Iborra (yellow card) 27'; Gerard 62'; Pedraza (yellow card) 90+3'	Stadium: Coliseum Alfonso Pérez; Attendance: 0 Referee: José Luis Munuera Montero

21 November 2020 10	Villarreal	1–1	Real Madrid	Villarreal
16:15 CET (UTC+1)	Gerard 76' (pen.); Pino (yellow card) 90+1'	Report	Mariano 2'; Nacho (yellow card) 68'; Kroos (yellow card) 90+3'	Stadium: Estadio de la Cerámica; Attendance: 0 Referee: Alejandro Hernández Hernández

29 November 2020 11	Real Sociedad	1–1	Villarreal	San Sebastián
21:00 CET (UTC+1)	Elustondo (yellow card) 5'; Oyarzabal 33' (pen.); Le Normand (yellow card) 37'; Barrenetxea (yellow card) 53'; Muñoz (yellow card) 75'; Zubimendi (yellow card) 86'	Report	Gerard 6' (pen.); Torres (yellow card) 31'; Albiol (yellow card) 32'; Iborra (yellow card) 73'	Stadium: Anoeta; Attendance: 0 Referee: Jesús Gil Manzano

6 December 2020 12	Villarreal	0–0	Elche	Villarreal
18:30 CET (UTC+1)	Parejo (yellow card) 64'; Albiol (yellow card) 75'; Coquelin (yellow card) 81'	Report	Milla (yellow card) 23'; Fidel (yellow card) 67'	Stadium: Estadio de la Cerámica; Attendance: 0 Referee: Santiago Jaime Latre

13 December 2020 13	Real Betis	1–1	Villarreal	Seville
16:15 CET (UTC+1)	Iglesias (yellow card) 12'; Ruibal 51'; Rodríguez (yellow card) 64'	Report	Torres 5'; Niño (yellow card) 15'; Trigueros (yellow card) 17'; Pedraza (yellow card) 49'	Stadium: Benito Villamarín; Attendance: 0 Referee: Valentín Pizarro Gómez

19 December 2020 14	Osasuna	1–3	Villarreal	Pamplona
18:30 CET (UTC+1)	Aridane (red card) 19'; Oier (yellow card) 40'; Torres 70' (pen.); U. García (yellow card) 79'	Report	Gerard 7', 86', (yellow card) 83'; Niño 29'; Pino (yellow card) 69'	Stadium: El Sadar Stadium; Attendance: 0 Referee: Jorge Figueroa Vázquez

22 December 2020 15	Villarreal	1–1	Athletic Bilbao	Villarreal
22:00 CET (UTC+1)	Gerard (yellow card) 36'; Pino 75'	Report	Williams 19'; Berenguer (yellow card) 71'	Stadium: Estadio de la Cerámica; Attendance: 0 Referee: David Medié Jiménez

29 December 2020 16	Sevilla	2–0	Villarreal	Seville
17:00 CET (UTC+1)	Ocampos 8' (pen.); Fernando (yellow card) 39'; En-Nesyri 53'	Report	Foyth (yellow card) 7'; Trigueros (yellow card) 76'; Parejo (yellow card) 88'; Bacca (yellow card) 90+1'	Stadium: Ramón Sánchez Pizjuán; Attendance: 0 Referee: César Soto Grado

2 January 2021 17	Villarreal	2–1	Levante	Villarreal
14:00 CET (UTC+1)	Niño 19'; Pino (yellow card) 45'; Gerard 54'	Report	León 73'; Malsa (yellow card) 84'	Stadium: Estadio de la Cerámica; Attendance: 0 Referee: Pablo González Fuertes

8 January 2021 18	Celta Vigo	0–4	Villarreal	Vigo
21:00 CET (UTC+1)	Méndez (yellow card) 58'	Report	Gerard 5'; Gómez 14'; Parejo 19'; Niño 31'	Stadium: Balaídos; Attendance: 0 Referee: Xavier Estrada Fernández

20 January 2021 19	Villarreal	2–2	Granada	Villarreal
21:30 CET (UTC+1)	Peña 29'; Gómez 65' (pen.); Foyth (yellow card) 80'; Alcácer (penalty missed) 90+2'; Coquelin (yellow card) 90+5'	Report	Milla (yellow card) 15'; Soldado 21'; Herrera (yellow card) 35'; Kenedy 75'; Machís (yellow card) 90'; Eteki (red card) 90+1'; Duarte (yellow card) 90+5'	Stadium: Estadio de la Cerámica; Attendance: 0 Referee: Valentín Pizarro Gómez

23 January 2021 20	Huesca	0–0	Villarreal	Huesca
14:00 CET (UTC+1)	Ontiveros (yellow card) 34'; Escriche (yellow card) 55'; Luisinho (yellow card) 89'	Report	Capoue (yellow card) 73'	Stadium: El Alcoraz; Attendance: 0 Referee: Javier Alberola Rojas

30 January 2021 21	Villarreal	1–1	Real Sociedad	Villarreal
21:00 CET (UTC+1)	Parejo 3'; Capoue (yellow card) 70'	Report	Illarramendi (yellow card) 32'; Le Normand (yellow card) 49'; Guevara (yellow card) 59'; Isak 90+3'	Stadium: Estadio de la Cerámica; Attendance: 0 Referee: Isidro Díaz De Mera Escuderos

6 February 2021 22	Elche	2–2	Villarreal	Elche
18:30 CET (UTC+1)	Boyé (yellow card) 22', (goal) 64'; Carrillo 49'	Report	Gerard 16', 35'; Pedraza (yellow card) 62'; Trigueros (yellow card) 70'	Stadium: Martínez Valero; Attendance: 0 Referee: Mario Melero López

14 February 2021 23	Villarreal	1–2	Real Betis	Villarreal
21:00 CET (UTC+1)	Parejo (yellow card) 43'; Foyth (yellow card) 55'; Gerard 65' (pen.); Peña (yellow card) 85'	Report	Fekir 45'; Emerson 52', (yellow card) 55'; Miranda (yellow card) 90+5'	Stadium: Estadio de la Cerámica; Attendance: 0 Referee: Jesús Gil Manzano

21 February 2021 24	Athletic Bilbao	1–1	Villarreal	Bilbao
21:00 CET (UTC+1)	Berenguer 44'; D. García (yellow card) 53'; López (yellow card) 86'	Report	Gerard 16'; Capoue (yellow card) 40'; Foyth (yellow card) 55'	Stadium: San Mamés; Attendance: 0 Referee: Carlos del Cerro Grande

28 February 2021 25	Villarreal	0–2	Atlético Madrid	Villarreal
21:00 CET (UTC+1)	Costa (yellow card) 32'; Albiol (yellow card) 51'	Report	Pedraza 25' (o.g.); Felipe (yellow card) 35'; Lemar (yellow card) 45+5'; Saúl (yellow card) 47'; Félix 69'	Stadium: Estadio de la Cerámica; Attendance: 0 Referee: Ricardo de Burgos Bengoetxea

5 March 2021 26	Valencia	2–1	Villarreal	Valencia
21:00 CET (UTC+1)	Račić (yellow card) 14'; Soler (yellow card) 23', (goal) 86' (pen.); Gayà (yellow card) 39'; Gómez (yellow card) 67'; Guedes 90+1'	Report	Foyth (yellow card) 36'; Gerard 40' (pen.); Capoue (yellow card) 42'; Albiol (yellow card) 85'	Stadium: Mestalla; Attendance: 0 Referee: Xavier Estrada Fernández

14 March 2021 27	Eibar	1–3	Villarreal	Eibar
18:30 CET (UTC+1)	Burgos (penalty missed) 42'; Arbilla (yellow card) 51'; Enrich 55'; Gil (yellow card) 56'	Report	Gómez 1'; Bacca 34'; Pedraza (yellow card) 70', (goal) 87'; Capoue (red card) 80'; Asenjo (yellow card) 86'	Stadium: Ipurua; Attendance: 0 Referee: David Medié Jiménez

21 March 2021 28	Villarreal	2–1	Cádiz	Villarreal
16:15 CET (UTC+1)	Gerard 5' (pen.); Foyth (yellow card) 35'; Trigueros (yellow card) 60'; Bacca 67'; Albiol (yellow card) 90+4'	Report	Jønsson (yellow card) 4'; Cala (yellow card) 15'; Álex 69'; Fali (yellow card) 90+4'	Stadium: Estadio de la Cerámica; Attendance: 0 Referee: César Soto Grado

3 April 2021 29	Granada	0–3	Villarreal	Granada
14:00 CEST (UTC+2)	Soldado (yellow card) 36'; Quini (yellow card) 45+1'; Molina (penalty missed) 80'	Report	Gerard 9' (pen.), 18', 60' (pen.); Parejo (yellow card) 22'; Gaspar (yellow card) 43'	Stadium: Nuevo Los Cármenes; Attendance: 0 Referee: Guillermo Cuadra Fernández

11 April 2021 30	Villarreal	1–2	Osasuna	Villarreal
14:00 CEST (UTC+2)	D. García 70' (o.g.)	Report	Moncayola 64'; Budimir 74'	Stadium: Estadio de la Cerámica; Attendance: 0 Referee: José Luis Munuera Montero

18 April 2021 33	Levante	1–5	Villarreal	Valencia
21:00 CEST (UTC+2)	Malsa 21'; Roger (yellow card) 68'; Clerc (yellow card) 85'	Report	Postigo 9' (o.g.); Gerard 13'; Chukwueze 63', 75'; Coquelin (yellow card) 64'; Vezo 72' (o.g.)	Stadium: Ciutat de València; Attendance: 0 Referee: Ricardo de Burgos Bengoetxea
Note: The match was originally scheduled for 28 April 2021, but was brought forward by La Liga.

21 April 2021 31	Alavés	2–1	Villarreal	Vitoria-Gasteiz
21:00 CEST (UTC+2)	Joselu 17'; García (yellow card) 69'; Méndez (yellow card) 74', (goal) 80'	Report	Alcácer 50'; Pedraza (yellow card) 63'	Stadium: Mendizorrotza; Attendance: 0 Referee: Adrián Cordero Vega

25 April 2021 32	Villarreal	1–2	Barcelona	Villarreal
16:15 CEST (UTC+2)	Chukwueze 26'; Trigueros (red card) 65'; Albiol (yellow card) 66'; Torres (yellow card) 74'	Report	Griezmann 28', 35', (yellow card) 50'; Busquets (yellow card) 82'; Mingueza (yellow card) 90+3'	Stadium: Estadio de la Cerámica; Attendance: 0 Referee: Carlos del Cerro Grande

2 May 2021 34	Villarreal	1–0	Getafe	Villarreal
16:15 CEST (UTC+2)	Funes Mori (yellow card) 67'; Pino 79'	Report	Cucurella (yellow card) 63'; Maksimović (yellow card) 81'	Stadium: Estadio de la Cerámica; Attendance: 0 Referee: Xavier Estrada Fernández

9 May 2021 35	Villarreal	2–4	Celta Vigo	Villarreal
18:30 CEST (UTC+2)	Estupiñán (yellow card) 5'; Gómez 25'; Asenjo (yellow card) 33'; Rulli (red card) 45+4'; Gaspar (red card) 45+7'; Gerard 87' (pen.); Pino (yellow card) 89'	Report	Mina 19', 34' (pen.); Araujo (yellow card) 44'; Méndez 45+3' (pen.); Solari 57'; Ferreyra (yellow card) 79' (yellow-red card) 88'	Stadium: Estadio de la Cerámica; Attendance: 0 Referee: David Medié Jiménez

13 May 2021 36	Valladolid	0–2	Villarreal	Valladolid
19:00 CEST (UTC+2)	El Yamiq (yellow card) 30'; Kiko (yellow card) 76'; Guardiola (yellow card) 88'	Report	Gerard 68'; Capoue (yellow card) 88', (goal) 90+1'	Stadium: José Zorrilla; Attendance: 0 Referee: Ricardo de Burgos Bengoetxea

16 May 2021 37	Villarreal	4–0	Sevilla	Villarreal
18:30 CEST (UTC+2)	Bacca 34', 47', 79'; Gerard 66'	Report	Diego Carlos (yellow card) 29' (yellow-red card) 52'; Acuña (yellow card) 51'	Stadium: Estadio de la Cerámica; Attendance: 0 Referee: Guillermo Cuadra Fernández

22 May 2021 38	Real Madrid	2–1	Villarreal	Madrid
18:00 CEST (UTC+2)	Benzema 87'; Modrić 90+2'	Report	Pino 68'	Stadium: Alfredo Di Stéfano; Attendance: 0 Referee: José Luis Munuera Montero

=== Copa del Rey ===
16 December 2020 First round	Leioa	0–6	Villarreal	Leioa
21:00 CET (UTC+1)	Pradera (yellow card) 26'	Report	Pino 6', (yellow card) 38'; Niño 20' (pen.); Baena (yellow card) 54'; Costa 60'; Chakla 66'; Millán 81'; Pedraza 90+2'	Stadium: Sarriena; Referee: Xavier Estrada Fernández

5 January 2021 Second round	Zamora	1–4	Villarreal	Zamora
19:00 CET (UTC+1)	Ramos 45+2'	Report	Bacca 31'; Pino 43'; Niño 73'; Raba 88'	Stadium: Ruta de la Plata; Referee: Valentín Pizarro Gómez

17 January 2021 Round of 32	Tenerife	0–1	Villarreal	Santa Cruz de Tenerife
17:00 CET (UTC+1)	Vada (yellow card) 31'; Zarfino (yellow card) 86'	Report	Niño 90'	Stadium: Heliodoro Rodríguez López; Referee: César Soto Grado

26 January 2021 Round of 16	Girona	0–1	Villarreal	Girona
21:00 CET (UTC+1)	Bustos (yellow card) 39'; Franquesa (yellow card) 90+2'	Report	Trigueros (yellow card) 17'; Pino 19'; Coquelin (yellow card) 51'; Baena (yellow card) 73'; Raba (yellow card) 90+1'	Stadium: Montilivi; Referee: Ricardo de Burgos Bengoetxea

3 February 2021 Quarter-finals	Levante	1–0 (a.e.t.)	Villarreal	Valencia
19:00 CET (UTC+1)	Bardhi (yellow card) 25'; Rochina (yellow card) 42'; Postigo (yellow card) 88'; Melero (yellow card) 111'; Roger 120+1'	Report	Albiol (yellow card) 37'; Trigueros (yellow card) 57'; Parejo (yellow card) 103'; Baena (yellow card) 113'	Stadium: Ciutat de València; Referee: César Soto Grado

=== UEFA Europa League ===
==== Group stage ====
The group stage draw was held on 2 October 2020.

Pos	Team	Pld	W	D	L	GF	GA	GD	Pts	Qualification	VIL	MTA	SIV	QRB
1	(Spain) Villarreal	6	5	1	0	17	5	+12	16	Advance to knockout phase	—	4–0	5–3	3–0 (Note: The Villarreal v Qarabağ match was awarded as a 3–0 win to Villarreal after being cancelled as several players of the Qarabağ squad tested positive for the SARS-CoV-2.)
2	(Israel) Maccabi Tel Aviv	6	3	2	1	6	7	−1	11	Advance to knockout phase	1–1	—	1–0	1–0
3	(Turkey) Sivasspor	6	2	0	4	9	11	−2	6		0–1	1–2	—	2–0
4	(Azerbaijan) Qarabağ	6	0	1	5	4	13	−9	1		1–3	1–1	2–3	—

Source: UEFA
Rules for classification: Group stage tiebreakers
Notes:

22 October 2020 1	Villarreal (Spain)	5–3	(Turkey) Sivasspor	Villarreal, Spain
21:00 CEST (UTC+2)	Kubo 13'; Bacca 20'; Foyth 57', (yellow card) 63'; Coquelin (yellow card) 61'; Alcácer 74', 78'; Pedraza (yellow card) 87'	Report	Kayode 33'; Yalçın (yellow card) 34'; Yatabaré 43'; Gradel 64', (yellow card) 75'; Cofie (yellow card) 69'	Stadium: Estadio de la Cerámica; Attendance: 0 (Note: Due to the COVID-19 pandemic in Europe, the match was played behind closed doors.); Referee: Paweł Raczkowski (Poland)

29 October 2020 2	Qarabağ (Azerbaijan)	1–3	(Spain) Villarreal	Istanbul, Turkey
18:55 CET (UTC+1)	Romero (yellow card) 2'; Ozobić (yellow card) 13'; Andrade (yellow card) 39'; Owusu 78'; A. Huseynov (yellow card) 90+4'	Report	Iborra (yellow card) 25'; Pino 80'; Alcácer 84', 90+5' (pen.)	Stadium: Başakşehir Fatih Terim Stadium (Note: Qarabağ played their home matches at the neutral venue Başakşehir Fatih Terim Stadium, Istanbul (Turkey), instead of their regular home stadium Tofiq Bahramov Republican Stadium, Baku, as UEFA announced on 20 October 2020 to temporarily suspend all UEFA matches taking place in Armenia and Azerbaijan until further notice due to the 2020 Nagorno-Karabakh conflict.); Attendance: 0 Referee: Pavel Orel (Czech Republic)

5 November 2020 3	Villarreal (Spain)	4–0	(Israel) Maccabi Tel Aviv	Villarreal, Spain
22:10 CET (UTC+1) (Note: The Villarreal v Maccabi Tel Aviv match was originally scheduled at 21:00, but was delayed due to heavy rain.)	Bacca 4', 52'; Baena 71'; Funes Mori (yellow card) 77'; Niño 81'	Report	Glazer (yellow card) 56'; Saborit (yellow card) 59'	Stadium: Estadio de la Cerámica; Attendance: 0 Referee: Nikola Dabanović (Montenegro)

26 November 2020 4	Maccabi Tel Aviv (Israel)	1–1	(Spain) Villarreal	Tel Aviv, Israel
18:55 CET (UTC+1)	Kandil (yellow card) 43'; Pešić 47'; Daniel (yellow card) 79'; Saborit (red card) 89'	Report	Coquelin (yellow card) 26'; Baena 45'; Funes Mori (yellow card) 73'; Peña (yellow card) 89'	Stadium: Bloomfield Stadium; Attendance: 0 Referee: Tiago Martins (Portugal)

3 December 2020 5	Sivasspor (Turkey)	0–1	(Spain) Villarreal	Sivas, Turkey
18:55 CET (UTC+1)	Fajr (yellow card) 60'; Appindangoyé (yellow card) 79'	Report	Peña (yellow card) 61'; Chukwueze 75'	Stadium: New Sivas 4 Eylül Stadium; Attendance: 0 Referee: Duje Strukan (Croatia)

10 December 2020 6	Villarreal (Spain)	3–0; Awarded (Note: The Villarreal v Qarabağ match was cancelled and awarded as a 3–0 win to Villarreal after several players of the Qarabağ squad were tested positive for the SARS-CoV-2.)	(Azerbaijan) Qarabağ	Villarreal, Spain
21:00 CET (UTC+1)		Report		Stadium: Estadio de la Cerámica; Referee: Mykola Balakin (Ukraine)

==== Knockout phase ====
===== Round of 32 =====
The draw for the round of 32 was held on 14 December 2020.

18 February 2021 First leg	Red Bull Salzburg (Austria)	0–2	(Spain) Villarreal	Wals-Siezenheim, Austria
21:00 CET (UTC+1)	Kristensen (yellow card) 29'; Solet (yellow card) 40'; Okafor (yellow card) 89'; Ulmer (yellow card) 90+5'	Report	Alcácer (penalty missed) 29', 41'; Niño 71'; Albiol (yellow card) 90'	Stadium: Stadion Wals-Siezenheim; Attendance: 0 Referee: Andris Treimanis (Latvia)

25 February 2021 Second leg	Villarreal (Spain)	2–1 (4–1 agg.)	(Austria) Red Bull Salzburg	Villarreal, Spain
18:55 CET (UTC+1)	Gerard 40', 89' (pen.); Costa (yellow card) 69'	Report	Berisha 17'; Vallci (yellow card) 20'; Mwepu (yellow card) 53'; Daka (yellow card) 55'; Adeyemi (yellow card) 80'	Stadium: Estadio de la Cerámica; Attendance: 0 Referee: Felix Zwayer (Germany)

===== Round of 16 =====
The draw for the round of 16 was held on 26 February 2021.

11 March 2021 First leg	Dynamo Kyiv (Ukraine)	0–2	(Spain) Villarreal	Kyiv, Ukraine
19:55 EET (UTC+2)	Sydorchuk (yellow card) 9'	Report	Pedraza (yellow card) 24'; Torres 30'; Albiol 52'; Capoue (yellow card) 65'	Stadium: NSC Olimpiyskiy Stadium; Attendance: 12,751; Referee: Michael Oliver (England)

18 March 2021 Second leg	Villarreal (Spain)	2–0 (4–0 agg.)	(Ukraine) Dynamo Kyiv	Villarreal, Spain
21:00 CET (UTC+1)	Gerard 13', 36'; Trigueros (yellow card) 17'; Parejo (yellow card) 43'	Report		Stadium: Estadio de la Cerámica; Attendance: 0 Referee: Andreas Ekberg (Sweden)

===== Quarter-finals =====
The draw for the quarter-finals was held on 19 March 2021.

8 April 2021 First leg	Dinamo Zagreb (Croatia)	0–1	(Spain) Villarreal	Zagreb, Croatia
21:00 CEST (UTC+2)		Report	Gerard 44' (pen.), (yellow card) 76'	Stadium: Stadion Maksimir; Attendance: 0 Referee: Daniel Siebert (Germany)

15 April 2021 Second leg	Villarreal (Spain)	2–1 (3–1 agg.)	(Croatia) Dinamo Zagreb	Villarreal, Spain
21:00 CEST (UTC+2)	Alcácer 36'; Gerard 43'; Trigueros (yellow card) 60'	Report	Jakić (yellow card) 40'; Oršić 74'	Stadium: Estadio de la Cerámica; Attendance: 0 Referee: Danny Makkelie (Netherlands)

===== Semi-finals =====
The draw for the semi-finals was held on 19 March 2021, after the quarter-final draw.

29 April 2021 First leg	Villarreal (Spain)	2–1	(England) Arsenal	Villarreal, Spain
21:00 CEST (UTC+2)	Trigueros 5'; Albiol 29'; Torres (yellow card) 37'; Capoue (yellow card) 68' (yellow-red card) 80'	Report	Ceballos (yellow card) 44' (yellow-red card) 57'; Partey (yellow card) 58'; Pépé 73' (pen.); Aubameyang (yellow card) 90'	Stadium: Estadio de la Cerámica; Attendance: 0 Referee: Artur Soares Dias (Portugal)

6 May 2021 Second leg	Arsenal (England)	0–0 (1–2 agg.)	(Spain) Villarreal	London, England
20:00 BST (UTC+1)	Nketiah (yellow card) 90+2'	Report	Pino (yellow card) 86'	Stadium: Emirates Stadium; Attendance: 0 Referee: Slavko Vinčić (Slovenia)

===== Final =====
26 May 2021 Final	Villarreal (Spain)	1–1 (a.e.t.) (11–10 p)	(England) Manchester United	Gdańsk, Poland
21:00 CEST (UTC+2)	Gerard 29'; Capoue (yellow card) 54'; Foyth (yellow card) 85'	Report	Cavani 55', (yellow card) 113'; Bailly (yellow card) 82'	Stadium: Stadion Miejski; Attendance: 9,412; Referee: Clément Turpin (France)
	Penalties
	Gerard (penalty scored); Raba (penalty scored); Alcácer (penalty scored); Moreno (penalty scored); Parejo (penalty scored); Gómez (penalty scored); Albiol (penalty scored); Coquelin (penalty scored); Mario Gaspar (penalty scored); Torres (penalty scored); Rulli (penalty scored)		(penalty scored) Mata; (penalty scored) Telles; (penalty scored) Fernandes; (penalty scored) Rashford; (penalty scored) Cavani; (penalty scored) Fred; (penalty scored) James; (penalty scored) Shaw; (penalty scored) Tuanzebe; (penalty scored) Lindelöf; (penalty missed) De Gea

== Statistics ==
=== Squad statistics ===
Last updated 26 May 2021.

No.	Pos	Nat	Player	Total		La Liga		Copa del Rey		UEFA Europa League	
No.	Pos	Nat	Player	Apps	Goals	Apps	Goals	Apps	Goals	Apps	Goals
Goalkeepers
1	GK	(Spain) ESP	Sergio Asenjo	37	0	36	0	0	0	1	0
13	GK	(Argentina) ARG	Gerónimo Rulli	20	1	2	0	5	0	13	1
Defenders
2	DF	(Spain) ESP	Mario Gaspar	29	0	21+3	0	1	0	1+3	0
3	DF	(Spain) ESP	Raúl Albiol	47	2	35	0	1	0	11	2
4	DF	(Spain) ESP	Pau Torres	44	3	33	2	2	0	9	1
6	DF	(Argentina) ARG	Ramiro Funes Mori	20	0	8+2	0	4	0	4+2	0
8	DF	(Argentina) ARG	Juan Foyth	32	1	13+3	0	4	0	10+2	1
15	DF	(Ecuador) ECU	Pervis Estupiñán	33	0	12+13	0	3+1	0	2+2	0
18	DF	(Spain) ESP	Alberto Moreno	9	0	2+3	0	0	0	0+4	0
20	DF	(Spain) ESP	Rubén Peña	29	1	12+6	1	2+1	0	6+2	0
21	DF	(Spain) ESP	Jaume Costa	25	1	3+11	0	3	1	5+3	0
24	DF	(Spain) ESP	Alfonso Pedraza	44	2	24+5	1	2+1	1	10+2	0
Midfielders
5	MF	(Spain) ESP	Dani Parejo	53	3	36	3	1+4	0	10+2	0
10	MF	(Spain) ESP	Vicente Iborra	18	0	10+3	0	0	0	3+2	0
11	MF	(Nigeria) NGR	Samuel Chukwueze	40	5	13+15	4	1	0	10+1	1
14	MF	(Spain) ESP	Manu Trigueros	54	2	30+5	1	3+2	0	12+2	1
19	MF	(France) FRA	Francis Coquelin	32	0	7+15	0	3	0	4+3	0
23	MF	(Spain) ESP	Moi Gómez	49	4	29+6	4	1+2	0	1+10	0
25	MF	(France) FRA	Étienne Capoue	27	1	15+1	1	2+1	0	8	0
28	MF	(Spain) ESP	Carlo Adriano	1	0	0	0	0+1	0	0	0
30	MF	(Spain) ESP	Yéremy Pino	37	7	6+18	3	4	3	2+7	1
32	MF	(Spain) ESP	Álex Baena	20	2	2+4	0	4+1	0	4+5	2
Forwards
7	FW	(Spain) ESP	Gerard Moreno	46	30	30+3	23	0+1	0	9+3	7
9	FW	(Colombia) COL	Carlos Bacca	35	9	9+14	5	2+1	1	7+2	3
12	FW	(Spain) ESP	Dani Raba	11	1	1+4	0	2+2	1	0+2	0
17	FW	(Spain) ESP	Paco Alcácer	39	12	19+8	6	1+1	0	6+4	6
34	FW	(Spain) ESP	Fernando Niño	27	8	8+9	3	2+3	3	1+4	2
40	FW	(Spain) ESP	Álex Millán	2	1	0+1	0	0+1	1	0	0
Players who have made an appearance or had a squad number this season but have left the club
22	DF	(Morocco) MAR	Sofian Chakla	3	1	0+1	0	2	1	0	0
16	MF	(Japan) JPN	Takefusa Kubo	19	1	2+11	0	0+1	0	5	1

=== Goalscorers ===
As of 26 May 2021

Rank	No.	Pos.	Nat.	Name	La Liga	Copa del Rey	Europa League	Total
1	7	FW	(Spain)	Gerard	23	0	7	30
2	17	FW	(Spain)	Paco Alcácer	6	0	6	12
3	9	FW	(Colombia)	Carlos Bacca	5	1	3	9
4	34	FW	(Spain)	Fer Niño	3	3	2	8
5	30	MF	(Spain)	Yéremy Pino	3	3	1	7
6	11	MF	(Nigeria)	Samuel Chukwueze	4	0	1	5
7	23	MF	(Spain)	Moi Gómez	4	0	0	4
8	4	DF	(Spain)	Pau Torres	2	0	1	3
8	5	MF	(Spain)	Dani Parejo	3	0	0	3
10	3	DF	(Spain)	Raúl Albiol	0	0	2	2
10	14	MF	(Spain)	Manu Trigueros	1	0	1	2
10	24	DF	(Spain)	Alfonso Pedraza	1	1	0	2
10	32	MF	(Spain)	Álex Baena	0	0	2	2
14	8	DF	(Argentina)	Juan Foyth	0	0	1	1
14	12	FW	(Spain)	Dani Raba	0	1	0	1
14	16	MF	(Japan)	Takefusa Kubo	0	0	1	1
14	20	DF	(Spain)	Rubén Peña	1	0	0	1
14	21	DF	(Spain)	Jaume Costa	0	1	0	1
14	22	DF	(Morocco)	Sofian Chakla	0	1	0	1
14	25	MF	(France)	Étienne Capoue	1	0	0	1
14	40	FW	(Spain)	Álex Millán	0	1	0	1
Own goals					3	0	0	3
Totals					60	12	28	100
