= Yeremy Pino =

Spanish football player (Born in 2002)

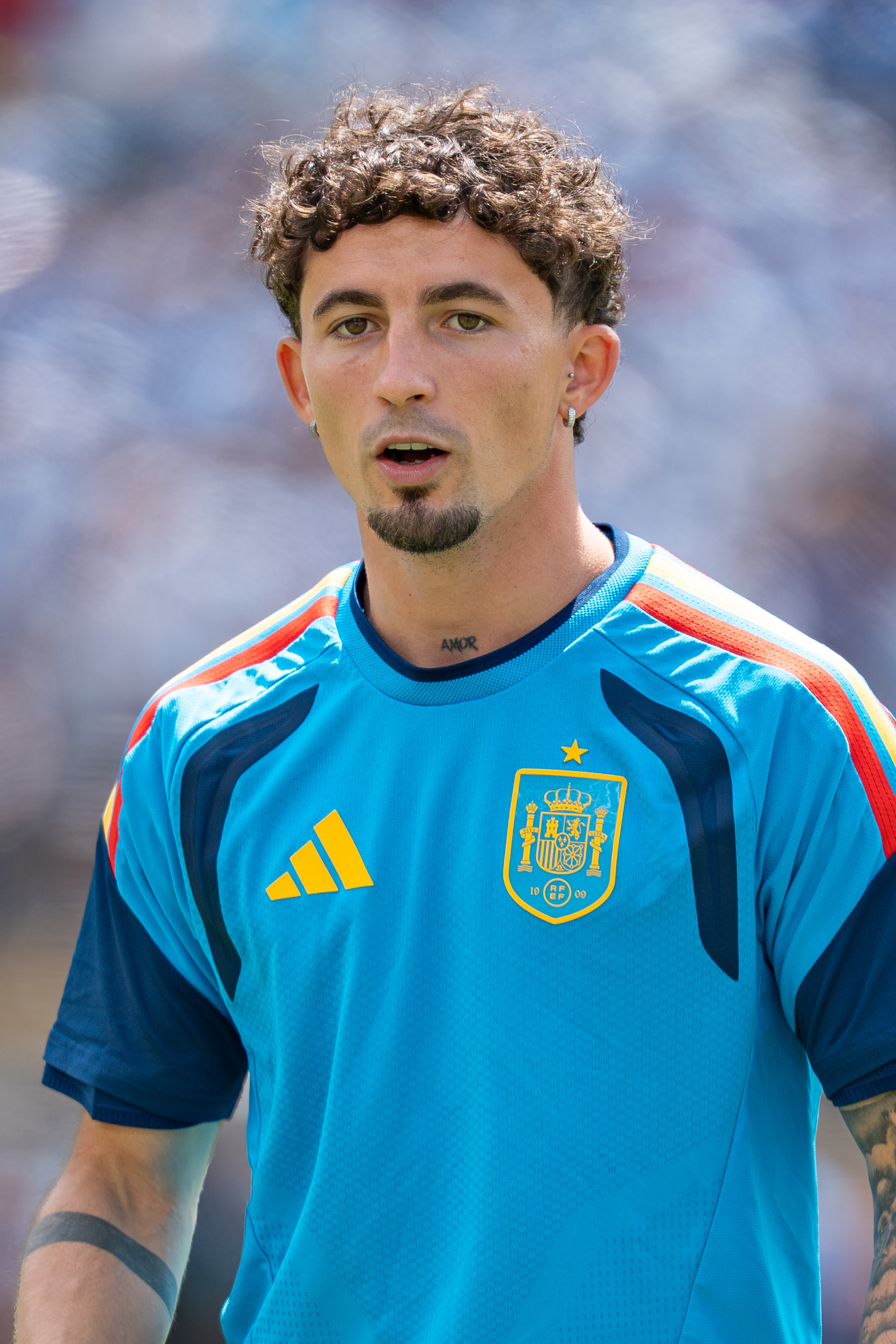
- Pino with Spain in 2026

Personal information
- Full name: Yeremy Jesús Pino Santos
- Date of birth: 20 October 2002 (age 24)
- Place of birth: Las Palmas, Spain
- Height: 1.72 m (5 ft 8 in)
- Positions: Winger; forward

Team information
- Current team: Crystal Palace
- Number: 10

Youth career
- Barrio Atlántico
- 2011–2014: Huracán
- 2014–2017: Las Palmas
- 2017–2019: Villarreal

Senior career*
Years	Team	Apps	(Gls)
2019–2020	Villarreal C	20	(3)
2020–2025	Villarreal	134	(17)
2025–	Crystal Palace	45	(4)

International career^{‡}
2018	Spain U16	5	(1)
2018–2019	Spain U17	18	(2)
2019–2020	Spain U18	9	(2)
2021	Spain U21	6	(3)
2021–	Spain	28	(4)
Medal record
Men's football
Representing Spain
FIFA World Cup
Winner	2026 Canada–Mexico–US
UEFA Nations League
Winner	2023 Netherlands
Runner-up	2021 Italy
Runner-up	2025 Germany
- * Club domestic league appearances and goals as of 21 November 2026 ‡ National team caps and goals as of 12 November 2026

Yeremy Jesús Pino Santos (born 20 October 2002) is a Spanish professional footballer who plays as a winger or forward for Premier League club Crystal Palace and the Spain national team.

Pino is an academy graduate of Villarreal, and made his first-team debut in 2020. He started as Villarreal won the 2021 UEFA Europa League final in his first season, becoming the youngest player to win the competition. Pino later left Villarreal and signed with English club Crystal Palace in August 2025, winning the UEFA Conference League in his first season.

Pino represented Spain at various youth levels before making his senior international debut in 2021, being included in the squads for the FIFA World Cup in 2022 and 2026, winning the latter tournament. He was also part of the squad that won the 2022–23 UEFA Nations League, starting in the final.

== Club career ==
=== Villarreal ===
==== Early career ====
Pino was born in Las Palmas, Canary Islands, and joined Las Palmas' youth setup in 2014, after representing Huracán and Barrio Atlántico. On 22 June 2017, after turning down an offer from Barcelona, he signed for Villarreal.

Pino made his senior debut with the C-team on 24 August 2019, coming on as a second-half substitute for Fer Niño and scoring the third of a 3–0 Tercera División away win against Recambios Colón. After finishing his first senior season with three goals in 20 appearances, he was promoted to the reserves in Segunda División B.

==== 2020–21 season ====
After spending the pre-season with the first team under Unai Emery, Pino made his professional debut on 22 October 2020, replacing Francis Coquelin in a 5–3 UEFA Europa League victory against Sivasspor. He made his La Liga debut three days later, again from the bench in a 0–0 draw at Cádiz.

Pino scored his first professional goal on 29 October 2020, netting the equalizer in a 3–1 away success over Qarabağ also in the European competition. On 12 November, he renewed his contract with the club until 2024. On 26 May 2021, Pino played in the 2021 UEFA Europa League Final – becoming the youngest Spanish player to start a major European final, aged 18 years and 218 days – breaking the previous record of Iker Casillas in the 2000 UEFA Champions League Final, aged 19 years and 4 days. He also became the youngest player to win the competition, eclipsing the record set by Robin van Persie in the 2002 UEFA Cup Final.

==== 2021–22 season and beyond ====
Pino scored four times on 27 February 2022 as Villarreal won 5–1 at home to Espanyol, having only two goals for the season to his name before the game. He also became the youngest player to score a hat-trick in the first half of a La Liga match. In November 2023, he tore the anterior cruciate ligament (ACL) in his left knee, and was ruled out for the rest of the 2023–24 season, making his return the following summer.

=== Crystal Palace ===
On 29 August 2025, Pino signed for Premier League club Crystal Palace in a deal worth £26 million. He was assigned the number 10 shirt, replacing the departing Eberechi Eze, who moved to Arsenal.

On 2 October 2025, Pino registered his first two goal contributions for Palace, assisting both Daniel Muñoz and Eddie Nketiah in a 2–0 away win over Dynamo Kyiv in the UEFA Conference League. Pino scored his first goal for Crystal Palace in their 3–0 win over Liverpool in the fourth round of the EFL Cup on 29 October.

== International career ==
Pino represented Spain at under-17 and under-18 levels, also acting as team captain for the latter side. Due to the isolation of some national team players following the positive COVID-19 test of Sergio Busquets, Spain's under-21 squad were called up for the international friendly against Lithuania on 8 June 2021.

Pino made his debut for the senior squad on 6 October 2021 in the 2021 UEFA Nations League semi-final against Italy, replacing the injured Ferran Torres after 49 minutes in a 2–1 victory. Four days later, he came off the bench for Pablo Sarabia in a defeat by the same score in the final against France.

Pino's first start for Spain came on 29 March 2022 in a friendly match against Iceland in A Coruña, scoring his first goal in a 5–0 victory. He was later included in Spain's squad for the 2022 FIFA World Cup, though he was an unused subtitute throughout the tournament.

On 15 June 2023, Pino scored the opener in a 2–1 victory over Italy in the 2023 UEFA Nations League semi-final. He started in the final three days later against Croatia, winning his first international trophy as Spain triumphed on penalties following a 0–0 draw.

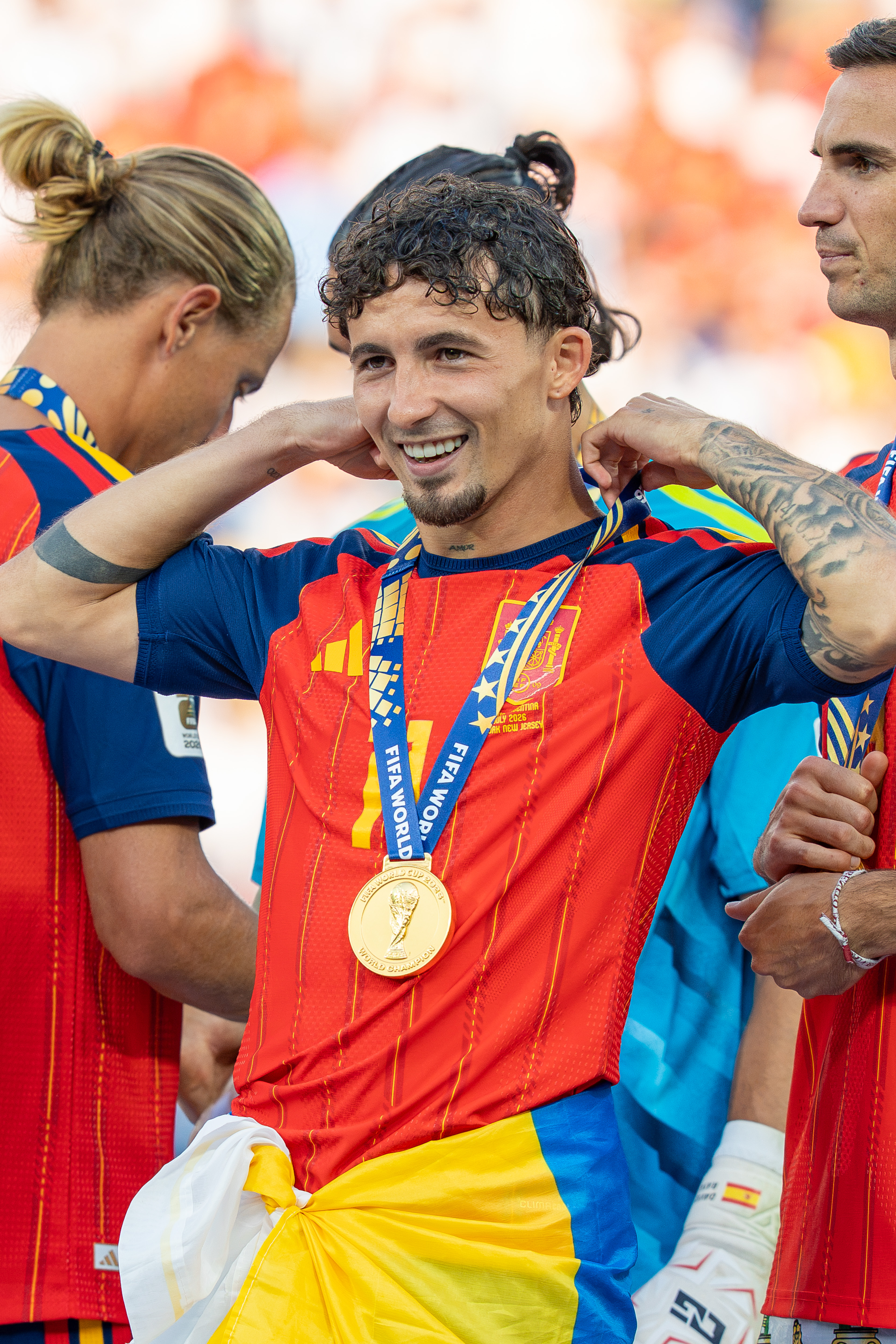
Pino with Spain in 2026

Due to his anterior cruciate ligament (ACL) tear in November 2023, Pino was unable to take part in UEFA Euro 2024. He made his return to the national team against Switzerland on 8 September 2024, and later came off the bench for Lamine Yamal in the 2025 UEFA Nations League final on 8 June 2025 as Spain lost on penalties to Portugal.

On 25 May 2026, Pino was selected in the 26-man squad for the 2026 FIFA World Cup. A month later, on 27 June, he sustained a broken collarbone in the final group-stage match against Uruguay, which ruled him out until the final.

== Career statistics ==
=== Club ===
As of match played 21 November 2026

Appearances and goals by club, season and competition
Club	Season	League			National cup (Note: Includes Copa del Rey, FA Cup)		League cup (Note: Includes EFL Cup)		Europe		Other		Total	
Club	Season	Division	Apps	Goals	Apps	Goals	Apps	Goals	Apps	Goals	Apps	Goals	Apps	Goals
Villarreal C	2019–20	Tercera División	20	3	—		—		—		—		20	3
Villarreal	2020–21	La Liga	24	3	4	3	—		9 (Note: Appearances in UEFA Europa League)	1	—		37	7
Villarreal	2021–22	La Liga	31	6	1	0	—		7 (Note: Appearances in UEFA Champions League)	1	1 (Note: Appearance in UEFA Super Cup)	0	40	7
Villarreal	2022–23	La Liga	36	4	2	0	—		8 (Note: Appearances in UEFA (Europa) Conference League)	0	—		46	4
Villarreal	2023–24	La Liga	7	0	0	0	—		3	0	—		10	0
Villarreal	2024–25	La Liga	34	4	1	0	—		—		—		35	4
Villarreal	2025–26	La Liga	2	0	—		—		—		—		2	0
Villarreal	Total		134	17	8	3	—		27	2	1	0	170	22
Crystal Palace	2025–26	Premier League	34	2	1	1	3	1	13	1	—		51	5
Crystal Palace	2026–27	Premier League	11	2	0	0	2	0	4	3	—		17	5
Crystal Palace	Total		45	4	1	1	5	1	17	4	—		68	10
Career total			199	24	9	4	5	1	44	6	1	0	258	35

=== International ===
As of match played 12 November 2026

Appearances and goals by national team and year
National team	Year	Apps	Goals
Spain	2021	2	0
Spain	2022	5	1
Spain	2023	5	1
Spain	2024	2	1
Spain	2025	5	1
Spain	2026	9	0
Total		28	4

Scores and results list Spain's goal tally first.

List of international goals scored by Yeremy Pino
No.	Date	Venue	Cap	Opponent	Score	Result	Competition
1	29 March 2022	Riazor, A Coruña, Spain	4	Iceland	3–0	5–0	Friendly
2	15 June 2023	De Grolsch Veste, Enschede, Netherlands	10	Italy	1–0	2–1	2023 UEFA Nations League Finals
3	18 November 2024	Estadio Heliodoro Rodríguez López, Santa Cruz de Tenerife, Spain	14	Switzerland	1–0	3–2	2024–25 UEFA Nations League A
4	11 October 2025	Estadio Martínez Valero, Elche, Spain	16	Georgia	1–0	2–0	2026 FIFA World Cup qualification

== Honours ==
Villarreal

- UEFA Europa League: 2020–21

Crystal Palace

- UEFA Conference League: 2025–26

Spain

- FIFA World Cup: 2026
- UEFA Nations League: 2022–23; runner-up: 2020–21, 2024–25
