= 2019–20 Villarreal CF season =

Football event in Spanish

Villarreal
2019–20 season
- President: Fernando Roig
- Head coach: Javier Calleja
- Stadium: Estadio de la Cerámica
- La Liga: 5th
- Copa del Rey: Quarter-finals
- Top goalscorer: League: Gerard (18); All: Gerard (20)
- Highest home attendance: 19,753 (vs Real Madrid, 1 September 2019)
- Lowest home attendance: 12,053 (vs Espanyol, 19 January 2020)
- Average home league attendance: 16,524
- Biggest win: Comillas 0–5 Villarreal
- Biggest defeat: Villarreal 1–4 Barcelona
Home colours	Away colours	Third colours

The 2019–20 season was Villarreal Club de Fútbol's 97th season in existence and the club's 7th consecutive season in the top flight of Spanish football. In addition to the domestic league, Villarreal participated in this season's edition of the Copa del Rey. The season was slated to cover a period from 1 July 2019 to 30 June 2020. It was extended extraordinarily beyond 30 June due to the COVID-19 pandemic in Spain.

== Players ==
=== Current squad ===
As of 30 January 2020

Note: Flags indicate national team as defined under FIFA eligibility rules; some limited exceptions apply. Players may hold more than one non-FIFA nationality.

No.	Pos.	Nation	Player
1	GK	ESP	Sergio Asenjo
2	DF	ESP	Mario Gaspar (vice-captain)
3	DF	ESP	Raúl Albiol
4	DF	ESP	Pau Torres
6	DF	ARG	Ramiro Funes Mori
7	FW	ESP	Gerard
8	MF	ESP	Santi Cazorla (3rd captain)
9	FW	COL	Carlos Bacca
10	MF	ESP	Vicente Iborra
11	MF	NGR	Samuel Chukwueze
13	GK	ESP	Andrés Fernández
14	MF	ESP	Manu Trigueros

No.	Pos.	Nation	Player
15	MF	ESP	Manu Morlanes
16	DF	ESP	Xavi Quintillà
17	FW	ESP	Paco Alcácer
18	DF	ESP	Alberto Moreno
19	MF	CMR	André-Frank Zambo Anguissa (on loan from Fulham)
20	DF	ESP	Rubén Peña
21	MF	ESP	Bruno (captain)
22	DF	MAR	Sofian Chakla
23	MF	ESP	Moi Gómez
24	MF	ESP	Javi Ontiveros
25	GK	ARG	Mariano Barbosa

=== Reserve team ===
Note: Flags indicate national team as defined under FIFA eligibility rules; some limited exceptions apply. Players may hold more than one non-FIFA nationality.

No.	Pos.	Nation	Player
26	MF	URU	Ramiro Guerra
27	DF	ROU	Andrei Rațiu
28	MF	ESP	Sergio Lozano
32	MF	ESP	Álex Baena

No.	Pos.	Nation	Player
33	DF	ESP	Pepe Castaño
34	FW	ESP	Fernando Niño
36	DF	ESP	Migue Leal
37	MF	ESP	Iván Martín

=== Out on loan ===
Note: Flags indicate national team as defined under FIFA eligibility rules; some limited exceptions apply. Players may hold more than one non-FIFA nationality.

No.	Pos.	Nation	Player
—	DF	ESP	Jaume Costa (at (Spain) Valencia until 30 June 2020)
—	DF	ESP	Enric Franquesa (at (Spain) Mirandés until 30 June 2020)
—	DF	ESP	Álvaro González (at (France) Marseille until 30 June 2020)
—	DF	ESP	Miguelón (at (Spain) Huesca until 30 June 2020)

No.	Pos.	Nation	Player
—	MF	ESP	Alfonso Pedraza (at (Spain) Real Betis until 30 June 2020)
—	FW	QAT	Akram Afif (at (Qatar) Al-Sadd until 30 June 2020)
—	FW	ESP	Dani Raba (at (Spain) Huesca until 30 June 2020)
—	FW	TUR	Enes Ünal (at (Spain) Valladolid until 30 June 2020)

== Transfers ==
=== In ===
Date	Player	From	Type	Fee	Ref
30 June 2019	(Qatar) Akram Afif	(Qatar) Al Sadd	Loan return		
30 June 2019	(Uruguay) Ramiro Guerra	Gimnàstic	Loan return		
30 June 2019	(Senegal) Alfred N'Diaye	Málaga	Loan return		
30 June 2019	(Portugal) Rúben Semedo	(Portugal) Rio Ave	Loan return		
30 June 2019	(Argentina) Leo Suárez	Mallorca	Loan return		
4 July 2019	(Spain) Raúl Albiol	(Italy) Napoli	Transfer	€5M	
4 July 2019	(Spain) Rubén Peña	Eibar	Transfer	€8M	
9 July 2019	(Spain) Alberto Moreno	(England) Liverpool	Transfer	Free	
18 July 2019	(Spain) Moi Gómez	Sporting Gijón	Transfer	Undisclosed	
26 July 2019	(Cameroon) André-Frank Zambo Anguissa	(England) Fulham	Loan		
20 August 2019	(Spain) Javi Ontiveros	Málaga	Transfer	€7.5M	
30 January 2020	(Spain) Paco Alcácer	(Germany) Borussia Dortmund	Transfer	€23M	

=== Out ===
Date	Player	To	Type	Fee	Ref
1 July 2019	(Qatar) Akram Afif	(Qatar) Al Sadd	Loan		
1 July 2019	(Russia) Denis Cheryshev	Valencia	Buyout clause	€6M	
1 July 2019	(Spain) Pablo Fornals	(England) West Ham United	Transfer	€28M	
1 July 2019	(Spain) Javi Fuego	Sporting Gijón	Transfer	Free	
1 July 2019	(Italy) Nicola Sansone	(Italy) Bologna	Buyout clause	€7.5M	
1 July 2019	(Portugal) Rúben Semedo	(Greece) Olympiacos	Transfer	€4.5M	
1 July 2019	(Italy) Roberto Soriano	(Italy) Bologna	Buyout clause	€7.5M	
11 July 2019	(Spain) Miguelón	Huesca	Loan		
16 July 2019	(Spain) Alfonso Pedraza	Real Betis	Loan		
19 July 2019	(Spain) Álvaro	(France) Marseille	Loan		
5 August 2019	(Spain) Dani Raba	Huesca	Loan		
7 August 2019	(Spain) Víctor Ruiz	(Turkey) Beşiktaş	Transfer	€2.5M	
13 August 2019	(Spain) Jaume Costa	Valencia	Loan		
30 August 2019	(Senegal) Alfred N'Diaye	(Saudi Arabia) Al-Shabab	Transfer	€6M	
2 January 2020	(Argentina) Cristian Espinoza	(United States) San Jose Earthquakes	Buyout clause	€2.3M	
12 January 2020	(Argentina) Leo Suárez	(Mexico) América	Transfer	Undisclosed	
20 January 2020	(Cameroon) Karl Toko Ekambi	(France) Lyon	Loan		
29 January 2020	(Argentina) Santiago Cáseres	(Mexico) América	Loan		

== Pre-season and friendlies ==
Win Draw Loss

13 July 2019 Friendly	Villarreal	3–0	West Bromwich Albion	La Nucía, Spain
19:00 CEST (UTC+2)	Gerard 9'; Trigueros 45+4' (pen.); Bacca 82'	Report		Stadium: Estadi Olímpic Camilo Cano

20 July 2019 Friendly	Levante	1–2	Villarreal	El Saler, Spain
19:00 CEST (UTC+2)	Bardhi 88'	Report	Cazorla 26'; Bacca 64'	Stadium: Parador de El Saler

26 July 2019 Friendly	FC Augsburg	2–6	Villarreal	Schwaz, Austria
18:00 CEST (UTC+2)	Max 33'; Malone 88'	Report	Raba 11', 23'; Iborra 15'; Moreno 60'; Bacca 63'; Niño 78'	Stadium: Silberstadt Arena

28 July 2019 Friendly	1. FC Köln	1–3	Villarreal	Kufstein, Austria
18:15 CEST (UTC+2)	Terodde 2' (pen.)	Report	Iborra (yellow card) 33'; Funes Mori 41'; Gerard 48'; Costa (yellow card) 59'; Bacca 75'	Stadium: Kufstein Arena; Referee: Andreas Heiß (Austria)

2 August 2019 Friendly	Schalke 04	3–1	Villarreal	Saalfelden, Austria
18:00 CEST (UTC+2)	Burgstaller 22'; Boujellab 48'; Oczipka 87'	Report	Iborra 35'	Stadium: Saalfelden Arena; Attendance: 1,500; Referee: Stefan Eder (Austria)

7 August 2019 Friendly	La Nucía	0–4	Villarreal	La Nucía, Spain
19:30 CEST (UTC+2)		Report	Morlanes 50'; Albiol 88'; Pedraza 90+2' (o.g.); Cazorla 90+3'	Stadium: Estadi Olímpic Camilo Cano

10 August 2019 Friendly	Bologna	3–4	Villarreal	Serravalle, San Marino
20:45 CEST (UTC+2)	Denswil (yellow card) 19'; Palacio 24'; Santander 75'; Tomiyasu 82'	Report	Gómez 5'; Cazorla 63'; Chukwueze 66'; Albiol (yellow card) 81'; Gerard 85'	Stadium: San Marino Stadium; Referee: Luca Barbeno (San Marino)

== Competitions ==
=== Overall record ===
Competition	First match	Last match	Starting round	Final position	Record							
Competition	First match	Last match	Starting round	Final position	Pld	W	D	L	GF	GA	GD	Win %
La Liga	17 August 2019	19 July 2020	Matchday 1	5th	38	18	6	14	63	49	+14	47.37
Copa del Rey	18 December 2019	5 February 2020	First round	Quarter-finals	5	4	0	1	14	5	+9	80.00
Total					43	22	6	15	77	54	+23	51.16

Source: Soccerway

=== La Liga ===
==== League table ====
Pos	Team	Pld	W	D	L	GF	GA	GD	Pts	Qualification or relegation
3	Atlético Madrid	38	18	16	4	51	27	+24	70	Qualification for the Champions League group stage
4	Sevilla	38	19	13	6	54	34	+20	70	Qualification for the Champions League group stage
5	Villarreal	38	18	6	14	63	49	+14	60	Qualification for the Europa League group stage
6	Real Sociedad	38	16	8	14	56	48	+8	56	Qualification for the Europa League group stage
7	Granada	38	16	8	14	52	45	+7	56	Qualification for the Europa League second qualifying round (Note: The 2020 Copa del Rey Final was postponed due to the COVID-19 pandemic in Spain and could not be completed by the UEFA registration deadline of 3 August 2020, so the fifth- and sixth-placed teams in the 2019–20 La Liga, Villarreal and Real Sociedad, entered the 2020–21 UEFA Europa League at the group stage, and the seventh-placed team, Granada, entered at the second qualifying round.)

Source: La Liga, Soccerway
Rules for classification: 1) Points; 2) Head-to-head points; 3) Head-to-head goal difference; 4) Goal difference; 5) Goals scored; 6) Fair-play points (Note: Head-to-head record is used only after all the matches between the teams in question have been played)

==== Results summary ====
Overall								Home						Away					
Pld	W	D	L	GF	GA	GD	Pts	W	D	L	GF	GA	GD	W	D	L	GF	GA	GD
38	18	6	14	63	49	+14	60	9	5	5	37	25	+12	9	1	9	26	24	+2

Source: La Liga

==== Results by round ====
Round	1	2	3	4	5	6	7	8	9	10	11	12	13	14	15	16	17	18	19	20	21	22	23	24	25	26	27	28	29	30	31	32	33	34	35	36	37	38
Ground	H	A	H	A	H	A	H	A	A	H	A	H	A	H	A	H	A	H	A	H	A	H	A	H	A	A	H	A	H	A	H	H	A	H	A	H	A	H
Result	D	L	D	W	W	L	W	L	W	W	L	D	L	L	L	D	W	W	W	L	W	W	D	W	L	L	L	W	W	W	D	W	W	L	W	L	L	W
Position	10	13	16	10	7	8	8	9	7	7	7	8	11	12	13	13	13	10	9	9	8	7	8	6	7	8	8	8	7	6	6	6	5	5	5	5	5	5

Source: La Liga
A = Away; H = Home; W = Win; D = Draw; L = Loss

==== Matches ====
The La Liga schedule was announced on 4 July 2019.

17 August 2019 1	Villarreal	4–4	Granada	Villarreal
21:00 CEST (UTC+2)	Cazorla 35' (pen.), (yellow card) 36'; Albiol (yellow card) 45+3'; Gómez 53'; Gerard 65'; Zambo Anguissa (yellow card) 70'; Chukwueze 73'	Report	Vico 51' (pen.); Germán (yellow card) 59'; Machís 62'; Soldado 75'; Puertas 81'	Stadium: Estadio de la Cerámica; Attendance: 14,836; Referee: Adrián Cordero Vega

23 August 2019 2	Levante	2–1	Villarreal	Valencia
22:00 CEST (UTC+2)	Roger 68' (pen.), 73' (pen.); Vukčević (yellow card) 80'	Report	Gerard 3'; Fernández (yellow card) 67'; Albiol (yellow card) 70'	Stadium: Estadi Ciutat de València; Attendance: 18,914; Referee: José Luis Munuera Montero

1 September 2019 3	Villarreal	2–2	Real Madrid	Villarreal
21:00 CEST (UTC+2)	Gerard 12'; Quintillà (yellow card) 52'; Gómez 74'	Report	Bale 45+1', 86', (yellow card) 90+2' (yellow-red card) 90+4'; Mendy (yellow card) 77'; Casemiro (yellow card) 90'	Stadium: Estadio de la Cerámica; Attendance: 19,753; Referee: Jesús Gil Manzano

14 September 2019 4	Leganés	0–3	Villarreal	Leganés
16:00 CEST (UTC+2)	Pérez (yellow card) 81'; Mesa (yellow card) 84'	Report	Gerard 26', 90+3'; Silva 39' (o.g.)	Stadium: Estadio Municipal de Butarque; Attendance: 7,670; Referee: David Medié Jiménez

21 September 2019 5	Villarreal	2–0	Valladolid	Villarreal
13:00 CEST (UTC+2)	Quintillà (yellow card) 40'; Iborra (yellow card) 45+3'; Cazorla 77' (pen.); Ontiveros 89'	Report	Barba (yellow card) 60'	Stadium: Estadio de la Cerámica; Attendance: 16,195; Referee: César Soto Grado

24 September 2019 6	Barcelona	2–1	Villarreal	Barcelona
21:00 CEST (UTC+2)	Griezmann 6', (yellow card) 47'; Arthur 15'; Roberto (yellow card) 27'; Junior (yellow card) 82'; Busquets (yellow card) 90'	Report	Cazorla 44'; Zambo Anguissa (yellow card) 72'; Albiol (yellow card) 82'	Stadium: Camp Nou; Attendance: 70,316; Referee: Ricardo de Burgos Bengoetxea

27 September 2019 7	Villarreal	5–1	Real Betis	Villarreal
21:00 CEST (UTC+2)	Gómez (yellow card) 22'; Toko Ekambi 39', 76'; Quintillà (yellow card) 63'; Cazorla 68' (pen.); Gerard 90+2'; Chukwueze 90+4'	Report	Emerson 48'; Joaquín (yellow card) 53'; Feddal (yellow card) 66'	Stadium: Estadio de la Cerámica; Attendance: 18,135; Referee: Xavier Estrada Fernández

5 October 2019 8	Osasuna	2–1	Villarreal	Pamplona
21:00 CEST (UTC+2)	Vidal (yellow card) 13'; Roncaglia 46'; Oier (yellow card) 70'; Ávila 79'	Report	Torres 5'; Albiol (yellow card) 67'; Bacca (yellow card) 90+2'	Stadium: El Sadar; Attendance: 15,415; Referee: Valentín Pizarro Gómez

20 October 2019 9	Espanyol	0–1	Villarreal	Cornellà de Llobregat
16:00 CEST (UTC+2)	Espinosa (yellow card) 90+3'; Di. López (yellow card) 90+6'	Report	Toko Ekambi 17'; Iborra (yellow card) 51'	Stadium: RCDE Stadium; Attendance: 20,653; Referee: Carlos del Cerro Grande

25 October 2019 10	Villarreal	4–1	Alavés	Villarreal
21:00 CEST (UTC+2)	Toko Ekambi 13', 66'; Mario (yellow card) 53'; Torres (yellow card) 77'; Gerard 84'; Ontiveros 90+1'	Report	Joselu (yellow card) 23'; Pérez 50'; Magallán (yellow card) 65'	Stadium: Estadio de la Cerámica; Attendance: 16,049; Referee: David Medié Jiménez

31 October 2019 11	Eibar	2–1	Villarreal	Eibar
19:00 CET (UTC+1)	Kike 62'; Orellana 90+5'	Report	Zambo Anguissa (yellow card) 15'; Iborra (yellow card) 74'; Quintillà (yellow card) 79'; Gerard 88'	Stadium: Ipurua Municipal Stadium; Attendance: 5,632; Referee: Guillermo Cuadra Fernández

3 November 2019 12	Villarreal	0–0	Athletic Bilbao	Villarreal
14:00 CET (UTC+1)	Iborra (yellow card) 60'; Ontiveros (yellow card) 90+3'	Report		Stadium: Estadio de la Cerámica; Attendance: 17,460; Referee: Santiago Jaime Latre

10 November 2019 13	Mallorca	3–1	Villarreal	Palma
12:00 CET (UTC+1)	Junior 13' (pen.); Rodríguez 23' (pen.), (yellow card) 55'; Kubo 53'; Febas (yellow card) 90+4'	Report	Asenjo (yellow card) 22'; Cazorla 49' (pen.); Peña (yellow card) 60'; Albiol (yellow card) 77'	Stadium: Estadi de Son Moix; Attendance: 8,348; Referee: Carlos del Cerro Grande

24 November 2019 14	Villarreal	1–3	Celta Vigo	Villarreal
18:30 CET (UTC+1)	Iborra (yellow card) 11'; Chukwueze 59'; Funes Mori (yellow card) 67'; Torres (yellow card) 79'	Report	Sisto 54'; Sergio (yellow card) 74'; Aspas 79', 90+4'; Mina (yellow card) 90+1'	Stadium: Estadio de la Cerámica; Attendance: 17,352; Referee: José Luis Munuera Montero

30 November 2019 15	Valencia	2–1	Villarreal	Valencia
21:00 CET (UTC+1)	Rodrigo 49'; Torres 70'; Parejo (yellow card) 75'	Report	Albiol (yellow card) 17'; Zambo Anguissa 54'; Gerard (yellow card) 55'	Stadium: Mestalla; Attendance: 38,988; Referee: César Soto Grado

6 December 2019 16	Villarreal	0–0	Atlético Madrid	Villarreal
21:00 CET (UTC+1)	Zambo Anguissa (yellow card) 38'; Trigueros (yellow card) 74'	Report	Morata (yellow card) 15'	Stadium: Estadio de la Cerámica; Attendance: 17,964; Referee: Alejandro Hernández Hernández

15 December 2019 17	Sevilla	1–2	Villarreal	Seville
18:30 CET (UTC+1)	Munir 61'; Óliver (yellow card) 63'; Diego Carlos (yellow card) 90+4'	Report	Albiol 13'; Toko Ekambi 74'	Stadium: Ramón Sánchez Pizjuán; Attendance: 36,521; Referee: Adrián Cordero Vega

21 December 2019 18	Villarreal	1–0	Getafe	Villarreal
18:30 CET (UTC+1)	Trigueros (yellow card) 28'; Gómez 52'; Gerard (yellow card) 84'	Report	Mata (yellow card) 40'; Olivera (yellow card) 59' (yellow-red card) 61'; Ángel (yellow card) 85'; Suárez (yellow card) 89'	Stadium: Estadio de la Cerámica; Attendance: 14,829; Referee: Santiago Jaime Latre

5 January 2020 19	Real Sociedad	1–2	Villarreal	San Sebastián
14:00 CET (UTC+1)	Willian José 22'; Zubeldia (yellow card) 30'; Zaldúa (yellow card) 70'; Guevara (yellow card) 72'; Januzaj (yellow card) 85'; Portu (yellow card) 90+6'	Report	Torres (yellow card) 55'; Trigueros 58' (pen.); Mario (yellow card) 61'; Moreno (yellow card) 65'; Cazorla 72'; Albiol (yellow card) 77'	Stadium: Anoeta; Attendance: 31,538; Referee: José María Sánchez Martínez

19 January 2020 20	Villarreal	1–2	Espanyol	Villarreal
16:00 CET (UTC+1)	Trigueros (yellow card) 41'; Cazorla 62' (pen.)	Report	Da. López 5'; Vilà (yellow card) 24'; J. López (yellow card) 32' (red card) 59'; De Tomás 47', (yellow card) 76'	Stadium: Estadio de la Cerámica; Attendance: 12,053; Referee: Pablo González Fuertes

25 January 2020 21	Alavés	1–2	Villarreal	Vitoria-Gasteiz
18:30 CET (UTC+1)	Ely (yellow card) 45+1'; Joselu 80'; Duarte (yellow card) 82'	Report	Bacca 10'; Quintillà (yellow card) 70'; Niño 89'	Stadium: Mendizorrotza; Attendance: 18,153; Referee: José Luis Munuera Montero

2 February 2020 22	Villarreal	3–1	Osasuna	Villarreal
18:30 CET (UTC+1)	Alcácer 45+1'; Peña 54'; Cazorla 59' (pen.), (yellow card) 67'; Zambo Anguissa (yellow card) 90+1'; Niño (yellow card) 90+2'	Report	Estupiñán (yellow card) 3'; Aridane 48', (yellow card) 57'	Stadium: Estadio de la Cerámica; Attendance: 17,081; Referee: Valentín Pizarro Gómez

8 February 2020 23	Valladolid	1–1	Villarreal	Valladolid
18:30 CET (UTC+1)	Alcaraz 15'; Toni (yellow card) 58'; Moyano (yellow card) 58'; García (yellow card) 78'	Report	Albiol (yellow card) 41'; Gerard 54'; Iborra (yellow card) 60'; Peña (yellow card) 71'	Stadium: José Zorrilla; Attendance: 19,557; Referee: Alejandro Hernández Hernández

15 February 2020 24	Villarreal	2–1	Levante	Villarreal
18:30 CET (UTC+1)	Gerard 9'; Iborra (yellow card) 22'; Trigueros (yellow card) 53'; Gómez 61'; Peña (yellow card) 69'	Report	Mayoral 56'; Postigo (yellow card) 90'	Stadium: Estadio de la Cerámica; Attendance: 17,269; Referee: Mario Melero López

23 February 2020 25	Atlético Madrid	3–1	Villarreal	Madrid
21:00 CET (UTC+1)	Correa 40'; Saúl (yellow card) 61'; Koke 64'; Félix 74', (yellow card) 90'	Report	Alcácer 16'; Peña (yellow card) 25'	Stadium: Wanda Metropolitano; Attendance: 54,462; Referee: Ricardo de Burgos Bengoetxea

1 March 2020 26	Athletic Bilbao	1–0	Villarreal	Bilbao
14:00 CET (UTC+1)	Berchiche (yellow card) 21'; Capa (yellow card) 43'; R. García 56' (pen.), (yellow card) 90+2'; Córdoba (yellow card) 63'; Vesga (yellow card) 85'; Núñez (yellow card) 90+3'	Report	Cazorla (yellow card) 21'; Torres (yellow card) 54'; Iborra (yellow card) 55'; Zambo Anguissa (yellow card) 63'; Gerard (yellow card) 65'; Chukwueze (yellow card) 77'	Stadium: San Mamés; Attendance: 36,350; Referee: David Medié Jiménez

8 March 2020 27	Villarreal	1–2	Leganés	Villarreal
18:30 CET (UTC+1)	Gerard 5'; Moreno (yellow card) 42'; Peña (yellow card) 79'; Alcácer (yellow card) 79'; Iborra (yellow card) 90+2'	Report	Óscar 47', 70' (pen.); Rodrigues (yellow card) 80'; Awaziem (yellow card) 90+3'; Silva (yellow card) 90+6'	Stadium: Estadio de la Cerámica; Attendance: 16,143; Referee: César Soto Grado

13 June 2020 28	Celta Vigo	0–1	Villarreal	Vigo
17:00 CEST (UTC+2)	Diop (yellow card) 40'	Report	Iborra (yellow card) 37'; Trigueros 90+1'	Stadium: Abanca-Balaídos; Attendance: 0 Referee: Valentín Pizarro Gómez
Note: The match was originally scheduled for 15 March, but was postponed due to the COVID-19 pandemic, and rescheduled to 13 June. It was played behind closed doors.

16 June 2020 29	Villarreal	1–0	Mallorca	Villarreal
19:30 CEST (UTC+2)	Bacca 16'; Moreno (yellow card) 18'; Albiol (yellow card) 45'; Torres (yellow card) 45+2'	Report	Sedlar (yellow card) 5'; Gámez (yellow card) 27'; Febas (yellow card) 62'; Raíllo (yellow card) 65'	Stadium: Estadio de la Cerámica; Attendance: 0 Referee: Xavier Estrada Fernández
Note: The match was originally scheduled for 22 March, but was postponed due to the 2020 coronavirus pandemic, and rescheduled to 16 June. It was played behind closed doors.

19 June 2020 30	Granada	0–1	Villarreal	Granada
19:30 CEST (UTC+2)		Report	Gerard 11'; Moreno (yellow card) 20'; Chukwueze (yellow card) 86'; Asenjo (yellow card) 90'	Stadium: Nuevo Los Cármenes; Attendance: 0 Referee: Guillermo Cuadra Fernández
Note: The match was originally scheduled for 5 April, but was postponed due to the 2020 coronavirus pandemic, and rescheduled to 19 June. It was played behind closed doors.

22 June 2020 31	Villarreal	2–2	Sevilla	Villarreal
19:30 CEST (UTC+2)	Alcácer 18'; Moreno (yellow card) 27'; Torres 45+4'; Trigueros (yellow card) 73'; Soriano (yellow card) 90+3'	Report	Gómez (yellow card) 27'; Escudero 39'; Fernando (yellow card) 45+3'; Munir 63'; Ocampos (yellow card) 68'	Stadium: Estadio de la Cerámica; Attendance: 0 Referee: José María Sánchez Martínez
Note: The match was originally scheduled for 12 April, but was postponed due to the 2020 coronavirus pandemic, and rescheduled to 22 June. It was played behind closed doors.

28 June 2020 32	Villarreal	2–0	Valencia	Villarreal
17:00 CEST (UTC+2)	Alcácer 14'; Gerard 44'	Report	Guillamón (yellow card) 43'; Costa (yellow card) 50'	Stadium: Estadio de la Cerámica; Attendance: 0 Referee: José Luis González González
Note: The match was originally scheduled for 22 April, but was postponed due to the 2020 coronavirus pandemic, and rescheduled to 28 June. It was played behind closed doors.

1 July 2020 33	Real Betis	0–2	Villarreal	Seville
22:00 CEST (UTC+2)	Bartra (yellow card) 5'; Fekir (yellow card) 45+1' (yellow-red card) 45+3'; Rodríguez (yellow card) 81'	Report	Gerard 7' (pen.), 30'; Moreno (yellow card) 69'	Stadium: Benito Villamarín; Attendance: 0 Referee: Jesús Gil Manzano
Note: The match was originally scheduled for 26 April, but was postponed due to the 2020 coronavirus pandemic, and rescheduled to 1 July. It was played behind closed doors.

5 July 2020 34	Villarreal	1–4	Barcelona	Villarreal
22:00 CEST (UTC+2)	Gerard 14'; Torres (yellow card) 18'	Report	Torres 3' (o.g.); Suárez 20'; Griezmann 45'; Fati 86'	Stadium: Estadio de la Cerámica; Attendance: 0 Referee: Carlos del Cerro Grande
Note: The match was originally scheduled for 3 May, but was postponed due to the 2020 coronavirus pandemic, and rescheduled to 5 July. It was played behind closed doors.

8 July 2020 35	Getafe	1–3	Villarreal	Getafe
20:30 CEST (UTC+2)	Soria (yellow card) 63'; Ángel (yellow card) 68'; Duro 80'; Arambarri (yellow card) 86'; Portillo (yellow card) 87'; Nyom (red card) 90+7'; Exteita (red card) 90+7'; Suarez (red card) 90+7'	Report	Cazorla 66' (pen.), 86' (pen.); Gerard (yellow card) 89'; Peña 90+3'; Iborra (red card) 90+7'	Stadium: Coliseum Alfonso Pérez; Attendance: 0 Referee: Xavier Estrada Fernández
Note: The match was originally scheduled for 10 May, but was postponed due to the 2020 coronavirus pandemic, and rescheduled to 8 July. It was played behind closed doors.

13 July 2020 36	Villarreal	1–2	Real Sociedad	Villarreal
19:30 CEST (UTC+2)	Ontiveros (yellow card) 35'; Trigueros (yellow card) 36'; Cazorla 85'	Report	Merino (yellow card) 2'; Willian José 61'; Le Normand (yellow card) 70'; Llorente 75'	Stadium: Estadio de la Cerámica; Attendance: 0 Referee: Guillermo Cuadra Fernández
Note: The match was originally scheduled for 13 May, but was postponed due to the 2020 coronavirus pandemic, and rescheduled to 12 July. It was played behind closed doors.

16 July 2020 37	Real Madrid	2–1	Villarreal	Madrid
21:00 CEST (UTC+2)	Benzema 29', 77' (pen.); Carvajal (yellow card) 54'; Modrić (yellow card) 62'; Isco (yellow card) 86'	Report	Chakla (yellow card) 18'; Quintillà (yellow card) 68'; Iborra 83'	Stadium: Alfredo di Stéfano; Attendance: 0 Referee: Alejandro José Hernández Hernández
Note: The match was originally scheduled for 17 May, but was postponed due to the 2020 coronavirus pandemic, and rescheduled to 16 July. It was played behind closed doors.

19 July 2020 38	Villarreal	4–0	Eibar	Villarreal
18:30 CEST (UTC+2)	Zambo Anguissa 71'; Gerard 86', 89'; Gómez 90+4'	Report		Stadium: Estadio de la Cerámica; Attendance: 0 Referee: Javier Alberola Rojas
Note: The match was originally scheduled for 24 May, but was postponed due to the 2020 coronavirus pandemic, and rescheduled to 19 July. It was played behind closed doors.

=== Copa del Rey ===
18 December 2019 First round	Comillas	0–5	Villarreal	Logroño
18:00 CET (UTC+1)	Del Río (yellow card) 60'	Report	Suárez 31'; Bacca 34', 75', 84'; Cazorla 78'	Stadium: Las Gaunas; Attendance: 4,000; Referee: Eduardo Prieto Iglesias

11 January 2020 Second round	Orihuela	1–2 (a.e.t.)	Villarreal	Orihuela
21:00 CET (UTC+1)	Pallarés 83'; Marín (yellow card) 103'	Report	Gerard 73', 118'; Iborra (yellow card) 98'	Stadium: Los Arcos; Attendance: 1,800; Referee: Mario Melero López

22 January 2020 Round of 32	Girona	0–3	Villarreal	Girona
21:00 CET (UTC+1)	Bigas (yellow card) 54'; Gumbau (yellow card) 89'	Report	Peña (yellow card) 53'; Funes Mori 54'; Quintillà (yellow card) 67'; Cazorla 70'; Chukwueze 72'	Stadium: Montilivi; Attendance: 928; Referee: Guillermo Cuadra Fernández

29 January 2020 Round of 16	Rayo Vallecano	0–2	Villarreal	Madrid
19:00 CET (UTC+1)	Milić (yellow card) 28'	Report	Funes Mori (yellow card) 25'; Cazorla (yellow card) 80', (goal) 85'; Niño 84'	Stadium: Vallecas; Attendance: 7,500; Referee: Eduardo Prieto Iglesias

5 February 2020 Quarter-finals	Mirandés	4–2	Villarreal	Miranda de Ebro
21:00 CET (UTC+1)	Matheus 17'; Merquelanz 45+3', (yellow card) 90+1'; Onaindia 58'; Sánchez 90+2'	Report	Ontiveros 32'; Iborra (yellow card) 34'; Chakla (yellow card) 38'; Mario (yellow card) 52'; Cazorla 56' (pen.), (yellow card) 78'; Chukwueze (yellow card) 64'	Stadium: Anduva; Attendance: 4,428; Referee: Ricardo de Burgos Bengoetxea

== Statistics ==
=== Squad statistics ===
Last updated on the end of the season.

No.	Pos	Nat	Player	Total		La Liga		Copa del Rey	
No.	Pos	Nat	Player	Apps	Goals	Apps	Goals	Apps	Goals
Goalkeepers
1	GK	(Spain) ESP	Sergio Asenjo	34	0	34	0	0	0
13	GK	(Spain) ESP	Andrés Fernández	9	0	4	0	5	0
25	GK	(Argentina) ARG	Mariano Barbosa	0	0	0	0	0	0
Defenders
2	DF	(Spain) ESP	Mario Gaspar	28	0	22+3	0	2+1	0
3	DF	(Spain) ESP	Raúl Albiol	38	1	36	1	2	0
4	DF	(Spain) ESP	Pau Torres	36	2	33+1	2	2	0
6	DF	(Argentina) ARG	Ramiro Funes Mori	12	1	5+2	0	5	1
16	DF	(Spain) ESP	Xavi Quintillà	23	0	17+2	0	3+1	0
18	DF	(Spain) ESP	Alberto Moreno	19	0	17+1	0	1	0
20	DF	(Spain) ESP	Rubén Peña	30	2	21+5	2	3+1	0
22	DF	(Morocco) MAR	Sofian Chakla	3	0	2	0	1	0
36	DF	(Spain) ESP	Migue Leal	1	0	0	0	1	0
Midfielders
8	MF	(Spain) ESP	Santi Cazorla	40	15	29+6	11	3+2	4
10	MF	(Spain) ESP	Vicente Iborra	37	1	33+1	1	1+2	0
11	MF	(Nigeria) NGR	Samuel Chukwueze	41	4	20+17	3	2+2	1
14	MF	(Spain) ESP	Manu Trigueros	31	2	17+12	2	2	0
15	MF	(Spain) ESP	Manu Morlanes	13	0	3+6	0	4	0
19	MF	(Cameroon) CMR	André-Frank Zambo Anguissa	39	2	28+8	2	3	0
21	MF	(Spain) ESP	Bruno	7	0	1+6	0	0	0
23	MF	(Spain) ESP	Moi Gómez	41	5	26+11	5	2+2	0
24	MF	(Spain) ESP	Javi Ontiveros	35	3	7+23	2	5	1
28	MF	(Spain) ESP	Sergio Lozano	1	0	0	0	1	0
32	MF	(Spain) ESP	Álex Baena	2	0	0+1	0	0+1	0
Forwards
7	FW	(Spain) ESP	Gerard Moreno	37	20	33+2	18	1+1	2
9	FW	(Colombia) COL	Carlos Bacca	23	5	7+12	2	4	3
17	FW	(Spain) ESP	Paco Alcácer	14	4	11+2	4	0+1	0
34	FW	(Spain) ESP	Fernando Niño	7	2	1+4	1	0+2	1
Players who have made an appearance or had a squad number this season but have left the club
5	MF	(Argentina) ARG	Santiago Cáseres	0	0	0	0	0	0
22	MF	(Argentina) ARG	Leo Suárez	1	1	0	0	1	1
17	FW	(Cameroon) CMR	Karl Toko Ekambi	19	6	11+7	6	1	0
