= Fer Niño =

Spanish footballer

Personal information
- Full name: Fernando Niño Rodríguez
- Date of birth: 24 October 2000 (age 26)
- Place of birth: Rota, Spain
- Height: 1.91 m (6 ft 3 in)
- Position: Forward

Team information
- Current team: Elche
- Number: 14

Youth career
- 2011–2013: Rota
- 2013–2014: Cádiz
- 2014–2016: Balón de Cádiz
- 2016–2019: Villarreal

Senior career*
Years	Team	Apps	(Gls)
2019–2020	Villarreal C	13	(4)
2020–2023	Villarreal B	43	(4)
2020–2023	Villarreal	25	(4)
2021–2022	→ Mallorca (loan)	23	(2)
2023–2026	Burgos	116	(24)
2026–	Elche	10	(6)

International career
2021	Spain U21	5	(2)
- * Club domestic league appearances and goals as of 16:11, 24 October 2026 (UTC)

Fernando "Fer" Niño Rodríguez (born 24 October 2000) is a Spanish professional footballer who plays as a forward for La Liga club Elche.

== Club career ==
=== Villarreal ===
Niño was born in Rota, Andalusia, and joined Villarreal CF's academy in 2016 from Balón de Cádiz CF in his native region. He made his senior debut with the former's C team on 24 August 2019, starting in a 3–0 Tercera División away win against CF Recambios Colón.

Niño scored his first league goal on 26 October 2019, opening the 5–0 home rout of UD Benigànim. The following 22 January, when he still had not even appeared for the reserves, he made his first-team debut by coming on as a second-half substitute for Pau Torres in a 3–0 away victory over Girona FC in the round of 32 of the Copa del Rey.

Niño played his first La Liga match on 25 January 2020, in a 2–1 win at Deportivo Alavés; replacing Carlos Bacca in the 88th minute, he scored the winner the following minute. On 12 November, he renewed his contract until 2024. He contributed five appearances to their victorious campaign in the UEFA Europa League, netting against Maccabi Tel Aviv FC (group phase, 4–0) and FC Red Bull Salzburg (round of 32, 2–0).

In a pre-season friendly against Leicester City in August 2021, Niño broke Wesley Fofana's leg with a late challenge, apologising for the action the following day on social media. Later that month, he was loaned to RCD Mallorca for the season.

Back to the Estadio de la Cerámica for 2022–23, Niño was assigned back to the B team, now in the Segunda División.

=== Burgos ===
On 22 June 2023, Niño signed a three-year contract with Burgos CF also in the second tier. He scored six goals in 2023–24, improving to a career-best ten the following season.

=== Elche ===
On 29 July 2026, Niño returned to the top division after agreeing to a four-year deal at Elche CF.

== International career ==
Niño made his debut for the Spain under-21 side on 31 May 2021, in a 2–1 extra time defeat of Croatia in the quarter-finals of the 2021 UEFA European Championship. His first goals came on 3 September, when he scored a brace in the 4–1 win over Russia for the 2023 European Championship qualifiers; his Villarreal teammate Yeremy Pino added the other two.

== Personal life ==
Niño's father, also named Fernando, was also a footballer. A central defender, he spent most of his career with Mallorca.

== Career statistics ==
As of match played 27 May 2023

Appearances and goals by club, season and competition
Club	Season	League			National Cup		Continental		Total	
Club	Season	Division	Apps	Goals	Apps	Goals	Apps	Goals	Apps	Goals
Villarreal B	2019–20	Segunda División B	4	0	—		—		4	0
Villarreal B	2022–23	Segunda División	39	4	—		—		39	4
Villarreal B	Total		43	4	0	0	0	0	43	4
Villarreal	2019–20	La Liga	5	1	2	1	—		7	2
Villarreal	2020–21	La Liga	17	3	5	3	5 (Note: Appearances in UEFA Europa League)	2	27	8
Villarreal	Total		22	4	7	4	5	2	34	10
Mallorca (loan)	2021–22	La Liga	23	2	2	0	—		25	2
Career total			88	10	9	4	5	2	102	16

== Honours ==
Villarreal

- UEFA Europa League: 2020–21
