= Sergio Asenjo =

Spanish footballer (born 1989)

Personal information
- Full name: Sergio Asenjo Andrés
- Date of birth: 28 June 1989 (age 37)
- Place of birth: Palencia, Spain
- Height: 1.89 m (6 ft 2 in)
- Position: Goalkeeper

Youth career
- San Juanillo
- 2005–2006: Valladolid

Senior career*
Years	Team	Apps	(Gls)
2006–2008	Valladolid B	39	(0)
2006–2009	Valladolid	47	(0)
2009–2014	Atlético Madrid	18	(0)
2011	→ Málaga (loan)	5	(0)
2013–2014	→ Villarreal (loan)	35	(0)
2014–2022	Villarreal	193	(0)
2022–2023	Valladolid	10	(0)
Total		347	(0)

International career
2006	Spain U17	10	(0)
2007	Spain U19	8	(0)
2009	Spain U20	4	(0)
2008–2010	Spain U21	15	(0)
2016	Spain	1	(0)
- * Club domestic league appearances and goals

Sergio Asenjo Andrés (Spanish pronunciation: [ˈseɾxjo aˈseŋxo]; born 28 June 1989) is a Spanish former professional footballer who played as a goalkeeper.

He started his career with Valladolid in 2007, making 47 senior appearances in his first spell. He moved to Atlético Madrid in summer 2009 and spent five seasons with the club, during which he was also loaned to Málaga and Villarreal before signing for the latter on a permanent contract in 2014; his career was marred by several knee injuries.

Asenjo was a Spain international, making a single appearance for the senior side in 2016. He previously represented the nation at various youth levels.

== Club career ==
=== Valladolid ===
Born in Palencia, Castile and León, Asenjo started his playing career in the academy of Real Valladolid and soon emerged as one of the most talented players in the club. Succeeding first-team goalkeepers Alberto and Ludovic Butelle, he was promoted to the senior side during the 2007–08 season, and kept a clean sheet in a 2–0 home win over Villarreal on 2 December 2007 which marked his La Liga debut. He conceded just once in his first five matches, which earned him a permanent starting berth and saw him rewarded with his first professional contract in January of the following year.

Asenjo retained his position, but saw 2008–09 be interrupted by a knee injury which ruled him out for a number of matches midway through the campaign. The injury, which sidelined him for a period of three months, was the first of a number of knee ailments which would later plague him during his career.

Asenjo returned to the pitch following his recovery, and ultimately made just short of 50 appearances for the Estadio José Zorrilla-based team before earning a move to Atlético Madrid.

=== Atlético Madrid ===
On 8 July 2009, Asenjo transferred to Atlético Madrid for a reported fee of €5 million and signed a four-year deal with the club. He started the season as first choice, but often alternated with compatriot David de Gea.

In May 2010, Asenjo suffered a ruptured anterior cruciate ligament and was ruled out for a further six months. Upon his return, he found his place in the squad uncertain and, in December of that year, he was loaned to Málaga until the end of the campaign, with teammate Ignacio Camacho also making the move in a permanent deal.

On 6 February 2011, during a league match between Málaga and Sevilla, Asenjo suffered a second ACL injury to his right knee when he turned awkwardly on the pitch surface. He missed the remainder of the season, having only made five league appearances during his loan spell.

Asenjo returned to Atlético for 2011–12 and 2012–13, but served featured primarily as back-up to Thibaut Courtois, who had arrived on loan from Chelsea as a replacement for the departed De Gea.

=== Villarreal ===
With his game time limited in Madrid, Asenjo agreed to a one-year loan deal with Villarreal in July 2013 with the club retaining a buyout option at the end of the season. He excelled during his first year, missing only three league matches and keeping nine clean sheets as the side qualified for the play-off round of the UEFA Europa League. The ensuing summer, he signed a permanent five-year contract.

Asenjo retained his starting spot throughout the 2014–15 campaign but, on 29 April 2015, in the dying minutes of a 1–0 loss to former side Atlético, he tore his ACL for a third time while attempting to make a save. After an excruciating rehabilitation process, he made his return to the squad on 23 February 2016 when he was named on the bench by Marcelino García Toral for the Europa League fixture against Italy's Napoli. The following month, and in the same competition, he played his first game in nearly 11 months and kept a clean sheet in a 0–0 draw (2–0 aggregate win) at Bayer Leverkusen.

Asenjo, who reclaimed his starting position following his recovery, signed a new contract in December 2016 to last until 2022. The following 26 February, during the first half of a league home match against Real Madrid, he suffered a ruptured anterior cruciate ligament for a fourth time, this time in his left knee– prior to the misfortune, he had conceded the fewest goals in the league and had kept 11 clean sheets. He spent nine months on the sidelines as a result of the injury, before making his return in November 2017 in a Copa del Rey encounter against Ponferradina.

In 2020–21, under new manager Unai Emery, Asenjo retained his place as a starter in the league season, while Gerónimo Rulli was preferred for the victorious Europa League campaign. He made one appearance on the European front, the last-16 second leg at home to Dynamo Kyiv which his team won 2–0 on 18 March.

=== Return to Valladolid ===
On 7 July 2022, Asenjo returned to Valladolid on a free transfer. He acted mainly as a backup to longtime incumbent Jordi Masip, and after being demoted to third-choice following the arrival of John, he left the club in September 2023.

Asenjo announced his retirement from professional football on 27 July 2024, aged 35.

== International career ==
In 2006, Asenjo was selected to the Spain under-17 side as they took home the bronze medal in the UEFA European Championship. He started in all of the matches, except the third-place play-off.

Asenjo was again called up for the 2007 Under-19 European Championship: in the qualification rounds his role in the team was quite insignificant, but his status changed in the semi-final against France, replacing the injured starter and saving two penalties in the shootout as the country progressed to the final, where he appeared against Greece with another excellent display for a 1–0 win.

Asenjo made his under-21 debut in late August 2008, and was first choice at the 2009 European Championships. He also played at the 2009 FIFA U-20 World Cup in Egypt.

In March 2015, Asenjo received his first ever callup to the senior national team, being named in Vicente del Bosque's squad for a UEFA Euro 2016 qualifier against Ukraine and a friendly with the Netherlands. He did not make his debut until 29 May the following year, in a 3–1 friendly victory over Bosnia and Herzegovina at the AFG Arena in St. Gallen, Switzerland; he was the first footballer from Palencia to win a cap since Jesús Landáburu 36 years prior.

== Career statistics ==
=== Club ===
Appearances and goals by club, season and competition
Club	Season	League			Copa del Rey		Europe		Other		Total	
Club	Season	Division	Apps	Goals	Apps	Goals	Apps	Goals	Apps	Goals	Apps	Goals
Valladolid B	2006–07	Segunda División B	29	0	—		—		1 (Note: Appearance in Segunda División B play-offs)	0	30	0
Valladolid B	2007–08	Segunda División B	10	0	—		—		—		10	0
Valladolid B	Total		39	0	—		—		1	0	40	0
Valladolid	2007–08	La Liga	24	0	0	0	—		—		24	0
Valladolid	2008–09	La Liga	23	0	0	0	—		—		23	0
Valladolid	Total		47	0	0	0	—		—		47	0
Atlético Madrid	2009–10	La Liga	15	0	2	0	9 (Note: Two appearances in UEFA Europa League, seven appearances in UEFA Champions League)	0	—		26	0
Atlético Madrid	2011–12	La Liga	2	0	2	0	1 (Note: Appearances in UEFA Europa League)	0	—		5	0
Atlético Madrid	2012–13	La Liga	1	0	1	0	8	0	0	0	10	0
Atlético Madrid	Total		18	0	5	0	18	0	0	0	41	0
Málaga (loan)	2010–11	La Liga	5	0	1	0	—		—		6	0
Villarreal (loan)	2013–14	La Liga	35	0	0	0	—		—		35	0
Villarreal	2014–15	La Liga	34	0	6	0	8	0	—		48	0
Villarreal	2015–16	La Liga	4	0	0	0	3	0	—		7	0
Villarreal	2016–17	La Liga	24	0	2	0	5 (Note: Three appearances in UEFA Europa League, two appearances in UEFA Champions League)	0	—		31	0
Villarreal	2017–18	La Liga	23	0	1	0	2	0	—		26	0
Villarreal	2018–19	La Liga	32	0	0	0	0	0	—		32	0
Villarreal	2019–20	La Liga	34	0	0	0	—		—		34	0
Villarreal	2020–21	La Liga	36	0	0	0	1	0	—		37	0
Villarreal	2021–22	La Liga	6	0	1	0	0	0	1 (Note: Appearance in UEFA Super Cup)	0	8	0
Villarreal	Villarreal total		228	0	10	0	19	0	1	0	258	0
Valladolid	2022–23	La Liga	10	0	2	0	—		—		12	0
Career total			347	0	18	0	37	0	2	0	404	0

=== International ===
Appearances and goals by national team and year
National team	Year	Apps	Goals
Spain	2016	1	0
Total		1	0

== Honours ==
Atlético Madrid

- Copa del Rey: 2012–13; runner-up 2009–10
- UEFA Europa League: 2009–10, 2011–12
- UEFA Super Cup: 2012

Villarreal

- UEFA Europa League: 2020–21
- UEFA Super Cup runner-up: 2021

Spain U17

- UEFA European Under-17 Championship third place: 2006

Spain U19

- UEFA European Under-19 Championship: 2007
