= Alfredo Pedraza =

Spanish footballer

Personal information
- Full name: Alfredo Pedraza Arias
- Date of birth: 20 December 2000 (age 25)
- Place of birth: Madrid, Spain
- Height: 1.85 m (6 ft 1 in)
- Position: Centre back

Team information
- Current team: Gimnástica de Torrelavega
- Number: 21

Youth career
- Atlético Madrid

Senior career*
Years	Team	Apps	(Gls)
2019–2020	Atlético Madrid B	0	(0)
2019–2020	→ La Nucía (loan)	19	(2)
2020–2021	Levante B	5	(0)
2021	Levante	0	(0)
2021	Ponferradina	1	(0)
2021–2022	SS Reyes	5	(0)
2022–2023	Unionistas	27	(1)
2023–2024	Badalona Futur	32	(0)
2024–2025	Sabadell	20	(1)
2025	Ninh Binh	0	(0)
2025–2026	Fuenlabrada	32	(1)
2026–	Gimnástica de Torrelavega		
- * Club domestic league appearances and goals as of 16 May 2026

Alfredo Pedraza Arias (born 20 December 2000) is a Spanish professional footballer who plays as a centre back for Segunda Federación club Gimnástica de Torrelavega.

== Club career ==
Pedraza was born in Madrid, and was an Atlético Madrid youth graduate. On 7 August 2019, after finishing his formation, he was loaned to Segunda División B side CF La Nucía for the season.

Pedraza made his senior debut on 25 August 2019, starting in a 1–0 home win against UE Cornellà. He scored his first goal on 29 September, netting the winner in a 2–1 home success over UE Olot.

On 1 July 2020, Pedraza signed a two-year contract with Levante UD, being assigned to the reserves also in the third division. He made his first team debut the following 6 January, starting in a 2–1 away win against Club Portugalete, for the season's Copa del Rey.

On 1 February 2021, Pedraza joined Segunda División side SD Ponferradina. He made his professional debut on 18 May, coming on as a second-half substitute for Iván Rodríguez in a 1–4 home loss against RCD Espanyol.

On 27 August 2021, Pedraza moved to UD San Sebastián de los Reyes in Primera División RFEF.

On 1 July 2025, Pedraza moved to Vietnam, signing for in V.League 1 club Ninh Binh on a free transfer. He departed from the team before the start of the season.
