= Francis Coquelin =

French footballer (born 1991)

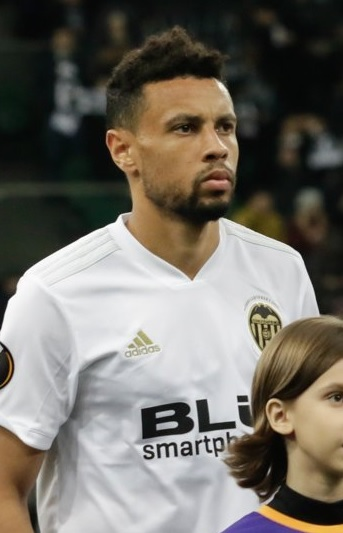
- Coquelin with Valencia in 2019

Personal information
- Full name: Francis Joseph Coquelin
- Date of birth: 13 May 1991 (age 35)
- Place of birth: Laval, France
- Height: 1.76 m (5 ft 9 in)
- Position: Defensive midfielder

Team information
- Current team: Laval
- Number: 13

Youth career
- 2000–2005: AS Bourny Laval
- 2005–2008: Laval
- 2008–2009: Arsenal

Senior career*
Years	Team	Apps	(Gls)
2008–2018	Arsenal	105	(0)
2010–2011	→ Lorient (loan)	24	(1)
2013–2014	→ SC Freiburg (loan)	16	(0)
2014	→ Charlton Athletic (loan)	5	(0)
2018–2020	Valencia	61	(1)
2020–2024	Villarreal	75	(3)
2025–2026	Nantes	22	(1)
2026–	Laval	0	(0)

International career
2009–2010	France U19	16	(0)
2010–2011	France U20	12	(0)
2011–2012	France U21	7	(0)
Medal record
Representing France
UEFA European Under-19 Championship
Winner	2010
- * Club domestic league appearances and goals as of 2 May 2026 (UTC)

Francis Joseph Coquelin (French pronunciation: [fʁɑ̃sis kɔklɛ̃]; born 13 May 1991) is a French professional footballer who plays as a defensive midfielder for Ligue 2 club Laval. He has also featured for Valencia, Arsenal, Lorient, SC Freiburg, Charlton Athletic and Villarreal in his career.

== Club career ==
Coquelin was born in Laval, Mayenne from parents originating from Réunion and has Malagasy roots. He began his career playing for AS Bourny Laval before departing in 2005 for the biggest club in the commune, Stade Lavallois. Coquelin spent three years at the club before being spotted by renowned Arsenal scout Gilles Grimandi, while on international duty, playing in a 2008 UEFA European Under-17 Championship elite round qualification match against Israel.

=== Arsenal ===
==== Early career ====
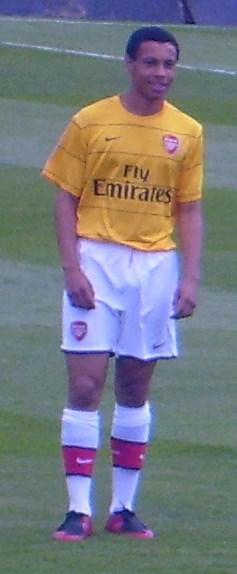
Coquelin playing for Arsenal in a pre-season friendly against Barnet in 2008.

On 22 July 2008, Coquelin joined Arsenal from Stade Lavallois following a successful trial with the club. Although he suffered a thigh injury which cut the trial short, Coquelin impressed and was subsequently offered a deal to stay in North London.

Coquelin played for the first team in Arsenal's pre-season matches against Barnet and Szombathelyi Haladás in the summer of 2008, and made his competitive first team debut for Arsenal in a 6–0 win over Sheffield United on 23 September 2008, coming on as a substitute for Fran Mérida to play at right back. Coquelin scored his first goal in an Arsenal shirt in a reserve match against Stoke City on 6 October 2008, shooting powerfully in from the edge of the box with his weaker left foot.

He was a regular for Arsenal's reserves during the 2009–10 season, playing 12 times and scoring twice. On 22 September 2009, he made his first start for the first team against West Bromwich Albion in the League Cup third round, playing 58 minutes before he was replaced by Mark Randall. He featured again in the League Cup, this time as a second-half substitute for Fran Mérida in the 2–1 victory against Liverpool. Coquelin made a disappointing first FA Cup start in a 3–1 loss to Stoke City. Playing in an unfamiliar right-back position, he was substituted in the second half for Aaron Ramsey.

==== Lorient (loan) ====
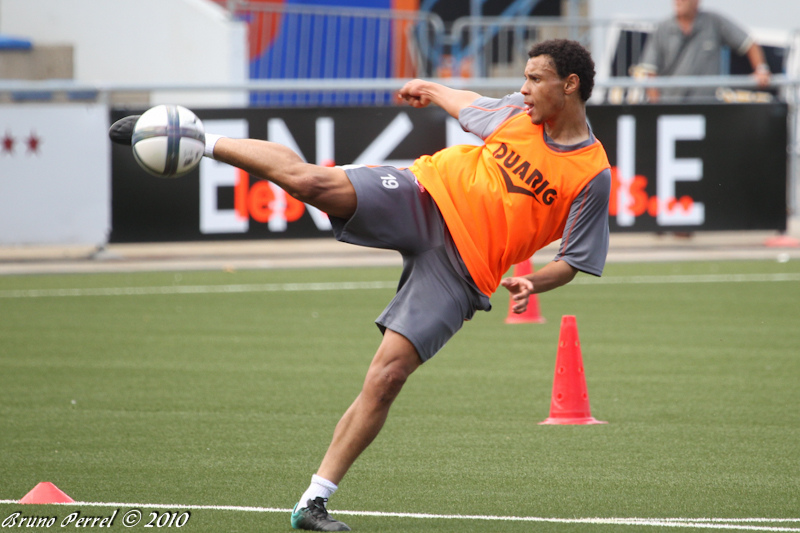
Coquelin in training for Lorient.

Coquelin opted for a move to Lorient on a loan deal that saw him play his football in France throughout the 2010–11 season. He made his Lorient debut as a second-half substitute in the 2–1 home defeat to Nice on 14 August 2010. Coquelin grabbed his first assist as Lorient lost 6–3 to Lille. After beating one Lille player, he played a through-ball for Kevin Gameiro for Lorient's opener. Coquelin received his first red card while playing at right back against Valenciennes. He received the second yellow card after a handball decision. Coquelin scored his first goal in professional football as Lorient beat Rennes 2–1; he scored the winner from close range after Rennes goalkeeper Nicolas Douchez had spilled a Morgan Amalfitano long-range effort. In the latter stages of the season, Coquelin was heavily used on the right hand side of midfield. He completed his loan with Lorient making 24 appearances in Ligue 1, one appearance in the Coupe de France and scoring one goal. Sky Sports reported that Lorient manager Christian Gourcuff was keen to re-sign Coquelin as well as his Arsenal teammate Gilles Sunu on an additional year's loan.

==== Return to Arsenal ====
After spending pre-season at the 2011 FIFA U-20 World Cup with France, Coquelin returned to Arsenal, and on 28 August 2011, he made his first team league debut against Manchester United. He played 62 minutes in the 8–2 defeat before being substituted for Alex Oxlade-Chamberlain. Coquelin made his second Premier League start for Arsenal in the North London derby against Tottenham Hotspur. Despite Arsenal losing the match 2–1, Coquelin was voted as Arsenal.com's Man of the Match by fans for the first time. On 6 December 2011, he made his UEFA Champions League debut for Arsenal in the 3–1 away defeat to Olympiacos, playing 67 minutes before being substituted for Tomáš Rosický. On 10 January 2012, he signed a new long-term contract at Arsenal. The Frenchman had been rewarded with a new deal after demonstrating his versatility with a string of fine performances in both holding midfield and defence. Coquelin got his first assist for Arsenal in the 7–1 victory over Blackburn Rovers; his low cross to the front post was converted by Robin van Persie.

At the start of the 2012–13 season, Coquelin received a new squad number, moving from 39 to 22. He made his first start of the season in the 6–1 home win against Southampton, playing 67 minutes before being replaced by Aaron Ramsey. Coquelin provided his first assist of the season in the 6–1 victory over Coventry City in the League Cup; his sliding flick on for Olivier Giroud allowed his compatriot to score his first goal for the club. On 25 October 2012, Coquelin was again awarded Arsenal.com's Man of the Match for his performance in the 2–0 home loss against Schalke 04.

==== Freiburg (loan) ====
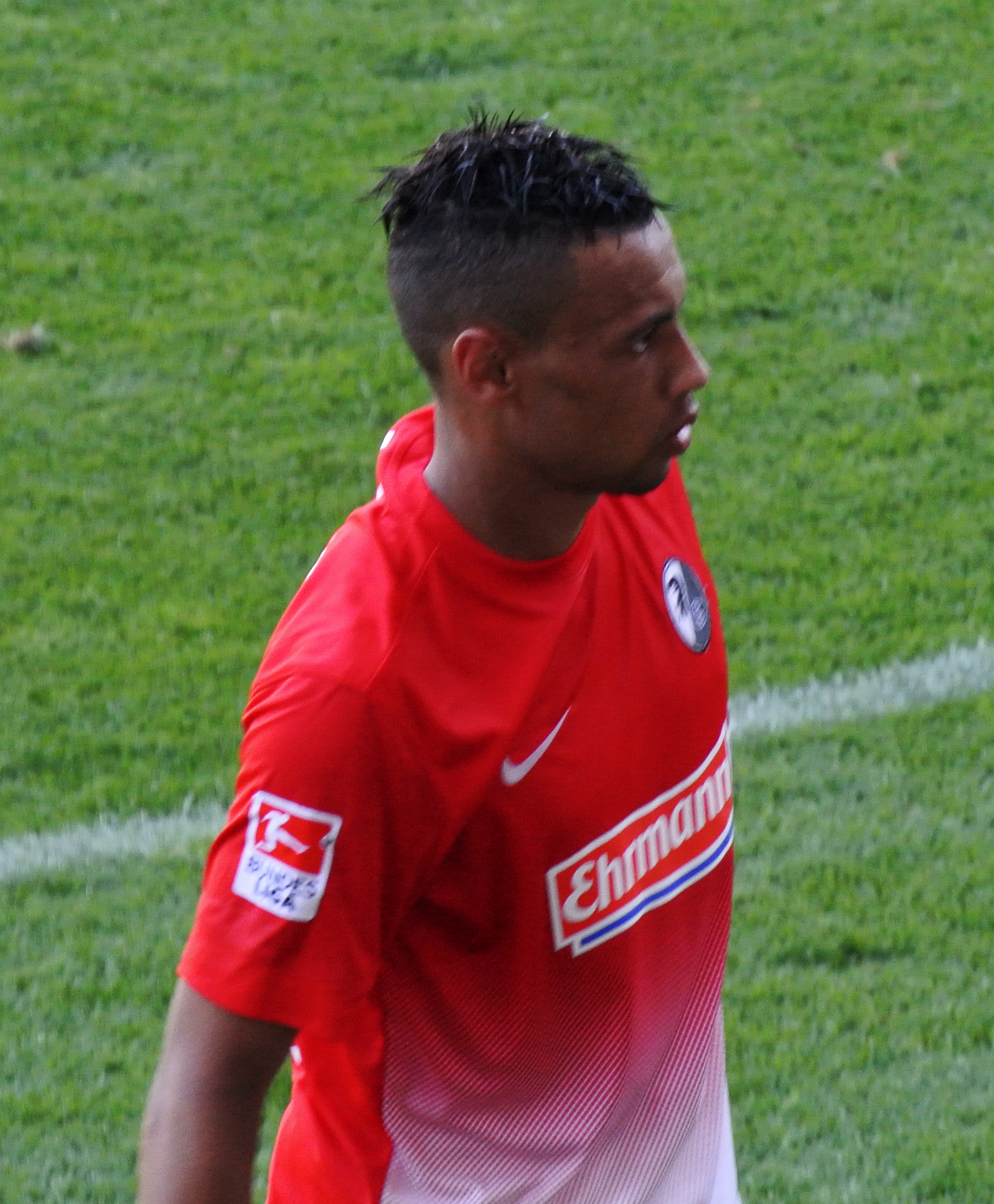
Coquelin with SC Freiburg in 2013

On 5 July 2013, Arsenal announced that Coquelin would be loaned to SC Freiburg for the 2013–14 season. He was played out of position on the left wing during most of his time in Germany, which he admitted he found "tough". He does however credit his season loan there as being beneficial to his development as a player, and in November 2013 scored his first goal at first-team level in a 2–1 win over Slovan Liberec in the UEFA Europa League.

==== 2014–15 season ====
Without taking part in any matches for Arsenal during the first three months of season 2014–15, Coquelin joined Championship side Charlton Athletic on 3 November 2014 for a month's loan. He made his debut a day later coming off the bench in Charlton's 2–2 away draw with Leeds United at Elland Road. Coquelin's loan deal was originally extended through the end of December 2014, but on 12 December, the media reported that Coquelin had been recalled early due to an injury crisis at Arsenal.

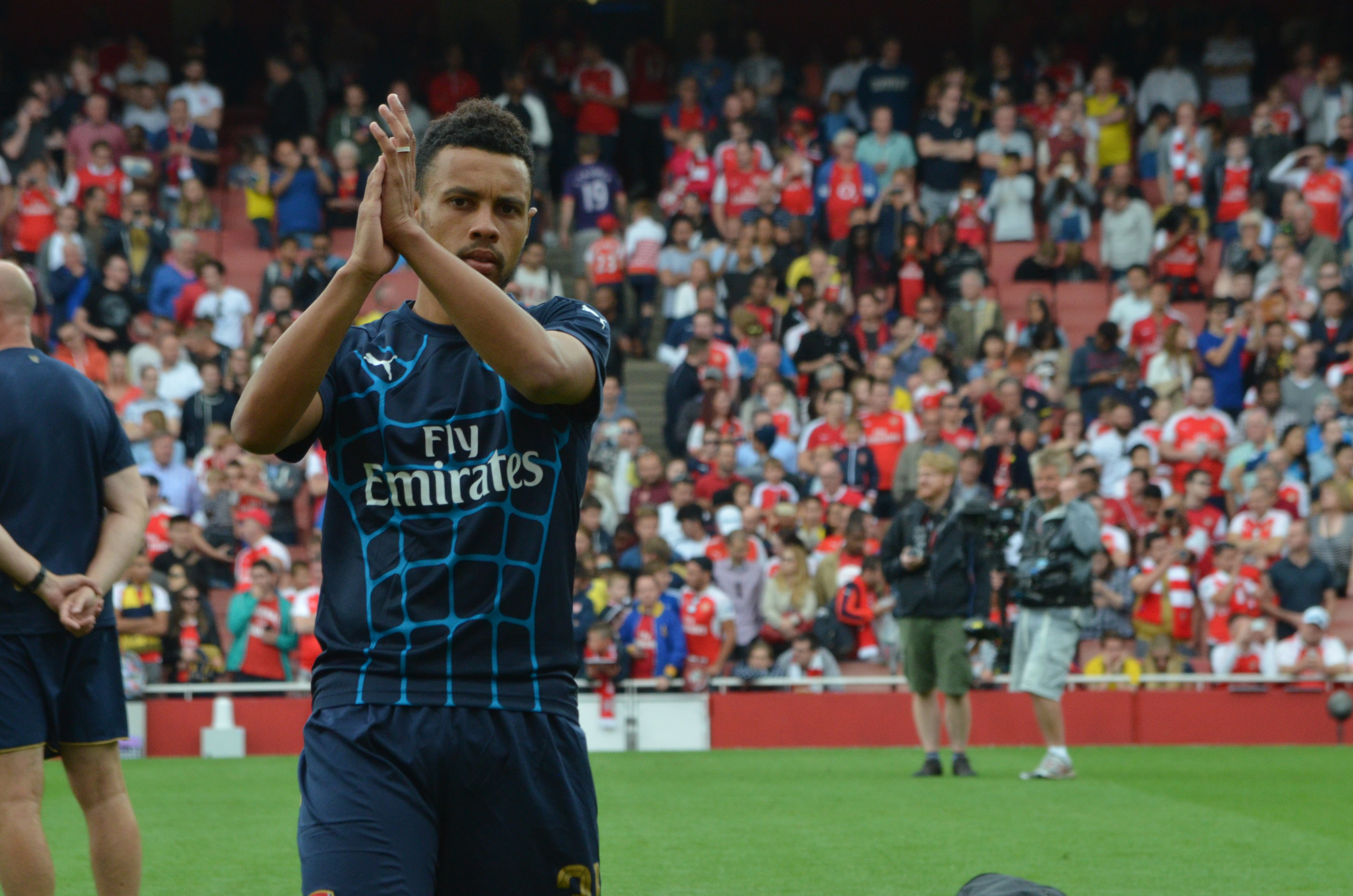
Coquelin warming-up for Arsenal in 2015

Having been recalled from his loan at Charlton to cover for injuries, Coquelin made a late substitute appearance in the team's 4–1 league victory against Newcastle United on 13 December 2014. After further substitute appearances in the team's next two matches against Liverpool and Queens Park Rangers, Coquelin was selected to start a Premier League match for the first time in 23 months as Arsenal beat West Ham United at the Boleyn Ground on 28 December. After this, Coquelin retained his place in the Arsenal team and performed impressively as the Gunners defeated champions Manchester City 2–0 at the Etihad Stadium on 18 January 2015. In his Press Conference on 22 January 2015, Arsenal manager Arsène Wenger spoke of Coquelin's loan to Charlton, saying, "I saw that he made huge improvements in training so I sent him on loan for match practice." On 1 March, during the win against Everton, Coquelin broke his nose in a collision with teammate Olivier Giroud after a strong home performance as a midfield pivot to Santi Cazorla. Coquelin wore a protective mask and produced a resolute performance in the heart of midfield again against Queens Park Rangers on 4 March 2015.

Coquelin was a revelation on his return from loan at Charlton, establishing himself as one of the top defensive players in the Premier League. Since his first start of the season for Arsenal against West Ham United in December 2014, he went on to lead the league in defensive interceptions made and "compare[d] favourably with defensive midfielders at the top clubs in the Premier League and Champions League". Arsène Wenger publicly displayed his shock of the sudden impact Coquelin brought since returning from loan, being quoted in The Guardian saying that Coquelin could be a "long-term solution."

On 30 May, Coquelin was selected to start in the 2015 FA Cup Final, playing the full 90 minutes in a 4–0 victory over Aston Villa at Wembley Stadium.

==== 2015–16 season ====
He played in the season's opening match, the 2015 FA Community Shield against Chelsea, which Arsenal won 1–0. Coquelin missed two matches in September against Leicester City and Tottenham with a minor injury, and was dropped for a League Cup defeat to Sheffield Wednesday in October. Despite the three missed matches, Coquelin played in every other Arsenal match since the season begun, but his season was halted by a knee ligament injury sustained in a 2–1 defeat to West Brom that ruled him out for three months.

Coquelin returned to training in mid-January 2016, and made his return to the first team on 30 January, playing from the start in Arsenal's 2–1 win over Burnley in the fourth round of the FA Cup.

==== 2016–17 season ====
On 12 January 2017, Coquelin signed a new long-term contract with Arsenal.

=== Valencia ===
On 11 January 2018, Coquelin signed a contract with Spanish La Liga club Valencia for a reported fee of €14 million. He scored the third goal of his career and his first for Valencia on 17 February the same year, against Malaga in the 80th minute from a corner.

=== Villarreal ===
On 12 August 2020, Coquelin signed for fellow Spanish club Villarreal, for a reported €13 million, on a four-year deal.

=== Nantes ===
On 31 January 2025, Coquelin joined Ligue 1 club Nantes, signing a contract until the end of the season. He made his debut for the club coming on as a substitute in a 3–1 home win over Lens, providing an assist in the league for the first time in over 13 years. On 17 May 2025, he netted his first goal for the club in a 3–0 victory over Montpellier.

=== Laval ===
On 6 July 2026, Coquelin returned to his childhood club Laval in Ligue 2.

== International career ==
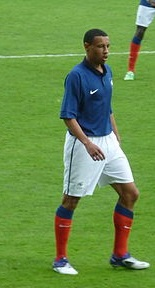
Coquelin whilst featuring for France U21s

Coquelin is a France youth international having earned caps for the under-17s, under-18s, under-19s, under-20s and under-21s. Coquelin played a key role in France winning the 2010 UEFA European Under-19 Championship, starting four of France's five matches. In the semi-final against Croatia, Coquelin skipped past three challenges and slipped a pass through for Cédric Bakambu to score the winning goal and put France into the final.

Coquelin, as well as former Arsenal teammate Gilles Sunu, were named in France under-20s' final 21-man squad that competed at the 2011 FIFA U-20 World Cup. Coquelin started and completed all seven of France's world cup matches, as France finished fourth in Colombia.

Coquelin received his first red card at the under-21 level in the 2–1 defeat to Slovakia; he was shown a straight red card after a challenge on Filip Kiss.

== Career statistics ==
As of match played 2 May 2026

Appearances and goals by club, season and competition
Club	Season	League			National cup (Note: Includes FA Cup, Coupe de France, DFB-Pokal, Copa del Rey)		League cup (Note: Includes Football League Cup)		Europe		Other		Total	
Club	Season	Division	Apps	Goals	Apps	Goals	Apps	Goals	Apps	Goals	Apps	Goals	Apps	Goals
Arsenal	2008–09	Premier League	0	0	0	0	1	0	0	0	—		1	0
Arsenal	2009–10	Premier League	0	0	1	0	2	0	0	0	—		3	0
Arsenal	2011–12	Premier League	10	0	3	0	3	0	1 (Note: Appearance(s) in UEFA Champions League)	0	—		17	0
Arsenal	2012–13	Premier League	11	0	2	0	3	0	6	0	—		22	0
Arsenal	2014–15	Premier League	22	0	5	0	1	0	2	0	0	0	30	0
Arsenal	2015–16	Premier League	26	0	2	0	0	0	6	0	1 (Note: Appearance in FA Community Shield)	0	35	0
Arsenal	2016–17	Premier League	29	0	3	0	1	0	6	0	—		39	0
Arsenal	2017–18	Premier League	7	0	0	0	2	0	4 (Note: Appearances in UEFA Europa League)	0	0	0	13	0
Arsenal	Total		105	0	16	0	13	0	25	0	1	0	160	0
Lorient (loan)	2010–11	Ligue 1	24	1	1	0	0	0	—		—		25	1
SC Freiburg (loan)	2013–14	Bundesliga	16	0	3	0	—		5	1	—		24	1
Charlton Athletic (loan)	2014–15	Championship	5	0	—		—		—		—		5	0
Valencia	2017–18	La Liga	9	1	2	0	—		—		—		11	1
Valencia	2018–19	La Liga	26	0	5	0	—		11 (Note: Four appearances in UEFA Champions League, seven appearances in UEFA Europa League)	0	—		42	0
Valencia	2019–20	La Liga	26	0	3	0	—		6	0	1 (Note: Appearance in Supercopa de España)	0	36	0
Valencia	Total		61	1	10	0	—		17	0	1	0	89	1
Villarreal	2020–21	La Liga	22	0	3	0	—		7	0	—		32	0
Villarreal	2021–22	La Liga	20	2	0	0	—		8	1	0	0	28	3
Villarreal	2022–23	La Liga	16	1	2	1	—		7 (Note: Appearances in UEFA Europa Conference League)	1	—		25	3
Villarreal	2023–24	La Liga	17	0	1	0	—		4	0	—		22	0
Villarreal	Total		75	3	6	1	—		26	2	0	0	107	6
Nantes	2024–25	Ligue 1	6	1	—		—		—		—		6	1
Nantes	2025–26	Ligue 1	16	0	1	0	—		—		—		17	0
Nantes	Total		22	1	1	0	—		—		—		23	1
Career total			308	6	37	1	13	0	73	3	2	0	433	10

== Honours ==
Arsenal Youth

- FA Youth Cup: 2008–09

Arsenal

- FA Cup: 2014–15, 2016–17
- FA Community Shield: 2015

Valencia

- Copa del Rey: 2018–19

Villarreal

- UEFA Europa League: 2020–21

France U19

- UEFA European Under-19 Championship: 2010
