= Xavi Quintillà =

Spanish footballer (born 1996)

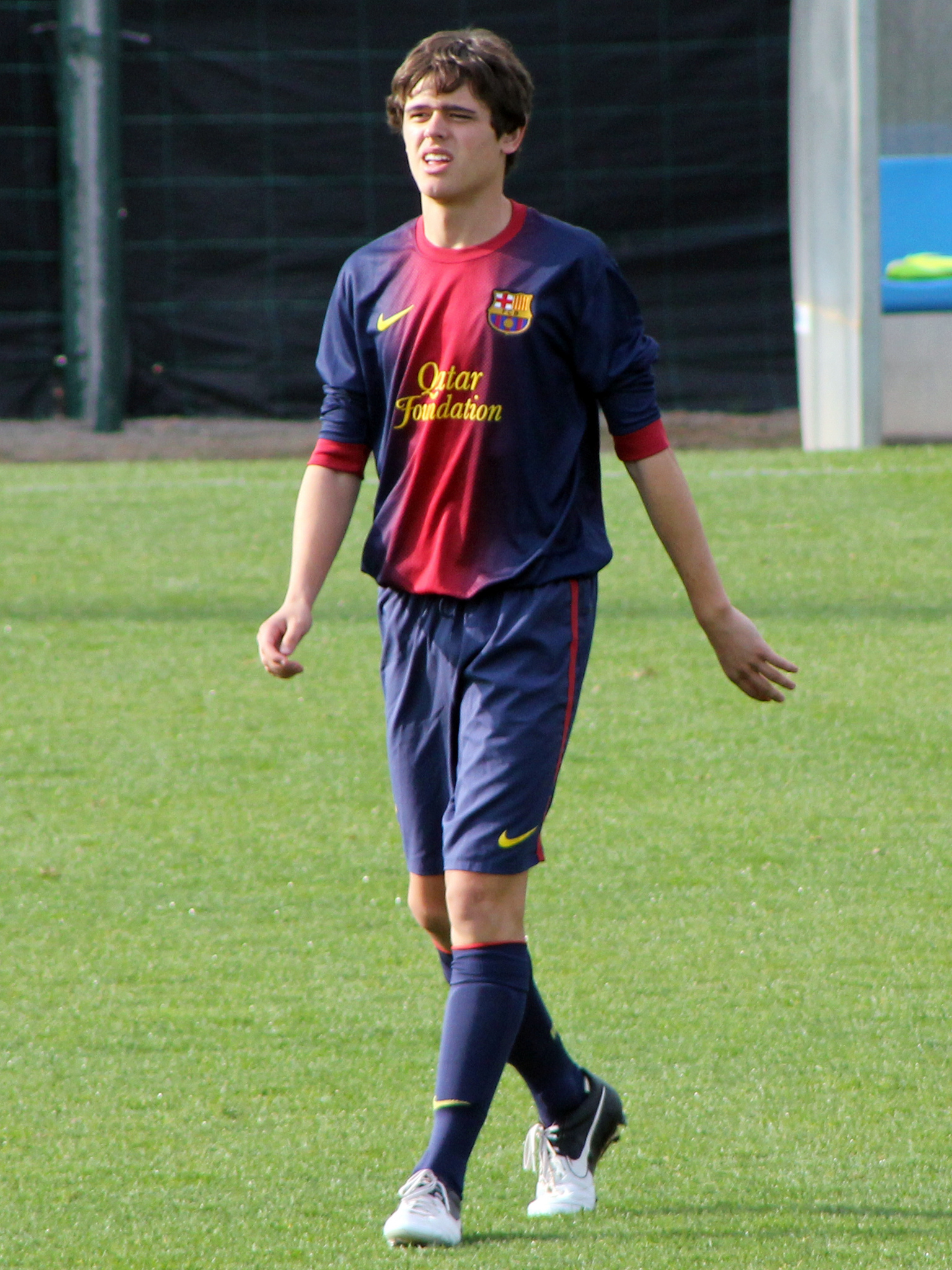
- Quintillà playing for Barcelona in 2012

Personal information
- Full name: Xavier Quintillà Guasch
- Date of birth: 23 August 1996 (age 30)
- Place of birth: Lleida, Spain
- Height: 1.77 m (5 ft 10 in)
- Position: Left-back

Youth career
- 2002–2009: Lleida
- 2009–2015: Barcelona

Senior career*
Years	Team	Apps	(Gls)
2015–2017	Barcelona B	8	(0)
2016–2017	→ Lleida Esportiu (loan)	29	(0)
2017–2019	Villarreal B	52	(4)
2018–2022	Villarreal	26	(0)
2020–2021	→ Norwich City (loan)	11	(2)
2021–2022	→ Leganés (loan)	15	(1)
2022–2023	Santa Clara	13	(1)
2023–2024	Alcorcón	22	(0)
2024–2025	APOEL	20	(3)
2025–2026	Krasava ENY Ypsonas	0	(0)

International career
2012	Spain U16	3	(0)
2012–2013	Spain U17	6	(0)
2014	Spain U18	2	(0)
2013–2015	Spain U19	5	(0)
- * Club domestic league appearances and goals as of 14 June 2026

Xavier "Xavi" Quintillà Guasch (born 23 August 1996) is a Spanish professional footballer who plays as a left-back.

== Club career ==
=== Barcelona ===
Born in Lleida, Catalonia, Quintillà joined FC Barcelona's youth setup in 2009, from hometown UE Lleida. After finishing his graduation, he was promoted to the reserves in July 2015, after the club's relegation to Segunda División B.

Quintillà made his senior debut on 22 August 2015, starting in a 2–1 loss at UE Cornellà. On 26 August of the following year, after contributing with only eight league appearances, he was loaned to fellow third division side Lleida Esportiu for the campaign.

On 1 September 2017, Quintillà terminated his contract with Barça.

=== Villarreal ===
On 1 September 2017, just hours after leaving Barcelona, Quintillà joined Villarreal CF and was initially assigned to the B-team. On 1 November of the following year, he made his first-team debut by starting in a 3–3 away draw against UD Almería, for the season's Copa del Rey. On 30 March 2019 he made his La Liga debut, playing all but the final two minutes of a 3–2 loss at RC Celta de Vigo.

Promoted to the main squad for the 2019–20 season, Quintillà featured sparingly but still renewed his contract until 2023 on 25 February 2020.

On 18 August 2020, Quintillà joined EFL Championship side Norwich City on loan. He scored his first goal in a 3–1 win against Queens Park Rangers the following 24 April, and ended his spell at Carrow Road as a title winner.

Quintillà joined Segunda División side Leganés on a season-long loan deal on 10 July 2021, with an option to buy. He played just over a third of the games in a mid-table finish, scoring once to equalise in a 1–1 home draw with SD Ponferradina on 12 December.

=== Santa Clara ===
On 4 July 2022, free agent Quintillà signed for two years at C.D. Santa Clara of the Portuguese Primeira Liga.

=== Alcorcón ===
On 11 August 2023, Quintillà returned to Spain and its second division, after signing for AD Alcorcón.

=== APOEL ===
On 5 June 2024, free agent Quintillà signed for one year at APOEL. APOEL FC of the Stoiximan Cyprus League.

== Personal life ==
Quintillà's older brother, Jordi, is also a footballer, who plays as a midfielder. Both were at Barcelona together.

== Career statistics ==
As of match played 8 July 2024

Appearances and goals by club, season and competition
Club	Season	League			National cup		League cup		Other		Total	
Club	Season	Division	Apps	Goals	Apps	Goals	Apps	Goals	Apps	Goals	Apps	Goals
Barcelona B	2015–16	Segunda División B	8	0	—		—		—		8	0
Lleida Esportiu (loan)	2016–17	Segunda División B	29	0	2	0	—		—		31	0
Villarreal B	2017–18	Segunda División B	30	1	—		—		—		30	1
Villarreal B	2018–19	Segunda División B	22	3	—		—		—		22	3
Villarreal B	Total		52	4	—		—		—		52	4
Villarreal	2018–19	La Liga	7	0	1	0	—		1 (Note: Appearances in UEFA Europa League)	0	9	0
Villarreal	2019–20	La Liga	19	0	4	0	—		—		23	0
Villarreal	Total		26	0	5	0	—		1	0	32	0
Norwich City (loan)	2020–21	Championship	11	2	1	0	—		—		12	2
Leganés (loan)	2021–22	Segunda División	15	1	3	0	—		—		18	1
Santa Clara	2022–23	Primeira Liga	13	1	0	0	4	0	—		17	1
Alcorcón	2023–24	Segunda División	22	0	2	0	—		—		24	0
Career total			176	8	13	0	4	0	1	0	196	8

== Honours ==
Barcelona

- UEFA Youth League: 2013–14

Norwich City

- EFL Championship: 2020–21
