= Fermín López =

Spanish footballer (born 2003)

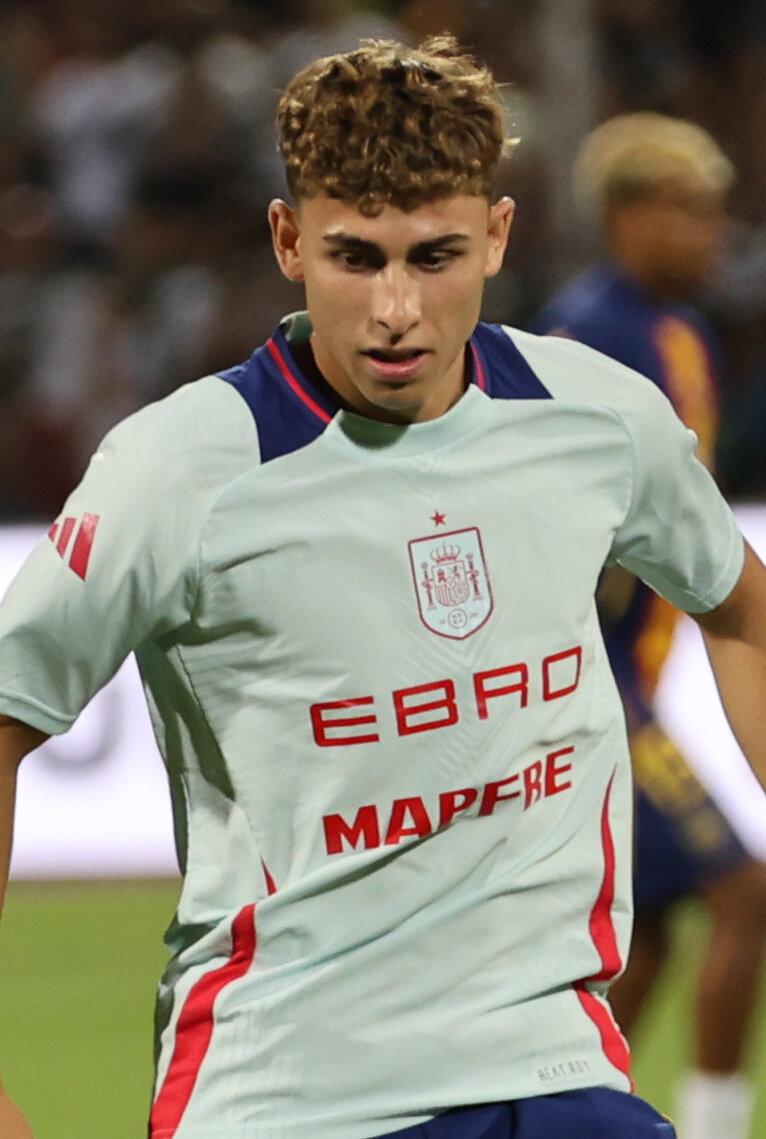
- López playing for Spain in 2025

Personal information
- Full name: Fermín López Marín
- Date of birth: 11 May 2003 (age 23)
- Place of birth: El Campillo, Spain
- Height: 1.76 m (5 ft 9 in)
- Positions: Attacking midfielder; winger

Team information
- Current team: Barcelona
- Number: 7

Youth career
- 2010–2011: El Campillo
- 2011–2012: Recreativo
- 2012–2016: Betis
- 2016–2022: Barcelona

Senior career*
Years	Team	Apps	(Gls)
2022–2023	Barcelona B	1	(0)
2022–2023	→ Linares (loan)	37	(12)
2023–	Barcelona	101	(28)

International career^{‡}
2023–2025	Spain U21	7	(1)
2024	Spain U23	6	(6)
2024–	Spain	12	(0)
Medal record
Men's football
Representing Spain
Olympic Games
Gold medal – first place	2024 Paris	Team
UEFA European Championship
Winner	2024 Germany	Team
UEFA Nations League
Runner-up	2025 Germany	Team
- * Club domestic league appearances and goals as of 21:10, 22 November 2026 (UTC) ‡ National team caps and goals as of 15 November 2026

Fermín López Marín (born 11 May 2003), also known simply as Fermín, is a Spanish professional footballer who plays as an attacking midfielder or winger for La Liga club Barcelona and the Spain national team.

== Club career ==
=== Early career ===
Born in El Campillo, Huelva, Andalusia, López began playing football with his local club El Campillo, and followed that with a stint at Recreativo before moving to Real Betis in 2012. In the summer of 2016, he moved to the youth academy of Barcelona.

=== Barcelona ===
==== 2022–23: Loan to Linares ====
On 19 August 2022, López signed a professional contract with Barcelona Atlètic for two years until 2024, and immediately went on loan with Linares in the Primera Federación for the 2022–23 season. He made his senior debut nine days later, starting in a 2–0 home win over Mérida.

López scored his first senior goal on 30 October 2022, in a 2–1 away win over Rayo Majadahonda. He finished the campaign with 12 goals in 40 appearances overall, being an undisputed starter for Linares.

==== 2023–24: First team debut ====
After strong performances in training with Barcelona before the preseason, López was called up to their senior pre-season squad in July 2023. He received international recognition after a strong performance for Barcelona, as he scored a goal and provided an assist in a friendly 3–0 win over their rivals Real Madrid on 29 July 2023. After the game, manager Xavi confirmed that López was to stay with their senior side for the 2023–24 season.

On 27 August, López made his La Liga debut for Barcelona in a 4–3 away win over Villarreal. Two days later, he signed a new contract at the club until 30 June 2027, with a buyout clause of €400 million. The following 10 September, he made his official debut with Barça Atlètic after receiving Xavi's permission to play for them. He was sent off after receiving a second yellow card in a 1–0 away loss to Gimnàstic de Tarragona. López would later return to the first team setup and made his UEFA Champions League debut on 19 September, coming off the bench to replace Gavi in the 58th minute of a 5–0 home victory over Royal Antwerp in the competition's group stage. A week later, in an away match against Mallorca, he scored his first goal for Barcelona and first La Liga goal: after coming on as a substitute on the 64th minute, with Barça losing 2–1, he scored a 75th-minute equalizer, setting the final score at 2–2.

On 25 October 2023, López scored a goal on his first start in the Champions League in a 2–1 victory over Shakhtar Donetsk, in which he was also named player of the match.

==== 2024–Present: Contract extension and domestic treble ====
On 31 October 2024, López extended his contract with Barcelona until 2029. On 15 May 2025, he netted a goal in a 2–0 away win over Espanyol, securing his team's La Liga title. Having already won the Copa del Rey and Supercopa de España, he capped off a historic domestic treble with his club.

On 21 October, López netted his first career hat-trick in a 6–1 victory over Olympiacos in the Champions League, becoming the first Spanish player to do so for the club since Pichi Alonso in 1986. In January 2026, he signed a contract extension with Barcelona until 2031. He enjoyed the most productive season of his career, recording 13 goals and 17 assists in all competitions.

== International career ==
On 6 October 2023, López was called up to the Spain under-21 squad; he later made his debut on 13 October in a 0–0 draw against the Uzbekistan under-23 team. He then went on to score his first goal for the team in a 4–0 away win over Kazakhstan in a qualifying match for the 2025 UEFA European Under-21 Championship on 17 October.

On 27 May 2024, López was selected in the Spanish senior 29-man preliminary squad for the UEFA Euro 2024. On 5 June, he debuted in a 5–0 friendly victory against Andorra at the Estadio Nuevo Vivero in Badajoz, coming on as a substitute to Barcelona teammate Pedri in the 62nd minute and assisting on the last goal of the game by another Barcelona player Ferran Torres. Shortly after, Spain won Euro 2024 with López being a largely unused substitute.

In July, he was selected in the Spain under-23 squad for the 2024 Summer Olympics. He and Spain would go on to win the Olympic gold medal at the men's football event in the Olympics. López scored 6 goals (including two against France in the final) and became second best goalscorer of the tournament (only behind Soufiane Rahimi). He along with his teammate Álex Baena became only the second and third players ever to win the UEFA European Championship and the Summer Olympic gold medal in the same year, after the French goalkeeper Albert Rust.

López suffered a foot fracture right before the 2026 FIFA World Cup that ruled him out of Spanish squad.

== Style of play ==
Fermín is an ambipedal central midfielder, with the versatility to play as an attacking midfielder. He has been described as technically proficient with great movement off the ball, adept at exploiting space, and productive with goals and assists. He is known for his powerful long-range shots, close control and high work-rate.

== Career statistics ==
=== Club ===
As of match played 22 November 2026

Appearances and goals by club, season and competition
Club	Season	League			Copa del Rey		Europe		Other		Total	
Club	Season	Division	Apps	Goals	Apps	Goals	Apps	Goals	Apps	Goals	Apps	Goals
Linares (loan)	2022–23	Primera Federación	37	12	3	0	—		—		40	12
Barcelona Atlètic	2023–24	Primera Federación	1	0	—		—		—		1	0
Barcelona	2023–24	La Liga	31	8	2	1	8 (Note: Appearances in UEFA Champions League)	2	1 (Note: Appearance(s) in Supercopa de España)	0	42	11
Barcelona	2024–25	La Liga	28	6	6	1	11	1	1	0	46	8
Barcelona	2025–26	La Liga	30	6	5	0	11	6	2	1	48	13
Barcelona	2026–27	La Liga	12	8	0	0	4	1	0	0	16	9
Barcelona	Total		101	28	13	2	34	10	4	1	152	41
Career total			139	39	16	2	34	10	4	1	193	53

=== International ===
As of match played 15 November 2026

Appearances and goals by national team and year
National team	Year	Apps	Goals
Spain	2024	2	0
Spain	2025	3	0
Spain	2026	7	0
Total		12	0

== Honours ==
Barcelona

- La Liga: 2024–25, 2025–26
- Copa del Rey: 2024–25
- Supercopa de España: 2025, 2026

Spain U23

- Olympic Gold Medal: 2024

Spain

- UEFA European Championship: 2024
- UEFA Nations League runner-up: 2024–25

=== Individual ===
La Liga Team of the Season: 2025–26
