= Spain national under-23 football team =

Spain national football team

Spain Olympic
- Nickname: La Roja (The Red One)
- Association: Real Federación Española de Fútbol (RFEF)
- Confederation: UEFA (Europe)
- Most caps: Luis Enrique (14)
- Top scorer: Kiko (7)
- FIFA code: ESP
First colours	Second colours

First international
- Spain 5–0 Luxembourg (Barcelona, Spain; 29 January 1967)

Biggest win
- Spain 5–0 Libya (El Ejido, Spain; 1 July 2005)

Biggest defeat
- Argentina 4–0 Spain (Birmingham, United States; 27 July 1996) Records for competitive matches only.

Olympic Games
- Appearances: 6 (first in 1992)
- Best result: Gold medalists (1992, 2024)

Mediterranean Games
- Appearances: 4 (first in 1997)
- Best result: Gold medalists (2005, 2009, 2018)
Medal record
Olympic Games
Gold medal – first place	1992 Barcelona	Team
Gold medal – first place	2024 Paris	Team
Silver medal – second place	1920 Amberes	Team
Silver medal – second place	2000 Sydney	Team
Silver medal – second place	2020 Tokyo	Team
Mediterranean Games
Gold medal – first place	2005 Almería	Team
Gold medal – first place	2009 Pescara	Team
Gold medal – first place	2018 Tarragona	Team
Silver medal – second place	1955 Barcelona	Team
Bronze medal – third place	1963 Naples	Team
Bronze medal – third place	1967 Tunis	Team

The Spain Olympic football team (also known as Spain Under-23, or Spain U-23) represents Spain in international football competitions in the Olympic Games. The selection is limited to players under the age of 23, except for the Olympics which allows the men's team up to three overage players. The team is controlled by the Royal Spanish Football Federation. Having qualified for six Olympic competitions since 1992, Spain has won two gold medals (1992 and 2024) and two silver medals (2000 and 2020).

== History ==
=== 1920–1988 Summer Olympics ===
Unlike later tournaments, the Summer Olympics used to be represented by senior or amateur teams. Spain's first participation in the Olympics was in Antwerp, Belgium, in 1920. Fourteen teams entered the competition which was organized on a knockout basis. Twelve teams entered the first round, with the six winners joining the host nation (Belgium) and France, in the quarter-finals. Czechoslovakia, participating in their first international tournament, cruised to the final, inflicting heavy defeats on Yugoslavia (who played their first ever international match in the competition), Norway, and France. Belgium beat a talented Spain and then the Netherlands on their way to the final. Belgium won the gold medal by default after Czechoslovakia walked off in protest during the final, unhappy with the performance of the English referee, John Lewis. The Bergvall System was used to determine second and third places. The beaten quarter-finalists played-off, Spain emerged triumphant overcoming Sweden 2–1 and Italy 2–0. Ordinarily, Spain would then have played the beaten finalists, but Czechoslovakia had been disqualified from the tournament. Spain thus advanced straight to the silver medal match against Holland, beaten in the semi-finals by gold medallists Belgium. Spain won 3–1.

1924 was not as successful, Spain bowed out of competition in the first round after losing to Italy 1–0.

At the 1928 Summer Olympics things would go from good to worse. Spain were, potentially, much to be feared. Defeated once since the last Olympic Games tournament their traditional tournament nerves would handicap them here, a key note that would strike throughout the coming years. The unavoidable loss of their experienced captain Pedro Vallana after their first game, though, would cost them dearly. Spain started with a 7–1 win over Mexico, then a 1–1 draw against Italy which would cause the match to go on a reply. There Spain were eventually eliminating with a 1–7 defeat.

Spain would not compete in another Olympic tournament until the 1968 edition held in Mexico. There the team fielded an under-21 amateur squad and reached the quarter-finals, losing only to the host nation. Meanwhile, communist nations entered their top professional teams using a loophole in the rules.

The team's final two tournaments came in 1976 and 1980, where they failed to make it out of the group stage, being powerless against first teams of the Eastern Bloc.

=== Debut and Gold at the 1992 Summer Olympics ===
The football competition at the 1992 Summer Olympics was the first under-23 competition. Spain were awarded a place at the tournament because they were the host nation. Expectations were high for the Spanish team and they did not disappoint: The team was able to win their first gold medal after winning their group stage, defeating long-time rivals Italy in the quarter-finals and lastly Poland in the finals, 3–2.

=== 1996 Summer Olympics ===
Spain were able to qualify for the following Olympics, managed by then coach Javier Clemente. La Rojita failed to repeat their past success and were eliminated in the quarter-finals by eventual runners-up Argentina.

=== Silver at the 2000 Summer Olympics – Sydney ===
Spain qualified for their third consecutive tournament in 2000. The squad, managed by head coach Iñaki Sáez, reached their second final but were not able to take gold, losing to Cameroon. Spain had a 2–0 lead at half time but things changed in the second half when an own goal from Iván Amaya (who also missed a penalty), and a goal from Samuel Eto'o five minutes later, levelled the scores at 2–2. The score was unchanged after extra time and the match was decided via penalty shootout, with Spain losing 5–3.

=== 2012 Summer Olympics ===
After eight years without participation, Spain qualified for the 2012 Summer Olympics after winning the 2011 UEFA European Under-21 Championship under head coach Luis Milla. They were scheduled to play against Japan, Morocco and Honduras in the group stage. Before the start of the tournament, Spain scheduled three friendly matches against teams that would be competing at the Olympics: The first was a 3–1 victory over Egypt, followed by a 2–0 defeat against Senegal and a 1–0 victory over Mexico five days later. At the Olympics, Spain was eliminated in the group stage after falling shockingly 1–0 to Japan and a controversial loss to Honduras. This was followed by a 0–0 draw to Morocco, forcing Spain's exit from the tournament at the group stage for the first time, and without scoring a single goal. Luis Milla was sacked from both the under-23 and under-21 teams the following day and replaced by Julen Lopetegui.

=== Silver at the 2020 Summer Olympics – Tokyo ===
Spain qualified to the 2020 Olympics after winning the 2019 UEFA European Under-21 Championship. Six Spanish players: Unai Simón, Pau Torres, Eric García, Pedri, Mikel Oyarzabal and Dani Olmo who had participated in the UEFA Euro 2020 played a major role for Spain in the 2020 Olympics under coach Luis de la Fuente. La Rojita reached the final, but they lost 2–1 against Brazil after extra time.

=== Back to back finalist and Gold medal at the 2024 Summer Olympics – France ===
Spain qualified to the 2024 edition of the Olympics as the current U-21 European champions. They entered the competition as one of the heavy favorites to win it. Spain started off their campaign with a 2–1 victory over one of the debutants Uzbekistan, despite a missed Spanish penalty. This was followed by a 3–1 win over the other Olympics debutants Dominican Republic. After securing their place to the quarterfinals, Spain rested some of their key players for the third match against Egypt, which the lost 2–1 thus going to the quarterfinals as the second placed team from their group. In the quarterfinals Spain faced off against the other favorite Japan in what was expected to be a tough match for the Spaniards as Japan had won all their group stage games, and had victory against Argentina (5–2) before the start of the tournament. But this was not to be the case, as the Spaniards ran rampant on their opponents, defeating them 3–0 to advance to the semifinals for a second time in a row. At their semifinal game, they faced Morocco, a team the Spaniards have had somewhat of a problem defeating in recent years and who eliminated Spain in A selection on penalties at the 2022 FIFA World Cup. Although they fell behind at half time 1–0 following an opponent's penalty kick, Spain was able to turn the game around, and in dominant fashion defeated their African counterparts 2–1 to advance to their second consecutive final. In the final, they beat hosts France 5-3 after extra time, in a match that has been described by many as the best Olympic finals. Thus after 32 years, Spain was able to win their second gold medal and completing the double after the senior team won the European trophy a month prior.

== Results and fixtures ==
The following is a list of match results in the last 12 months, as well as any future matches that have been scheduled.

Legend

Win Draw Lose Fixture

=== 2024 ===
18 July Training non-competitive game	Spain	0–0	United States	Bordeaux, France
--:-- UTC+2				Stadium: Stade de Bordeaux

24 July 2024 Olympic Games GS	Uzbekistan	1–2	Spain	Paris, France
15:00 UTC+2	Shomurodov 45+3'	Report	Pubill 28'; Gómez 62'	Stadium: Parc des Princes; Attendance: 33,732; Referee: Dahane Beida (Mauritania)

27 July 2024 Olympic Games GS	Dominican Republic	1–3	Spain	Bordeaux, France
15:00 UTC+2	Ángel Montes 38'	Report	F. López 24'; Baena 55'; Gutiérrez 70'	Stadium: Stade de Bordeaux; Attendance: 16,099; Referee: Adel Al-Naqbi (United Arab Emirates)

30 July 2024 Olympic Games GS	Spain	1–2	Egypt	Bordeaux, France
15:00 UTC+2	Omorodion 90'	Report	Ibrahim Adel 40', 62'	Stadium: Stade de Bordeaux; Attendance: 12,180; Referee: Drew Fischer (Canada)

2 August 2024 Olympic Games QF	Japan	0–3	Spain	Décines-Charpieu, France
17:00 UTC+2		Report	F. López 11', 73'; Ruiz 86'	Stadium: Stade de Lyon; Attendance: 19,111; Referee: Dahane Beida (Mauritania)

5 August 2024 Olympic Games SF	Morocco	1–2	Spain	Marseille, France
18:00 UTC+2	Rahimi 37' (pen.)	Report	F. López 65'; Juanlu 86'	Stadium: Stade de Marseille; Attendance: 59,882; Referee: Ilgiz Tantashev (Uzbekistan)

9 August 2024 Olympic Games Gold	France	3–5 (a.e.t.)	Spain	Paris, France
18:00 UTC+2	Millot 11'; Akliouche 79'; Mateta 90+3' (pen.)	Report	F. López 18', 25'; Baena 28'; Camello 100', 120+1'	Stadium: Parc des Princes; Attendance: 44,260; Referee: Ramon Abatti (Brazil)

== Records ==
=== Most capped players ===
Rank	Player	Club(s)	Year(s)	U-23 Caps
1	Luis Enrique	Sporting Gijón, Real Madrid	1991–1992	14
2	Mikel Lasa	Real Sociedad, Real Madrid	1991–1992	13
3	Abelardo	Sporting Gijón	1991–1992	12
	Pep Guardiola	Barcelona	1991–1992	12
	Kiko	Cádiz	1991–1992	12
	Roberto Solozábal	Atlético Madrid	1991–1992	12
7	Alfonso	Real Madrid	1991–1992	11
	Eric García	Barcelona	2021–2024	11
	Paco Soler	Mallorca	1991–1992	11
10	Juan Miranda	Betis, Bologna	2021–2024	10

Note: Club(s) represents the permanent clubs during the player's time in the Under-23s.

=== Top goalscorers ===
Rank	Player	Club(s)	Year(s)	U-23 Goals
1	Kiko	Cádiz	1991–1992	7
2	Alfonso	Real Madrid	1991–1992	6
	Fermín López	Barcelona	2024	6
4	Abelardo	Sporting Gijón	1991–1992	5
	Ramón Vázquez	Sevilla	1987–1988	4
6	Gabri	Barcelona	2000	3
	Luis Enrique	Sporting Gijón, Real Madrid	1991–1992	3
	José Mari	Milan	2000	3
	Mikel Oyarzabal	Real Sociedad	2021	3
	Carles Rexach	Condal, Barcelona	1967–1970	3
	Rafa Mir	Wolverhampton	2021	3
	Vavá	Elche	1967	3

Note: Club(s) represents the permanent clubs during the player's time in the Under-23s.

- Caps and goals correct as of 5 August 2024.

== Players ==
=== Current squad ===
The following players were named to the squad for the 2024 Summer Olympics.

Caps and goals as of 9 August 2024, after the match against France.

No.	Pos.	Player	Date of birth (age)	Caps	Goals	Club
1	GK	Arnau Tenas	30 May 2001 (aged 23)	5	0	(French Football Federation) Paris Saint-Germain
13	GK	Joan García	4 May 2001 (aged 23)	0	0	(Royal Spanish Football Federation) Espanyol
22	GK	Alejandro Iturbe+	2 September 2003 (aged 20)	1	0	(Royal Spanish Football Federation) Atlético Madrid
2	DF	Marc Pubill	20 June 2003 (aged 21)	5	1	(Royal Spanish Football Federation) Almería
3	DF	Juan Miranda	19 January 2000 (aged 24)	11	0	(Italian Football Federation) Bologna
4	DF	Eric García	9 January 2001 (aged 23)	12	0	(Royal Spanish Football Federation) Barcelona
5	DF	Pau Cubarsí	22 January 2007 (aged 17)	5	0	(Royal Spanish Football Federation) Barcelona
12	DF	Jon Pacheco	8 January 2001 (aged 23)	4	0	(Royal Spanish Football Federation) Real Sociedad
15	DF	Miguel Gutiérrez	27 July 2001 (aged 23)	5	1	(Royal Spanish Football Federation) Girona
19	DF	Cristhian Mosquera+	27 June 2004 (aged 20)	1	0	(The Football Association) Arsenal
20	DF	Juanlu+	15 August 2003 (aged 20)	4	1	(Royal Spanish Football Federation) Sevilla
6	MF	Pablo Barrios	15 June 2003 (aged 21)	6	0	(Royal Spanish Football Federation) Atlético Madrid
8	MF	Beñat Turrientes	31 January 2002 (aged 22)	6	0	(Royal Spanish Football Federation) Real Sociedad
10	MF	Álex Baena*	20 July 2001 (aged 23)	5	2	(Royal Spanish Football Federation) Villarreal
14	MF	Aimar Oroz	27 November 2001 (aged 22)	6	0	(Royal Spanish Football Federation) Osasuna
16	MF	Adrián Bernabé	26 May 2001 (aged 23)	6	0	(Italian Football Federation) Parma
7	FW	Diego López	13 May 2002 (aged 22)	4	0	(Royal Spanish Football Federation) Valencia
9	FW	Abel Ruiz	28 January 2000 (aged 24)	5	1	(Royal Spanish Football Federation) Girona
11	FW	Fermín López*	11 May 2003 (aged 21)	6	6	(Royal Spanish Football Federation) Barcelona
17	FW	Sergio Gómez	4 September 2000 (aged 23)	6	1	(Royal Spanish Football Federation) Real Sociedad
18	FW	Samu Aghehowa	5 May 2004 (aged 20)	4	1	(Portuguese Football Federation) Porto
21	FW	Sergio Camello+	10 February 2001 (aged 23)	2	2	(Royal Spanish Football Federation) Rayo Vallecano

Players who were also called up for Euro 2024 are marked with asterisk (*).

Reserved players, who will play if there is an injured player during the tournament are marked with cross (+).

=== Overage players in Olympic Games ===
Tournament	Player 1	Player 2	Player 3
1996	Did not select		
2000	Did not select		
2012	Juan Mata (MF)	Javi Martínez (MF)	Adrián López (FW)
2020	Mikel Merino (MF)	Dani Ceballos (MF)	Marco Asensio (FW)
2024	Juan Miranda (DF)	Sergio Gómez (FW)	Abel Ruiz (FW)

== Honours ==
Summer Olympics

- Gold medalists (2): 1992, 2024
- Silver medalists (3): 1920, 2000, 2020

== Competitive record ==
=== Olympic Games ===
Rules (UEFA)

- 1900–1904: club teams
- 1908–1988: amateur / youth national teams (Note: the 1924 and 1928 editions were co-organised by FIFA)) (Note: Countries from Eastern Europe competed with professional players.)
- 1992: under-23 national teams
- 1996–present: under-23 national teams (with three 'no age limit' players allowed, after an agreement between FIFA and OIC)

Note

- No tournament held in 1932
- The Royal Spanish Football Federation was founded in 1913. Thus from 1900-1914 Spain did not participate at the Olympic tournaments.

Spain has participated in twelve tournaments at the Summer Olympics. In their first ever participation, Spain achieved a silver medal. It would take Spain seventy-two years for them to achieve another medal at the Olympics, when they hosted the tournament in 1992 Summer Olympics. They defeated Poland in the final to win their very first gold medal. Eight years later at the 2000 Summer Olympics, Spain reached the final, losing on penalties to Cameroon. At the 2020 Summer Olympics held in Tokyo, Spain reached their third final, coming so close yet again this time losing 2-1 against Brazil after extra time. At the 2024 Summer Olympics Spain reached a second consecutive, where they faced against the host France, in a very exciting final, Spain defeated the French by a score line of 5-3, winning their second gold medal after 32 years.

Olympic Games record
Year	Host	Round	Pos.	Pld.	W	D	L	GF	GA
1920	(Belgium) Antwerp	Silver medal	2nd	5	4	0	1	9	5
1924	(France) Paris	First round	17th	1	0	0	1	0	1
1928	(Netherlands) Amsterdam	Quarter-finals	6th	3	1	1	1	9	9
1936	(Germany) Berlin	Withdrew							
1948	(United Kingdom) London	Did not qualify							
1952	(Finland) Helsinki	Did not qualify							
1956	(Australia) Melbourne	Did not qualify							
1960	(Italy) Rome	Did not qualify							
1964	(Japan) Tokyo	Did not qualify							
1968	Mexico City	Quarter-finals	5th	4	2	1	1	4	2
1972	(West Germany) Munich	Did not qualify							
1976	(Canada) Montreal	Group stage	13th	2	0	0	2	1	3
1980	(Soviet Union) Moscow	Group stage	10th	3	0	3	0	2	2
1984	(United States) Los Angeles	Did not qualify							
1988	(South Korea) Seoul	Did not qualify							
1992	(Spain) Barcelona	Gold medal	1st	6	6	0	0	14	2
1996	(United States) Atlanta	Quarter-finals	6th	4	2	1	1	5	7
2000	(Australia) Sydney	Silver medal	2nd	6	4	1	1	12	6
2004	(Greece) Athens	Did not qualify							
2008	(China) Beijing	Did not qualify							
2012	(United Kingdom) London	Group stage	14th	3	0	1	2	0	2
2016	(Brazil) Rio de Janeiro	Did not qualify							
2020	(Japan) Tokyo	Silver medal	2nd	6	3	2	1	9	5
2024	(France) Paris	Gold medal	1st	6	5	0	1	16	8
2028	(United States) Los Angeles	To be determined							
2032	(Australia) Brisbane	To be determined							
Total		:2:3:0	12/28	49	27	10	12	81	52

*Denotes draws including knockout matches decided via penalty shoot-out.
**Since 1968, Spain has sent its under-23 national team.

=== UEFA European Under-23 Challenge Cup ===
This was competed for on a basis similar to a boxing title belt. The holders played a randomly chosen opponent for the championship.

Date	Winners	Runners-up	Venue
18 June 1969	Yugoslavia	Spain	Novi Sad, Yugoslavia

=== UEFA European Under-23 Championship ===
Year	Round	Pld	W	D	L	GF	GA
1972	Qualifying stage	2	0	1	1	2	3
1974	Did not enter						
1976	Did not enter						
Total	0/3	2	0	1	1	2	3

=== Mediterranean Games ===
Mediterranean Games record
Year	Round	Position	Pld	W	D*	L	GF	GA
(Spain) 2005	Gold medalists	1st	4	3	1	0	9	1
Total	1 Gold medal	1/1	4	3	1	0	9	1

== See also ==
- Spain national football team
- Spain national under-21 football team
- Spain national under-20 football team
- Spain national under-19 football team
- Spain national under-18 football team
- Spain national under-17 football team
- Spain national under-16 football team
- Spain national under-15 football team
- Spain national youth football team
