= 2022–23 Villarreal CF season =

Villarreal
2022–23 season
- President: Fernando Roig
- Head coach: Unai Emery (until 24 October); Quique Setién (from 25 October)
- Stadium: Estadio de la Cerámica; Ciutat de València (temporary)
- La Liga: 5th
- Copa del Rey: Round of 16
- UEFA Europa Conference League: Round of 16
- Top goalscorer: League: Nicolas Jackson (12); All: José Luis Morales (14)
- Biggest win: Santa Amalia 0–9 Villarreal
- Biggest defeat: Barcelona 3–0 Villarreal; Lech Poznań 3–0 Villarreal
Home colours	Away colours	Third colours

The 2022–23 season was the 100th season in the history of Villarreal CF and their 10th consecutive season in the top flight. The club participated in La Liga, the Copa del Rey, and the UEFA Europa Conference League.

This season was the first since 2007–08 or 2009–10 without veteran right-back Mario Gaspar who departed to join English club Watford F.C. following the end of the previous campaign.

== Players ==
=== First-team squad ===
As of 25 January 2023

Note: Flags indicate national team as defined under FIFA eligibility rules; some limited exceptions apply. Players may hold more than one non-FIFA nationality.

No.	Pos.	Nation	Player
1	GK	ESP	Pepe Reina
2	DF	ESP	Kiko Femenía
3	DF	ESP	Raúl Albiol (captain)
4	DF	ESP	Pau Torres
5	DF	ESP	Jorge Cuenca
6	MF	FRA	Étienne Capoue
7	FW	ESP	Gerard Moreno
8	DF	ARG	Juan Foyth
10	MF	ESP	Dani Parejo
11	FW	NGR	Samuel Chukwueze
12	DF	COL	Johan Mojica
14	MF	ESP	Manu Trigueros (vice-captain)

No.	Pos.	Nation	Player
15	FW	SEN	Nicolas Jackson
16	MF	ESP	Álex Baena
17	MF	ARG	Giovani Lo Celso (on loan from Tottenham Hotspur)
18	DF	ESP	Alberto Moreno
19	MF	FRA	Francis Coquelin
20	MF	ESP	Manu Morlanes
21	MF	ESP	Yeremy Pino
22	FW	ESP	José Luis Morales
23	DF	ALG	Aïssa Mandi
24	DF	ESP	Alfonso Pedraza
35	GK	DEN	Filip Jörgensen

=== Reserve team ===
Note: Flags indicate national team as defined under FIFA eligibility rules; some limited exceptions apply. Players may hold more than one non-FIFA nationality.

No.	Pos.	Nation	Player
26	MF	ESP	Alberto del Moral
27	FW	ESP	Diego Collado
28	MF	ESP	Carlo Adriano
31	GK	AND	Iker Álvarez
32	MF	ESP	Antonio Pacheco

No.	Pos.	Nation	Player
33	DF	SEN	Mamadou Fall (on loan from Los Angeles FC)
36	DF	ESP	Dani Tasende
37	DF	ESP	Adrián de la Fuente
40	MF	ESP	Rodri Alonso

=== Out on loan ===
Note: Flags indicate national team as defined under FIFA eligibility rules; some limited exceptions apply. Players may hold more than one non-FIFA nationality.

No.	Pos.	Nation	Player
—	MF	ESP	Iván Martín (at Girona until 30 June 2023)
—	MF	ESP	Vicente Iborra (at Levante until 30 June 2023)

No.	Pos.	Nation	Player
—	FW	SEN	Boulaye Dia (at Salernitana until 30 June 2023)
—	FW	NED	Arnaut Danjuma (at Tottenham Hotspur until 30 June 2023)

== Transfers ==
=== In ===
Date	Player	From	Type	Fee	Ref.
1 July 2022	(Spain) Álex Baena	Girona	Loan return		
1 July 2022	(Spain) Jorge Cuenca	Getafe	Loan return		
1 July 2022	(Spain) Manu Morlanes	Espanyol	Loan return		
1 July 2022	(Spain) José Luis Morales	Levante	Transfer	Free	
8 July 2022	(Spain) Pepe Reina	(Italy) Lazio	Transfer	Free	
28 July 2022	(Spain) Kiko Femenía	(England) Watford	Transfer	Undisclosed	
14 August 2022	(Argentina) Giovani Lo Celso	(England) Tottenham Hotspur	Loan		
1 September 2022	(Colombia) Johan Mojica	Elche	Transfer	€5.5M	

=== Out ===
Date	Player	To	Type	Fee	Ref.
1 July 2022	(Ivory Coast) Serge Aurier	(England) Nottingham Forest	Released		
1 July 2022	(Spain) Rubén Peña	Osasuna	Transfer	Free	
4 July 2022	(Spain) Xavi Quintillà	(Portugal) Santa Clara	Transfer	Free	
7 July 2022	(Spain) Sergio Asenjo	Valladolid	Transfer	Free	
28 July 2022	(Spain) Moi Gómez	Osasuna	Transfer	€1.8M	
28 July 2022	(Spain) Mario Gaspar	(England) Watford	Transfer	Free	
29 July 2022	(Spain) Vicente Iborra	Levante	Loan		
16 August 2022	(Ecuador) Pervis Estupiñán	(England) Brighton & Hove Albion	Transfer	€17.8M	
18 August 2022	(Senegal) Boulaye Dia	(Italy) Salernitana	Loan		
19 August 2022	(Spain) Paco Alcácer	(United Arab Emirates) Sharjah	Transfer	Free	
6 January 2023	(Argentina) Gerónimo Rulli	(Netherlands) Ajax	Transfer	Undisclosed	
25 January 2023	(Netherlands) Arnaut Danjuma	(England) Tottenham Hotspur	Loan		

== Pre-season and friendlies ==
Win Draw Loss Fixtures

14 July 2022 Friendly	Sporting CP	1–1	Villarreal	Faro/Loulé, Portugal
21:00 WEST (UTC+1)	Gonçalves 40'	Report	Baena 76'	Stadium: Estádio Algarve; Referee: Ricardo Baixinho (Portugal)

16 July 2022 Friendly	PSV Eindhoven	1–2	Villarreal	Eindhoven, Netherlands
19:00 CEST (UTC+2)	De Jong 25'; Hoever (yellow card) 56'	Report	Pino 46'; Jackson 79'	Stadium: Philips Stadion; Referee: Martin van den Kerkhof (Netherlands)

22 July 2022 Friendly	Borussia Dortmund	0–2	Villarreal	Altach, Austria
19:00 CEST (UTC+2)	Süle (yellow card) 74'	Report	Gerard 45'; Chukwueze 67'	Stadium: Stadion Schnabelholz; Referee: Sebastian Gishamer (Austria)

24 July 2022 Friendly	Reims	0–1	Villarreal	Reims, France
19:00 CEST (UTC+2)	Locko (yellow card) 18'; Cajuste (yellow card) 50'; Kebbal (yellow card) 53'	Report	Dia 37'; Pino (yellow card) 90'	Stadium: Stade Auguste Delaune; Referee: Willy Delajod (France)

30 July 2022 Friendly	Southampton	1–2	Villarreal	Southampton, England
15:00 BST (UTC+1)	Aribo 64'	Report	Pino 15'; Gerard 72'	Stadium: St Mary's Stadium; Attendance: 11,734; Referee: Anthony Taylor (England)

31 July 2022 Friendly	Fulham	1–1	Villarreal	Fulham, England
15:00 BST (UTC+1)	Kebano (yellow card) 57'; Mitrović (yellow card) 66', (goal) 86'	Report	Foyth (yellow card) 15'; Parejo 34'; Albiol (yellow card) 80'	Stadium: Craven Cottage; Referee: John Brooks (England)

3 August 2022 Friendly	Villarreal	3–1	Levante	Villarreal
20:00 CEST (UTC+2)	Pier 17' (o.g.); Niño 25'; Morales 71' (pen.)	Report	Iborra 90+1'	Stadium: Ciudad Deportiva Villarreal CF; Referee: Sergio Claudio Muresan

6 August 2022 Friendly	Inter Milan	2–4	Villarreal	Pescara, Italy
20:30 CEST (UTC+2)	Çalhanoğlu (yellow card) 22'; Lukaku 36'; D'Ambrosio 65', (yellow card) 78'	Report	Pedraza 29', 48'; Jackson (yellow card) 39', (goal) 81'; Coquelin 43'	Stadium: Stadio Adriatico – Giovanni Cornacchia; Referee: Antonio Rapuano (Italy)

3 December 2022 Friendly	Fenerbahçe	2–1	Villarreal	Istanbul, Turkey
19:00 TRT (UTC+3)	Dursun 30' (pen.); King 77'; Bruma (yellow card) 87'; Szalai (yellow card) 89'	Report	Capoue 23'; Baena (yellow card) 82'	Stadium: Şükrü Saracoğlu Stadium; Referee: Erkan Özdamar (Turkey)

6 December 2022 Friendly	Galatasaray	3–4	Villarreal	Istanbul, Turkey
20:00 TRT (UTC+3)	Gomis 42'; Bardakcı 58'; Aktürkoğlu (yellow card) 81'; Baltacı (yellow card) 85'; Demiroğlu 90+4' (pen.)	Report	Coquelin 22'; Mojica 27'; Chukwueze 32'; Medina 44'; Baena (yellow card) 70'; Capoue (yellow card) 81'; Parejo (yellow card) 81'	Stadium: Nef Stadium; Referee: Cagdas Altay (Turkey)

15 December 2022 Friendly	Aston Villa	0–1	Villarreal	Birmingham, England
20:00 GMT (UTC±0)		Report	Capoue 77'	Stadium: Villa Park; Attendance: 13,591; Referee: Darren Bond (England)

17 December 2022 Friendly	Napoli	2–3	Villarreal	Naples, Italy
20:30 CET (UTC+1)	Osimhen 14'; Kvaratskhelia 79' (pen.)	Report	Capoue 12'; Jackson 67'; Gerard 70'	Stadium: Stadio Diego Armando Maradona; Attendance: 24,600; Referee: Federico Dionisi (Italy)

== Competitions ==
=== Overall record ===
Competition	First match	Last match	Starting round	Final position	Record							
Competition	First match	Last match	Starting round	Final position	Pld	W	D	L	GF	GA	GD	Win %
La Liga	13 August 2022	4 June 2023	Matchday 1	5th	38	19	7	12	59	40	+19	50.00
Copa del Rey	12 November 2022	19 January 2023	First round	Round of 16	4	3	0	1	17	4	+13	75.00
UEFA Europa Conference League	18 August 2022	16 March 2023	Play-off round	Round of 16	10	6	2	2	21	13	+8	60.00
Total					52	28	9	15	97	57	+40	53.85

Source: Soccerway

=== La Liga ===
==== League table ====
Pos	Team	Pld	W	D	L	GF	GA	GD	Pts	Qualification or relegation
3	Atlético Madrid	38	23	8	7	70	33	+37	77	Qualification for the Champions League group stage
4	Real Sociedad	38	21	8	9	51	35	+16	71	Qualification for the Champions League group stage
5	Villarreal	38	19	7	12	59	40	+19	64	Qualification for the Europa League group stage
6	Real Betis	38	17	9	12	46	41	+5	60	Qualification for the Europa League group stage
7	Osasuna	38	15	8	15	37	42	−5	53	Qualification for the Europa Conference League play-off round (Note: Osasuna were initially disqualified from the 2023–24 UEFA Europa Conference League due to historic match-fixing. However, the club became later eligible to participate after an evidence of innocence had been provided.)

Source: LaLiga Santander
Rules for classification: 1) Points; 2) Head-to-head points; 3) Head-to-head goal difference; 4) Goal difference; 5) Goals scored; 6) Fair-play points (Note: Head-to-head record is used only after all the matches between the teams in question have been played)

==== Results summary ====
Overall								Home						Away					
Pld	W	D	L	GF	GA	GD	Pts	W	D	L	GF	GA	GD	W	D	L	GF	GA	GD
38	19	7	12	59	40	+19	64	12	3	4	36	18	+18	7	4	8	23	22	+1

Source: La Liga

==== Results by round ====
Round	1	2	3	4	5	6	7	8	9	10	11	12	13	14	15	16	17	18	19	20	21	22	23	24	25	26	27	28	29	30	31	32	33	34	35	36	37	38
Ground	A	A	A	H	A	H	A	A	H	A	H	A	H	A	H	H	A	H	H	A	H	A	H	A	H	A	H	A	H	A	H	H	A	H	A	H	A	H
Result	W	W	D	W	L	D	D	L	W	L	W	L	L	W	W	W	D	W	L	L	L	L	W	W	D	W	W	W	L	L	W	W	D	W	W	W	L	D
Position	3	1	5	3	5	6	8	9	7	9	7	8	9	9	7	6	5	5	5	6	8	9	7	6	6	6	6	5	6	6	5	5	5	5	5	5	5	5

Source: La Liga
A = Away; H = Home; W = Win; D = Draw; L = Loss

==== Matches ====
The league fixtures were announced on 23 June 2022.

13 August 2022 1	Valladolid	0–3	Villarreal	Valladolid
19:00 CEST (UTC+2)	Mesa (yellow card) 52'	Report	Jackson 49'; Baena 81', 90'	Stadium: José Zorrilla; Attendance: 17,543; Referee: Mario Melero López

21 August 2022 2	Atlético Madrid	0–2	Villarreal	Madrid
19:30 CEST (UTC+2)	Félix (yellow card) 48'; Giménez (yellow card) 90+1'; Molina (red card) 90+4'	Report	Pino 73'; Parejo (yellow card) 90+3'; Baena (yellow card) 90+4'; Gerard 90+7', (yellow card) 90+9'	Stadium: Cívitas Metropolitano; Attendance: 57,033; Referee: Ricardo de Burgos Bengoetxea

28 August 2022 3	Getafe	0–0	Villarreal	Getafe
17:30 CEST (UTC+2)	Djené (yellow card) 3'	Report	Parejo (yellow card) 39'; Albiol (yellow card) 44'; Coquelin (yellow card) 73'; Torres (yellow card) 90+10'; Pedraza (yellow card) 90+10'	Stadium: Coliseum Alfonso Pérez; Attendance: 9,815; Referee: Jorge Figueroa Vázquez

4 September 2022 4	Villarreal	4–0	Elche	Valencia
18:30 CEST (UTC+2)	Gerard 26'; Lo Celso 36'; Jackson (yellow card) 42'; Coquelin 88'; Morales 90+3'	Report	Guti (yellow card) 43'; Milla (yellow card) 59'; Roco (yellow card) 81'	Stadium: Ciutat de València (Note: Villarreal played home matches at Estadi Ciutat de València, Valencia, instead of their regular stadium, Estadio de la Cerámica, Villarreal, due to ongoing stadium renovations.); Attendance: 13,915; Referee: Miguel Ortiz Arias

11 September 2022 5	Real Betis	1–0	Villarreal	Seville
21:00 CEST (UTC+2)	Rodri 61'; Guardado (yellow card) 89'	Report	Pino (yellow card) 40'	Stadium: Benito Villamarín; Attendance: 53,276; Referee: Ricardo de Burgos Bengoetxea

18 September 2022 6	Villarreal	1–1	Sevilla	Valencia
16:15 CEST (UTC+2)	Baena (yellow card) 41', (goal) 51'	Report	Torres 8'; Bounou (yellow card) 26'; Acuña (yellow card) 38'; Gudelj (yellow card) 45'; Carmona (yellow card) 60'; Telles (yellow card) 69'	Stadium: Ciutat de València; Attendance: 18,292; Referee: Alejandro Hernández Hernández

1 October 2022 7	Cádiz	0–0	Villarreal	Cádiz
14:00 CEST (UTC+2)	Alcaraz (yellow card) 36'; Alejo (yellow card) 49'; Carcelén (red card) 90+3'	Report	Rulli (yellow card) 36'; Coquelin (yellow card) 38'; Baena (yellow card) 75'	Stadium: Nuevo Mirandilla; Attendance: 15,516; Referee: Javier Iglesias Villanueva

9 October 2022 8	Real Sociedad	1–0	Villarreal	San Sebastián
18:30 CEST (UTC+2)	Méndez 33', (yellow card) 68'; Silva (yellow card) 55'; Elustondo (yellow card) 75'; Sola (yellow card) 82'; Fernández (yellow card) 90+1'	Report	Lo Celso (yellow card) 44'; Albiol (yellow card) 65'; Torres (yellow card) 78'	Stadium: Anoeta; Attendance: 32,689; Referee: César Soto Grado

17 October 2022 9	Villarreal	2–0	Osasuna	Valencia
21:00 CEST (UTC+2)	Danjuma 42', 52' (pen.); Albiol (yellow card) 66'; Trigueros (yellow card) 90+2'	Report	Brašanac (yellow card) 27'; Herrera (yellow card) 49'; Cruz (yellow card) 61'; Kike (yellow card) 66'; R. García (yellow card) 72'; Oroz (yellow card) 78'	Stadium: Ciutat de València; Attendance: 9,699; Referee: Pablo González Fuertes

20 October 2022 10	Barcelona	3–0	Villarreal	Barcelona
21:00 CEST (UTC+2)	Lewandowski 31', 35'; Fati 38'	Report	Torres (yellow card) 90+2'	Stadium: Camp Nou; Attendance: 73,261; Referee: Carlos del Cerro Grande

23 October 2022 11	Villarreal	2–1	Almería	Valencia
18:30 CEST (UTC+2)	Moreno (yellow card) 7'; Baena (yellow card) 23' (yellow-red card) 56', (goal) 56'; Torres (yellow card) 57'; Jackson 90+4'	Report	Melero 31'; Akieme (yellow card) 61'	Stadium: Ciutat de València; Attendance: 13,816; Referee: Ricardo De Burgos Bengoetxea

30 October 2022 12	Athletic Bilbao	1–0	Villarreal	Bilbao
18:30 CET (UTC+1)	R. García (yellow card) 45'; I. Williams 59'; Vesga (yellow card) 89'	Report	Moreno (yellow card) 50'	Stadium: San Mamés; Attendance: 46,081; Referee: Miguel Ángel Ortiz Arias

6 November 2022 13	Villarreal	0–2	Mallorca	Valencia
18:30 CET (UTC+1)	Chukwueze (yellow card) 49'; Moreno (yellow card) 58'; Baena (yellow card) 64'; Torres (yellow card) 75'	Report	Muriqi 32'; Baba (yellow card) 41'; González (yellow card) 47'; Lee (yellow card) 55'; Rodríguez (yellow card) 60'; Muriqi (yellow card) 71'; Ndiaye 75'; Costa (yellow card) 83'	Stadium: Ciutat de València; Attendance: 16,603; Referee: Alejandro Muñiz Ruiz

9 November 2022 14	Espanyol	0–1	Villarreal	Cornellà de Llobregat
20:00 CET (UTC+1)	Melamed (yellow card) 89'	Report	Capoue (yellow card) 38'; Lecomte 64' (o.g.); Pino (yellow card) 79'; Albiol (yellow card) 90+2'	Stadium: RCDE Stadium; Attendance: 17,400; Referee: Javier Iglesias Villanueva

31 December 2022 15	Villarreal	2–1	Valencia	Villarreal
16:15 CET (UTC+1)	Chukwueze 45'; Foyth (yellow card) 80', (goal) 88'	Report	Cavani 21', (yellow card) 90+3'; Musah (yellow card) 35'; Cömert (yellow card) 56'; Moriba (yellow card) 73'	Stadium: Estadio de la Cerámica; Attendance: 19,247; Referee: José María Sánchez Martínez

7 January 2023 16	Villarreal	2–1	Real Madrid	Villarreal
16:15 CET (UTC+1)	Torres (yellow card) 16'; Pino 47'; Gerard 63' (pen.); Albiol (yellow card) 75'; Baena (yellow card) 90+3'; Reina (yellow card) 90+5'	Report	Benzema 60' (pen.); Camavinga (yellow card) 90+7'	Stadium: Estadio de la Cerámica; Attendance: 21,088; Referee: César Soto Grado

13 January 2023 17	Celta Vigo	1–1	Villarreal	Vigo
19:00 CET (UTC+1)	Larsen 68'	Report	Gerard 15'; Trigueros (yellow card) 26'; Morales (yellow card) 68'	Stadium: Balaídos; Attendance: 13,931; Referee: Javier Alberola Rojas

22 January 2023 18	Villarreal	1–0	Girona	Villarreal
14:00 CET (UTC+1)	Gerard (yellow card) 18', (penalty missed) 90+3'; Pino (yellow card) 25'; Torres (yellow card) 37'; Baena (yellow card) 45+1'; Moreno (yellow card) 90+6'; Parejo 90+11' (pen.)	Report	Bueno (yellow card) 3' (yellow-red card) 78'; Gutiérrez (yellow card) 32'; Stuani (yellow card) 40'; Juanpe (yellow card) 90+9'	Stadium: Estadio de la Cerámica; Attendance: 15,558; Referee: Carlos del Cerro Grande

30 January 2023 19	Villarreal	0–1	Rayo Vallecano	Villarreal
21:00 CET (UTC+1)	Foyth (yellow card) 66'; Baena (yellow card) 90+5'	Report	Ciss (yellow card) 35'; Martín (yellow card) 52'; Camello 70'; U. López (yellow card) 87'	Stadium: Estadio de la Cerámica; Attendance: 13,789; Referee: Juan Luis Pulido Santana

4 February 2023 20	Elche	3–1	Villarreal	Elche
16:15 CET (UTC+1)	Milla 3', 48' (pen.), 52' (pen.); Palacios (yellow card) 20'; Carmona (yellow card) 25'; Mascarell (yellow card) 37'; Fidel (yellow card) 85'	Report	Gerard 22'; Baena (yellow card) 59'; Cuenca (yellow card) 74'	Stadium: Martínez Valero; Attendance: 18,421; Referee: José Luis Munuera Montero

12 February 2023 21	Villarreal	0–1	Barcelona	Villarreal
21:00 CET (UTC+1)	Torres (yellow card) 38'; Baena (yellow card) 49'; Parejo (yellow card) 62'; Moreno (yellow card) 71'	Report	Pedri 18'; Araújo (yellow card) 43'; De Jong (yellow card) 56'; Koundé (yellow card) 58'; Raphinha (yellow card) 81'	Stadium: Estadio de la Cerámica; Attendance: 21,178; Referee: Alejandro Hernández Hernández

18 February 2023 22	Mallorca	4–2	Villarreal	Palma
18:30 CET (UTC+1)	Kadewere 20'; Rodríguez (yellow card) 23', (goal) 45', 56'; Raíllo (yellow card) 37'; Muriqi 63'; Costa (yellow card) 69'; Copete (yellow card) 72'; Nastasić (yellow card) 89'	Report	Trigueros (red card) 22'; Morales 43'; Chukwueze 50'	Stadium: Visit Mallorca Stadium; Attendance: 13,957; Referee: José María Sánchez Martínez

27 February 2023 23	Villarreal	2–1	Getafe	Villarreal
21:00 CET (UTC+1)	Chukwueze 44'; Morales 52'	Report	Ünal 9'; Arambarri (yellow card) 56'	Stadium: Estadio de la Cerámica; Attendance: 13,090; Referee: Jorge Figueroa Vázquez

4 March 2023 24	Almería	0–2	Villarreal	Almería
16:15 CET (UTC+1)	De la Hoz (yellow card) 14'; Chumi (yellow card) 55'; Suárez (yellow card) 90+3'	Report	Foyth (yellow card) 56'; Albiol (yellow card) 67'; Gerard 76', (yellow card) 80'; Morales 88'; Lo Celso (yellow card) 90+3'	Stadium: Power Horse Stadium; Attendance: 13,311; Referee: Pablo González Fuertes

12 March 2023 25	Villarreal	1–1	Real Betis	Villarreal
18:30 CET (UTC+1)	Gerard (yellow card) 40'; Pino 55'; Baena (yellow card) 63'; Torres (yellow card) 76'	Report	Rodríguez (yellow card) 6'; Iglesias 38'; Luiz Henrique (yellow card) 89'	Stadium: Estadio de la Cerámica; Attendance: 19,174; Referee: Miguel Ángel Ortiz Arias

19 March 2023 26	Osasuna	0–3	Villarreal	Pamplona
16:15 CET (UTC+1)	Vidal (yellow card) 39'; Torró (yellow card) 47'; Brašanac (yellow card) 72'	Report	Chukwueze 14'; Pino (yellow card) 57'; Morales 85', 90+3', (yellow card) 87'	Stadium: El Sadar; Attendance: 20,169; Referee: Alejandro Muñiz Ruiz

2 April 2023 27	Villarreal	2–0	Real Sociedad	Villarreal
18:30 CEST (UTC+2)	Terrats (yellow card) 26'; Reina (yellow card) 53'; Foyth (yellow card) 65'; Parejo 77' (pen.); Jackson 81', (yellow card) 82' (yellow-red card) 90+1'	Report	Zubeldia (yellow card) 27'; Zubimendi (yellow card) 75'; Silva (yellow card) 76'	Stadium: Estadio de la Cerámica; Attendance: 18,768; Referee: Jesús Gil Manzano

8 April 2023 28	Real Madrid	2–3	Villarreal	Madrid
21:00 CEST (UTC+2)	Torres 16' (o.g.); Vinícius 48'	Report	Pino (yellow card) 25'; Pedraza (yellow card) 35'; Chukwueze 39', 80'; Foyth (yellow card) 69'; Morales 70'	Stadium: Santiago Bernabéu; Attendance: 57,887; Referee: Javier Alberola Rojas

15 April 2023 29	Villarreal	1–2	Valladolid	Villarreal
14:00 CEST (UTC+2)	Pedraza (yellow card) 30'; Capoue 74'	Report	Amallah 2', (yellow card) 41'; El Yamiq 34'; Monchu (yellow card) 56'; Masip (yellow card) 69'; Mesa (yellow card) 88'; Kike (yellow card) 90+1'; Kenedy (yellow card) 90+2'	Stadium: Estadio de la Cerámica; Attendance: 14,876; Referee: Javier Iglesias Villanueva

23 April 2023 30	Sevilla	2–1	Villarreal	Seville
21:00 CEST (UTC+2)	Mir 34'; Lamela (yellow card) 85'; En-Nesyri 90+4'	Report	Torres 57'; Foyth (yellow card) 70'; Mandi (yellow card) 73'	Stadium: Ramón Sánchez Pizjuán; Attendance: 29,635; Referee: Ricardo de Burgos Bengoetxea

27 April 2023 31	Villarreal	4–2	Espanyol	Villarreal
19:30 CEST (UTC+2)	Jackson (yellow card) 16', (goal) 80'; Capoue 53', 90+2'; Pino (yellow card) 58'; Parejo (penalty missed) 63', 63'	Report	Calero (yellow card) 40'; Puado 45', (yellow card) 58'; Montes (yellow card) 62'; Joselu 73'; Gil (yellow card) 77'; Expósito (red card) 90+5'	Stadium: Estadio de la Cerámica; Attendance: 16,134; Referee: César Soto Grado

30 April 2023 32	Villarreal	3–1	Celta Vigo	Villarreal
16:15 CEST (UTC+2)	Jackson 2', 12'; Capoue (yellow card) 22'; Parejo (penalty missed) 26'; Terrats 70'	Report	Seferovic (yellow card) 25'; Larsen 29'; Vázquez (yellow card) 45+1'; Núñez (yellow card) 49'; Tapia (yellow card) 54'	Stadium: Estadio de la Cerámica; Attendance: 16,123; Referee: Pablo González Fuertes

3 May 2023 33	Valencia	1–1	Villarreal	Valencia
19:30 CEST (UTC+2)	González (yellow card) 27'; Lino (yellow card) 27', (goal) 72'; Correia (yellow card) 39'; Cavani (yellow card) 45+1'	Report	Jackson (yellow card) 41', (goal) 62'; Parejo (yellow card) 56'	Stadium: Mestalla; Attendance: 43,634; Referee: Jesús Gil Manzano

13 May 2023 34	Villarreal	5–1	Athletic Bilbao	Villarreal
18:30 CEST (UTC+2)	Capoue (yellow card) 1'; Baena 56', 90'; Jackson 37', 50'; Parejo (yellow card) 45'; Pedraza (yellow card) 58'; Paredes 61' (o.g.)	Report	Sancet 45+3' (pen.); Herrera (yellow card) 54'; Paredes (yellow card) 54'; I. Williams (yellow card) 68'	Stadium: Estadio de la Cerámica; Attendance: 16,871; Referee: Carlos del Cerro Grande

20 May 2023 35	Girona	1–2	Villarreal	Girona
14:00 CEST (UTC+2)	López 24', (yellow card) 55'; Herrera (yellow card) 71'	Report	Pino 9', (yellow card) 23'; Gerard 90+4'	Stadium: Montilivi; Attendance: 11,649; Referee: Valentín Pizarro Gómez

24 May 2023 36	Villarreal	2–0	Cádiz	Villarreal
19:30 CEST (UTC+2)	Jackson 20', 45+2'; Moreno (yellow card) 63'	Report	San Emeterio (yellow card) 36'; Alcaraz (yellow card) 67'	Stadium: Estadio de la Cerámica; Attendance: 15,099; Referee: Juan Luis Pulido Santana

28 May 2023 37	Rayo Vallecano	2–1	Villarreal	Madrid
19:00 CEST (UTC+2)	De Tomás 56', (yellow card) 68'; Palazón 63'; Valentín (yellow card) 68'; Catena (yellow card) 90+4'	Report	Parejo (yellow card) 40'; Pedraza (yellow card) 59'; Pino (yellow card) 68'; Lo Celso (yellow card) 70', (goal) 83'; Jackson (yellow card) 90+4'	Stadium: Vallecas; Attendance: 11,085; Referee: Javier Iglesias Villanueva

4 June 2023 38	Villarreal	2–2	Atlético Madrid	Villarreal
18:30 CEST (UTC+2)	Jackson 9'; Moreno (yellow card) 36'; Capoue (yellow card) 40'; Baena (yellow card) 75'; Pascual 90+2'	Report	Correa 18', 56', (yellow card) 76'; Barrios (yellow card) 69'; Witsel (red card) 70'	Stadium: Estadio de la Cerámica; Attendance: 18,226; Referee: Ricardo de Burgos Bengoetxea

=== Copa del Rey ===
12 November 2022 First round	Santa Amalia	0–9	Villarreal	Almendralejo
21:00 CET (UTC+1)	Rubio (yellow card) 5'	Report	Collado 31'; Baena 35'; Morales 36'; Chukwueze 47', 49'; Coquelin 61'; Gerard 74', 87'; Capoue 80'	Stadium: Estadio Francisco de la Hera; Referee: Jorge Figueroa Vázquez

20 December 2022 Second round	Guijuelo	1–2 (a.e.t.)	Villarreal	Guijuelo
21:00 CET (UTC+1)	Carmona 14'; Ibañez (yellow card) 97'; Lorenzo (red card) 103'; Trapero (yellow card) 104'; Aizpiri (yellow card) 114'; Roberto (yellow card) 119'	Report	Gerard 41' (pen.); Danjuma 93'	Stadium: Municipal; Attendance: 1,800; Referee: Valentín Pizarro Gómez

3 January 2023 Round of 32	Cartagena	1–5	Villarreal	Cartagena
19:00 CET (UTC+1)	Vázquez 39'; Jansson (yellow card) 62'; Musto (yellow card) 62'; Rico (yellow card) 88'; Alcalá (yellow card) 88'	Report	Femenía (yellow card) 22'; Baena 49'; Danjuma 56'; Morales 60'; Chukwueze 85'; Jackson (yellow card) 88'; Capoue 90'	Stadium: Cartagonova; Attendance: 14,800; Referee: Alejandro Hernández Hernández

19 January 2023 Round of 16	Villarreal	2–3	Real Madrid	Villarreal
21:00 CET (UTC+1)	Capoue 4', (yellow card) 8'; Chukwueze 42'; Reina (yellow card) 80'; Baena (yellow card) 85'; Torres (yellow card) 88'; Parejo (yellow card) 90+5'	Report	Camavinga (yellow card) 36'; Vinícius 57', (yellow card) 90'; Militão 69'; Valverde (yellow card) 72'; Ceballos 86'; Rüdiger (yellow card) 90+3'	Stadium: Estadio de la Cerámica; Attendance: 20,124; Referee: Jesús Gil Manzano

=== UEFA Europa Conference League ===
==== Play-off round ====
The draw for the play-off round was made on 2 August 2022.

18 August 2022 First leg	Villarreal (Spain)	4–2	(Croatia) Hajduk Split	Valencia
20:45 CEST (UTC+2)	Morales 15', 36'; Livaja 19' (o.g.); Baena (yellow card) 32'; Gerard 45+1'; Mandi (yellow card) 82'	Report	Biuk 2'; Livaja (yellow card) 13'; Sahiti (yellow card) 35'; Awaziem (yellow card) 73'; Fossati 85' (pen.); Lovrencsics (yellow card) 90+4'	Stadium: Ciutat de València; Attendance: 11,275; Referee: Aleksei Kulbakov (Belarus)

25 August 2022 Second leg	Hajduk Split (Croatia)	0–2 (2–6 agg.)	(Spain) Villarreal	Split, Croatia
21:00 CEST (UTC+2)	Mikanović (yellow card) 20'	Report	Coquelin (yellow card) 22'; Pedraza 37'; Chukwueze 56'; Gerard (yellow card) 77'; Cuenca (yellow card) 89'	Stadium: Stadion Poljud; Attendance: 30,000; Referee: Andris Treimanis (Latvia)

==== Group stage ====
The draw for the group stage was held on 26 August 2022.

Pos	Team	Pld	W	D	L	GF	GA	GD	Pts	Qualification	VIL	LCH	HBS	AW
1	(Spain) Villarreal	6	4	1	1	14	9	+5	13	Advance to round of 16	—	4–3	2–2	5–0
2	(Poland) Lech Poznań	6	2	3	1	12	7	+5	9	Advance to knockout round play-offs	3–0	—	0–0	4–1
3	(Israel) Hapoel Be'er Sheva	6	1	4	1	8	5	+3	7		1–2	1–1	—	4–0
4	Austria Wien	6	0	2	4	2	15	−13	2		0–1	1–1	0–0	—

Source: UEFA
Rules for classification: Group stage tiebreakers

8 September 2022 1	Villarreal (Spain)	4–3	(Poland) Lech Poznań	Valencia
18:45 CEST (UTC+2)	Chukwueze 32', (yellow card) 64'; Baena 36', 40', (yellow card) 83'; Mandi (yellow card) 46'; Cuenca (yellow card) 51'; Coquelin 89'	Report	Skóraś 2'; Ishak 46' (pen.), 61'; Murawski (yellow card) 85'	Stadium: Ciutat de València; Attendance: 10,385; Referee: Ali Palabıyık (Turkey)

15 September 2022 2	Hapoel Be'er Sheva (Israel)	1–2	(Spain) Villarreal	Be'er Sheva, Israel
22:00 IDT (UTC+3)	Selmani (yellow card) 24'; Hatuel (yellow card) 60', (goal) 63'; Bareiro (yellow card) 84'; Suleymanov (yellow card) 90+2'	Report	Morales 28' (pen.); Pino (yellow card) 46'; Baena 67'; Cuenca (yellow card) 78'; Mojica (yellow card) 83'; Danjuma (penalty missed) 90+6'	Stadium: Turner Stadium; Attendance: 13,413; Referee: Willie Collum (Scotland)

6 October 2022 3	Villarreal (Spain)	5–0	Austria Wien	Valencia
21:00 CEST (UTC+2)	Baena 18'; Danjuma 43'; Capoue (yellow card) 57'; Morales 76', 80', 88'	Report	Kreiker (yellow card) 42'	Stadium: Ciutat de València; Attendance: 9,539; Referee: Jochem Kamphuis (Netherlands)

13 October 2022 4	Austria Wien	0–1	(Spain) Villarreal	Vienna, Austria
18:45 CEST (UTC+2)	Ranftl (yellow card) 26'; Polster (yellow card) 67'	Report	Lo Celso (yellow card) 67'; Jackson (yellow card) 78', (goal) 87'; Morlanes (yellow card) 86'; Baena (yellow card) 90+1'	Stadium: Franz Horr Stadium; Attendance: 11,000; Referee: Georgi Kabakov (Bulgaria)

27 October 2022 5	Villarreal (Spain)	2–2	(Israel) Hapoel Be'er Sheva	Valencia
18:45 CEST (UTC+2)	Chukwueze 57'; Baena (yellow card) 66'; Danjuma 70'	Report	Hemed 48' (pen.); Vítor (yellow card) 54'; Yehezkel (yellow card) 63', (goal) 79'; Lopes (yellow card) 73'; Elias (yellow card) 90+3'	Stadium: Ciutat de València; Attendance: 6,338; Referee: Juxhin Xhaja (Albania)

3 November 2022 6	Lech Poznań (Poland)	3–0	(Spain) Villarreal	Poznań, Poland
21:00 CET (UTC+1)	Velde 27'; Skóraś 51', 77'	Report	Trigueros (yellow card) 72'	Stadium: Stadion Poznań; Attendance: 30,117; Referee: Nathan Verboomen (Belgium)

==== Knockout phase ====
===== Round of 16 =====
The draw for the round of 16 was held on 24 February 2023.

9 March 2023 First leg	Anderlecht (Belgium)	1–1	(Spain) Villarreal	Brussels, Belgium
18:45 CET (UTC+1)	Dreyer 57'	Report	Trigueros 28', (yellow card) 37'	Stadium: Constant Vanden Stock Stadium; Attendance: 15,265; Referee: Bartosz Frankowski (Poland)

16 March 2023 Second leg	Villarreal (Spain)	0–1 (1–2 agg.)	(Belgium) Anderlecht	Villarreal
21:00 CET (UTC+1)	Pino (yellow card) 69'; Cuenca (yellow card) 78'	Report	Murillo (yellow card) 18'; Verschaeren (yellow card) 66'; Slimani (yellow card) 70', (goal) 73'; Ashimeru (yellow card) 82'	Stadium: Estadio de la Cerámica; Attendance: 16,212; Referee: Marco Di Bello (Italy)

== Statistics ==
=== Squad statistics ===
Last updated 4 June 2023.

No.	Pos	Nat	Player	Total		La Liga		Copa del Rey		UEFA Europa Conference League	
No.	Pos	Nat	Player	Apps	Goals	Apps	Goals	Apps	Goals	Apps	Goals
Goalkeepers
1	GK	(Spain) ESP	Pepe Reina	32	0	22	0	3	0	7	0
35	GK	(Denmark) DEN	Filip Jörgensen	6	0	2	0	1	0	3	0
Defenders
2	DF	(Spain) ESP	Kiko Femenía	28	0	13+7	0	2	0	2+4	0
3	DF	(Spain) ESP	Raúl Albiol	27	0	24+1	0	1	0	1	0
4	DF	(Spain) ESP	Pau Torres	39	1	34	1	2	0	0+3	0
5	DF	(Spain) ESP	Jorge Cuenca	23	0	5+5	0	2+1	0	10	0
8	DF	(Argentina) ARG	Juan Foyth	30	1	22+2	1	2+1	0	2+1	0
12	DF	(Colombia) COL	Johan Mojica	27	0	5+12	0	3	0	6+1	0
18	DF	(Spain) ESP	Alberto Moreno	28	0	14+10	0	1	0	2+1	0
23	DF	(Algeria) ALG	Aïssa Mandi	35	0	16+5	0	3+1	0	10	0
24	DF	(Spain) ESP	Alfonso Pedraza	29	1	20+6	0	0+1	0	2	1
33	DF	(Senegal) SEN	Mamadou Fall	7	0	0+1	0	0+1	0	5	0
37	DF	(Spain) ESP	Adrián de la Fuente	5	0	0	0	0	0	5	0
Midfielders
6	MF	(France) FRA	Étienne Capoue	37	6	22+6	3	1+3	3	0+5	0
10	MF	(Spain) ESP	Dani Parejo	50	3	37	3	1+3	0	3+6	0
14	MF	(Spain) ESP	Manu Trigueros	30	1	8+15	0	2+1	0	4	1
16	MF	(Spain) ESP	Álex Baena	39	12	15+11	6	4	2	9	4
17	MF	(Argentina) ARG	Giovani Lo Celso	29	2	14+8	2	0	0	2+5	0
19	MF	(France) FRA	Francis Coquelin	25	3	9+7	1	1+1	1	7	1
20	MF	(Spain) ESP	Manu Morlanes	14	0	2+2	0	0+3	0	7	0
21	MF	(Spain) ESP	Yeremy Pino	46	4	31+5	4	2	0	3+5	0
26	MF	(Spain) ESP	Alberto del Moral	1	0	0+1	0	0	0	0	0
39	MF	(Spain) ESP	Ramon Terrats	18	1	11+5	1	0	0	1+1	0
Forwards
7	FW	(Spain) ESP	Gerard Moreno	29	11	14+7	7	2+1	3	3+2	1
11	FW	(Nigeria) NGR	Samuel Chukwueze	50	13	27+10	6	3+1	4	9	3
15	FW	(Senegal) SEN	Nicolas Jackson	37	13	16+10	12	1	0	3+7	1
22	FW	(Spain) ESP	José Luis Morales	42	15	11+18	7	2+1	2	6+4	6
27	FW	(Spain) ESP	Diego Collado	3	1	0+2	0	1	1	0	0
34	FW	(Spain) ESP	Fer Niño	3	0	0+3	0	0	0	0	0
40	FW	(France) FRA	Haissem Hassan	2	0	0+2	0	0	0	0	0
43	FW	(Spain) ESP	Jorge Pascual	3	1	0+2	1	0	0	0+1	0
Players transferred out during the season
9	FW	(Netherlands) NED	Arnaut Danjuma	17	6	6+4	2	1+1	2	3+2	2
13	GK	(Argentina) ARG	Gerónimo Rulli	14	0	14	0	0	0	0	0
