= Football at the 2024 Summer Olympics – Men's tournament final =

2024 Summer Olympic men's football final
- Parc des Princes in Paris hosted the final
- Event: Football at the 2024 Summer Olympics – Men's tournament
France	Spain
(France)	(Spain)
3	5
- After extra time
- Date: 9 August 2024
- Venue: Parc des Princes, Paris
- Referee: Ramon Abatti (Brazil)
- Attendance: 44,260
- Weather: Partly cloudy 26 °C (79 °F); 58% humidity

The 2024 Summer Olympic football gold medal match was a football match to determine the gold medal winners of men's football tournament at the 2024 Summer Olympics. The match was the 26th final of the men's football tournament at the Olympics, a quadrennial tournament contested by the men's under-23 national teams of the member associations of FIFA to decide the Olympic champions. The match was held at Parc des Princes in Paris, France, on 9 August 2024. This was the first Olympic men's football final to take place before the women's tournament final.

The final was contested between hosts France and previous Games' silver medalists Spain. Both teams were seeking their second Olympic title, having won in 1984 and 1992, respectively. France hoped to emulate Spain's 1992 triumph by winning a home Olympics, while Spain hoped to emulate France's 1984 record of winning the Olympics and the UEFA European Championship, having won the UEFA Euro 2024. At that time, France defeated Spain in the UEFA Euro 1984 final held at Parc des Princes.

Spain won the match 5–3 after extra time, winning a second gold medal and became the first European team to do so since themselves in 1992.

== Venue ==
The final was held at the Parc des Princes in Paris.

The stadium first opened in 1897, and had been refurbished twice since 1972, first for the 1998 FIFA World Cup, and then for the UEFA Euro 2016. It hosted the UEFA Euro finals in 1960 and 1984, as well as six finals in various Europe's club competitions. It also hosted some matches for the 1938 and 1998 World Cups, the 2019 Women's World Cup, and the three aforementioned UEFA Euros.

== Route to the final ==
France
Round
Spain
Opponent
Result
Group stage
Opponent
Result
United States
3–0
Match 1
Uzbekistan
2–1
Guinea
1–0
Match 2
Dominican Republic
3–1
New Zealand
3–0
Match 3
Egypt
1–2
Group A winners

Pos	Team	Pld	Pts
1	France (H)	3	9
2	United States	3	6
3	New Zealand	3	3
4	Guinea	3	0

Source: FIFA
(H) Hosts
Final standings
Group C runners-up

Pos	Team	Pld	Pts
1	Egypt	3	7
2	Spain	3	6
3	Dominican Republic	3	2
4	Uzbekistan	3	1

Source: FIFA
Opponent
Result
Knockout stage
Opponent
Result
Argentina
1–0
Quarter-finals
Japan
3–0
Egypt
3–1 (a.e.t.)
Semi-finals
Morocco
2–1

== Match details ==
9 August 2024
18:00

France	3–5 (a.e.t.)	Spain
Millot 11'; Akliouche 79'; Mateta 90+3' (pen.)	Report	López 18', 25'; Baena 28'; Camello 100', 120+1'

Parc des Princes, Paris
Attendance: 44,260
Referee: Ramon Abatti (Brazil)

France	Spain

GK	16	Guillaume Restes
RB	5	Kiliann Sildillia		(substituted off) 111'
CB	4	Loïc Badé	(yellow card) 45+5'
CB	2	Castello Lukeba
LB	3	Adrien Truffert		(substituted off) 91'
DM	6	Manu Koné	(yellow card) 36'	(substituted off) 106'
CM	12	Enzo Millot		(substituted off) 77'
CM	13	Joris Chotard		(substituted off) 52'
AM	7	Michael Olise
CF	10	Alexandre Lacazette (c)		(substituted off) 52'
CF	14	Jean-Philippe Mateta
Substitutes:
GK	1	Obed Nkambadio
DF	15	Bradley Locko		(substituted on) 91'
DF	17	Soungoutou Magassa		(substituted on) 106'
MF	8	Maghnes Akliouche		(substituted on) 52'
MF	18	Rayan Cherki		(substituted on) 111'
FW	9	Arnaud Kalimuendo		(substituted on) 52'
FW	11	Désiré Doué		(substituted on) 77'
Manager:
Thierry Henry

GK	1	Arnau Tenas
RB	2	Marc Pubill		(substituted off) 73'
CB	4	Eric García
CB	5	Pau Cubarsí
LB	3	Juan Miranda	(yellow card) 90+2'	(substituted off) 98'
CM	6	Pablo Barrios
CM	10	Álex Baena	(yellow card) 78'	(substituted off) 83'
RW	14	Aimar Oroz		(substituted off) 88'
AM	11	Fermín López		(substituted off) 73'
LW	17	Sergio Gómez
CF	9	Abel Ruiz (c)		(substituted off) 83'
Substitutes:
GK	13	Joan García
DF	12	Jon Pacheco	(yellow card) 94'	(substituted on) 88'
DF	15	Miguel Gutiérrez		(substituted on) 98'
DF	20	Juanlu Sánchez		(substituted on) 73'
MF	8	Beñat Turrientes		(substituted on) 83'
MF	16	Adrián Bernabé	(yellow card) 76'	(substituted on) 73'
FW	21	Sergio Camello	(yellow card) 120+2'	(substituted on) 83'
Manager:
Santi Denia

Assistant referees:
Rafael Alves (Brazil)
Guillerme Camilo (Brazil)
Fourth official:
Dahane Beida (Mauritania)
Reserve assistant referee:
Jerson Emiliano dos Santos (Angola)
Video assistant referee:
Tatiana Guzmán (Nicaragua)
Assistant video assistant referees:
David Coote (Great Britain)
Ovidiu Hațegan (Romania)

Match rules

- 90 minutes
- 30 minutes of extra time if necessary
- Penalty shoot-out if scores still level
- Maximum of seven named substitutes
- Maximum of five substitutions, with a sixth allowed in extra time
- Maximum of three substitution opportunities, with a fourth allowed in extra time
