= Arnau Tenas =

Spanish footballer (born 2001)

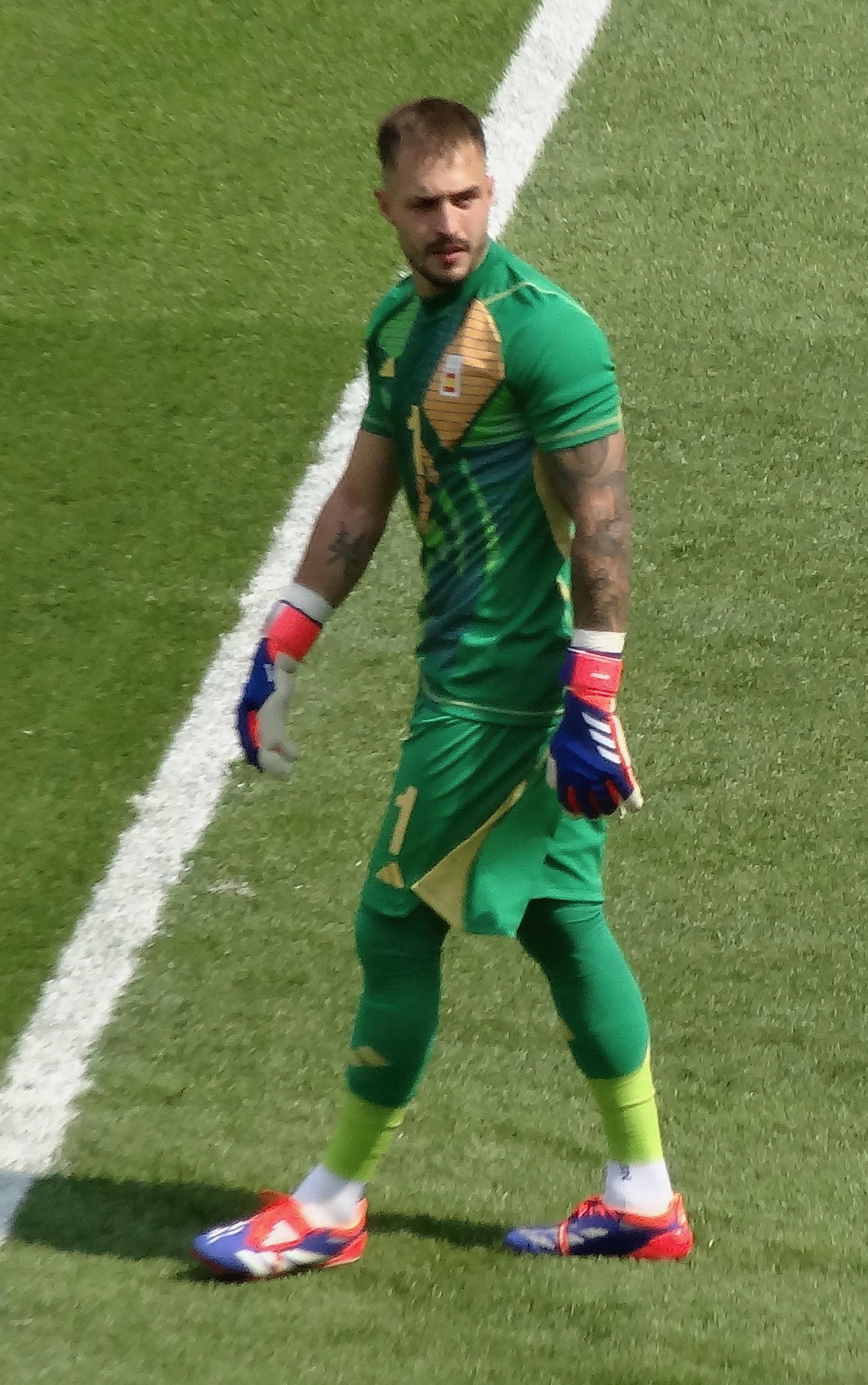
- Tenas playing for Spain U23 in 2024.

Personal information
- Full name: Arnau Tenas Ureña
- Date of birth: 30 May 2001 (age 25)
- Place of birth: Vic, Spain
- Height: 1.85 m (6 ft 1 in)
- Position: Goalkeeper

Team information
- Current team: Mallorca (on loan from Villarreal)
- Number: 1

Youth career
- 2005–2010: Vic Riuprimer
- 2010–2020: Barcelona

Senior career*
Years	Team	Apps	(Gls)
2019–2023	Barcelona B	57	(0)
2023–2025	Paris Saint-Germain	7	(0)
2025–	Villarreal	10	(0)
2026–	→ Mallorca (loan)	12	(0)

International career^{‡}
2017–2018	Spain U17	8	(0)
2018–2020	Spain U18	3	(0)
2019–2020	Spain U19	13	(0)
2021–2023	Spain U21	13	(0)
2023–2024	Spain U23	5	(0)
2024–	Catalonia	2	(0)
Medal record
Men's football
Representing Spain
Olympic Games
Gold medal – first place	2024 Paris
UEFA European Under-21 Championship
Runner-up	2023 Georgia–Romania
UEFA European Under-19 Championship
Winner	2019 Armenia
- * Club domestic league appearances and goals as of 2 November 2026 ‡ National team caps and goals as of 00:51, 19 November 2025 (UTC)

Arnau Tenas Ureña (born 30 May 2001) is a Spanish professional footballer who plays as a goalkeeper for Segunda División club Mallorca, on loan from Villarreal.

== Club career ==
=== Barcelona ===
Born in Vic, Barcelona, Catalonia, Tenas began playing as a goalkeeper at the age of 3, starting with his local side Vic Riuprimer. He joined La Masia in 2010, and worked his way up their youth categories. He made his senior debut for Barcelona B in the Segunda División B in a 2–1 win over Teruel in March 2019. He soon after started training with the senior Barcelona team, and in October 2019 got his made the bench for the first time in a La Liga match against Alavés.

On 27 June 2020, Tenas extended his contract with Barcelona, keeping him at the club until June 2023 with a release clause of € 100m. He was on the bench for the 2021 Copa del Rey Final, as Barcelona beat Athletic Bilbao 4–0.

=== Paris Saint-Germain ===
On 30 July 2023, Tenas signed for Ligue 1 club Paris Saint-Germain on a three-year deal. On 3 December 2023, he made his debut for the club in a 2–0 away victory over Le Havre, coming on as a substitute following the expulsion of Gianluigi Donnarumma eleven minutes into the match.

Tenas went on to make seven saves, the highest number of saves for a goalkeeper as a substitute in a Ligue 1 match since 2016. He was hailed as an "unexpected hero" on the occasion of his first top-flight appearance.

=== Villarreal ===
On 28 August 2025, Tenas joined La Liga club Villarreal on a four-year contract.

==== Loan to Mallorca ====
On 25 July 2026, after being a backup option, Tenas moved to Segunda División side Mallorca on a one-year loan deal.

== International career ==
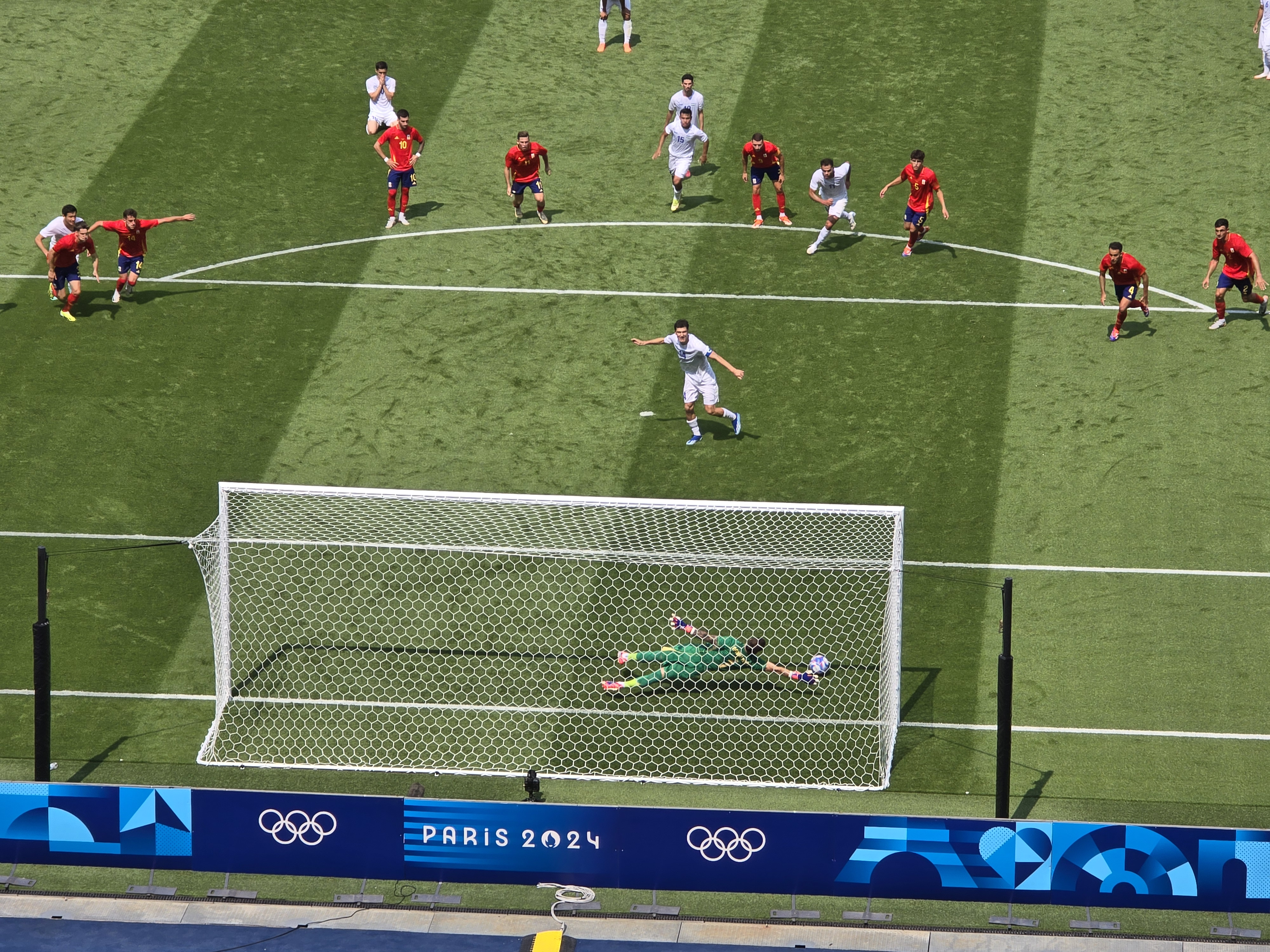
Tenas, with Spain, trying to stop a penalty shoot from Eldor Shomurodov in a game of the 2024 Summer Olympics.

Tenas is a youth international for Spain, having represented the Spain U17s, U18, U19s, and U21s.

He represented Spain at the 2019 UEFA European Under-19 Championship and helped them win the tournament, winning man of the match in the semi-final, and being named goalkeeper of the tournament.

On 26 March 2022, Tenas was an emergency call-up to the Spain national team after Robert Sánchez had to drop out for personal reasons.

Tenas was called up to Spain U21 squad for the 2023 UEFA European Under-21 Championship in Georgia and Romania. He served as the team's first-choice goalkeeper throughout the tournament, where Spain finished as runners-up after a 1–0 defeat to England U21 in the final.

In 2024, Tenas was included in Spain U23 squad for the 2024 Summer Olympics in Paris. He was again the starting goalkeeper under manager Santi Denia, featuring in five of the team's six matches.

In the 120th minute of the gold medal match against France U23, Tenas initiated a counter-attack with a long throw from inside the box that reached Sergio Camello in the centre field, who went on to score Spain's fifth goal. Tenas was credited with an assist, and Spain secured the gold medal with a 5–3 victory.

== Playing style ==
Tenas is known for his reflexes, ball-playing and bravery when coming off his line.

== Personal life ==
Tenas was born into a family of footballers, as his grandfather, and father were both football goalkeepers. His twin brother, Marc, is also a professional footballer playing for Gimnástica Segoviana.

== Career statistics ==
As of match played 2 November 2026

Appearances and goals by club, season and competition
Club	Season	League			National cup (Note: Includes Coupe de France, Copa del Rey)		Europe		Other		Total	
Club	Season	Division	Apps	Goals	Apps	Goals	Apps	Goals	Apps	Goals	Apps	Goals
Barcelona B	2018–19	Segunda División B	1	0	—		—		—		1	0
Barcelona B	2019–20	Segunda División B	0	0	—		—		0	0	0	0
Barcelona B	2020–21	Segunda División B	9	0	—		—		—		9	0
Barcelona B	2021–22	Primera Federación	18	0	—		—		—		18	0
Barcelona B	2022–23	Primera Federación	29	0	—		—		1 (Note: Appearance in Primera Federación play-offs)	0	30	0
Barcelona B	Total		57	0	—		—		1	0	58	0
Paris Saint-Germain	2023–24	Ligue 1	6	0	0	0	0	0	0	0	6	0
Paris Saint-Germain	2024–25	Ligue 1	1	0	1	0	0	0	0	0	2	0
Paris Saint-Germain	Total		7	0	1	0	0	0	0	0	8	0
Villarreal	2025–26	La Liga	10	0	2	0	3 (Note: Appearances in UEFA Champions League)	0	—		15	0
Mallorca (loan)	2026–27	Segunda División	12	0	0	0	—		—		12	0
Career total			86	0	3	0	3	0	1	0	93	0

== Honours ==
Barcelona

- La Liga: 2022–23
- Supercopa de España: 2023

Paris Saint-Germain

- Ligue 1: 2023–24, 2024–25
- Coupe de France: 2024–25
- UEFA Champions League: 2024–25
- FIFA Club World Cup runner-up: 2025

Spain U19

- UEFA European Under-19 Championship: 2019

Spain U21

- UEFA European Under-21 Championship runner-up: 2023

Spain U23

- Summer Olympics gold medal: 2024

Individual

- UEFA European Under-19 Championship Team of the Tournament: 2019
