= Pau Torres =

Spanish footballer (born 1997)

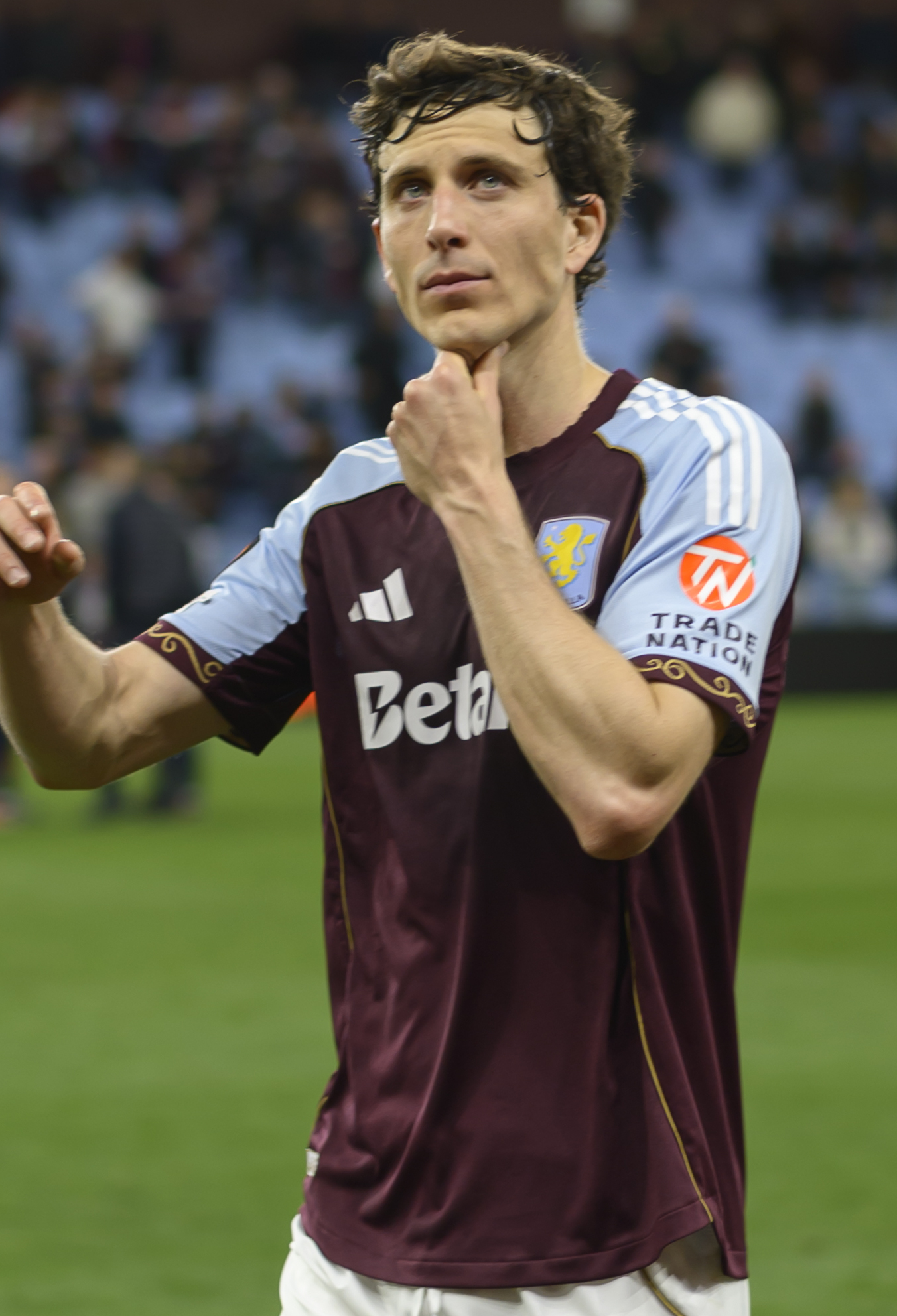
- Torres with Aston Villa in 2026

Personal information
- Full name: Pau Francisco Torres
- Date of birth: 16 January 1997 (age 29)
- Place of birth: Villarreal, Spain
- Height: 1.91 m (6 ft 3 in)
- Position: Centre-back

Team information
- Current team: Aston Villa
- Number: 14

Youth career
- 2002–2016: Villarreal

Senior career*
Years	Team	Apps	(Gls)
2016–2018	Villarreal B	59	(2)
2016–2023	Villarreal	136	(10)
2018–2019	→ Málaga (loan)	38	(1)
2023–	Aston Villa	82	(2)

International career
2018	Spain U21	1	(0)
2021	Spain U23	7	(0)
2019–2023	Spain	24	(1)
Medal record
Representing Spain
Men's Football
UEFA Nations League
Runner-up	2021 Italy
Olympic Games
Silver medal – second place	2020 Tokyo	Team
UEFA European Championship
Bronze medal – third place	2020 Europe
- * Club domestic league appearances and goals as of 21:15, 21 November 2026 (UTC)

Pau Francisco Torres (born 16 January 1997) is a Spanish professional footballer who plays as a centre-back for Premier League club Aston Villa.

He began his career with Villarreal, making 173 competitive appearances and winning the 2021 Europa League; he was also loaned to Málaga. In July 2023, he signed with Aston Villa, winning his second Europa League in 2026.

Torres made his full debut for Spain in 2019, scoring in his first game. He was part of the squads at Euro 2020 and the 2022 World Cup.

== Club career ==
=== Villarreal ===
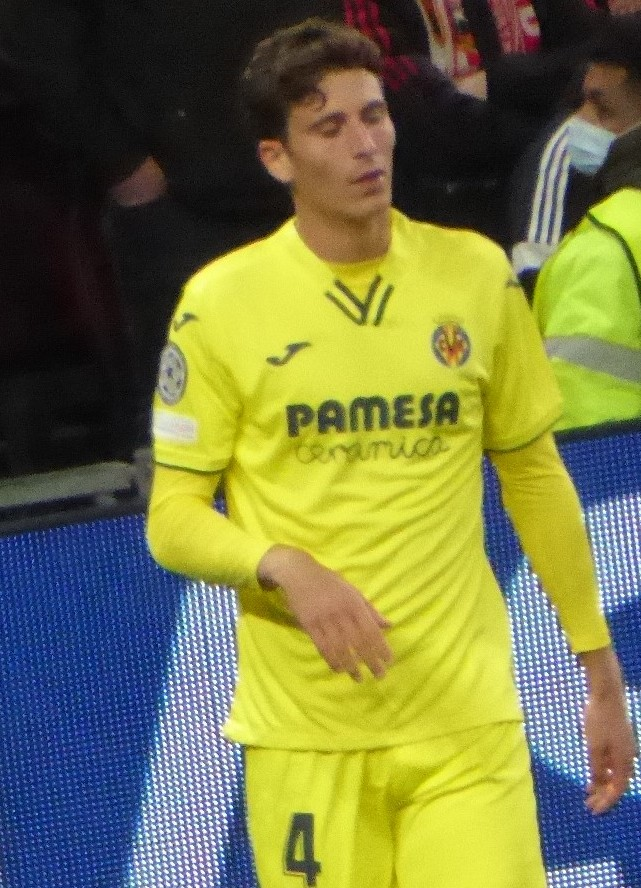
Torres playing for Villarreal in 2021

Born in Villarreal, Province of Castellón, Valencian Community, Torres played youth football with Villarreal. He made his league debut with the reserves on 21 August 2016, starting in a 1–0 Segunda División B away loss against Cornellà.

Torres scored his first senior goal on 8 October 2016, the first in a 2–2 home draw with Badalona. His maiden competitive appearance for the first team took place on 20 December, when he came on as a late substitute for Víctor Ruiz in the 1–1 home draw against Toledo in the round of 32 of Copa del Rey; by doing so, he became the first player born in Villarreal to debut for the club in 13 years.

Torres played his first match in La Liga on 26 November 2017, replacing fellow youth graduate Manu Trigueros late into a 2–3 home loss to Sevilla. He made his UEFA Europa League debut ten days later, starting and finishing the 0–1 group stage defeat against Maccabi Tel Aviv also at the Estadio de la Cerámica.

On 6 August 2018, Torres was loaned to Málaga for one year. He only missed four Segunda División games during his spell as the side reached the promotion play-offs and, subsequently, was recalled by his parent club.

Torres subsequently cemented his place in Villarreal's starting XI, playing every minute in the league. In October 2019, he was rewarded with a contract extension until 2024, and the same month scored his first goal in the Spanish top tier, opening a 2–1 loss at Osasuna.

Torres contributed nine appearances in the 2020–21 UEFA Europa League as the tournament ended in a first-ever European victory for the team, under manager Unai Emery. This included the final, a penalty shootout win over Manchester United after a 1–1 draw.

=== Aston Villa ===
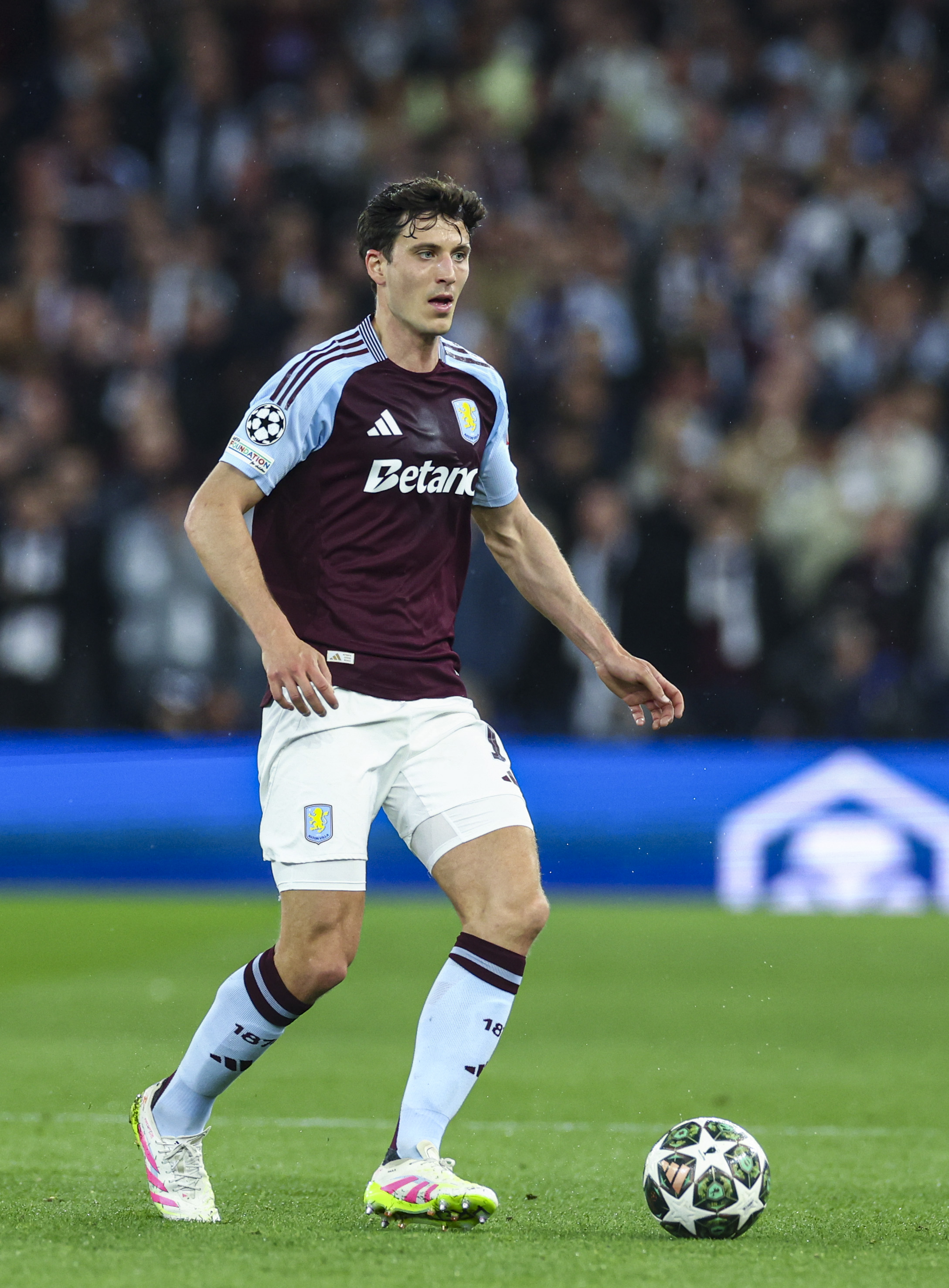
Torres with Aston Villa in 2025

On 12 July 2023, Torres signed for Aston Villa for a reported fee of £31.5 million, rejoining coach Emery. He made his Premier League debut on 12 August, replacing the injured Tyrone Mings during the first half of an eventual 5–1 loss at Newcastle United. He scored his first goal on 8 October, in a 1–1 away draw against Wolverhampton Wanderers.

Torres endured a lengthy spell on the sidelines in 2024–25, due to muscular problems and a foot injury. However, he played a very important role as the Villans won the following season's Europa League, making 12 appearances during the run while totalling 1,022 minutes.

== International career ==
Torres got his first call up for the Spain national team by Robert Moreno on 4 October 2019, for UEFA Euro 2020 qualifiers against Norway and Sweden. He did not debut until 15 November when he scored in a 7–0 rout of Malta for the already qualified hosts, within a minute of replacing Sergio Ramos; Dani Olmo also scored on his first cap in that game, the first time that two Spaniards did so in exactly 30 years.

Torres was included in Luis Enrique's 24-man squad for the finals. He was also selected for the Olympic team that won a silver medal at the Summer Olympics in Tokyo.

== Career statistics ==
=== Club ===
As of match played 21 November 2026

Appearances and goals by club, season and competition
Club	Season	League			National cup (Note: Includes Copa del Rey, FA Cup)		League cup (Note: Includes EFL Cup)		Europe		Other		Total	
Club	Season	Division	Apps	Goals	Apps	Goals	Apps	Goals	Apps	Goals	Apps	Goals	Apps	Goals
Villarreal B	2016–17	Segunda División B	34	2	—		—		—		—		34	2
Villarreal B	2017–18	Segunda División B	25	0	—		—		—		6 (Note: Appearances in Segunda División B promotion play-offs)	0	31	0
Villarreal B	Total		59	2	—		—		—		6	0	65	2
Villarreal	2016–17	La Liga	0	0	1	0	—		0	0	—		1	0
Villarreal	2017–18	La Liga	2	0	3	0	—		1 (Note: Appearances in UEFA Europa League)	0	—		6	0
Villarreal	2019–20	La Liga	34	2	2	0	—		—		—		36	2
Villarreal	2020–21	La Liga	33	2	2	0	—		9	1	—		44	3
Villarreal	2021–22	La Liga	33	5	1	0	—		12 (Note: Appearances in UEFA Champions League)	1	1 (Note: Appearance in UEFA Super Cup)	0	47	6
Villarreal	2022–23	La Liga	34	1	2	0	—		3 (Note: Appearances in UEFA Europa Conference League)	0	—		39	1
Villarreal	Total		136	10	11	0	—		25	2	1	0	173	12
Málaga (loan)	2018–19	Segunda División	38	1	0	0	—		—		2 (Note: Appearances in La Liga play-offs)	0	40	1
Aston Villa	2023–24	Premier League	29	2	0	0	1	0	9	0	—		39	2
Aston Villa	2024–25	Premier League	24	0	1	0	0	0	9	0	—		34	0
Aston Villa	2025–26	Premier League	21	0	2	0	1	0	12	0	—		36	0
Aston Villa	2026–27	Premier League	8	0	0	0	0	0	4	0	1	0	13	0
Aston Villa	Total		82	2	3	0	2	0	34	0	1	0	122	2
Career total			315	15	14	0	2	0	59	2	10	0	400	17

=== International ===
Appearances and goals by national team and year
National team	Year	Apps	Goals
Spain	2019	1	1
Spain	2020	6	0
Spain	2021	9	0
Spain	2022	7	0
Spain	2023	1	0
Total		24	1

Spain score listed first, score column indicates score after each Torres goal.

List of international goals scored by Pau Torres
No.	Date	Venue	Opponent	Score	Result	Competition
1	15 November 2019	Estadio Ramón de Carranza, Cádiz, Spain	Malta	3–0	7–0	UEFA Euro 2020 qualifying

== Honours ==
Villarreal

- UEFA Europa League: 2020–21

Aston Villa

- UEFA Europa League: 2025–26

Spain U23

- Summer Olympics silver medal: 2020

Spain

- UEFA Nations League runner up: 2020–21

Individual

- UEFA Europa League Squad of the Season: 2020–21
