= 2025 UEFA Nations League Finals squads =

Team squads of 2025 Nations League Finals

The 2025 UEFA Nations League Finals was an international football tournament being held in Germany from 4 to 8 June 2025. The four national teams involved in the tournament were required to register a squad of between 23 and 26 players – of which three have to be goalkeepers – by 28 May 2025, seven days prior to the opening match of the tournament. Only players in these squads were eligible to take part in the tournament. In the event that a player on the submitted squad list suffered from an injury or illness prior to his team's first match of the tournament, that player could be replaced, provided that the team doctor and a doctor from the UEFA Medical Committee both confirmed that the injury or illness was severe enough to prevent the player from participating in the tournament. Should a goalkeeper suffered from an injury or illness after his team's first match of the tournament, he could still be replaced prior to the second match, even if the other goalkeepers from the squad were still available.

The position listed for each player is per the official squad lists published by UEFA. The age listed for each player is as of 4 June 2025, the first day of the tournament. The numbers of caps and goals listed for each player do not include any matches played after the start of the tournament. The club listed is the club for which the player last played a competitive match prior to the tournament. The nationality for each club reflects the national association (not the league) to which the club is affiliated. A flag is included for coaches who were of a different nationality to their team.

== France ==
Manager: Didier Deschamps

France announced a 25-man squad on 21 May 2025. During the tournament, Ousmane Dembélé, Bradley Barcola and Clément Lenglet left the squad prematurely due to injuries.

| No. | Pos. | Player | Date of birth (age) | Caps | Goals | Club |
|---|---|---|---|---|---|---|
| 1 | GK | Brice Samba | 25 April 1994 (aged 31) | 3 | 0 | (French Football Federation) Rennes |
| 2 | DF | Benjamin Pavard | 28 March 1996 (aged 29) | 55 | 5 | (Italian Football Federation) Internazionale |
| 3 | DF | Lucas Digne | 20 July 1993 (aged 31) | 51 | 0 | (The Football Association) Aston Villa |
| 4 | DF | Loïc Badé | 11 April 2000 (aged 25) | 0 | 0 | (Royal Spanish Football Federation) Sevilla |
| 5 | DF | Clément Lenglet | 17 June 1995 (aged 29) | 15 | 1 | (Royal Spanish Football Federation) Atlético Madrid |
| 6 | MF | Mattéo Guendouzi | 14 April 1999 (aged 26) | 13 | 2 | (Italian Football Federation) Lazio |
| 7 | FW | Ousmane Dembélé | 15 May 1997 (aged 28) | 55 | 7 | (French Football Federation) Paris Saint-Germain |
| 8 | MF | Aurélien Tchouaméni | 27 January 2000 (aged 25) | 40 | 3 | (Royal Spanish Football Federation) Real Madrid |
| 9 | FW | Marcus Thuram | 6 August 1997 (aged 27) | 29 | 2 | (Italian Football Federation) Internazionale |
| 10 | FW | Kylian Mbappé (captain) | 20 December 1998 (aged 26) | 88 | 48 | (Royal Spanish Football Federation) Real Madrid |
| 11 | MF | Michael Olise | 12 December 2001 (aged 23) | 6 | 1 | (German Football Association) Bayern Munich |
| 12 | FW | Randal Kolo Muani | 5 December 1998 (aged 26) | 29 | 8 | (Italian Football Federation) Juventus |
| 13 | MF | Manu Koné | 17 May 2001 (aged 24) | 6 | 0 | (Italian Football Federation) Roma |
| 14 | MF | Adrien Rabiot | 3 April 1995 (aged 30) | 51 | 6 | (French Football Federation) Marseille |
| 15 | DF | Ibrahima Konaté | 25 May 1999 (aged 26) | 22 | 0 | (The Football Association) Liverpool |
| 16 | GK | Mike Maignan | 3 July 1995 (aged 29) | 30 | 0 | (Italian Football Federation) Milan |
| 17 | DF | Malo Gusto | 19 May 2003 (aged 22) | 1 | 0 | (The Football Association) Chelsea |
| 18 | MF | Warren Zaïre-Emery | 8 March 2006 (aged 19) | 7 | 1 | (French Football Federation) Paris Saint-Germain |
| 19 | DF | Pierre Kalulu | 5 June 2000 (aged 24) | 0 | 0 | (Italian Football Federation) Juventus |
| 20 | FW | Bradley Barcola | 2 September 2002 (aged 22) | 13 | 2 | (French Football Federation) Paris Saint-Germain |
| 21 | DF | Lucas Hernandez | 14 February 1996 (aged 29) | 37 | 0 | (French Football Federation) Paris Saint-Germain |
| 22 | DF | Théo Hernandez | 6 October 1997 (aged 27) | 37 | 2 | (Italian Football Federation) Milan |
| 23 | GK | Lucas Chevalier | 6 November 2001 (aged 23) | 0 | 0 | (French Football Federation) Lille |
| 24 | FW | Désiré Doué | 3 June 2005 (aged 20) | 1 | 0 | (French Football Federation) Paris Saint-Germain |
| 25 | FW | Rayan Cherki | 17 August 2003 (aged 21) | 0 | 0 | (French Football Federation) Lyon |

== Germany ==
Manager: Julian Nagelsmann

Germany announced a 26-man squad on 22 May 2025. On 27 May, Angelo Stiller withdrew from the squad due to injury and was replaced by Jonathan Burkardt. On 31 May, Nadiem Amiri withdrew from the squad due to injury. On 1 June, Yann Aurel Bisseck and Jonathan Burkardt withdrew from the squad due to injuries, with the former being replaced by Thilo Kehrer.

| No. | Pos. | Player | Date of birth (age) | Caps | Goals | Club |
|---|---|---|---|---|---|---|
| 1 | GK | Marc-André ter Stegen | 30 April 1992 (aged 33) | 42 | 0 | (Royal Spanish Football Federation) Barcelona |
| 2 | DF | Waldemar Anton | 20 July 1996 (aged 28) | 7 | 0 | (German Football Association) Borussia Dortmund |
| 3 | DF | Robin Koch | 17 July 1996 (aged 28) | 12 | 0 | (German Football Association) Eintracht Frankfurt |
| 4 | DF | Jonathan Tah | 11 February 1996 (aged 29) | 35 | 0 | (German Football Association) Bayer Leverkusen |
| 5 | MF | Pascal Groß | 15 June 1991 (aged 33) | 14 | 1 | (German Football Association) Borussia Dortmund |
| 6 | DF | Joshua Kimmich (captain) | 8 February 1995 (aged 30) | 99 | 8 | (German Football Association) Bayern Munich |
| 7 | MF | Felix Nmecha | 10 October 2000 (aged 24) | 3 | 1 | (German Football Association) Borussia Dortmund |
| 8 | MF | Leon Goretzka | 6 February 1995 (aged 30) | 59 | 15 | (German Football Association) Bayern Munich |
| 9 | FW | Niclas Füllkrug | 9 February 1993 (aged 32) | 22 | 14 | (The Football Association) West Ham United |
| 11 | FW | Nick Woltemade | 14 February 2002 (aged 23) | 0 | 0 | (German Football Association) VfB Stuttgart |
| 12 | GK | Oliver Baumann | 2 June 1990 (aged 35) | 4 | 0 | (German Football Association) TSG Hoffenheim |
| 13 | FW | Deniz Undav | 19 July 1996 (aged 28) | 5 | 3 | (German Football Association) VfB Stuttgart |
| 14 | FW | Karim Adeyemi | 18 January 2002 (aged 23) | 6 | 1 | (German Football Association) Borussia Dortmund |
| 15 | DF | Thilo Kehrer | 21 September 1996 (aged 28) | 27 | 0 | (French Football Federation) Monaco |
| 17 | MF | Florian Wirtz | 3 May 2003 (aged 22) | 29 | 6 | (German Football Association) Bayer Leverkusen |
| 18 | DF | Maximilian Mittelstädt | 18 March 1997 (aged 28) | 12 | 1 | (German Football Association) VfB Stuttgart |
| 19 | MF | Leroy Sané | 11 January 1996 (aged 29) | 69 | 14 | (German Football Association) Bayern Munich |
| 20 | MF | Serge Gnabry | 14 July 1995 (aged 29) | 49 | 22 | (German Football Association) Bayern Munich |
| 21 | MF | Robin Gosens | 5 July 1994 (aged 30) | 23 | 2 | (Italian Football Federation) Fiorentina |
| 22 | DF | David Raum | 22 April 1998 (aged 27) | 27 | 0 | (German Football Association) RB Leipzig |
| 23 | DF | Robert Andrich | 22 September 1994 (aged 30) | 18 | 0 | (German Football Association) Bayer Leverkusen |
| 24 | GK | Alexander Nübel | 30 September 1996 (aged 28) | 2 | 0 | (German Football Association) VfB Stuttgart |
| 25 | MF | Aleksandar Pavlović | 3 May 2004 (aged 21) | 4 | 1 | (German Football Association) Bayern Munich |
| 26 | MF | Tom Bischof | 28 June 2005 (aged 19) | 0 | 0 | (German Football Association) TSG Hoffenheim |

== Portugal ==
Manager: (Spain) Roberto Martínez

Portugal announced a 27-man squad on 20 May 2025. Nuno Tavares was omitted from the final squad.

| No. | Pos. | Player | Date of birth (age) | Caps | Goals | Club |
|---|---|---|---|---|---|---|
| 1 | GK | Diogo Costa | 19 September 1999 (aged 25) | 34 | 0 | (Portuguese Football Federation) Porto |
| 2 | DF | Nélson Semedo | 16 November 1993 (aged 31) | 42 | 0 | (The Football Association) Wolverhampton Wanderers |
| 3 | DF | Rúben Dias | 14 May 1997 (aged 28) | 66 | 3 | (The Football Association) Manchester City |
| 4 | DF | António Silva | 30 October 2003 (aged 21) | 17 | 0 | (Portuguese Football Federation) Benfica |
| 5 | DF | Diogo Dalot | 18 March 1999 (aged 26) | 29 | 3 | (The Football Association) Manchester United |
| 6 | MF | João Palhinha | 9 July 1995 (aged 29) | 33 | 2 | (German Football Association) Bayern Munich |
| 7 | FW | Cristiano Ronaldo (captain) | 5 February 1985 (aged 40) | 219 | 136 | (Saudi Arabian Football Federation) Al-Nassr |
| 8 | MF | Bruno Fernandes | 8 September 1994 (aged 30) | 78 | 25 | (The Football Association) Manchester United |
| 9 | FW | Gonçalo Ramos | 20 June 2001 (aged 23) | 15 | 9 | (French Football Federation) Paris Saint-Germain |
| 10 | MF | Bernardo Silva | 10 August 1994 (aged 30) | 100 | 13 | (The Football Association) Manchester City |
| 11 | FW | João Félix | 10 November 1999 (aged 25) | 45 | 9 | (Italian Football Federation) Milan |
| 12 | GK | José Sá | 17 January 1993 (aged 32) | 3 | 0 | (The Football Association) Wolverhampton Wanderers |
| 13 | DF | Renato Veiga | 29 July 2003 (aged 21) | 4 | 0 | (Italian Football Federation) Juventus |
| 14 | DF | Gonçalo Inácio | 25 August 2001 (aged 23) | 14 | 2 | (Portuguese Football Federation) Sporting CP |
| 15 | MF | João Neves | 27 September 2004 (aged 20) | 14 | 0 | (French Football Federation) Paris Saint-Germain |
| 16 | FW | Francisco Trincão | 29 December 1999 (aged 25) | 10 | 2 | (Portuguese Football Federation) Sporting CP |
| 17 | FW | Rafael Leão | 10 June 1999 (aged 25) | 39 | 5 | (Italian Football Federation) Milan |
| 18 | MF | Rúben Neves | 13 March 1997 (aged 28) | 56 | 0 | (Saudi Arabian Football Federation) Al-Hilal |
| 19 | MF | Pedro Gonçalves | 28 June 1998 (aged 26) | 3 | 0 | (Portuguese Football Federation) Sporting CP |
| 20 | FW | Pedro Neto | 9 March 2000 (aged 25) | 15 | 2 | (The Football Association) Chelsea |
| 21 | FW | Diogo Jota | 4 December 1996 (aged 28) | 47 | 14 | (The Football Association) Liverpool |
| 22 | GK | Rui Silva | 7 February 1994 (aged 31) | 1 | 0 | (Portuguese Football Federation) Sporting CP |
| 23 | MF | Vitinha | 13 February 2000 (aged 25) | 27 | 0 | (French Football Federation) Paris Saint-Germain |
| 24 | MF | Rodrigo Mora | 5 May 2007 (aged 18) | 0 | 0 | (Portuguese Football Federation) Porto |
| 25 | DF | Nuno Mendes | 19 June 2002 (aged 22) | 35 | 0 | (French Football Federation) Paris Saint-Germain |
| 26 | FW | Francisco Conceição | 14 December 2002 (aged 22) | 9 | 1 | (Italian Football Federation) Juventus |

== Spain ==
Manager: Luis de la Fuente

Spain announced a 26-man squad on 26 May 2025.

| No. | Pos. | Player | Date of birth (age) | Caps | Goals | Club |
|---|---|---|---|---|---|---|
| 1 | GK | David Raya | 15 September 1995 (aged 29) | 11 | 0 | (The Football Association) Arsenal |
| 2 | DF | Pedro Porro | 13 September 1999 (aged 25) | 8 | 0 | (The Football Association) Tottenham Hotspur |
| 3 | DF | Robin Le Normand | 11 November 1996 (aged 28) | 21 | 1 | (Royal Spanish Football Federation) Atlético Madrid |
| 4 | DF | Pau Cubarsí | 22 January 2007 (aged 18) | 6 | 0 | (Royal Spanish Football Federation) Barcelona |
| 5 | DF | Daniel Vivian | 5 July 1999 (aged 25) | 8 | 0 | (Royal Spanish Football Federation) Athletic Bilbao |
| 6 | MF | Mikel Merino | 22 June 1996 (aged 28) | 33 | 3 | (The Football Association) Arsenal |
| 7 | FW | Álvaro Morata (captain) | 23 October 1992 (aged 32) | 85 | 37 | (Turkish Football Federation) Galatasaray |
| 8 | MF | Fabián Ruiz | 3 April 1996 (aged 29) | 37 | 6 | (French Football Federation) Paris Saint-Germain |
| 9 | MF | Gavi | 5 August 2004 (aged 20) | 27 | 5 | (Royal Spanish Football Federation) Barcelona |
| 10 | FW | Dani Olmo | 7 May 1998 (aged 27) | 43 | 11 | (Royal Spanish Football Federation) Barcelona |
| 11 | MF | Nico Williams | 12 July 2002 (aged 22) | 26 | 5 | (Royal Spanish Football Federation) Athletic Bilbao |
| 12 | DF | Dean Huijsen | 14 April 2005 (aged 20) | 2 | 0 | (The Football Association) Bournemouth |
| 13 | GK | Álex Remiro | 24 March 1995 (aged 30) | 2 | 0 | (Royal Spanish Football Federation) Real Sociedad |
| 14 | DF | Óscar Mingueza | 13 May 1999 (aged 26) | 3 | 0 | (Royal Spanish Football Federation) Celta Vigo |
| 15 | FW | Yéremy Pino | 20 October 2002 (aged 22) | 14 | 3 | (Royal Spanish Football Federation) Villarreal |
| 16 | MF | Álex Baena | 20 July 2001 (aged 23) | 9 | 2 | (Royal Spanish Football Federation) Villarreal |
| 17 | DF | Álex Grimaldo | 20 September 1995 (aged 29) | 10 | 0 | (German Football Association) Bayer Leverkusen |
| 18 | MF | Martín Zubimendi | 2 February 1999 (aged 26) | 17 | 1 | (Royal Spanish Football Federation) Real Sociedad |
| 19 | FW | Lamine Yamal | 13 July 2007 (aged 17) | 19 | 4 | (Royal Spanish Football Federation) Barcelona |
| 20 | MF | Pedri | 25 November 2002 (aged 22) | 32 | 2 | (Royal Spanish Football Federation) Barcelona |
| 21 | MF | Mikel Oyarzabal | 21 April 1997 (aged 28) | 43 | 15 | (Royal Spanish Football Federation) Real Sociedad |
| 22 | MF | Isco | 21 April 1992 (aged 33) | 38 | 12 | (Royal Spanish Football Federation) Real Betis |
| 23 | GK | Unai Simón | 11 June 1997 (aged 27) | 48 | 0 | (Royal Spanish Football Federation) Athletic Bilbao |
| 24 | DF | Marc Cucurella | 22 July 1998 (aged 26) | 15 | 0 | (The Football Association) Chelsea |
| 25 | FW | Fermín López | 11 May 2003 (aged 22) | 2 | 0 | (Royal Spanish Football Federation) Barcelona |
| 26 | FW | Samu Aghehowa | 5 May 2004 (aged 21) | 1 | 0 | (Portuguese Football Federation) Porto |
