= Álex Baena =

Spanish footballer (born 2001)

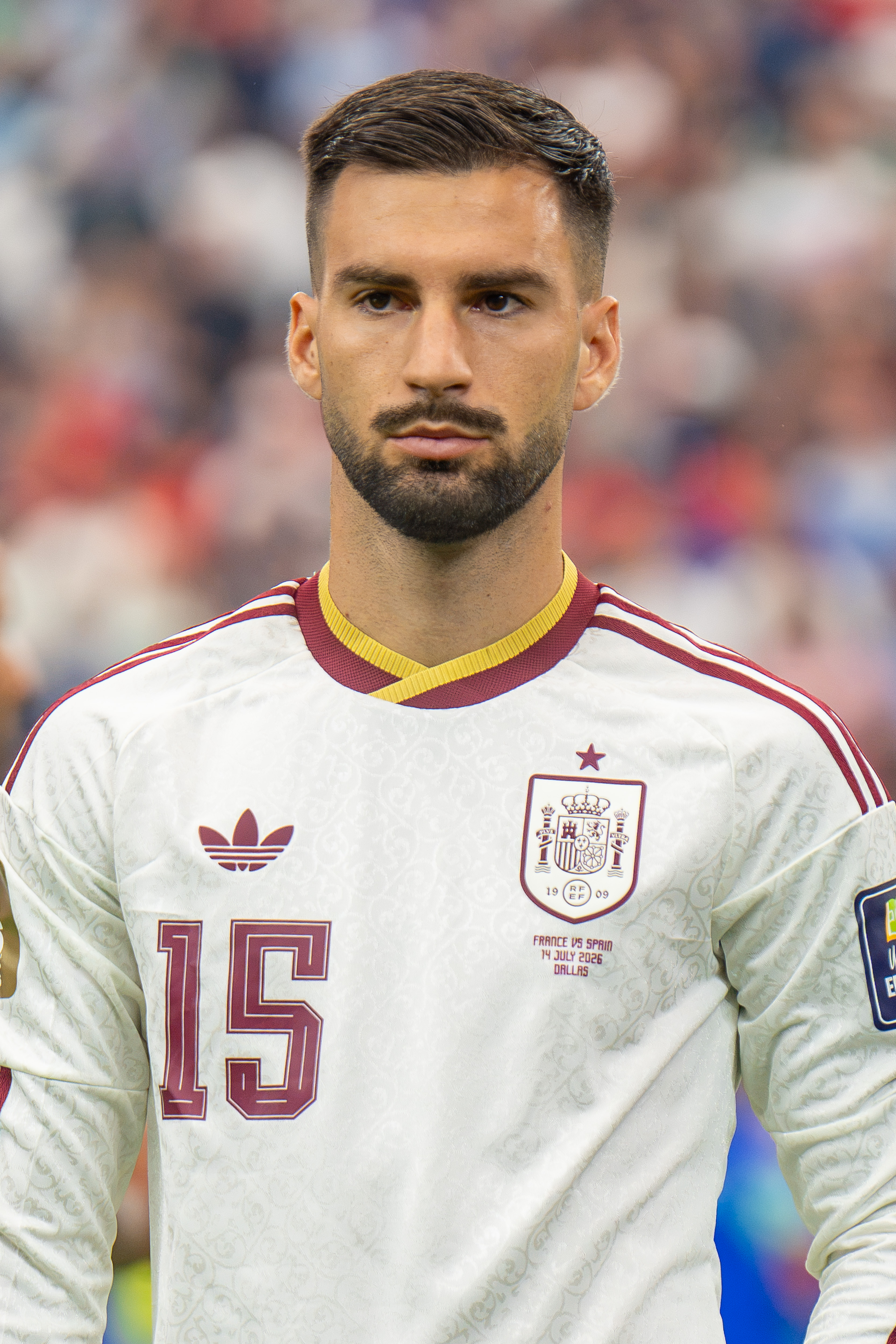
- Baena with Spain in 2026

Personal information
- Full name: Alejandro Baena Rodríguez
- Date of birth: 20 July 2001 (age 25)
- Place of birth: Roquetas de Mar, Spain
- Height: 1.74 m (5 ft 9 in)
- Positions: Left midfielder; central midfielder; attacking midfielder

Team information
- Current team: Atlético Madrid
- Number: 10

Youth career
- 2007–2011: Roquetas
- 2011–2019: Villarreal

Senior career*
Years	Team	Apps	(Gls)
2018–2019	Villarreal C	1	(0)
2019–2020	Villarreal B	23	(0)
2020–2025	Villarreal	108	(15)
2021–2022	→ Girona (loan)	38	(5)
2025–	Atlético Madrid	40	(8)

International career^{‡}
2017	Spain U16	3	(2)
2017–2018	Spain U17	11	(3)
2018–2019	Spain U18	10	(3)
2019–2020	Spain U19	7	(0)
2019	Spain U20	5	(1)
2022–2023	Spain U21	12	(2)
2024	Spain U23	5	(2)
2023–	Spain	30	(5)
Medal record
Men's football
Representing Spain
FIFA World Cup
Winner	2026 Canada–Mexico–US
UEFA European Championship
Winner	2024 Germany	Team
UEFA Nations League
Runner-up	2025 Germany	Team
Olympic Games
Gold medal – first place	2024 Paris	Team
UEFA European Under-21 Championship
Runner-up	2023 Georgia–Romania	Team
- * Club domestic league appearances and goals as of 22 November 2026 ‡ National team caps and goals as of 15 November 2026

Alejandro "Álex" Baena Rodríguez (born 20 July 2001) is a Spanish professional footballer who plays as a left midfielder or attacking midfielder for La Liga club Atlético Madrid and the Spain national team. He was part of the team that won the 2026 FIFA World Cup.

== Club career ==
=== Villarreal ===
Baena was born in Roquetas de Mar, and joined Villarreal's youth setup in 2011, from Roquetas. He made his senior debut with the C-team on 21 December 2018, coming on as a second-half substitute in a 2–0 Tercera División home victory against Rayo Ibense.

Ahead of the 2019–20 season, Baena was assigned to the reserves in Segunda División B, debuting as a starter on 14 September 2019 in a 3–0 victory against Llagostera. On 13 July of the following year, he made his first-team league debut, replacing fellow youth graduate Manu Trigueros in a 1–2 home loss against Real Sociedad.

Baena scored his first professional goal on 5 November 2020, netting his club's third in a 4–0 UEFA Europa League home routing of Maccabi Tel Aviv. Seven days later, he renewed his contract until 2025. On 19 August 2021, Baena moved to Segunda División club Girona on a one-year loan. On 26 August 2022, he and teammate Nicolas Jackson were fully promoted to the main squad. In the 2023–24 season, he became the top assist provider in La Liga with 14 assists.

=== Atlético Madrid ===
On 2 July 2025, Baena joined Atlético Madrid, signing a five-year-contract. Later that year, on 27 October, he scored his first goal for the club in a 2–0 away win over Real Betis.

== International career ==
Baena playing for Spain at the 2026 FIFA World Cup

Baena represented Spain at under-16, under-17, under-18, under-19 and under-20 levels, appearing in the 2018 UEFA European Under-17 Championship. He also called up to the under-21 team for the 2023 UEFA European Under-21 Championship where Spain finished as runners-up.

In August 2023, Baena received his first call-up to the Spain senior national team by head coach Luis de la Fuente, for two UEFA Euro 2024 qualifying matches against Georgia and Cyprus. He went on to score his first goal for Spain on his debut against the latter opponent in a 6–0 victory. In May 2024, Baena was named in the 26-man squad for the UEFA Euro 2024.

In July 2024, Baena was included in the Spain U23 squad for the 2024 Summer Olympics in Paris. He scored a goal from a free kick in the gold medal match against France, where Spain won by 5–3 after extra time.

On 25 May 2026, Baena was named in Spain's squad for the 2026 FIFA World Cup. A month later, on 26 June, he scored the only goal and was named Man of the Match in a 1–0 victory over Uruguay, helping his country secure a place in the knockout stage. He started the World Cup final, which ended in a 1–0 victory over Argentina after extra time. With the triumph, he became the first player to win the FIFA World Cup, the UEFA European Championship, and an Olympic gold medal.

== Career statistics ==
=== Club ===
As of match played 22 November 2026

Appearances and goals by club, season and competition
Club	Season	League			Copa del Rey		Europe		Other		Total	
Club	Season	Division	Apps	Goals	Apps	Goals	Apps	Goals	Apps	Goals	Apps	Goals
Villarreal C	2019–20	Tercera División	1	0	—		—		—		1	0
Villarreal B	2019–20	Segunda División B	23	0	—		—		—		23	0
Villarreal	2019–20	La Liga	1	0	1	0	—		—		2	0
Villarreal	2020–21	La Liga	6	0	5	0	9 (Note: Appearances in UEFA Europa League)	2	—		20	2
Villarreal	2022–23	La Liga	35	6	4	2	9 (Note: Appearances in UEFA Europa Conference League)	4	—		48	12
Villarreal	2023–24	La Liga	34	2	3	1	8	2	—		45	5
Villarreal	2024–25	La Liga	32	7	1	0	—		—		33	7
Villarreal	Total		108	15	14	3	26	8	—		148	26
Girona (loan)	2021–22	Segunda División	38	5	3	0	—		4 (Note: Appearances in Segunda División promotion play-offs)	0	45	5
Atlético Madrid	2025–26	La Liga	27	2	5	0	13 (Note: Appearances in UEFA Champions League)	0	1 (Note: Appearance in Supercopa de España)	0	46	2
Atlético Madrid	2026–27	La Liga	13	6	0	0	4	0	0	0	17	6
Atlético Madrid	Total		40	8	5	0	17	0	1	0	63	8
Career total			210	28	22	3	43	8	5	0	280	39

=== International ===
As of match played 15 November 2026

Appearances and goals by national team and year
National team	Year	Apps	Goals
Spain	2023	1	1
Spain	2024	7	1
Spain	2025	6	0
Spain	2026	16	3
Total		30	5

As of match played 12 November 2026
Spain score listed first, score column indicates score after each Baena goal.

List of international goals scored by Álex Baena
No.	Date	Venue	Cap	Opponent	Score	Result	Competition
1	12 September 2023	Nuevo Los Cármenes, Granada, Spain	1	Cyprus	5–0	6–0	UEFA Euro 2024 qualifying
2	15 October 2024	Estadio Nuevo Arcángel, Córdoba, Spain	7	Serbia	3–0	3–0	2024–25 UEFA Nations League A
3	26 June 2026	Estadio Akron, Zapopan, Mexico	19	Uruguay	1–0	1–0	2026 FIFA World Cup
4	26 September 2026	Wembley Stadium, London, England	25	England	2–2	3–2	2026–27 UEFA Nations League A
5	12 November 2026	Fortuna Arena, Prague, Czech Republic	29	Czech Republic	1–0	2–0	2026–27 UEFA Nations League A

== Honours ==
Villarreal

- UEFA Europa League: 2020–21

Atlético Madrid

- Copa del Rey runner-up: 2025–26

Spain U21

- UEFA European Under-21 Championship runner-up: 2023

Spain U23

- Summer Olympics gold medal: 2024

Spain

- FIFA World Cup: 2026
- UEFA European Championship: 2024
- UEFA Nations League runner-up: 2024–25

Individual

- La Liga top assist provider: 2023–24
- La Liga Team of the Season: 2024–25
