= Ramon Abatti =

Brazilian football referee

- Full name: Ramon Abatti Abel
- Born: 18 September 1989 (age 37); Araranguá, Brazil

Domestic
Years	League	Role
2012–	FCF	Referee
2020–	CBF	Referee

International
Years	League	Role
2021–	FIFA	Referee

Ramon Abatti Abel (born 18 September 1989) is a Brazilian football referee. He was appointed to the official list of football referees for the 2024 Summer Olympics in France.

== Career ==
Born in Santa Catarina, Abatti has refereed matches for the local federation since 2012, joining the CBF in 2020 and CONMEBOL/FIFA in 2021. His first international performance was in the 2022 FIFA World Cup.

Over the years he has been involved in some controversies, such as the refereeing of the 2023 Campeonato Brasileiro Série A match between Fluminense and Corinthians, and the final of the 2024 Campeonato Catarinense tournament. On 28 October 2024 Abatti was suspended by the CBF after errors in the Palmeiras x Fortaleza match.

He was the referee of the final for the gold medal between Spain and France at the 2024 Olympics in Parc des Princes.

On 6 October 2025, Abatti was again suspended due to errors in the 2025 Campeonato Brasileiro Série A match São Paulo vs. Palmeiras.

Abatti was selected as a referee for the 2026 FIFA World Cup. He was appointed two group stage match between Belgium and Egypt and also Switzerland and Canada.

Sporting positions (Brazil) Ramon Abatti
Preceded by 2020 (Australia) Chris Beath	2024 Men's Olympic Football Tournament Final Referee	Succeeded by Incumbent
