= Diego Collado (footballer) =

Spanish footballer

Personal information
- Full name: Diego Collado Raya
- Date of birth: 9 January 2001 (age 25)
- Place of birth: Granada, Spain
- Height: 1.80 m (5 ft 11 in)
- Position: Winger

Team information
- Current team: Huesca

Youth career
- Ciudad de Granada
- Granada 74
- 2013–2017: Villarreal
- 2017–2018: Roda
- 2018–2019: Villarreal

Senior career*
Years	Team	Apps	(Gls)
2019	Villarreal C	3	(3)
2019–2024	Villarreal B	133	(16)
2023–2024	Villarreal	2	(0)
2024–2025	Gil Vicente	5	(0)
2025	→ Eldense (loan)	16	(2)
2025–2026	Cultural Leonesa	38	(3)
2026–	Huesca	0	(0)

International career
2019	Spain U19	2	(0)
2019	Spain U20	5	(2)
- * Club domestic league appearances and goals as of 31 May 2026

Diego Collado Raya (born 9 January 2001) is a Spanish footballer who plays as a left winger for SD Huesca. He joined Villarreal CF's youth setup at the age of 12.

== Club career ==
Collado was born in Granada, Andalusia, and joined Villarreal CF's youth setup at the age of 12, from Granada 74 CF. He made his senior debut with the C-team on 13 January 2019, coming on as a second-half substitute for Ipalibo Jack in a 1–0 Tercera División home loss against Atlético Saguntino.

On 22 August 2019, Collado signed a contract with the Yellow Submarine until 2023, and subsequently started to feature with the reserves in Segunda División B. He featured regularly with the B's during the 2021–22 season, as the team achieved promotion to Segunda División, and further extended his contract until 2025 on 2 August 2022.

Collado made his professional debut with the B-side on 14 August 2022, starting in a 2–0 away win over Racing de Santander. He scored his first professional goal on 17 September, netting his side's third in a 3–1 home win over CD Lugo.

Collado made his first team debut on 12 November 2022, as he started and scored the opener in a 9–0 away routing of CD Santa Amalia, for the season's Copa del Rey. His first La Liga appearance occurred the following 22 January, as he replaced Samuel Chukwueze late into a 1–0 home win over Girona FC.

On 26 June 2024, Collado moved abroad and signed a three-year contract with Portuguese Primeira Liga side Gil Vicente FC. On 27 December, after being rarely used, he returned to Spain and its second division after agreeing to a loan deal with CD Eldense.

On 1 August 2025, Collado joined Cultural y Deportiva Leonesa also in the second division, on a one-year contract. On 18 July of the following year, after suffering relegation, he agreed to a deal of the same duration with SD Huesca, also relegated to Primera Federación.
