= Pedri =

Spanish footballer (born 2002)

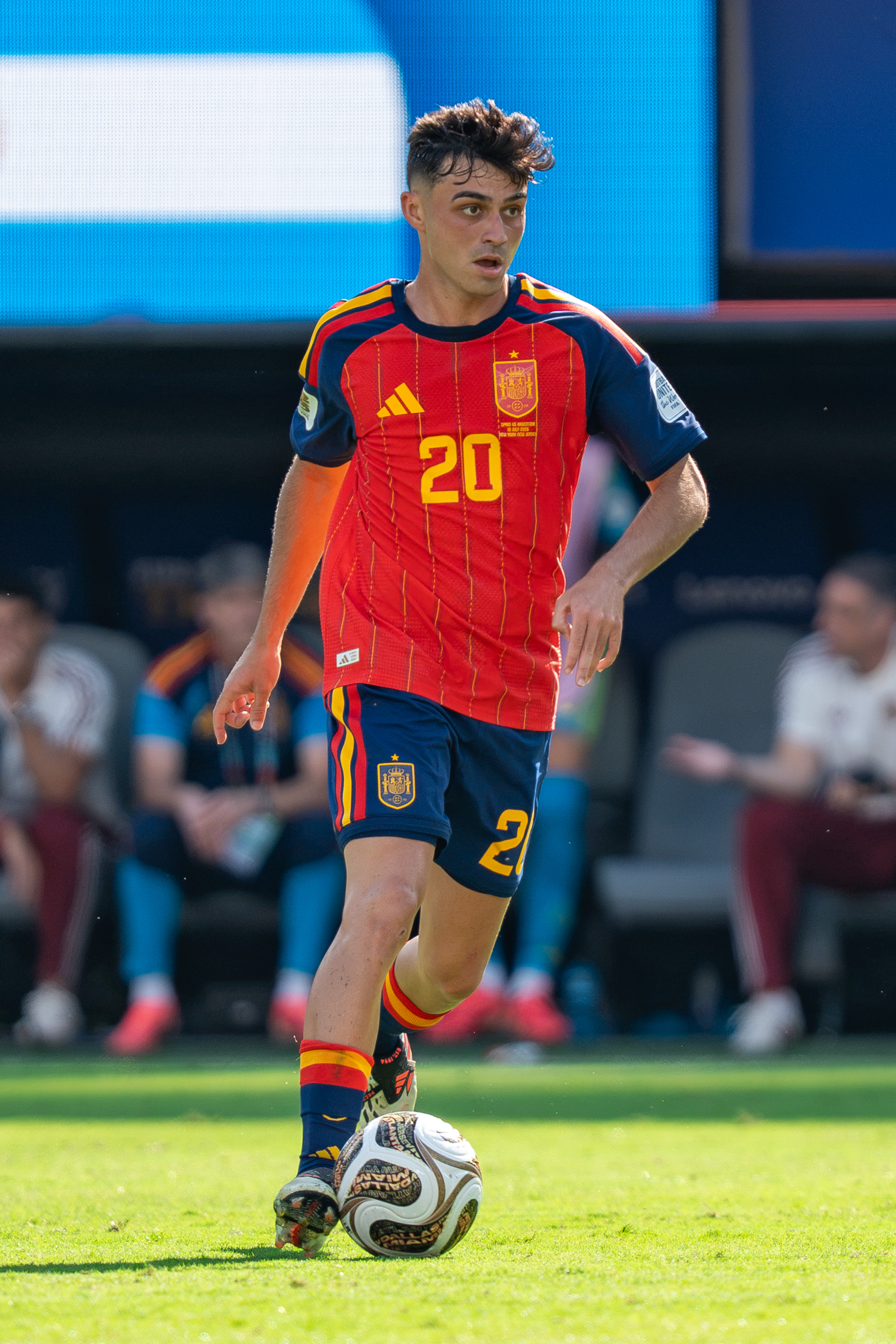
- Pedri with Spain in 2026

Personal information
- Full name: Pedro González López
- Date of birth: 25 November 2002 (age 23)
- Place of birth: Bajamar, Spain
- Height: 1.74 m (5 ft 9 in)
- Position: Midfielder

Team information
- Current team: Barcelona
- Number: 8

Youth career
- 2013–2015: Tegueste
- 2015–2018: Laguna
- 2018–2019: Las Palmas

Senior career*
Years	Team	Apps	(Gls)
2019–2020	Las Palmas	36	(4)
2020–	Barcelona	178	(23)

International career^{‡}
2019	Spain U17	5	(0)
2019	Spain U18	2	(1)
2020	Spain U19	1	(0)
2020	Spain U21	4	(0)
2021	Spain U23	7	(0)
2021–	Spain	55	(6)
Medal record
Men's football
Representing Spain
FIFA World Cup
Winner	2026 Canada–Mexico–US	Team
UEFA European Championship
Winner	2024 Germany	Team
Bronze medal – third place	2020 Europe	Team
UEFA Nations League
Runner-up	2025 Germany	Team
Olympic Games
Silver medal – second place	2020 Tokyo	Team
- * Club domestic league appearances and goals as of 21:09, 22 November 2026 (UTC) ‡ National team caps and goals as of 22:10, 15 November 2026 (UTC)

Pedro González López (born 25 November 2002), more commonly known as Pedri, is a Spanish professional footballer who plays as a midfielder for La Liga club Barcelona and the Spain national team. He is regarded as one of the best central midfielders in the world.

Coming through Las Palmas youth system, Pedri was promoted to the first team in August 2019 at the age of 16, before moving to Barcelona the following season. In his debut season, he played in almost every match as Barcelona won the Copa del Rey and he also won the Golden Boy and Kopa Trophy in 2021, presented to the best young player in the world. Despite facing various injury issues, he established himself as one of the most promising young players in the world, being integral to Barcelona winning a domestic treble of the La Liga title, the Copa del Rey, and the Supercopa de España in the 2024–25 season.

Pedri is a Spain international and former youth international. He made his debut for the senior national team in 2021 and has represented his country at two FIFA World Cups (2022 and 2026) and two UEFA European Championships (2020 and 2024), was named the Young Player of the Tournament at Euro 2020 and played an integral role in Spain's victory at Euro 2024. At the 2026 World Cup, he helped Spain win their second world title.

== Early life ==
Born in Bajamar, Tenerife, Canary Islands, Pedri's family moved to Tegueste, a nearby town, when he was three years old. His father, Fernando, played as a goalkeeper in his youth before taking over the family's restaurant. Pedri joined UD Tegueste, starting as a centre-back. At 13, Pedri signed for Laguna, where he played until 2018. Pedri was rejected by Real Madrid after a trial in 2018, where he was told he was not at their level. He was only able to train for a few days because of heavy snow, and based on those limited sessions, Real Madrid sent him home.

== Club career ==
=== Las Palmas ===
Pedri joined Las Palmas's youth setup in 2018 from Laguna. On 15 July 2019, aged only 16, he signed a professional four-year contract with the club, being promoted to the first team by manager Pepe Mel.

Pedri made his professional debut on 18 August 2019, aged only 16, by starting in a 1–0 home loss against Huesca in the Segunda División. He scored his first professional goal on 19 September, with the game's only goal in a home victory over Sporting Gijón and became the youngest goalscorer in Las Palmas history at 16 years, 9 months and 23 days of age.

=== Barcelona ===
==== 2019–22: Becoming a starter at Barcelona and Copa del Rey ====
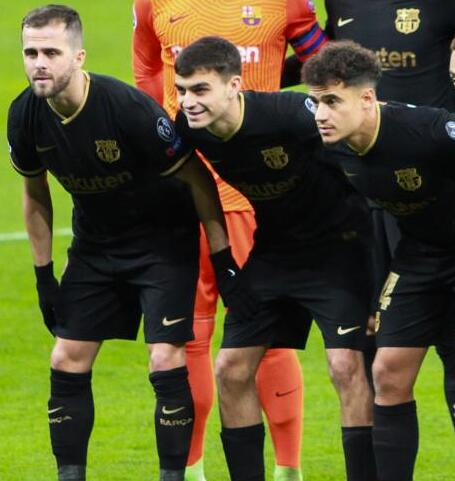
Pedri (centre) lining up for Barcelona in 2020

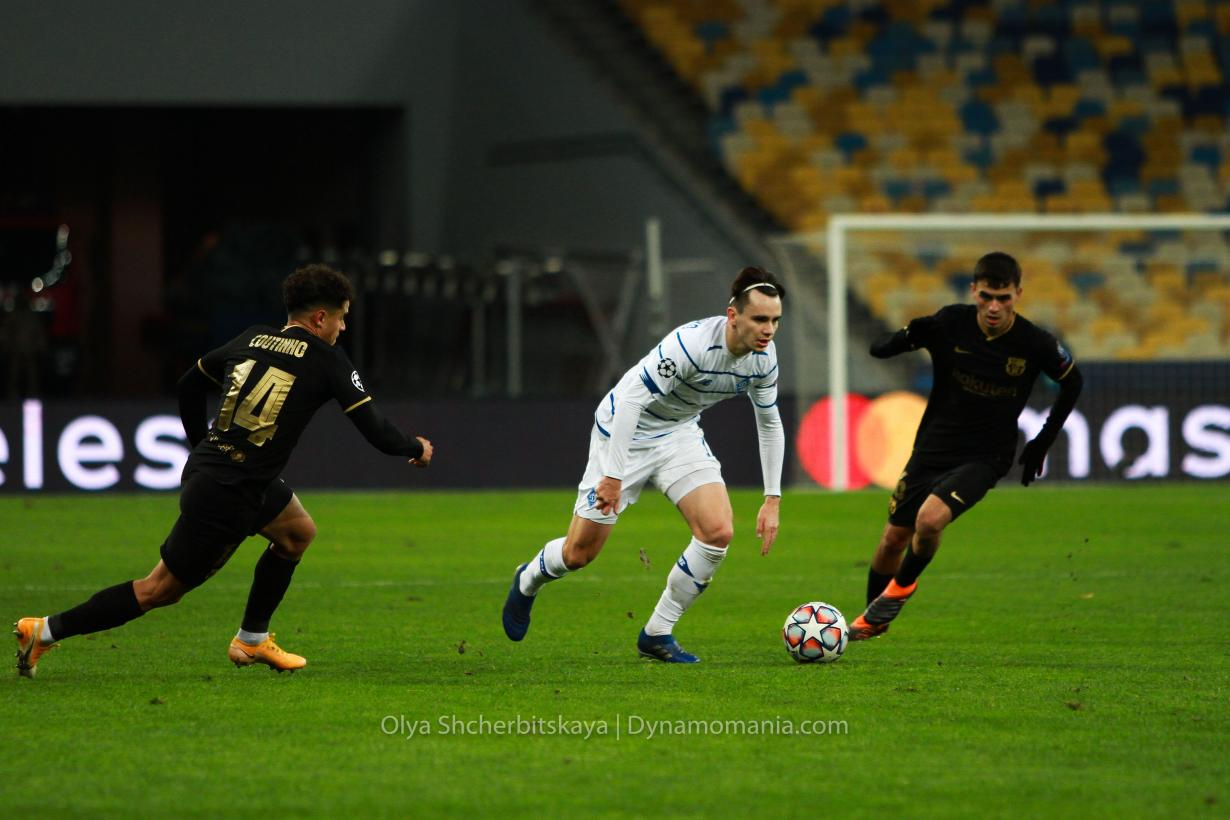
Pedri (right) chasing the ball in a match against Dynamo Kyiv in 2020.

On 2 September 2019, Barcelona reached an agreement with Las Palmas for the transfer of Pedri, effective as of the following 1 July 2020. The player agreed to a two-year contract with the Catalan club, who paid €5 million for the deal, which would increase as he fulfilled various clauses in his contract. The original framework built into his contract stated that he would not play for Barcelona B unless the reserve team achieved promotion to Segunda División. After Barça B failed to achieve promotion from the third tier, Pedri trained with the first team and convinced then-head coach Ronald Koeman during pre-season training sessions.

Assigned to the main squad for the 2020–21 season and with the number 16 shirt, Pedri made his debut on 27 September, replacing Philippe Coutinho in a 4–0 home win against Villarreal in La Liga. He received his first start on 17 October in a 1–0 away loss against Getafe. On 20 October, Pedri scored his first goal for the club on his UEFA Champions League debut, in a 5–1 win over Ferencváros in the group stage, after coming on as a substitute in the 61st minute for Ansu Fati. On 7 November, in a 5–2 home win over Real Betis, he scored his first goal in La Liga after an assist from Sergi Roberto.

On 6 January 2021, Pedri scored a headed goal against Athletic Bilbao and assisted Barcelona's second goal in a 3–2 win at San Mamés. On 17 April, Pedri won the first trophy of his senior career after Barcelona beat Athletic 4–0 in the Copa del Rey final. On 8 May, at 18 years and 164 days, Pedri made his 50th appearance for Barcelona in all competitions when he started in the 0–0 draw against Atlético Madrid at Camp Nou, thus becoming the second-youngest player to reach this milestone after Bojan Krkić, who was 18 years and 3 days when he reached 50 appearances. In the middle of October 2021 Pedri signed a new contract with Barcelona which contained a record €1 billion ($1.57 billion) release clause. On 22 November, Pedri won the Golden Boy award presented by Tuttosport for being the best player in European football under the age of 21. The following week he also received the 2021 Kopa Trophy, awarded by France Football, for being the best performing player in world football under the age of 21.

On 13 February 2022, Pedri scored the fastest Derbi Barceloní goal of the 21st century, clocking in at 75 seconds in a 2–2 draw against Espanyol. Later that year, on 14 April, Pedri picked up a hamstring injury during Barcelona's second legged quarter-final Europa League clash with Frankfurt, in which they were eliminated. Subsequently, it was announced that Pedri could miss the rest of the season.

==== 2022–Present: Sustained domestic success and injury issues ====
On 28 January 2023, Pedri made his 100th appearance in all competitions in a La Liga game against Girona. He was brought on in the 26th minute for injured Ousmane Dembélé and scored the only goal in the match. By the end of the 2022–23 season, he managed to achieve his first La Liga title with Barcelona under coach Xavi.

With the arrival of new manager Hansi Flick at Barcelona in the 2024–25 season, Pedri improved upon his fitness greatly, and enjoyed a strong and largely injury-free start to the season. On 21 January 2025, he assisted Eric García for Barcelona's equalizer against Benfica to make the game 4–4, with Barcelona eventually winning the game 5–4 and securing a top 8 spot in the league phase of the Champions League. Later that month, on 30 January, he extended his contract with the club until 2030. On 26 April, Pedri scored the first goal in the Copa del Rey final against Real Madrid and helped the team to win the game 3–2. After Lamine Yamal dribbled through Madrid's defense, he played a pass to Pedri who then scored from outside of the box, curling one into the top left corner and then Barcelona finished the season by lifting La Liga, the Copa del Rey and the Supercopa de España, along with a semi-final finish in the Champions League, with Pedri featuring regularly in the team across all competitions.

On 26 October, Pedri was sent off in a 2–1 defeat against Real Madrid after receiving two yellow cards, marking the first red card of his senior career. Three days later, Barcelona confirmed that he had suffered a tear to the distal biceps femoris muscle in his left thigh, which subsequently sidelined him. Up to that point, he had appeared in all of Barcelona’s matches during the season. He returned from injury on 29 November, featuring as a second-half substitute for Raphinha in Barcelona's 3–1 victory over Alavés. On 13 December, after starting in a 2–0 win against Osasuna, Pedri became Barcelona's youngest player to make 150 La Liga appearances, a record previously held by Lionel Messi.

== International career ==
=== Youth and early senior careers ===
On 21 August 2020, Pedri was called up to the Spain under-21 squad; he later made his debut on 3 September in a 1–0 away win over Macedonia in a qualifying match for the 2021 UEFA European Under-21 Championship.

In March 2021, Pedri received his first call-up to the Spain senior team from coach Luis Enrique ahead of the group stage of the 2022 FIFA World Cup qualification. He debuted the same year on 25 March against Greece.

=== Senior career ===
==== 2021–2023: First international tournaments ====
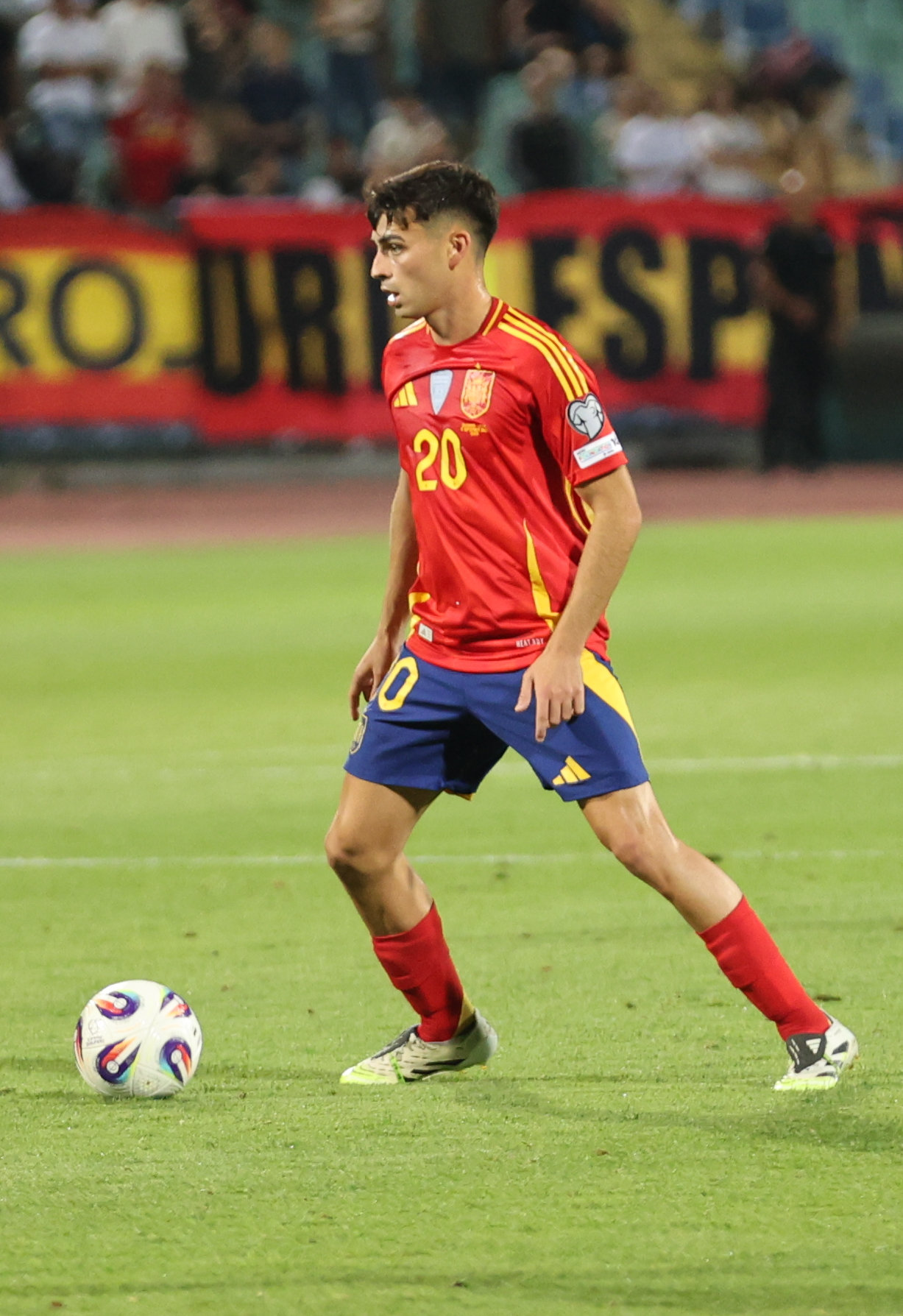
Pedri playing for Spain in 2025

On 24 May 2021, Pedri was included in Luis Enrique's 24-man squad for UEFA Euro 2020. On 14 June, he became the youngest player ever to represent Spain at the European Championships, when he started in the 0–0 draw against Sweden at the age of 18 years, 6 months, and 18 days, breaking the previous record set by Miguel Tendillo in Euro 1980. On 28 June, Pedri became the youngest player to feature in a knock-out game at the European Championships when he started in the round of 16 against Croatia, aged 18 years and 215 days; however, he scored an own goal when goalkeeper Unai Simón failed to control his long pass back. Spain eventually won the match 5–3 in extra-time. He played all but one minute of Spain's six matches, and had an important impact on Spain's run to the semifinal, where they were defeated 4–2 on penalties by eventual winners Italy following a 1–1 draw after extra-time; during the latter match, he completed 65 of the 66 passes he attempted. For his performances, he was voted the Young Player of the Tournament, and was the only Spanish player in the tournament to be named in the Team of the Tournament.

On 29 June 2021, Pedri was called up to the Spain squad for the 2020 Summer Olympics. The move to include Pedri in Spain's Olympic squad attracted criticism from Barcelona, with manager Ronald Koeman branding the decision to call up Pedri for two international tournaments in the same summer as "too much". On 22 July, Pedri played the full 90 minutes in Spain's 0–0 opener against Egypt. The game was Pedri's 66th of the season. In the final, Pedri's 73rd game of the season, Spain suffered a 2–1 loss to Brazil in extra-time.

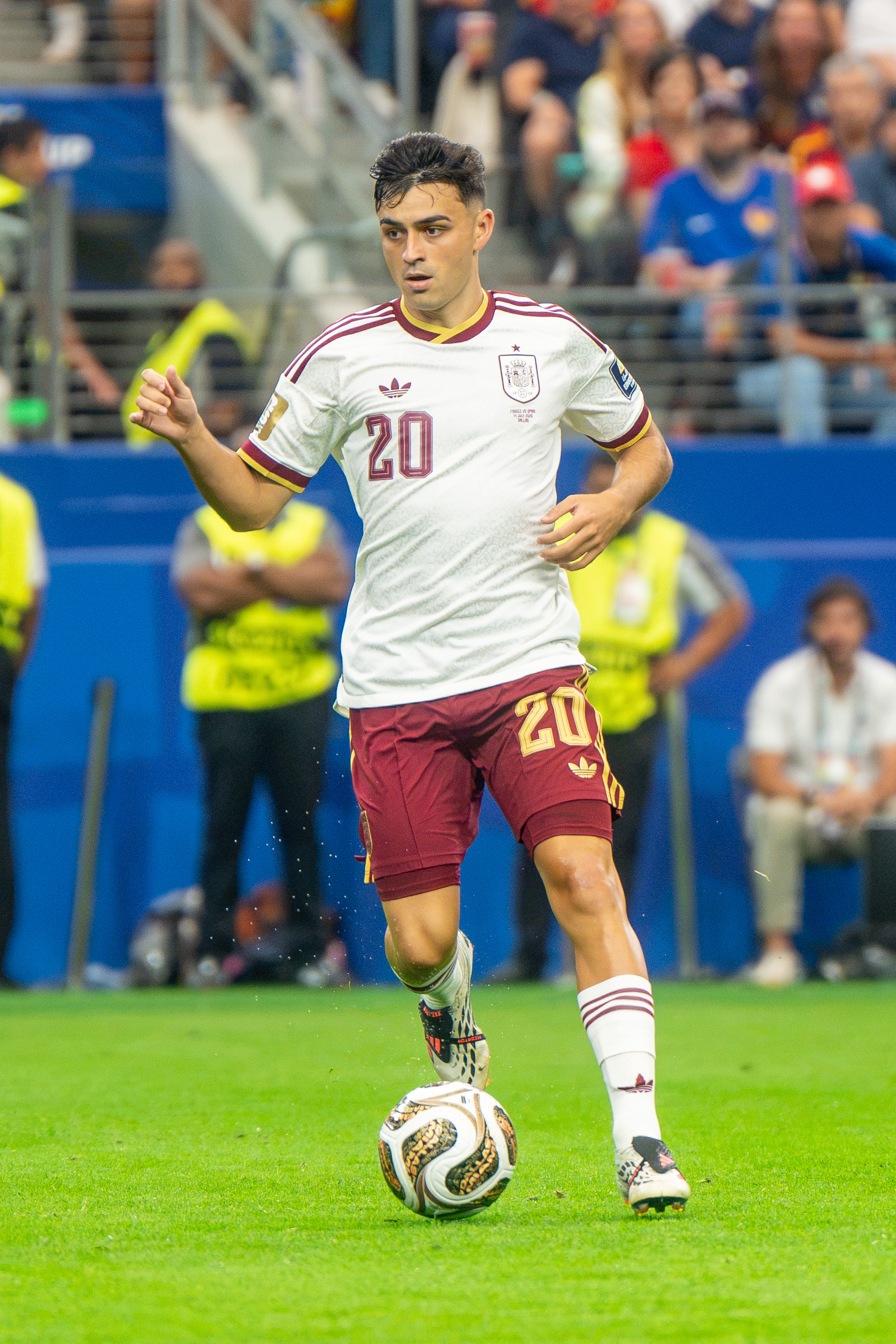
Pedri playing for Spain against France in the 2026 FIFA World Cup semi-finals

Pedri was named in Spain's squad for the 2022 FIFA World Cup in Qatar. He started in all four of Spain's matches. Spain were knocked out by Morocco in the round of 16 on penalties.

==== 2024–Present: First international titles ====
Pedri was called up to Spain's UEFA Euro 2024 squad despite not having been featured in the national side since the World Cup due to prolonged injury issues. He scored his first senior international goals in a friendly against Northern Ireland on 8 June 2024, contributing with a brace to a 5–1 win. Pedri started in Spain's opening match against Croatia, assisting the second goal in a 3–0 win to Fabián Ruiz; he also started in the following group stage match, a 1–0 win over Italy, and the round of 16 4–1 victory over Georgia. In the quarter-final clash with hosts Germany, Pedri left the field in the eighth minute after being fouled by Toni Kroos, with what was later diagnosed as an inner ligament stretch of the knee; Dani Olmo replaced him in the match, which ended in a 2–1 victory, and throughout the rest of the tournament, as Spain went on to be crowned champions, defeating England 2–1 in the final.

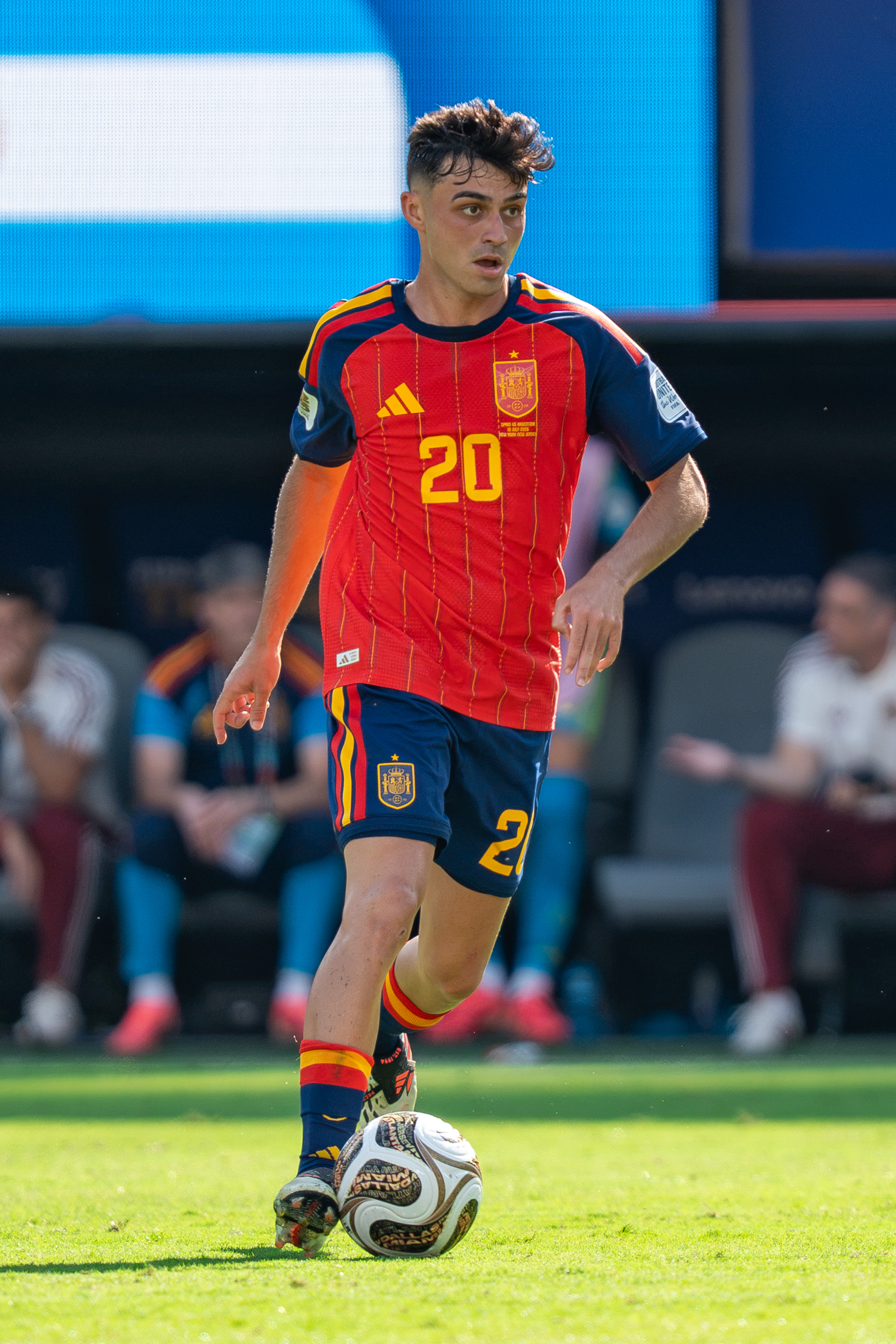
Pedri with Spain against Argentina at the 2026 World Cup final

On 25 May 2026, Pedri was named in Spain’s' squad for the 2026 FIFA World Cup. He started Spain's initial matches of the tournament, but was subsequently benched in the knockout stage in favour of Fabián Ruiz, who retained his place in the starting lineup for the remainder of the tournament. Pedri later came on as a substitute in the final, as Spain defeated Argentina 1–0 after extra time to win the title.

== Style of play ==
Pedri usually plays in a free midfield role, which allows him to roam the pitch; he likes to occupy central areas and operate between the lines, although he is also capable of moving out wide and running towards the touchline to create chances for teammates. He even drops deep to the defence to pick up the ball. He normally situates himself on either the left or right flank, or even as a number 8. Indeed, although he initially played as a winger, he was later moved to a central midfield role, although he is also capable of playing as an attacking midfielder, as well as in several other offensive and midfield roles. He has also occasionally been used as a defensive midfielder and even as a centre-forward.

Pedri is known for his technical skills, dribbling, ball control, passing, awareness, and vision, as well as his ability to manage himself in tight spaces, exploit gaps, and play the final ball or penetrating passes with either foot, making him an effective playmaker. Moreover, he is also noted for his dribbling skills, stamina, calm composure under pressure, and his ability to play with either foot. Pedri's role has been a mezzala in the Italian sports media. His slight frame, qualities, position, and playing style have led him to be compared to former Barcelona players such as Xavi, Andrés Iniesta, Michael Laudrup, and Lionel Messi.

== Career statistics ==
=== Club ===
As of match played 22 November 2026

Appearances and goals by club, season and competition
Club	Season	League			Copa del Rey		Europe		Other		Total	
Club	Season	Division	Apps	Goals	Apps	Goals	Apps	Goals	Apps	Goals	Apps	Goals
Las Palmas	2019–20	Segunda División	36	4	1	0	—		—		37	4
Barcelona	2020–21	La Liga	37	3	6	0	7 (Note: Appearances in UEFA Champions League)	1	2 (Note: Appearance(s) in Supercopa de España)	0	52	4
Barcelona	2021–22	La Liga	12	3	1	1	8 (Note: Two appearances in UEFA Champions League, six appearances and one goal in UEFA Europa League)	1	1	0	22	5
Barcelona	2022–23	La Liga	26	6	1	0	6 (Note: Five appearances in UEFA Champions League, one appearance in UEFA Europa League)	0	2	1	35	7
Barcelona	2023–24	La Liga	24	4	2	0	6	0	2	0	34	4
Barcelona	2024–25	La Liga	37	4	6	2	14	0	2	0	59	6
Barcelona	2025–26	La Liga	29	2	3	0	9	0	2	0	43	2
Barcelona	2026–27	La Liga	13	1	0	0	4	0	0	0	17	1
Barcelona	Total		178	23	19	3	54	2	11	1	262	29
Career total			214	27	20	3	54	2	11	1	299	33

=== International ===
As of match played 15 November 2026

Appearances and goals by national team and year
National team	Year	Apps	Goals
Spain	2021	10	0
Spain	2022	8	0
Spain	2023	0	0
Spain	2024	12	2
Spain	2025	8	3
Spain	2026	17	1
Total		55	6

Spain score listed first, score column indicates score after each Pedri goal.

List of international goals scored by Pedri
No.	Date	Venue	Cap	Opponent	Score	Result	Competition
1	8 June 2024	Estadi Mallorca Son Moix, Palma, Spain	20	Northern Ireland	1–1	5–1	Friendly
2	8 June 2024	Estadi Mallorca Son Moix, Palma, Spain	20	Northern Ireland	3–1	5–1	Friendly
3	5 June 2025	MHPArena, Stuttgart, Germany	33	France	4–0	5–4	2025 UEFA Nations League Finals
4	7 September 2025	Konya Metropolitan Municipality Stadium, Konya, Turkey	36	Turkey	1–0	6–0	2026 FIFA World Cup qualification
5	7 September 2025	Konya Metropolitan Municipality Stadium, Konya, Turkey	36	Turkey	6–0	6–0	2026 FIFA World Cup qualification
6	8 June 2026	Estadio Cuauhtémoc, Puebla, Mexico	41	Peru	2–0	3–1	Friendly

== Honours ==
Barcelona

- La Liga: 2022–23, 2024–25, 2025–26
- Copa del Rey: 2020–21, 2024–25
- Supercopa de España: 2023, 2025, 2026

Spain U23

- Summer Olympic Silver Medal: 2020

Spain

- FIFA World Cup: 2026
- UEFA European Championship: 2024
- UEFA Nations League: runner-up: 2024–25

Individual

- UEFA Champions League Breakthrough XI: 2020
- UEFA European Championship Young Player of the Tournament: 2020
- UEFA European Championship Team of the Tournament: 2020
- Golden Boy: 2021
- Kopa Trophy: 2021; third place: 2023
- IFFHS World's Best Youth (U20) Player: 2021
- IFFHS The World Youth (U20) Team: 2021, 2022
- IFFHS Men's Youth (U20) UEFA Team: 2021, 2022
- IFFHS Men's World Team: 2025
- La Liga Team of the Season: 2021–22, 2022–23, 2024–25 2025–26
- Trofeo Aldo Rovira: 2020–21
- Premi Barça Jugadors (Barça Players Award): 2021–22, 2024–25
- La Liga U23 Player of the Month: October 2024
- La Liga Player of the Month: April 2025
- La Liga Goal of the Month: August 2025
- FIFPRO World 11: 2025
- FIFA Men's World 11: 2025
- The Athletic European Men's Team of the Season: 2024–25
- The Athletic La Liga Player of the Season: 2024–25
- The Athletic La Liga Team of the Season: 2024–25
