= Bajamar, Tenerife =

Town in Tenerife, Canary Islands, Spain

Bajamar
- Town
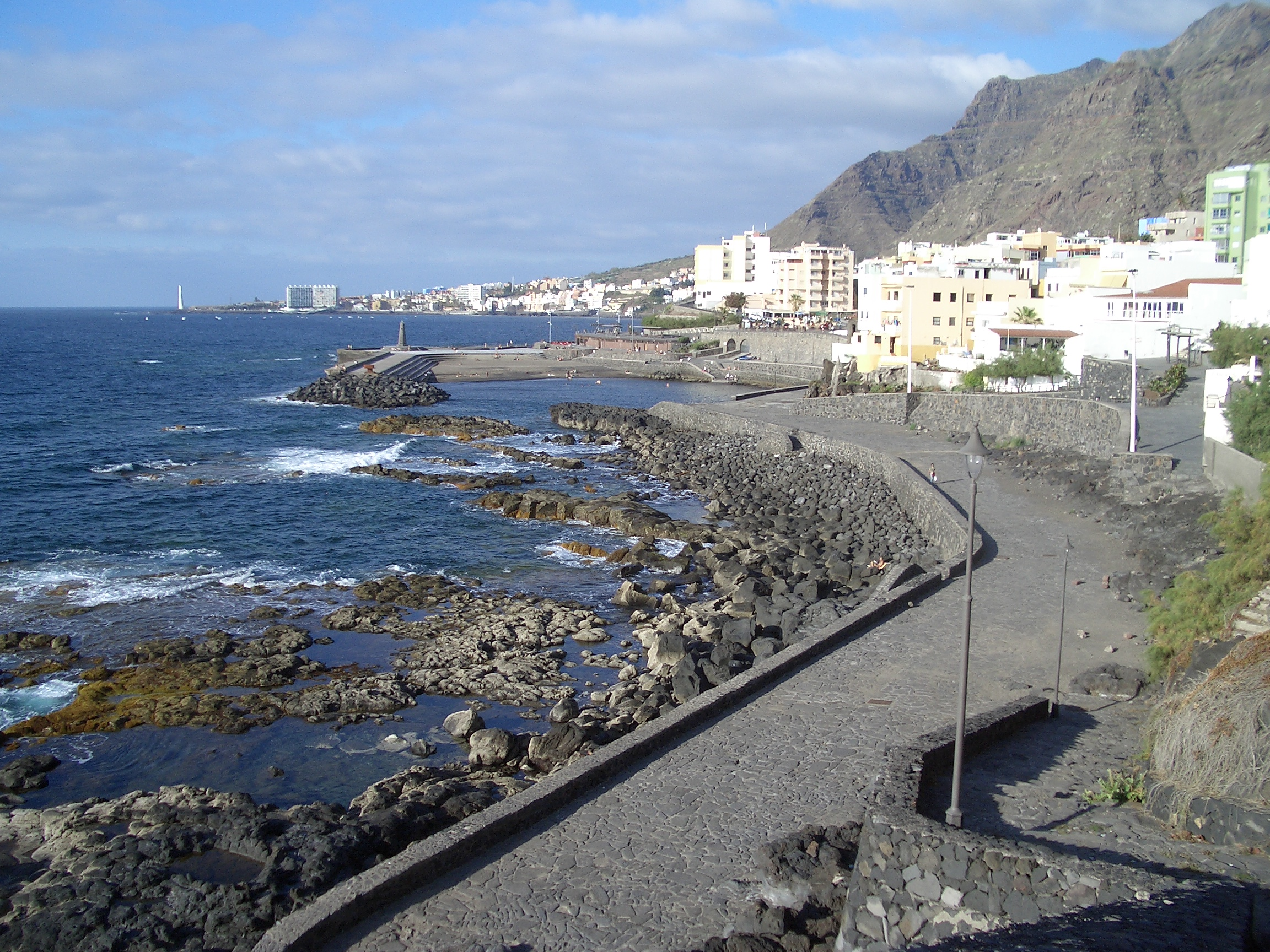

- Location within Spain, Canary Islands Location within Canary Islands Location within Tenerife
- Coordinates: 28°33′13.7″N 16°20′41.5″W
- Country: Spain

Bajamar is a coastal town in the northeast of the island of Tenerife in the Canary Islands, belonging to the municipality of San Cristóbal de La Laguna. Administratively, it is included in Zone 5 of the municipality. Formerly, it was considered a neighbourhood of Tejina, another town in San Cristóbal de La Laguna.

== Features ==
Bajamar is located at the foot of the westernmost foothills of the Anaga Massif, fourteen kilometers from the town of La Laguna. It has an average altitude of 48 meters above sea level, reaching its maximum 601 meters above sea level at Pico Isogue.

Bajamar occupies an area of 2.08 km² that includes the urban nucleus and a small rural and natural area, partially included in the protected space of the Anaga rural park. It borders Punta del Hidalgo, in the area of El Paso del Guanche, with Tegueste in the summits, and with Tejina in the area of El Riego.

It is home to the Bajamar Citizen Center, the El Tamboril Children's Center, the hermitage of San Juan, and a Red Cross post. It also owns the CBV Costa Lagunera Basketball School and the Bajamar Yacht Club.

In recent years it has gone from being a tourist center with numerous hotels to a local tourist area and a residential area with several apartments and no hotels.

The town has several natural pools and the beach of Bajamar or San Juan, as well as the natural pool of Mariane and Charco Redondo and the surfing zone of Baja Nueva, El Paso, el Lobo and las Bordas.

== Demographics ==
Demographic variation of Bajamar 5
Year	2000	2001	2002	2003	2004	2005	2006	2007	2008	2009	2010	2011	2012	2013	2014	2015
Population	1,412	1,546	1,615	1,673	1,681	1,826	1,882	1,878	1992	2,106	2,147	2,219	2,239	2,033	2,104	2,141

== Festivals ==
Bajamar celebrates Gran Poder de Dios from August 7 to August 25. During August, the Bajamar International Folkloric Festival is celebrated, organized by the Isogue Folkloric Group. On August 18, 2000, coinciding with the VI edition, the Bajamar Folk Festival acquired international status.

The Bajamar 3X3 basketball championship is also held, the oldest in the Canary Islands (since 1993), organized by the CBV Costa Lagunera. For some years now, the Las Viejas Glorias del Paso Festival, celebrating surfing, has been celebrated on the last Sunday of August.

== Communications ==
The town is reached through the Bajamar-Punta del Hidalgo TF-13 Highway.

=== Public transportation ===
By bus, called guagua, it is connected by the following TITSA lines:

Line	Journey	Route
050	The Lagoon - Tegueste - Bajamar - Punta del Hidalgo	Schedule/Line
105	Santa Cruz - Punta del Hidalgo (via La Laguna )	Schedule/Line
224	La Laguna - Valle Guerra - Tejina through El Boquerón - Punta del Hidalgo	Schedule/Line

=== Paths ===
To Bajamar they lead a path suitable for hiking, which is approved in the Network of Senderos de Tenerife: 7

- Trail PR TF-12 Cruz del Carmen - Bajamar

== Places of interest ==
- Bajamar Natural Pool
- San Juan or Bajamar Beach
- Arenal Beach
- The Wolf Beach
- Charco de Laja or Charco de los Pobres
- Puddle of El Mariane

== Notable people ==
- Pedri (born 2002), footballer
