= 2026–27 FC Barcelona season =

128th season of FC Barcelona

Barcelona
2026–27 season
- President: Joan Laporta
- Head coach: Hansi Flick
- Stadium: Camp Nou
- La Liga: 1st
- Copa del Rey: Round of 32
- Supercopa de España: Semi-finals
- UEFA Champions League: League phase
- Top goalscorer: League: Raphinha (15); All: Raphinha (19)
- Highest home attendance: 62,055 vs Real Madrid (25 October 2026)
- Lowest home attendance: 45,838 vs Feyenoord (9 September 2026)
- Average home league attendance: 57,391
- Biggest win: Home: Barcelona 7–2 Racing Santander; Barcelona 6–1 Alavés; Away: Elche 0–5 Barcelona; Valencia 0–5 Barcelona
- Biggest defeat: Home: Barcelona 1–2 Real Madrid; Away: Paris Saint-Germain 4–2 Barcelona
| Home colours | Away colours | Third colours |
- All statistics correct as of 22 November 2026.

The 2026–27 Futbol Club Barcelona season is the club's 128th season in existence and their 96th consecutive season in the top flight. In addition to the domestic league, Barcelona are participating in this season's editions of the UEFA Champions League (entering for the 23rd consecutive season). They are also playing in the Copa del Rey and the Supercopa de España. The season covers the period from 1 July 2026 until 30 June 2027.

This is the first full season Barcelona are playing at their historic Camp Nou stadium since its closure for renovation, having returned to the ground partway through the previous season. This is also the club's first season since 2021–22 without forwards Robert Lewandowski, who departed after his contract expired and joined MLS club Chicago Fire, and Ferran Torres, who left to join French side Paris Saint-Germain.

With Marc-André ter Stegen on loan at Ajax until the end of the season, this is Barcelona's first campaign without any members of the squad that won the 2015 Champions League. It is also the club's first squad without a player who won the Champions League with Barcelona since the 1997–98 season.

== Kits ==
- Supplier: Nike
- Sponsors: Spotify (front (Note: In October 2026, it was announced that the logo of Tyler, the Creator's Golf Wang would appear on the front of the jersey for the Clásico on 25 October.)) / Midea (sleeves) / Barça Foundation (back)

Home (Note: The design features the club's traditional blue and garnet stripes with colour gradation, a new typeface inspired by Catalan modernism for player names and numbers, and patterned lines on the back.)
Home alternate
Away (Note: A collaboration between Nike and the Kobe Bryant estate, replacing the standard Swoosh with the Kobe Sheath logo to celebrate Bryant's admiration for the club.) (Note: The design features a black-to-purple gradient, gold detailing, a snake-skin-inspired pattern and an iridescent club crest. The collar contains the Kobe Bryant quote “Leave the game better than you found it.”)
Third (Note: The design draws inspiration from the club's mid-1990s kits, featuring contrasting shades of turquoise separated by a zigzag line.)
Fourth
Fifth
(2025–26 third) (Note: The design features a bright mango-orange base inspired by the shirt worn by the club in the 2009 Club World Cup, with navy blue collar and back stripes and geometric piping across the front, drawing on Nike's Total 90 designs of the early 2000s.)
Goalkeeper 1
Goalkeeper 2
Goalkeeper 3
Mamba 1
Mamba 2

Training

Training 2

Training 3

Training 4

== Season overview ==
=== Preseason ===
On 29 May, Barcelona announced the signing of Anthony Gordon from Newcastle United for a total fee of up to €80 million, signing a contract until 2031.

On 5 June, Barcelona announced that the pre-season would start with the players' medical and fitness tests on 13 July. For players involved in the World Cup, the club granted extended holiday periods, allowing them to report back later in staggered waves. The club also announced a week-long training camp in England, based at St George's Park between 27 July and 3 August.

On 23 June, Barcelona agreed the transfer of goalkeeper Iñaki Peña to Panathinaikos for €3 million, and exercised their purchase option to sign Egyptain forward Hamza Abdelkarim from Al Ahly on a permanent basis until 2029. A week later, Ansu Fati's move to Monaco was made permanent for €11 million, after Monaco triggered their buy option following his loan spell there.

On 2 July, young winger Dani Rodríguez left permanently for Dinamo Zagreb. The following day, goalkeeper Diego Kochen was loaned to Lyngby Boldklub. On 17 July, young defender Andrés Cuenca completed a permanent move to Como for €500K.

On 23 July, Karim Adeyemi arrived from Borussia Dortmund for a total fee of up to €29 million, reuniting with manager Hansi Flick, who gave him his Germany debut. He signed a five-year deal. The next day, Barcelona opened preseason behind closed doors with a 4–1 win over Catalan side Europa.

On 29 July, Barcelona announced plans for a friendly against a local team in Tangier, Morocco, scheduled for 15 August. Two days later, the club brought in Belgian teenage winger Jesse Bisiwu from Club Brugge for €8.5 million, signing him through 2031 primarily for the reserve side. Later on, Barcelona played their first public friendly, drawing 2–2 away to Birmingham City at St Andrew's. Hamza Abdelkarim scored twice, but Barça lost the ensuing penalty shootout 3–2.

=== August ===
On 4 August, Marc-André ter Stegen was loaned to Ajax. The next day, centre-back Alexis Olmedo left permanently for Celta Fortuna. On 6 August, Barcelona cancelled the planned friendly in Tangier, citing the ongoing situation in Ceuta as making the match inappropriate.

On 8 August, Barcelona took part in a triangular tournament in Udine (the Friuli Venezia Giulia Cup), beating Nottingham Forest 1–0 before losing to hosts Udinese by the same scoreline in a separate 45-minute fixture. Two days later, Ronald Araújo joined Liverpool on loan, with an option for Liverpool to make the move permanent next summer for €55 million.

On 15 August, Barcelona sold Ferran Torres to Paris Saint-Germain for €48.5 million. The following day, a much stronger Barcelona side thrashed Basel 2–5 at St. Jakob-Park. Jesse Bisiwu scored twice off the bench, with further goals from Karim Adeyemi, Hamza Abdelkarim and a Lamine Yamal penalty. A day after that, young defender Jofre Torrents was transferred to Ajax for €6 million.

On 18 August, Rodri completed a move from Manchester City for a total fee of up to €76.5 million. The Ballon d'Or winner signed a four-year contract. The next day, Barcelona closed out preseason with a 2–1 win over Al Ahly in the Joan Gamper Trophy at Camp Nou. Goals from Hamza Abdelkarim and Raphinha secured the win, with Anthony Gordon missing a late penalty.

On 20 August, João Cancelo returned to Barcelona on a permanent, free transfer after terminating his contract with Al Hilal, signing until 2029 for his third spell at the club. On the same day, young goalkeeper Áron Yaakobishvili was loaned to Almería. The following day, midfielder Tommy Marqués moved to Braga for €12 million.

On 23 August, Barcelona opened their La Liga title defence with a 0–5 win away against Elche. Karim Adeyemi and Anthony Gordon made their official debuts, with the first scoring his first goal. Other goals came from Raphinha and Fermín López. Four days later, Barcelona completed the signing of Croatian goalkeeper Dominik Livaković from Fenerbahçe for a total fee of €4 million, on a four-year deal through 2030. Later on, Barcelona beat Athletic Bilbao 2–0 at Camp Nou, with Raphinha and Fermín scoring. Rodri made his Barcelona debut off the bench.

On 29 August, Héctor Fort was transferred to Real Sociedad for €8.5 million. Two days later, Barcelona thrashed Rayo Vallecano 5–2 at Camp Nou. Raphinha and Lamine Yamal both scored braces to secure the victory. Hamza Abdelkarim came off the bench late in the second half to make his official debut for the club.

=== September ===
On 1 September, Barcelona announced the signing of Gabriel Jesus from Arsenal for a total fee of up to €14 million, signing a contract until 2029. The club also confirmed the departures of Guille Fernández to Mallorca for €2.2 million and Álvaro Cortés to Royal Antwerp for €3.5 million, while Toni Fernández and Marc Casadó joined Venezia and Deportivo A Coruña respectively, both on loan.

On 6 September, Barcelona secured a resounding 0–5 victory over Valencia at the Mestalla, with goals from Lamine Yamal (2), Raphinha, Fermín, and Pedri. The match also featured Gabriel Jesus' official debut for the club. Three days later, in their opening UEFA Champions League match, Barcelona defeated Feyenoord 5–1 at home, with Raphinha scoring twice, Lamine Yamal from a free-kick, Gabriel Jesus scoring his first goal for the club, and Karim Adeyemi also finding the net.

On 13 September, Barcelona defeated Levante 2–4 away, thanks to goals from Lamine Yamal (2), Adeyemi, and Xavi Espart. The latter scored his first goal for the club. Three days later, Barcelona thrashed Racing Santander 7–2 at Camp Nou, with goals from João Cancelo, Raphinha (3), Gabriel Jesus and Lamine Yamal, as well as an own goal from Asier Villalibre.

Barcelona concluded the month on 19 September due to the FIFA international break, with a 1–3 away win against Sevilla, thanks to a perfect hat-trick from Raphinha. The match also saw Dominik Livaković make his debut for the club.

=== October ===
Barcelona started the month on 10 October with a 3–0 home win against Getafe, thanks to goals from Gabriel Jesus, Jules Koundé, and Anthony Gordon, who scored his first goal for the club. The result marked Barcelona’s ninth consecutive victory across all competitions, setting a new club record for the best start to a season. On 13 October, Barcelona came from behind to thrash Galatasaray 1–4 away at Rams Park, with goals from Cancelo, Gordon, Fermín, and Adeyemi.

On 17 October, Barcelona crushed Real Betis 2–5 away at La Cartuja, with goals from Lamine Yamal, Gabriel Jesus, Dani Olmo, Eric García, and Rodri, who scored his first goal for the club. The victory extended Barcelona’s winning streak to nine consecutive league matches, matching Real Madrid’s record for the best start to a La Liga season, set in 1968–69. Three days later, Barcelona suffered their first defeat against Paris Saint-Germain, falling 4–2 away at the Parc des Princes, with Xavi Espart and Lamine Yamal scoring.

On 25 October, Barcelona were beaten 1–2 by Real Madrid at home in the Clásico, marking their second consecutive defeat and their first in the league, with Raphinha scoring their only goal. On 31 October, Barcelona returned to winning ways with a 6–1 win over Alavés at Camp Nou. Lamine Yamal and Raphinha scored twice each, while Gordon and Fermín López also found the net. Brian Fariñas made his first-team debut.

=== November ===
On 3 November, Barcelona defeated Aston Villa 3–0 at home, thanks to goals from Lamine Yamal and Raphinha (2). On 8 November, Fermín's brace secured a 1–2 away victory for Barcelona against Atlético Madrid at the Metropolitano, allowing them to maintain their lead at the top of the league.

On 22 November, Barcelona came from 0–2 down to beat Villarreal 3–2 at Camp Nou, with goals from Fermín and Gerard Martín before Pau Navarro's own goal sealed the comeback.

== Management team ==
| Position | Name |
|---|---|
| Head coach | (Germany) Hansi Flick |
| Assistant coaches | (Germany) Marcus Sorg, (Croatia) Toni Tapalović, (Germany) Heiko Westermann, (Spain) Arnau Blanco |
| Goalkeeping coach | (Spain) José Ramón de la Fuente |
| Fitness coaches | (Germany) Benjamin Kugel, (Spain) Pepe Conde, (Spain) Lucas del Campo, (Spain) Fernando Hernández, (Spain) Andrés Martín, (Spain) Milos Mallol |
| Rehab coaches | (Spain) Juan Carlos Pérez, (Spain) Yon Álvarez |
| Analysts | (Germany) Michael Hasemann, (Spain) Eloy Jordan, (Spain) Francesc Martí, (Spain) Xavier Pavo, (Spain) Jordi Pons, (Spain) Guillem Escriu |

- Last updated: 25 September 2026
- Source: FC Barcelona Annual Report 2025/26 AS Mundo Deportivo

== Players ==
=== First team ===
| N | Pos. | Nat. | Name | Age | EU | Since | App | Goals | Ends | Transfer fee | Notes |
Goalkeepers
| 1 | GK | (Spain) | Joan Garcia | 25 | EU | 2025 | 61 | 0 | 2031 | €25M | |
| 13 | GK | (Poland) | Wojciech Szczęsny | 36 | EU | 2024 | 43 | 0 | 2027 | Free | |
| 25 | GK | (Croatia) | Dominik Livaković | 31 | EU | 2026 | 1 | 0 | 2030 | €2M | |
Defenders
| 2 | DF | (Portugal) | João Cancelo | 32 | EU | 2026 | 79 | 8 | 2029 | Free | |
| 3 | DF | (Spain) | Alejandro Balde | 23 | EU | 2022 | 173 | 3 | 2028 | Youth system | |
| 5 | DF | (Spain) | Pau Cubarsí | 19 | EU | 2024 | 141 | 2 | 2029 | Youth system | |
| 12 | DF | (Spain) | Xavi Espart | 19 | EU | 2025 | 15 | 2 | 2030 | Youth system | |
| 15 | DF | (Denmark) | Andreas Christensen | 30 | EU | 2022 | 106 | 5 | 2028 | Free | |
| 18 | DF | (Spain) | Gerard Martín | 24 | EU | 2023 | 108 | 2 | 2028 | €100K | |
| 23 | DF | (France) | Jules Koundé | 28 | EU | 2022 | 197 | 11 | 2030 | €50M | |
| 24 | DF | (Spain) | Eric García (3rd captain) | 25 | EU | 2021 | 177 | 8 | 2031 | Free | Originally from youth system |
Midfielders
| 4 | MF | (Spain) | Brian Fariñas | 20 | EU | 2026 | 3 | 0 | 2028 | Youth system | |
| 6 | MF | (Spain) | Gavi | 22 | EU | 2021 | 176 | 10 | 2030 | Youth system | |
| 7 | MF | (Spain) | Fermín López | 23 | EU | 2023 | 152 | 41 | 2031 | Youth system | |
| 8 | MF | (Spain) | Pedri (vice-captain) | 23 | EU | 2020 | 262 | 29 | 2030 | €5M | |
| 16 | MF | (Spain) | Rodri | 30 | EU | 2026 | 14 | 1 | 2030 | €60M | |
| 20 | MF | (Spain) | Dani Olmo | 28 | EU | 2024 | 101 | 21 | 2030 | €55M | Originally from youth system |
| 21 | MF | (Netherlands) | Frenkie de Jong (4th captain) | 29 | EU | 2019 | 302 | 20 | 2029 | €75M | |
| 22 | MF | (Spain) | Marc Bernal | 19 | EU | 2023 | 51 | 5 | 2029 | Youth system | |
Forwards
| 9 | FW | (Brazil) | Gabriel Jesus | 29 | Non-EU | 2026 | 10 | 4 | 2029 | €10M | |
| 10 | FW | (Spain) | Lamine Yamal (5th captain) | 19 | EU | 2023 | 168 | 62 | 2031 | Youth system | |
| 11 | FW | (Brazil) | Raphinha (captain) | 29 | EU | 2022 | 192 | 94 | 2030 | €58M | Second nationality: Italy |
| 14 | FW | (Germany) | Karim Adeyemi | 24 | EU | 2026 | 16 | 4 | 2031 | €22M | |
| 17 | FW | (England) | Anthony Gordon | 25 | Non-EU | 2026 | 16 | 3 | 2031 | €70M | |
| 19 | FW | (Sweden) | Roony Bardghji | 21 | EU | 2025 | 28 | 2 | 2029 | €2.5M | |

- Last updated: 22 November 2026
- Source: FC Barcelona, La Liga and UEFA
- Ordered by squad number.

=== Reserve team ===
| N | Pos. | Nat. | Name | Age | EU | Since | App | Goals | Ends | Transfer fee | Notes |
|---|---|---|---|---|---|---|---|---|---|---|---|
| 27 | FW | (Belgium) | Jesse Bisiwu | 18 | EU | 2026 | 0 | 0 | 2031 | €8.5M | |
| 29 | FW | (Egypt) | Hamza Abdelkarim | 18 | Non-EU | 2026 | 2 | 0 | 2030 | €1.5M | |
| 30 | MF | (Spain) | Ebrima Tunkara | 16 | EU | 2026 | 0 | 0 | 2029 | Youth system | |
| 31 | GK | (Spain) | Eder Aller | 19 | EU | 2025 | 0 | 0 | 2028 | Youth system | |
| 32 | MF | (Israel) | Orian Goren | 17 | EU | 2026 | 0 | 0 | 2028 | Youth system | Second nationality: Czech Republic |
| 33 | DF | (Spain) | Jordi Pesquer | 17 | EU | 2026 | 0 | 0 | 2028 | Youth system | |
| 35 | GK | (Spain) | Iker Rodríguez | 18 | EU | 2026 | 0 | 0 | 2027 | Youth system | |
| 37 | FW | (Netherlands) | Shane Kluivert | 19 | EU | 2026 | 0 | 0 | 2028 | Youth system | |
| 38 | MF | (Spain) | Pedro Villar | 18 | EU | 2026 | 0 | 0 | 2030 | Youth system | |
| 39 | DF | (Spain) | Landry Farré | 19 | EU | 2026 | 0 | 0 | 2028 | Youth system | Second nationality: Ivory Coast |
| 40 | DF | (Spain) | Guillem Víctor | 19 | EU | 2026 | 0 | 0 | 2028 | Youth system | |
| 41 | DF | (Spain) | Àlex Campos | 18 | EU | 2026 | 0 | 0 | 2029 | Youth system | |

- Last updated: 3 November 2026
- Source: FC Barcelona, La Liga and UEFA
- Ordered by squad number.

=== Contract renewals ===
| No. | Pos. | Nat. | Name | Date | Until | Source |
|---|---|---|---|---|---|---|
| 15 | DF | (Denmark) | Andreas Christensen | 1 July 2026 | 30 June 2028 | |
| 29 | FW | (Egypt) | Hamza Abdelkarim | 11 September 2026 | 30 June 2030 | |
| 11 | FW | (Brazil) | Raphinha | 5 November 2026 | 30 June 2030 | |
| 12 | DF | (Spain) | Xavi Espart | 20 November 2026 | 30 June 2030 | |

== Transfers ==
=== In ===
| No. | Pos. | Player | Transfer from | Type | Fee | Date | Source |
Summer
| — | GK | (Spain) Ander Astralaga | Granada | Loan return | None | 1 July 2026 | |
| — | FW | (Spain) Ansu Fati | (France) Monaco (Note: Monaco is a Monégasque club playing in the French football league system.) | Loan return | None | 1 July 2026 | |
| – | DF | (Spain) Héctor Fort | Elche | Loan return | None | 1 July 2026 | |
| — | GK | (Hungary) Áron Yaakobishvili | Andorra (Note: Andorra is an Andorran club playing in the Spanish football league system.) | Loan return | None | 1 July 2026 | |
| — | GK | (Spain) Iñaki Peña | Elche | Loan return | None | 1 July 2026 | |
| 1 | GK | (Germany) Marc-André ter Stegen | Girona | Loan return | None | 1 July 2026 | |
| — | DF | (Spain) Andrés Cuenca | Sporting Gijón | Loan return | None | 1 July 2026 | |
| 17 | FW | (England) Anthony Gordon | (England) Newcastle United | Transfer | €70M + €10M variables | 1 July 2026 | |
| 29 | FW | (Egypt) Hamza Abdelkarim | (Egypt) Al Ahly | Transfer | €1.5M + €3.5M variables | 1 July 2026 | |
| 14 | FW | (Germany) Karim Adeyemi | (Germany) Borussia Dortmund | Transfer | €22M + €7M variables | 23 July 2026 | |
| 27 | FW | (Belgium) Jesse Bisiwu | (Belgium) Club Brugge | Transfer | €8.5M | 31 July 2026 | |
| 16 | MF | (Spain) Rodri | (England) Manchester City | Transfer | €60M + €15M variables | 18 August 2026 | |
| 2 | DF | (Portugal) João Cancelo | (Saudi Arabia) Al-Hilal | Transfer | Free | 20 August 2026 | |
| 25 | GK | (Croatia) Dominik Livaković | (Turkey) Fenerbahçe | Transfer | €2M + €2M variables | 27 August 2026 | |
| 9 | FW | (Brazil) Gabriel Jesus | (England) Arsenal | Transfer | €10M + €4M variables | 1 September 2026 | |
Winter

=== Out ===
| No. | Pos. | Player | Transfer to | Type | Fee | Date | Source |
Summer
| 14 | FW | (England) Marcus Rashford | (England) Manchester United | Loan return | None | 1 July 2026 | |
| 2 | DF | (Portugal) João Cancelo | (Saudi Arabia) Al-Hilal | Loan return | None | 1 July 2026 | |
| 9 | FW | (Poland) Robert Lewandowski | (United States) Chicago Fire | End of contract | Free | 1 July 2026 | |
| — | GK | (Spain) Ander Astralaga | Atlético Madrileño | End of contract | Free | 1 July 2026 | |
| — | GK | (Spain) Iñaki Peña | (Greece) Panathinaikos | Transfer | €3M | 1 July 2026 | |
| — | FW | (Spain) Ansu Fati | (France) Monaco | Transfer | €11M | 1 July 2026 | |
| 37 | FW | (Spain) Dani Rodríguez | (Croatia) Dinamo Zagreb | Transfer | Free | 2 July 2026 | |
| 31 | GK | (United States) Diego Kochen | (Denmark) Lyngby | Loan | Free | 3 July 2026 | |
| 38 | DF | (Spain) Andrés Cuenca | (Italy) Como | Transfer | €500K | 17 July 2026 | |
| 1 | GK | (Germany) Marc-André ter Stegen | (Netherlands) Ajax | Loan | Free | 4 August 2026 | |
| 32 | DF | (Spain) Alexis Olmedo | Celta Fortuna | Transfer | Undisclosed | 5 August 2026 | |
| 4 | DF | (Uruguay) Ronald Araújo | (England) Liverpool | Loan | Free | 10 August 2026 | |
| 7 | FW | (Spain) Ferran Torres | (France) Paris Saint-Germain | Transfer | €48.5M | 15 August 2026 | |
| 26 | DF | (Spain) Jofre Torrents | (Netherlands) Ajax | Transfer | €6M (Note: Barcelona reserves a right to repurchase and 50% of any future sale.) | 17 August 2026 | |
| — | GK | (Hungary) Áron Yaakobishvili | Almería | Loan | Free | 20 August 2026 | |
| 43 | MF | (Spain) Tommy Marqués | (Portugal) Braga | Transfer | €11M + €1M variables | 21 August 2026 | |
| — | DF | (Spain) Héctor Fort | Real Sociedad | Transfer | €8.5M (Note: Barcelona reserves a right to repurchase and 40% of any future sale.) | 29 August 2026 | |
| 30 | MF | (Spain) Guille Fernández | Mallorca | Transfer | €2.2M (Note: Barcelona reserves a right to repurchase and 50% of any future sale.) | 1 September 2026 | |
| 29 | FW | (Spain) Toni Fernández | (Italy) Venezia | Loan | Free (Note: The deal included an obligation to make the transfer permanent for €4 million if the stipulated conditions are met, with Barcelona retaining 50% of any future transfer fee.) | 1 September 2026 | |
| 26 | DF | (Spain) Álvaro Cortés | (Belgium) Antwerp | Transfer | €3.5M (Note: Barcelona reserves a right to repurchase and 50% of any future sale.) | 1 September 2026 | |
| 17 | MF | (Spain) Marc Casadó | Deportivo A Coruña | Loan | Free | 1 September 2026 | |
Winter

== Pre-season and friendlies ==
Win Draw Loss Fixtures

| 24 July 2026 Friendly | Barcelona | 4–1 | Europa | Sant Joan Despí, Spain |
| 20:00 CEST (UTC+2) | Diarra 13'; Fort 29'; Tunkara 48'; González 58' | Report | Ribeiro 42' | Stadium: Ciutat Esportiva Joan Gamper – Camp Tito Vilanova (Pitch 1); Attendance: 0 Referee: Gerard Rius Riu (Spain) |
Note: This match was played behind closed doors.

| 31 July 2026 Friendly | Birmingham City | 2–2 (3–2 p) | Barcelona | Birmingham, England |
| 19:45 BST (UTC+1) | Klarer (yellow card) 18'; Priske 31'; Stansfield (yellow card) 50'; Solís 68' | Report | Abdelkarim 42' (pen.), 60', (yellow card) 44' | Stadium: St Andrew's; Attendance: 28,366; Referee: Farai Hallam (England) |
| | Penalties |
| | Wright (penalty scored); Vázquez (penalty missed); Laird (penalty scored); Robinson (penalty missed); Roberts (penalty scored) | | (penalty scored) Cortés; (penalty missed) Bardghji; (penalty missed) Pesquer; (penalty scored) Guille; (penalty missed) Fariñas |

| 8 August 2026 Friuli Venezia Giulia Cup | Barcelona | 1–0 | Nottingham Forest | Udine, Italy |
| 21:00 CEST (UTC+2) | Raphinha 45' (pen.) | Report | | Stadium: Stadio Friuli; Referee: Michele Maccorin (Italy) |
Note: The match was part of the triangular Friuli Venezia Giulia Cup, with matches lasting 45 minutes.

| 8 August 2026 Friuli Venezia Giulia Cup | Udinese | 1–0 | Barcelona | Udine, Italy |
| 22:00 CEST (UTC+2) | Bayo 45' | Report | | Stadium: Stadio Friuli; Referee: Francesco Zago (Italy) |
Note: The match was part of the triangular Friuli Venezia Giulia Cup, with matches lasting 45 minutes.

| 16 August 2026 Friendly | Basel | 2–5 | Barcelona | Basel, Switzerland |
| 16:30 CEST (UTC+2) | Harder (yellow card) 41'; Doucoure 43'; Malouda (yellow card) 67'; Olaigbe 84' (pen.) | Report | Adeyemi 34'; Abdelkarim 49'; Yamal 81' (pen.); Bisiwu 89', 90+1' | Stadium: St. Jakob-Park; Referee: Anojen Kanagasingam (Switzerland) |

| 19 August 2026 Joan Gamper Trophy | Barcelona | 2–1 | Al Ahly | Barcelona, Spain |
| 20:00 CEST (UTC+2) | Abdelkarim 29'; Raphinha 45' (pen.); Gordon (penalty missed) 90+1' | Report | Zizo 51'; Eid (yellow card) 89' | Stadium: Camp Nou; Attendance: 54,224; Referee: Carlos Muñiz Ruiz (Spain) |

== Competitions ==
=== Overall record ===
| Competition | First match | Last match | Starting round | Final position | Record | | | | | | | |
| Competition | First match | Last match | Starting round | Final position | Pld | W | D | L | GF | GA | GD | Win % |
|---|---|---|---|---|---|---|---|---|---|---|---|---|
| La Liga | 23 August 2026 | 28–30 May 2027 | Matchday 1 | TBD | 13 | 12 | 0 | 1 | 51 | 15 | +36 | 92.31 |
| Copa del Rey | 15–17 December 2026 | TBD | Round of 32 | TBD | 0 | 0 | 0 | 0 | 0 | 0 | +0 | — |
| Supercopa de España | 2 February 2027 | February 2027 | Semi-finals | TBD | 0 | 0 | 0 | 0 | 0 | 0 | +0 | — |
| UEFA Champions League | 9 September 2026 | TBD | League phase | TBD | 4 | 3 | 0 | 1 | 14 | 6 | +8 | 75.00 |
| Total | | | | | 17 | 15 | 0 | 2 | 65 | 21 | +44 | 88.24 |

Last updated: 22 November 2026
Source: Soccerway

=== La Liga ===
==== League table ====
| Pos | Team | Pld | W | D | L | GF | GA | GD | Pts | Qualification or relegation |
|---|---|---|---|---|---|---|---|---|---|---|
| 1 | Barcelona | 13 | 12 | 0 | 1 | 51 | 15 | +36 | 36 | Qualification for the UEFA Champions League league phase |
| 2 | Real Madrid | 13 | 11 | 0 | 2 | 33 | 11 | +22 | 33 | Qualification for the UEFA Champions League league phase |
| 3 | Atlético Madrid | 12 | 9 | 1 | 2 | 23 | 10 | +13 | 28 | Qualification for the UEFA Champions League league phase |
| 4 | Real Betis | 13 | 8 | 3 | 2 | 21 | 16 | +5 | 27 | Qualification for the UEFA Champions League league phase |
| 5 | Real Sociedad | 13 | 7 | 1 | 5 | 23 | 23 | 0 | 22 | Qualification for the UEFA Europa League league phase |

Updated to match(es) played on 22 November 2026. Source: LaLiga EA Sports
Rules for classification: 1) Points; 2) Head-to-head points; 3) Head-to-head goal difference; 4) Goal difference; 5) Goals scored; 6) Fair-play points (if three or more teams tied); 7) Play-off at neutral site.
(Note: Head-to-head record is used only after all the matches between the teams in question have been played)

==== Results summary ====
| Overall | | | | | | | | Home | | | | | | Away | | | | | |
| Pld | W | D | L | GF | GA | GD | Pts | W | D | L | GF | GA | GD | W | D | L | GF | GA | GD |
|---|---|---|---|---|---|---|---|---|---|---|---|---|---|---|---|---|---|---|---|
| 13 | 12 | 0 | 1 | 51 | 15 | +36 | 36 | 6 | 0 | 1 | 27 | 9 | +18 | 6 | 0 | 0 | 24 | 6 | +18 |

Last updated: 22 November 2026.
Source: La Liga

==== Results by round ====
| Round | 2 | 1^{1} | 3 | 4 | 5 | 6 | 7 | 8 | 9 | 10 | 11 | 12 | 13 | 14 | 23^{2} | 15 | 16 | 17 | 18 | 19 | 20 | 21 | 22 | 24 | 25 | 26 | 27 | 28 | 29 | 30 | 31 | 32 | 33 | 34 | 35 | 36 | 37 | 38 |
|---|---|---|---|---|---|---|---|---|---|---|---|---|---|---|---|---|---|---|---|---|---|---|---|---|---|---|---|---|---|---|---|---|---|---|---|---|---|---|
| Ground | A | H | H | A | A | H | A | H | A | H | H | A | H | A | H | H | A | H | A | A | H | A | H | A | H | A | H | H | A | H | A | H | A | H | A | A | H | A |
| Result | W | W | W | W | W | W | W | W | W | L | W | W | W | | | | | | | | | | | | | | | | | | | | | | | | | |
| Position | 4 | 1 | 1 | 1 | 1 | 1 | 1 | 1 | 1 | 1 | 1 | 1 | 1 | | | | | | | | | | | | | | | | | | | | | | | | | |
| Points | 3 | 6 | 9 | 12 | 15 | 18 | 21 | 24 | 27 | 27 | 30 | 33 | 36 | | | | | | | | | | | | | | | | | | | | | | | | | |

Updated to match(es) played on 22 November 2026. Source: La Liga
A = Away; H = Home; W = Win; D = Draw; L = Loss; P = Postponed

^{1} Matchday 1 was rescheduled to allow players participating in the 2026 FIFA World Cup ample time for rest.
^{2} Matchday 23 was brought forward due to both clubs' involvement in the 2027 Supercopa de España.

==== Matches ====
| 23 August 2026 2 | Elche | 0–5 | Barcelona | Elche |
| 21:30 CEST (UTC+2) | Houary (yellow card) 33' | Report | Raphinha 14' (pen.), 67'; Adeyemi 45+3'; Fermín 71', 79' | Stadium: Martínez Valero; Attendance: 30,704; Referee: Alejandro Quintero González |

| 27 August 2026 1 | Barcelona | 2–0 | Athletic Bilbao | Barcelona |
| 21:00 CEST (UTC+2) | Espart (yellow card) 27'; Raphinha 37'; Fermín 82' | Report | Guruzeta (yellow card) 48'; Louis-Jean (yellow card) 61' | Stadium: Camp Nou; Attendance: 59,326; Referee: Miguel Ángel Ortiz Arias |
Note: Matchday 1 was rescheduled to allow players participating in the 2026 FIFA World Cup ample time for rest.

| 31 August 2026 3 | Barcelona | 5–2 | Rayo Vallecano | Barcelona |
| 21:30 CEST (UTC+2) | Raphinha 19', 71'; Yamal 21', 90'; Lejeune 51' (o.g.) | Report | Camello 12', 59'; Pedrosa (yellow card) 90' | Stadium: Camp Nou; Attendance: 57,768; Referee: Francisco José Hernández Maeso |

| 6 September 2026 4 | Valencia | 0–5 | Barcelona | Valencia |
| 16:15 CEST (UTC+2) | Martínez (yellow card) 81' | Report | Yamal 6', 84'; Fermín 22', (yellow card) 65'; Cubarsí (yellow card) 45+3'; Rodri (yellow card) 47'; Raphinha 50'; Pedri 79' | Stadium: Mestalla; Attendance: 47,319; Referee: Isidro Díaz de Mera Escuderos |

| 13 September 2026 5 | Levante | 2–4 | Barcelona | Valencia |
| 16:15 CEST (UTC+2) | Sotelo (yellow card) 45+5'; Romero 79'; Brugué 88' | Report | Espart 5'; Yamal 19', 48' (pen.); Martín (yellow card) 45+1'; Adeyemi 90+3' | Stadium: Ciutat de València; Attendance: 23,630; Referee: Jon Ander González Esteban |

| 16 September 2026 6 | Barcelona | 7–2 | Racing Santander | Barcelona |
| 21:30 CEST (UTC+2) | Cancelo 8', (yellow card) 69'; Raphinha 25' (pen.), 42', 67' (pen.); Villalibre 36' (o.g.); Yamal (penalty missed) 45', (yellow card) 45+5', (goal) 89'; Adeyemi (yellow card) 60'; Gabriel Jesus 79' | Report | Pedro Felipe (yellow card) 23'; Gueye 30'; Zabiri (yellow card) 60', (goal) 65' | Stadium: Camp Nou; Attendance: 50,568; Referee: José Luis Munuera Montero |

| 19 September 2026 7 | Sevilla | 1–3 | Barcelona | Seville |
| 21:00 CEST (UTC+2) | Fofana 19'; Agoumé (yellow card) 80' | Report | Raphinha 22', 52', 69' | Stadium: Ramón Sánchez-Pizjuán; Attendance: 41,145; Referee: Juan Martínez Munuera |

| 10 October 2026 8 | Barcelona | 3–0 | Getafe | Barcelona |
| 18:30 CEST (UTC+2) | Gordon 2'; Gabriel Jesus 30'; Olmo (yellow card) 46'; Koundé 73'; Fermín (yellow card) 90+1' | Report | Femenía (yellow card) 34'; Mojica (yellow card) 45+2'; Boselli (yellow card) 71'; Terrats (yellow card) 75' | Stadium: Camp Nou; Attendance: 59,463; Referee: Jesús Gil Manzano |

| 17 October 2026 9 | Real Betis | 2–5 | Barcelona | Seville |
| 18:30 CEST (UTC+2) | Bellerín (yellow card) 22'; Gómez 27'; Ezzalzouli 53'; Bernal (yellow card) 53', (red card) 54'; Llorente (yellow card) 61' | Report | Yamal 10', (yellow card) 55'; Fermín (yellow card) 20'; Rodri 41'; Gabriel Jesus 51'; E. Garcia 62'; Olmo 81' | Stadium: La Cartuja; Attendance: 66,924; Referee: Ricardo de Burgos Bengoetxea |

| 25 October 2026 10 | Barcelona | 1–2 | Real Madrid | Barcelona |
| 21:00 CET (UTC+1) | Raphinha 61'; Gordon (yellow card) 84'; Adeyemi (yellow card) 90+6'; Balde (yellow card) 90+6' | Report | Mbappé 41', 87', (yellow card) 90+4'; Tchouaméni (yellow card) 46'; Cucurella (yellow card) 90+2' | Stadium: Camp Nou; Attendance: 62,055; Referee: Juan Martínez Munuera |

| 31 October 2026 11 | Barcelona | 6–1 | Alavés | Barcelona |
| 21:00 CET (UTC+1) | Raphinha 8', 41'; Fermín 23'; Pedri (yellow card) 40'; Yamal 45+1', 64'; Cancelo (yellow card) 57'; Gordon 81' | Report | Protesoni (yellow card) 27'; Pérez (yellow card) 45+3'; Ibáñez (yellow card) 60'; Mariano 84' | Stadium: Camp Nou; Attendance: 53,523; Referee: Adrián Cordero Vega |

| 8 November 2026 12 | Atlético Madrid | 1–2 | Barcelona | Madrid |
| 21:00 CET (UTC+1) | Simeone 10'; Baena (yellow card) 43'; Llorente (yellow card) 87'; Pubill (yellow card) 88' | Report | Fermín 45', 66'; Bernal (yellow card) 74' | Stadium: Riyadh Air Metropolitano; Attendance: 69,788; Referee: Javier Alberola Rojas |

| 22 November 2026 13 | Barcelona | 3–2 | Villarreal | Barcelona |
| 14:00 CET (UTC+1) | Yamal (penalty missed) 23'; Martín 57'; Fermín 61' (red card) 75'; Navarro 67' (o.g.); Raphinha (yellow card) 76'; Bernal (yellow card) 80' | Report | Buchanan 5'; Oluwaseyi 7'; Gueye (yellow card) 11'; Moleiro (yellow card) 32'; Navarro (yellow card) 47' (yellow-red card) 90+3'; Freeman (yellow card) 49'; Romero (yellow card) 63' | Stadium: Camp Nou; Attendance: 59,034; Referee: Alejandro Hernández Hernández |
Note: Fermín's red card was after the player had been substituted in 68th minute.

| 29 November 2026 14 | Deportivo A Coruña | v | Barcelona | A Coruña |
| --:-- CET (UTC+1) | | Report | | Stadium: ABANCA-Riazor |

| 2 December 2026 23 | Barcelona | v | Atlético Madrid | Barcelona |
| 21:30CET (UTC+1) | | Report | | Stadium: Camp Nou |
Note: Brought forward due to both clubs' involvement in the 2027 Supercopa de España.

| 6 December 2026 15 | Barcelona | v | Celta Vigo | Barcelona |
| --:-- CEST (UTC+2) | | Report | | Stadium: Camp Nou |

| 13 December 2026 16 | Málaga | v | Barcelona | Málaga |
| --:-- CET (UTC+1) | | Report | | Stadium: La Rosaleda |

| 20 December 2026 17 | Barcelona | v | Real Sociedad | Barcelona |
| --:-- CET (UTC+1) | | Report | | Stadium: Camp Nou |

| 3 January 2027 18 | Espanyol | v | Barcelona | Cornellà de Llobregat |
| --:-- CET (UTC+1) | | Report | | Stadium: Cornellà-El Prat |

| 10 January 2027 19 | Osasuna | v | Barcelona | Pamplona |
| --:-- CET (UTC+1) | | Report | | Stadium: El Sadar |

| 17 January 2027 20 | Barcelona | v | Elche | Barcelona |
| --:-- CET (UTC+1) | | Report | | Stadium: Camp Nou |

| 24 January 2027 21 | Alavés | v | Barcelona | Vitoria-Gasteiz |
| --:-- CET (UTC+1) | | Report | | Stadium: Mendizorrotza |

| 31 January 2027 22 | Barcelona | v | Valencia | Barcelona |
| --:-- CET (UTC+1) | | Report | | Stadium: Camp Nou |

| 14 February 2027 24 | Villarreal | v | Barcelona | Villarreal |
| --:-- CET (UTC+1) | | Report | | Stadium: La Cerámica |

| 21 February 2027 25 | Barcelona | v | Levante | Barcelona |
| --:-- CET (UTC+1) | | Report | | Stadium: Camp Nou |

| 28 February 2027 26 | Athletic Bilbao | v | Barcelona | Bilbao |
| --:-- CET (UTC+1) | | Report | | Stadium: San Mamés |

| 7 March 2027 27 | Barcelona | v | Real Betis | Barcelona |
| --:-- CET (UTC+1) | | Report | | Stadium: Camp Nou |

| 14 March 2027 28 | Barcelona | v | Deportivo A Coruña | Barcelona |
| --:-- CET (UTC+1) | | Report | | Stadium: Camp Nou |

| 21 March 2027 29 | Rayo Vallecano | v | Barcelona | Madrid |
| --:-- CET (UTC+1) | | Report | | Stadium: Vallecas |

| 4 April 2027 30 | Barcelona | v | Sevilla | Barcelona |
| --:-- CEST (UTC+2) | | Report | | Stadium: Camp Nou |

| 11 April 2027 31 | Racing Santander | v | Barcelona | Santander |
| --:-- CEST (UTC+2) | | Report | | Stadium: El Sardinero |

| 18 April 2027 32 | Barcelona | v | Espanyol | Barcelona |
| --:-- CEST (UTC+2) | | Report | | Stadium: Camp Nou |

| 21 April 2027 33 | Celta Vigo | v | Barcelona | Vigo |
| --:-- CEST (UTC+2) | | Report | | Stadium: ABANCA-Balaídos |

| 2 May 2027 34 | Barcelona | v | Osasuna | Barcelona |
| --:-- CEST (UTC+2) | | Report | | Stadium: Camp Nou |

| 9 May 2027 35 | Real Madrid | v | Barcelona | Madrid |
| --:-- CEST (UTC+2) | | Report | | Stadium: Bernabéu |

| 16 May 2027 36 | Real Sociedad | v | Barcelona | San Sebastián |
| --:-- CEST (UTC+2) | | Report | | Stadium: Anoeta |

| 23 May 2027 37 | Barcelona | v | Málaga | Barcelona |
| --:-- CEST (UTC+2) | | Report | | Stadium: Camp Nou |

| 30 May 2027 38 | Getafe | v | Barcelona | Getafe |
| --:-- CEST (UTC+2) | | Report | | Stadium: Coliseum |

=== Supercopa de España ===
| 2 February 2027 Semi-finals | Barcelona | v | Atlético Madrid | Istanbul, Turkey |
| 22:00 TRT (UTC+3) | | | | Stadium: Şükrü Saracoğlu Stadium |

=== UEFA Champions League ===
==== League phase ====
The draw for the league phase was held on 27 August 2026.

| Pos | Team | Pld | W | D | L | GF | GA | GD | Pts | Qualification |
|---|---|---|---|---|---|---|---|---|---|---|
| 3 | (England) Arsenal | 4 | 3 | 1 | 0 | 8 | 3 | +5 | 10 | Advance to round of 16 (seeded) |
| 4 | (Italy) Como | 4 | 3 | 0 | 1 | 19 | 6 | +13 | 9 | Advance to round of 16 (seeded) |
| 5 | (Spain) Barcelona | 4 | 3 | 0 | 1 | 14 | 6 | +8 | 9 | Advance to round of 16 (seeded) |
| 6 | (England) Aston Villa | 4 | 3 | 0 | 1 | 12 | 6 | +6 | 9 | Advance to round of 16 (seeded) |
| 7 | (England) Manchester City | 4 | 3 | 0 | 1 | 12 | 7 | +5 | 9 | Advance to round of 16 (seeded) |

Updated to match(es) played on 4 November 2026. Source: UEFA
Rules for classification: League phase tiebreakers

| Round | 1 | 2 | 3 | 4 | 5 | 6 | 7 | 8 |
|---|---|---|---|---|---|---|---|---|
| Ground | H | A | A | H | A | H | A | H |
| Result | W | W | L | W | | | | |
| Position | 3 | 2 | 8 | 5 | | | | |
| Points | 3 | 6 | 6 | 9 | | | | |

Updated to match(es) played on 3 November 2026. Source: UEFA
A = Away; H = Home; W = Win; D = Draw; L = Loss

===== Matches =====
| 9 September 2026 1 | Barcelona (Spain) | 5–1 | (Netherlands) Feyenoord | Barcelona, Spain |
| 18:45 CEST (UTC+2) | Raphinha 3', 57'; Adeyemi 22'; Olmo (yellow card) 54'; Yamal 77'; Gabriel Jesus 85' | Report | Vanhoutte (yellow card) 27'; Steijn 82' | Stadium: Camp Nou; Attendance: 45,838; Referee: Sven Jablonski (Germany) |

| 13 October 2026 2 | Galatasaray (Turkey) | 1–4 | (Spain) Barcelona | Istanbul, Turkey |
| 22:00 TRT (UTC+3) | Batrakov 28'; Leão (yellow card) 64'; Sallai (yellow card) 86' | Report | Cancelo 43'; Fermín 50'; Gordon 53'; Adeyemi 65' | Stadium: Rams Park; Attendance: 49,623; Referee: Marco Guida (Italy) |

| 20 October 2026 3 | Paris Saint-Germain (France) | 4–2 | (Spain) Barcelona | Paris, France |
| 21:00 CEST (UTC+2) | Doué 38'; Hernandez 72'; Vitinha 81'; Fabián 86' | Report | Cancelo (yellow card) 17'; Espart 55'; Yamal 79' | Stadium: Parc des Princes; Attendance: 47,221; Referee: Michael Oliver (England) |

| 3 November 2026 4 | Barcelona (Spain) | 3–0 | (England) Aston Villa | Barcelona, Spain |
| 21:00 CET (UTC+1) | Yamal 7'; Raphinha (yellow card) 44', (goal) 52', 64' | Report | Maatsen (yellow card) 11'; Buendía (yellow card) 31'; Jackson (yellow card) 44' | Stadium: Camp Nou; Attendance: 52,662; Referee: Davide Massa (Italy) |

| 25 November 2026 5 | Sabah (Azerbaijan) | v | (Spain) Barcelona | Baku, Azerbaijan |
| 21:45 AZT UTC+4) | | Report | | Stadium: Baku Olympic Stadium |

| 8 December 2026 6 | Barcelona (Spain) | v | (England) Manchester City | Barcelona, Spain |
| 21:00 CET (UTC+1) | | Report | | Stadium: Camp Nou |

| 20 January 2027 7 | Sporting CP (Portugal) | v | (Spain) Barcelona | Lisbon, Portugal |
| 20:00 WET (UTC+0) | | Report | | Stadium: Estádio José Alvalade |

| 27 January 2027 8 | Barcelona (Spain) | v | (Italy) Como | Barcelona, Spain |
| 21:00 CET (UTC+1) | | Report | | Stadium: Camp Nou |

== Statistics ==
=== Overall ===
| No. | Pos. | Nat. | Player | La Liga | | Copa del Rey | | Supercopa de España | | Champions League | | Total | | Discipline | | Notes |
| No. | Pos. | Nat. | Player | Apps | Goals | Apps | Goals | Apps | Goals | Apps | Goals | Apps | Goals | Yellow card | Red card | Notes |
Goalkeepers
| 1 | GK | (Spain) | Joan Garcia | 12 | 0 | 0 | 0 | 0 | 0 | 4 | 0 | 16 | 0 | 0 | 0 | |
| 13 | GK | (Poland) | Wojciech Szczęsny | 0+1 | 0 | 0 | 0 | 0 | 0 | 0 | 0 | 1 | 0 | 0 | 0 | |
| 25 | GK | (Croatia) | Dominik Livaković | 1 | 0 | 0 | 0 | 0 | 0 | 0 | 0 | 1 | 0 | 0 | 0 | |
Defenders
| 2 | DF | (Portugal) | João Cancelo | 6+4 | 1 | 0 | 0 | 0 | 0 | 4 | 1 | 14 | 2 | 3 | 0 | |
| 3 | DF | (Spain) | Alejandro Balde | 0+3 | 0 | 0 | 0 | 0 | 0 | 0+2 | 0 | 5 | 0 | 1 | 0 | |
| 5 | DF | (Spain) | Pau Cubarsí | 9 | 0 | 0 | 0 | 0 | 0 | 4 | 0 | 13 | 0 | 1 | 0 | |
| 12 | DF | (Spain) | Xavi Espart | 8 | 1 | 0 | 0 | 0 | 0 | 1 | 1 | 9 | 2 | 1 | 0 | |
| 15 | DF | (Denmark) | Andreas Christensen | 5+2 | 0 | 0 | 0 | 0 | 0 | 1 | 0 | 8 | 0 | 0 | 0 | |
| 18 | DF | (Spain) | Gerard Martín | 10+2 | 1 | 0 | 0 | 0 | 0 | 3 | 0 | 15 | 1 | 1 | 0 | |
| 23 | DF | (France) | Jules Koundé | 3+4 | 1 | 0 | 0 | 0 | 0 | 1+1 | 0 | 9 | 1 | 0 | 0 | |
| 24 | DF | (Spain) | Eric García | 8+2 | 1 | 0 | 0 | 0 | 0 | 1 | 0 | 11 | 1 | 0 | 0 | |
Midfielders
| 4 | MF | (Spain) | Brian Fariñas | 2 | 0 | 0 | 0 | 0 | 0 | 1 | 0 | 3 | 0 | 0 | 0 | |
| 6 | MF | (Spain) | Gavi | 2+4 | 0 | 0 | 0 | 0 | 0 | 0+4 | 0 | 10 | 0 | 0 | 0 | |
| 7 | MF | (Spain) | Fermín López | 10+2 | 8 | 0 | 0 | 0 | 0 | 2+2 | 1 | 16 | 9 | 3 | 0 | |
| 8 | MF | (Spain) | Pedri | 11+2 | 1 | 0 | 0 | 0 | 0 | 4 | 0 | 17 | 1 | 1 | 0 | |
| 16 | MF | (Spain) | Rodri | 8+2 | 1 | 0 | 0 | 0 | 0 | 3+1 | 0 | 14 | 1 | 1 | 0 | |
| 20 | MF | (Spain) | Dani Olmo | 3+7 | 1 | 0 | 0 | 0 | 0 | 3 | 0 | 13 | 1 | 2 | 0 | |
| 21 | MF | (Netherlands) | Frenkie de Jong | 2+2 | 0 | 0 | 0 | 0 | 0 | 0+1 | 0 | 5 | 0 | 0 | 0 | |
| 22 | MF | (Spain) | Marc Bernal | 5+6 | 0 | 0 | 0 | 0 | 0 | 1+3 | 0 | 15 | 0 | 1 | 0 | |
Forwards
| 9 | FW | (Brazil) | Gabriel Jesus | 2+5 | 3 | 0 | 0 | 0 | 0 | 0+3 | 1 | 10 | 4 | 0 | 0 | |
| 10 | FW | (Spain) | Lamine Yamal | 13 | 10 | 0 | 0 | 0 | 0 | 4 | 3 | 17 | 13 | 2 | 0 | |
| 11 | FW | (Brazil) | Raphinha | 11+1 | 15 | 0 | 0 | 0 | 0 | 3 | 4 | 15 | 19 | 1 | 0 | |
| 14 | FW | (Germany) | Karim Adeyemi | 5+8 | 2 | 0 | 0 | 0 | 0 | 1+2 | 2 | 16 | 4 | 2 | 0 | |
| 17 | FW | (England) | Anthony Gordon | 8+4 | 2 | 0 | 0 | 0 | 0 | 3+1 | 1 | 16 | 3 | 1 | 0 | |
| 19 | FW | (Sweden) | Roony Bardghji | 0 | 0 | 0 | 0 | 0 | 0 | 0 | 0 | 0 | 0 | 0 | 0 | |
| 29 | FW | (Egypt) | Hamza Abdelkarim | 0+2 | 0 | 0 | 0 | 0 | 0 | 0 | 0 | 2 | 0 | 0 | 0 | |
No longer with club

Last updated: 22 November 2026
Source: FBREF

=== Goalscorers ===
| Rank | No. | Pos. | Nat. | Player | La Liga | Copa del Rey | Supercopa de España | Champions League | Total |
|---|---|---|---|---|---|---|---|---|---|
| 1 | 11 | FW | (Brazil) | Raphinha | 15 | — | — | 4 | 19 |
| 2 | 10 | FW | (Spain) | Lamine Yamal | 10 | — | — | 3 | 13 |
| 3 | 7 | MF | (Spain) | Fermín López | 8 | — | — | 1 | 9 |
| 4 | 9 | FW | (Brazil) | Gabriel Jesus | 3 | — | — | 1 | 4 |
| 4 | 14 | FW | (Germany) | Karim Adeyemi | 2 | — | — | 2 | 4 |
| 6 | 17 | FW | (England) | Anthony Gordon | 2 | — | — | 1 | 3 |
| 7 | 2 | DF | (Portugal) | João Cancelo | 1 | — | — | 1 | 2 |
| 7 | 12 | DF | (Spain) | Xavi Espart | 1 | — | — | 1 | 2 |
| 9 | 8 | MF | (Spain) | Pedri | 1 | — | — | — | 1 |
| 9 | 16 | MF | (Spain) | Rodri | 1 | — | — | — | 1 |
| 9 | 20 | MF | (Spain) | Dani Olmo | 1 | — | — | — | 1 |
| 9 | 18 | DF | (Spain) | Gerard Martín | 1 | — | — | — | 1 |
| 9 | 23 | DF | (France) | Jules Koundé | 1 | — | — | — | 1 |
| 9 | 24 | DF | (Spain) | Eric Garcia | 1 | — | — | — | 1 |
| Own goals | | | | | 3 | — | — | — | 3 |
| Totals | | | | | 51 | — | — | 14 | 65 |

=== Assists ===
| Rank | No. | Pos. | Nat. | Player | La Liga | Copa del Rey | Supercopa de España | Champions League | Total |
|---|---|---|---|---|---|---|---|---|---|
| 1 | 10 | FW | (Spain) | Lamine Yamal | 9 | — | — | 4 | 13 |
| 2 | 7 | MF | (Spain) | Fermín López | 5 | — | — | 2 | 7 |
| 3 | 8 | MF | (Spain) | Pedri | 3 | — | — | 1 | 4 |
| 3 | 20 | MF | (Spain) | Dani Olmo | 3 | — | — | 1 | 4 |
| 3 | 17 | FW | (England) | Anthony Gordon | 4 | — | — | — | 4 |
| 6 | 2 | DF | (Portugal) | João Cancelo | 1 | — | — | 2 | 3 |
| 6 | 11 | FW | (Brazil) | Raphinha | 3 | — | — | — | 3 |
| 8 | 5 | DF | (Spain) | Pau Cubarsí | 2 | — | — | — | 2 |
| 8 | 12 | DF | (Spain) | Xavi Espart | 2 | — | — | — | 2 |
| 8 | 22 | MF | (Spain) | Marc Bernal | 2 | — | — | — | 2 |
| 8 | 9 | FW | (Brazil) | Gabriel Jesus | 1 | — | — | 1 | 2 |
| 8 | 14 | FW | (Germany) | Karim Adeyemi | 2 | — | — | — | 2 |
| 13 | 15 | DF | (Denmark) | Andreas Christensen | 1 | — | — | — | 1 |
| 13 | 23 | DF | (France) | Jules Koundé | 1 | — | — | — | 1 |
| 13 | 16 | MF | (Spain) | Rodri | 1 | — | — | — | 1 |
| Totals | | | | | 40 | — | — | 11 | 51 |

=== Hat-tricks ===
| Date | No. | Pos. | Nat. | Player | Opponent | Minutes | Score after goals | Result | Competition | Source |
|---|---|---|---|---|---|---|---|---|---|---|
| 16 September 2026 | 11 | FW | (Brazil) | Raphinha | Racing Santander | 25', 42', 67' | 2–0, 4–1, 5–2 | 7–2 (H) | La Liga | |
| 19 September 2026 | 11 | FW | (Brazil) | Raphinha | Sevilla | 22', 52', 69' | 1–1, 1–2, 1–3 | 1–3 (A) | La Liga | |

(H) – Home; (A) – Away

=== Clean sheets ===
| Rank | No. | Nat. | Player | La Liga | Copa del Rey | Supercopa de España | Champions League | Total |
|---|---|---|---|---|---|---|---|---|
| 1 | 1 | (Spain) | Joan Garcia | 4 | — | — | 1 | 5 |
| 2 | 13 | (Poland) | Wojciech Szczęsny | 0 | — | — | — | 0 |
| 2 | 25 | (Croatia) | Dominik Livaković | 0 | — | — | — | 0 |
| Totals | | | | 4 | — | — | 1 | 5 |

=== Disciplinary record ===
| No. | Pos. | Nat. | Player | La Liga | | | Copa del Rey | | | Supercopa de España | | | Champions League | | | Total | | |
| No. | Pos. | Nat. | Player | Yellow card | (yellow card) (yellow-red card) | Red card | Yellow card | (yellow card) (yellow-red card) | Red card | Yellow card | (yellow card) (yellow-red card) | Red card | Yellow card | (yellow card) (yellow-red card) | Red card | Yellow card | (yellow card) (yellow-red card) | Red card |
|---|---|---|---|---|---|---|---|---|---|---|---|---|---|---|---|---|---|---|
| 7 | MF | (Spain) | Fermín López | 3 | | 1 | | | | | | | | | | 3 | | 1 |
| 2 | DF | (Portugal) | João Cancelo | 2 | | | | | | | | | 1 | | | 3 | | |
| 20 | MF | (Spain) | Dani Olmo | 1 | | | | | | | | | 1 | | | 2 | | |
| 22 | MF | (Spain) | Marc Bernal | 2 | | | | | | | | | | | | 2 | | |
| 10 | FW | (Spain) | Lamine Yamal | 2 | | | | | | | | | | | | 2 | | |
| 11 | FW | (Brazil) | Raphina | 1 | | | | | | | | | 1 | | | 2 | | |
| 14 | FW | (Germany) | Karim Adeyemi | 2 | | | | | | | | | | | | 2 | | |
| 3 | DF | (Spain) | Alejandro Balde | 1 | | | | | | | | | | | | 1 | | |
| 5 | DF | (Spain) | Pau Cubarsí | 1 | | | | | | | | | | | | 1 | | |
| 12 | DF | (Spain) | Xavi Espart | 1 | | | | | | | | | | | | 1 | | |
| 18 | DF | (Spain) | Gerard Martín | 1 | | | | | | | | | | | | 1 | | |
| 8 | MF | (Spain) | Pedri | 1 | | | | | | | | | | | | 1 | | |
| 16 | MF | (Spain) | Rodri | 1 | | | | | | | | | | | | 1 | | |
| 17 | FW | (England) | Anthony Gordon | 1 | | | | | | | | | | | | 1 | | |
| Coach | | (Germany) | Hansi Flick | 1 | | | | | | | | | | | | 1 | | |
| Totals | | | | 21 | | 1 | | | | | | | 3 | | | 24 | | 1 |

Source: FC Barcelona
Ordered by (red card) , (second yellow card) and (yellow card)
(yellow card) = Number of bookings; (second yellow card) = Number of sending offs after a second yellow card; (red card) = Number of sending offs by a direct red card.

=== Injury record ===
| No. | Pos. | Nat. | Name | Type | Status | Source | Match | Inj. Date | Ret. Date | Injured days |
|---|---|---|---|---|---|---|---|---|---|---|
| 21 | MF | (Netherlands) | Frenkie de Jong | Medial collateral ligament tear — right knee | | FCB.com | in World Cup with Netherlands vs Morocco | 29 June 2026 | 17 October 2026 | 110 |
| 19 | FW | (Sweden) | Roony Bardghji | Anterior cruciate ligament rupture — right knee | | FCB.com | in training | 10 August 2026 | | 104 |
| 6 | MF | (Spain) | Gavi | Bruise — right knee | | FCB.com | vs Elche | 23 August 2026 | 9 September 2026 | 17 |
| 1 | GK | (Spain) | Joan Garcia | Bruise — right knee | | FCB.com | vs Racing Santander | 16 September 2026 | 10 October 2026 | 24 |
| 15 | DF | (Denmark) | Andreas Christensen | Strain — left thigh | | FCB.com | vs Sevilla | 19 September 2026 | 8 November 2026 | 50 |
| 11 | FW | (Brazil) | Raphinha | Edema — right thigh | | FCB.com | with Brazil vs Australia | 29 September 2026 | 17 October 2026 | 18 |
| 24 | DF | (Spain) | Eric Garcia | Rectus femoris muscle tear — right thigh | | FCB.com | vs Real Betis | 17 October 2026 | 8 November 2026 | 22 |
| 23 | DF | (France) | Jules Koundé | Sprain — left ankle | | FCB.com | vs Real Betis | 17 October 2026 | 22 November 2026 | 36 |
| 20 | MF | (Spain) | Dani Olmo | Adductor muscle tear — left thigh | | FCB.com | vs Paris Saint-Germain | 20 October 2026 | 22 November 2026 | 33 |
| 12 | DF | (Spain) | Xavi Espart | Syndesmosis tear — right ankle | | FCB.com | vs Real Madrid | 25 October 2026 | | 28 |
| 16 | MF | (Spain) | Rodri | Biceps femoris muscle tear — right thigh | | FCB.com | vs Aston Villa | 3 November 2026 | | 19 |
| 21 | MF | (Netherlands) | Frenkie de Jong | External obturator muscle strain | | FCB.com | in Nations League with Netherlands vs Greece | 13 November 2026 | 22 November 2026 | 9 |
| 5 | DF | (Spain) | Pau Cubarsí | Iliopsoas muscle tightness | | FCB.com | in Nations League with Spain vs England | 15 November 2026 | 22 November 2026 | 7 |
| 15 | DF | (Denmark) | Andreas Christensen | Soleus muscle discomfort — left leg | | FCB.com | in training | 19 November 2026 | | 3 |

- Player is injured
- Player has recovered from injury
Last updated: 22 November 2026
Source: FC Barcelona

== Milestones ==
=== Debuts ===
The following players made their competitive debuts for the first team during the campaign.

Legend

– Indicates youth academy debut.

| Date | No. | Pos. | Nat. | Player | Age | Final score | Opponent | Competition | Source |
|---|---|---|---|---|---|---|---|---|---|
| 23 August 2026 | 14 | FW | (Germany) | Karim Adeyemi (Note: Adeyemi scored first goal in debut.) | 24 | 0–5 (A) | Elche | La Liga | |
| 23 August 2026 | 17 | FW | (England) | Anthony Gordon | 25 | 0–5 (A) | Elche | La Liga | |
| 27 August 2026 | 16 | MF | (Spain) | Rodri | 30 | 2–0 (H) | Athletic Bilbao | La Liga | |
| 31 August 2026 | 29 | FW | (Egypt) | Hamza Abdelkarim | 18 | 5–2 (H) | Rayo Vallecano | La Liga | |
| 6 September 2026 | 9 | FW | (Brazil) | Gabriel Jesus | 29 | 0–5 (A) | Valencia | La Liga | |
| 19 September 2026 | 25 | GK | (Croatia) | Dominik Livaković | 31 | 1–3 (A) | Sevilla | La Liga | |
| 31 October 2026 | 4 | MF | (Spain) | Brian Fariñas | 20 | 6–1 (H) | Alavés | La Liga | |

(H) – Home; (A) – Away

=== Appearances ===
The following players made their 100th, 150th, 200th, 250th or 300th for Barcelona's first team during the campaign.

| Date | No. | Pos. | Nat. | Name | Age | Final score | Opponent | Competition | Source |
100th appearances
| 31 August 2026 | 15 | DF | (Denmark) | Andreas Christensen | 30 | 5–2 (H) | Rayo Vallecano | La Liga | |
| 10 October 2026 | 18 | DF | (Spain) | Gerard Martín | 24 | 3–0 (H) | Getafe | La Liga | |
| 20 October 2026 | 20 | MF | (Spain) | Dani Olmo | 28 | 4–2 (A) | Paris Saint-Germain | Champions League | |
150th appearances
| 3 November 2026 | 7 | MF | (Spain) | Fermín López | 23 | 3–0 (H) | Aston Villa | Champions League | |
250th appearances
| 9 September 2026 | 8 | MF | (Spain) | Pedri | 23 | 5–1 (H) | Feyenoord | Champions League | |
300th appearances
| 3 November 2026 | 21 | MF | (Netherlands) | Frenkie de Jong | 29 | 3–0 (H) | Aston Villa | Champions League | |

(H) – Home; (A) – Away

=== First goals ===
The following players scored their first goals for Barcelona's first team during the campaign.

| Date | No. | Pos. | Nat. | Name | Age | Score | Final score | Opponent | Competition | Source |
|---|---|---|---|---|---|---|---|---|---|---|
| 23 August 2026 | 14 | FW | (Germany) | Karim Adeyemi | 24 | 0–2 (Note: This goal was scored on his debut.) (A) | 0–5 (A) | Elche | La Liga | |
| 9 September 2026 | 9 | FW | (Brazil) | Gabriel Jesus | 29 | 5–1 (H) | 5–1 (H) | Feyenoord | Champions League | |
| 13 September 2026 | 12 | DF | (Spain) | Xavi Espart | 19 | 0–1 (A) | 2–4 (A) | Levante | La Liga | |
| 10 October 2026 | 17 | FW | (England) | Anthony Gordon | 25 | 1–0 (H) | 3–0 (H) | Getafe | La Liga | |
| 17 October 2026 | 16 | MF | (Spain) | Rodri | 30 | 1–2 (A) | 2–5 (A) | Real Betis | La Liga | |

(H) – Home; (A) – Away

=== Goals ===
The following players scored their 50th or 100th competitive goals for Barcelona's first team during the campaign.

| Date | No. | Pos. | Nat. | Name | Age | Apps to milestone | Score | Final score | Opponent | Competition | Source |
50th goal
| 31 August 2026 | 10 | FW | (Spain) | Lamine Yamal | 19 | 154 | 2–1 (H) | 5–2 (H) | Rayo Vallecano | La Liga | |

(H) – Home; (A) – Away

=== First starts as captain ===
The following players made their first starts as captain of Barcelona's first team during the campaign.

| Date | No. | Pos. | Nat. | Name | Age | Final score | Opponent | Competition | Source |

(H) – Home; (A) – Away

== Awards ==
=== Monthly awards ===
| Name | Position | Award | Ref. |
August
| (Brazil) Raphinha | Forward | La Liga Player of the Month (2nd award) | |
September
| (Germany) Hansi Flick | Manager | La Liga Manager of the Month (5th award) | |
| (Brazil) Raphinha | Forward | La Liga Player of the Month (3rd award) | |
| (Portugal) João Cancelo | Defender | La Liga Goal of the Month (2nd award – shared record) | |
October
| (Spain) Lamine Yamal | Forward | La Liga Goal of the Month (2nd award – shared record) | |

=== Annual awards ===
| Player | Position | Award | Ref. |
|---|---|---|---|
| (Spain) Pau Cubarsí | Defender | Premi Barça Jugadors 2025–26 | |
| (Spain) Lamine Yamal | Forward | AFE Awards – Best Primera División player 2025–26 (2nd award – record) | |
| (Spain) Pau Cubarsí | Defender | Memorial Aldo Rovira Award 2025–26 | |
| (Spain) Lamine Yamal | Forward | Kopa Trophy 2026 (3rd award – record) | |
| (Germany) Hansi Flick | Manager | Ramblista d'Honor 2026 | |
| (Spain) Pau Cubarsí | Defender | FIFPRO Men's World XI 2026 | |
| (Spain) Rodri | Midfielder | FIFPRO Men's World XI 2026 (2nd appearance) | |
| (Spain) Lamine Yamal | Forward | FIFPRO Men's World XI 2026 (2nd appearance) | |
| (Spain) Pau Cubarsí | Defender | Golden Boy 2026 | |
| (Germany) Hansi Flick | Manager | Sport Values Award 2026 | |
