= Brian Fariñas =

Spanish footballer (born 2006)

Personal information
- Full name: Brian Fariñas Pérez
- Date of birth: 9 February 2006 (age 20)
- Place of birth: Benicarló, Spain
- Height: 1.80 m (5 ft 11 in)
- Positions: Central midfielder; right-back

Team information
- Current team: Barcelona
- Number: 4

Youth career
- 2013–2018: Villarreal
- 2018–2025: Barcelona

Senior career*
Years	Team	Apps	(Gls)
2024–2026	Barcelona B	42	(5)
2026–	Barcelona	2	(0)
- * Club domestic league appearances and goals as of 8 November 2026

Brian Fariñas Pérez (born 9 February 2006) is a Spanish professional footballer who plays as a central midfielder or right-back for La Liga club Barcelona.

== Career ==
Born in Benicarló, Castellón, Valencian Community, Fariñas started playing football for a school in his hometown, before joining Villarreal where he played for five years. Impressing within the youth ranks, he was soon consulted by Barcelona with a few meetings before announcing his signing in July 2018. After four years with the club, Fariñas renewed his contract with Barcelona, having been promoted to the Juvenil A squad for the 2023–24 season. He made his debut for the reserves in Primera Federación on 16 March 2024, coming off the bench in a 2–4 away win against Teruel. Ahead of the 2025–26 season, Fariñas was named as one of the four captains for Barcelona Atlètic.

On 1 September 2026, Fariñas was promoted to the first team after impressing head coach Hansi Flick during the 2026 pre-season. He made his first-team debut on 31 October in a 6–1 league victory over Alavés.

== Career statistics ==
As of match played 8 November 2026

Appearances and goals by club, season and competition
Club	Season	League			National cup		Continental		Other		Total	
Club	Season	Division	Apps	Goals	Apps	Goals	Apps	Goals	Apps	Goals	Apps	Goals
Barcelona Atlètic	2023–24	Primera Federación	2	0	—		—		—		2	0
Barcelona Atlètic	2024–25	Primera Federación	7	0	—		—		—		7	0
Barcelona Atlètic	2025–26	Segunda Federación	33	5	—		—		—		33	5
Barcelona Atlètic	Total		42	5	0	0	0	0	0	0	42	5
Barcelona	2026–27	La Liga	2	0	0	0	1	0	0	0	3	0
Career total			44	5	0	0	1	0	0	0	45	5

== Honours ==
Barcelona

- UEFA Youth League: 2024–25
