= UD Tegueste =

Association football club in Spain

Tegueste
- Full name: Unión Deportiva Tegueste
- Founded: 1958
- Dissolved: 2012
- Ground: Los Laureles, Tegueste, Canary Islands, Spain
- Capacity: 2,000
- 2011–12: Interinsular Preferente, 16th of 18
Home colours	Away colours

Unión Deportiva Tegueste was a football team based in Tegueste, in the Canary Islands. Founded in 1958 and dissolved in 2012, it last played in the Interinsular Preferente. Its home stadium is Estadio Los Laureles with a capacity of 2,000 seats.

== Season to season ==
Season	Tier	Division	Place	Copa del Rey
1965–66	6	3ª Reg.		
1966–67	6	3ª Reg.		
1967–68	6	3ª Reg.		
1968–69	DNP			
1969–70	6	3ª Reg.		
1970–71	6	3ª Reg.	4th	
1971–72	6	3ª Reg.		
1972–73	6	3ª Reg.	8th	
1973–74	6	3ª Reg.		
1974–75	6	3ª Reg.		
1975–76	6	3ª Reg.		
1976–77	6	3ª Reg.		
1977–78	7	3ª Reg.	13th	
1978–79	7	2ª Reg.		
1979–80	7	2ª Reg.		
1980–81	7	2ª Reg.	7th	
1981–82	7	2ª Reg.		
1982–83	7	2ª Reg.	14th	
1983–84	7	2ª Terr.		
1984–85	7	2ª Terr.	11th	

Season	Tier	Division	Place	Copa del Rey
1985–86	7	2ª Terr.	5th	
1986–87	7	2ª Terr.	10th	
1987–88	7	2ª Terr.	2nd	
1988–89	7	2ª Terr.	2nd	
1989–90	6	1ª Terr.	11th	
1990–91	6	1ª Terr.	12th	
1991–92	6	1ª Terr.	9th	
1992–93	6	1ª Terr.	3rd	
1993–94	5	Int. Pref.	8th	
1994–95	5	Int. Pref.	15th	
1995–96	6	1ª Terr.	4th	
1996–97	6	1ª Terr.	15th	
1997–98	7	2ª Terr.	10th	
1998–99	7	2ª Terr.	2nd	
1999–2000	6	1ª Terr.	2nd	
2000–01	5	Int. Pref.	14th	
2001–02	5	Int. Pref.	9th	
2002–03	5	Int. Pref.	15th	
2003–04	5	Int. Pref.	1st	
2004–05	4	3ª	13th	

Season	Tier	Division	Place	Copa del Rey
2005–06	4	3ª	15th	
2006–07	4	3ª	14th	
2007–08	4	3ª	15th	
2008–09	4	3ª	18th	
2009–10	5	Int. Pref.	10th	
2010–11	5	Int. Pref.	12th	
2011–12	5	Int. Pref.	16th	

- 5 seasons in Tercera División
