= 2027 Supercopa de España =

Spanish football competition played in Turkey

Tournament details
- Host country: Turkey
- Dates: 2–6 February 2027
- Teams: 4
- Venues: 3 (in 1 host city)

The 2027 Supercopa de España will be the 43rd edition of the Supercopa de España, an annual football competition for clubs in the Spanish football league system that were successful in its major competitions in the preceding season.

The Supercopa was supposed to be held in Saudi Arabia, as it had in 2020 and every year since 2022 in a deal that lasts until 2029. However, due to Saudi Arabia initially planning to host the 2027 AFC Asian Cup at the same time as the Supercopa, the event would be moved to Istanbul, Turkey, marking the second time the tournament had been moved from Saudi Arabia following the 2021 edition, which moved back to Spain due to the COVID-19 pandemic.

== Qualification ==
The tournament will feature the winners and runners-up of the 2025–26 La Liga and 2025–26 Copa del Rey.

=== Qualified teams ===
The following four teams qualified for the tournament.

Team	Method of qualification	Appearance	Last appearance as	Previous performance		
Team	Method of qualification	Appearance	Last appearance as	Winner(s)	Runners-up	Semi-finalists
Barcelona	2025–26 La Liga Winners	31st	2026 Winners	16	12	2
Real Sociedad	2025–26 Copa del Rey Winners	3rd	2021 Semi-finalists	1	0	1
Atlético Madrid	2025–26 Copa del Rey Runners-up	11th	2026 Semi-finalists	2	5	3
Real Madrid	2025–26 La Liga Runners-up	23rd	2026 Runners-up	13	8	1

== Venues ==
All three matches will be held in Istanbul, Turkey.

Location of the host city of the 2027 Supercopa de España.	City	Stadiums		
Location of the host city of the 2027 Supercopa de España.	Istanbul	Şükrü Saracoğlu Stadium	Beşiktaş Stadium	Rams Park

== Matches ==
=== Bracket ===
Semi-finals
2 February 2027 – Istanbul
Barcelona
Atlético Madrid
3 February 2027 – Istanbul
Real Sociedad
Real Madrid

Final
6 February 2027 – Istanbul

=== Semi-finals ===
2 February 2027
22:00

Barcelona	v	Atlético Madrid

Şükrü Saracoğlu Stadium, Istanbul

3 February 2027
22:00

Real Sociedad	v	Real Madrid

Beşiktaş Stadium, Istanbul

=== Final ===
6 February 2027
22:00

Barcelona or Atlético Madrid	v	Real Sociedad or Real Madrid

Rams Park, Istanbul

== See also ==
- 2026–27 La Liga
- 2026–27 Copa del Rey
