= Tegueste =

- Municipality
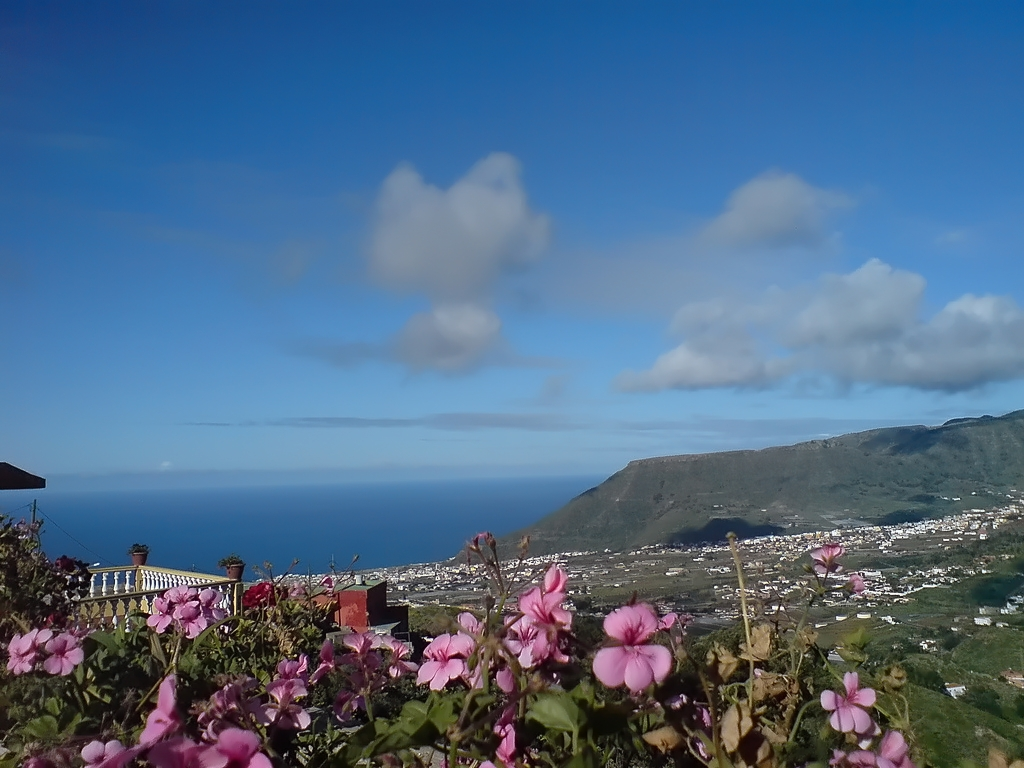

- Flag Coat of arms

- Municipal location in Tenerife

- Location in Province of Santa Cruz de Tenerife Tegueste (Canary Islands) Tegueste (Spain, Canary Islands)
- Coordinates: 28°31′N 16°20′W
- Country: Spain
- Autonomous Region: Canary Islands
- Province: Santa Cruz de Tenerife
- Island: Tenerife

Area
  - Total: 10.20 sq mi (26.41 km^{2})
- Elevation: 1,280 ft (390 m)

Population (2025-01-01)
  - Total: 11,490
  - Density: 1,127/sq mi (435.1/km^{2})
- Time zone: UTC+1 (GMT)
- Climate: Csb
- Website: www.tegueste.org

Tegueste is a town and a municipality of the northeastern part of the island of Tenerife in the Santa Cruz de Tenerife province, on the Canary Islands, Spain. It is surrounded by the municipality of San Cristóbal de La Laguna. The town Tegueste is located 4 km northwest of San Cristóbal de La Laguna and 11 km northwest of the island capital Santa Cruz de Tenerife. Tegueste became independent from San Cristóbal de La Laguna in the 17th century.

Currently, it is thought that the place name Tegueste is related to Thagaste, a city in Algeria where Saint Augustine of Hippo was born and a center of Berber culture.

== Historical population ==
| Year | Population |
|---|---|
| 1991 | 8,027 |
| 1996 | 8,558 |
| 2001 | 9,417 |
| 2002 | 9,816 |
| 2003 | 9,948 |
| 2004 | 10,165 |
| 2013 | 11,078 |

== See also ==
- List of municipalities in Santa Cruz de Tenerife
