= List of Olympic Football official match balls =

The following balls were used in the football tournament of the Summer Olympic Games.

Olympic Games	Official Match Ball	Manufacturer	Additional information
1952 Olympic Games	Super Olympia	Select Sport	
1956 Olympic Games	Super Olympia	Select Sport	
1960 Olympic Games	Super Olympia	Select Sport	
1964 Olympic Games	Super Olympia	Select Sport	
1968 Olympic Games	Adidas Telstar Elast	Adidas	Variant of Adidas Telstar
1972 Olympic Games	Adidas Telstar Durlast	Adidas	Variant of Adidas Telstar
1976 Olympic Games	Adidas Telstar Durlast	Adidas	Variant of Adidas Telstar
1980 Olympic Games	Adidas Tango Gol	Adidas	Variant of Adidas Tango
1984 Olympic Games	Adidas Tango Sevilla	Adidas	Variant of Adidas Tango
1988 Olympic Games	Adidas Tango Séoul	Adidas	Variant of Adidas Tango
1992 Olympic Games	Adidas Etrusco Unico	Adidas	
1996 Olympic Games	Adidas Questra Olympia	Adidas	Variant of Adidas Questra
2000 Olympic Games	Adidas Gamarada	Adidas	The aboriginal word for friendship, variation of the Adidas Terrestra Silverstream
2004 Olympic Games	Adidas Pelias	Adidas	
2008 Olympic Games	Adidas Teamgeist 2 Magnus Moenia	Adidas	Variation of the Adidas Teamgeist, with Magnus Moenia meaning 'walls of the great' in Latin
2012 Olympic Games	Adidas The Albert	Adidas	Variant of the Adidas Tango 12
2016 Olympic Games	Adidas Errejota	Adidas	Variant of the Adidas Beau Jeu
2020 Olympic Games	Adidas Conext 21	Adidas	The original ball was Adidas Tsubasa, variant of the Adidas Uniforia, but later replaced
2024 Olympic Games	Adidas Île-De-Foot 24	Adidas	Variant of the Adidas Fussballiebe

== See also ==
- List of FIFA World Cup official match balls
- List of UEFA European Championship official match balls
- List of Copa América official match balls
- List of CONCACAF Gold Cup official match balls
- List of Africa Cup of Nations official match balls
- List of AFC Asian Cup official match balls
