= Adidas Argentum =

Brand of association footballs

The Adidas Argentum is a family and brand of association football balls. Used as official match balls of Argentine football championship, the Argentum balls, in order to distinguish them in their construction, have had the year of adoption in their names.

Before the adoption of the brand, as official match balls of the Argentine football championships were used variants of Adidas Tango, of Adidas Roteiro, of Adidas Teamgeist and Terrapass, of Adidas SpeedCell and of Adidas Tango 12. However, the first real brand created for AFA was Adidas Tafugo.

== 2014–2017 ==
From 2014 to 2017 the line of Argentum balls adopted the technology developed with Adidas Brazuca. Adidas Argentum, used for 2014 Argentine Primera División, had the same template of Adidas Brazuca, but with a bluish coloration. A silver variant, Argentum Derby, was used in the Superclásicos of the same season. Adidas Argentum 2015, used for 2015 Argentine Primera División, showed a bluish and black template, with the same shape of Adidas Conext 15 balls. Adidas Argentum 2016, used for 2016 Argentine Primera División, showed again a bluish decoration, but it adopted the same template as the balls that replaced the line started with Brazuca, which was first used for Adidas Beau Jeu. Adidas Argentum 2017, used for 2016–17 Argentine Primera División and 2017–18 Argentine Superliga, adopted the same template as the balls that replaced the line of Adidas Conext 15, which was first used for Adidas Krasava.

== 2018–2021 ==
Between 2018 and 2021 the line of Argentum balls adopted the same technology of Adidas Telstar 18. Adidas presented as official match ball of 2018–19 Argentine Superliga Adidas Argentum 2018, that showed pinkish lozenges and a sun-inspired yellow drawing. For 2019–20 Argentine Superliga was used Adidas Argentum 2019, that was decorated with a bluish variant of Adidas Conext 19 pattern. Adidas Argentum 2021, the official match ball of 2021 Argentine Primera División, was decorated with a colorful variant of Adidas Uniforia and Adidas Tsubasa pattern. Another variant of the same pattern was used for the decoration of Adidas Argentum 2022, the official match ball of 2022 Argentine Primera División.

== Since 2022 ==
Since 2022 the balls adopted the SpeedShell technology developed for Adidas Al Rihla and its variants. The official match ball of 2022 Argentine Primera División was Adidas Argentum Gotán, that was decorated with a purple triadic pattern, that paid partially omage to Adidas Tango. Adidas announced as official match ball 2023 Argentine Primera División and 2024 Argentine Primera División Adidas Argentum 1893.
