= List of Africa Cup of Nations official match balls =

The following match balls were used in the Africa Cup of Nations over the years.

== List ==
Edition	Official match ball	Manufacturer	Notes
1992	Etrusco Unico	Adidas	Also official 1990 FIFA World Cup match ball
1994	Samba	Diadora	
1996	Ceramica	Umbro	
1998	Ceramica	Umbro	
2000	Ceramica	Umbro	
2002	Tricolore	Adidas	Also official 1998 FIFA World Cup match ball
2004	Fevernova	Adidas	Also official 2002 FIFA World Cup match ball
2006	Teamgeist	Adidas	Also official 2006 FIFA World Cup match ball
2008	Wawa Aba	Adidas	Ball named after Adinkra symbol meaning "seed of the wawa," referring to strength, toughness, endurance, durability
2010	Jabulani Angola	Adidas	Variation of Adidas Jabulani used at 2010 FIFA World Cup
2012	Comoequa	Adidas	Ball named after Lake Como, which flows through both countries and the Equator
2013	Katlego	Adidas	Ball named after Sotho word for "success"
2015	Marhaba	Adidas	Ball named after Arabic greeting
2017	Delta Hyperseam	Mitre	
2019	Neo Pro	Umbro	
2021	Toghu	Umbro	Ball named after Cameroon traditional Toghu clothing
2023	Pokou	Puma	Ball named after iconic Ivorian forward Laurent Pokou
2025	ITRI	Puma	Traditional Moroccan zellij geometric patterns incorporated

== See also ==
- List of FIFA World Cup official match balls
- List of UEFA European Championship official match balls
- List of Copa América official match balls
- List of CONCACAF Gold Cup official match balls
- List of AFC Asian Cup official match balls
- List of Olympic Football official match balls
