= Adidas Conext =

Brand of footballs

The Adidas Conext is a family and brand of association footballs. The Conext balls have had different numbers in their names (that recalls the year of first release) applied to them to distinguish them in their construction. The balls had been produced for various competitions including the FIFA Women's World Cup, the football competition of the Summer Olympic Games, the UEFA Super Cup, the FIFA Club World Cup, the FIFA Intercontinental Cup, and various club national competitions.

== Adidas Conext 15 ==
Adidas Conext 15
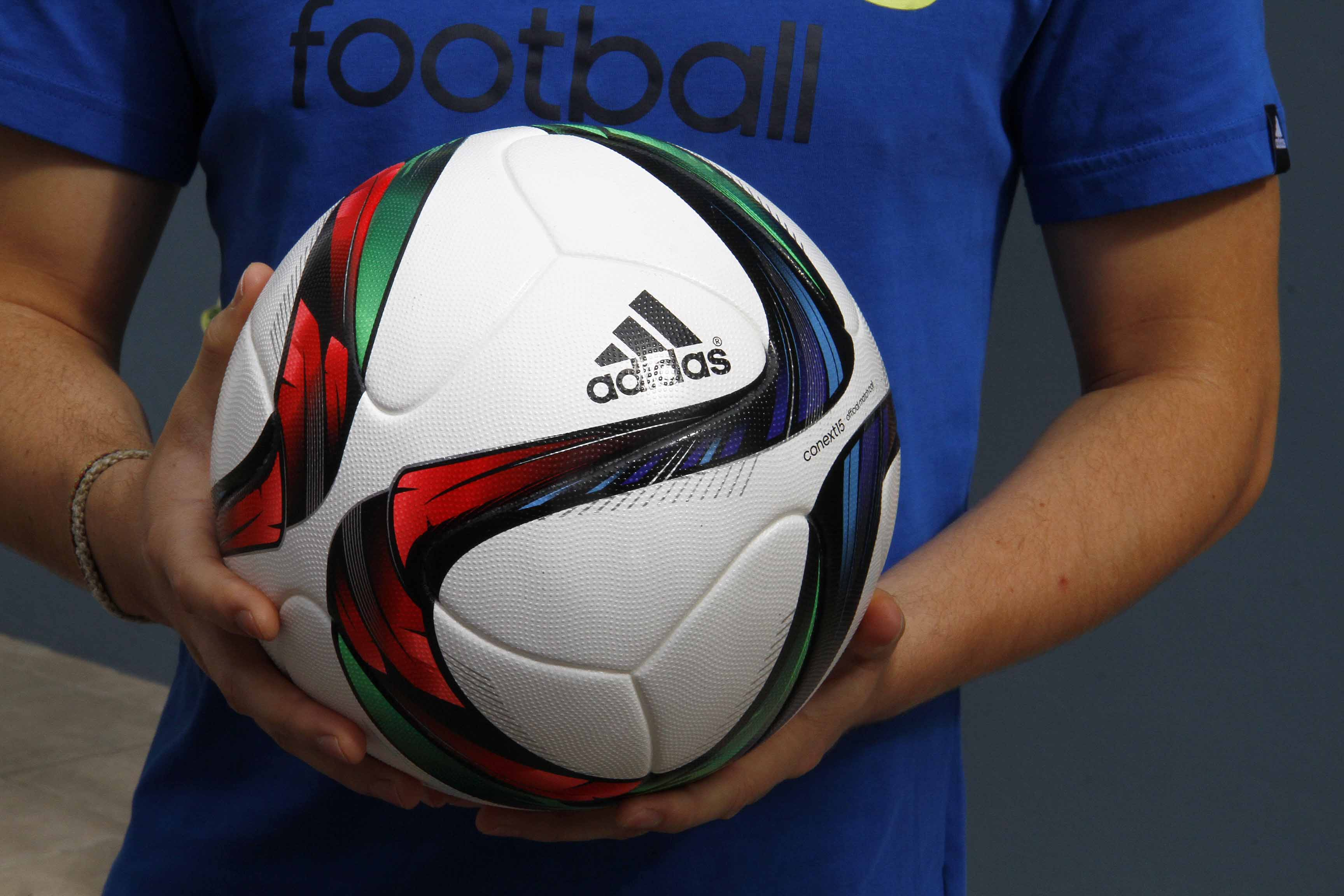
- Type: Association football
- Inventor: Adidas
- Inception: November 2014; 12 years ago
- Manufacturer: Adidas
- Available: No

The Adidas Conext 15 was based on the same technology introduced in the Adidas Brazuca. The ball was mostly white, decorated with a wavy 8-like shape, that recalls that one of Adidas Marhaba. A first version was presented in September 2014 as the official match ball of UEFA Euro 2016 qualifying, its pattern was black with red and silver details. A few months later, in late November 2014, the version used for 2014 FIFA Club World Cup was announced. This ball had slightly different colors in the decoration, because the black line presented red, green and blue elements inspired by nature. The same ball was also used for 2014–15 Copa del Rey, 2015 Supercopa de España and 2015 J1 League. The ball was used in the 2015 Africa Cup of Nations. Another variant was used as official match ball of 2015 UEFA Super Cup, that had a green and blue pattern on the wavy shape. Other two chromatic variants were used as official match balls for 2015–16 and 2016–17 UEFA Europa League.

The ball was used also for the 2015 FIFA Women's World Cup in Canada; while the final of the tournament was played with the variant called Adidas Conext 15 Final Vancouver, that was the first ball created specifically for a Women's World Cup final.

Since the 2017 the pattern of Adidas Conext 15 was replaced by the cross-shaped pattern already presented for Adidas Krasava, that was used for the official match balls of 2016 FIFA Club World Cup, 2017 J1 League, 2017 UEFA Super Cup, 2017–18 UEFA Europa League and 2018 FIFA World Cup qualification.

== Adidas Conext 19 ==
Adidas Conext 19
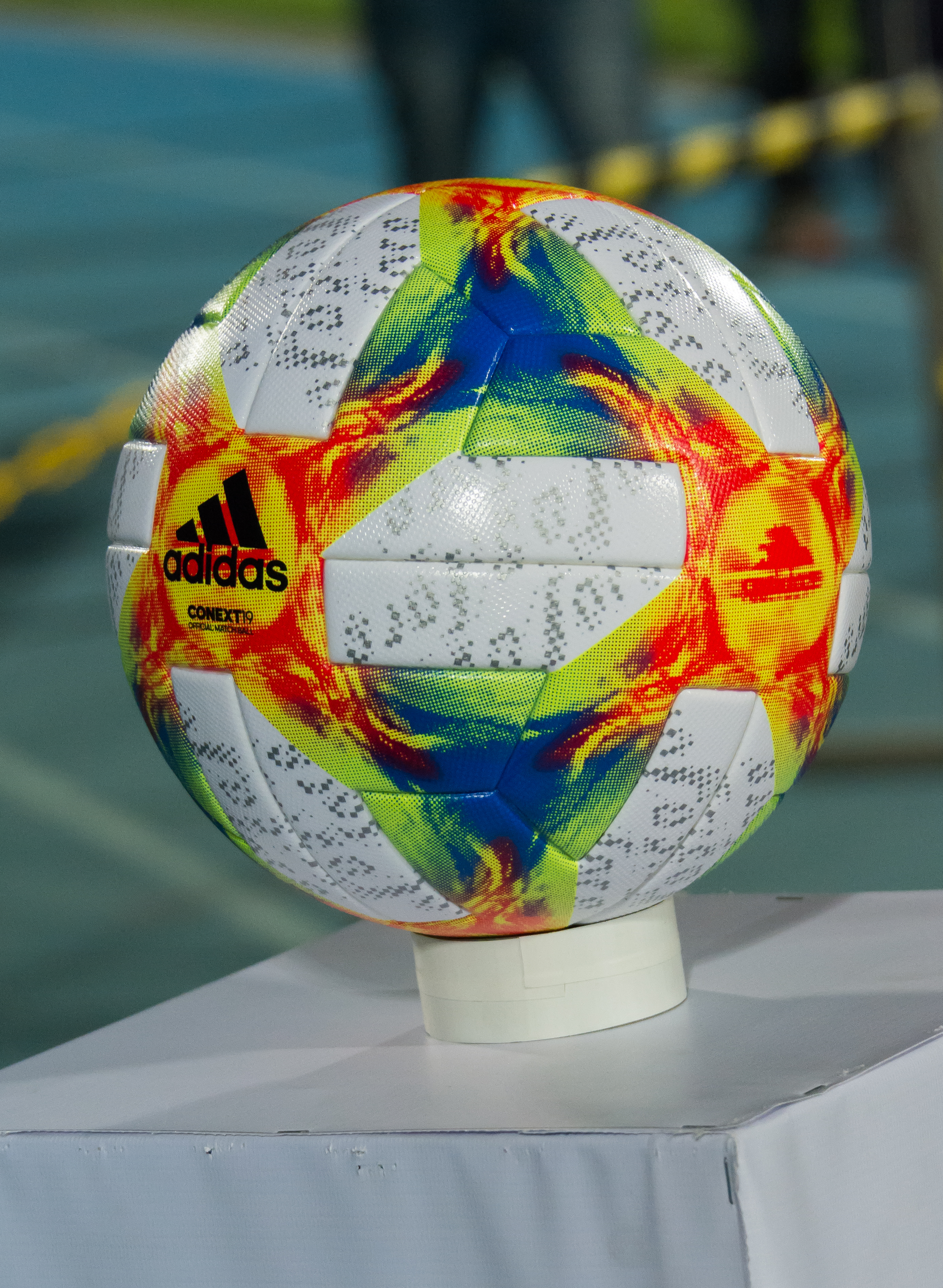
- Type: Association football
- Inventor: Adidas
- Inception: February 2019; 7 years ago
- Manufacturer: Adidas
- Available: No

The Adidas Conext 19, that was based on the same seamless, mono-panel design as the Adidas Telstar 18, was officially announced as the official match ball of 2019 FIFA Women's World Cup in France. The ball was mainly white with a triangular shaped pattern, made by glitched graphic in blue, red, yellow and green. Adidas produced also a winter version of the ball, painted in orange with a dark blue decoration. Adidas Conext 19 was used also for 2018–19 3. Liga, while a red variant was produced for 2019 J1 League. A green and blue variant was used as official match ball of 2019 UEFA Super Cup.

The ball was used also for UEFA Euro 2020 qualifying and for 36 matches in the group stage of 2019 FIFA Women's World Cup; while for the knock-out phase a match ball designed on purpose for the competition was used: Adidas Tricolore 19, which is inspired by the Tricolore ball that was used in the 1998 FIFA World Cup.

== Adidas Conext 21 ==
Adidas Conext 21
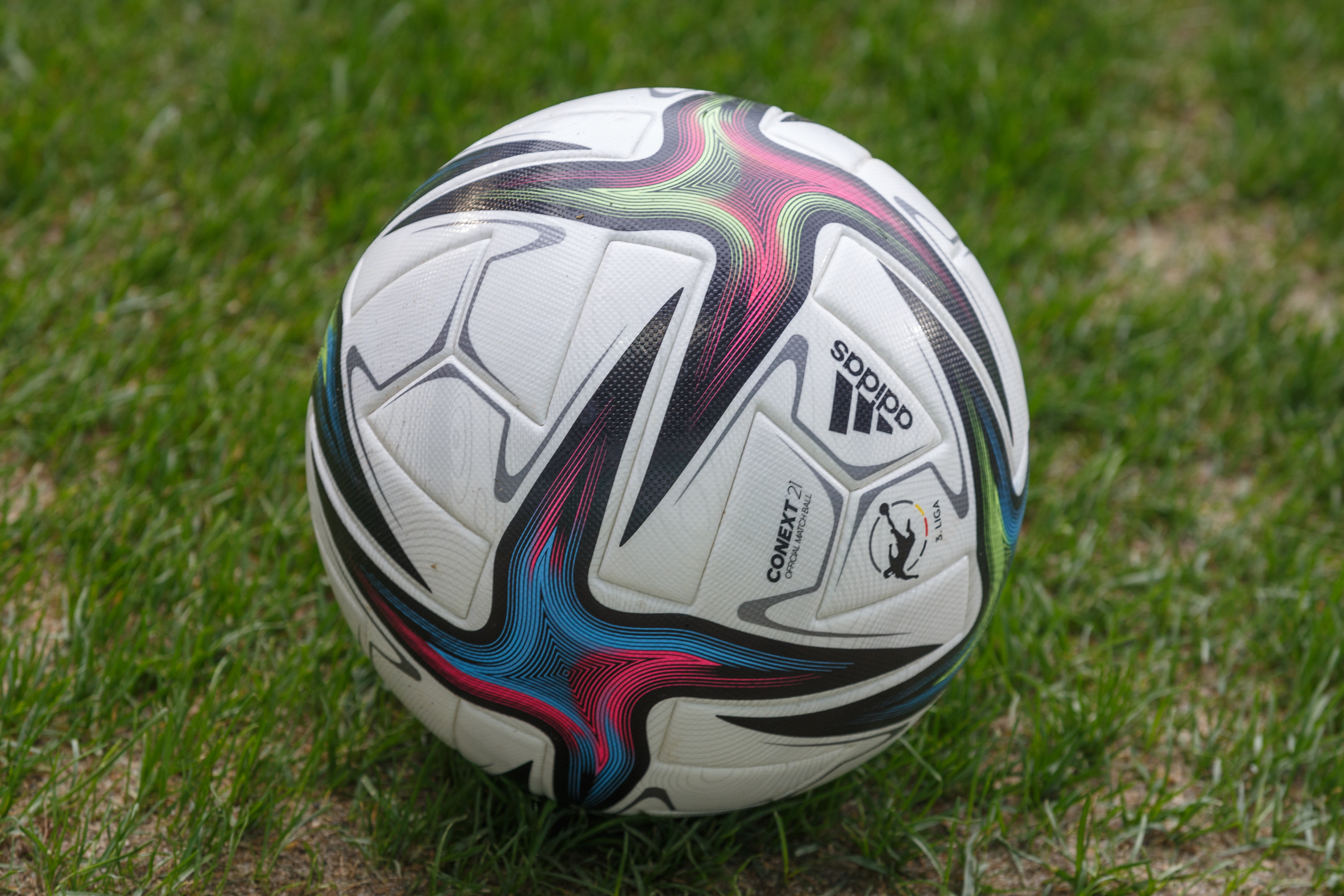
- Type: Association football
- Inventor: Adidas
- Inception: December 2020; 5 years ago
- Manufacturer: Adidas
- Available: No

The Adidas Conext 21 was announced in December 2020 as the official match ball of 2020 FIFA Club World Cup in Qatar, based on the same technology introduced in the Adidas Telstar 18 and Adidas Conext 19. The design was formed by six black four-legged star-like shapes, with blue, green and magenta details. Adidas Conext 21 was used also for 2020–21 3. Liga and 2021 J1 League. A variant with a red and yellow details was used as the official match ball for 2020–21 Copa del Rey and 2020 Supercopa de España. A green and blue variant was used as the official match ball of 2021 UEFA Super Cup.

Originally Adidas presented the Adidas Tsubasa as the ad hoc designed official match ball of 2020 Summer Olympics, already used for 2019 FIFA Club World Cup, 2020 J1 League and 2020 UEFA Super Cup, but due to the COVID-19 pandemic the Olympic games were postponed to summer 2021. In July 2021 the replacement of Adidas Tsubasa with a variant of Conext 21 was announced, with a red decoration, as the official match ball of the Olympic tournaments.

== Adidas Conext 24 Pro ==
Adidas Conext 24 Pro
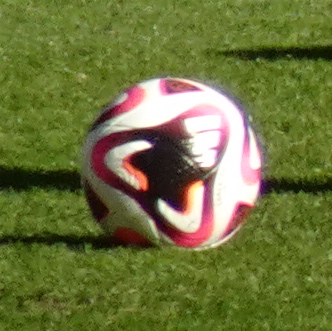
- Type: Association football
- Inventor: Adidas
- Inception: December 2023; 2 years ago
- Manufacturer: Adidas
- Available: No

The Adidas Conext 24 Pro was announced in December 2023 as the official match ball of 2023 FIFA Club World Cup in Saudi Arabia. The technology was the same introduced with Adidas Al Rihla and Adidas Fussballliebe and its main color was black, with pink shades and orange details, while the decoration recalls that of Adidas Oceaunz, but with the pattern colored white. A white variant, with a red pattern and black details, called Adidas Kotohogi 30 was announced as the official match ball of 2023 J1 League, in order to celebrate the 30th anniversary of J.League, while another variant with a blue-green pattern was used for 2023 UEFA Super Cup. A variant has been announced also as the official match ball for 2024 DFB-Pokal final, the 2024 UEFA Super Cup and the 2024–25 Qatar Stars League.

== Adidas Conext 25 ==
Adidas Conext 25
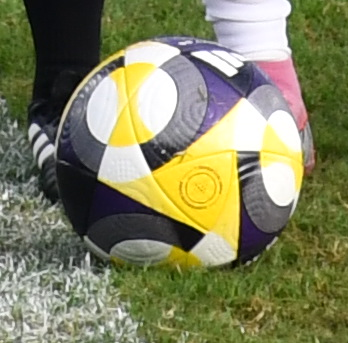
- Type: Association football
- Inventor: Adidas
- Inception: December 2024; 23 months ago
- Manufacturer: Adidas
- Available: Yes

The Adidas Conext 25 was announced in December 2024 as the official match ball of 2024 FIFA Intercontinental Cup in Qatar, based on the same technology introduced with Adidas Fussballliebe and Adidas Conext 24 Pro. The ball was mainly white, with white, purple and black details in a yellow pattern, while the decoration recalls that one of Adidas Île-De-Foot 24 and 2024–25 Saudi Pro League official match ball. Adidas Conext 25 was used also for 2025 Peru Liga 1, 2025–26 Qatar Stars League and 2025 J1 League. A variant with red pattern and white, silver and black details was used for 2025 J.League Cup. There are two more colorful versions of the Conext 25, for 2025 FIFA Beach Soccer World Cup, with black pattern and red, purple and violet details, and for 2025 FIFA Club World Cup, based on the U.S. flag.

== Adidas Conext 26 ==
Adidas Conext 26
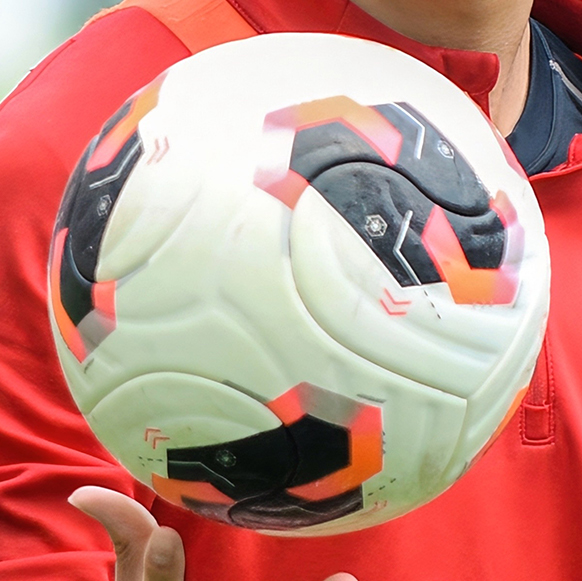
- Type: Association football
- Inventor: Adidas
- Inception: December 2025; 11 months ago
- Manufacturer: Adidas
- Available: Yes

The Adidas Conext 26 was announced in December 2025 as the official match ball of 2025 FIFA Intercontinental Cup in Qatar, based on the same technology introduced in the Adidas Trionda. Its design was mainly white, with a black pattern in a pink, orange and gray color scheme. It was also used for 2026 K League 1, 2026 Peru Liga 1 and 2026–27 Qatar Stars League, with blue variants used for 2026–27 J1 League, 2026 UEFA Super Cup and 2026–27 Ekstraklasa. A red variant, renamed as Adidas Torfabrik was released on June 1, 2026 as the official match ball for 2026–27 Bundesliga.
