= List of FIFA World Cup official match balls =

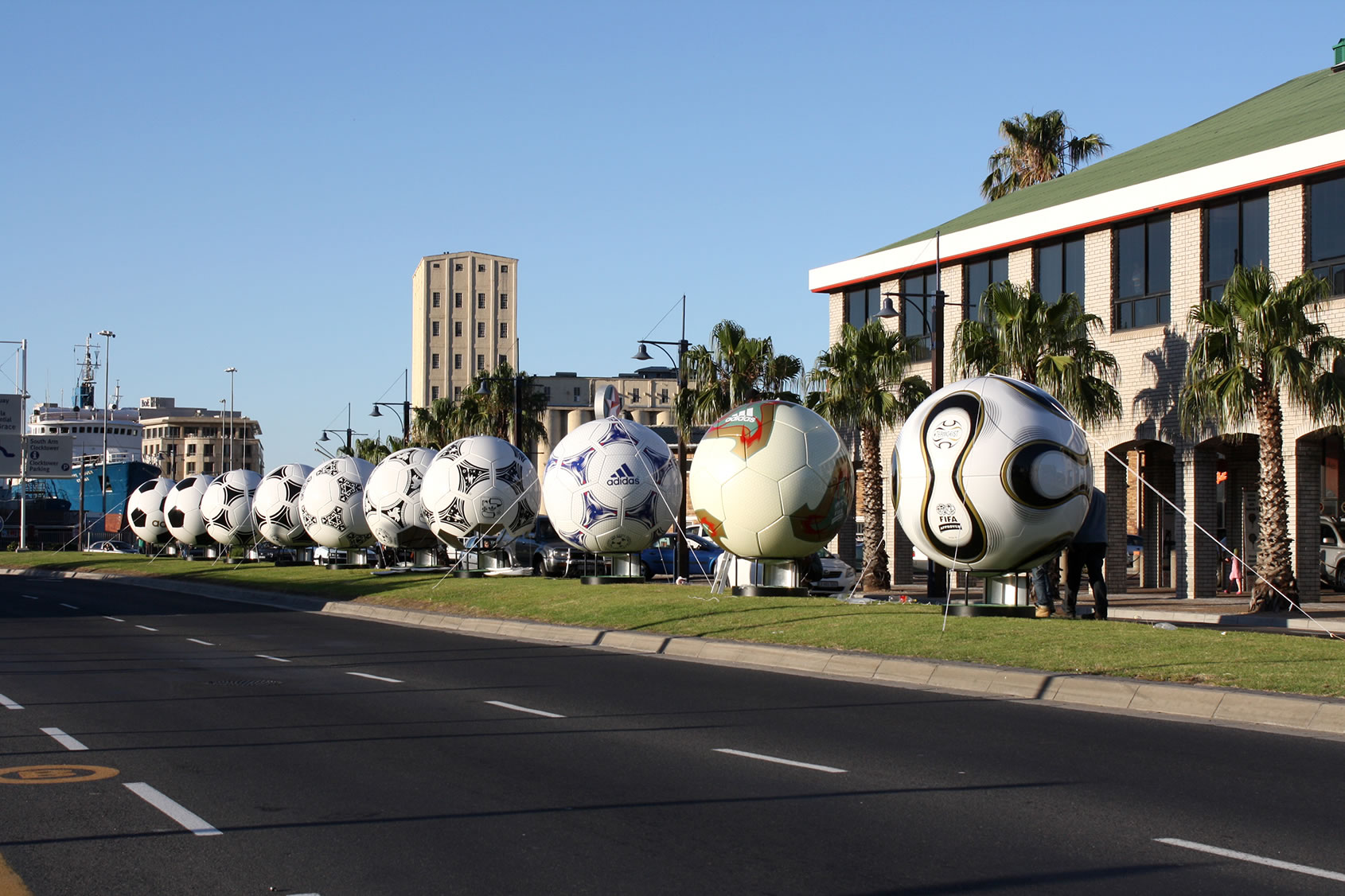
Large inflatable replicas of Adidas World Cup balls in Cape Town, 2009: from left to right, Telstar (1970), Telstar Durlast (1974), Tango (1978), Tango España (1982), Azteca (1986), Etrusco Unico (1990), Questra (1994), Tricolore (1998), Fevernova (2002), Teamgeist (2006).

This is a list of the official match balls for the FIFA World Cup finals tournaments.

From the 1970 FIFA World Cup, different official match balls have been used by FIFA.

== List ==
Edition	Match ball		Manufacturer	Panels	Additional information	Ref.
1930	Tiento (1st half) T-Model (2nd half)		—		Two different balls were used in the final: Argentina supplied the first-half ball (the 'Tiento') and led 2–1 at the break; hosts Uruguay supplied the second-half ball (the 'T-Model' which was larger and heavier) and won 4–2.	
1934	Federale 102		ECAS (Ente Centrale Approvvigionamento Sportivi), Rome			
1938	Allen		Allen, Paris	13	Made up of leather, It had white cotton laces on a separate, thin panel.	
1950	Duplo T		Superball	12	First ball to have no laces and introduce the syringe valve.	
1954	Swiss World Champion		Kost Sport, Basel	18	The first 18-panel ball.	
1958	Top Star		Sydsvenska Läder och Remfabriken, Ängelholm (aka "Remmen" or "Sydläder")		Chosen from 102 candidates in a blind test by four FIFA officials.	
1962	Crack		Señor Custodio Zamora H., San Miguel, Chile Remmen	18	The Crack was the official ball. Referee Ken Aston was unimpressed with the Chilean ball provided for the opening match, and sent for a European ball, which arrived in the second half. Various matches used different balls, with the apparent rumour the European teams did not trust the locally produced ball.	
1966	Challenge 4-Star		Slazenger	25	In orange or yellow. Selected in a blind test at the Football Association headquarters in Soho Square.	
1970	Telstar		Adidas	32 (20 hexagons and 12 pentagons)	Telstar was the first 32-panel black-and-white ball used in the FIFA World Cup finals. Only 20 were supplied by Adidas. A brown ball (Germany–Peru) and a white ball (first half of Italy–Germany) were used in some matches.	
1974	Telstar Durlast		Adidas	32 (20 hexagons and 12 pentagons)	The first polyurethane coated ball, making it waterproof and resistant to wear and tear.	
1978	Tango		Adidas	32 (20 hexagons and 12 pentagons)	The first of a family of footballs that was also used in the UEFA European Championships and the Summer Olympics until 1988.	
1982	Tango España		Adidas	32 (20 hexagons and 12 pentagons)	Similar to its predecessor, the Tango, the Tango España had a polyurethane coating. It had new and improved rubberized seams and was the last leather ball to be used in the World Cup.	
1986	Azteca		Adidas	32 (20 hexagons and 12 pentagons)	First fully synthetic FIFA World Cup ball and first hand-sewed ball. The decoration consisted of triangles inspired by Aztec art, making it the first ball to have clear references to the host country in its design. The name comes from the pre-Columbian civilization that existed in Mexico when the Spanish arrived in the 16th century.	
1990	Etrusco Unico		Adidas	32 (20 hexagons and 12 pentagons)	The design was also inspired by the 1978 Tango ball, but its distinguishing feature was the complex decorative design, which drew inspiration from Etruscan art: three Etruscan lions decorating the twenty typical triangles of the Tango ball.	
1994	Questra		Adidas	32 (20 hexagons and 12 pentagons)	The name derives from an Old English phrase meaning "the quest for the stars," with stars being present on the United States flag.	
1998	Tricolore		Adidas	32 (20 hexagons and 12 pentagons)	First multi-coloured ball at a World Cup finals tournament. Its design is similar to that of its predecessor, the Questra, but features the colors of the French flag (also known as the *Tricolore*): blue, white, and red. Additionally, the triangles featured stylized depictions of roosters—another French symbol.	
1999 (women)	Icon		Adidas	32 (20 hexagons and 12 pentagons)	First ball specifically created for a Women's World Cup. Technically identical to the Tricolore, but with a different visual design.	
2002	Fevernova		Adidas	32 (20 hexagons and 12 pentagons)	First World Cup ball with a triangular design. It was the first World Cup ball to break the pattern of concentric circles used over the previous two decades, featuring a design consisting of gray triangles bordered in gold, each topped with a curved red flame motif. This shape resembles a shuriken, yet it retains the underlying truncated icosahedron structure. The ball for the 2003 Women's World Cup was technically identical to the Fevernova, but had a different visual design.	
2006	Teamgeist		Adidas	14	Each match at the World Cup finals had its own individual ball, printed with the date of the match, the stadium and the team names. A special variant, the gold-coloured Teamgeist Berlin, was used in the final match. As in 2003, the ball used for the 2007 Women's World Cup was identical in performance to the ball used in the previous year's World Cup, but with a different visual design.	
2006	Teamgeist Berlin		Adidas	14	Each match at the World Cup finals had its own individual ball, printed with the date of the match, the stadium and the team names. A special variant, the gold-coloured Teamgeist Berlin, was used in the final match. As in 2003, the ball used for the 2007 Women's World Cup was identical in performance to the ball used in the previous year's World Cup, but with a different visual design.	
2010	Jabulani		Adidas	8	A special variant was used for the final match, the gold Jabulani (picture on the left), which was named after "Jo'burg", a standard South African nickname for Johannesburg, site of the final game. The ball was notable for the controversy it attracted, with players and fans contending that its aerodynamics were unusually unpredictable.	
2010	Jo'bulani		Adidas	8	A special variant was used for the final match, the gold Jabulani (picture on the left), which was named after "Jo'burg", a standard South African nickname for Johannesburg, site of the final game. The ball was notable for the controversy it attracted, with players and fans contending that its aerodynamics were unusually unpredictable.	
2011 (women)	SpeedCell		Adidas	8	Technically identical to the Jabulani, but with a different visual design.	
2014	Brazuca		Adidas	6	This is the first FIFA World Cup ball named by the fans. The ball has been made of six polyurethane panels which have been thermally bonded. For the final game, a different colour scheme was used, featuring green, gold and black.	
2014	Brazuca Final Rio		Adidas	6	This is the first FIFA World Cup ball named by the fans. The ball has been made of six polyurethane panels which have been thermally bonded. For the final game, a different colour scheme was used, featuring green, gold and black.	
2015 (women)	Conext 15		Adidas	6	Based on the technology introduced in the Brazuca. The Conext15 Final Vancouver is the first ball created specifically for a Women's World Cup final.	
2015 (women)	Conext 15 Final Vancouver		Adidas	6	Based on the technology introduced in the Brazuca. The Conext15 Final Vancouver is the first ball created specifically for a Women's World Cup final.	
2018	Telstar 18		Adidas	6	For the 48 matches in the Group stage, teams competed with a ball designed in tribute to the original Adidas Telstar, used in the 1970 and 1974 World Cups.	
2018	Telstar Mechta		Adidas	6	At the end of the 2018 World Cup group stage, FIFA revealed a new color scheme to be used for the 16 matches played in the knockout stage: the Telstar Mechta (Мечта). Mechta means 'dream' or 'ambition' in Russian.	
2019 (women)	Conext 19		Adidas	6	Used for 36 matches in the group stage. It shares the same seamless, mono-panel design as the Telstar 18, but with a glitched graphic that's inspired by the Tricolore ball that was used in the 1998 FIFA World Cup.	
2019 (women)	Tricolore 19		Adidas	6	Inspired by the Tricolore ball and based on the same template as the Conext 19, the Tricolore 19 ball features a mono-panel aesthetic with a blue-and-red glitch graphic. This ball was used in the knockout stage.	
2022	Al Rihla	Al-Rihla, the Official Matchball for the 2022 FIFA World Cup	Adidas	20	The ball was designed with sustainability as a priority, making it the first ever official match ball created with water-based glues and inks. The name of the ball, Al Rihla, means 'the journey' or 'the excursion' in Arabic. Two Al Rihla match balls went on a suborbital mission onboard SpaceX's Falcon 9's first stage booster before being used in the World Cup on 15 October 2022. For the final four matches, a different color scheme was used featuring burgundy and gold—the colors of Qatar and the World Cup. Its name Al Hilm means 'the dream' in Arabic.	
2022	Al Hilm		Adidas	20		
2023 (women)	Oceaunz		Adidas	20	The official match ball used during the early stages of the FIFA Women's World Cup, this ball stands out with graphics that reflect the importance of Australia and New Zealand's spectacular coastlines and life-sustaining lakes and waterways. Oceaunz features the same connected ball technology as was seen in Qatar at the 2022 FIFA World Cup. This provides precise ball data, which will be made available to video match officials in real-time. For the final four matches, a different color scheme is used featuring orange and gold, reflecting the sunsets across the Sydney skyline, where the final was held.	
2023 (women)	Oceaunz Final Pro		Adidas	20		
2026	Trionda		Adidas	4	Trionda is from the combination of the words "Tri" in English, which means "three", referring to the number of countries hosting the tournament, and the word "Onda", which is used in Spanish and Portuguese in a similar sense and meaning wave, is created from the combination of these two words "Trionda" which means "triple wave". The green represents Mexico with its eagle symbol, the red represents Canada with its maple leaf symbol, and the blue represents the US with its stars symbol. For the final four matches, a new dedicated design was used featuring gold, white and black. The Trionda Final ball also features the names of four host cities that hosted the semi-finals, third place match and the final.	
2026	Trionda Final		Adidas	4		

== See also ==
- List of UEFA European Championship official match balls
- List of Copa América official match balls
- List of CONCACAF Gold Cup official match balls
- List of Africa Cup of Nations official match balls
- List of AFC Asian Cup official match balls
- List of Olympic Football official match balls
