= Adidas Questra =

Footballs used for major international events in the mid-1990s

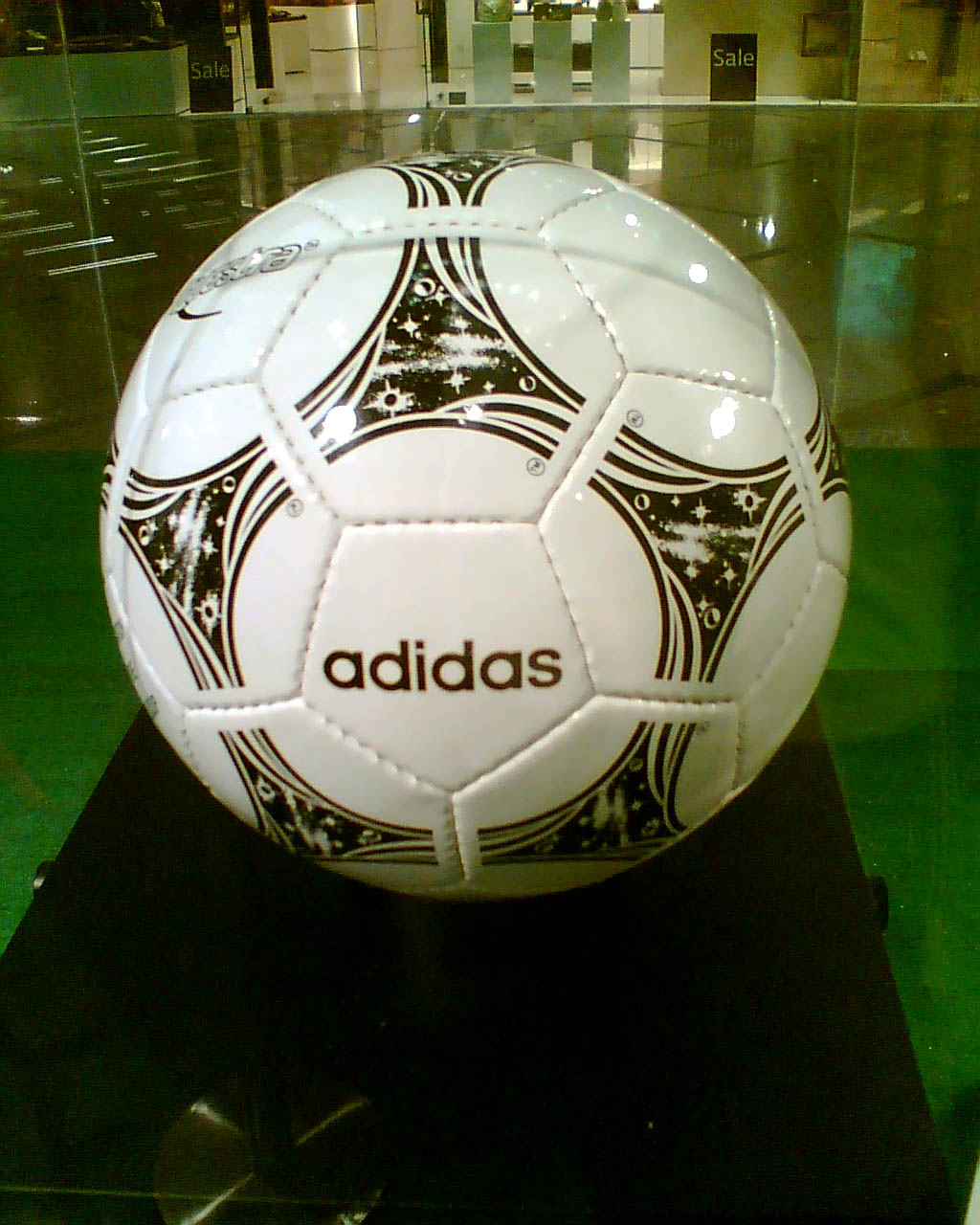
- Type: Football
- Inception: 1994; 32 years ago
- Manufacturer: Adidas

Questra is the name given to a family of footballs originally produced by Adidas for major international events in the mid-1990s. Named after "the quest for the stars," successive versions of the ball were produced for the 1996 Olympic tournament and Euro 1996. The Questra was also the official ball of Spanish La Liga.

== History ==
The first ball of the family was simply named the Questra and was originally designed to be the official match ball of the 1994 FIFA World Cup in the United States. Following the convention of the addition of decorations to the established Adidas Tango style since the Azteca and the Etrusco Unico, this one featured space-themed decorations, not only due to its name, but that 1994 marked the 25th anniversary of the Apollo 11 mission in which the first Moon landing took place, which is considered to be one of the most important moments in the history of the host country and the world.

Due to the popularity of that ball, there were two new editions of the Questra released in 1996. One of them was named the "Questra Europa" and was intended to be the official match ball of UEFA Euro 1996 in England, while the other one was bearing the name "Questra Olympia" and was the official match ball of the football tournament at the 1996 Summer Olympics. Both of these balls reported colours.

In the development process of the Questra, Adidas tried to create a lighter and more responsive ball. By manufacturing the new ball from five different materials and enveloping it in polystyrene foam, Adidas made the Questra more waterproof and allowed for greater acceleration when kicked. Consequently, the ball became softer to touch and ball control was improved. This showed within a week of the World Cup in 1994, as players quickly adapted to the new ball and were able to score great goals by utilizing the lighter ball. However, some goalkeepers complained of the ball's unpredictability in humid weather, which made saving shots on goal particularly difficult.

The last edition of the Questra was the "Questra Apollo", which was used in La Liga matches and by the Spanish national team in the 1996–97 season. The Questra Apollo was identical to the original Questra from the 1994 World Cup, except for bearing the logo of the Royal Spanish Football Federation.

The ball was used in the Intercontinental Cup from the 1994 to 1997 editions.

Preceded by Etrusco Unico	FIFA World Cup official ball 1994	Succeeded by Tricolore
Preceded by Etrusco Unico	UEFA European Championship official ball 1996	Succeeded by Terrestra Silverstream
