= List of CONCACAF Gold Cup official match balls =

The following match balls were used in the CONCACAF Gold Cup over the years.

== List ==
Edition	Official match ball	Manufacturer	Notes
2011	Total 90 Tracer	Nike	Variant decorated with the colors of the competition's logo and the logo itself
2013	Incyte	Nike	Variant decorated with the colors of the competition's logo and the logo itself
2015	Ordem 3	Nike	Variant of Nike Ordem; variant decorated with the colors of the competition's logo and the logo itself
2017	Ordem 4	Nike	Variant of Nike Ordem; variant decorated with the colors of the competition's logo and the logo itself
2019	Merlin 2	Nike	Variant of Nike Merlin; variant decorated with the colors of the competition's logo and the logo itself
2021	Flight	Nike	Variant decorated with the colors of the competition's logo and the logo itself
2023	Flight 3	Nike	Variant of Nike Flight; variant decorated with the colors of the competition's logo and the logo itself
2025	Gold Vantaggio 5000	Molten	Variant of Vantaggio 5000; variant decorated with the colors of the competition and the Confederation's logo.

== See also ==
- List of FIFA World Cup official match balls
- List of UEFA European Championship official match balls
- List of Africa Cup of Nations official match balls
- List of Copa América official match balls
- List of AFC Asian Cup official match balls
- List of Olympic Football official match balls
