= List of UEFA European Championship official match balls =

The following match balls were used in the UEFA European Championship over the years.

== List ==
Edition	Official match ball	Manufacturer	Additional information
1968	Telstar Elast	Adidas	First championship use of this ball
1972	Telstar Durlast	Adidas	Variations of the original Telstar
1976	Telstar Durlast	Adidas	Variations of the original Telstar
1980	Tango Italia	Adidas	Variations of the original Tango
1984	Tango Mundial	Adidas	Variations of the original Tango
1988	Tango Europa	Adidas	Variations of the original Tango
1992	Etrusco Unico	Adidas	Same ball used in the 1990 FIFA World Cup
1996	Questra Europa	Adidas	Design variant of the Questra
2000	Terrestra Silverstream	Adidas	
2004	Roteiro	Adidas	
2008	Europass	Adidas	
2008	Europass Gloria	Adidas	
2012	Tango 12	Adidas	
2012	Tango 12 Final Kyiv	Adidas	
2016	Beau Jeu	Adidas	Elements of the Adidas Brazuca in a new design
2016	Fracas	Adidas	Elements of the Adidas Brazuca in a new design
2020	Uniforia	Adidas	Elements of the Adidas Telstar 18 in a new design
2020	Uniforia Finale	Adidas	Elements of the Adidas Telstar 18 in a new design
2024	Fussballliebe	Adidas	Elements of the Adidas Al Rihla in a new design

== See also ==
- List of FIFA World Cup official match balls
- List of Copa América official match balls
- List of Africa Cup of Nations official match balls
- List of AFC Asian Cup official match balls
- List of Olympic Football official match balls
