= List of Copa América official match balls =

The following match balls were used in the Copa América over the years.

== List ==
Edition	Official match ball	Manufacturer	Notes
1991	Etrusco Unico	Adidas	Also the official 1990 FIFA World Cup match ball
1993	America's	Penalty	
1995	America's	Penalty	
1997	America's	Penalty	
1999	America's	Penalty	
2001	Star	Penalty	
2004	Total 90 Aerow CSW	Nike	Variant of Nike Total 90 Aerow
2007	Mercurial Veloci	Nike	Variant of Nike Mercurial Veloci
2011	Total 90 Tracer Doma	Nike	Variant of Nike Total 90 Tracer
2015	Cachaña	Nike	Variant of Nike Ordem. The name is a colloquial term for "dribbling" Chilean street football.
2016	Ordem Ciento	Nike	Variant of Nike Ordem. The name 'Ciento' is a reference to the Copa América Centenario. For the finale was used the variant Nike Ordem Campeon.
2019	Rabisco	Nike	Variant of Nike Merlin. The name Rabisco is after the Brazilian Portuguese 'rabisqueiro', a term that means "great skill".
2021	Flight	Nike	Was presented as official match ball and variant of Nike Merlin before tournament rescheduling due to COVID-19 pandemic. Part of the Nike Flight brand, its decoration was inspired by the hosts, Argentina and Colombia.
2024	Cumbre	Puma	Variant of Puma Orbita. The name 'Cumbre' means "to summit".

== See also ==
- List of FIFA World Cup official match balls
- List of UEFA European Championship official match balls
- List of Africa Cup of Nations official match balls
- List of CONCACAF Gold Cup official match balls
- List of AFC Asian Cup official match balls
- List of Olympic Football official match balls
