= Slazenger Challenge 4-Star =

Official match ball for the 1966 FIFA World Cup

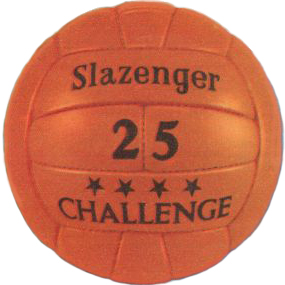
The Slazenger Challenge 4-Star

Challenge 4-Star was a football made by the British company Slazenger as the official match ball for the 1966 FIFA World Cup held in England, one of the countries inside the United Kingdom. The ball was made with 25 rectangular panels and had no markings or branding. It was selected in a blind test at the Football Association headquarters in Soho Square.

Preceded by Crack	FIFA World Cup official ball 1966	Succeeded by Telstar
