= Adidas Fevernova =

Official match ball of 2002 FIFA World Cup

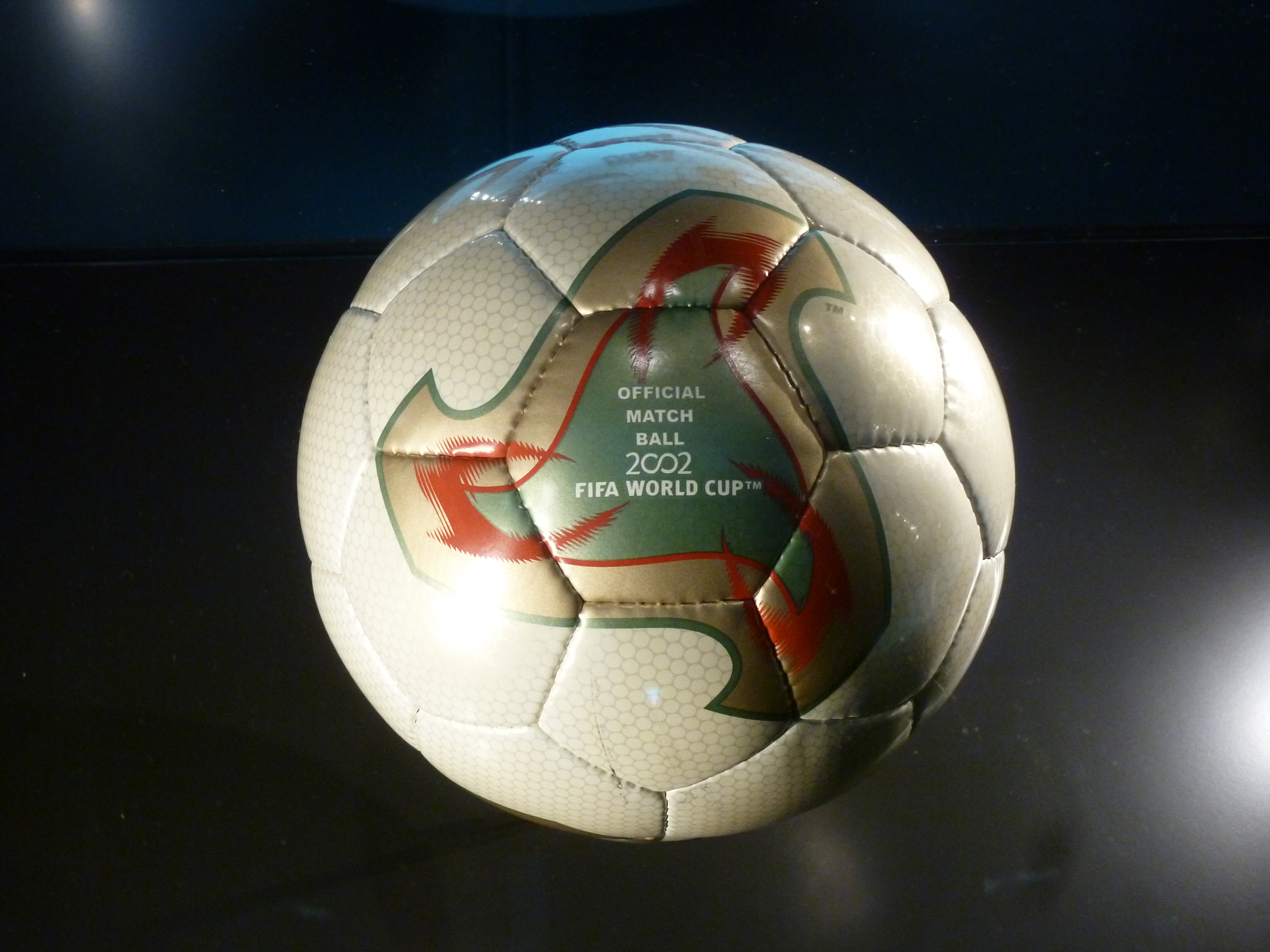
- Adidas Fevernova at the Deutsches Fußball Museum
- Type: Association football
- Inventor: Adidas
- Inception: 2002; 24 years ago
- Manufacturer: Adidas

The Adidas Fevernova is a football manufactured by German corporation Adidas. It was the official match ball of the 2002 FIFA World Cup held in South Korea and Japan and 2003 FIFA Women's World Cup held in United States. Its styling marked a departure from the traditional Tango ball design.

The ball was composed of 11 layers and was 3-mm thick, including a special foam layer with gas filled balloon imbedded in a syntactic foam. The outer cover was made from a combination of polyurethane and rubber.

== History ==
The Fevernova's colouring parted from the Tango's style of three-pointed shapes connecting each hexagon, instead introducing a different, triangle-like shape on four hexagons. This colourful and revolutionary look and colour usage was entirely based on Asian culture (the dark gold trigon resembles a tomoe and the red streaks on its angles resemble calligraphy brush strokes). It also featured a refined syntactic foam layer, to give the ball superior performance characteristics, and a three-layer knitted chassis, allowing for a more precise and predictable flight path.

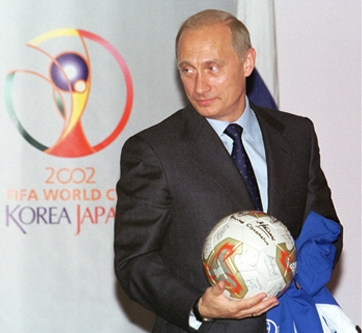
Vladimir Putin with Fevernova ball

This ball was notoriously criticised for being too light, yet some spectacular goals were scored with it during the tournament. The ball was also blamed for a number of upsets that happened in the knockout stages. Designers defended the ball, saying it was actually heavier than the typical ball, and that it was designed to allow players shoot with greater accuracy. Under FIFA rules, footballs have to have a circumference of 68–70 cm (27–28 in) and a mass of 410–450 g (14–16 oz); the Fevernova was at the lower range for circumference and near to the maximum allowed weight.

The ball was used in home matches during the 2002–03 Bundesliga for Bayer 04 Leverkusen, Bayern Munich, Hansa Rostock, 1. FC Nürnberg and Schalke 04 and was further used during the 2003–04 Bundesliga by Leverkusen, SC Freiburg, Bayern Munich, Hansa Rostock and Schalke.

The ball was used in the J.League during the 2002 and 2003 seasons.

The ball was also used in the 2003 FIFA Confederations Cup.

A new version of the ball was manufactured for the 2003 FIFA Women's World Cup.

It was also used in the 2004 Summer Paralympics and the 2004 African Cup of Nations.

== See also ==
- List of FIFA World Cup official match balls

Preceded by Tricolore	FIFA World Cup official ball 2002	Succeeded by Teamgeist
