= List of AFC Asian Cup official match balls =

In the AFC Asian Cup, prior to 2004, various match balls were used for the tournament, and therefore it was difficult to determine what was considered the official ball of the Asian Cup. It was only after the start of the new millennia when the Asian Football Confederation (AFC) began to declare one official match ball. The following match balls were used in the AFC Asian Cup over the years.

== List ==
Edition	Official match ball	Manufacturer	Additional information	Refs
2004	Roteiro	Adidas	First Asian Cup to register an official ball for the tournament. Also official UEFA Euro 2004 ball.	
2007	Mercurial Veloci	Nike	First independent official Asian Cup ball not brought from UEFA European Championship or FIFA World Cup	
2011	Total 90 Tracer	Nike		
2015	Ordem 2	Nike		
2019	Acentec	Molten	First official Asian Cup ball not manufactured by Adidas or Nike	
2023	VORTEXAC23; VORTEXAC23+	Kelme	After VORTEXAC23 was unveiled, VORTEXAC23+ was announced as official match ball for the final	
2027	KHUZAMA	Kelme		

== See also ==
- List of FIFA World Cup official match balls
- List of UEFA European Championship official match balls
- List of CONCACAF Gold Cup official match balls
- List of Copa América official match balls
- List of Africa Cup of Nations official match balls
- List of Olympic Football official match balls
