= Crack (ball) =

Official match ball for 1962 FIFA World Cup

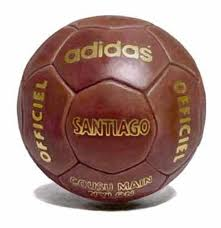
Crack, the 1962 ball

Crack was a football made by Curtiembres Salvador Caussade as the official match ball for the 1962 FIFA World Cup held in Chile.

== Ball ==
The Crack was made with eighteen panels, twelve hexagonal and six rectangular, and was the last FIFA World Cup ball to not be manufactured by a multinational. Before the 1962 FIFA World Cup, it was used for four years in the Chilean league, and was the first ever World Cup ball to have a regular spherical shape.

The Crack was the official ball for the 1962 FIFA World Cup. Referee Ken Aston was unimpressed with it for the opening match, and sent for a European ball, which arrived in the second half. Various matches used different balls, with the rumor European teams didn't trust the locally produced ball.

Preceded by Top Star	FIFA World Cup official ball 1962	Succeeded by Challenge 4-Star
