= Adidas Oceaunz =

Ball for association football produced by Adidas

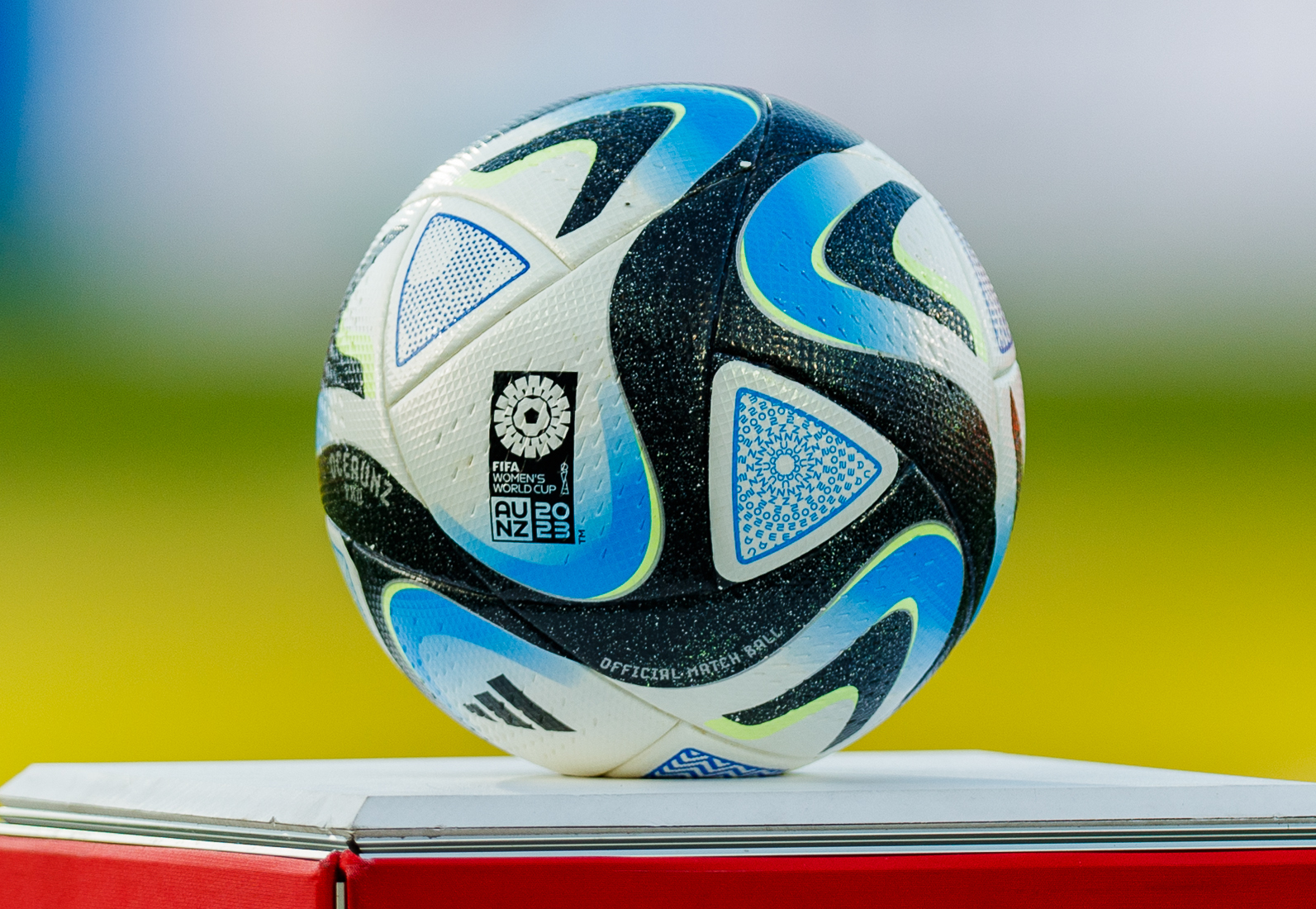
- Type: Football
- Inception: January 2023
- Manufacturer: Adidas
- Available: Yes

The Adidas Oceaunz was the official match ball of the 2023 FIFA Women's World Cup in Australia and New Zealand. It was unveiled by Adidas on 24 January 2023.

== Design and features ==
The ball's design was inspired by the unique Australasian landscape, with white, black, blue and yellow colors representing the vast mountains of New Zealand and Australia's connection to the Pacific Ocean. The name "Oceaunz" combines the prefixes "AU" and "NZ" of the two host nations.

The Australian patterns on the ball were created by renowned local artist Chern'ee Sutton, while the markings representing New Zealand were designed by Kiwi artist Fiona Collis.

The Oceaunz is made of thermally-bonded 20-panel synthetic leather, providing a consistent and stable surface for optimal control and accuracy.

== History ==
The Oceaunz is the ninth successive football that Adidas has produced for the FIFA Women's World Cup. The previous ball used in the 2019 Women's World Cup was the 2019 FIFA Women's World Cup Final in France.

The ball was also used in the J.League during the 2023 J1 League season.
