= Adidas Azteca =

Ball used in the 1986 FIFA World Cup

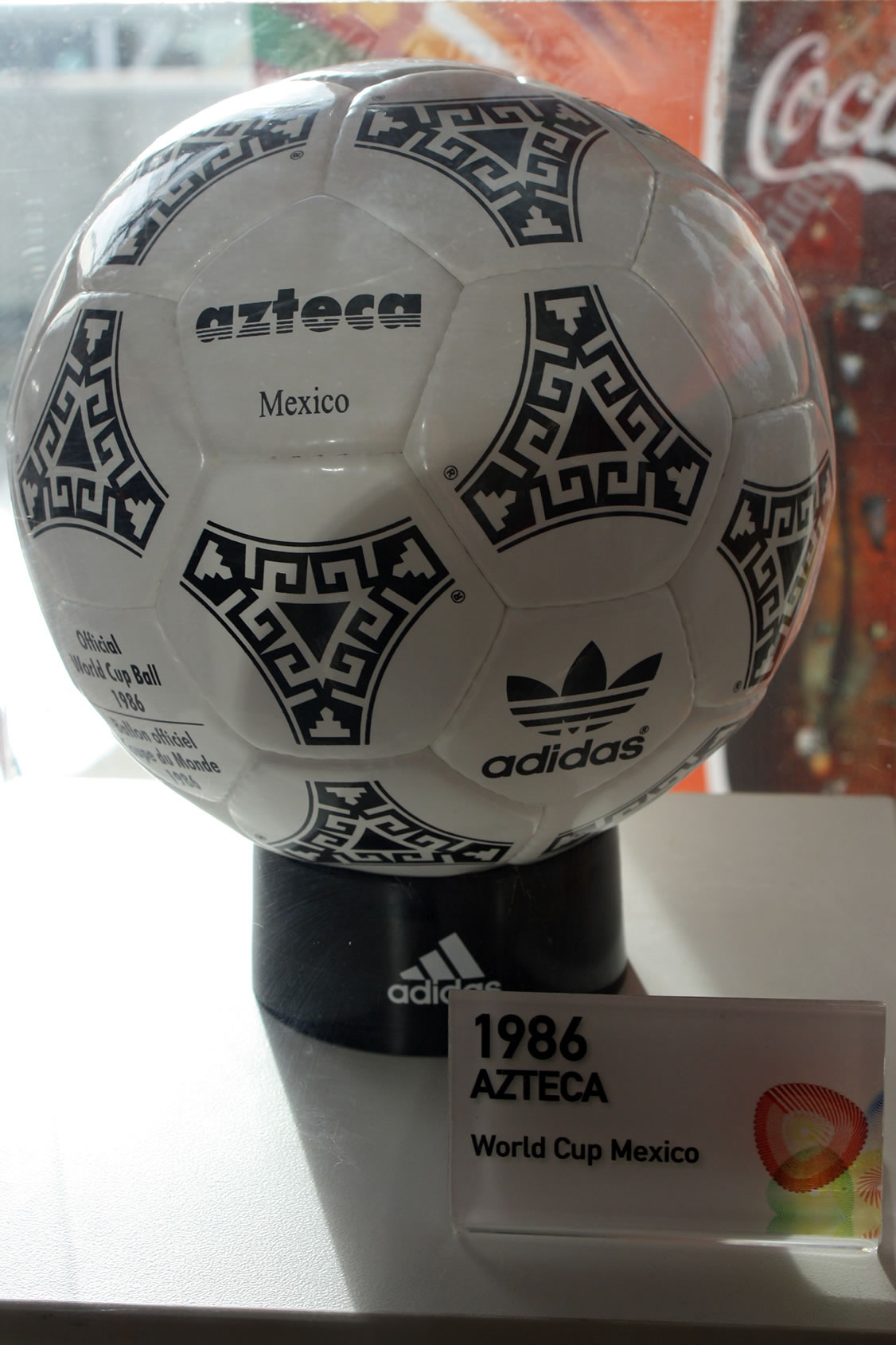
Adidas Azteca

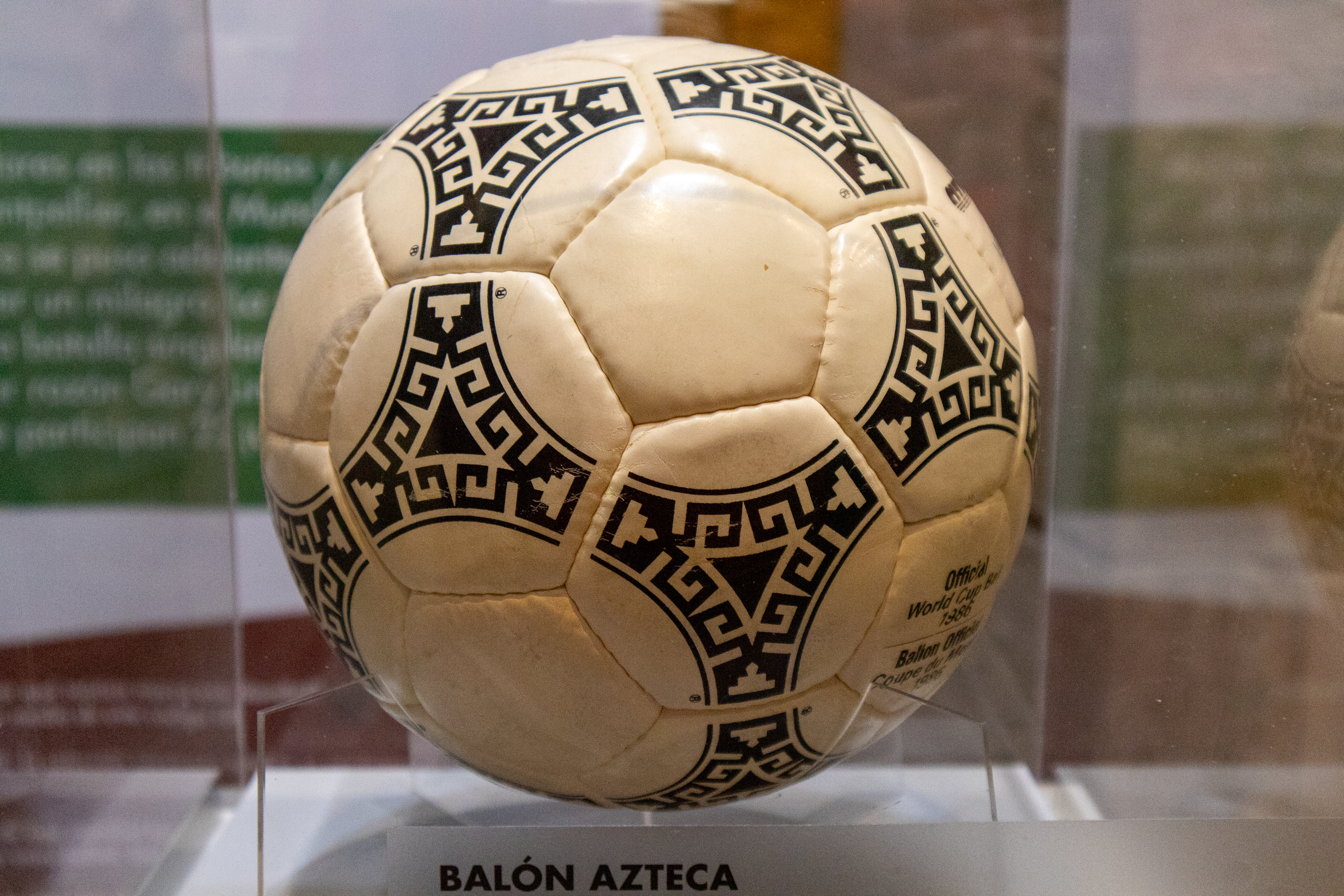
Adidas Azteca soccer ball used in the 1986 World Cup in Mexico.

Azteca Mexico (Spanish pronunciation: [asˈteka ˈmexiko]) by Adidas was the official match ball of 1986 FIFA World Cup held in Mexico. It was also the first fully synthetic FIFA World Cup ball.

The elaborately decorated design was inspired by the hosting nation’s native Aztec architecture and murals.

Preceded by Tango España	FIFA World Cup official ball 1986	Succeeded by Etrusco Unico
