= Adidas Tricolore =

Official match ball of 1998 FIFA World Cup

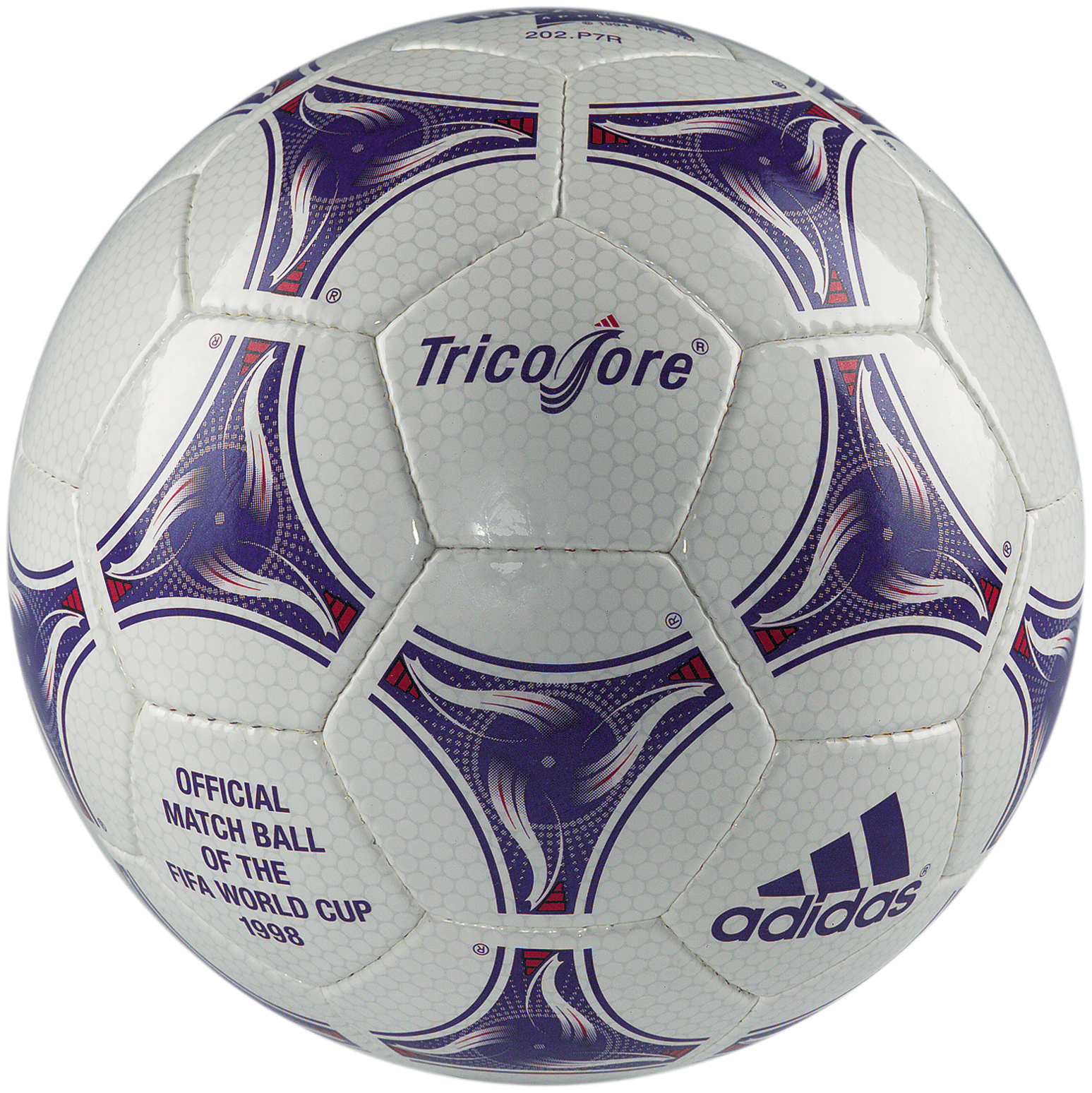
- Type: Association football
- Inventor: Adidas
- Inception: 1998
- Manufacturer: Adidas

Adidas Tricolore (French pronunciation: [adidas tʁikɔlɔʁ]) was the official match ball of 1998 FIFA World Cup in France. The Tricolore was officially unveiled in December 1997, being the first colorized ball used in a FIFA World Cup.

== Overview ==
The tricolour flag and cockerel, traditional symbols of France were used as inspiration for the design. Made by Adidas, it was the first multi-coloured ball to be used in the tournament's final stage and was also the final World Cup ball to bear the classic Tango design, introduced in the 1978 tournament. The design of blue triads decorated with cockerel motifs was adopted to represent the colours of the flag of France. Tricolore was also the first Adidas World Cup match ball manufactured outside of Europe (made in Pakistan, Morocco & Indonesia) since the 1970 Adidas Telstar. "Tricolore" means "three-colored" in French.

More than twenty roughs had been proposed by the Adidas design team before the definitive version was approved. The aim was to amalgamate symbols of the French culture and heritage, adopting the colors used in the French Revolution. The Gallic rooster and the TGV were some of the symbols chosen to represent the French identity on the ball.

Adidas Tango Argentina, that was built using the same technology of Adidas Tricolore, was used as official match ball of Argentine Primera División until 2003–04 Argentine Primera División.

Preceded by Questra	FIFA World Cup official ball 1998	Succeeded by Fevernova
