= Adidas Telstar =

Soccer ball by Adidas

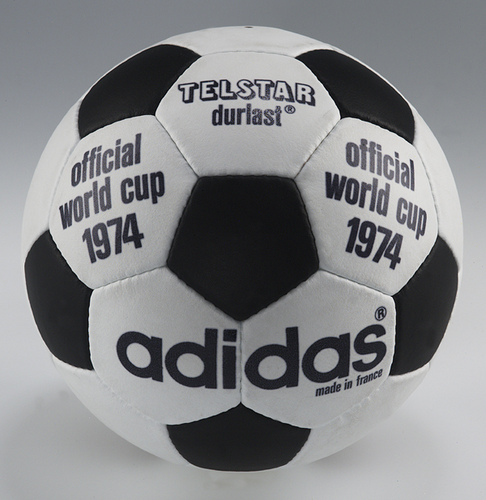
- The 1974 World Cup Adidas Telstar
- Type: Football
- Inventor: Eigil Nielsen
- Inception: 1968; 58 years ago
- Manufacturer: Adidas
- Available: Yes
- Current supplier: Adidas
- Last production year: 2018
- Models: Telstar Elast; Telstar; Telstar Durlast; Telstar 18

Telstar is a ball made by Adidas. The 32-panel alternating black-and-white design of the ball, based on the work of Eigil Nielsen, has since become a global standard design used to portray a football in different media.

== History ==
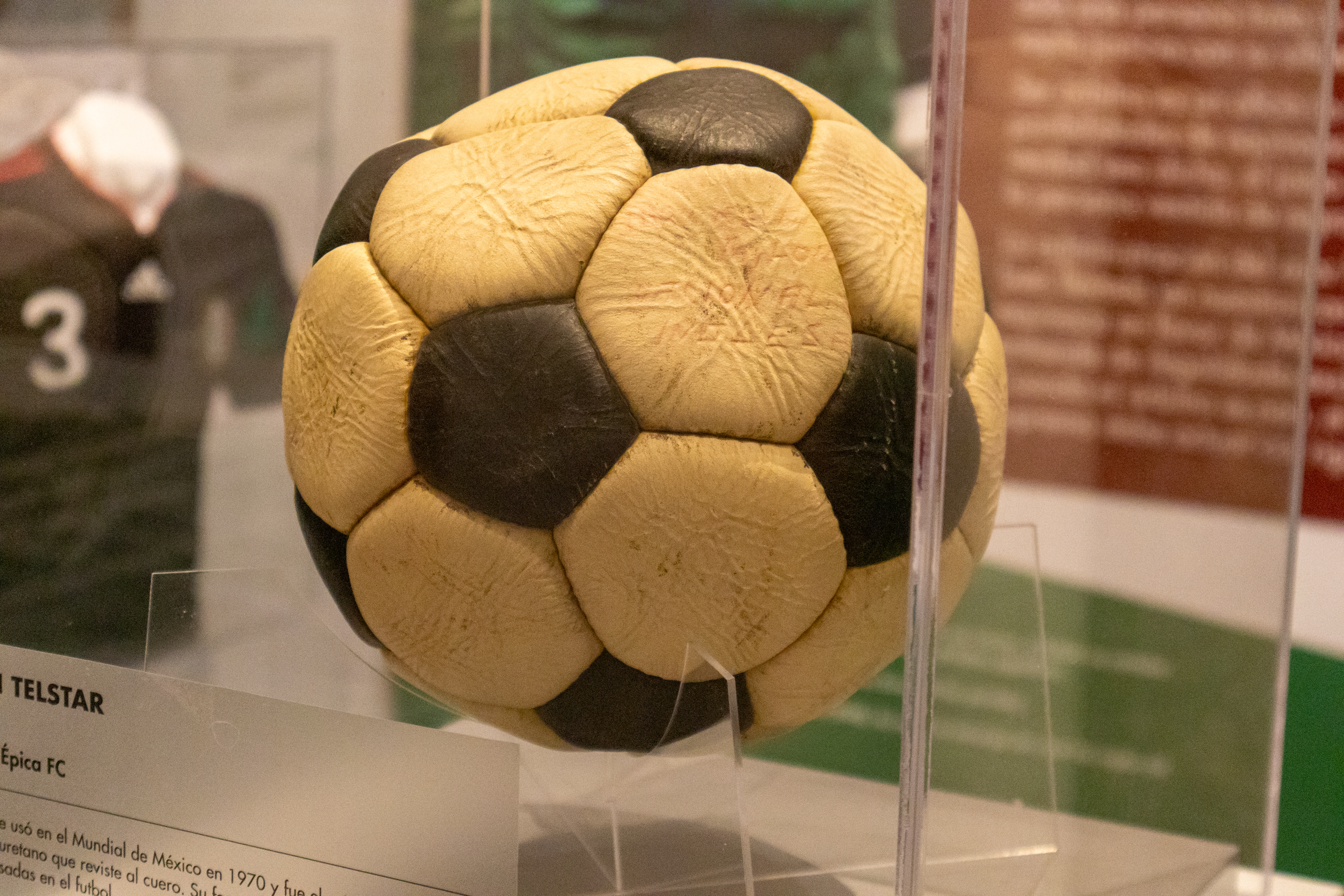
Adidas Telstar soccer ball used at the 1970 World Cup in Mexico

The ball was first introduced as the "Telstar Elast" for the 1968 European Football Championship. A slightly different ball named "Telstar" was used as the official match ball of the 1970 FIFA World Cup in Mexico. The similar "Telstar Durlast" was one of two official balls, along with the Chile Durlast, of the 1974 FIFA World Cup held in West Germany. The ball was also used in the 1972 and 1976 European Championships.

The Telstar was the first World Cup ball to use the now-familiar truncated icosahedron for its design, consisting of 12 black pentagonal and 20 white hexagonal panels. The 32-panel configuration had been introduced in 1962 by Select Sport, and was also used in the official logo for the 1970 World Cup. The black-and-white pattern, to aid visibility on black and white television broadcasts (colour television was still rare worldwide during this time), was also well established before the Telstar.

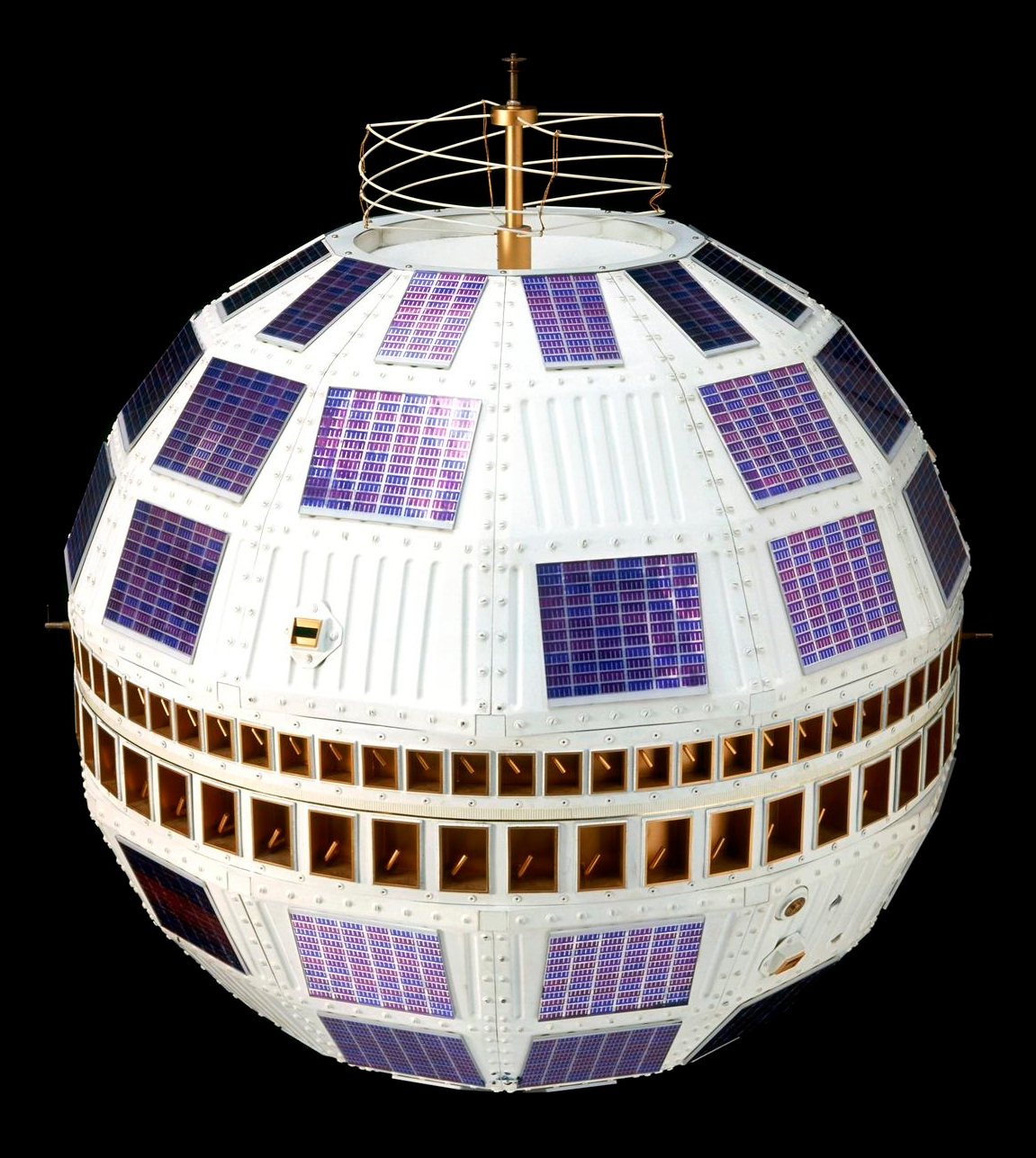
The Telstar satellite for which the ball was named

The name came from the 1962 Telstar communications satellite, which was roughly spherical and dotted with solar panels, somewhat similar in appearance to the football. Developed by Bell Telephone Laboratories for AT&T Corporation, Telstar was the world's first active communications satellite and was the first to send live television signals, telephone calls, and fax images through space, which inaugurated an age of instant worldwide communications via satellite.

The ball was made of leather. The 1974 model's "Durlast" polyurethane coating provided waterproofing as well as protection from damage such as scuffs and tears.

Only 20 Telstars were provided for the World Cup; an estimated 600,000 replicas were sold subsequently. Some 1970 matches were played with a brown ball. The Chile Durlast was all white and was used during the Italy-Germany semi-final for the first 20 minutes, then it was replaced by a 32 panel black and white due to a deflation.

A new version of the Telstar, named Telstar 18, was the official match ball for the 2018 FIFA World Cup. The design maintains the general pattern, except the corners of the pentagons are stretched into pixellated gradients.

Telstar is now considered a classic design. Although most footballs used in current championships have different designs and sections, in representations of footballs in cartoons, comics, caricatures and decorations in general, footballs inspired by Adidas Telstar are usually used, becoming a universal icon for football to this day.

Preceded by Challenge 4-Star	FIFA World Cup official ball 1970–1974	Succeeded by Tango
Preceded by No official ball	UEFA European Championship official ball 1968, 1972, 1976	Succeeded by Tango River Plate
