= Adidas Beau Jeu =

Official match ball of the UEFA Euro 2016

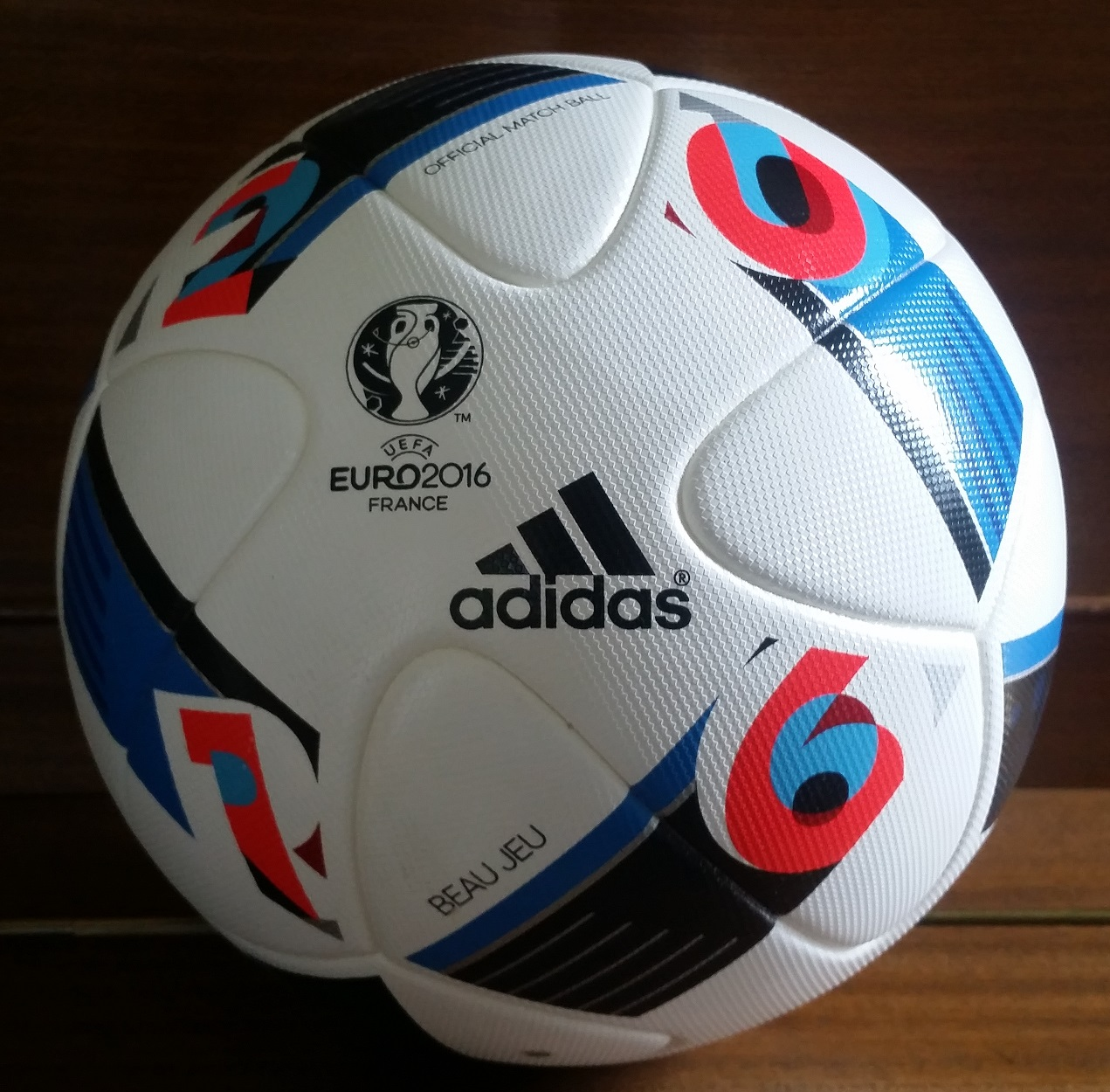
- Type: Football
- Inventor: Adidas
- Inception: 2015; 11 years ago
- Manufacturer: Adidas

The Adidas Beau Jeu (French pronunciation: [adidaz bo ʒø]) is one of the official match balls of the UEFA Euro 2016 tournament. It was used for the group stage of the tournament, after which it was replaced by the "Adidas Fracas" (a design variant of the Beau Jeu) for the knockout stage. The French phrase "Beau Jeu" translates to "Beautiful Game" or "Beautiful Play".

== Overview ==
Unveiled by Adidas and presented by former French national player Zinedine Zidane on 12 November 2015, the ball features elements of the Adidas Brazuca, but in a new design. The design includes blue lines with orange detail with letters and numbers on each line creating "EURO" and "2016".

In the group match between Switzerland and France on 19 June, the ball burst during a challenge between Antoine Griezmann and Valon Behrami.

The "Errejota" – official ball of the 2015 FIFA Club World Cup, the 2016 Summer Olympics and Paralympics – was based on the Beau Jeu but with a surface design change. Lately, it was the base for the "Krasava", official match ball of the 2016 FIFA Club World Cup and the 2017 FIFA Confederations Cup.

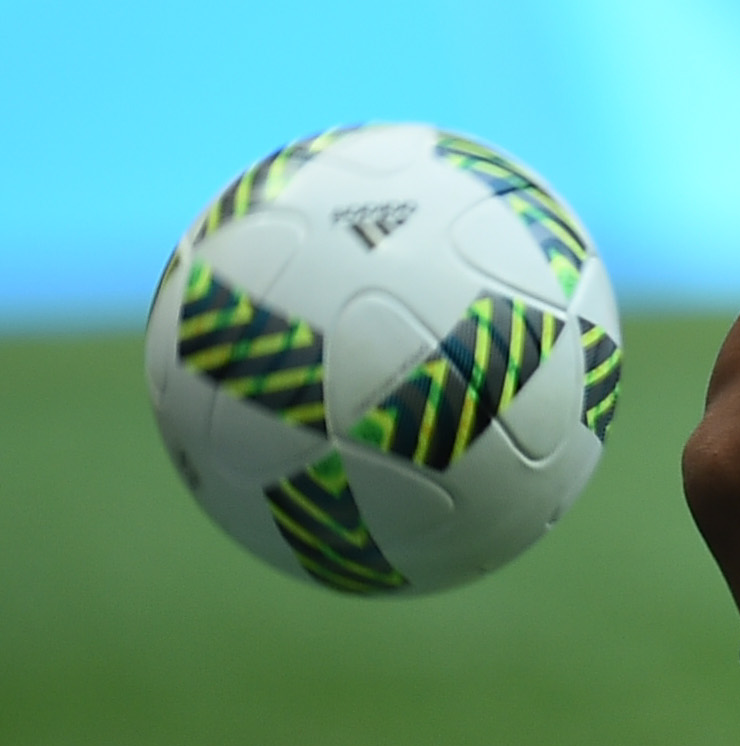
Errejota

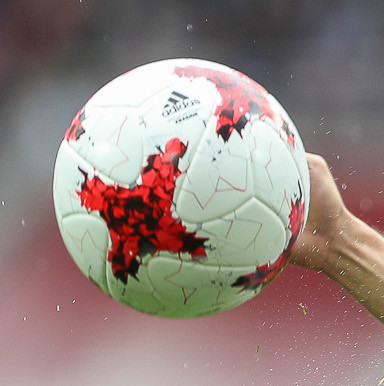
Krasava

Preceded by Tango 12	UEFA European Championship official ball 2016	Succeeded by Uniforia
