= Adidas Etrusco Unico =

Ball used in the 1990 FIFA World Cup

The Etrusco Unico was an association football made by Adidas in the early 1990s. It was the official match ball of the 1990 FIFA World Cup in Italy, the 1990 Asian Games in Beijing,China, the 1991 Copa America in Chile, the 1991 FIFA Women's World Cup in China, the UEFA Euro 1992 in Sweden and the 1992 Summer Olympics in Barcelona, Spain.

== Design ==
The name and intricate design took their inspiration from Italy’s ancient history and the fine art of the Etruscans. Three Etruscan lion heads decorate each of the 20 Tango triads. It was the first ball with an internal layer of black polyurethane foam.

== Adidas ==
In Adidas tradition, there was also an accompanying football boot of the same name, which incorporated some of the design elements of the ball - the triads of the ball with the lion heads, along with the Etrusco Unico script were reproduced on the tongue. It was the official boot of the 1990 FIFA World Cup and was widely used by players in the competition.

The band Etrusco Unico is named after the ball.

== Gallery ==
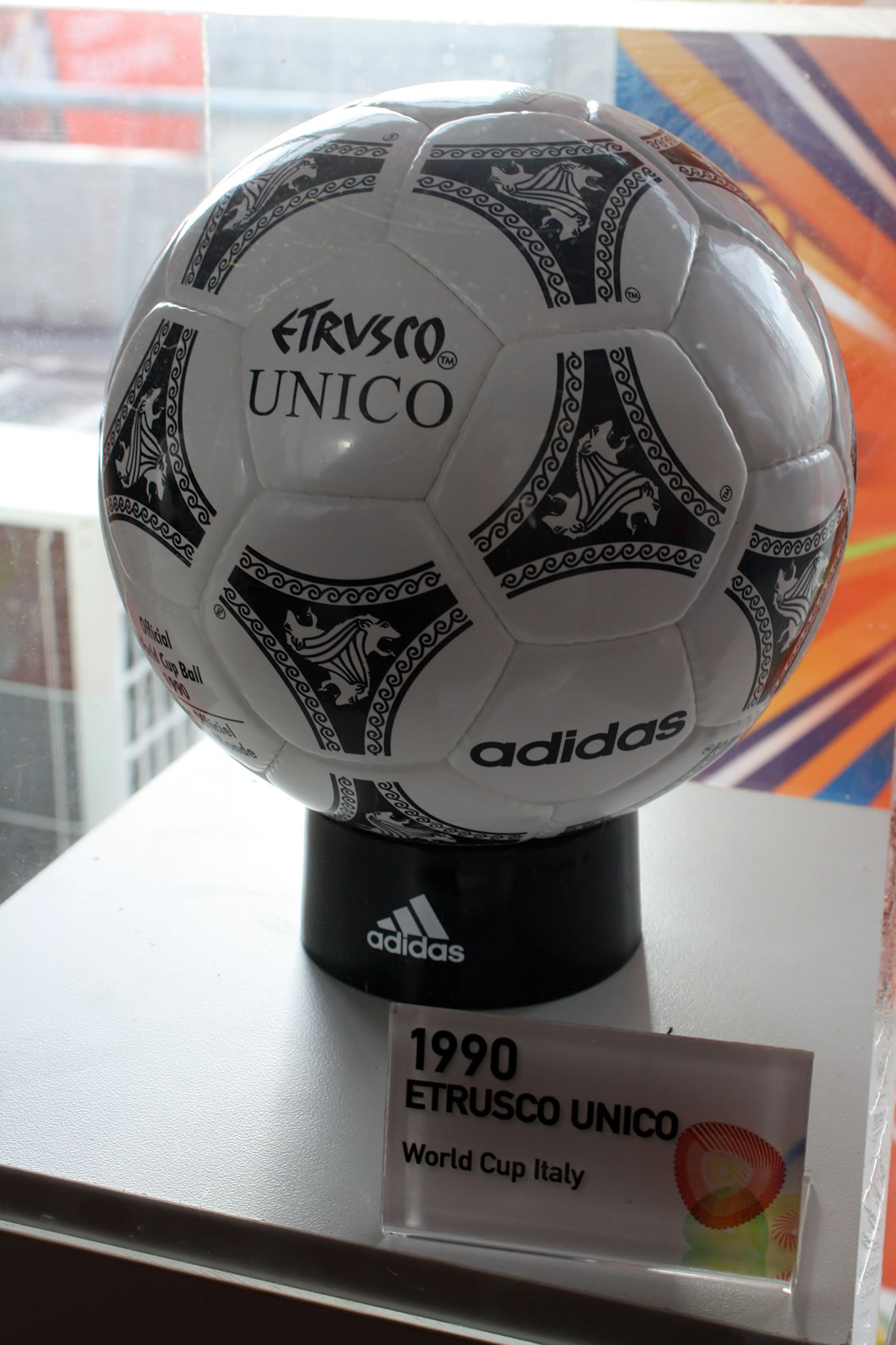
Adidas Etrusco Unico

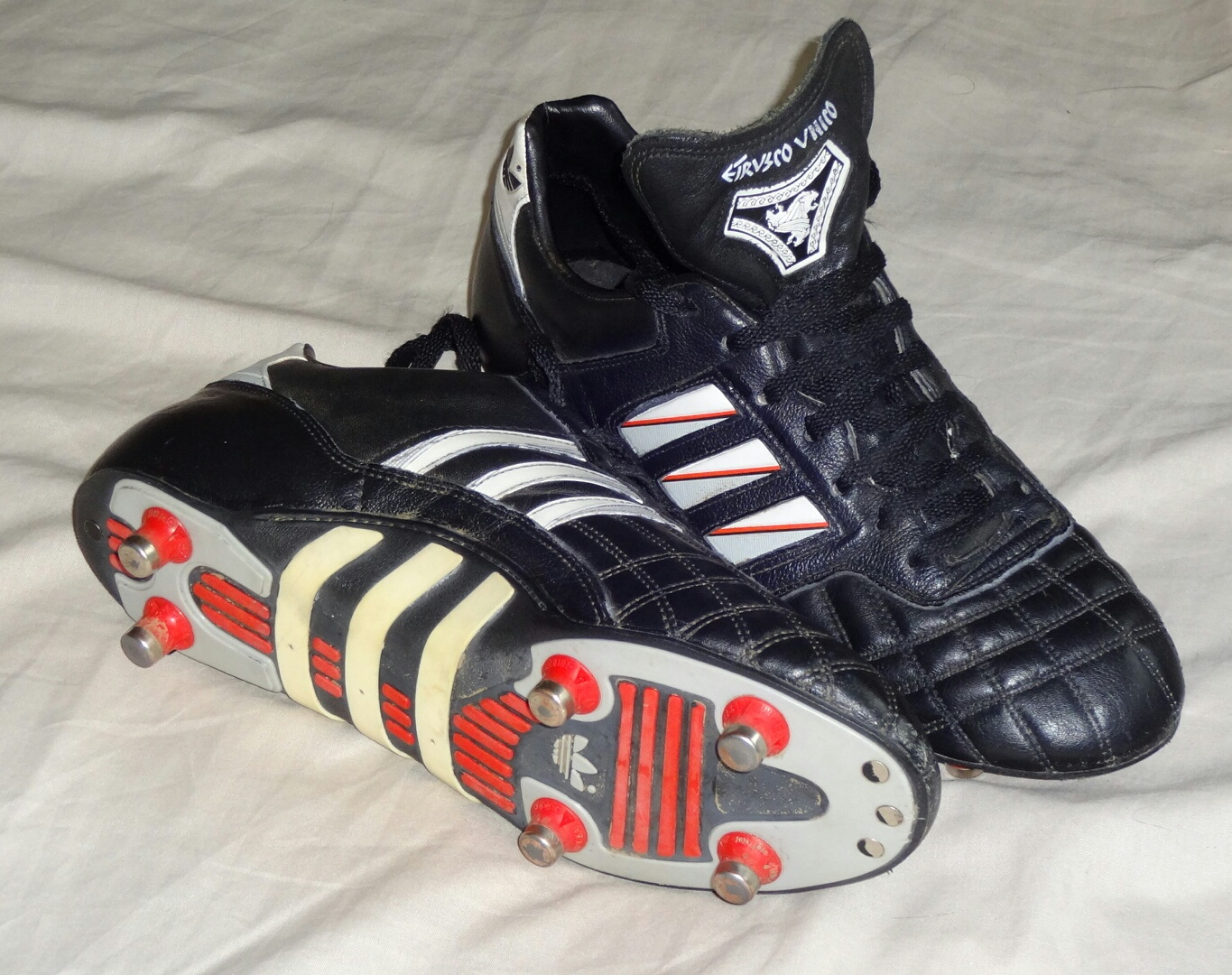
Etrusco Unico Football Boot

Preceded by Azteca	FIFA World Cup official ball 1990	Succeeded by Questra
Preceded by Tango Europa	UEFA European Championship official ball 1992	Succeeded by Questra Europa
