= Adidas Telstar 18 =

Official ball of 2018 FIFA World Cup

Telstar 18
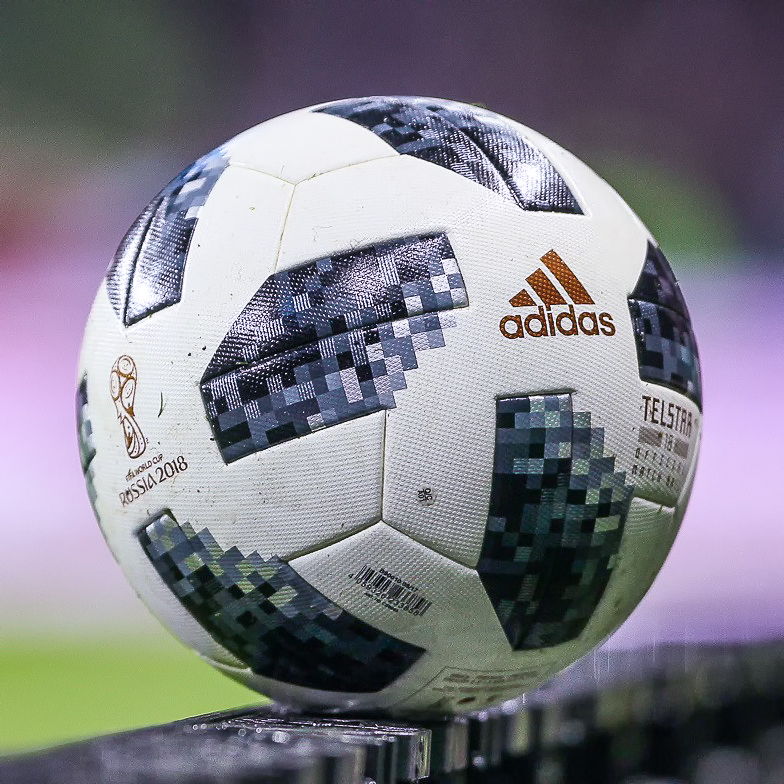
- The Adidas Telstar 18.
- Type: Association football
- Inception: 2017
- Manufacturer: Adidas
- Available: Yes
- Current supplier: Forward Sports
- Last production year: 2018

The Adidas Telstar 18 was the official match ball of the 2018 FIFA World Cup, which was held in Russia. It was designed by the company Adidas, a FIFA Partner and FIFA World Cup official match ball supplier since 1970, and based on the concept of the first Adidas's World Cup match ball. The manufacturer of the ball was Forward Sports, a sports equipment supplier based in Sialkot, Pakistan.

The Telstar 18 was presented in Moscow on 9 November 2017 by Lionel Messi. Retired Brazilian footballer Ronaldo opened the 2018 FIFA World Cup by introducing a Telstar 18 that was sent into space to the International Space Station crew in March 2018, and returned to Earth in June.

== Naming ==
The name of the ball was revealed on 9 November 2017 at the official presentation in Moscow by Lionel Messi, winner of the Golden Ball at the 2014 FIFA World Cup, and attended by winners of the World Cup in different years: Zinedine Zidane, Kaká, Alessandro Del Piero, Xabi Alonso and Lukas Podolski. The Telstar 18 pays homage to Adidas's first World Cup match ball, named the Telstar, which was itself named for its resemblance to the original Telstar communications satellite. The word "Telstar" is a combination of the words "television" and "star".

== Design and manufacture ==
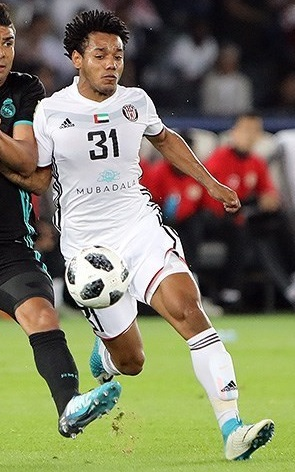
The Adidas Telstar 18 being used in the 2017 FIFA Club World Cup semi-final between Al-Jazira and Real Madrid.

The original Telstar used in the 1970 FIFA World Cup was the first football to show a black and white pattern. This was done to ensure that television audiences would know where the ball was while games were being played, due to many televisions at the time sporting a black and white screen (colour television was still rare in many parts of the world in this era). Although the Telstar had 32 panels, the Telstar 18 has six textured panels. They are not stitched, but seamlessly glued together.

The ball has an embedded near-field communication (NFC) chip for marketing purposes. However, it is of no value to players, providing no information about their kicks or headers of the ball, although Adidas has provided this in a previous football. Consumers who purchase a Telstar 18 are able to connect to the chip using a smart phone to access content and information that is unique to that ball, personalized and localized, providing the consumer with interactivity themed on the then-upcoming World Cup competition.

The Telstar 18 balls are manufactured in Pakistan and China.

== Criticism of performance ==
Although Adidas stated that the Telstar 18 was scientifically designed to be predictable in flight and was "the most perfect piece of equipment ever used in the game," international goalkeepers including Marc-André ter Stegen, Pepe Reina and David de Gea assessed prior to the tournament that the ball changed direction unpredictably and could be slippery due to the smooth coating and lack of seams. Dani Alves, full-back for Brazil, was quoted as believing that "Telstar 18 is an absolute joy for those shooting with it, but a nightmare for those who have to second guess its trajectory and try and stop it". According to Joaquín Maroto of Diario AS, the ball "encourages players to shoot from distance because if the ball is struck well, it fizzes through the air but loses none of its intensity on impact", citing Thomas Müller's goal for Germany from range in a March 2018 friendly against Spain. Criticism of the Telstar 18's instability continued after several long-distance goals in early rounds of the World Cup. According to news channel Russia 24, this was part of an intentional shift in the balance of the game.

Further commentary on the ball's performance arose after two balls burst in a first-round game between France and Australia, and another ball failed in the match between Argentina and Iceland. A fourth Telstar 18 was found to have lost pressure in the match between Uruguay and Saudi Arabia on 20 June.

== Telstar Mechta ==
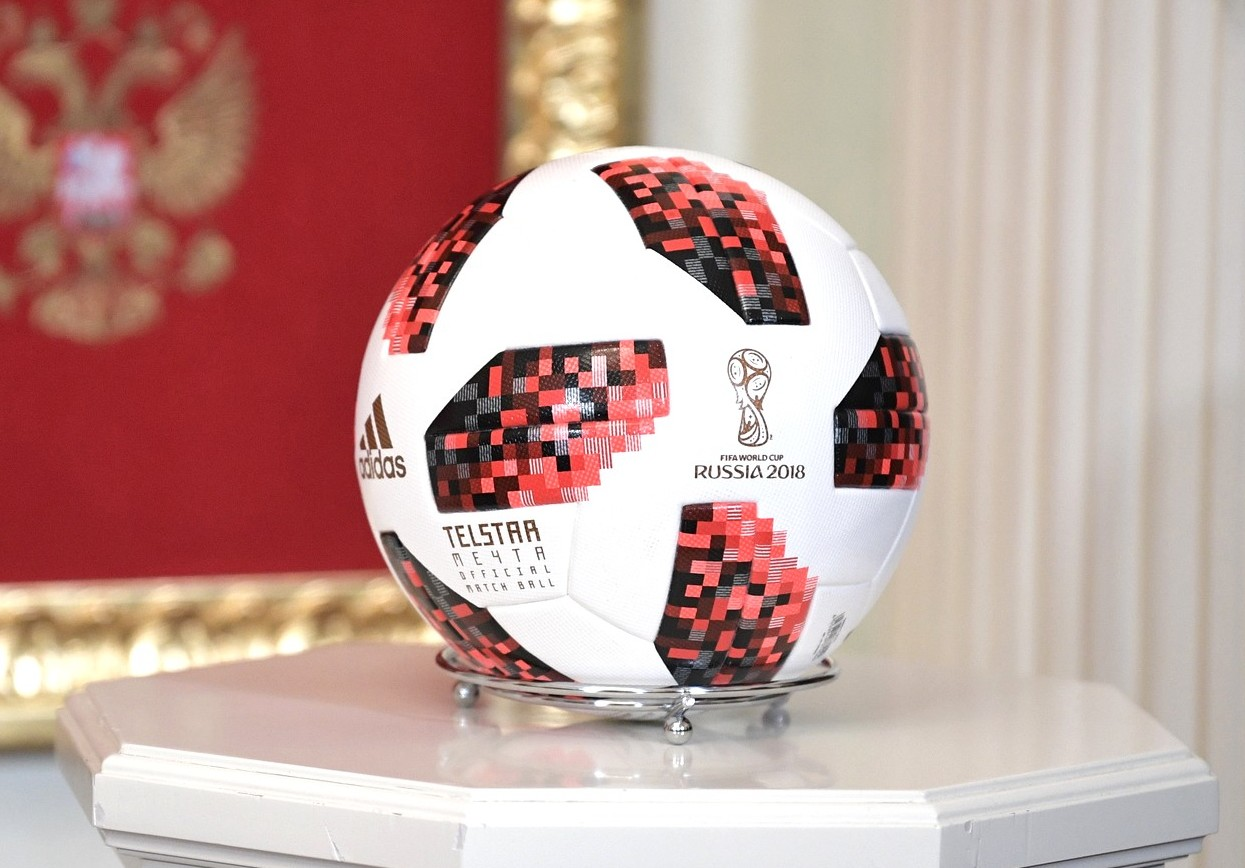
Telstar Mechta

At the end of the 2018 World Cup group stage, FIFA revealed a new design to be used in the knockout stage: the Telstar Mechta (Мечта). "Mechta" means dream or ambition in Russian.

At the 2018 Russia–United States Summit, Russian president Vladimir Putin gave a Telstar Mechta to U.S. president Donald Trump, despite their national team failing to qualify for the tournament. The ball, which included the standard chip and transmission devices, incited a political controversy within the U.S. over fears of spying.

== See also ==
- Adidas Telstar
- List of FIFA World Cup official match balls

Preceded by Brazuca	FIFA World Cup official ball 2018	Succeeded by Al Rihla
