= Adidas Tango 12 =

Official match association football of the UEFA Euro 2012

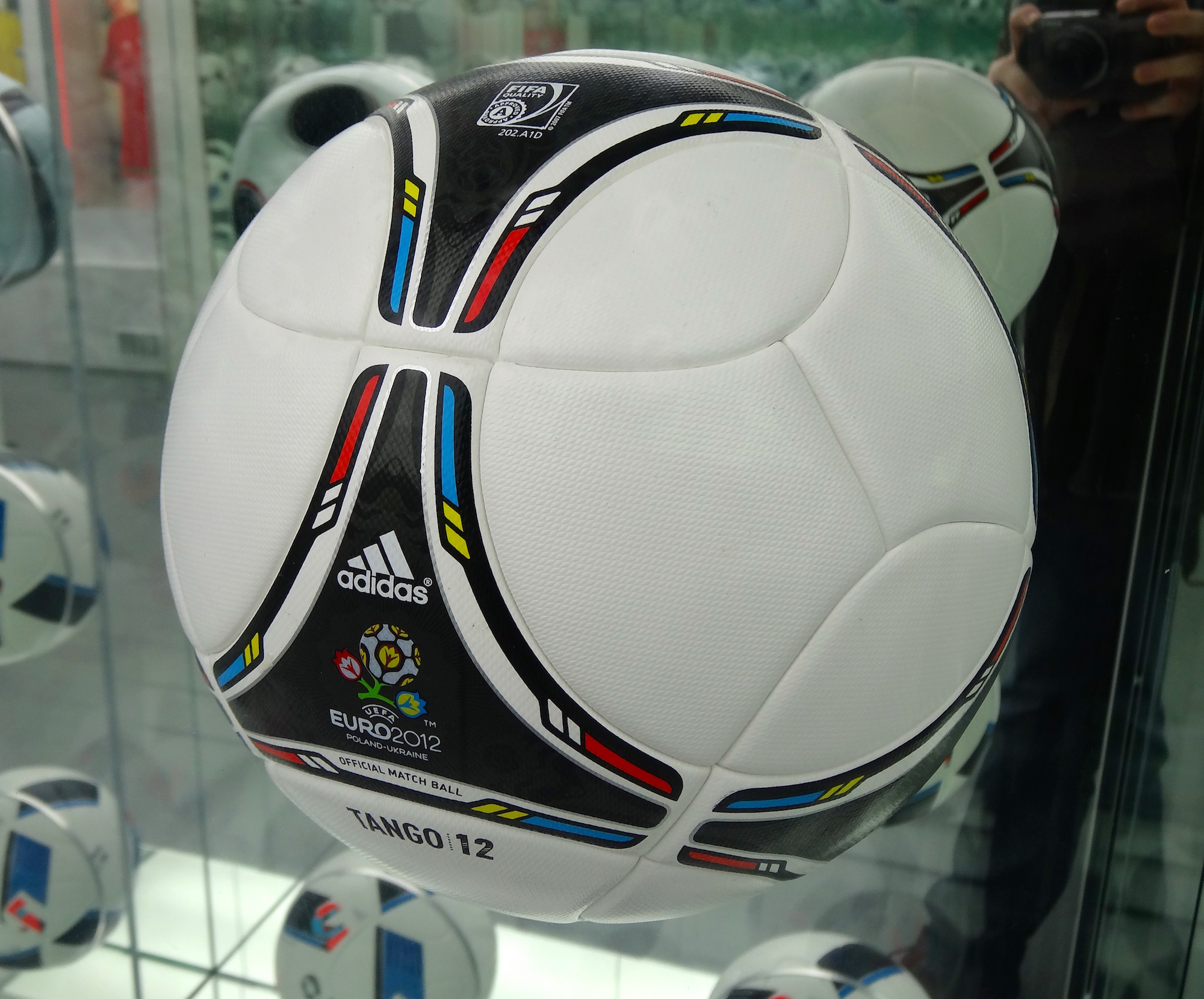
- Type: Association football
- Inventor: Adidas
- Inception: 2012; 14 years ago
- Manufacturer: Adidas

The Adidas Tango 12 (Polish pronunciation: [ˈtaŋɡɔ dvaˈnaɕtɕɛ]) was the official match ball of the UEFA Euro 2012, with variants being used for the 2012 Summer Olympics. The ball is named after the original and successful Adidas Tango family of footballs from the late 1970s, but the construction of the Tango 12 is completely different. Variations of the ball have been used in other contemporary competitions including the Africa Cup of Nations and the Summer Olympics – Adidas has not categorised these football as the "Adidas Tango 12" family, however they are listed here due to their similar design.

The ball was officially presented on 2 December 2011, during the group draw for the final tournament in Kyiv. UEFA count the Tango 12 as the fourth incarnation of the ball although there have been other variations made in-between, The ball is reportedly designed to be easier to dribble and control than its predecessor the Adidas Jabulani (used during the 2010 FIFA World Cup in South Africa). Tango 12 uses a construction design based on the Adidas Jabulani but heavily modified, thirty-two 2D panels instead of eight 3D panels.

The Adidas Tango 12 features a modern interpretation of the design including a coloured outline inspired by the flags of the two host nations – Poland and Ukraine. Etched into the Tango design are three bespoke graphics which celebrate the decorative art of paper cutting, a tradition in the rural areas of both host countries which the designers say creates a link to the key characteristics of football – unity, rivalry and passion.

== Versions ==
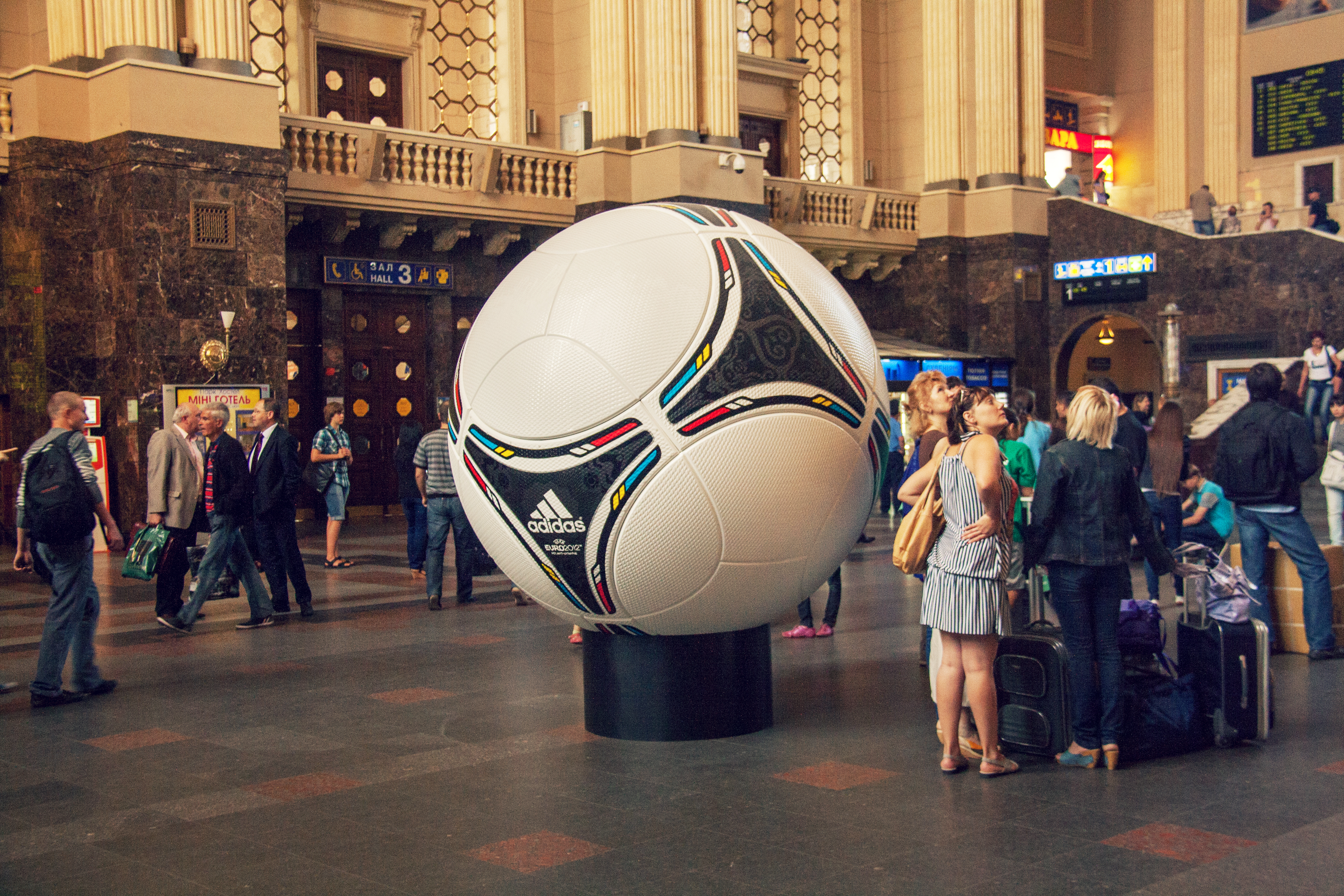
A giant Adidas Tango 12 in a terminal hall of Kyiv

| Year | Tango variation | Competition | Additional information |
|---|---|---|---|
| 1978–1988 | See Adidas Tango for the original family of balls | See Adidas Tango | |
| 2011 | Tango 12 Super Cup | 2011 UEFA Super Cup | |
| 2011 | Tango 12 Europa League | 2011–12 UEFA Europa League | |
| 2011 | Tango 12 AFA | 2011–12 Argentine Primera División season | |
| 2011 | Torfabrik | 2011–12 Bundesliga | |
| 2012 | Comoequa | 2012 Africa Cup of Nations | |
| 2012 | The Albert | 2012 Summer Olympics and Paralympics | |
| 2012 | Prime | 2012 Major League Soccer | The championship match ball was used by LA Galaxy in all home games and in MLS Cup 2012 |
| 2012 | Tango 12 Final Kyiv | UEFA Euro 2012 Final | Variation of the Adidas Tango 12 used in Euro 2012 |
| 2012 | Tango 12 Sala | 2012 FIFA Futsal World Cup | |
| 2012 | Le 80 ("The 80") | 2012–13 Ligue 1 | |
| 2013 | Adidas Cafusa | 2013 FIFA Confederations Cup | |
| 2013 | Adidas Kotohogi | 2013 J.League Division 1 | |
| 2013 | Adidas Tafugo | 2013–14 Argentine Primera División season | |

The Tango variation for the 2011 UEFA Super Cup, the 2011–12 UEFA Europa League as well as the Torfabrik for the 2011–12 Bundesliga, use an older triangular grip texture instead of the newer, granular surface found on the Tango 12. Their construction is the same as the Tango 12; however, their appearance is similar to the Jabulani (excluding the UEFA Super Cup ball that applies respective colours and design).

=== Torfabrik ===
Torfabrik (English: Goal factory) has been the Adidas ball for the Bundesliga since the 2011–12 season. This replaced the 2010–11 season's Jabulani Torfabrik, based on the older Jabulani.

=== Adidas Cafusa ===
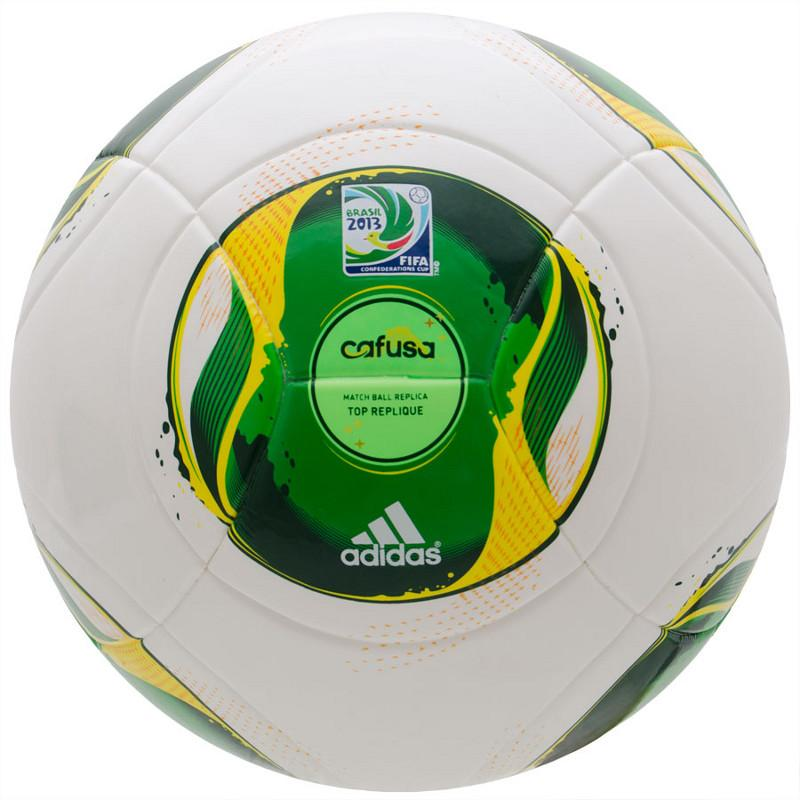
Adidas Cafusa, the official match ball of the 2013 FIFA Confederations Cup

For the 2013 FIFA Confederations Cup, Adidas produced the Cafusa. The ball used the same technology and materials as the Tango 12 although with a different design. Cafusa was unveiled during the draw for the competition. The name "Cafusa" (pronounced [kɐˈfuzɐ]) is a syllabic abbreviation of the words "carnaval" (Carnival), "futebol" (football) and "samba". Former Brazil captain Cafu unveiled the ball.

Cafusa was also used for the 2012 FIFA Club World Cup, the 2013–14 Russian Premier League, the 2013 Copa del Rey final, the 2013 Paraguay Apertura, and the 2012–13 Venezuelan First Division.

== See also ==
- Adidas Prime

| Preceded by Europass | UEFA European Championship official ball 2012 | Succeeded by Beau Jeu |
