= Adidas Brazuca =

Official ball of 2014 FIFA World Cup

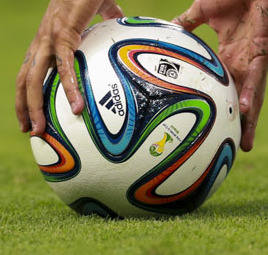
- The Adidas Brazuca, being used in the 2014 FIFA World Cup quarter final between Brazil and Colombia
- Type: Ball
- Inception: 2012
- Manufacturer: Adidas
- Available: No longer available as new
- Last production year: 2014

The Adidas Brazuca (Portuguese pronunciation: [bɾɐˈzukɐ]) was the official match ball of the 2014 FIFA World Cup, which was held in Brazil. It was designed by the company Adidas, a FIFA Partner and FIFA World Cup official match ball supplier since 1970.

== Naming ==
The name of the ball was announced on 2 September 2012. It was selected by a public vote organised by the Local Organising Committee and Adidas, with over one million Brazilian football fans voting. The name Brazuca was chosen with 77.8% of the vote. The two other voting options were Bossa Nova (14.6% of the vote) and Carnavalesca (7.6% of the vote).

According to FIFA, "the informal term 'brazuca' (our fellow) is used by Brazilians to describe national pride in the Brazilian way of life", and "mirroring their approach to football, it symbolises emotion, pride and goodwill to all". The term is also used as slang for "Brazilian" and became well-known abroad due to the Brazilian diaspora.

== Technical aspects ==
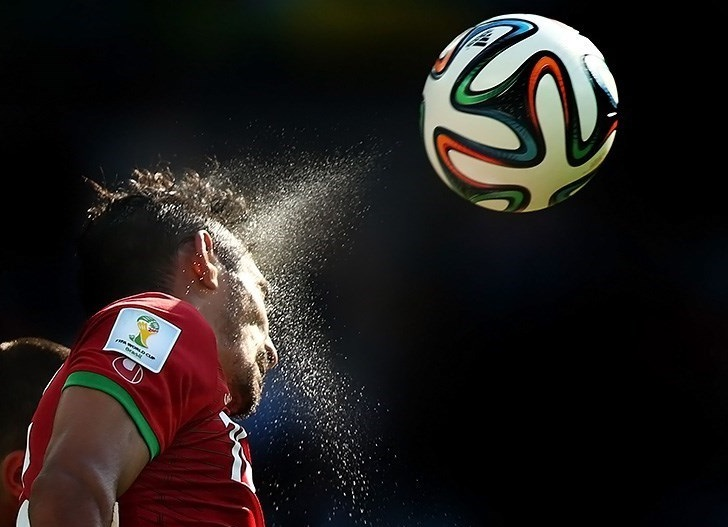
Iran striker Reza Ghoochannejhad heading Adidas Brazuca in the Group F match against Argentina

The ball is a developmental successor to the Adidas Tango 12 series of balls, with the same bladder and carcass but a different surface structure. The ball weighs 437 grams and has a circumference of 69 centimetres. The ball has been made of six polyurethane panels which have been thermally bonded; the reduction in the number of panels is claimed to increase the consistency in the ball. The Brazuca ball has been stated to avoid aerodynamic problems with the Jabulani ball used in South Africa for the previous World Cup. It is textured to feel more like the Adidas Finale 13, the official UEFA Champions League ball, than the Jabulani.

	FIFA-approved standard	Brazuca measurements
Circumference	68.5–69.5 cm	69.0 ± 0.2 cm
Water absorption	≤ 10% weight increase	~ 0.2% weight increase
Weight	420–445 g	437 ± 0.2 g
Rebound test	135–155 cm	~ 141 cm
Loss of pressure	≤ 20%	≤ 7%

== Design ==
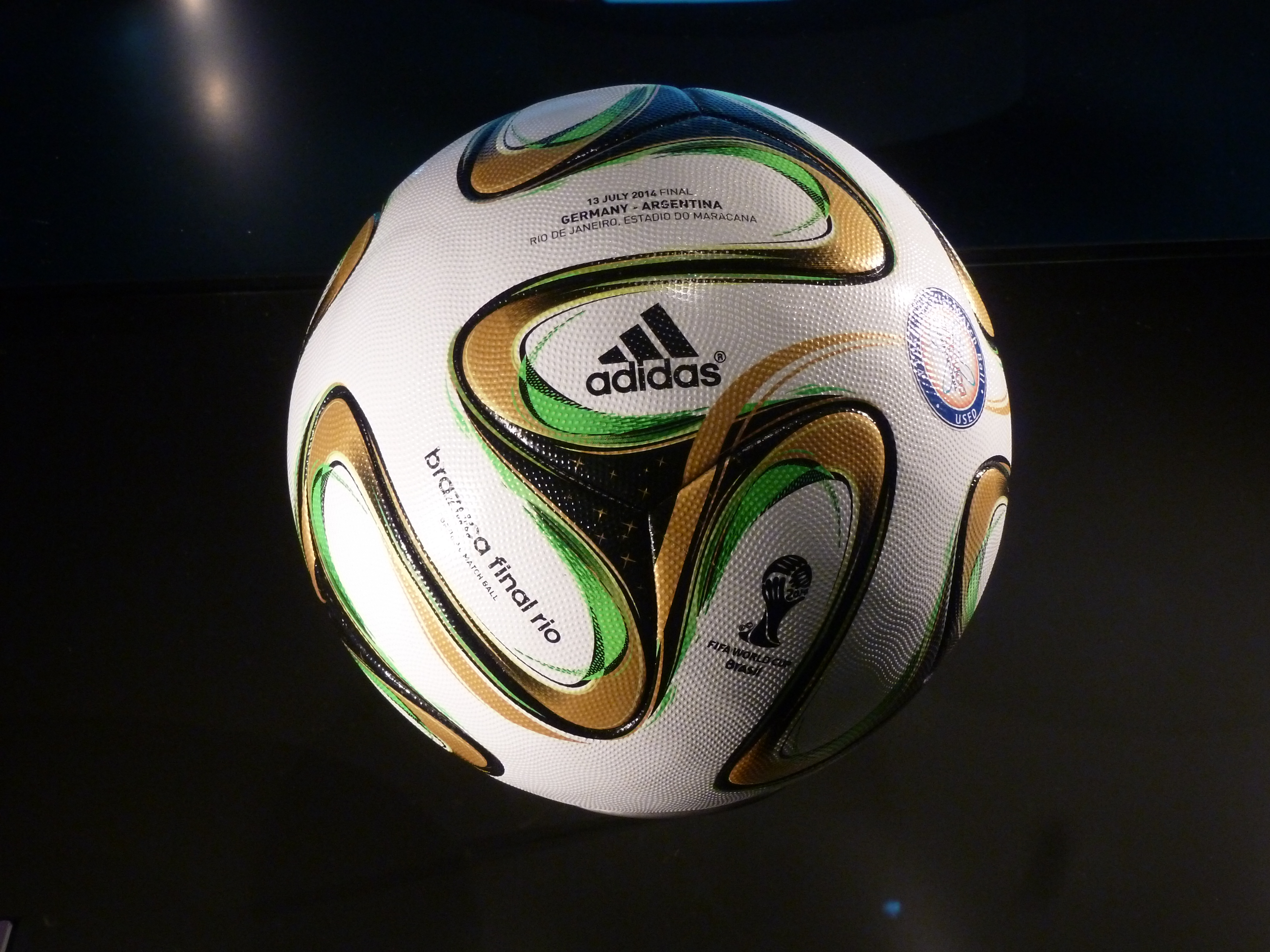
The Adidas Brazuca Final Rio used in the 2014 FIFA World Cup Final

The ball has a multi-colour design referenced from the traditional wish bracelet to represent Brazil. The colours used in the match balls are blue, green, red, white and black.

=== Final match – Brazuca Final Rio ===
The match ball for the 2014 FIFA World Cup Final, announced on 29 May 2014, featured a variation of the Adidas Brazuca named the Adidas Brazuca Final Rio. Whilst the technical aspects of the ball are the same, the colour is different from the Brazuca balls used in the group stages and other playoffs, with a green, gold and black colouring. It is the third special ball for FIFA World Cup final matches, after the +Teamgeist Berlin (2006) and the Jo'bulani (2010).

== Testing ==
The Brazuca went through an extensive testing process before its use at the World Cup. Adidas had been developing the ball for over 2 years, and had worked with many teams and players to ensure the ball was acceptable. The ball has appeared in the FIFA U-20 World Cup, DFB-Pokal final as well as disguised as the Adidas Cafusa in international friendly matches. Each team participating in the World Cup finals were delivered a set of Brazuca balls after the unveiling in December 2013 to have sufficient time to practice with it.

== Production ==
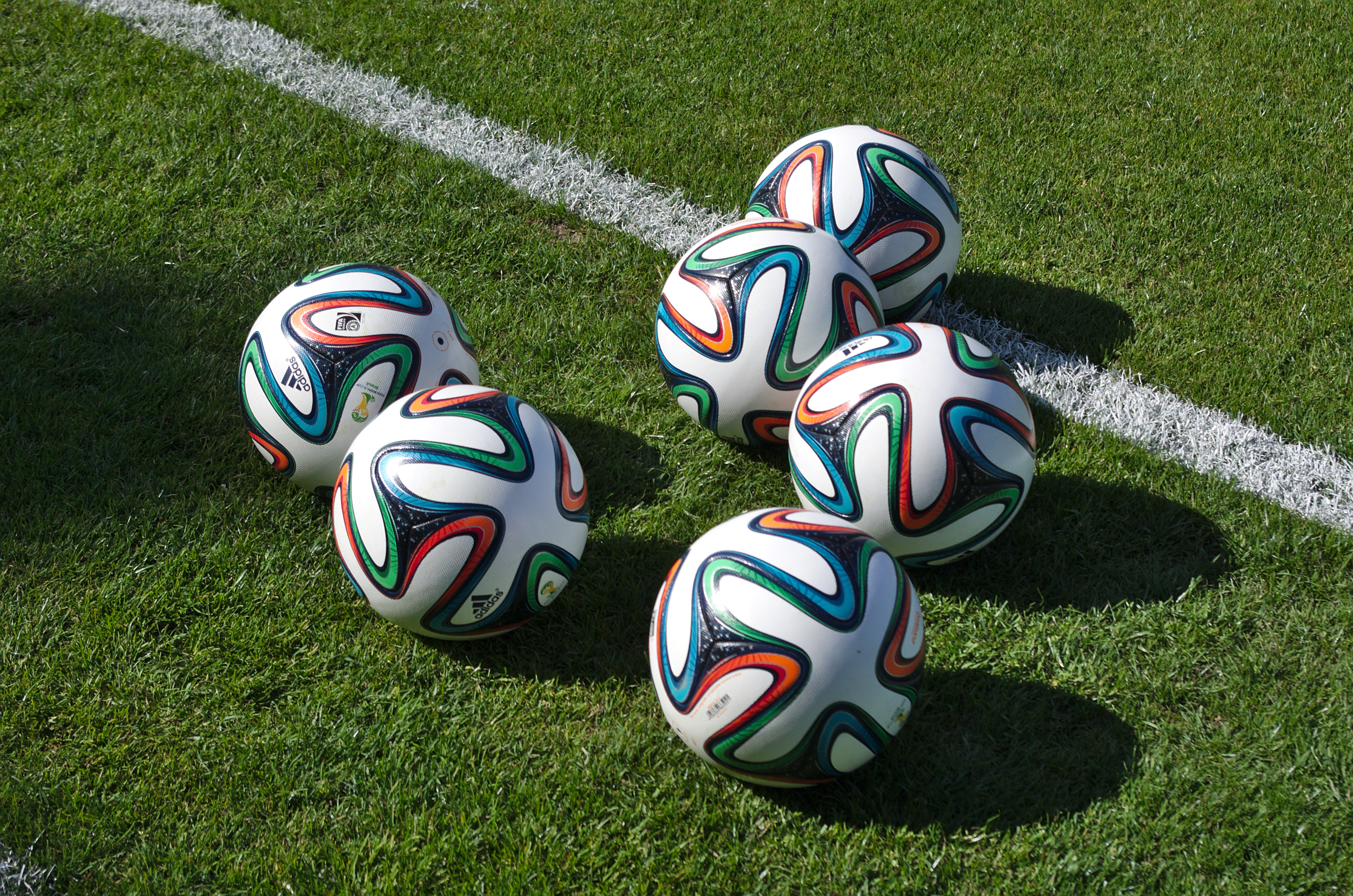
Several Brazuca balls, at the friendly between Algeria and Armenia in 2014

The original Brazuca balls for the World Cup finals were contract manufactured in Pakistan by Forward Sports, however bona fide replica balls are made in both China and Pakistan.

Taipei-based Long Way Enterprise were originally asked to manufacture the ball in their subsidiary YaYork Plastic Products in Shenzhen, Guangdong province, China. The company has been associated with production of Adidas balls since 1997.

Long Way, however, was unable to meet the high demand for the ball. A second supplier, Forward Sports (based in Sialkot, Pakistan), was brought in to help manufacture the ball. Forward Sports, who have been associated with Adidas since 1995 and already supplied footballs for both the UEFA Champions League and the German Bundesliga, were awarded the contract by Adidas at short notice after the original manufacturer in China failed to meet the demand. Over 42 million Brazuca balls were exported from Sialkot. Each ball is expected to be sold for around US$160.

== Unveiling ==
Adidas unveiled the Brazuca at a launch event on 3 December 2013, two days ahead of the traditional unveiling of the World Cup match ball at the draw of the group stages of the World Cup Final. The launch event took place in Rio de Janeiro at Parque Lage and featured a 3D light projection, which revealed the Brazuca to everyone in attendance.

On 7 December 2013, Major League Soccer announced a FIFA-approved version of the Brazuca as the official match ball for the league's 2014 season.

== Usage of the same or similar ball around the world ==
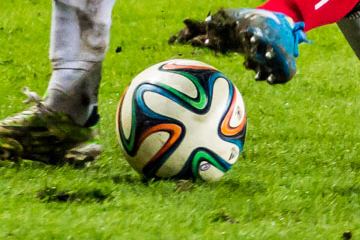
The Brazuca being used in the Ekstraklasa in 2015

The following competition used Brazuca ball which was also used in the World Cup, unless named different.

=== AFC ===
- South Korea: 2014 K League Classic
- Japan: 2014 J.League Division 1

=== UEFA ===
- Europe: 2014–15 UEFA Europa League (Adidas Europa League 2014/15)
- France: 2014–15 Ligue 1 (Adidas Pro Ligue 1 2014)
- Germany: 2014–15 Bundesliga (Adidas Torfabrik 2014)
- Poland: 2014–15 Ekstraklasa
- Portugal: 2014–15 Primeira Liga
- Spain: 2013–14 Copa del Rey

=== CONMEBOL ===
- Argentina: 2013–14 Argentine Primera División (Torneo Final) and 2014 Argentine Primera División (Adidas Argentum)

=== CONCACAF ===
- United States: 2014 Major League Soccer (Adidas Prime 3)

=== Scottish Premiership ===
- Scotland: 2013–14 Scottish Championship ("Adidas Unknown Orange")

== See also ==
- List of FIFA World Cup official match balls

Preceded by Jabulani	FIFA World Cup official ball 2014	Succeeded by Telstar 18
