= Adidas Tango =

Family and brand of association football balls

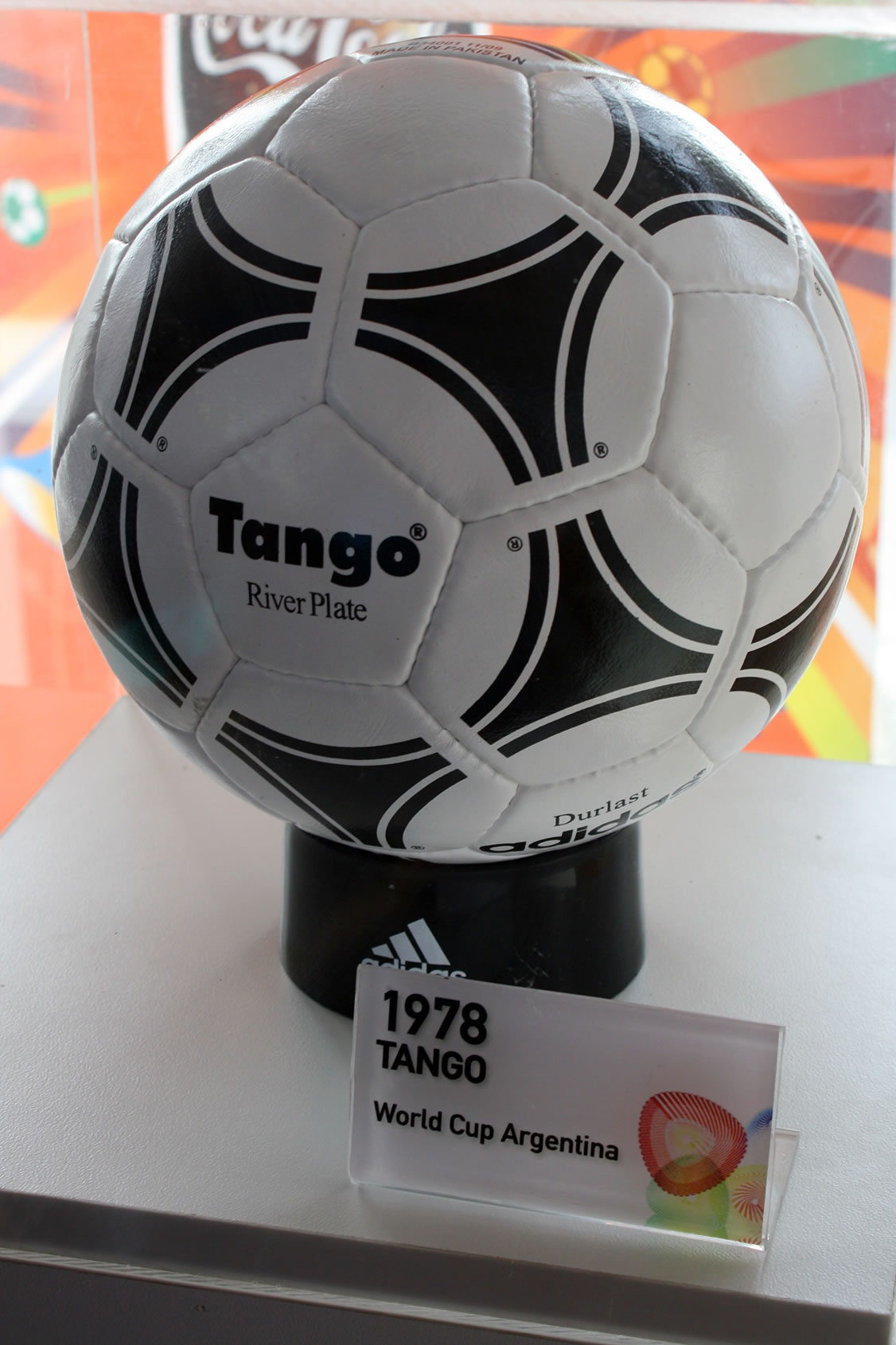
- Adidas Tango 'River Plate' used in the 1978 World Cup
- Type: Association football
- Inventor: Adidas
- Inception: 1978; 48 years ago
- Manufacturer: Adidas

The Adidas Tango is a family and brand of association football balls originally introduced as the "Tango Durlast" in 1978, specifically for the 1978 FIFA World Cup in Argentina. Variations of the design had been produced for various competitions including the FIFA World Cup, the UEFA European Championship, the South American Football Championship, and the football competition of the Summer Olympics. The Tango balls have had different names applied to them to distinguish them in their construction, the competitions they have been used for, and even if they are official match balls or replica balls.

In 2011, Adidas introduced the new Tango 12 ball, but aside from the name and the painted on design there are no particular similarities between the new ball and the old Adidas Tango family.

== Tango Durlast ==
The 1978 Tango Durlast consisted of twenty identical hexagonal panels with 'triads' creating the impression of 12 circles around the pentagons. The Adidas Tango Durlast ball was made of genuine leather with a shiny waterproof plastic coating.

== Tango España ==
The Tango España by Adidas was the official match ball of 1982 FIFA World Cup held in Spain. The Tango España had improved water resistant qualities through its rubberized seams. These proved to be not very durable and resulted in the ball having to be changed several times during some games. This ball was the last genuine leather ball to be used in the World Cup.

== Tango variations ==
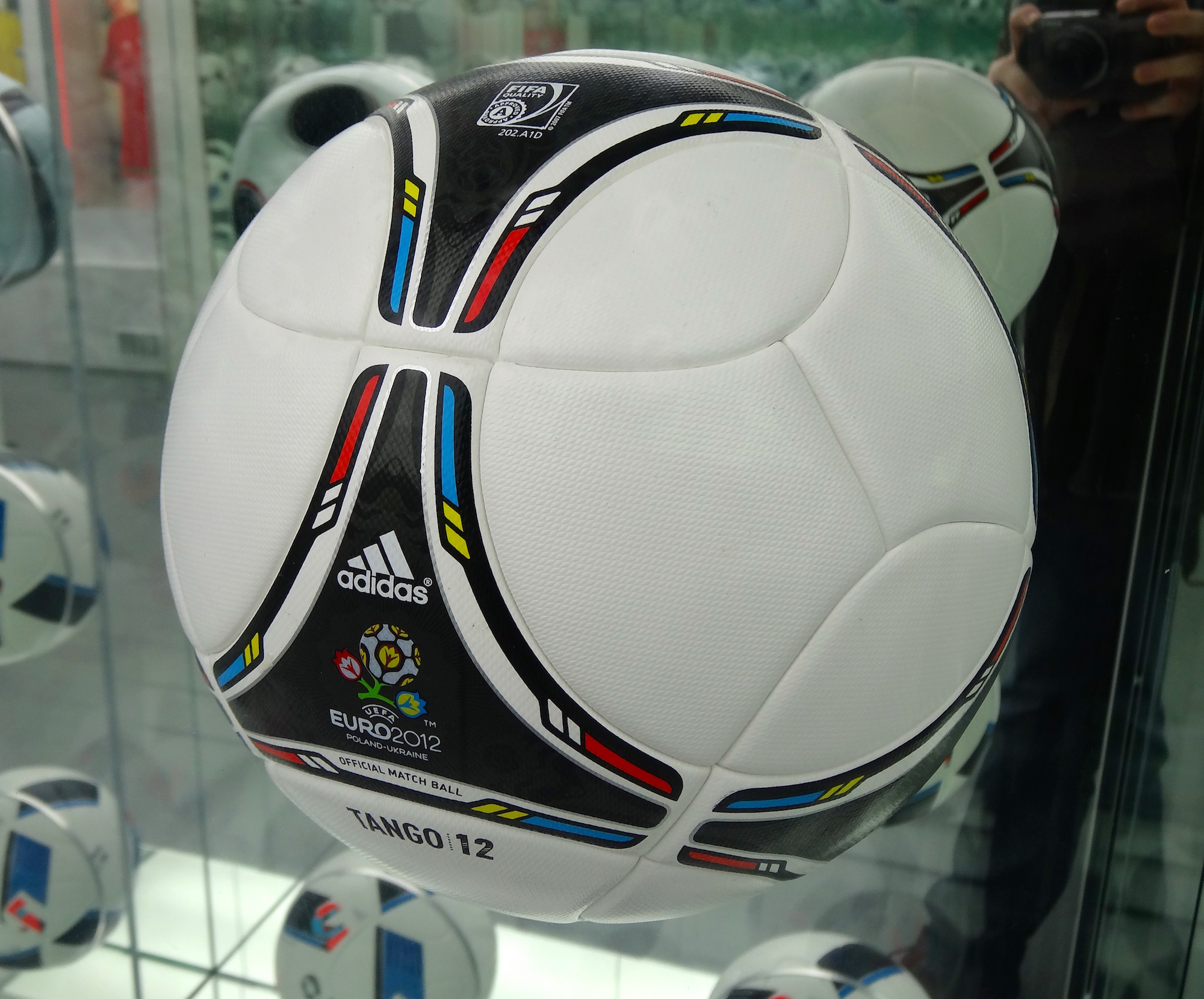
Tango 12, used in the UEFA Euro 2012

Year	Tango variation	Competition	Additional information
1978	Adidas Tango Durlast	1978 FIFA World Cup	The ball was initially introduced as the Tango Durlast, however further production models were also branded as Tango River Plate. Replica variations include the Tango Rosario
1980	Adidas Tango River Plate	UEFA Euro 1980	
1982	Adidas Tango España	1982 FIFA World Cup	Replica variations include the Tango Barcelona. Other variations include the Tango Mundial, Tango Alicante, Tango Malaga and Tango Indoor
1984	Adidas Tango Mundial	UEFA Euro 1984	
1984	Adidas Tango Sevilla	1984 Summer Olympics	Used for the 1984 Summer Olympic Games in Los Angeles — compared to previous Tango the only addition is the competition logo
1988	Adidas Tango Europa	UEFA Euro 1988	
1988	Adidas Tango Séoul	1988 Summer Olympics	
2012	Adidas Tango 12	UEFA Euro 2012	New design Adidas Tango, including Adidas Tango Argentina 12, Torfabrik, Comoequa, The Albert, Prime and Adidas Tango 12

Other variations of the Tango ball seen include: Tango Roma, Tango Napoli, Tango Munich, Tango Scorpion, Tango Mendoza, Tango Gol, Tango Indoor Ball, Tango Tournoi, and Tango Glider.

== Use in heraldry ==
Adidas Tango ball is featured on the club badge of Ukrainian club Chornomorets Odesa, as well as Russian football team Mordovia Saransk.

== See also ==
- Adidas Tango 12
- List of FIFA World Cup official match balls

Preceded by Telstar Durlast	FIFA World Cup official ball 1978–1982	Succeeded by Azteca
Preceded by Telstar Durlast	UEFA European Championship official ball 1980, 1984, 1988	Succeeded by Etrusco Unico
