= Adidas Finale =

Football brand by Adidas

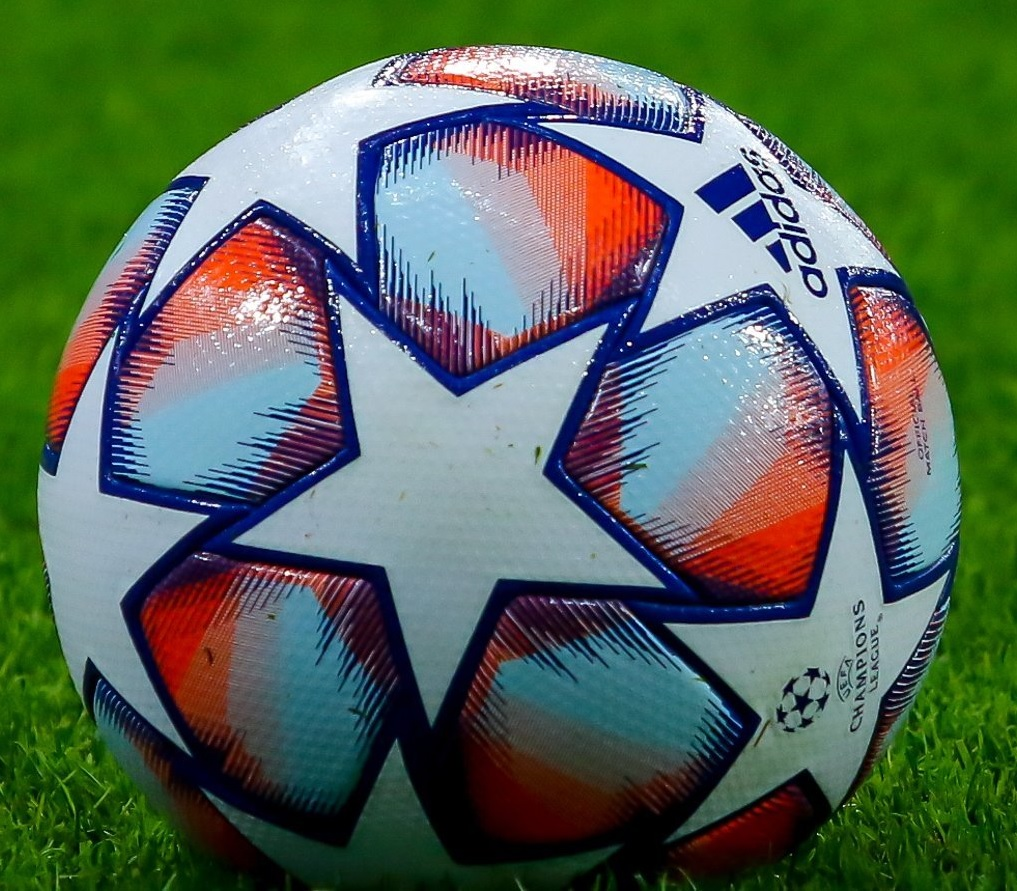
- Adidas Finale used in the 2020–21 UEFA Champions League group stage and the play-off round as well as Women's Champions League group stage. The knockout stage and the final have their own designs.
- Type: Football
- Inception: 2000; 26 years ago
- Manufacturer: Adidas
- Available: Yes

The Adidas Finale is a brand of football made by Adidas. It is the current official football of the men's and women's UEFA Champions Leagues; after Adidas took over the contract of official supplier from Nike in 2000. The internal and external design of the ball changes reflecting improvements to football technologies taken from other Adidas-produced footballs. The external design is the "Starball" based on the stars of the UEFA Champions League and Women's Champions League logo. Each year's ball keeps the branding name of Adidas Finale, excepting suffixes to designate the year.

== Usage ==
During its introduction the Adidas Finale was only used in the latter stages of Champions League competition; it was not uncommon to see other balls in the early rounds, usually provided by the kit manufacturer or the ball supplier for the domestic league of the home team, including other Adidas balls. However, from 2006–07, the Adidas Finale had been used in all stages of the competition, including the play-off round which was introduced in 2009–10 followed with the group stages. The balls can also be seen in other UEFA competitions. These balls are also occasionally used in the UEFA Women's Champions League with similar graphics. During the start of 2024–27 cycle, the Adidas Finale is now used for competition proper such as play-off rounds and league phase.

== Construction ==
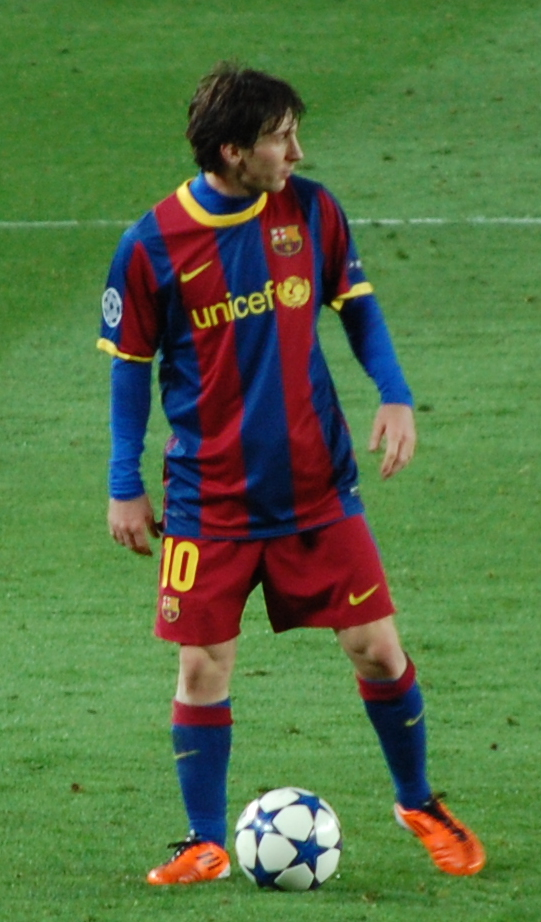
Lionel Messi of FC Barcelona in action with the Adidas Finale in the 2010–11 UEFA Champions League

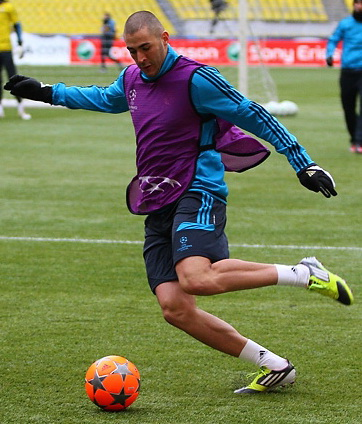
Karim Benzema of Real Madrid training with a high-visibility variant of the Finale in February 2012

The ball is made by Adidas as the German brand took over the contract from Nike in 2000, and was first developed based on the Adidas Terrestra Silverstream, the official match ball of the UEFA Euro 2000 in the Netherlands and Belgium. This ball was also made with the same type of materials and construction used for the Adidas Fevernova, except, of course, the graphics.

The Finale ball incorporates a unique design that was inspired by the UEFA Champions League "starball" logo. The Finale is softer, faster, and more accurate than any other Adidas football before and it also features a layer of highly compressed, gas-filled micro-balloons of equal size (syntactic foam), proven during Euro 2000 and probably contributing to one of the highest average goal rates in a major tournament.

Until the final of the 2005–06 season, the Finale used the traditional truncated icosahedron panel design for their balls. From then on the panels are the same as the Adidas Teamgeist ball. From 2004–05, the ball structure was the same as the Adidas Roteiro balls used for UEFA Euro 2004, which had thermally bonded panels.

Since the 2010 final, the panels took the shape of the competition's starball logo. The panels design has been revised in 2019, previously connected on the edges, the panels now overlap to improve durability.

== Design ==
Each season in the Champions League, the colour of the stars on the ball is changed. The first ball, in 2000–01 was silver, followed by black in 2001–02, then dark blue in 2003–04, and red in 2004–05. This was followed by light blue in 2005–06. The design for next season's ball was used in this season's final. A light blue ball was used for most of the 2005–06 season, but in the final between Arsenal and FC Barcelona, held in the Stade de France, Saint-Denis it was replaced by a ball with the same paneling as the Adidas +Teamgeist but decorated with pink stars. For the 2006–07 season, the ball had grey stars trimmed in red and white and the Finale Athens ball is a chrome silver metallic with royal blue and white. For the 2007–08 season, the ball was decorated in tangerine orange and black stars with grey trim. For the final of the 2007–08 season in Moscow, the ball was gray and red stars with a gold trim, while the ball's paneling was still same with +Teamgeist, but with PSC-Texture which based on Adidas Europass. The match ball used for the 2008–09 season was black and white with a green trim. For 2009–10, the starball's based panels was being used.

=== Champions League final variants ===
Each match ball intended for use in the final is marked with the location at which the final match is to be played. For example, the 2004–05 Champions League final was held in Istanbul, Turkey and as such, the blue/silver-starred Finale balls were marked with Istanbul.

From 2006–07 to 2010–11, the Champions League holder played with the match ball used in the previous final in their home games. Since 2011–12, the final ball has been used from the round of 16, with the title holders using the regular ball in their home group stage games.

== Collectors' items ==
These balls have a star-panel design that has been created specifically for the UEFA Champions League. These match balls have been developed using FIFA’s quality standards and have been awarded the FIFA Quality Pro seal.

== List of balls ==
Season	Ball name	Ball family	Starball design	Final venue	Final design variation	Notes
2000–01	Adidas Finale	Adidas Terrestra Silverstream	Grey stars	San Siro, Milan		First used in 2000–01 Champions League semi-finals
2001–02	Adidas Finale	Adidas Terrestra Silverstream	Grey stars	Hampden Park, Glasgow		Same ball as used for 2000–01 season
2002–03	Adidas Finale 2003	Adidas Terrestra Silverstream / Fevernova	Black stars	Old Trafford, Manchester		Same design and materials as 2000–01 season with black stars instead of grey
2003–04	Adidas Finale 2003/2004	Adidas Terrestra Silverstream / Fevernova	Blue stars	Arena AufSchalke, Gelsenkirchen	With the Arena AufSchalke logo	Same design and materials as 2000–01 season with blue stars instead of grey
2004–05	Adidas Finale	Adidas Roteiro	Red stars	Atatürk Olympic Stadium, Istanbul	Blue/silver stars with Istanbul logo with the final contestants' name, Milan and Liverpool on the ball	Adidas has recorded this as the fourth generation Finale
2005–06	Adidas Finale	Adidas Teamgeist	Blue/grey	Stade de France, Saint-Denis	Red/blue/white starball	Final ball is the same construction as the 2006 World Cup Teamgeist ball
2006–07	Adidas Finale	Adidas Teamgeist	Black/red	Olympic Stadium, Athens	Adidas Finale Athens – Blue/White starball	An orange variation exists for snow conditions, but used for title holders only while the qualified teams in the play-off round and the group stage use the regular ball.
2007–08	Adidas Finale	Adidas Teamgeist	Orange	Luzhniki Stadium, Moscow	Red/gold	
2008–09	Adidas Finale 8	Adidas Teamgeist II / Europass / Terrapass	Indigo/indigo metallic/rave green	Stadio Olimpico, Rome	Adidas Finale Rome – Burgundy/gold with mosaic figures representing key sporting and Roman values such as speed, teamwork, justice and power are featured in each star honouring the most important European club game.	
2009–10	Adidas Finale 9	Adidas Teamgeist	Red/black	Santiago Bernabéu Stadium, Madrid	Adidas Finale Madrid – Red/gold	Final ball design takes shape of the Champions League starball logo
2010–11	Adidas Finale 10		Blue	Wembley Stadium, London	Adidas Finale Wembley/red	
2011–12	Adidas Finale 11			Allianz Arena, Munich	Adidas Finale Munich – Blue/aqua/Yellow	The final ball is used for the knockout stage and the final only as all qualified teams in both play-off round and the group stage now use the regular Finale balls.
2012–13	Adidas Finale 12			Wembley Stadium, London	Adidas Finale Wembley – marked Final Wembley 2013, with the years of previous finals held in Wembley marked on the ball to commemorate the 50th anniversary of the final.	
2013–14	Adidas Finale 13		White / infrared / silver / black	Estádio da Luz, Lisbon	Altered colours, marked final Lisbon 2014	
2014–15	Adidas Finale 14		White / solar red / solar orange	Olympiastadion, Berlin	Adidas Final Berlin – Differently-coloured graffiti representing the various landmarks of Berlin inside the stars. The UEFA Champions League, Adidas and Final Berlin 2015 logos are visible on the ball, coloured in black.	
2015–16	Adidas Finale 15		Blue / white / orange / pink / lime green / yellow	San Siro, Milan	Adidas Finale Milano – Same as the regular ball, but with grey-coloured stars. Also, a pink Final Milan 2016 logo is visible.	
2016–17	Adidas Finale 16		Dark blue / gold / white / red	Millennium Stadium, Cardiff	Adidas Finale Cardiff – Unlike the previous balls, the ball features the dragon that represents the host country's identity.	
2017–18	Adidas Finale 17		Blue / yellow / white / silver	Olimpiyskiy National Sports Complex, Kyiv	Adidas Finale Kyiv – The match ball itself represents the colours of the host's country, Ukraine where the capital hosts the final.	
2018–19	Adidas Finale 18		Blue / yellow / white	Wanda Metropolitano, Madrid	Adidas Finale Madrid 19 – Different from the 2010 ball, the ball's colours represent the flags of the host's country, Spain.	
2019–20	Adidas Finale 19		Green / blue / yellow / orange / dark blue / white	Atatürk Olympic Stadium, Istanbul	Adidas Finale Istanbul – The ball features the design of the Istanbul's map which is divided by the Bosporus.	Overlapped panel design.
2020–21	Adidas Finale 20		Light blue / orange / dark blue / white	Atatürk Olympic Stadium, Istanbul	Adidas Finale Istanbul – The ball features 20 previous designs from 20 finals to celebrate the 20th anniversary of the first Adidas Finale ball introduced in 2001.	Overlapped panel design.
2021-22 (UEFA Champions League); 2021-22 (UEFA Women's Champions League)	Adidas Finale 21		White / Solar red / yellow / orange	Stade de France, Saint-Denis (UEFA Champions League); Juventus Stadium, Turin (UEFA Women's Champions League)	Adidas Finale Paris (UEFA Champions League) - The ball features the word, peace in English and Ukrainian. Adidas Finale Turin (UEFA Women's Champions League) – The ball features the mountains surrounding in the north of Turin where the Alps are located in the background.	Overlapped panel design.
2022–23 (UEFA Champions League); 2022-23 (UEFA Women's Champions League)	Adidas Finale 22		Green / black / purple / orange / light green / white (UEFA Champions League); Orange / black / blue / white / grey (UEFA Women's Champions League)	Atatürk Olympic Stadium, Istanbul (UEFA Champions League); Philips Stadion, Eindhoven (UEFA Women's Champions League)	Adidas Finale Istanbul 23 (UEFA Champions League) – The ball features the pattern inspired by traditional Turkish art and covering most of the upper. The gold symbolises Istanbul's rich history while the silver is reminiscent of the Champions League trophy. The white stars with a touch of orange around the edges are iconic, with the logos in them reflecting the color of the football itself. Adidas Finale Eindhoven (UEFA Women's Champions League) – The Women's Champions League final ball 2023 features a striking design that combines white and black panels with colourful graphics. The graphics adorning the Women's Champions League final 2023 ball are inspired by Eindhoven, the host city and also known as the City of Light.	Overlapped panel design
2023–24 (UEFA Champions League); 2023-24 (UEFA Women's Champions League)	Adidas Finale 23		Blue / pink / white (UEFA Champions League); Pink / white (UEFA Women's Champions League)	Wembley Stadium, London (UEFA Champions League); San Mamés, Bilbao (UEFA Women's Champions League)	Adidas Finale London (UEFA Champions League) – The eye-catching design celebrates the final host city, London, with vibrant graphics featuring two roaring lions fighting among the stars. The lion is symbolic of the rich history and culture of the UK and its capital city, and also represents the bravery and strength of the players and the majesty of European club football's most coveted trophy. Adidas Finale Bilbao (UEFA Women's Champions League) – The design draws inspiration from the disruptive urban geometries of the host city, incorporating iconic shapes from Bilbao's architecture and motifs from the San Mames stadium into the traditional star pattern.	Overlapped panel design.
2024–25 (UEFA Champions League); 2024-25 (UEFA Women's Champions League)	Adidas Finale 24		Black / lime / white (UEFA Champions League); Pink / black / white (UEFA Women's Champions League)	Allianz Arena, Munich (UEFA Champions League); Estádio José Alvalade, Lisbon (UEFA Women's Champions League)	The league phase uses regular balls much like now-defunct group stage, while the knockout stage and final remain the same. Adidas Finale Munich 25 (UEFA Champions League) – This palette is inspired by the final’s host city Munich’s rooftops and landmarks, as well as the gateway to the Bavarian Alps. Further embedding the region’s identity, intricate details within the panels highlight symbols of Bavaria, including the Palatine lion, edelweiss, the Waldlerhaus, the Englischer Garten, and hops. Adidas Finale Lisbon (UEFA Women's Champions League) – Draped in a striking white and blue base, accented with vibrant orange and yellow, the design takes inspiration from Portugal’s capital. The intricate star panel detailing is a nod to Lisbon’s famed “azulejos” – the iconic porcelain tiles that adorn its historic buildings.	
