= 2008 UEFA Champions League final =

Football match in Moscow, Russia

- Match programme cover
- Event: 2007–08 UEFA Champions League
Manchester United	Chelsea
(England)	(England)
1	1
- After extra time Manchester United won 6–5 on penalties
- Date: 21 May 2008
- Venue: Luzhniki Stadium, Moscow
- UEFA Man of the Match: Edwin van der Sar (Manchester United)
- Fans' Man of the Match: Cristiano Ronaldo (Manchester United)
- Referee: Ľuboš Micheľ (Slovakia)
- Attendance: 67,310
- Weather: Cloudy; 14 °C (57 °F); 96% humidity

The 2008 UEFA Champions League final was a football match that took place on 21 May 2008 at the Luzhniki Stadium in Moscow, Russia, to determine the winner of the 2007–08 UEFA Champions League. It was contested by Manchester United and Chelsea, making it an all-English final for the first time in the history of the competition; it was only the third time that two clubs from the same country had contested the final, after 2000 and 2003. It was the first European Cup final played in Russia, and hence the easternmost final in the tournament's history. It also marked the 100th anniversary of Manchester United's first league triumph, the 50th anniversary of the Munich air disaster, and the 40th anniversary of United's first European Cup triumph in 1968. It was Manchester United's third European Cup final after 1968 and 1999, while it was Chelsea's first.

Manchester United won the match 6–5 on penalties, following a 1–1 draw after extra time. Cristiano Ronaldo opened the scoring for Manchester United in the 26th minute with a header from a cross by Wes Brown, but Frank Lampard equalised shortly before half-time. The second half and most of extra time passed without incident until Chelsea's Didier Drogba was sent off for slapping Nemanja Vidić four minutes from the end. In the penalty shoot-out, Ronaldo missed Manchester United's third kick, giving John Terry the chance to win the title for Chelsea, only for his shot to hit the post when he slipped as he was about to kick the ball. Edwin van der Sar then saved Nicolas Anelka's effort from Chelsea's seventh kick to secure Manchester United's third European Cup title.

More than 67,000 people watched the game in the stadium, along with more than 17.5 million television viewers in the United Kingdom and Ireland. In addition to prize money received from earlier in the competition, Manchester United received €7 million for winning the final, while Chelsea received €4 million. As winners, Manchester United went on to play in the 2008 UEFA Super Cup, losing 2–1 to 2007–08 UEFA Cup winners Zenit Saint Petersburg, and the 2008 FIFA Club World Cup, which they won after beating 2008 Copa Libertadores winners LDU Quito 1–0 in the final.

== Background ==
Manchester United and Chelsea had played each other 150 times prior to the Champions League final, including 18 meetings in domestic cup competitions (the FA Cup, the Football League Cup and the FA Community Shield). Due to various historical restrictions regarding the number of teams from the same country entering European competitions, they had never met in Europe before. Manchester United held the upper hand in the teams' previous meetings, winning 65 times to Chelsea's 41, with 44 draws. Their cup record was equally good, winning 10 of their 18 meetings, with 4 draws and 4 Chelsea wins. However, honours were even in cup finals, with Manchester United having won the 1994 FA Cup final 4–0, while Chelsea won the 2007 FA Cup final 1–0, the last cup game between the two sides. Manchester United responded to defeat in the 2007 FA Cup Final by beating Chelsea in the 2007 FA Community Shield the following August, winning 3–0 on penalties after a 1–1 draw in normal time. They went on to claim their 17th league title at the end of the 2007–08 Premier League season, finishing two points ahead of Chelsea. Both teams went into the final game of the season level on points, but United were ahead of Chelsea because of their superior goal difference, meaning United's 2–0 win against Wigan Athletic on the final day made Chelsea's late draw with Bolton Wanderers irrelevant. In the two sides' league meetings that season, United won 2–0 at Old Trafford in Avram Grant's first game in charge of Chelsea on 23 September 2007, while Chelsea won 2–1 at Stamford Bridge in the return game on 26 April 2008.

Because of the aforementioned restrictions on entry to UEFA competitions, Manchester United had only met English opposition in Europe twice before, (Note: Manchester United's first meeting against English opposition in Europe was in the second round of the 1963–64 European Cup Winners' Cup, when they played against defending champions Tottenham Hotspur over two legs in December 1963; Tottenham won the first leg at White Hart Lane 2–0, but Manchester United won the second leg at Old Trafford 4–1 to qualify for the third round. The second meeting was against Everton in the third round of the non-UEFA 1964–65 Inter-Cities Fairs Cup; Everton held Manchester United to a draw in the first leg at Old Trafford in January 1965, before United won the return leg 2–1 at Goodison Park three weeks later.) while Chelsea had far more experience against English opposition, having played 12 matches against compatriot clubs, winning five, drawing five and losing just two. (Note: In addition to their 4–3 aggregate win over Liverpool in the semi-final, Chelsea's first all-English European tie came in the semi-finals of the 1970–71 European Cup Winners' Cup against defending champions Manchester City, in which they won 1–0 in both legs of the tie. In 2003–04, they met Arsenal in the quarter-finals of the Champions League, drawing 1–1 at home, then winning 2–1 away. They were then drawn against Liverpool in the semi-finals of both the 2004–05 and 2006–07 competitions, losing 1–0 on aggregate in 2005 and 4–1 on penalties after a 1–1 aggregate draw in 2007. Chelsea also met Liverpool in the 2005–06 Champions League group stage (Liverpool, who were defending champions, were not given association protection due to the unique nature of the way they qualified for the competition, having come through the qualifying rounds), both games finished 0–0.) There had been two previous Champions League finals between teams from the same country: in 2000, when Real Madrid beat fellow Spanish side Valencia 3–0 at the Stade de France; and in 2003, when Italian sides Milan and Juventus played out a 0–0 draw at Old Trafford before Milan won 3–2 on penalties.

Both sides had a connection to the early history of European football; Chelsea were invited to take part in the inaugural European Cup in 1955–56 as champions of England, only to be denied entry by The Football League, allowing Manchester United to become the first English entrants in the competition the following season. In February 1958, eight Manchester United players were killed in the Munich air disaster, when the aeroplane carrying their team back from a match in Belgrade crashed while attempting to take off from a refuelling stop in Munich. Manager Matt Busby was seriously injured in the crash and almost died as a result, but he rebuilt the team, and in May 1968, Manchester United became the first English winners of the European Cup, beating Benfica 4–1 in the 1968 European Cup final. Chelsea won their first European trophy three years later, when they beat Real Madrid 2–1 in the 1971 European Cup Winners' Cup final replay after a 1–1 draw in the first match. Both Chelsea and Manchester United won that same competition during the 1990s – first Manchester United beat Barcelona 2–1 in the 1991 final (followed by victory over Red Star Belgrade in the 1991 Super Cup), and then Chelsea beat VfB Stuttgart in the 1998 final (followed by victory over Real Madrid in the 1998 Super Cup, their most recent European success at the time). Manchester United then won their second European Cup the following year, beating Bayern Munich in the 1999 Champions League final.

== Venue ==
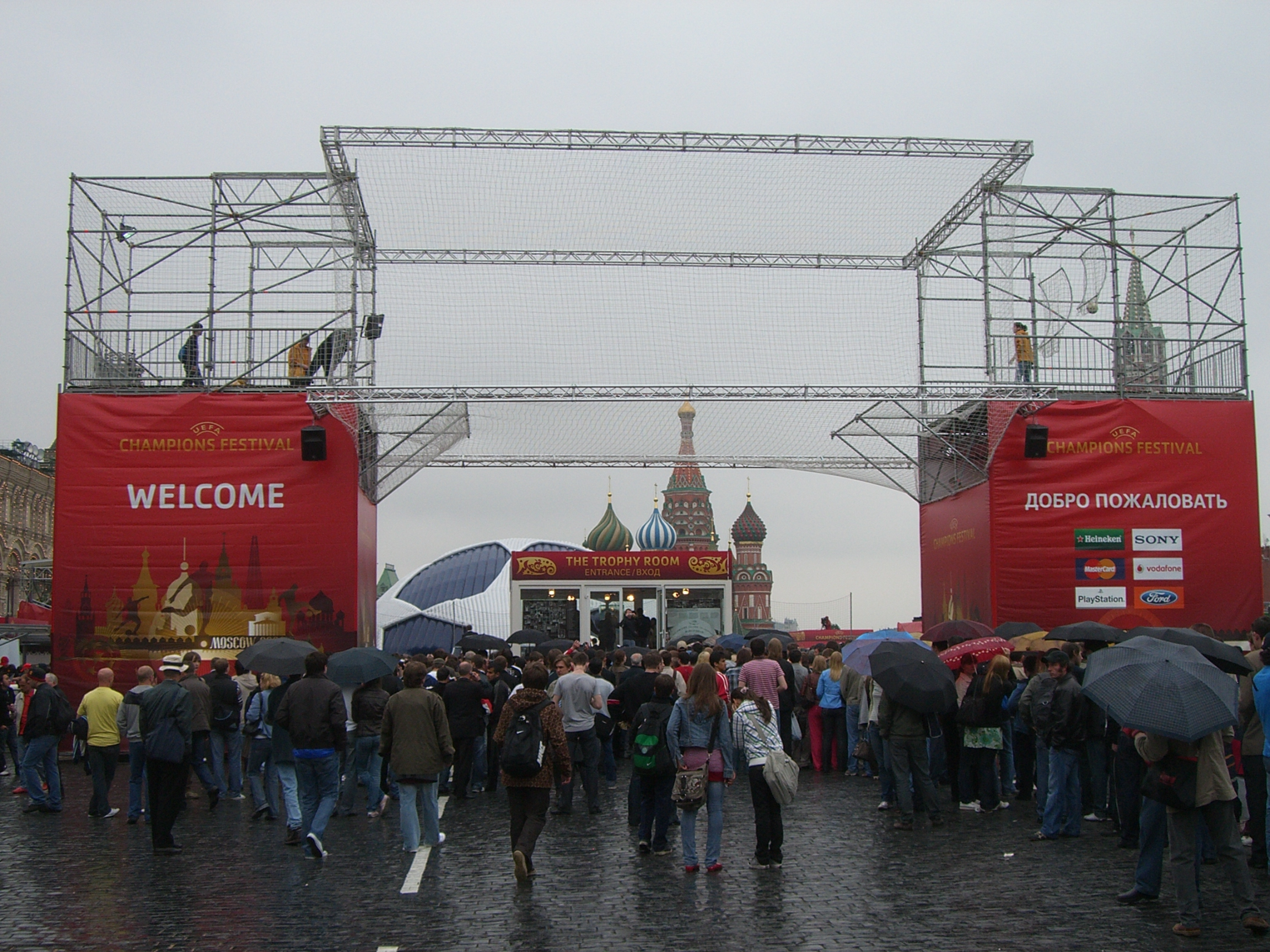
The entrance to the UEFA Champions Festival in Red Square, Moscow

The Luzhniki Stadium in Moscow was selected as the venue for the match at a meeting of the UEFA Executive Committee in Ljubljana, Slovenia, on 4 October 2006. The committee – who decided the venue for the 2009 final and the 2008 and 2009 UEFA Cup finals at the same meeting – based their decision on a number of factors, including stadium capacity, safety and security facilities, and accessibility. The other venues in contention were the Estadio Olímpico in Seville, the Olympiastadion in Berlin, Wembley Stadium in London, and the Stadio Olimpico in Rome, which was chosen to host the 2009 final.

This was the easternmost final in the history of the European Cup/UEFA Champions League. It was the first time the competition's showpiece match had been played in Russia, although the Luzhniki Stadium had previously played host to the 1999 UEFA Cup final, in which Italian club Parma beat French side Marseille 3–0. Because of the difference in time zones, the match kicked off at 22:45 Moscow Time, making it the first Champions League final to start on one day and finish in the next.

Originally known as the Grand Arena of the Central Lenin Stadium, the venue opened in 1956 as a new national stadium for the Soviet Union national football team. In 1973, it served as the principal venue for the seventh Summer Universiade, before going on to perform the same function at the 1980 Summer Olympics. By this point, the stadium's capacity was 103,000; however, renovations in the mid-1990s reduced the capacity to just under 85,000. The stadium was given five-star status by UEFA in 1998, before hosting the UEFA Cup final the following year. To help the stadium cope with cold Russian winters, the grass pitch was replaced by an artificial FieldTurf surface in 2002. Although UEFA allowed matches in earlier rounds and European Championship qualifying to be played on the synthetic surface, they mandated that the Champions League final should be played on natural grass. The FieldTurf was removed after Russia's UEFA Euro 2008 qualifying match against England on 17 October, but the first grass pitch laid was deemed to be too bumpy. Another pitch was laid less than three weeks before the final at a cost of £160,000, using turf shipped in from Slovakia, but groundsman Matt Frost said, "I'm totally disappointed with the whole project and what we are presenting for the final." UEFA's director of communications, William Gaillard, said the pitch might not look as good as they had hoped to television audiences, but was confident that it would be fine to play on.

== Route to the final ==
(England) Manchester United				Round	(England) Chelsea			
Opponent	Result			Group stage	Opponent	Result		
(Portugal) Sporting CP	1–0 (A)			Matchday 1	(Norway) Rosenborg	1–1 (H)		
(Italy) Roma	1–0 (H)			Matchday 2	(Spain) Valencia	2–1 (A)		
(Ukraine) Dynamo Kyiv	4–2 (A)			Matchday 3	(Germany) Schalke 04	2–0 (H)		
(Ukraine) Dynamo Kyiv	4–0 (H)			Matchday 4	(Germany) Schalke 04	0–0 (A)		
(Portugal) Sporting CP	2–1 (H)			Matchday 5	(Norway) Rosenborg	4–0 (A)		
(Italy) Roma	1–1 (A)			Matchday 6	(Spain) Valencia	0–0 (H)		
Group F winner: Pos / Team / Pld / Pts; 1 / (England) Manchester United / 6 / 16; 2 / (Italy) Roma / 6 / 11; 3 / (Portugal) Sporting CP / 6 / 7; 4 / (Ukraine) Dynamo Kyiv / 6 / 0; Source: RSSSF				Final standings	Group B winner: Pos / Team / Pld / Pts; 1 / (England) Chelsea / 6 / 12; 2 / (Germany) Schalke 04 / 6 / 8; 3 / (Norway) Rosenborg / 6 / 7; 4 / (Spain) Valencia / 6 / 5; Source: RSSSF			
Opponent	Agg.	1st leg	2nd leg	Knockout stage	Opponent	Agg.	1st leg	2nd leg
(France) Lyon	2–1	1–1 (A)	1–0 (H)	First knockout round	(Greece) Olympiacos	3–0	0–0 (A)	3–0 (H)
(Italy) Roma	3–0	2–0 (A)	1–0 (H)	Quarter-finals	(Turkey) Fenerbahçe	3–2	1–2 (A)	2–0 (H)
(Spain) Barcelona	1–0	0–0 (A)	1–0 (H)	Semi-finals	(England) Liverpool	4–3	1–1 (A)	3–2 (a.e.t.) (H)

=== Manchester United ===
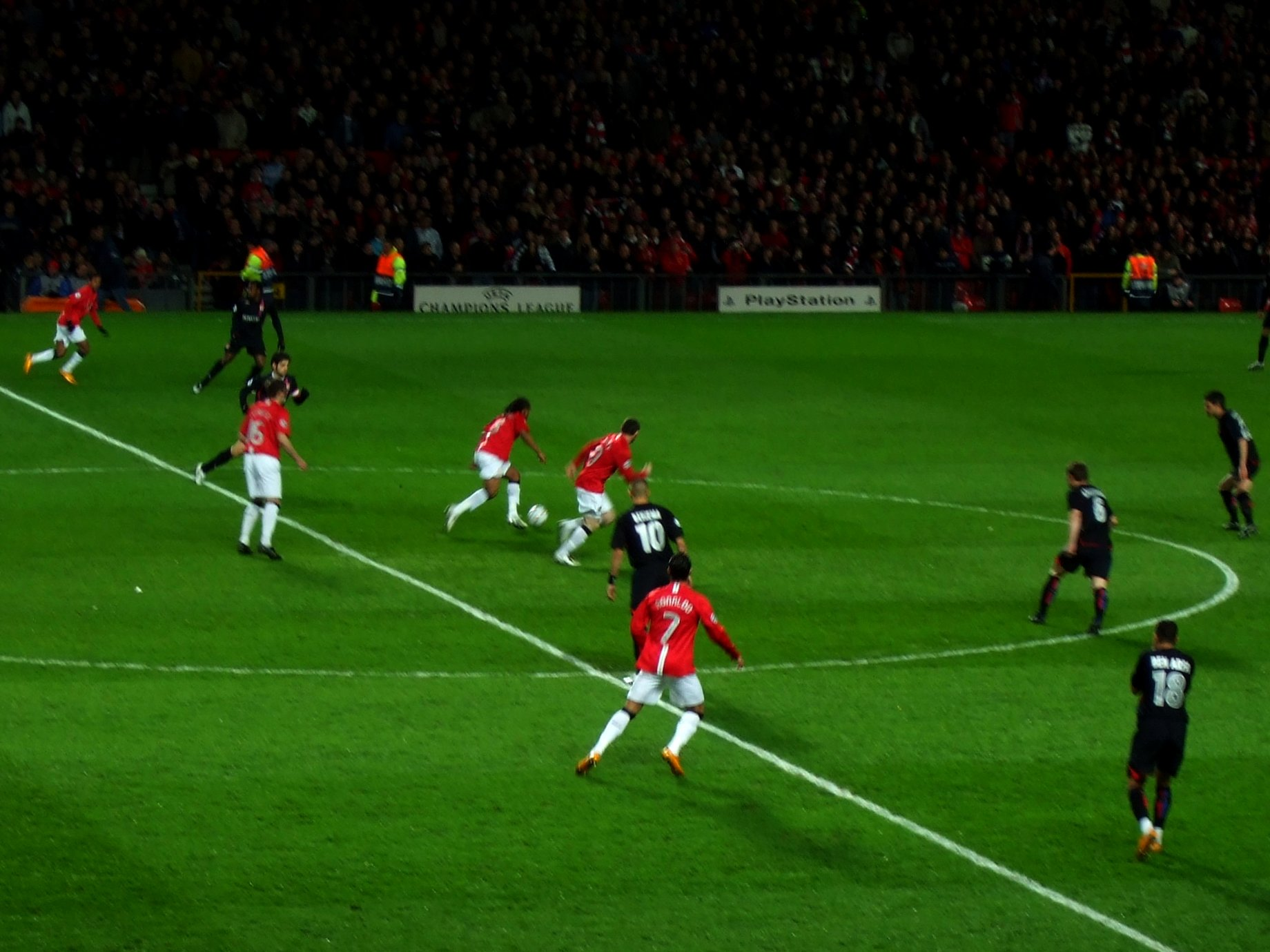
Manchester United beat Lyon 1–0 in the second leg of their first knockout round tie at Old Trafford.

Manchester United were drawn in Group F along with Roma, Sporting CP and Dynamo Kyiv. United won their first five group games; they first travelled to Lisbon, where Cristiano Ronaldo's header secured a 1–0 win against his old club, Sporting. Next was another 1–0 win at home to Roma, followed by back-to-back four-goal victories over Dynamo Kyiv (4–2 in Ukraine and 4–0 at Old Trafford). United secured top spot in the group with a 2–1 win at home to Sporting in their fifth game. They travelled to Roma for the final group game, in which both teams were already guaranteed to progress; it finished as a 1–1 draw, with Gerard Piqué scoring his second goal for the club before Mancini's equaliser. United finished with 16 points, the most of all the group winners.

In the first knockout round, United were drawn against Lyon. They drew the away leg 1–1, thanks to a late equaliser from Carlos Tevez, before winning the second leg 1–0 – Ronaldo scoring the only goal – to ensure a 2–1 aggregate victory and a place in the quarter-finals, where they were again drawn against Roma.

The quarter-final matches represented the fifth and sixth times these two clubs had met in Europe in just over 12 months; they had met at the same stage of the previous season's competition and then again in the group stage this season. United went to Rome and secured a 2–0 win with a first-half header from Ronaldo and a second-half goal tapped in by Wayne Rooney. United went on to secure the tie in the second leg with a 1–0 win, their record 11th consecutive home Champions League win.

The semi-final pitted United against Barcelona; the teams had not met since the group stage of the 1998–99 tournament, the last time United won it. The teams also had identical records going into the semi-final, each having won eight and drawn two of their 10 games, scoring 18 goals and conceding just five. The first leg at the Camp Nou saw United spend most of the game defending, while Barcelona tried to pass the ball around them. United were awarded a penalty in the first minute, but Ronaldo sent the ball wide, hitting the stanchion behind the goal. That was as close as either team got to a goal in the first leg and it ended 0–0. The second leg at Old Trafford was played at a higher tempo, and United won 1–0 thanks to a goal from Paul Scholes after 14 minutes. This result extended United's consecutive home win record in the Champions League to 12 and ensured that they reached the final unbeaten.

In reaching the final, United won nine and drew three of their 12 matches, dwarfing their record of four wins and six draws in the 10 games they took to reach the final in 1999 (when teams advanced from the group stage directly into the quarter-finals). United scored 19 goals en route to the final, Ronaldo scoring seven of them, more than any other player.

=== Chelsea ===
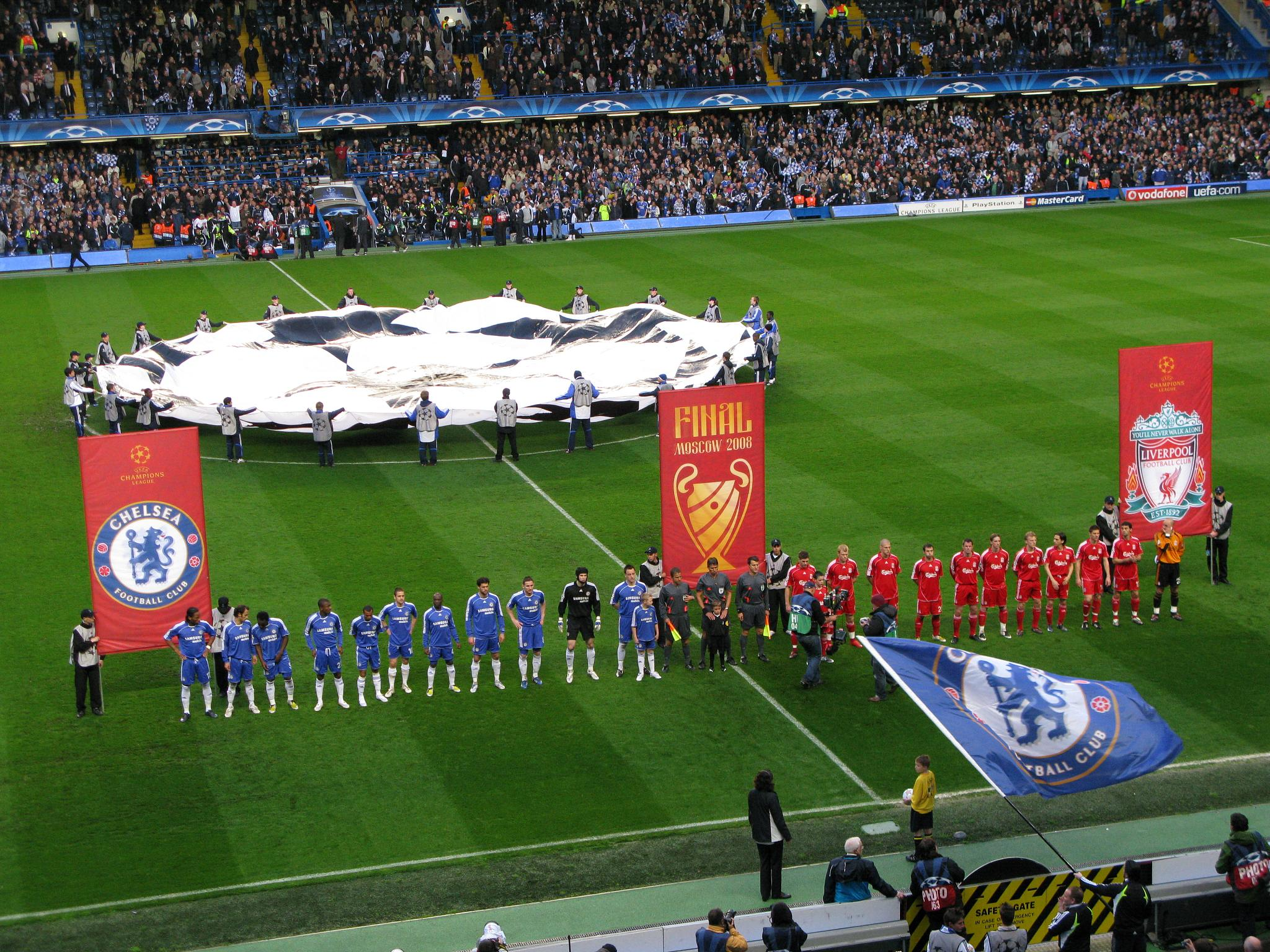
The Chelsea and Liverpool teams line up ahead of the second leg of their semi-final at Stamford Bridge. Chelsea won 3–2 after extra time (4–3 on aggregate) to qualify for the final.

In the group stage, Chelsea were drawn into Group B, along with Schalke 04 of Germany, Rosenborg of Norway and Spanish club Valencia. Chelsea's first match in the group was against Rosenborg at Stamford Bridge, where they were held to a 1–1 draw. Two days later, manager José Mourinho left Chelsea by mutual consent, and was replaced by their director of football, former Israel national team coach Avram Grant. Chelsea's second match was against Valencia, whom they beat 2–1, leaving Chelsea with four points from their two matches. They then faced Schalke in their next two matches; the first was played at Stamford Bridge, with Chelsea winning 2–0, while the return match in Gelsenkirchen ended in a 0–0 draw. Chelsea's final two matches in their group resulted in a 4–0 victory away to Rosenborg and a goalless draw at home to Valencia. Chelsea progressed as group winners with 12 points from six games.

Chelsea faced Greek side Olympiacos in the first knockout round. The first leg in Athens ended in a 0–0 draw, but a 3–0 win in the second leg, with goals from Michael Ballack, Frank Lampard and Salomon Kalou, saw Chelsea through to the quarter-finals. There, they were drawn against Fenerbahçe of Turkey. The first leg was held at the Şükrü Saracoğlu Stadium in Istanbul, and ended in a 2–1 defeat, as Deivid made up for an early own goal by scoring the winner nine minutes from time after Colin Kazim-Richards' equaliser. Chelsea won the second leg at Stamford Bridge 2–0, with goals from Ballack and Lampard, to claim a 3–2 aggregate victory over the Turkish side.

Chelsea faced fellow English club Liverpool in the semi-finals. This was the fourth year in succession that these teams had met in the Champions League, following semi-final meetings in 2004–05 and 2006–07, and two group stage matches in 2005–06. The first leg at Anfield was a 1–1 draw, in which Chelsea got a 95th-minute equaliser through a John Arne Riise own goal after Dirk Kuyt had put Liverpool 1–0 up just before half-time. Chelsea won the second leg 3–2 after extra time, with two goals from Didier Drogba and one from Lampard sending the Blues through to the first Champions League final in their history.

== Pre-match ==
=== Identity ===
As part of the marketing for each Champions League final since 1997, UEFA commissions a unique design concept inspired by the cultural and historical heritage of the host city. The 2008 final's design was announced on 31 October 2007 in a ceremony at the Luzhniki Stadium, attended by the ambassador for the final, former Russian goalkeeper Rinat Dasayev. The design was based on a colour scheme of deep red and gold, inspired by the predominant colours of Red Square, the Kremlin and the gold domes of Moscow's cathedrals, and featured images of the Moscow skyline, as well as the UEFA Champions League logo and trophy rendered in a Russian artistic style, with text in a font similar to Cyrillic script.

=== Ticketing and supporters ===
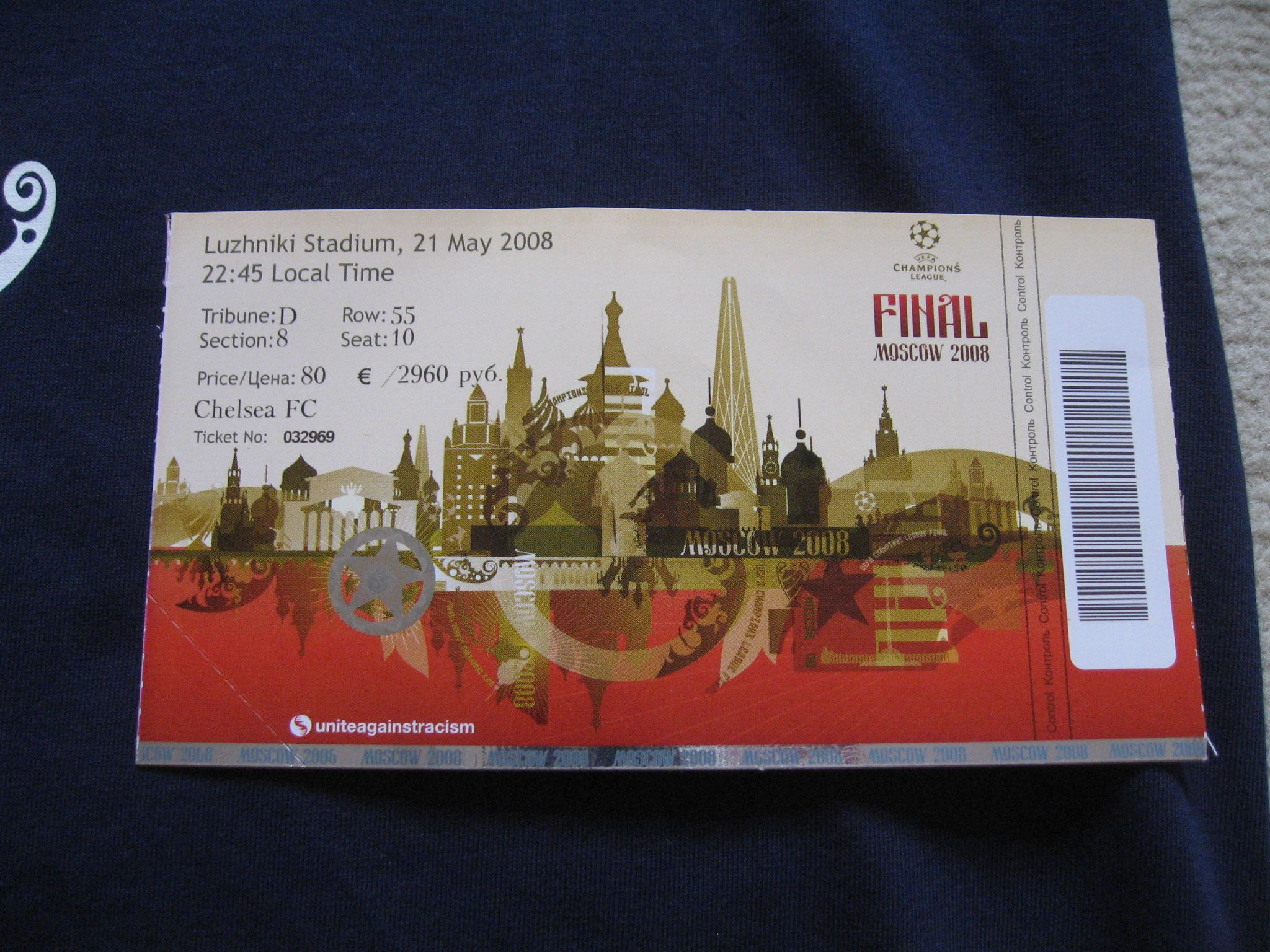
A ticket from the 2008 UEFA Champions League final

Although the Luzhniki Stadium had a usual capacity of almost 85,000 spectators, that was reduced to 69,500 for the final. Of those tickets, approximately 21,000 were reserved for each finalist club, with a further 10,500 available for purchase by the general public via the UEFA website. Recipients of those tickets were determined by a random ballot following an online application process that ran from 28 February to 19 March 2008. Tickets were available in three categories, priced at €80, €140 and €200 depending on their location in the stadium. UEFA received around 125,000 applications for tickets from the general public over the course of the three-week application process.

The clubs were able to distribute their tickets however they wished; Manchester United chose to make their allocation available to all Executive Seat Holders and any Season Ticket Holders who had successfully applied for a ticket to at least one of the club's five away Champions League matches between the group stage and the quarter-finals, while Chelsea opened up applications to all club members and season ticket holders.

Manchester United chief executive David Gill expressed disappointment that his club had only been allocated 21,000 tickets for their supporters, claiming that they could have potentially sold up to 100,000. While Manchester United managed to sell out their entire allocation, UEFA's William Gaillard indicated that Chelsea still had "up to a couple of thousand" tickets unsold the day before the game, despite claims by Chelsea's chief operations officer, Ron Gourlay, to the contrary.

One of the major concerns for English fans attending the final was the acquisition of visas for entry into Russia. However, after a period of negotiations between representatives of Russia, the United Kingdom, UEFA and the two clubs, it was agreed that fans with tickets for the match would not require a visa, provided they were also able to produce a passport with at least six months before expiry and a completed immigration card on entry into Russia. The visa-free period was initially supposed to run for 72 hours between 19 May and 23 May, but this was later extended to an eight-day period lasting from 17 to 25 May. Because of the difficulty and expense of acquiring a ticket and visa, fans who had not already got tickets were advised against travelling to Moscow by Gaillard, who also warned fans about Russia's strict laws regarding the consumption of alcohol.

Although the two clubs claimed to have sold most of the 42,000 tickets allocated to them, only about 25,000 fans were said to have travelled to Moscow from the United Kingdom, with about 110 charter flights arriving ahead of the game. According to the head of the Russian national tourist office, Mikhail Ignatiev, many fans were put off by the cost of travel and accommodation. Additionally, most of Moscow's hotels were full on the night of the game. As some fans looked to offload tickets to the match, The Moscow Times reported that the black-market price dropped from a high of €2,000 (£1,600) to around €500 (£400), while Russian TV channel Sport-1 was reporting prices as low as £300 for tickets belonging to fans who had failed to make the trip to Moscow. Among the celebrities who did not travel were Chelsea supporter and chairman of the London Organising Committee of the Olympic and Paralympic Games (LOCOG) Sebastian Coe, who had to attend meetings ahead of the 2012 Summer Olympics, and Manchester United fan and Simply Red lead singer Mick Hucknall, who was due to perform at the BMW PGA Championship at Wentworth.

=== Related events ===
As has also taken place for every Champions League final since 1997, a ceremonial handover of the UEFA Champions League trophy was held in the host city; the 2008 ceremony was at the GUM Centre in Moscow's Red Square on 3 April 2008. On behalf of 2007 champions Milan, their technical operations director and former player Leonardo, and club director Umberto Gandini presented the trophy to UEFA president Michel Platini, who passed it on to the Mayor of Moscow, Yury Luzhkov, for it to be displayed in five cities around the country – Kazan, Yekaterinburg, Krasnodar, Saint Petersburg and Samara – before returning to Moscow ahead of the final. Also in attendance at the ceremony were final ambassador Rinat Dasayev and Russian Football Union president Vitaly Mutko.

=== Match ball ===
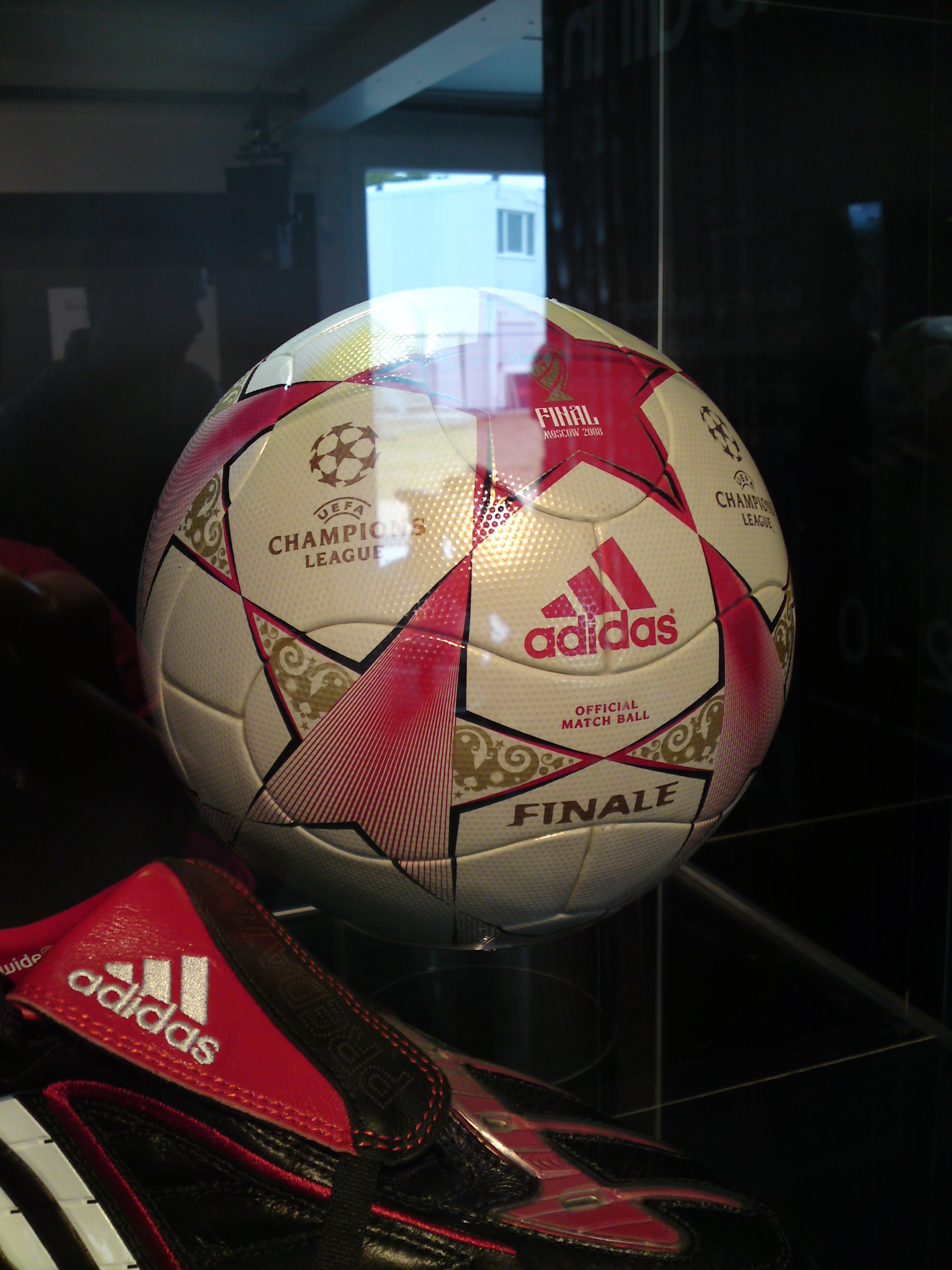
A ball from the 2008 UEFA Champions League final on display at the 2011 UEFA Champions Festival in Hyde Park, London

The match ball for the final was the Adidas Finale Moscow, the eighth in the Adidas Finale range. The ball's design was based around the "starball" pattern, inspired by the UEFA Champions League logo; the stars are dark red with gold detailing, tying in with the overall design concept for the final. Technically, the ball is based on the Adidas Europass, which was used at UEFA Euro 2008 later that summer; it has the same 14-panel configuration as the Adidas Teamgeist, but with the proprietary surface texture developed for the Europass. The ball was unveiled at a ceremony in Moscow's Manezhnaya Square, attended by UEFA General Secretary David Taylor, former Germany player and coach Franz Beckenbauer, final ambassador Rinat Dasayev and Russian Football Union president Vitaly Mutko.

=== Officials ===
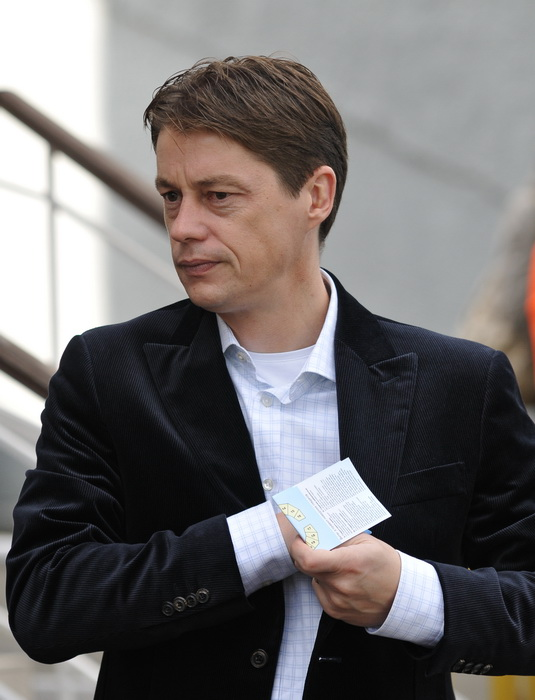
Ľuboš Micheľ refereed the final.

The referee for the final was 40-year-old Slovak referee Ľuboš Micheľ, the first Slovak to take charge of a European Cup final. His team was completed by fellow Slovak assistant referees Roman Slyško and Martin Balko, and fourth official Vladimír Hriňák. Having presided over the 2003 UEFA Cup final, Micheľ was the second man to referee the finals of both the Champions League and UEFA Cup since the latter changed to a single-legged affair in 1998; the other was Pierluigi Collina, who had been the referee in Manchester United's last Champions League final appearance in 1999. Micheľ began refereeing in 1987 at the age of 19, and took charge of his first top-flight game in 1993. That same year, he was promoted to the FIFA list of international referees, and in November 1993, he refereed his first international match – a UEFA Under-21 Championship qualifier between San Marino and England.

Micheľ's first UEFA Champions League matches came in the 1998–99 season, including Manchester United's 5–0 win over Brøndby in the group stage. Up to the 2008 final, he had refereed 55 Champions League matches (including qualifying), notably the second leg of the semi-final between Chelsea and Liverpool in 2005, in which Liverpool's Luis García scored a controversial goal that Micheľ chose to allow. He was also selected to referee at the 2000 Summer Olympics, the 2002 and 2006 FIFA World Cups, and the European Championships in 2004 and 2008.

=== Team selection ===
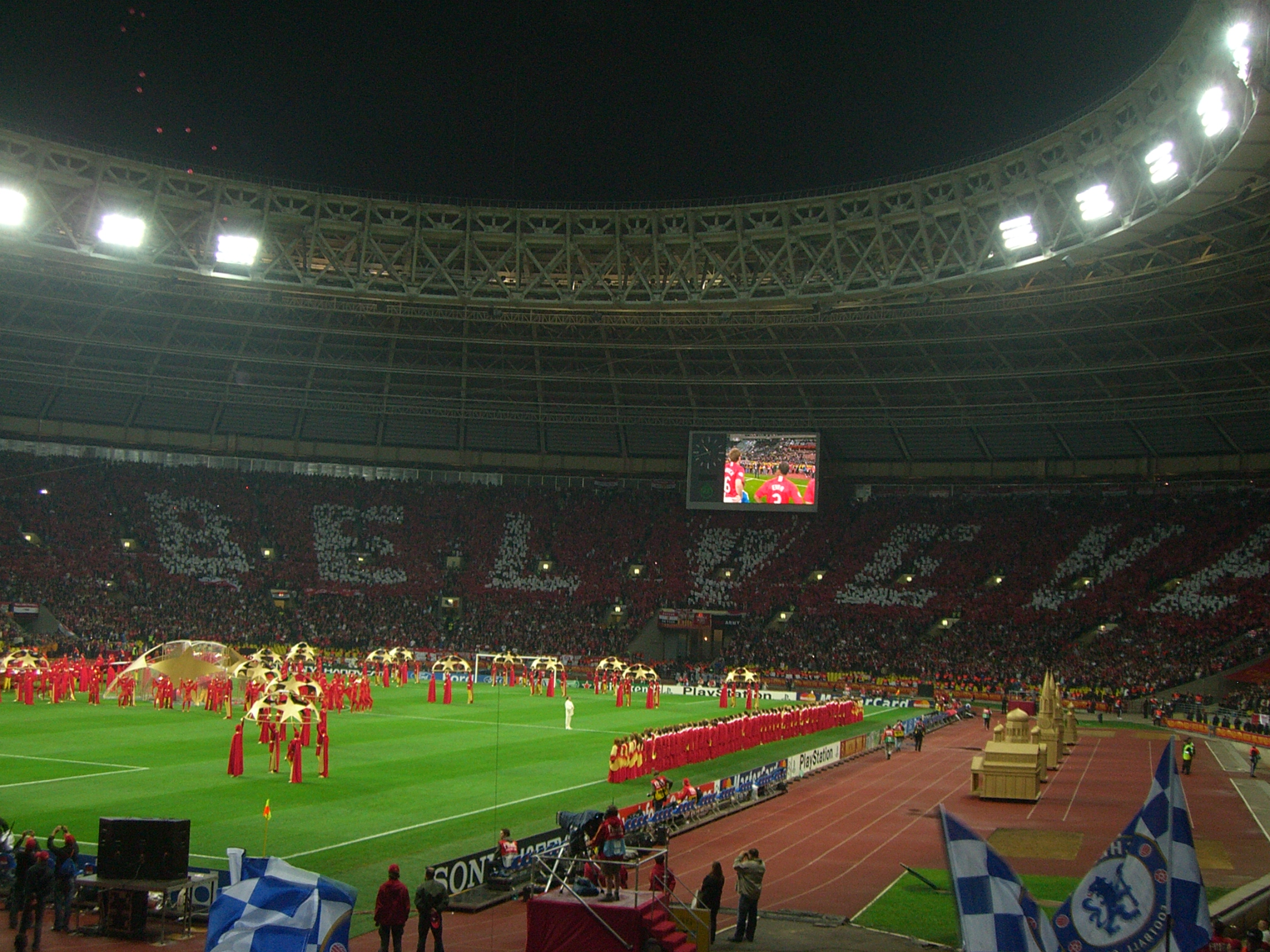
Manchester United fans display a card mosaic reading "Believe".

Sir Alex Ferguson guaranteed a place in the starting line-up for Paul Scholes, after the midfielder had missed the 1999 final through suspension. Ferguson made one change from the team that had beaten Wigan Athletic to secure the league title 10 days earlier, with Owen Hargreaves starting on the right side of midfield in a 4–4–2 formation in place of Park Ji-sung, who did not even make the substitutes bench despite starting both legs of the semi-final. Cristiano Ronaldo started on the midfield, where he was pitted against makeshift Chelsea right-back Michael Essien. This went against the prediction of The Guardian's David Pleat, who thought a duel between Ronaldo and Chelsea left-back Ashley Cole would be key to the final. Ferguson hoped his substitutes might have a big impact on the match, just as Teddy Sheringham and Ole Gunnar Solskjær did in 1999, when the pair came off the bench to help Manchester United come from behind and beat Bayern Munich. A week before the game, Ryan Giggs was philosophical about his chances of being included in the starting line-up; he was eventually named as one of seven allowed substitutes.

The day before the match, Chelsea manager Avram Grant predicted that the game would throw up few tactical surprises due to the two teams' knowledge of each other from the domestic league. Like Ferguson, Grant made only one change to the team that started Chelsea's final league game against Bolton 10 days earlier; centre-back Ricardo Carvalho overcame a recurring back injury to start in place of Alex. Captain John Terry (dislocated elbow) and striker Didier Drogba (knee) also recovered from injuries suffered against Bolton to start the match. Florent Malouda retained his place on the left wing ahead of Salomon Kalou, while Michael Essien continued at right-back, rather than in his preferred midfield position, ahead of Paulo Ferreira – who did not even make the bench despite starting both legs of the semi-final – and Juliano Belletti. Ashley Cole also started despite hurting his right ankle in training the day before the game under a heavy challenge from Claude Makélélé; Cole's replacement would have likely been Wayne Bridge, but he recovered sufficiently that Bridge was not even included in the matchday squad as cover.

== Match ==
=== Summary ===
==== First half ====
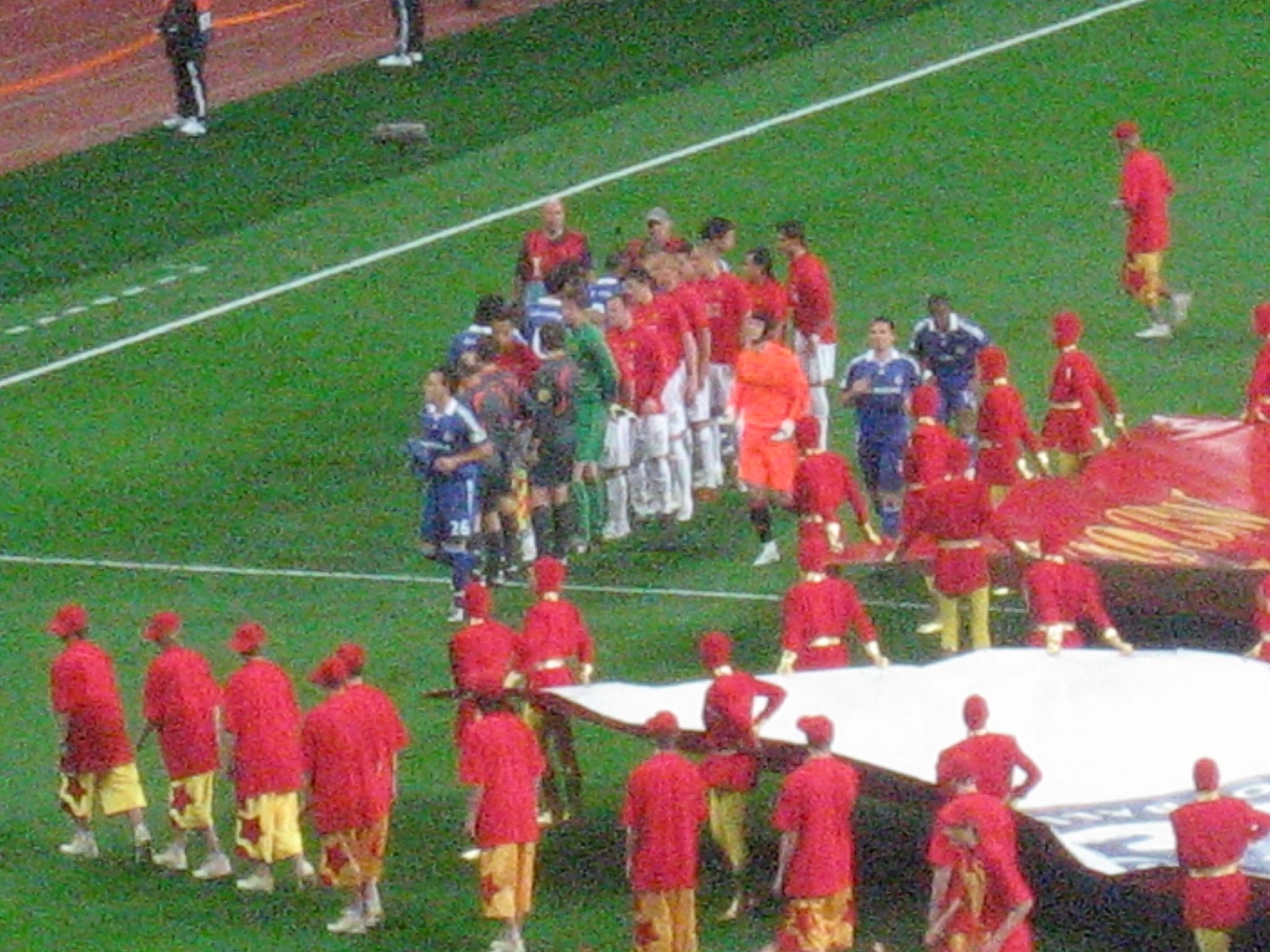
Manchester United and Chelsea players shake hands ahead of the match.

After a fairly cagey first 21 minutes, the first major incident of the game occurred when Scholes and Makélélé clashed in mid-air, resulting in both players being booked and Scholes having to leave the field for treatment to a bloody nose. The first goal of the game came five minutes later, when an interchange of passes between Scholes and Wes Brown after a throw-in on the right flank gave Brown time to pick out a cross for Ronaldo, who directed his header past Petr Čech; it was the first time United had scored in the first half of a European final, and the first time Chelsea had gone behind in their three final appearances. Chelsea almost equalised in the 33rd minute when Frank Lampard's cross was headed back into the goal area by Drogba. United's Rio Ferdinand, under pressure from Michael Ballack, was forced to head the ball towards his own goal and Edwin van der Sar pulled off a one-handed save to deny Chelsea a goal. United spent the rest of the first half pressing for a second goal, and had two good opportunities to extend their lead, but were denied by a double-save from Čech. Wayne Rooney delivered a long ball into the path of Ronaldo and the United goalscorer placed his cross on the head of the diving Carlos Tevez, only for Čech to deny him. Chelsea's failure to clear the loose ball gave Michael Carrick the chance to extend his side's lead, but Čech was again equal to the task with another save.

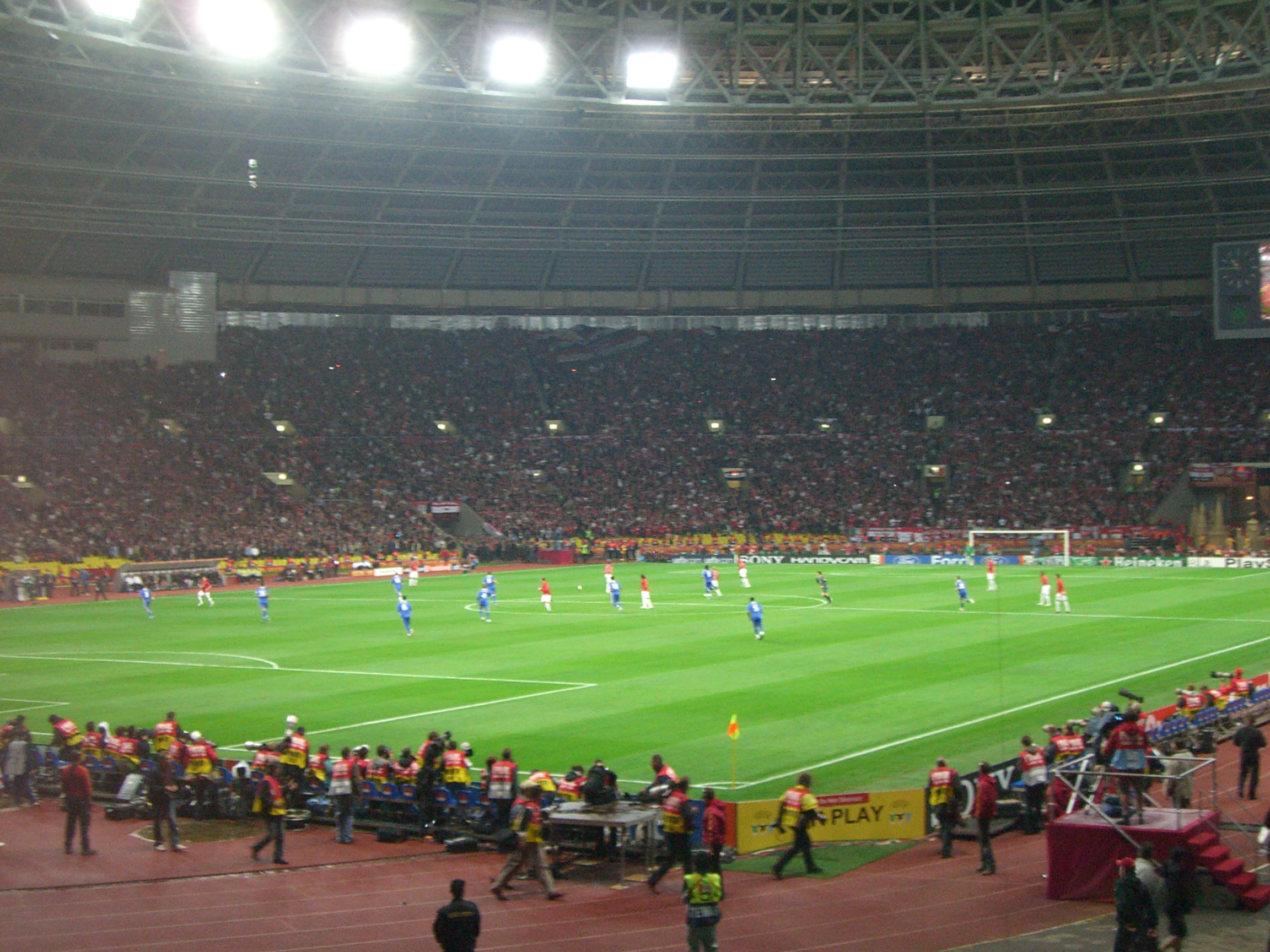
Manchester United in possession

Chelsea survived the pressure, as Tevez failed to connect with a low cross from Rooney, and equalised in the final minute of the first half. The goal followed a long-range shot by Michael Essien, which deflected first off Nemanja Vidić and then Ferdinand. The ball's change in direction caused Van der Sar to lose his footing, leaving Lampard, who had made a run from deep, with a simple finish. In celebration, Lampard looked up and pointed to the sky with both hands in memory of his mother, Pat, who had died a month earlier. At the end of the first half, Sir Alex Ferguson confronted referee Micheľ, "jabbing out an angry finger and spitting out a few choice words".

==== Second half ====
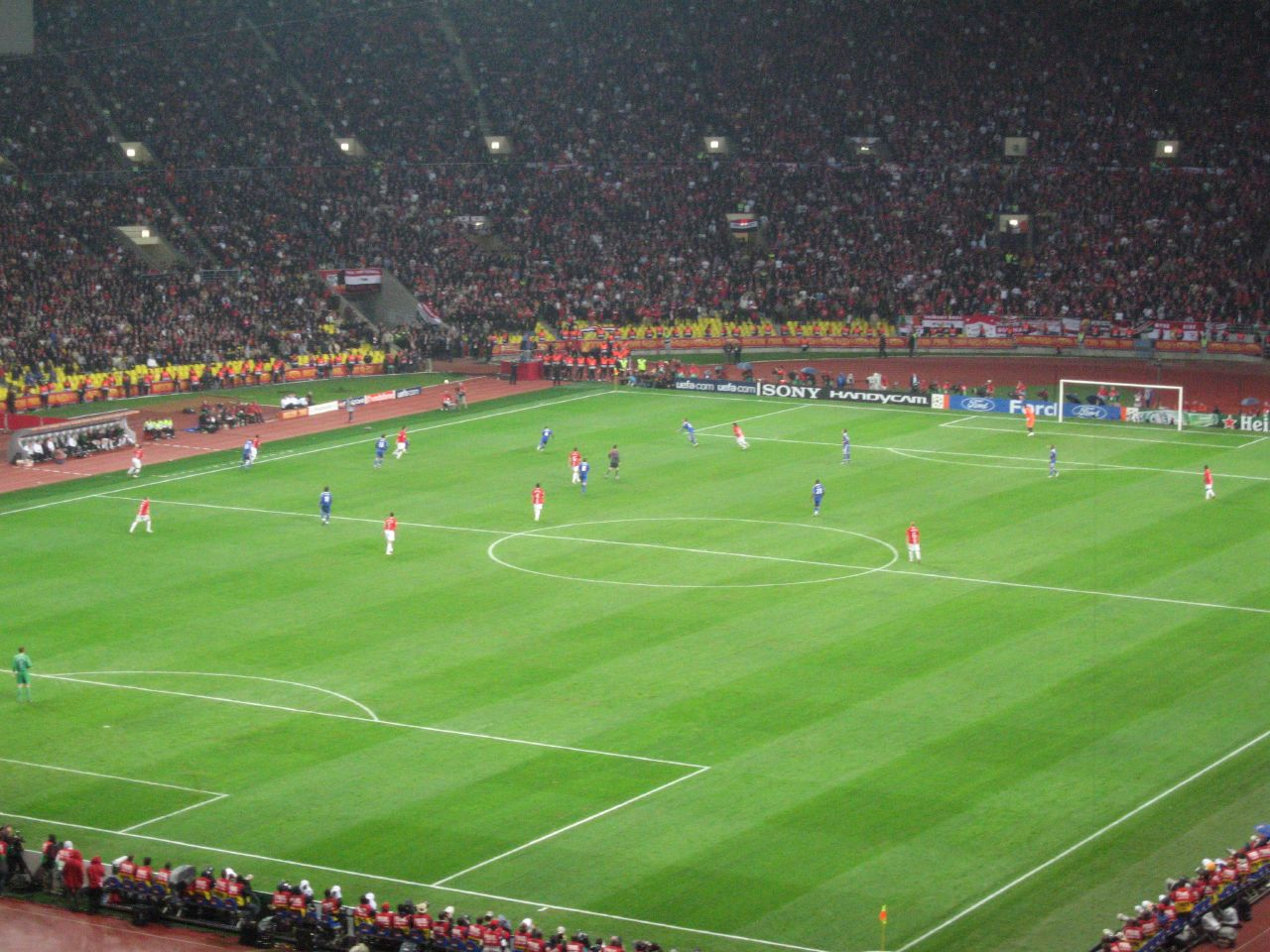
Manchester United go on the attack.

Lampard's equaliser at the end of the first half led to a transformed Chelsea in the second, and they kept United on the back foot for long periods. Nevertheless, the Red Devils managed to contain most of Chelsea's attacks. Chelsea had a few opportunities to take the lead, with Essien breaking free of United's defence in the 54th minute, only for his left-footed shot to curl well over the goal. Chelsea's closest opportunity to take the lead came in the 77th minute when a Drogba shot struck the post from 25 yards (23 m) out. The Ivorian striker came very close to turning Joe Cole's low cross home for the winner four minutes from time, but fired wide. Ryan Giggs was then introduced in place of Scholes, making a record 759th appearance for Manchester United.

==== Extra time ====
The game moved into extra time, and both teams had chances to score a vital second goal; first, Lampard hit the underside of the bar with a left-footed shot after the ball was played in to him with a disguised pass from Ballack, then Giggs stabbed the ball left-footed towards goal instead of sweeping it with his weaker right foot, only to see it headed off the line by Terry. Late in the second half of extra time, the ball was put out of play so players could be treated for cramp. In returning the ball to Chelsea, Tevez put it out for another throw-in deep in Chelsea's half then signalled to his teammates to put pressure on the restart. Terry and Ballack reacted angrily to this and were joined by several of their teammates, while Manchester United's players rushed in to protect Tevez. Ultimately, most of the 22 players were involved in the fracas. Amid the melée, assistant referee Martin Balko saw Drogba slap Nemanja Vidić and reported the incident to referee Micheľ. After showing a yellow card to Ballack, Micheľ showed a red card to Drogba for violent conduct, making him only the second player in history to be sent off in a European Cup final after Arsenal goalkeeper Jens Lehmann in 2006. In preparation for the penalty shoot-out, both clubs made last-minute substitutions; Manchester United brought on Anderson in place of Brown, while Chelsea took off Makélélé in favour of Belletti.

==== Penalty shoot-out ====
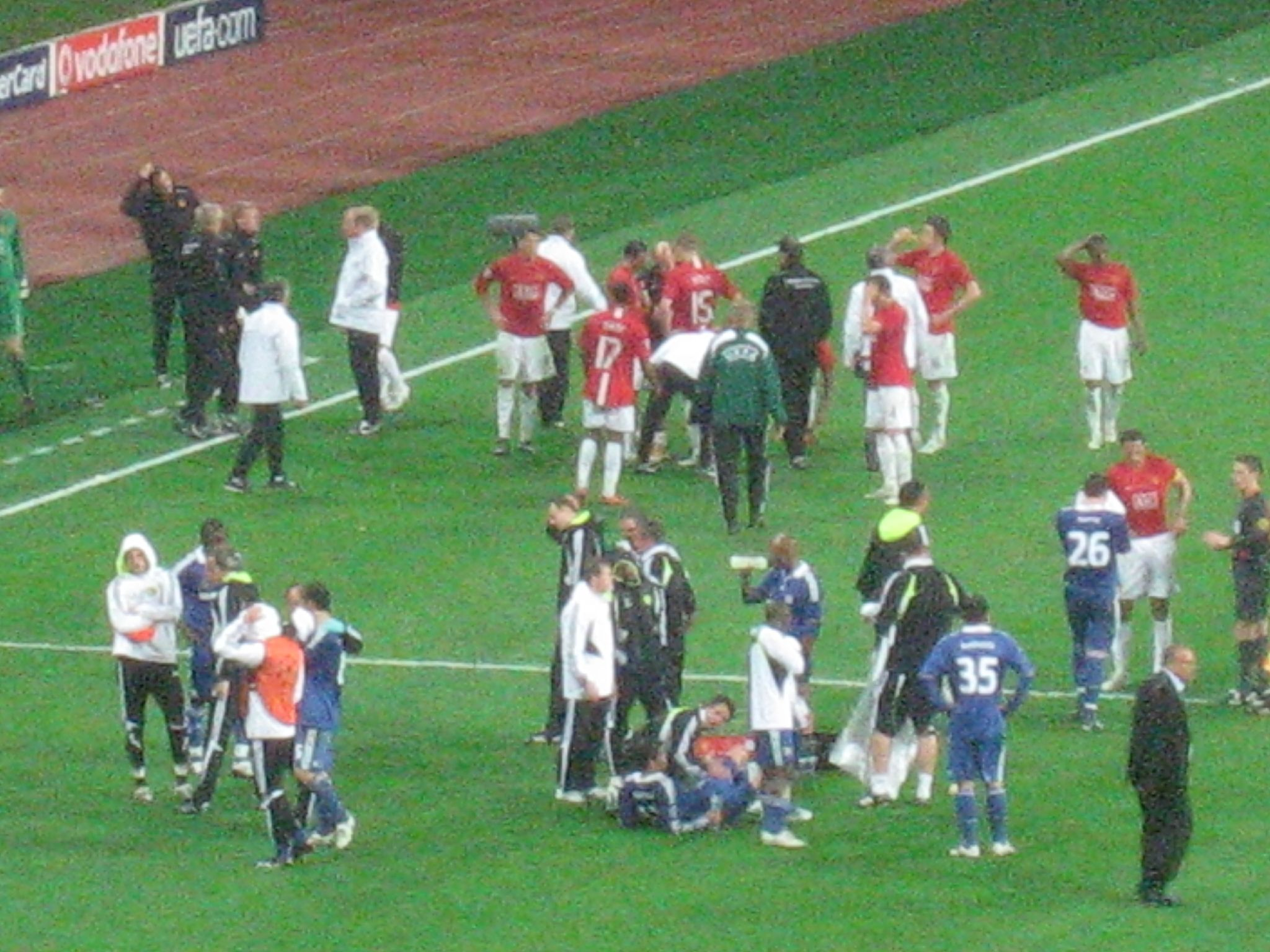
The players prepare for the penalty shoot-out.

As the match went to penalties, Rio Ferdinand won the coin toss for Manchester United, and opted for his side to go first in the shoot-out, which would be taken at the end housing the Manchester United fans. Tevez stepped up first and sent Čech the wrong way. Ballack was next up, shooting powerfully past Van der Sar. Carrick buried his spot-kick, as did Belletti with his first touch of the game. The first miss of the shoot-out came from Ronaldo, who characteristically stuttered in his run-up in an attempt to put Čech off, but the goalkeeper dived to his right to save.

Lampard then put Chelsea 3–2 ahead, but Hargreaves levelled things up with a shot into the top corner. Ashley Cole was the next up, and Van der Sar got a strong hand to the ball but could not keep it out. Nani then knew he had to score to keep United in it, and he did, leaving it up to Terry to win the cup for Chelsea; however, he lost his footing when planting his standing foot by the ball, and, even though Van der Sar was sent the wrong way, his mis-hit effort struck the outside of the right post and went wide.

With the first penalty of sudden death, Anderson – like Belletti – scored with his first kick of the game. Kalou then sent Van der Sar the wrong way to make it 5–5. Giggs was next up and he was also successful. Nicolas Anelka was next, and before his kick, Van der Sar pointed to his left to indicate his prediction that he would kick to that side, as had the six players who took their penalties before him, only to correctly dive to his right and make the save to secure European football's top prize for United for the third time in their history.

=== Details ===
21 May 2008
22:45 UTC+4

Manchester United (England)	1–1 (a.e.t.)	(England) Chelsea
Ronaldo 26'	Report	Lampard 45'
Penalties
Tevez (penalty scored); Carrick (penalty scored); Ronaldo (penalty missed); Hargreaves (penalty scored); Nani (penalty scored); Anderson (penalty scored); Giggs (penalty scored)	6–5	(penalty scored) Ballack; (penalty scored) Belletti; (penalty scored) Lampard; (penalty scored) A. Cole; (penalty missed) Terry; (penalty scored) Kalou; (penalty missed) Anelka

Luzhniki Stadium, Moscow
Attendance: 67,310
Referee: Ľuboš Micheľ (Slovakia)

Manchester United	Chelsea

GK	1	(Netherlands) Edwin van der Sar
RB	6	(England) Wes Brown		(substituted off) 120+5'
CB	5	(England) Rio Ferdinand (c)	(yellow card) 43'
CB	15	(Serbia) Nemanja Vidić	(yellow card) 111'
LB	3	(France) Patrice Evra
RM	4	(England) Owen Hargreaves
CM	18	(England) Paul Scholes	(yellow card) 21'	(substituted off) 87'
CM	16	(England) Michael Carrick
LM	7	(Portugal) Cristiano Ronaldo
CF	10	(England) Wayne Rooney		(substituted off) 101'
CF	32	(Argentina) Carlos Tevez	(yellow card) 116'
Substitutes:
GK	29	(Poland) Tomasz Kuszczak
DF	22	(Republic of Ireland) John O'Shea
DF	27	(France) Mikaël Silvestre
MF	8	(Brazil) Anderson		(substituted on) 120+5'
MF	11	(Wales) Ryan Giggs		(substituted on) 87'
MF	17	(Portugal) Nani		(substituted on) 101'
MF	24	(Scotland) Darren Fletcher
Manager:
(Scotland) Sir Alex Ferguson

GK	1	(Czech Republic) Petr Čech
RB	5	(Ghana) Michael Essien	(yellow card) 118'
CB	6	(Portugal) Ricardo Carvalho	(yellow card) 45+2'
CB	26	(England) John Terry (c)
LB	3	(England) Ashley Cole
DM	4	(France) Claude Makélélé	(yellow card) 21'	(substituted off) 120+4'
CM	13	(Germany) Michael Ballack	(yellow card) 116'
CM	8	(England) Frank Lampard
RW	10	(England) Joe Cole		(substituted off) 99'
LW	15	(France) Florent Malouda		(substituted off) 92'
CF	11	(Ivory Coast) Didier Drogba	(red card) 116'
Substitutes:
GK	23	(Italy) Carlo Cudicini
DF	33	(Brazil) Alex
DF	35	(Brazil) Juliano Belletti		(substituted on) 120+4'
MF	12	(Nigeria) Mikel John Obi
FW	7	(Ukraine) Andriy Shevchenko
FW	21	(Ivory Coast) Salomon Kalou		(substituted on) 92'
FW	39	(France) Nicolas Anelka		(substituted on) 99'
Manager:
(Israel) Avram Grant

UEFA Man of the Match:
Edwin van der Sar (Manchester United)
Fans' Man of the Match:
Cristiano Ronaldo (Manchester United)

Assistant referees:
Roman Slyško (Slovakia)
Martin Balko (Slovakia)
Fourth official:
Vladimir Hriňák (Slovakia)

=== Statistics ===
First half
Statistic	Manchester United	Chelsea
Goals scored	1	1
Total shots	5	6
Shots on target	3	1
Saves	1	2
Ball possession	59%	41%
Corner kicks	2	2
Fouls committed	5	9
Offsides	0	1
Yellow cards	2	2
Red cards	0	0

Second half and extra time
Statistic	Manchester United	Chelsea
Goals scored	0	0
Total shots	7	18
Shots on target	2	2
Saves	0	2
Ball possession	57%	43%
Corner kicks	3	6
Fouls committed	17	16
Offsides	1	1
Yellow cards	2	2
Red cards	0	1

Overall
Statistic	Manchester United	Chelsea
Goals scored	1	1
Total shots	12	24
Shots on target	5	3
Saves	1	4
Ball possession	58%	42%
Corner kicks	5	8
Fouls committed	22	25
Offsides	1	2
Yellow cards	4	4
Red cards	0	1

== Post-match ==
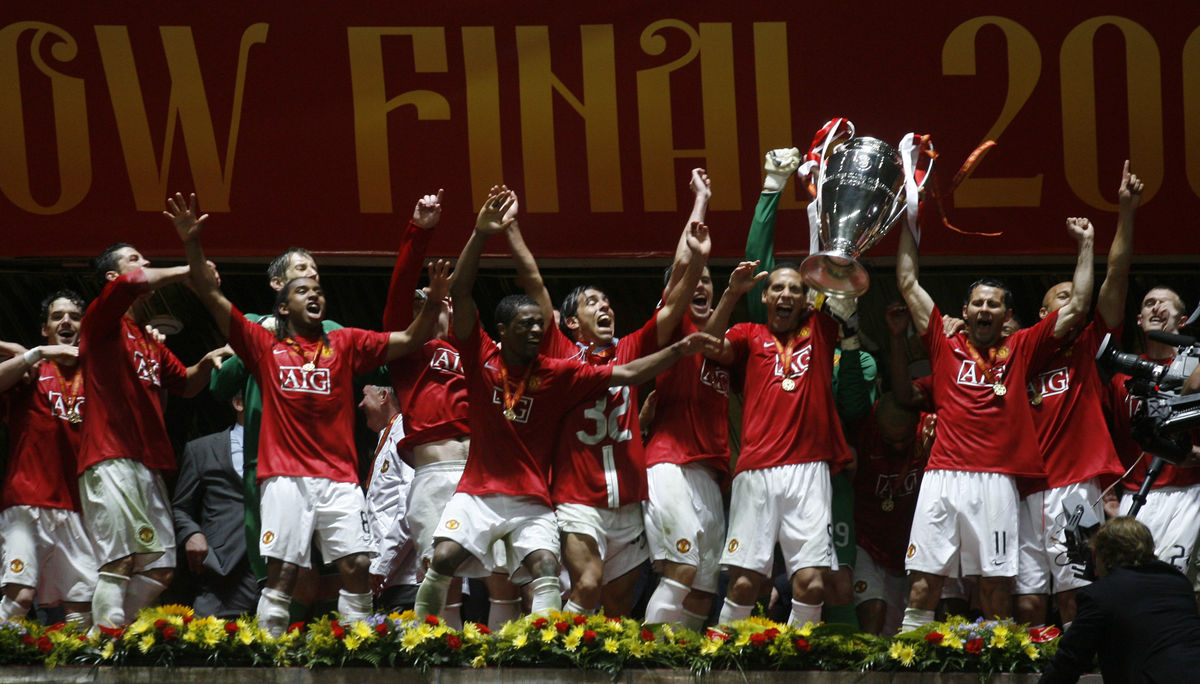
Manchester United celebrate winning their third Champions League title.

Having missed what would have been Chelsea's winning penalty, John Terry had to be consoled by his manager, Avram Grant. The Manchester United players formed a guard of honour for Chelsea, lining up in two opposite rows at the foot of the steps up to the presentation party and applauding as the Chelsea team – led by chief executive Peter Kenyon – walked through. As Drogba had been sent off during the game, he was not allowed to collect his medal himself and it was given to Grant; when he returned to pitch level, Grant tossed his own medal into the crowd. After Chelsea's team received their medals, Munich air disaster survivor Bobby Charlton, who had captained United to the European Cup title in 1968, led his team up to collect their medals in his capacity as a club director. UEFA President Michel Platini presented both Kenyon and Charlton with commemorative plaques and medals, but Charlton declined to accept his medal; he later donated it to the club museum. When all the players had received their medals, Platini presented Manchester United with the trophy, which Rio Ferdinand – as team captain for the match – and Ryan Giggs – standing in for injured club captain Gary Neville – lifted together.

United manager Sir Alex Ferguson said his side deserved to win the game despite Chelsea performing better in the second half, and acknowledged the historical significance of the win, which came 40 years after the club's first European Cup title and 50 years after the Munich air disaster. He also said it was the first penalty shoot-out he had ever won as a manager: "I won the Charity Shield that way, but that doesn't really count. The European Cup? The FA Cup? The Scottish cups? Never. I've lost three with Aberdeen and three with United, so seventh time lucky – magnificent." Ferguson later apologised to Park Ji-sung for not including him in the matchday squad. Ronaldo expressed his relief at his side's shoot-out victory, saying, "In my opinion I played well in the game, scored a goal, and then missed the penalty. It would have been the worst day of my life. We deserved to win as we played better in the whole game. It means everything to me, we have won both trophies, it is the best day in my life." He then attempted to quash speculation about his future and a potential transfer to Real Madrid, saying, "I am going to stay."

Carvalho, Lampard and Grant all refused to point the finger of blame at Terry, but assistant manager Henk ten Cate admitted that Terry was not originally due to take one of the first five penalties (if Drogba had not been sent off, the Ivorian would have taken the fifth penalty). Chelsea offered Terry counselling to help cope with having missed his penalty and lost the match. Terry was later accused of spitting at Manchester United striker Tevez, but a UEFA report into the video evidence cleared him of any wrongdoing. Terry also wrote an open letter, published on Chelsea's official website, apologising for missing the penalty and costing Chelsea the trophy. Nicolas Anelka, who took the decisive kick, revealed he did not actually want to take a penalty, citing his lack of warm-up time.

Following the loss, Grant's future as manager was thrown into doubt, and owner Roman Abramovich (who attended the final), chief executive Peter Kenyon, director Eugene Tenenbaum and chairman Bruce Buck were reportedly already seeking a replacement for Grant the day after the game. Buck was unimpressed with Chelsea's second-place league finish and being runners-up in the Champions League, saying, "We have very high expectations at Chelsea and a couple of second-place finishes is just not good enough for us." Grant was officially sacked three days after the match. Buck also confirmed plans to trim the Chelsea squad by selling at least three players, and said that discussions were due to take place regarding Drogba's future with the club, after the striker reportedly expressed a desire to leave earlier in the season.

In Moscow, around 6,000 police were on duty to prevent a repeat of the 2008 UEFA Cup final riots in Manchester a week earlier, but police reported that none of the 40,000 visiting fans were arrested, due in part to public safety measures such as a ban on public drinking and no large screens being set up for members of the public to watch the game outdoors. In London, violence escalated outside Fulham Broadway tube station, near Chelsea's Stamford Bridge ground; police arrested 12 people on public order offences, while one man was arrested for grievous bodily harm, drink driving and dangerous driving, after he hit a 31-year-old while attempting to drive down Fulham Broadway. Five police were also believed to have been injured in the incident.

Manchester United had originally intended to hold a parade through the streets of Manchester to celebrate their Double triumph on their return from Moscow on 22 May. However, following the violence that occurred at the UEFA Cup final, Greater Manchester Police determined that any victory parade could only take place later in the summer. The public parade was ultimately cancelled, but fans were given the opportunity to photograph the players with the Premier League and Champions League trophies before Manchester United's home friendly against Juventus on 6 August 2008.

=== Rewards ===
In addition to the €5.4 million participation bonus, €5.7 million won from the group stage and €7.7 million from the three rounds prior to the final, Manchester United also received €7 million for winning the final. Chelsea also received €5.4 million for participation and €7.7 million for the first three knockout rounds, but received only €5.1 million from the group stage, having drawn two more games and won two fewer than Manchester United. Chelsea also received €4 million for finishing as runners-up.

In addition to the €23.4 million and €19.8 million earned respectively by the two clubs as prize money, Manchester United and Chelsea received money from the UEFA market pool share. The market pool share had a total value of €277 million, shared between the 32 clubs that qualified for the group stage. The pool was split in proportion to each national association's strength in the television market, with the Premier League clubs receiving around €60 million in total from the pool. The money was then split between the four teams who qualified for the Champions League from the 2006–07 FA Premier League based on their position in the league and the number of matches played in the 2007–08 Champions League. This meant that Manchester United, having won the 2006–07 Premier League, received around €19.5 million, and Chelsea, as runners-up, received around €16.5 million.

As winners of the Champions League, Manchester United earned places in the 2008 UEFA Super Cup and the 2008 FIFA Club World Cup. In the Super Cup, United faced 2008 UEFA Cup final winners Zenit Saint Petersburg at Stade Louis II in Monaco on 29 August 2008; Zenit won the match 2–1. As UEFA's representative at the Club World Cup, Manchester United entered the tournament at the semi-final stage, where they beat 2008 AFC Champions League winners Gamba Osaka 5–3. They then beat 2008 Copa Libertadores winners LDU Quito 1–0 in the final to become the first English club to win the competition.

== Media ==
=== Broadcasters ===
The match was shown simultaneously in the United Kingdom by free-to-air channel ITV1 and subscription channel Sky Sports 1, whose networks in 2005 had won the rights to broadcast UEFA Champions League matches for three seasons from 2006–07 to 2008–09. Sky acted as the host broadcaster for UEFA, providing pictures to all other networks covering the final with around 30 cameras and 100 crew members. The ITV broadcast was led by Steve Rider, with Clive Tyldesley commentating, David Pleat as an analyst, and Andy Townsend and Mark Hughes as in-studio pundits. Sky's team consisted of presenter Richard Keys, joined in the studio by Graeme Souness and Jamie Redknapp, and Ruud Gullit via phone, with commentary from Martin Tyler and analysis from Andy Gray.

ITV's viewing figures peaked at 14.6 million in the five minutes from 22:30, during the penalty shoot-out. During the match (from 19:45 to 22:35), the number of viewers averaged at 11.1 million (46% of the total audience), while the average over the entire broadcast from 19:00 to 23:15 was 9.6 million (43% of the total). Meanwhile, Sky Sports' peak was 2 million viewers in a five-minute period near the end of extra time; their average for the match was 1.8 million, and 1.3 million for the full broadcast. In Ireland, RTÉ Two's coverage of the match reached a one-minute peak of 998,000 (62% share), with an average over their four-hour broadcast of 653,000 (44% share). In the United States, viewership was split between the English-language channel ESPN2 and Spanish-language channel ESPN Deportes; viewership on ESPN2 averaged at 1.097 million, while ESPN Deportes received an average of 213,000 viewers, totalling 1.31 million. It was the first time a UEFA match on ESPN had been watched by more than 1 million viewers.

=== Advertising ===
Based on an expected audience of up to 13 million, ITV raised the prices of their 30-second advertising slots during the final from between £100,000 and £150,000 to as much as £250,000. It was estimated that ITV would stand to make £9 million in advertising revenue during the final, rising to £10 million if it went to extra time and penalties; this compared with amounts of £2–3 million normally received for its Wednesday night schedule and £3–4 million for a Champions League final with no British teams involved. Among the confirmed advertisers on ITV were Ford, Cadbury, Nike, Heineken, Audi and BlackBerry. Sky's advertising prices were not reported, but among their scheduled advertisers were Audi, Ford, Nike, Samsung and Pepsi.

== See also ==
- 2008 UEFA Cup final
- 2008 UEFA Women's Cup final
- 2007–08 Chelsea F.C. season
- 2007–08 Manchester United F.C. season
- Chelsea F.C. in international football competitions
- English football clubs in international competitions
- List of football matches between British clubs in UEFA competitions
- Manchester United F.C. in European football
