= Europass (disambiguation) =

Europass is a portfolio of five documents intended to standardise skill and qualification details for European citizens.

Europass may also refer to:

- The old name for the Eurail Select Pass rail ticket
- Adidas Europass, official match ball design for the UEFA Euro 2008 soccer competition
- A proposed mandatory identification for all European citizens in "The Writing on the Wall" episode of Yes Minister
