= Adidas Jabulani =

Football by Adidas

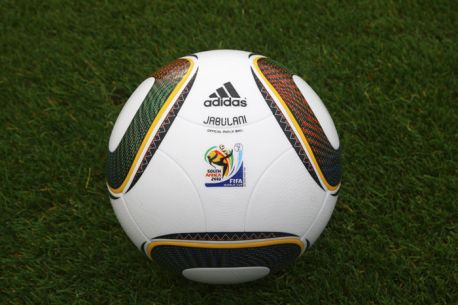
- Type: Association football
- Inventor: Adidas
- Inception: 2010; 16 years ago
- Manufacturer: Adidas
- Last production year: 2012; 14 years ago

The Jabulani (/ˌdʒæbjʊˈlɑːni/ JAB-yuu-LAH-nee, Zulu: [dʒaɓuˈlaːni]) was a football manufactured by Adidas. It was the official match ball for the 2010 FIFA World Cup.

The ball is made from eight spherically moulded panels and has a textured surface intended to improve aerodynamics. It was consequently developed into the Adidas Tango 12 series of footballs. The Jabulani had a mixed reception during the World Cup due to its unusual flight pattern. The NASA Ames Research Center studied its performance and compared it to the +Teamgeist Berlin (used in the 2006 World Cup) and found it had a noticeable "knuckleball" effect.

Jabulani, meaning "be happy!" in Zulu, is the imperative plural form of the verb jabula "to be happy". Its design was much maligned by players at the World Cup, and production ceased after two years.

== Design ==
The ball was constructed consisting of eight (down from 14 in the 2006 World Cup) thermally bonded, three-dimensional panels. These then were spherically moulded from ethylene-vinyl acetate (EVA) and thermoplastic polyurethanes (TPU). The surface of the ball was textured with grooves, a technology developed by Adidas called "Grip 'n' Groove" that was intended to improve the ball's aerodynamics. The design had received considerable academic input, being developed in partnership with researchers from Loughborough University, United Kingdom.

=== Technical specification ===
	FIFA-approved standard	Jabulani measurements
Circumference	68.5–69.5 cm	69.0 ± 0.2 cm
Diameter	≤ 1.5% difference	≤ 1.0% difference
Water absorption	≤ 10% weight increase	~ 0% weight increase
Weight	420–445 g	440 ± 0.2 g
Uniform rebound test	≤ 10 cm	≤ 6 cm
Loss of pressure	≤ 20%	≤ 10%

=== Colouring ===
The ball had four triangular design elements on a white background. The number 11 was prominent in the use of the ball, as 11 different colours were used; representing the 11 starting players in a football squad, the 11 official languages of South Africa, and the 11 South African communities.

The Jabulani Angola, used at the 2010 African Cup of Nations in Angola, was coloured to represent the yellow, red and black of the host nation's flag. An orange version is available for winter games and a yellow version for indoor games.

A gold colour version, called the Jo'bulani (/ˌdʒoʊbjʊˈlɑːni/ JOH-byuu-LAH-nee), was used for the 2010 FIFA World Cup Final. Its name is a portmanteau of "Jabulani" and "Jo'burg", a common nickname for Johannesburg, the match venue. The gold colouring of the ball mirrored the colour of the FIFA World Cup Trophy and also echoed another of Johannesburg's nicknames: "the City of Gold". The Jo'bulani ball was the second World Cup Final ball to be produced, the first time being the +Teamgeist Berlin for the 2006 FIFA World Cup.

=== Manufacturing ===
The balls were made in China, using latex bladders from Enkay Rubber Group, India, thermoplastic polyurethane-elastomer from Taiwan, ethylene vinyl acetate, isotropic polyester/cotton fabric, glue and ink from China.

== Appearances ==
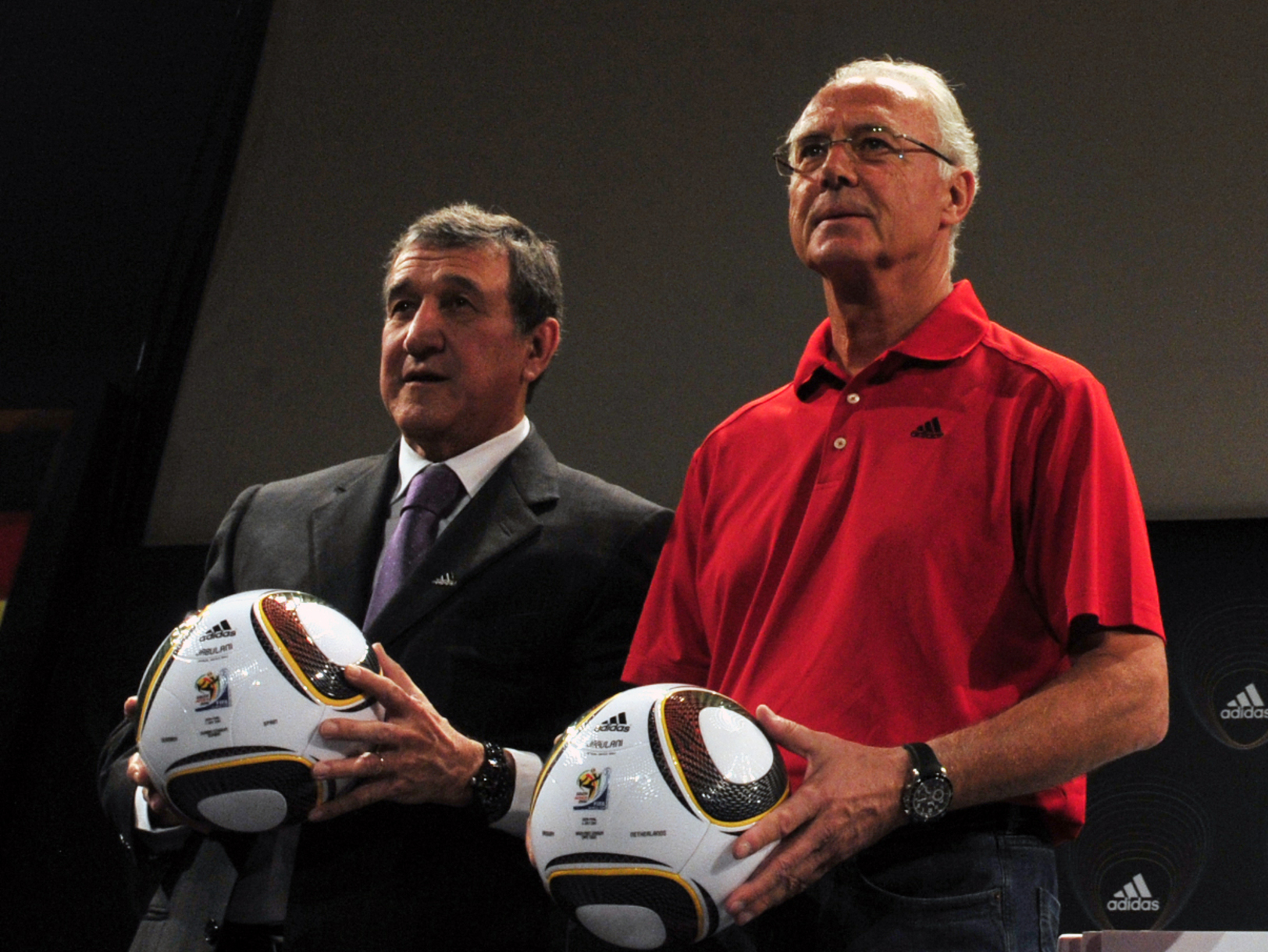
Carlos Alberto Parreira and Franz Beckenbauer presenting the 2010 FIFA World Cup semi-final match balls

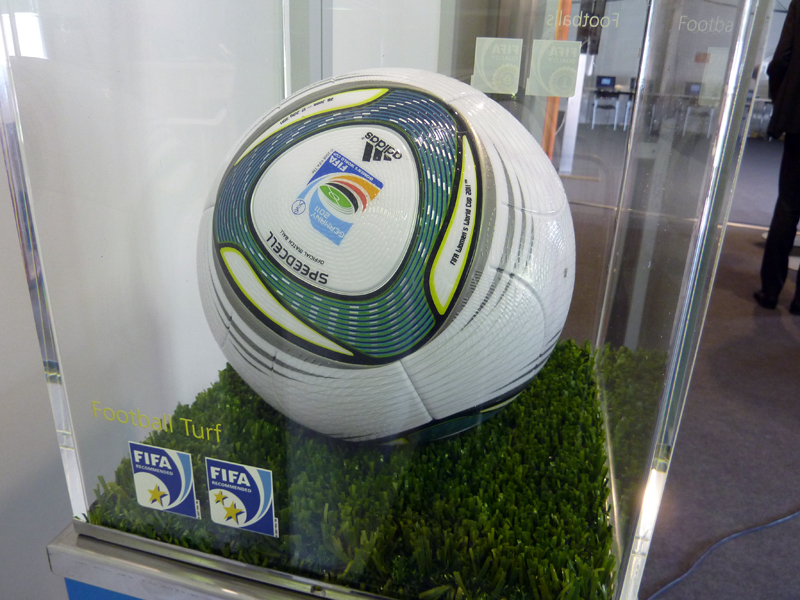
The Adidas SpeedCell for the 2011 FIFA Women's World Cup

It was announced on 4 December 2009 that the Jabulani was to be the official match ball of the 2010 FIFA World Cup held in South Africa. The ball was also used as the match ball for the 2009 FIFA Club World Cup in the United Arab Emirates, and a special version of the ball, the Jabulani Angola, was the match ball of the 2010 African Cup of Nations.

This ball was also used in the 2010 Clausura Tournament of Argentina as well as the 2010 MLS season and 2011 MLS season in the United States and Canada in the league's colours of blue and green.

In Europe domestic leagues, it was used in the 2010–11 Bundesliga in the league signature colours of red and white, known as the Torfabrik ("Goal Factory"), and in the 2010–11 Primeira Liga, coloured in white.

UEFA used the ball in the Super Cup and the Europa League with respective official match ball colours and design.

A new version of the ball called the "SpeedCell" was manufactured for the 2010 FIFA Club World Cup and the 2011 FIFA Women's World Cup. It featured the same technology as the Jabulani, but in a blue color scheme.

The ball was used in the J.League during the 2010 and 2011 seasons.

== Reception ==
=== Criticism ===
Even more than the Fevernova and Teamgeist at the two previous tournaments, the Jabulani received pre- and post-tournament criticism. Iker Casillas said, "It is very sad that a competition so important as the world championship will be played with such a horrible ball." Similar complaints came from Giampaolo Pazzini and Claudio Bravo.

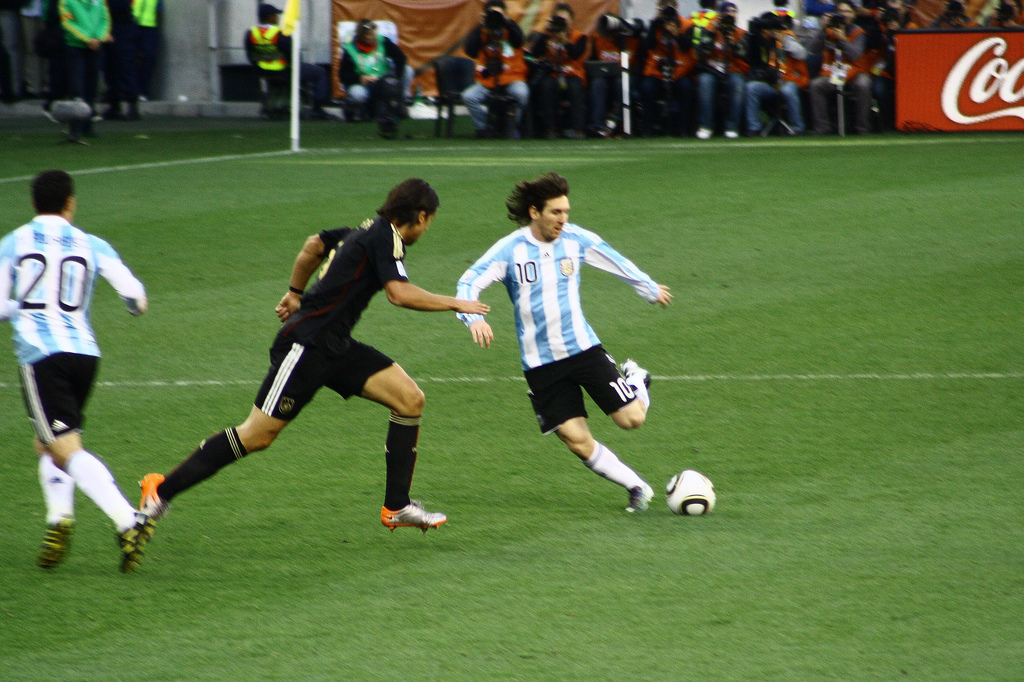
Lionel Messi and Sami Khedira disputing an Adidas Jabulani ball at the 2010 World Cup

Italian goalkeeper Gianluigi Buffon said, "The new model is absolutely inadequate and I think it's shameful letting play such an important competition, where a lot of champions take part, with a ball like this" while Brazilian striker Luís Fabiano called the ball "supernatural", as it unpredictably changed direction when traveling through the air. Brazilian striker Robinho stated, "For sure the guy who designed this ball never played football. But there is nothing we can do; we have to play with it." Joe Hart of England, after training with the ball for a number of days, said the "balls have been doing anything but staying in my gloves". He did, however, describe the ball as "good fun" to use, even though it is hard work for goalkeepers to cope with. English goalkeeper David James said that, "The ball is dreadful. It's horrible, but it's horrible for everyone." It was suggested the ball behaved "completely different" at altitude by former England coach Fabio Capello.

Denmark coach Morten Olsen, after their 1–0 friendly defeat at the hands of Australia, said, "We played with an impossible ball and we need to get used to it." Argentina forward Lionel Messi stated, "The ball is very complicated for the goalkeepers and for us [forwards]." Argentine coach Diego Maradona said, "We won't see any long passes in this World Cup because the ball doesn't fly straight."

American Clint Dempsey was more favorable. He said that, "If you just hit it solid, you can get a good knuckle on the ball... you've just got to pay a little bit more, you know, attention when you pass the ball sometimes."

Brazil goalkeeper Júlio César compared it to a "supermarket" ball that favoured strikers and worked against goalkeepers. Despite this, it was suggested by The Guardian on 16 June 2010 that the Jabulani ball might have been responsible for the goal drought in the first round of the tournament. The Guardian mentioned the FIFA representative, who was queried daily for his opinion on the goal drought, as saying it was probably too early to make a definitive judgment, though it would be hard to deny that the first round was more cagey and defensively minded than usual. Owen Gibson of The Guardian suggested that a lack of confidence in how the ball would travel could be affecting the number of shots taken. Following Portugal's 7–0 victory over North Korea in the second round of the group stage, however, Portugal's coach Carlos Queiroz said, "We love the ball."

In July 2010, former Liverpool footballer Craig Johnston wrote a 12-page open letter to FIFA president Sepp Blatter outlining perceived failings of the Jabulani ball. He compiled feedback from professional players criticizing the ball for poor performance and asked that it be abandoned by FIFA.

Will Prochaska, director of the African social enterprise Alive & Kicking, criticised the decision not to use an African-made ball, such as one by his organisation.

=== Response from Adidas ===
A number of Adidas-sponsored players responded favourably to the ball. Álvaro Arbeloa, commented that, "It's round, like always." Brazilian midfielder Kaká said, "For me, contact with the ball is all-important, and that's just great with this ball." English midfielder Frank Lampard called it "a very strong ball, true to hit". German midfielder Michael Ballack said it was "fantastic; the ball does exactly what I want it to". Uruguayan forward Diego Forlán, who tied for the Golden Ball, studied the ball in the months before the tournament, explaining he had "lot of practice, a lot of training and again a lot of practice. I got lucky and [the Jabulani] behaved very well back then. And we got along great."

Adidas has said that the ball had been used since January 2010, and that most feedback from players had been positive. A spokesperson said the company was "surprised" by the negative reaction to the ball, and highlighted that the frequent pre-tournament criticism a new ball receives inevitably dies down as the tournament proceeds.

=== Response from FIFA ===
On 27 June 2010, FIFA acknowledged concerns about the ball, but also said that they would not act on the problem until after the tournament. According to secretary general Jérôme Valcke, FIFA will discuss the matter with coaches and teams after the World Cup, then meet with the manufacturer Adidas.

=== NASA study ===
NASA scientists at the Fluid Mechanics Laboratory at NASA's Ames Research Center, Moffett Field, California tested the performance of the Jabulani design against the earlier 2006 design which had also received criticism of its behaviour in flight. In discussing the mechanics of the balls Rabi Mehta, an aerospace engineer at NASA Ames, described the unpredictable behaviour as "a knuckle-ball effect". He explained that when a seamed ball is struck with little spin it experiences asymmetrical air flow effects as a result of the air close to the surface being affected by those seams. This causes unpredictable movement akin to the knuckleball pitch in baseball.

The speed of the ball is the main factor in its behaviour, but it is also affected by altitude and wind. Where older designs of footballs have a knuckling effect at speeds closer to 30 miles per hour (48 km/h), Mehta predicted that the Jabulani would experience the knuckling effect at the higher speed of 45–50 mph (72–80 km/h) due to its smoother surface. Free-kicks in the goal area tend to be kicked at this speed, making the knuckling effect of the Jabulani relevant to the game.

== See also ==
- Adidas Tango 12
- 2010 FIFA World Cup
- List of FIFA World Cup official match balls

Preceded by +Teamgeist	FIFA World Cup official ball 2010	Succeeded by Brazuca
