= Adidas Teamgeist =

Official match ball for 2006 FIFA World Cup

Adidas +Teamgeist
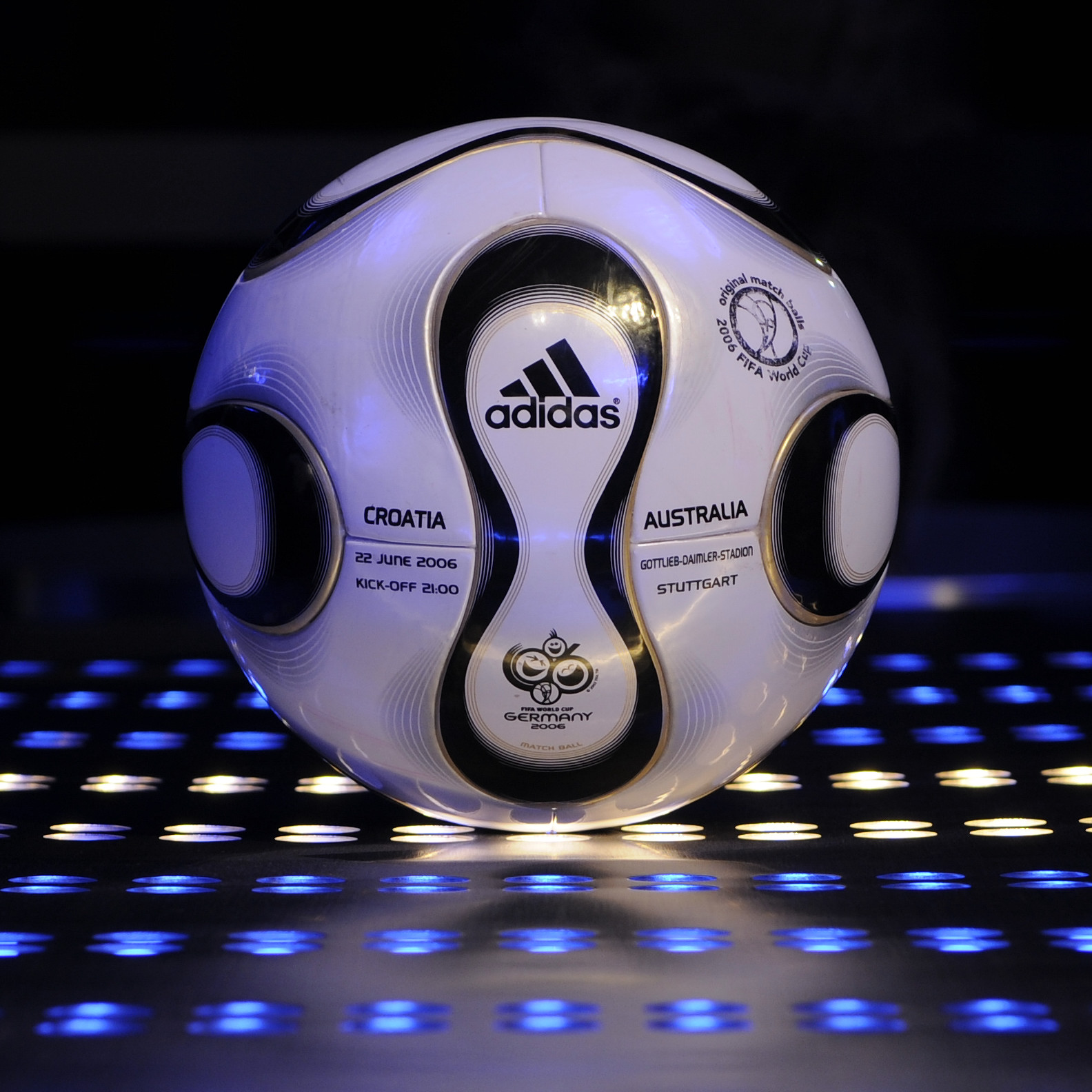
- The Adidas Teamgeist ball used for the Group F match between Croatia and Australia
- Type: Football
- Inventor: Adidas and Molten
- Inception: 2006; 20 years ago
- Manufacturer: Adidas

The Adidas +Teamgeist (German: [ˈtiːmgaɪ̯st], with the plus sign being mute) is a football made by Adidas and developed jointly with Molten Corporation. It was the official match ball for the 2006 FIFA World Cup in Germany. The plus sign in its name was introduced for trademark purposes, since the regular German word Teamgeist, meaning "team spirit", could not be trademarked.

== Design ==
The ball was designed by the Adidas Innovation Team and the Molten Corporation and is made by Adidas, which has provided the balls used in all World Cup matches since the 1970 World Cup when the Telstar was introduced. The +Teamgeist ball differs from previous balls in having just 14 curved panels (making the ball topologically equivalent to a truncated octahedron), rather than the 32 that have been standard since 1970. Like the 32 panel Roteiro which preceded it, the +TeamGeist panels are bonded together, rather than stitched. It is claimed to be rounder and to perform more uniformly regardless of where it is hit, and being almost waterproof, it does not get heavier in wet weather.

== World Cup match balls ==
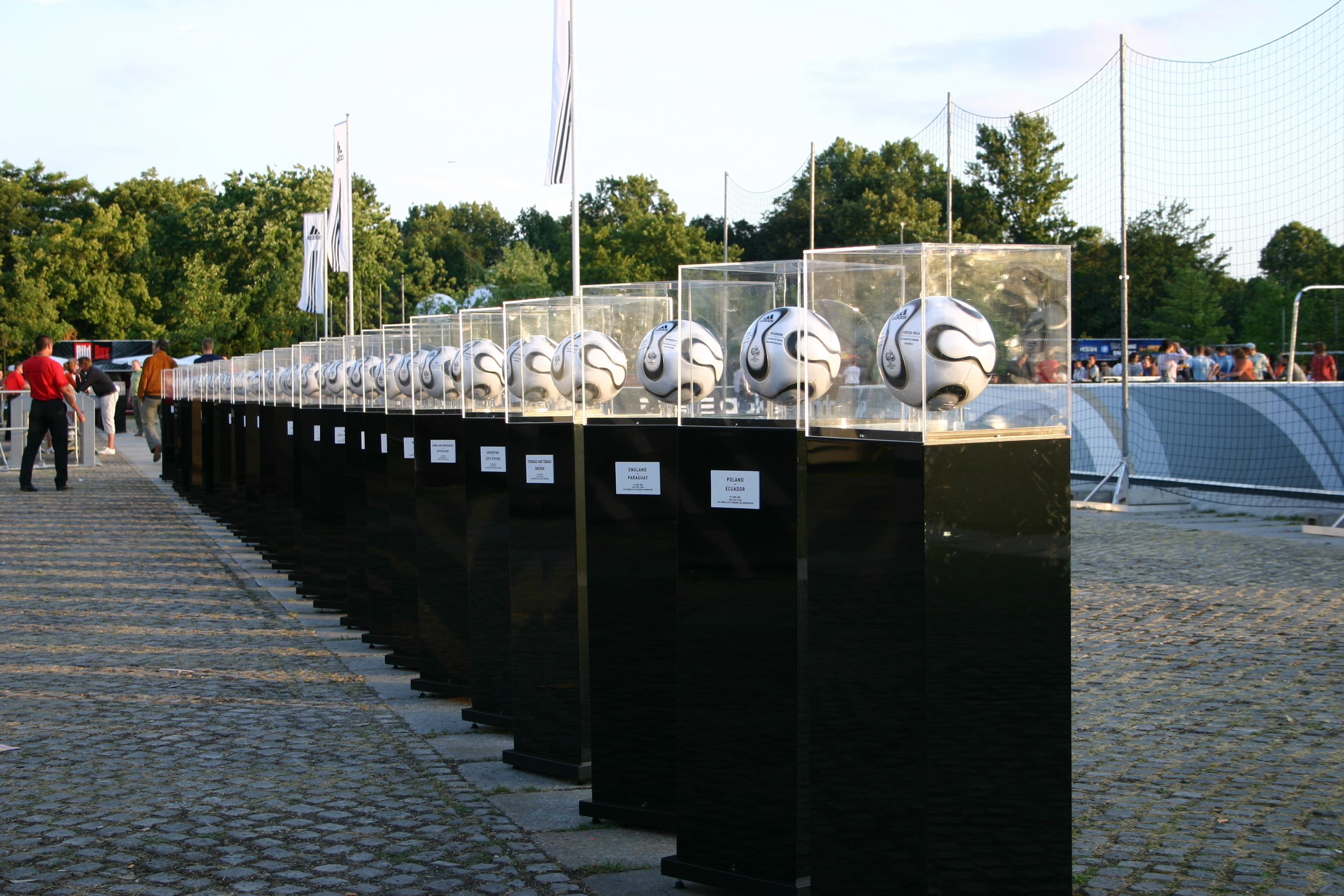
Teamgeist Gallery in Adidas "world of football", Berlin

Each of the 32 qualified federations received 40 match balls for training purposes. Match balls for the 2006 FIFA World Cup were personalized with the name of the stadium, the teams, the match date, and the kick-off time of each individual game, under a protective coating.

A special match ball was used for the final game — the +Teamgeist Berlin. The design is the same as the other match balls, but accented in gold, with black and white details. Both qualified federations (France and Italy) received 20 of these versions for training purposes.

== Technical specification ==
Although it had been planned to include an electronic tracking system in the ball, this was abandoned after a trial at the 2005 Under-17 World Championship in Peru.

	FIFA Approved standard	Teamgeist measurements
Circumference	68.5 – 69.5 cm	69.0 – 69.25 cm
Diameter	≤ 1.5% difference	≤ 1.0% difference
Water absorption	≤ 10% weight increase	≤ 0.1% weight increase
Weight	420 - 445 g	441 - 444 g
Shape and size retention	2000 cycles at 50 km/h (31 mph)	3500 cycles at 50 km/h (31 mph)
Rebound test	≤ 10 cm	≤ 2 cm
Loss of pressure	≤ 20%	≤ 11%

The Teamgeist was the first World Cup ball since 1970 to not have the traditional 32-panel truncated icosahedron design. Instead, the ball is made up of 14 panels, which means that the number of three-panel touch points is reduced by 60% (60 to 24) and the total length of the panel lines falls by over 15% (400.5 cm to 339.3 cm). Building on the introduction of thermal bonding technology in 2004, the Teamgeist ball is the first time Adidas has used this in a World Cup. Loughborough University conducted extensive comparative testing on the ball, along with the Adidas football laboratory in Scheinfeld, Germany.

== Criticism ==
While Johann Vogel and David Beckham, both sponsored by Adidas, and others were reported to be happy with the new ball, it was criticized by many top players before the World Cup. Players such as Brazil's Roberto Carlos and Paul Robinson of England were among the critics of the new ball, claiming it was too light and had a vastly different performance when wet. The ball has fewer seams, reducing air resistance and thus altering flight patterns.

The "Wawa Aba" ball of the Africa Cup of Nations was criticised by the player of the tournament, Hosny Abd Rabo of Egypt, who said that ball was bad for passing.

== Teamgeist 2 ==
The Teamgeist 2 was introduced by Adidas as an update of the ball during the 2007 FIFA Club World Cup in Japan. The ball was then formally introduced in 2008 and was also used in the seven-a-side football tournament at the 2008 Summer Paralympics.

== 2025 Remakes ==
In March 2025 adidas released the remake version of the +Teamgeist 2006 FIFA World Cup match ball in limited numbers, along with the limited edition Adidas Predator football boots in the same colorway with the +Teamgeist match balls.

The modernized version of the +Teamgeist were also being used during the 2024–25 UEFA Nations League second-leg quarter-final match between Spain and The Netherlands. While the colorway of the match balls are the same with the original +Teamgeist, the panels design are derived from the adidas Fussballliebe, the official match ball of the UEFA Euro 2024.

== Variants ==
Adidas has produced multiple variants of the +Teamgeist and Teamgeist 2 for various competitions.

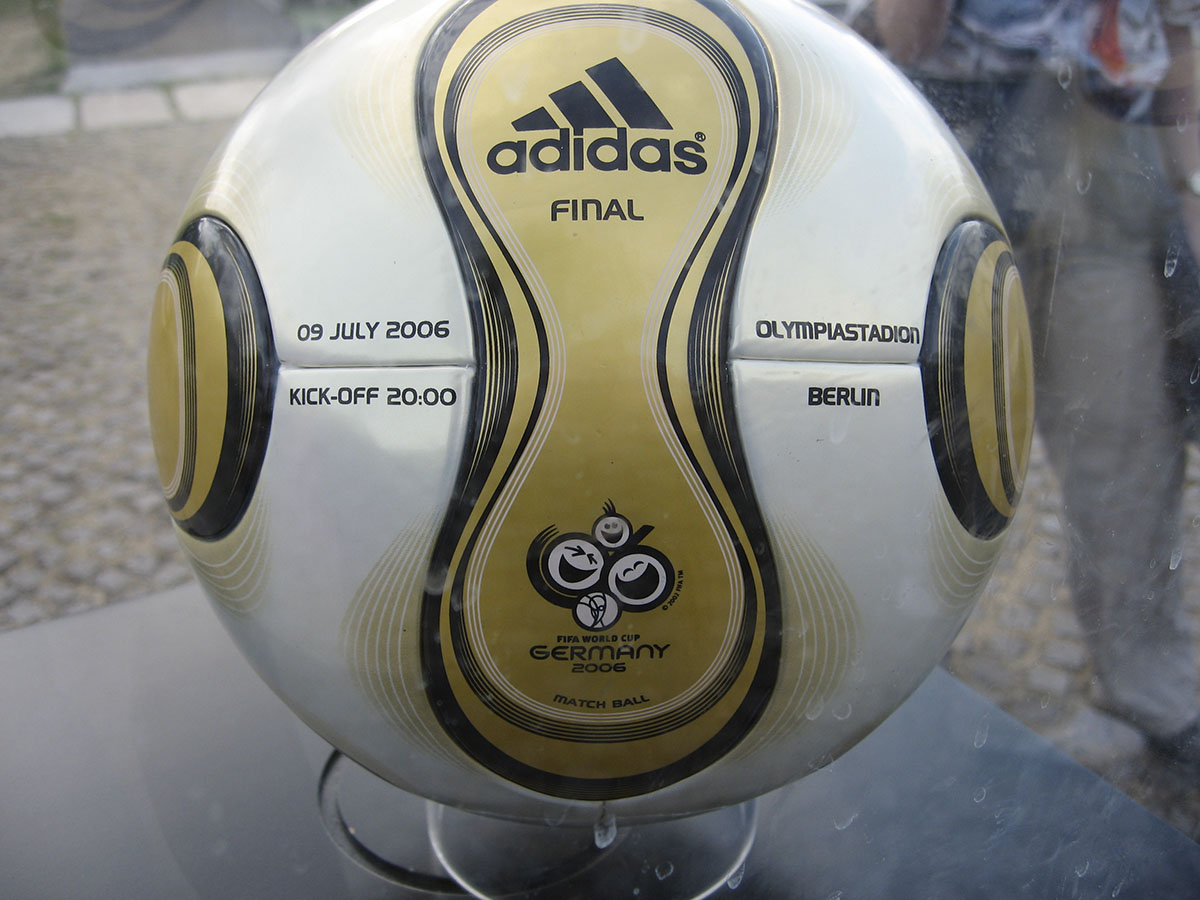
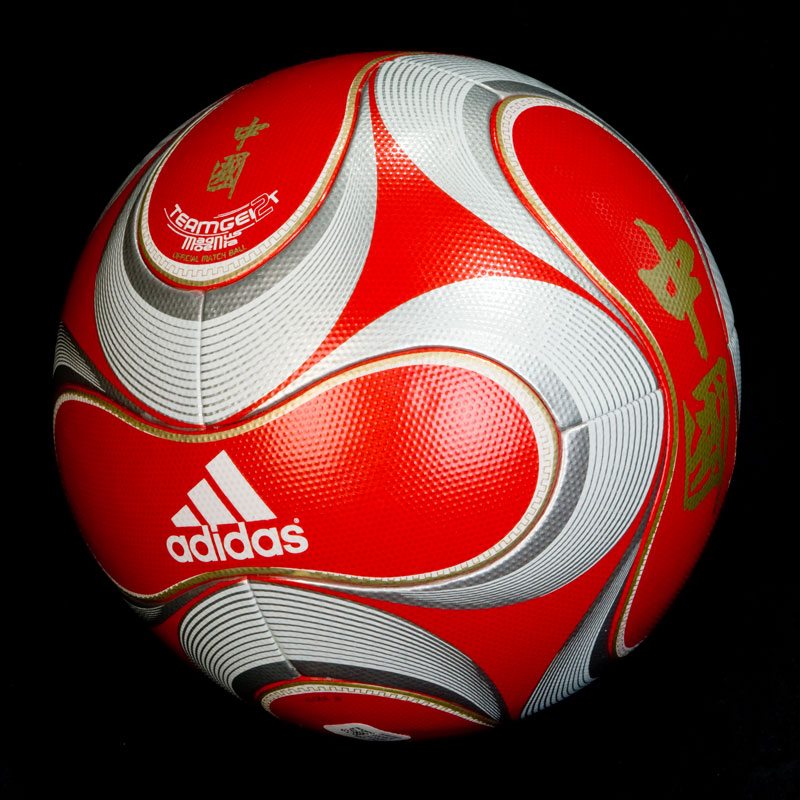
Variations of the Teamgeist: Teamgeist Berlin (left); Teamgei2t Magnus Moenia (right), designed for the 2008 Olympics

Year	Variant name	Competition
2006	Teamgeist	2006 FIFA World Cup
2006	Teamgeist Berlin	2006 FIFA World Cup final
	Teamgeist Blue	
	Teamgeist Red	2006 FIFA Club World Cup
2006	Teamgeist RFEF	2006–07 Copa del Rey
2007	Teamgeist Blue 2007 China	2007 FIFA Women’s World Cup
2007	Teamgeist Red 2007 Canada	2007 FIFA U-20 World Cup
2007	Teamgeist Red 2007 Korea	2007 FIFA U-17 World Cup

Variants of this ball include the Adidas Teamgeist 2 Magnus Moenia, used in the 2008 Olympic Games, as well as the related Adidas Europass used for UEFA Euro 2008.

== See also ==
- Ball (association football)
- Adidas Europass
- List of FIFA World Cup official match balls

Preceded by Fevernova	FIFA World Cup official ball 2006	Succeeded by Jabulani
