= Adidas Roteiro =

Association football ball

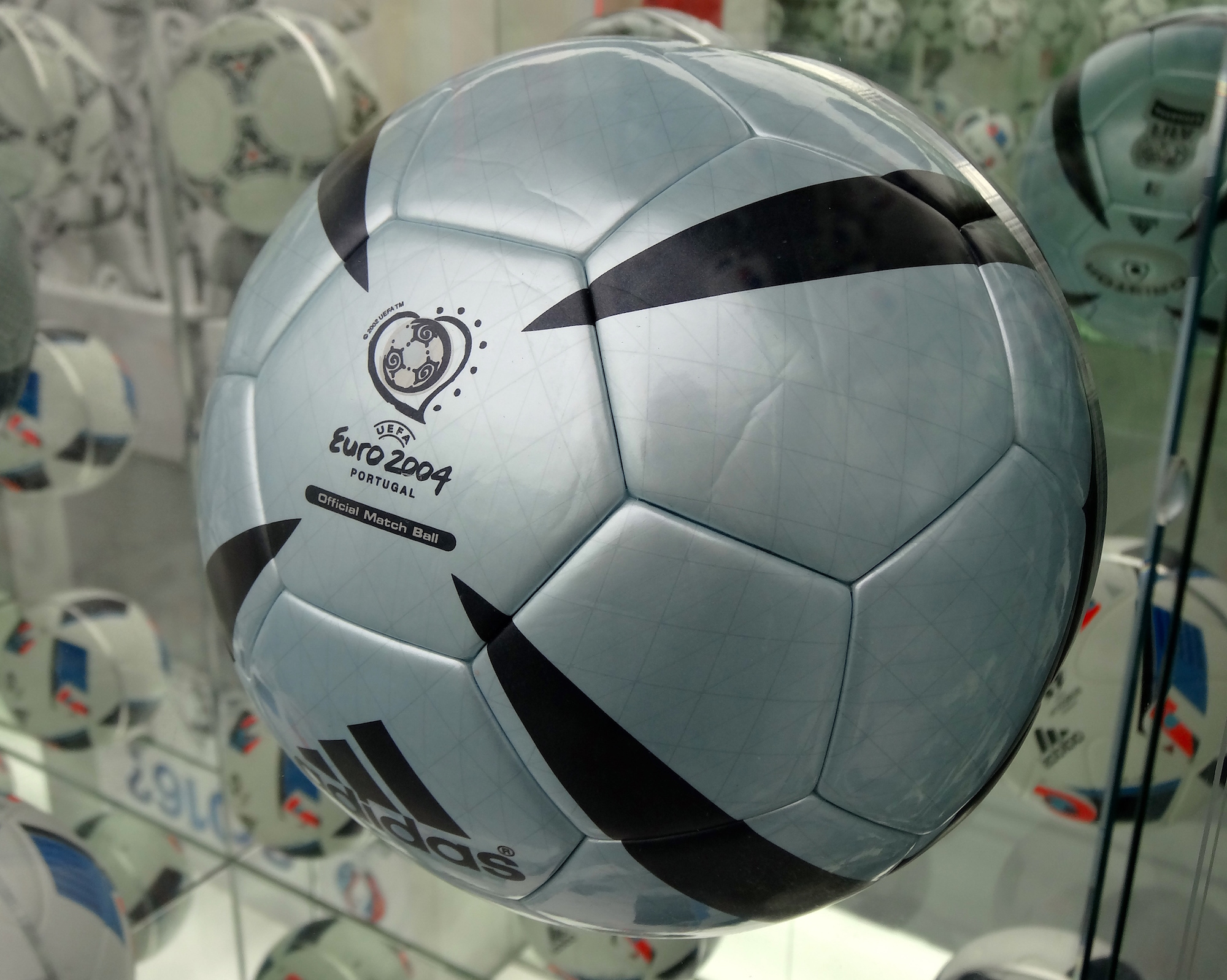
- Type: Football
- Inception: 2004; 22 years ago
- Manufacturer: Adidas

Adidas Roteiro (Portuguese pronunciation: [ʁuˈtɐjɾu]) is a football made by German company Adidas. It was the official match ball of the UEFA Euro 2004 in Portugal and later, was the official match ball for the 2004 AFC Asian Cup held a month later in China. "Roteiro" means "road map" or "navigation chart" in Portuguese and was a reference to the discoveries made by the Portuguese in the 15th and 16th century, in particular Vasco da Gama. It is made by Adidas and it was presented on 1 December 2003 in Lisbon.

For the first time in a major football tournament, every single ball at the Euro 2004 was personalized to each game. The Roteiro balls had inscribed the name of the teams playing, the date, the name of the stadium, and the longitude and latitude of the center spot of the pitch. It was the first ball to feature an innovative thermal-bonding production technique developed by Adidas. Adidas supplied 2,300 balls for games and training sessions for the tournament.

== Technical information ==
- Thermal bonded panel edges. Special adhesive for durability and water resistance. No stitching.
- Panel design: Syntactic PU surface material for maximum abrasion resistance.
- Innovative carcass technology
- High-grade natural latex bladder

Preceded by Adidas Terrestra Silverstream	UEFA European Championship official ball 2004	Succeeded by Adidas Europass
Preceded by Adidas Terrestra Silverstream	AFC Asian Cup official ball 2004	Succeeded by Nike Mercurial Veloci
