= Adidas Europass =

Football by Adidas

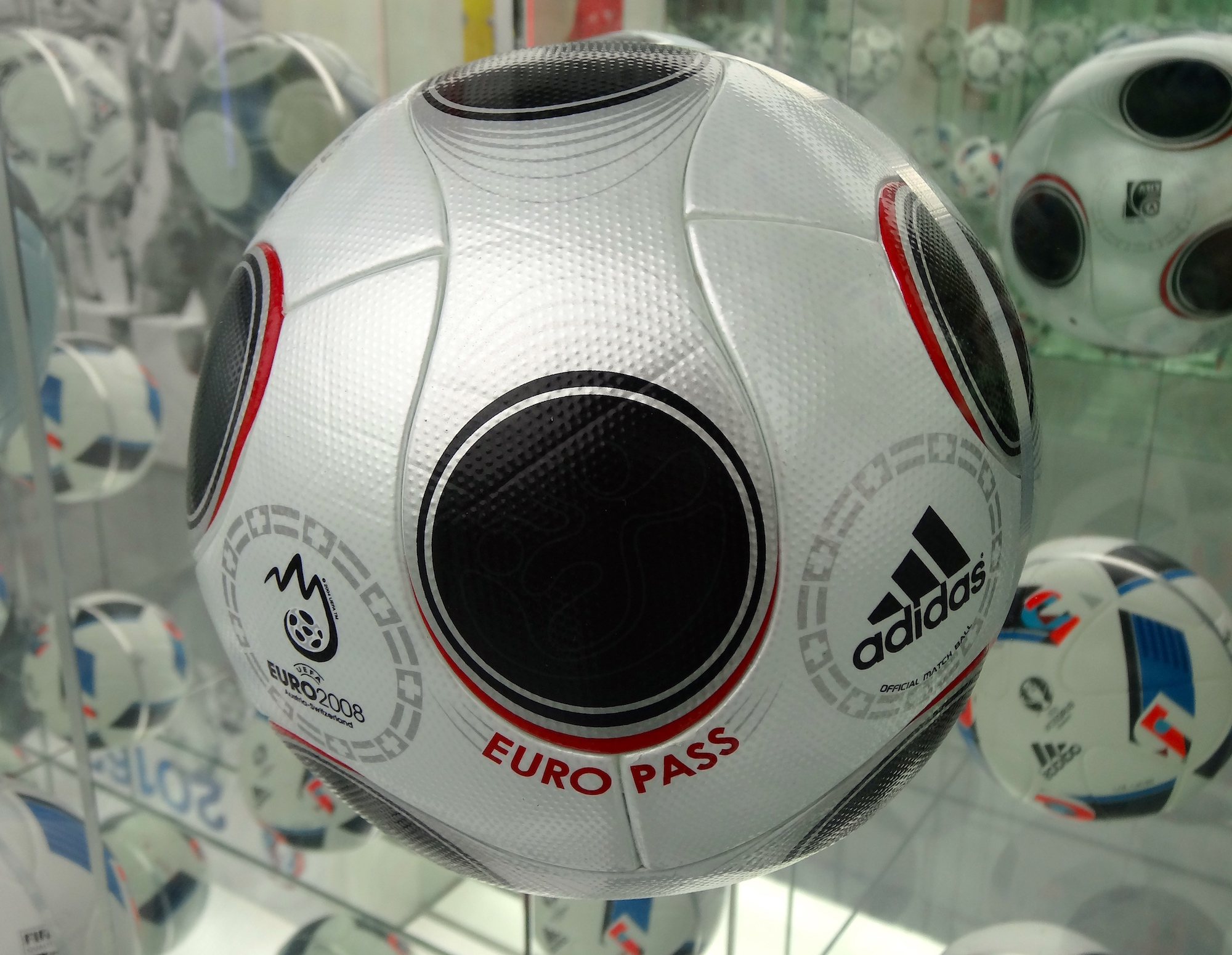
- Inception: 2007; 19 years ago
- Manufacturer: Adidas
- Models: Europass; Europass Gloria; Terrapass

Europass is a football made by Adidas. It was the official match ball for UEFA Euro 2008. The ball was officially presented on 2 December 2007 during the group draw for the final tournament. For the final, a silver version, the "Europass Gloria", was used. The same ball but with different design (depending on competition) was used in UEFA Champions League from 2008 through 2009 and in 2009 UEFA Super Cup and 2009–10 UEFA Europa League.

The Terrapass, similar to Europass ball, was used in the 2009 European Under-21 and Women's European Championship, as well as some international matches.

== Technical information ==
The ball is made of 14 panels instead of the traditional 32 panels. It's an evolution of the ball Teamgeist, used for the 2006 World Cup in Germany but with new PSC (creeps) surface design. The edges are thermally bonded instead of being stitched and a special adhesive is used for durability and water resistance.

== Criticism ==
Majority of the criticism the ball faced came from goalkeepers. Germany's goalkeeper coach, Andreas Köpke, said to reporters, "Basically no one is 100 percent satisfied with this ball." He added, "It is pointless to lament this," adding that his team had tried to make the best of it. "[But] I don't think we will get more goals because the ball swirls."

"I have had a few problems with the official balls, I only started working with them a week ago, but they are very different from the ones used for the 2006 World Cup. During the first half, I went to catch the ball and it started to float a bit," German goalkeeper Jens Lehmann had complained.

Co-host Austria's goalkeeper, Alexander Manninger, as well as Czech goalkeeper Petr Čech, also expressed their dissatisfaction, with the former stating, "This ball is not the keeper's friend."

Italian goalkeepers likewise were not very satisfied with the ball. Gianluigi Buffon said, "Maybe we just have to get used to it. But it won't matter, I'll get the ball anyway." Meanwhile, Marco Amelia told reporters, "It changes direction. To not make a mess trying to stop it, it's better to beat it away."

Adidas replied to all the criticism by saying, "The ball's new surface structure allows players to control and direct it perfectly in all weather conditions." It also pointed out that the ball's new surface texture on the outer skin guaranteed "optimum grip between ball and boot", as well as better grip between glove and ball for goalkeepers.

== See also ==
- Adidas Teamgeist

Preceded by Roteiro	UEFA European Championship official ball 2008	Succeeded by Adidas Tango 12
