= Adidas Nativo =

Brand of association footballs

The Adidas Nativo is a family and brand of association football balls. Used as official match balls of Major League Soccer and MLS All-Star Game, the Nativo balls have had different numbers in their names applied to them to distinguish them in their construction.

Before the adoption of the brand, as official match balls of MLS were used variants of Adidas Teamgeist (2006–2009) and of Adidas Jabulani (2010–2011), while between 2012 and 2014 were used the balls of the line Adidas Prime.

== 2015–2017 ==
From 2015 to 2017 the line of Nativo balls adopted the technology developed with Adidas Brazuca, already used for the last balls of Adidas Prime's line. The first version, Adidas Nativo 1, used a blue and red template (using the colors of US and Canada flags) with the same shape of Adidas Conext 15 balls. For the international day for the fight against breast cancer the MLS used a variant with a pink decoration. Adidas Nativo 2 showed again a blue and red decoration, but it adopted the same template as the balls that replaced the line started with Brazuca, which was first used for Adidas Beau Jeu. For the international day for the fight against breast cancer the MLS used a variant with a pink decoration, while another variant was used as official match ball of 2016 MLS All-Star Game. Adidas Nativo 3 adopted the same template as the balls that replaced the line of Adidas Conext 15, which was first used for Adidas Krasava, and showed the flags of Canada and United States. A variant was used as official match ball of 2017 MLS All-Star Game.

== 2018–2020 ==
Between 2018 and 2020 the line of Nativo balls adopted the same technology of Adidas Telstar 18. Adidas Nativo 4 used the same template of Telstar 18, but with a blue and red decoration. To promote a campaign against pediatric cancer the MLS used also a variant with a yellow decoration, while another variant was used as official match ball of 2018 MLS All-Star Game. The official match ball of 2019 MLS season presented by Adidas was Adidas Nativo Questra, that showed a red and blue variant of Adidas Conext 19 pattern, while the name paid homage to the official match ball of the 1994 FIFA World Cup, tournament held it the United States. To promote a campaign against pediatric cancer the MLS used also a variant with a yellow decoration, while a purple variant was used as official match ball of 2019 MLS All-Star Game. On the occasion of the twenty-fifth anniversary of the foundation of MLS, Adidas presented as the official match ball of 2020 MLS season Adidas Nativo XXV, that showed a green and blue variant of Adidas Uniforia and Adidas Tsubasa pattern. To promote a campaign against pediatric cancer the MLS used also a variant with a yellow decoration. The same type of pattern was also used for Adidas Nativo 21 and Adidas MLS Pro, respectively, the official match balls of 2021 and 2022 MLS season.

== Since 2023 ==
Since 2023 the balls adopted the SpeedShell technology developed for Adidas Al Rihla and its variants. As official match ball of 2023 MLS season Adidas announced Adidas MLS Pro 2023, that proposed again a blue and red pattern for the decoration. A special version branded by Marvel was used as official match ball of 2023 MLS All-Star Game. For 2024 MLS season Adidas announced as official match ball MLS Pro 2024, that showed a multicolored pattern.
