= 2024 MLS All-Star Game =

Soccer exhibition match in Columbus, Ohio, U.S.

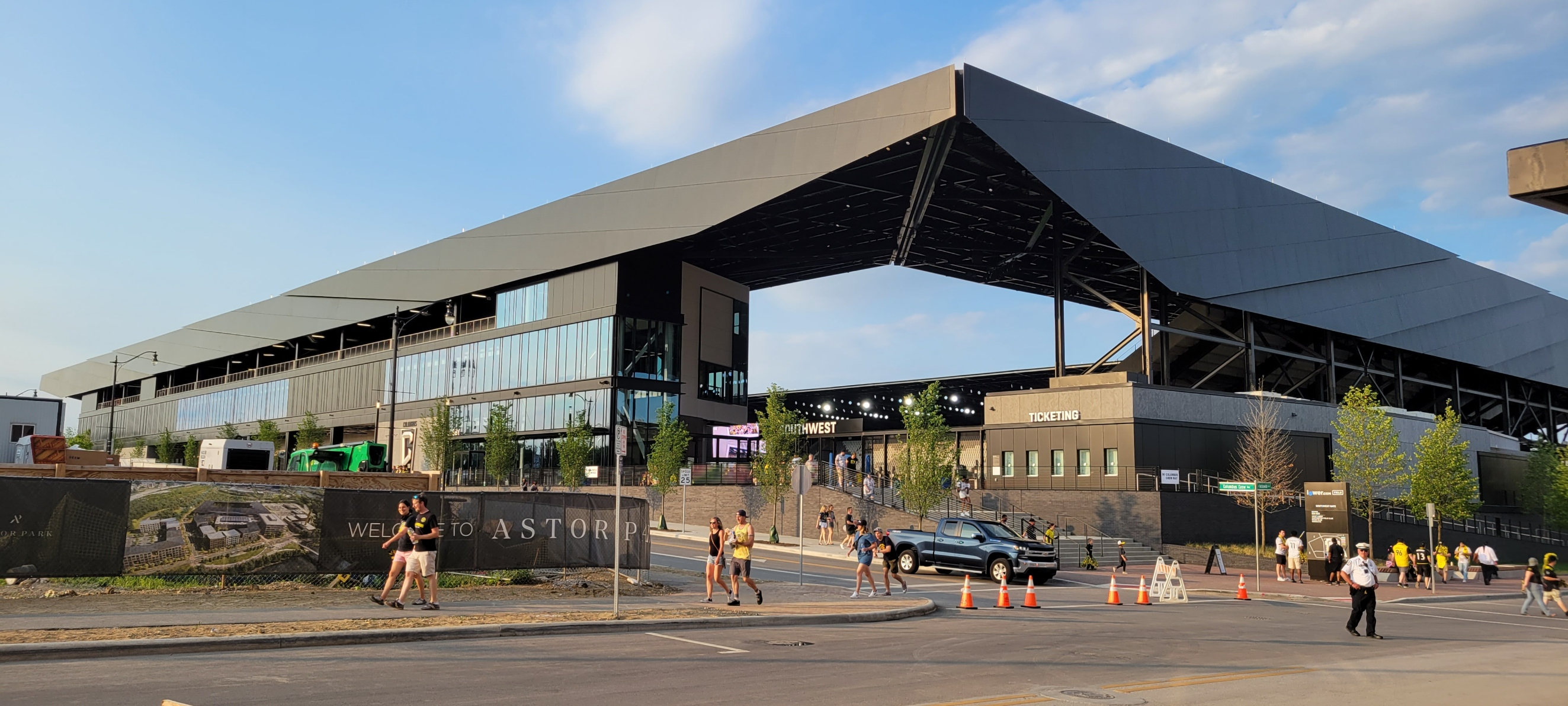
- Lower.com Field hosted the All-Star Game
- Event: 2024 Major League Soccer season
| MLS All-Stars | Liga MX All-Stars |
| (United States Soccer Federation) (Canadian Soccer Association) | (Mexican Football Federation) |
| 1 | 4 |
- Date: July 24, 2024
- Venue: Lower.com Field, Columbus, Ohio, U.S.
- Most Valuable Player: Juan Brunetta (Liga MX All-Stars)
- Referee: Guido Gonzales Jr. (United States)
- Attendance: 20,931

The 2024 Major League Soccer All-Star Game was the 28th annual Major League Soccer All-Star Game, an exhibition soccer match in the United States. It featured all-star squads from Major League Soccer (MLS) and Liga MX of Mexico—the third edition to use the inter-league format. The All-Star Game was played on July 24, 2024, at Lower.com Field in Columbus, Ohio, and won 4–1 by Liga MX. The MLS All-Star Skills Challenge was played the day before at the same venue.

== Background ==
On June 28, 2023, MLS announced that the 2024 MLS All-Star Game would be hosted by the Columbus Crew and played at their home stadium, Lower.com Field in Columbus, Ohio. The 2005 MLS All-Star Game was hosted by the Crew at their previous stadium. The Liga MX All-Stars, representing the top flight league of Mexico, were announced as the 2024 All-Star Game opponents on March 4, 2024. It is the third MLS All-Star Game to feature an inter-league all-star team; the Liga MX All-Stars had previously played in the 2021 and 2022 editions before MLS switched back to a friendly against a European club for the 2023 game. The All-Star Game was played two days before the start of the 2024 Leagues Cup, an international competition featuring all clubs from MLS and Liga MX.

== Pre-match ==
=== Roster selection ===
The MLS All-Star team's 30 players were determined by sixteen selections by host head coach Wilfried Nancy of the Columbus Crew, two players selected by MLS commissioner Don Garber, and twelve selections from an online vote of fans, media personnel, and MLS players. The online vote for players in a 4–1–2–3 formation and one additional slot began on May 29, 2024, and concluded on June 10. Players on the ballot were required to have appeared in at least 50 percent of their club's matches by May 13. Garber selected Houston Dynamo FC midfielder Héctor Herrera and Columbus midfielder Darlington Nagbe.

Real Salt Lake forward Cristian Arango, who was voted onto the roster, was suspended by the league on July 15 for a violation of the MLS anti-harassment policy. Miles Robinson withdrew from the All-Star Game due to his selection for the United States under-23 team at the 2024 Summer Olympics. Real Salt Lake midfielder Diego Luna and Colorado Rapids defender Moïse Bombito were announced as replacement coach selections on July 19. Forwards Gabriel Pec of the LA Galaxy and Petar Musa of FC Dallas were added as coach selections on July 21, after the withdrawal of Inter Miami forwards Lionel Messi and Luis Suárez, who were both injured during the 2024 Copa América. Luciano Acosta of FC Cincinnati, the reigning league MVP, was named captain of the MLS All-Star Team for the second consecutive year.

André Jardine was selected as the manager of the Liga MX All-Stars after winning the Balón de Oro award for Best Head Coach of the Season. His selection of 14 players from the Balón de Oro finalists and 14 additional players was announced on July 17.

== Skills Challenge ==
The MLS All-Star Skills Challenge was held on July 23 at Lower.com Field and comprised events in five fields: shooting, touches, cross-and-volley, passing, and a crossbar challenge. The rosters include ten all-star players, one former "great" player, and female players from the National Women's Soccer League and Liga MX Femenil. The MLS roster includes former player Sacha Kljestan and Diana Ordóñez of the Houston Dash; the Liga MX roster includes former player Luis Hernández and Alicia Cervantes of C.D. Guadalajara Femenil. The Liga MX All-Stars won three of the five events during the Skills Challenge. A single-elimination Goalie Wars tournament was also held and featured four MLS Next Pro goalkeepers; Chituru Odunze of Crown Legacy FC won the team's second consecutive Goalie Wars title.

2024 MLS All-Star Skills Challenge results
| Event | MLS score | Liga MX score |
|---|---|---|
| Shooting | 96 | 158 |
| Touch | 137 | 71 |
| Cross & Volley | 45 | 90 |
| Passing | 2 wins | 1 win |
| Crossbar | Loss | Win |

== Broadcasting ==
The All-Star Game and Skills Challenge were broadcast globally in English, French, and Spanish on MLS Season Pass, an online streaming platform operated by Apple TV with rights to all MLS matches.

== Squads ==
=== MLS All-Stars ===
The initial MLS All-Stars roster was announced on July 1, 2024. The Skills Challenge rosters for both teams were published on July 15. Players from 18 clubs were selected; the most-represented teams on the roster were the Columbus Crew with five players and Inter Miami CF with four players, who all made their All-Star Game debut.

Note: Flags indicate national team as defined under FIFA eligibility rules. Players may hold more than one non-FIFA nationality.
† indicates a player who participated in the MLS All-Star Skills Challenge.

2024 MLS All-Stars roster
| No. | Pos. | Nat. | Player | Club | Selection | App. |
|---|---|---|---|---|---|---|
| 1 | GK | SUI | Roman Bürki † | St. Louis City SC | Coach | 2nd |
| 26 | GK | FRA | Hugo Lloris | Los Angeles FC | Coach | 1st |
| 30 | GK | IDN | Maarten Paes † | FC Dallas | Vote | 1st |
| 10 | DF | ESP | Jordi Alba † | Inter Miami CF | Vote | 1st |
| 64 | DF | CAN | Moïse Bombito † | Colorado Rapids | Coach | 1st |
| 4 | DF | FRA | Rudy Camacho | Columbus Crew | Coach | 1st |
| 15 | DF | USA | Justen Glad | Real Salt Lake | Vote | 1st |
| 22 | DF | GUA | Aaron Herrera | D.C. United | Vote | 1st |
| 13 | DF | BRA | Thiago Martins | New York City FC | Coach | 1st |
| 31 | DF | CPV | Steven Moreira | Columbus Crew | Coach | 1st |
| 23 | DF | ARG | Luca Orellano | FC Cincinnati | Coach | 1st |
| 2 | DF | USA | Keegan Rosenberry | Colorado Rapids | Coach | 2nd |
| 11 | MF | ARG | Luciano Acosta (c) † | FC Cincinnati | Vote | 3rd |
| 5 | MF | ESP | Sergio Busquets † | Inter Miami CF | Vote | 1st |
| 29 | MF | CAN | Mathieu Choinière | CF Montréal | Coach | 2nd |
| 19 | MF | BRA | Evander † | Portland Timbers | Coach | 1st |
| 25 | MF | SCO | Ryan Gauld † | Vancouver Whitecaps FC | Coach | 1st |
| 16 | MF | MEX | Héctor Herrera | Houston Dynamo FC | Commissioner | 2nd |
| 17 | MF | FIN | Robin Lod | Minnesota United FC | Coach | 1st |
| 3 | MF | USA | Diego Luna | Real Salt Lake | Coach | 1st |
| 27 | MF | GER | Hany Mukhtar | Nashville SC | Coach | 3rd |
| 6 | MF | USA | Darlington Nagbe | Columbus Crew | Commissioner | 3rd |
| 7 | MF | ESP | Riqui Puig † | LA Galaxy | Vote | 2nd |
| 20 | FW | BEL | Christian Benteke | D.C. United | Vote | 2nd |
| 8 | FW | ITA | Federico Bernardeschi † | Toronto FC | Coach | 1st |
| 99 | FW | GAB | Denis Bouanga | Los Angeles FC | Coach | 2nd |
| 24 | FW | COL | Cucho Hernández † | Columbus Crew | Coach | 1st |
| 10 | FW | ARG | Lionel Messi | Inter Miami CF | Vote | 1st |
| — | FW | CRO | Petar Musa | FC Dallas | Coach | 1st |
| — | FW | BRA | Gabriel Pec | LA Galaxy | Coach | 1st |
| 21 | FW | URU | Diego Rossi | Columbus Crew | Coach | 3rd |
| 9 | FW | URU | Luis Suárez | Inter Miami CF | Vote | 1st |

=== Liga MX All-Stars ===
The first half of the Liga MX All-Stars roster was announced on June 30, 2024, as part of the Balón de Oro awards. The remaining 16 players were announced on July 15.

Note: Flags indicate national team as defined under FIFA eligibility rules. Players may hold more than one non-FIFA nationality.
† indicates a player who participated in the MLS All-Star Skills Challenge.

2024 Liga MX All-Stars roster
| No. | Pos. | Nat. | Player | Club |
|---|---|---|---|---|
| — | GK | MEX | Luis Malagón † | Club América |
| — | GK | COL | Kevin Mier † | Cruz Azul |
| — | GK | MEX | Fernando Tapia | Tigres UANL |
| — | DF | MEX | Jesús Alberto Angulo | Tigres UANL |
| — | DF | MEX | Brian García | Deportivo Toluca |
| — | DF | MEX | Bryan González | C.F. Pachuca |
| — | DF | MEX | Alan Mozo | C.D. Guadalajara |
| — | DF | MEX | Jesús Orozco | C.D. Guadalajara |
| — | DF | MEX | Alexis Peña | Club Necaxa |
| — | DF | ARG | Gonzalo Piovi † | Cruz Azul |
| — | DF | ARG | Guido Pizarro | Tigres UANL |
| — | DF | URU | Juan Manuel Sanabria | Atlético San Luis |
| — | MF | MEX | Roberto Alvarado † | C.D. Guadalajara |
| — | MF | MEX | Alán Bautista | C.F. Pachuca |
| — | MF | ARG | Germán Berterame | C.F. Monterrey |
| — | MF | ARG | Juan Brunetta † | Tigres UANL |
| — | MF | ESP | Sergio Canales † | C.F. Monterrey |
| — | MF | COL | Nelson Deossa | C.F. Pachuca |
| — | MF | NED | Javairô Dilrosun | Club América |
| — | MF | MEX | Jonathan dos Santos † | Club América |
| — | MF | BRA | Rodrigo Dourado | Atlético San Luis |
| — | MF | ESP | Álvaro Fidalgo | Club América |
| — | MF | MEX | Andrés Guardado † | Club León |
| — | MF | MEX | César Huerta † | Pumas UNAM |
| — | MF | MAR | Oussama Idrissi | C.F. Pachuca |
| — | MF | ARG | Maximiliano Meza | C.F. Monterrey |
| — | MF | MEX | Carlos Rodríguez | Cruz Azul |
| — | FW | FRA | Andre-Pierre Gignac | Tigres UANL |
| — | FW | MEX | Guillermo Martínez | Pumas UNAM |
| — | FW | VEN | Salomón Rondón † | C.F. Pachuca |

== Match ==
2024 MLS All-Star Game
July 24, 2024
8:30 p.m. EDT

| MLS All-Stars (United States Soccer Federation) (Canadian Soccer Association) | 1–4 | (Mexican Football Federation) Liga MX All-Stars |
|---|---|---|
| Hernández 17' | Report | Berterame 16'; Idrissi 41'; Brunetta 68'; Meza 69' |

Lower.com Field, Columbus, Ohio
Attendance: 20,931
Referee: Guido Gonzales Jr. (United States)
