= Michael Parkhurst =

American soccer player (born 1984)

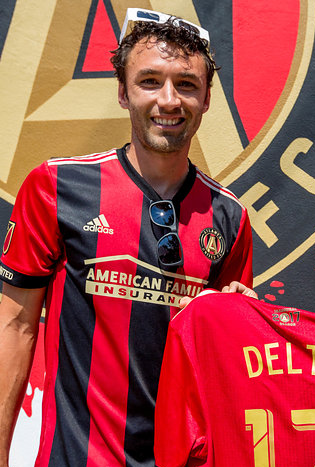
- Parkhurst in 2017

Personal information
- Full name: Michael Finlay Parkhurst
- Date of birth: January 24, 1984 (age 42)
- Place of birth: Providence, Rhode Island, United States
- Height: 5 ft 11 in (1.80 m)
- Position: Defender

College career
Years	Team	Apps	(Gls)
2002–2004	Wake Forest Demon Deacons	41	(0)

Senior career*
Years	Team	Apps	(Gls)
2003	Bradenton Academics	10	(2)
2005–2008	New England Revolution	115	(1)
2008–2012	Nordsjælland	107	(3)
2013–2014	FC Augsburg	2	(0)
2014–2016	Columbus Crew	100	(0)
2017–2019	Atlanta United	86	(0)
Total		420	(6)

International career^{‡}
2008	United States Olympic (O.P.)	5	(0)
2007–2014	United States	25	(0)
Medal record
Men's soccer
Representing United States
CONCACAF Gold Cup
Winner	2007 United States
Runner-up	2009 United States
Winner	2013 United States
- * Club domestic league appearances and goals as of October 6, 2019 ‡ National team caps and goals as of April 3, 2014

Michael Finlay Parkhurst (born January 24, 1984) is an American former soccer player who played as a defender. The 2005 MLS Rookie of the Year and 2007 MLS Defender of the Year Award, Parkhurst was capable of playing both as a center back and right back. He played for the United States national team, including being a member of three CONCACAF Gold Cup squads and participating in the 2008 Summer Olympics. Parkhurst is a co-founder of USL Championship club Rhode Island FC.

== Youth and college ==
Born in Providence, Rhode Island, Parkhurst attended the Bradenton Soccer Academy in Florida. He played college soccer at Wake Forest University for the Demon Deacons from 2002 to 2004, where he is "considered one of Wake Forest’s greatest defensive players." He started all sixty-two games the team played during his tenure, scoring once. Parkhurst was named a three time All-ACC selection, a second-team All-American as a sophomore and junior and graduated from the university with a degree in history. He then signed a Generation adidas contract with MLS following the 2004 season.

== Professional career ==
=== New England Revolution ===
Parkhurst, who grew up in Rhode Island and played for CLCF Soccer and Bayside United, was in attendance at the inaugural home game for the New England Revolution, in 1996. Nine years later, on January 14, 2005, he was selected ninth overall in the 2005 MLS SuperDraft by his hometown Revolution. He was ever-present for the Revs in his first season and was named MLS Rookie of the Year.

He scored his first career MLS goal on October 20, 2007, in a 2–2 draw between the Revolution and Toronto FC. The goal was scored from sixty yards out, having caught Toronto's keeper Kenny Stamatopoulos off-guard.

Parkhurst won the MLS Defender of the Year Award in 2007, the MLS Fair Play Award in 2007 and 2008 and was also twice named the MLS Humanitarian of the Year in 2006 and 2008.

=== F.C. Nordsjælland ===
After his contract with the Revolution expired after the 2008 season, Parkhurst signed a three-year contract with Danish Superliga side Nordsjælland on December 9, 2008, as a free agent. March 1, 2009, Parkhurst made his FCN league debut in a 1–1 away draw against Vejle.

2009–10 season, with the arrival of Andreas Bjelland and injury to Henrik Kildentoft, Parkhurst was inserted into a variety of new positions, including full back and center midfielder, becoming adept at playing at right back. Parkhurst would help the Wild Tigers to win the Danish Cup, the club's first silverware in their history, and his first trophy in Denmark.

The following season, Parkhurst was hampered by numerous injury setbacks throughout the campaign, eventually losing his place to Jores Okore. He would make his return in time for Nordsjælland's Danish Cup final, winning the cup with a 3–2 victory over F.C. Midtjylland, lifting the trophy for the second consecutive year.

With less than a year remaining on his contract, there was speculation on Michael Parkhurst's future at FCN at the start of the 2011–12 season, with the emergence of Bjelland and Okore's partnership in central defense, Parkhurst was forced to play out of position, often at right back. Helping the club to their best ever start to a season, ending the winter break in December 2011 at a club record second in the league, Parkhurst put rumors to rest when he signed a one-year contract extension with F.C. Nordsjælland, despite financially better offers from other clubs. Michael Parkhust later this season helped F.C. Nordsjælland win the Danish Superliga for the first time in club history, securing the team automatic qualification for 2012–13 season's Champions League group stage.

Parkhurst featured in every minute of Nordsjælland's 2012-2013 UEFA Champions League campaign against Shakhtar Donetsk, Chelsea, and Juventus.

=== Augsburg ===
On December 19, 2012, it was announced that Parkhurst joined FC Augsburg on a free transfer. The struggling Bundesliga side finished 15th for the 2012–13 season. He played his first competitive match in Germany on February 10, 2013 – a 1–1 draw at home against 1. FSV Mainz 05.

=== Columbus Crew SC ===
The MLS rights to Parkhurst were traded by New England to Columbus Crew SC on January 12, 2014, in exchange for the Crew's first-round selection in the 2014 MLS SuperDraft and allocation money. Parkhurst made 33 appearances in his first season with Columbus and was named captain of the club. In summer 2014, Parkhurst became the first Columbus player in four years named to the MLS All-Star Team.

=== Atlanta United FC ===
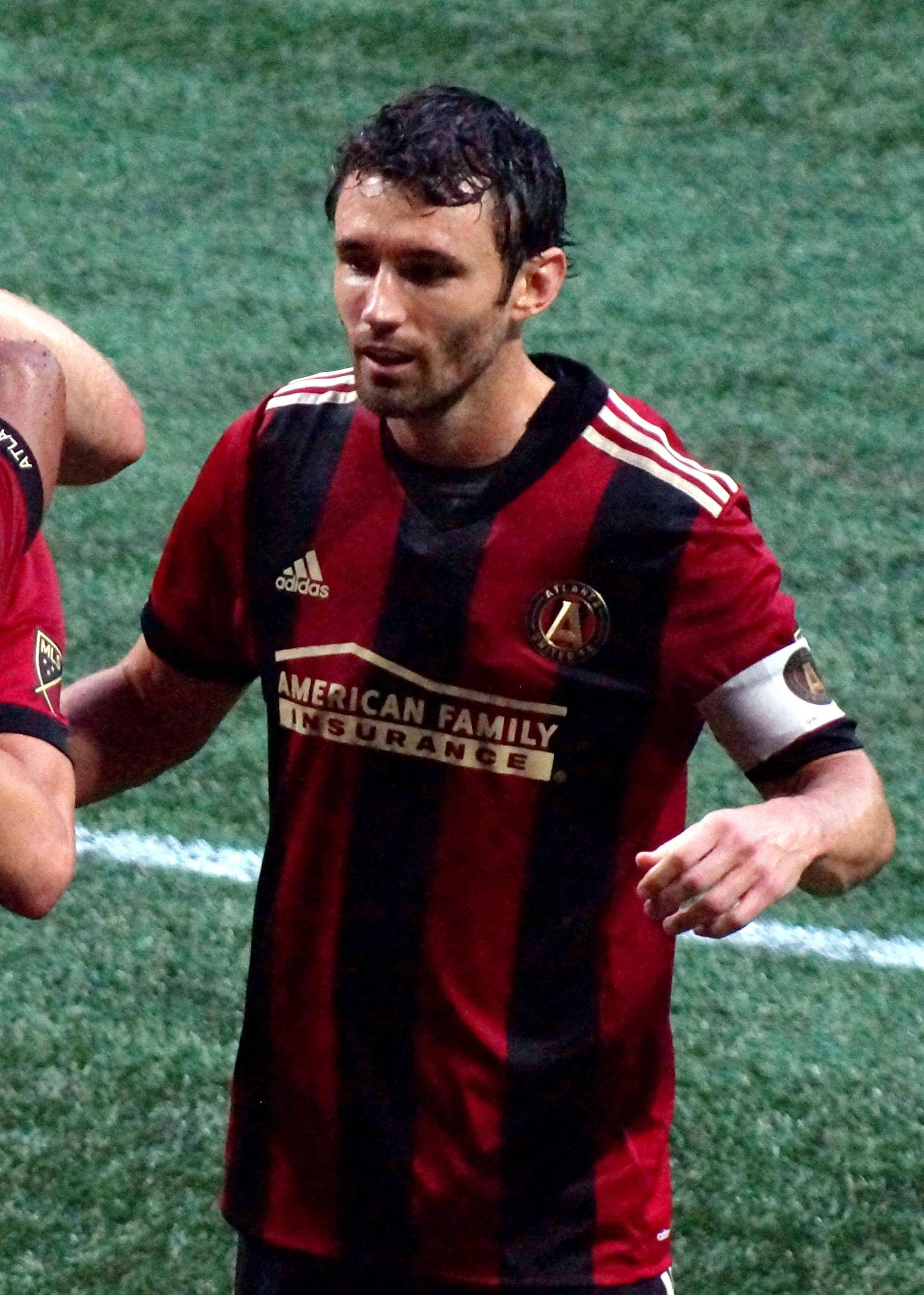
Michael Parkhurst playing for Atlanta United on June 2, 2018

On December 11, 2016, Parkhurst was traded to Atlanta United FC in exchange for General Allocation Money.

Parkhurst captained Atlanta to their first MLS Cup victory in 2018, which broke his personal cup drought after four previous finals.

On September 23, 2019, Parkhurst announced his intention to retire as a professional player at the end of the 2019 season.

== International career ==
Parkhurst is an Irish-American and thus holds an Irish passport. He had declared that he would be willing to play for the Irish national team if his American ambitions never came to fruition. Parkhurst was called up by the United States national team for the 2007 Gold Cup, and the 2013 Gold Cup. He earned his first cap against Trinidad and Tobago on June 9, 2007, thus eliminating any further possibility of playing for the Republic of Ireland. He's been included in many friendlies for the U.S. under Jürgen Klinsmann. He was included on Klinsmann's 30-man preliminary roster for the 2014 FIFA World Cup.

== Post retirement ==
Following his retirement in 2019, Parkhurst went on to co-found the USL Championship club Rhode Island FC alongside Brett M. Johnson. The club played their inaugural season in 2024.

In 2021, he founded Beyond Goals Mentoring alongside former teammate Greg Garza. The organization was created to provide personalized guidance for youth soccer players.

== Personal life ==
Parkhurst is of Irish descent and is a citizen of both the United States and Ireland. Parkhurst father Charles Michael Finlay, was born in County Monaghan, Ireland. His father’s parents died during his youth leading to him being adopted by the Parkhurst family in Rhode Island, who were related to Charles' mother by marriage.

== Career statistics ==
=== Club ===
As of December 8, 2018

Appearances and goals by club, season and competition
Club	Season	League			Playoffs (Note: Appearances in the MLS Cup Playoffs)		Cup (Note: Includes the U.S. Open Cup and Danish Cup)		Continental		Total	
Club	Season	Division	Apps	Goals	Apps	Goals	Apps	Goals	Apps	Goals	Apps	Goals
Bradenton Academics	2003	PDL	10	2	–		1	0	–		11	2
New England Revolution	2005	MLS	32	0	4	0	0	0	–		36	0
New England Revolution	2006	MLS	30	0	4	0	2	0	0	0	36	0
New England Revolution	2007	MLS	25	1	4	0	3	0	–		32	1
New England Revolution	2008	MLS	28	0	2	0	0	0	4 (Note: Three appearances in the North American SuperLiga, one appearance in the CONCACAF Champions League)	0	34	0
New England Revolution	Total		115	1	14	0	5	0	4	0	138	1
Nordsjælland	2008–09	Superliga	16	0	–		0	0	0	0	16	0
Nordsjælland	2009–10	Superliga	23	0	–		3	0	–		26	0
Nordsjælland	2010–11	Superliga	22	0	–		2	0	2 (Note: Appearances in the UEFA Europa League)	0	26	0
Nordsjælland	2011–12	Superliga	30	1	–		2	0	2	0	34	1
Nordsjælland	2012–13	Superliga	16	2	–		0	0	6 (Note: Appearances in the UEFA Champions League)	0	22	2
Nordsjælland	Total		107	3	0	0	7	0	10	0	124	3
FC Augsburg	2012–13	Bundesliga	2	0	–		0	0	–		2	0
FC Augsburg	2013–14	Bundesliga	0	0	–		0	0	–		0	0
FC Augsburg	Total		2	0	0	0	0	0	0	0	2	0
Columbus Crew	2014	MLS	33	0	2	0	2	0	–		37	0
Columbus Crew	2015	MLS	33	0	5	0	0	0	–		38	0
Columbus Crew	2016	MLS	34	0	–		2	0	–		36	0
Columbus Crew	Total		100	0	7	0	4	0	0	0	111	0
Atlanta United	2017	MLS	33	0	1	0	0	0	–		34	0
Atlanta United	2018	MLS	33	0	5	0	0	0	–		38	0
Atlanta United	2019	MLS	18	0	2	0	4	0	-		24	0
Atlanta United	Total		84	0	8	0	0	0	0	0	96	0
Career total			400	6	27	0	17	0	14	0	458	6

=== International ===
As of December 13, 2014

Appearances and goals by national team and year
National team	Year	Apps	Goals
United States	2007	2	0
United States	2008	2	0
United States	2009	4	0
United States	2010	1	0
United States	2011	0	0
United States	2012	6	0
United States	2013	8	0
United States	2014	2	0
Total		25	0

== Honors ==
New England Revolution

- Eastern Conference (regular season): 2005; runner-up 2006, 2007
- Eastern Conference (playoffs): 2005, 2006, 2007
- U.S. Open Cup: 2007

F.C. Nordsjælland

- Danish Superliga: 2011–12
- Danish Cup: 2009–10, 2010–11

Columbus Crew

- Eastern Conference (regular season) runner-up: 2015
- Eastern Conference (playoffs): 2015

Atlanta United

- MLS Cup: 2018
- Campeones Cup: 2019
- U.S. Open Cup: 2019

United States

- CONCACAF Gold Cup: 2007, 2013

Individual

- ACC Defensive Player of the Year: 2004
- MLS Rookie of the Year: 2005
- MLS Fair Play Award: 2007, 2008, 2014
- MLS Humanitarian of the Year: 2006
- MLS Defender of the Year: 2007
- MLS Best XI: 2007
- MLS All-Star Team (6): 2005, 2007, 2008, 2014, 2017, 2018
- Wake Forest Sports Hall of Fame: 2020

Sporting positions
Preceded by Federico Higuaín	Columbus Crew SC captain 2014–2016	Succeeded by Wil Trapp
