= Ricardo Valenzuela =

Ricardo Valenzuela may refer to:

- Ritchie Valens (1941–1959), American singer, songwriter and guitarist
- Ricardo Valenzuela (referee) (born 1964), American former football (soccer) referee
