= 2008 MLS All-Star Game =

Soccer game played in Toronto, Ontario

Pepsi 2008 MLS All-Star Game
- Event: MLS All-Stars
MLS All-Stars	West Ham United
(United States) (Canada)	(England)
3	2
- Date: July 24, 2008
- Venue: BMO Field, Toronto, Ontario
- Man of the Match: Cuauhtémoc Blanco (MLS All-Stars)
- Referee: Mauricio Navarro (Canada)
- Attendance: 20,844
- Weather: Partly cloudy, 22 °C (72 °F)

The 2008 Major League Soccer All-Star Game was the 13th annual MLS All-Star Game. The MLS All-Stars faced West Ham United of the English Premier League. The game was played on July 24, 2008, with the MLS winning 3–2. New England Revolution coach Steve Nicol coached the All-Stars. The motto for the 2008 MLS All-Star Game is "Major League Soccer Takes on the World." Chicago Fire's Cuauhtémoc Blanco was named MVP.

== Host venue ==
MLS Commissioner Don Garber awarded the 2008 All-Star Game to Toronto, Ontario in 2007 on the eve of the 2007 MLS All-Star Game. The game was played in the new soccer-specific stadium, BMO Field and was the first MLS All-Star Game held in Canada. BMO Field is home to the MLS' 13th franchise, Toronto FC.

== West Ham United ==
On April 4, 2008, the Major League Soccer website announced that Premier League club West Ham United would be the fifth international opponent for the marquee event. Founded in 1895, the east London club was originally called Thames Ironworks FC but switched to West Ham United five years later and has been playing at the Boleyn Ground since 1904. West Ham has forged a reputation of cultivating some of the England's top players, such as Frank Lampard, Michael Carrick, Rio Ferdinand, and Joe Cole, giving rise to its frequent reference as The Academy of Football.

== MLS All-Stars ==
=== Voting ===
Major League Soccer released an official ballot to decide the players called to represent the league in the All-Star game. A four-tier voting system determined the First XI players selected for the game. The online fan balloting program comprised 25% of the total vote, with coaches and general managers (25%), players (25%), and media (25%) combining for the remaining 75% percent of the vote. The combined vote of the four groups determined the MLS First XI.

== 2008 All-Star Game Squads ==
=== Major League Soccer ===
Major League Soccer and Toronto FC, hosts of the 2008 Pepsi MLS All-Star Game, unveiled the MLS All-Star First XI in a press conference aired live exclusively on MLSnet.com from BMO Field on Thursday, July 10 at 11 am ET. In addition to the First XI, Commissioner Don Garber picked two more players for the All-Star team, and coach Steve Nicol received five picks on July 15, 2008.

After the U.S. U-23 Olympic Team roster was announced, three additional picks were awarded to Steve Nicol on Thursday, July 17 to replace Michael Parkhurst, Sacha Kljestan, and Robbie Rogers. The additions included 2006 MLS Rookie of the Year Jonathan Bornstein, veteran Steve Ralston, and Colombian Juan Toja, who scored a goal in last year's All-Star Game.

As of July 19, 2008. Players in bold denotes First XI status. Note: Flags indicate national team as defined under FIFA eligibility rules; some limited exceptions apply. Players may hold more than one non-FIFA nationality.

No.	Pos.	Nation	Player
1	GK	USA	**Matt Reis**
2	DF	USA	**Frankie Hejduk**
5	MF	ARG	Christian Gómez ~
7	MF	USA	Steve Ralston ~
8	MF	COL	Juan Toja ~
9	FW	COL	Juan Pablo Ángel ~
10	FW	USA	**Landon Donovan**
11	DF	CAN	Jim Brennan ~
12	DF	USA	**Jimmy Conrad**
13	DF	USA	Jonathan Bornstein ~
14	MF	CAN	Dwayne De Rosario †
17	FW	USA	Edson Buddle †
18	GK	CAN	Pat Onstad ~
21	MF	GRN	**Shalrie Joseph**

No.	Pos.	Nation	Player
23	MF	ENG	**David Beckham**
25	MF	USA	Pablo Mastroeni ~
33	FW	USA	**Kenny Cooper**
70	MF	MEX	**Cuauhtémoc Blanco**
71	FW	ARG	Guillermo Barros Schelotto ♦
72	GK	USA	Jon Busch ♦
73	FW	USA	Brian Ching ♦
74	MF	USA	Maurice Edu ♦
75	FW	BRA	Luciano Emilio ♦
76	MF	USA	**Sacha Kljestan** ♦
77	DF	USA	**Michael Parkhurst** ♦
78	MF	USA	**Robbie Rogers** ♦
80	DF	CRC	Gonzalo Segares ♦
81	MF	MLI	Bakary Soumare ♦

~ – Players selected by coach

† – "Commissioner's Picks"

♦ – Inactive

- **MLS All-Star Head Coach** – Steve Nicol

=== West Ham United ===
As of May 13, 2008. Note: Flags indicate national team as defined under FIFA eligibility rules; some limited exceptions apply. Players may hold more than one non-FIFA nationality.

No.	Pos.	Nation	Player
1	GK	ENG	Robert Green
2	DF	AUS	Lucas Neill (captain)
3	DF	NIR	George McCartney
4	DF	WAL	Daniel Gabbidon
5	DF	ENG	Anton Ferdinand
6	DF	ENG	Matthew Upson
7	MF	SWE	Freddie Ljungberg
8	MF	ENG	Scott Parker
9	FW	ENG	Dean Ashton
10	FW	WAL	Craig Bellamy
11	MF	ENG	Matthew Etherington
12	FW	ENG	Carlton Cole
14	DF	GHA	John Paintsil
16	MF	ENG	Mark Noble
17	MF	ENG	Hayden Mullins
18	DF	USA	Jonathan Spector

No.	Pos.	Nation	Player
19	DF	WAL	James Collins
20	MF	FRA	Julien Faubert
21	GK	ENG	Richard Wright
22	MF	ENG	Tony Stokes
23	GK	ENG	James Walker
25	FW	ENG	Bobby Zamora
26	MF	SCO	Nigel Quashie
27	DF	ENG	Calum Davenport
28	MF	ENG	Kyel Reid
29	MF	ENG	Lee Bowyer
30	DF	ENG	James Tomkins
32	MF	ENG	Kieron Dyer
34	MF	POR	Luís Boa Morte
35	DF	ISL	Hólmar Örn Eyjólfsson
39	MF	WAL	Jack Collison
40	FW	ENG	Freddie Sears

== Match details ==
2008 MLS All-Star Game
July 24, 2008
7:25 p.m. EDT

MLS All-Stars (United States) (Canada)	3–2	(England) West Ham United
Gómez 27'; Blanco 45'; De Rosario 70' (pen.)	Report	Ashton 26', 67'

BMO Field, Toronto, Ontario
Attendance: 20,844
Referee: Mauricio Navarro (Canada)

MLS All-Stars	West Ham United

GK	1	(United States) Matt Reis		(substituted off) 70'
DF	2	(United States) Frankie Hejduk	(yellow card) 56'	(substituted off) 88'
DF	12	(United States) Jimmy Conrad (c)	(yellow card) 82'
DF	13	(United States) Jonathan Bornstein	(yellow card) 52'	(substituted off) 88'
MF	5	(Argentina) Christian Gómez		(substituted off) 59'
MF	8	(Colombia) Juan Toja		(substituted off) 59'
MF	21	(Grenada) Shalrie Joseph
MF	23	(England) David Beckham
MF	25	(United States) Pablo Mastroeni
FW	33	(United States) Kenny Cooper		(substituted off) 46'
FW	70	(Mexico) Cuauhtémoc Blanco
Substitutes:
GK	18	(Canada) Pat Onstad		(substituted on) 70'
DF	11	(Canada) Jim Brennan		(substituted on) 59'
MF	7	(United States) Steve Ralston		(substituted on) 88'
MF	14	(Canada) Dwayne De Rosario		(substituted on) 59'
FW	9	(Colombia) Juan Pablo Ángel		(substituted on) 46'
FW	10	(United States) Landon Donovan		(substituted on) 46'
FW	17	(United States) Edson Buddle		(substituted on) 88'
Manager:
(Scotland) Steve Nicol

GK	1	(England) Robert Green
DF	2	(Australia) Lucas Neill (c)
DF	5	(England) Anton Ferdinand
DF	27	(England) Calum Davenport
DF	40	(England) Joe Widdowson
MF	8	(England) Scott Parker	(yellow card) 45+1'
MF	11	(England) Matthew Etherington		(substituted off) 46'
MF	17	(England) Hayden Mullins		(substituted off) 65'
MF	20	(France) Julien Faubert		(substituted off) 75'
FW	9	(England) Dean Ashton		(substituted off) 80'
FW	12	(England) Carlton Cole		(substituted off) 90+1'
Substitutes:
GK	23	(England) James Walker
DF	45	(England) Jordan Spence
MF	13	(Portugal) Luís Boa Morte		(substituted on) 46'
MF	22	(England) Tony Stokes		(substituted on) 90+1'
MF	28	(England) Kyel Reid		(substituted on) 80'
MF	31	(Wales) Jack Collison		(substituted on) 92'
MF	46	(England) Junior Stanislas		(substituted on) 75'
Manager:
(England) Alan Curbishley

Man of the Match:
(Mexico) Cuauhtémoc Blanco

Assistant referees:
(Canada) Héctor Vergara
(United States) Greg Barkey
Fourth official:
(United States) Mark Geiger

== Notes ==
- The 2008 Major League Soccer All-Star Game was the first to be played in Canada.
- For the first time Pepsi was the official sponsor of the All-Star Game. Previously, Sierra Mist, a Pepsi brand, was the advertised sponsor.
- This was the fifth time that the league's best players faced international competition in the MLS All-Star Game.
- For the second consecutive year New England Revolution coach Steve Nicol was the head coach for the MLS side.
- Former CBC affiliate, then E! and now CityTV affiliate CHAT-TV in Medicine Hat, Alberta did not air the game, because of Calgary CBC station CBRT-TV, as well as online through live streaming on the CBC sports website.
