= 2021 MLS All-Star Game =

Soccer game played in Los Angeles, California

Target All-Star Los Angeles '21
- Event: 2021 Major League Soccer season
MLS All-Stars	Liga MX All-Stars
(United States) (Canada)	(Mexico)
1	1
- MLS All-Stars won 3–2 on penalties
- Date: August 25, 2021
- Venue: Banc of California Stadium, Los Angeles, California
- Most Valuable Player: Matt Turner (MLS All-Stars)
- Referee: Armando Villarreal (United States)
- Attendance: 21,000

The 2021 Major League Soccer All-Star Game was the 25th edition of the annual Major League Soccer All-Star Game, an exhibition soccer match in the United States. The game, featuring the MLS All-Stars taking on the Liga MX All-Stars, was played at Banc of California Stadium in Los Angeles, California.

The game was originally scheduled to take place on July 29, 2020, during the 2020 season, but was postponed on May 19, 2021, due to the COVID-19 pandemic. The game was televised domestically on Fox Sports 1 and Univision in the United States, and on TSN and TVA Sports in Canada.

The MLS All-Stars won the match 3–2 on penalties after the 90 minute-match ended in a 1–1 tie.

== Match planning ==
The Major League Soccer All-Star Game originally fielded two all-star teams from the Western and Eastern conferences. Other competition formats pitted an all-star team against various opponents, including the United States men's national soccer team and clubs from Mexico and Europe. An exhibition between the MLS All-Stars and an all-star team from Liga MX, the top flight of Mexican soccer, was proposed in the mid-2010s as part of a closer relationship between the leagues. Officials from MLS and Liga MX announced a new partnership in March 2018, including new club competitions like the Campeones Cup and Leagues Cup, and a commitment for a shared all-star game. Liga MX president Enrique Bonilla attended the 2018 MLS All-Star Game in Atlanta with MLS commissioner Don Garber, where they continued discussions for the match, including a potential venue in the Los Angeles area.

On November 20, 2019, MLS officially announced that the 2020 All-Star Game would be played against the Liga MX All-Stars at Banc of California Stadium, the home of Los Angeles FC. It is the first to be played against an all-star team from another league. LAFC head coach Bob Bradley was selected as the manager of the MLS All-Star team. It is the first MLS All-Star Game to be played in the Los Angeles area since 2003, which was hosted by the LA Galaxy at the Home Depot Center, now known as Dignity Health Sports Park.

On May 19, 2020, MLS announced that the All-Star Game would be canceled alongside the 2020 Leagues Cup and 2020 Campeones Cup due to the COVID-19 pandemic. The league later announced that the All-Star Game would be rescheduled for the 2021 season in Los Angeles, with the MLS All-Stars against the Liga MX All-Stars. The league announced on June 9, 2021, that the All-Star Game against Liga MX would be played on August 25 at Banc of California Stadium.

== Squads ==
=== MLS All-Stars ===
The MLS All-Star squad was announced on August 4, 2021. Carlos Vela and Javier Hernández withdrew due to injury. New England players Carles Gil and Tajon Buchanan withdrew as well as Minnesota United midfielder Emanuel Reynoso. Rodolfo Pizarro, George Bello, and Sebastian Lletget were added as replacements.

Six members of the starting XI were selected from Seattle Sounders FC, tying the record set by D.C. United in 2006. Brothers Cristian Roldan and Alex Roldán also became the first brothers to play for the All-Star team.

Note: Flags indicate national team as defined under FIFA eligibility rules; some limited exceptions apply. Players may hold more than one non-FIFA nationality.

No.	Pos.	Nation	Player
1	GK	PER	Pedro Gallese (Orlando City SC)
2	DF	USA	Julián Araujo (LA Galaxy)
3	DF	USA	George Bello (Atlanta United FC)
5	DF	CMR	Nouhou (Seattle Sounders FC)
6	MF	BRA	João Paulo (Seattle Sounders FC)
7	FW	ARG	Gustavo Bou (New England Revolution)
8	MF	CRO	Damir Kreilach (Real Salt Lake)
9	FW	PER	Raúl Ruidíaz (Seattle Sounders FC)
11	MF	ARG	Lucas Zelarayán (Columbus Crew)
12	DF	USA	Miles Robinson (Atlanta United FC)
13	DF	ESA	Alex Roldán (Seattle Sounders FC)
15	MF	MEX	Rodolfo Pizarro (Inter Miami CF)
16	DF	USA	James Sands (New York City FC)
17	FW	POR	Nani (Orlando City SC)

No.	Pos.	Nation	Player
18	MF	USA	Sebastian Lletget (LA Galaxy)
19	FW	HUN	Dániel Sallói (Sporting Kansas City)
20	MF	COL	Eduard Atuesta (Los Angeles FC)
21	FW	URU	Diego Rossi (Los Angeles FC)
23	MF	USA	Cristian Roldan (Seattle Sounders FC)
24	FW	USA	Ricardo Pepi (FC Dallas)
25	DF	USA	Walker Zimmerman (Nashville SC)
26	GK	JAM	Andre Blake (Philadelphia Union)
27	DF	GER	Kai Wagner (Philadelphia Union)
28	DF	COL	Yeimar Gómez Andrade (Seattle Sounders FC)
30	GK	USA	Matt Turner (New England Revolution)
44	FW	USA	Cade Cowell (San Jose Earthquakes)
94	DF	COL	Jesús David Murillo (Los Angeles FC)

- Manager: (United States) Bob Bradley (Los Angeles FC)

=== Liga MX All-Stars ===
The Liga MX All-Star squad was announced on July 19, 2021. Nahuel Guzmán and Jorge Sánchez were called up as replacements for José de Jesús Corona and Fernando Navarro who withdrew due to injury. On August 23, the final squad was announced with 10 new players added.

Note: Flags indicate national team as defined under FIFA eligibility rules; some limited exceptions apply. Players may hold more than one non-FIFA nationality.

No.	Pos.	Nation	Player
1	GK	ARG	Nahuel Guzmán (UANL)
2	DF	BRA	Dória (Santos Laguna)
3	DF	MEX	Jorge Sánchez (América)
4	DF	MEX	César Montes (Monterrey)
5	MF	PER	Pedro Aquino (América)
6	DF	COL	William Tesillo (León)
7	FW	MEX	Rogelio Funes Mori (Monterrey)
8	MF	MEX	Orbelín Pineda (Cruz Azul)
9	FW	ARG	Nicolás Ibáñez (Pachuca)
10	MF	MEX	Alexis Vega (Guadalajara)
11	MF	URU	Fernando Gorriarán (Santos Laguna)
12	GK	MEX	Alfredo Talavera (UNAM)
13	GK	MEX	Guillermo Ochoa (América)
14	MF	ARG	Rubens Sambueza (Toluca)

No.	Pos.	Nation	Player
15	MF	ECU	Ángel Mena (León)
16	MF	MEX	Javier Salas (Puebla)
17	DF	MEX	Kevin Álvarez (Pachuca)
18	MF	MEX	Érik Lira (UNAM)
19	MF	CHI	Diego Valdés (Santos Laguna)
21	FW	URU	Jonathan Rodríguez (Cruz Azul)
23	DF	PAR	Pablo Aguilar (Cruz Azul)
24	DF	PAR	Juan Escobar (Cruz Azul)
25	FW	ARG	Alexis Canelo (Toluca)
26	DF	MEX	Salvador Reyes (América)
27	MF	MEX	Luis Romo (Cruz Azul)
29	FW	MEX	Santiago Giménez (Cruz Azul)
34	DF	MEX	Víctor Guzmán (Tijuana)

- Manager: (Peru) Juan Reynoso (Cruz Azul)

== Skills Challenge ==
The MLS All-Star Skills Challenge was played on August 24 at Banc of California Park between eight players from each team in five events. The Liga MX All-Stars defeated the MLS All-Stars in the competition by a score of 26–25, with the tiebreaker scored by Cruz Azul forward Jonathan Rodríguez in the Crossbar Challenge.

== Broadcasting ==
The All-Star Game and Skills Challenge were both broadcast in the United States on Fox Sports 1 in English and TUDN in Spanish, as well as TSN and TVA Sports in Canada. Fox Sports broadcast the match in 4K HDR and also deployed several special slow-motion cameras for the match, as well as a skycam. The Fox Sports broadcast averaged 175,000 viewers, setting a record low for the event's English broadcasts, while the TUDN broadcast averaged 1.4 million and peaked at 1.6 million—the second-most for a Spanish broadcast of the match.

== Match ==
2021 MLS All-Star Game
August 25, 2021
6:30 p.m. PDT

MLS All-Stars (United States) (Canada)	1–1	(Mexico) Liga MX All-Stars
Murillo 53'	Report	Rodríguez 20'
Penalties
Kreilach (penalty scored); Sallói (penalty scored); Atuesta (penalty missed); Nani (penalty missed); Pepi (penalty scored)	3–2	(penalty scored) Sambueza; (penalty missed) Funes Mori; (penalty missed) Lira; (penalty missed) Reyes; (penalty scored) Romo

Banc of California Stadium, Los Angeles, California
Attendance: 21,000
Referee: Armando Villarreal (United States)

MLS All-Stars	Liga MX All-Stars

=== Match rules ===
- Unlimited substitutions
- Penalty shootout if tied at full time; no extra time
