= Matt Reis =

American former soccer player and coach (born 1975)

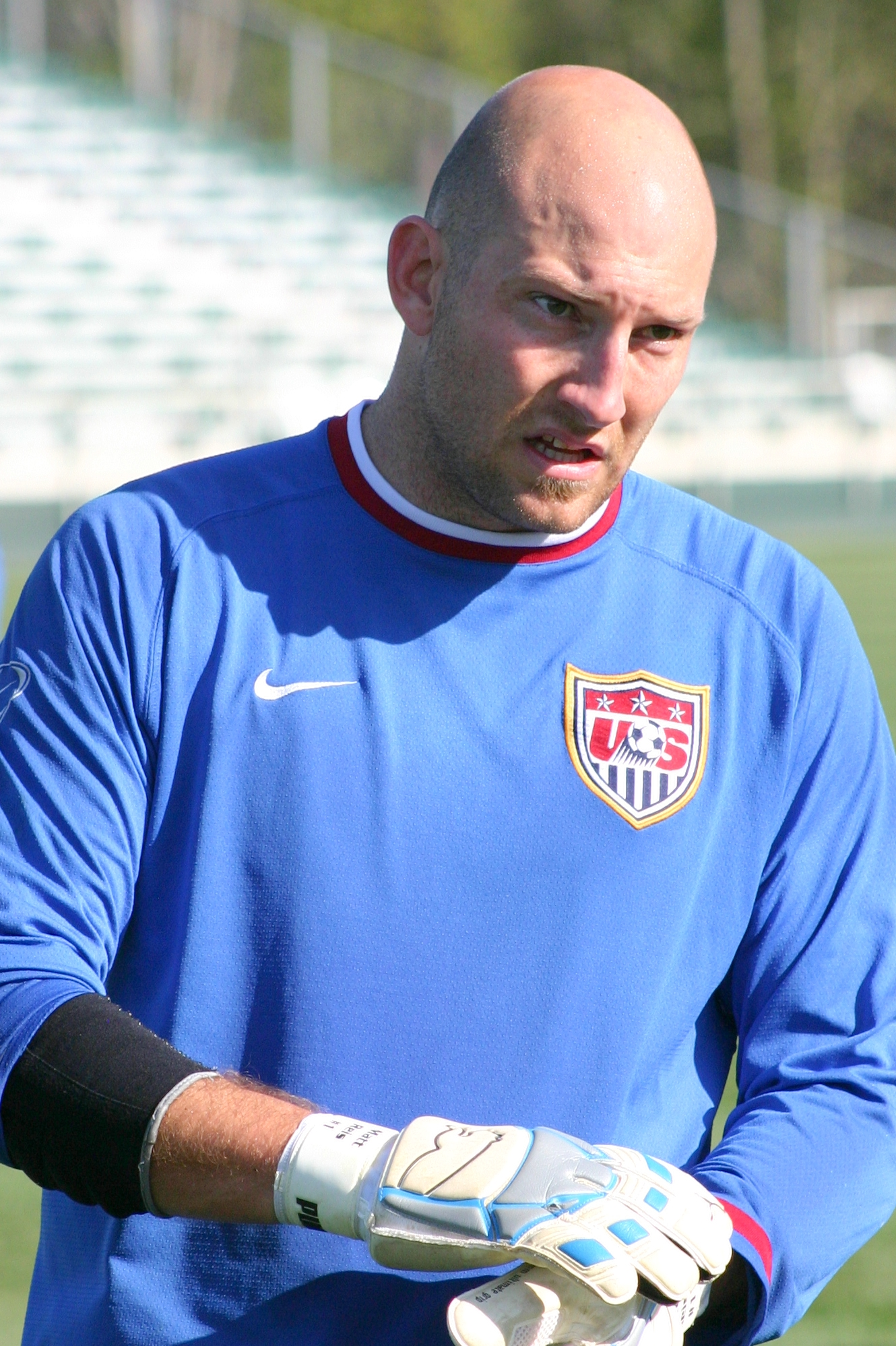

Personal information
- Date of birth: March 28, 1975 (age 51)
- Place of birth: Atlanta, Georgia, United States
- Height: 6 ft 1 in (1.85 m)
- Position: Goalkeeper

College career
Years	Team	Apps	(Gls)
1994–1997	UCLA Bruins		

Senior career*
Years	Team	Apps	(Gls)
1998–2002	Los Angeles Galaxy	39	(0)
2000	→ Orange County (loan)	7	(0)
2003–2013	New England Revolution	254	(0)
Total		300	(0)

International career
2006–2007	United States	2	(0)

Managerial career
- 2014–2016: LA Galaxy (assistant)
- 2017–2018: United States (assistant)
- 2019: Columbus Crew (assistant)
Medal record
Representing United States
Winner	CONCACAF Gold Cup	2005
Men's Soccer
- * Club domestic league appearances and goals

Matt Reis (/riːs/ REESS; born March 28, 1975) is an American former soccer player and coach who played as a goalkeeper. A long-time Major League Soccer mainstay, he has served as goalkeeper coach for LA Galaxy and the United States.

== Youth and college ==
Reid was born in Atlanta and raised in Southern California. He played college soccer at UCLA. He finished his college career with an NCAA Championship in 1997, and was named 1997 NCAA College Cup Defensive MVP after recording 20 saves - including a school-record 11 in the semifinals - and posting 221 shutout minutes on the way to the title.

== Career ==
=== Professional ===
==== LA Galaxy ====
Reis was selected by the Los Angeles Galaxy in the third round (26th overall) in the 1998 MLS College Draft on January 31, 1998. However, with Kevin Hartman firmly entrenched as the club's starter, Reis did not see much playing time during his five seasons in LA. Reis' largest contribution to the club came in 2001, when he made 16 appearances (15 starts), recording a 1.41 GAA with six shutouts.

In 2000, the Galaxy sent him on loan to the Orange County Waves for seven games.

==== New England Revolution ====
On January 17, 2003, Reis was traded to the New England Revolution in exchange for Alex Pineda Chacón and a second-round pick in the 2003 MLS SuperDraft.

Reis made his Revolution debut on July 19, 2003, starting in a 3-1 loss to the Chicago Fire.

Although signed by the Revolution as backup to Adin Brown, Reis became the club's starer in 2004 after Brown was sidelined with injuries. Reis is widely considered one of the best goalkeepers in MLS during the 2000s. He was a finalist for the MLS Goalkeeper of the Year Award in 2005, 2006, 2007, and 2008. In 2005, Reis received MLS All-Star honors. He was also named Revolution Humanitarian of the Year. He again received MLS All-Star honors in 2006, 2007, and 2008.

In 2004, Reis was named Revolution Defender of the Year. On October 31, he became the first goalie in MLS history to stop two penalty kicks in one playoff game, doing as the Revs upset the much-favored Columbus Crew.

Reis set the Revolution club-record for shutouts in 2005, recording ten; a tally he would match again in 2006 and then again in 2007.

On October 28, 2006, Reis saved two of four penalties, and converted a shot of his own, in the penalty shootout against the Chicago Fire in the Eastern Conference Semifinals of the 2006 MLS Cup Playoffs.

Reis helped the Revolution to their first two pieces of silverware in club history; winning the Lamar Hunt US Open Cup in 2007, and the SuperLiga in 2008. He was also named the 2008 Midnight Riders Man of the Year.

Reis was again named Revolution Most Valuable Player in 2011, recording 111 saves and five shut-outs. in In 2012, Reis became the first player in Revolution history to win MLS Save of the Week honors, earning the award in week 20 in a 0-0 draw with Sporting Kansas City, a match in which he made six saves and recorded his fourth clean sheet of the season. He was additionally named Revolution Humanitarian of the Year in 2012 and 2013.

Reis announced his retirement on December 11, 2013, joining the Los Angeles Galaxy as goalkeeper coach. He concluded his career as the Revolution's all-time statistical leader several categories, including: appearances by a goalkeeper (254), starts (253), minutes played (22,697), goals against average (1.31), wins (93), saves (989), shutouts (66) and save percentage (72.3).

=== International ===
Reis earned his first cap for the United States on January 22, 2006, a 0–0 shutout against Canada. He was an alternate for the 2006 U.S. World Cup squad. Reis' second cap came on January 20, 2007, in which he started and earned a 3-1 victory over Denmark. In the match, Reis wore a headband honoring David Vanole, who had died earlier in the month. Vanole had coached Reis both in college and with the Revolution.

== Personal ==
Reis was considered to be a bit of a jokester among his teammates and in the soccer community. As an April Fools' Day prank in 2004, the Revs' front office announced their newest foreign acquisition, Luis "El Lobo" Fangoso, who eventually turned out to be Matt Reis wearing a shaggy wig and headband. Although the initial joke died down fairly quickly, Reis' antics helped him win over many Revolution fans (to this day, Revs fans occasionally make joking references to Fangoso when discussing possible player transactions). On April 1, 2007, the Revolution announced that they had resigned Fangoso to a 2-year deal.

On April Fool's Day in 2005, the team announced that Reis was retiring to pursue a career in musical theater. The team distributed a press release complete with an image of Reis painted blue.

Reis, who is bald, also convinced Mexican international José Manuel Abundis, who had just signed with the team, to shave his head for the 2006 MLS Playoffs. This has enabled Reis to achieve cult status among Revs fans who know him as the "Skin headed, short sleeved shot stopper."

Reis is married to Nicole Reis (née Odom), who was an All American Softball player at UCLA. They have three boys. He is the son of J.T. and Kathy Reis of Mission Viejo, California, and he has one older brother, Mike.

On 15 April 2013, Reis was present at the Boston Marathon bombing where he saved the life of his father-in-law (John Odom), whose legs had been pierced by shrapnel, causing two severed arteries.

== Honors ==
=== Individual ===
- MLS Humanitarian of the Year: 2013
- New England Revolution All-Time Team: 2020
- UCLA Athletics Hall of Fame: class of 2026

=== Team ===
United States

- CONCACAF Gold Cup Champions (1): 2005

Los Angeles Galaxy

- CONCACAF Champions Cup (1): 2000
- MLS Cup (1): 2002
- Supporters' Shield (2): 1998, 2002
- U.S. Open Cup (1): 2001

New England Revolution

- U.S. Open Cup (1): 2007
- North American SuperLiga (1): 2008
