= Adidas Prime =

Family and brand of association footballs

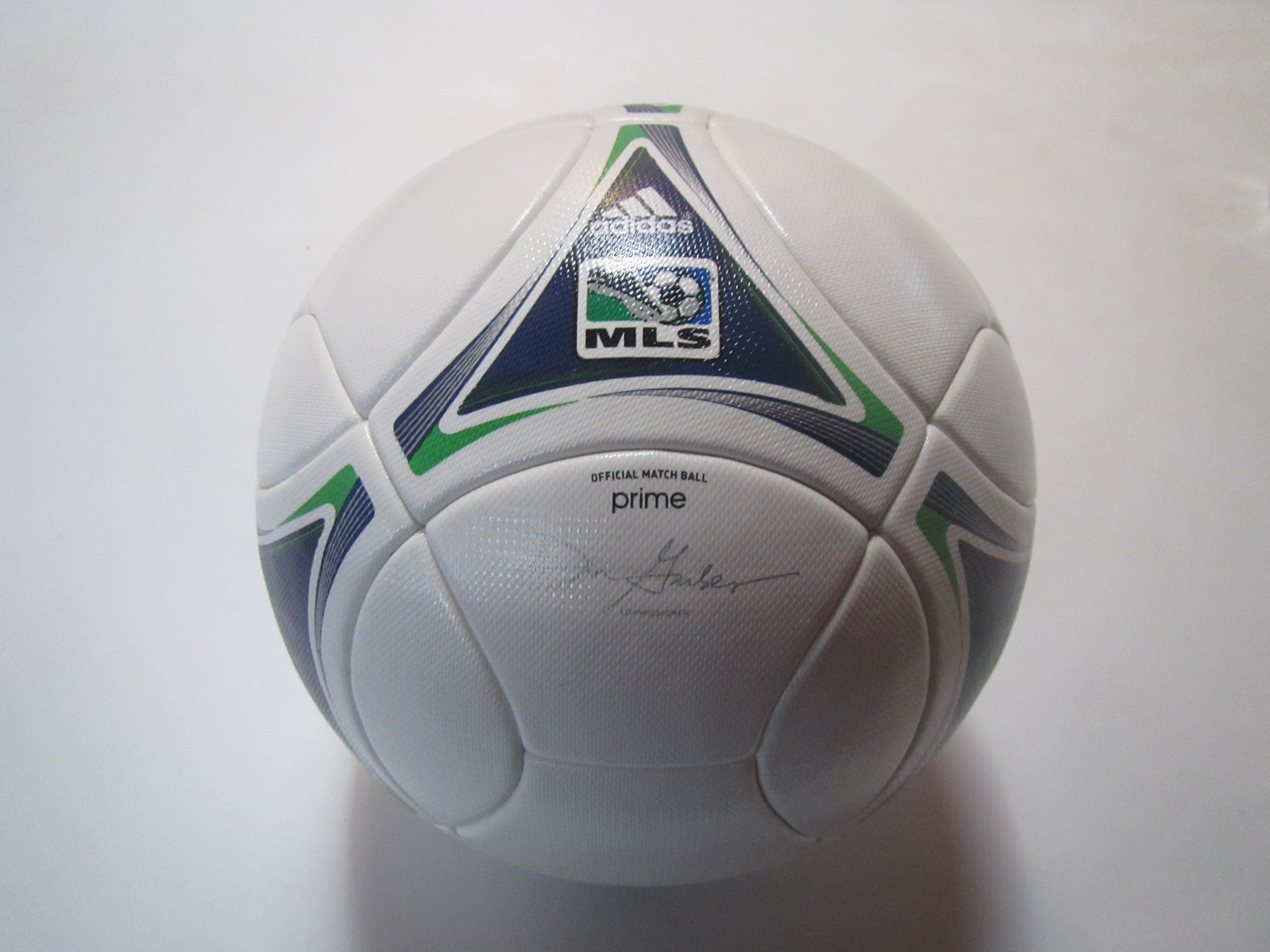
Adidas Prime

The Adidas Prime is a family and brand of association football balls by German multinational athletic apparel and footwear corporation Adidas. The Prime balls have had different numbers in their names applied to them to distinguish them in their construction.

== Adidas Prime ==
The Adidas Prime was based on the same technology introduced with Adidas Tango 12, its main color was white and showed the same type of decoration of the latter colored of green, blue and white. It was used as the official match ball of 2012 MLS season. For the international day for the fight against breast cancer the MLS used a variant with a pink decoration, while a silver version with a golden decoration was used for 2012 MLS play-offs. Other two variants of Tango 12 were respectively used as official match balls of 2011 FIFA Club World Cup and of 2011–12 Argentine Primera División. As official match ball of 2012–13 Ligue 1 was used a variant of Adidas Prime called Le 80, that had a red decoration with white and blue details. Its name was a reference to the 80th anniversary of Ligue 1. Of this ball was realized a winter high-visibility version.

== Adidas Prime 2 ==
The Adidas Prime 2 used the same decoration pattern and colors of the first version, but the drawing showed three green ribbons forming the triangles. It was used as the official match ball of 2013 MLS season. A version with a gold and silver decoration was used for 2013 MLS play-offs. However, this type of triadic pattern was later replaced with the circular pattern used for Adidas Cafusa, showed for the first time by the official match ball of 2012–13 UEFA Europa League. As official match ball of 2013 J.League Cup was used a variant of Adidas Cafusa called Kotohogi, this was mainly colored red, a white pattern with multicolor details. Its name was a reference to the 20th anniversary of J.League. Another variant of Cafusa called Tafugo was used for 2013–14 Argentine Primera División season. The name "Tafugo" is a syllabic abbreviation of the words "tango", "futbol" (football) and "goles" (goals). A silver variant, Tafugo Derby, was used in the Superclásicos of the same season. Other versions of Cafusa were used an official match balls of 2013–14 UEFA Europa League and 2013–14 Ligue 1.

== Adidas Prime 3 ==
The Adidas Prime 3 was based on the same technology introduced with Adidas Brazuca, its main color was white and showed the same type of decoration of the latter colored of red and black. It was used as the official match ball of 2014 MLS season. Other versions were used as official match balls of 2013 FIFA Club World Cup, 2014 UEFA Super Cup, 2014–15 UEFA Europa League and 2014–15 Ligue 1. However, the Brazuca's pattern was later replaced with the pattern used for Adidas Beau Jeu, that appeared on the official match balls of 2015 FIFA Club World Cup, 2016 UEFA Super Cup, 2016 J1 League and 2016–17 Ligue 1. Of the latters were realized winter high-visibility versions.
