= 2007 MLS All-Star Game =

Soccer game played in Commerce City, Colorado

Sierra Mist 2007 MLS All-Star Game
- Event: MLS All-Stars
| MLS All-Stars | Celtic |
| (United States) (Canada) | (Scotland) |
| 2 | 0 |
- Date: July 19, 2007
- Venue: Dick's Sporting Goods Park, Commerce City, Colorado
- Man of the Match: Juan Pablo Ángel (MLS All-Stars)
- Referee: Baldomero Toledo; David Bragg; Jose Corro; Michael Kennedy
- Attendance: 18,661
- Weather: Cloudy, 85 °F

The 2007 Major League Soccer All-Star Game was the 12th annual Major League Soccer All-Star Game. The 2007 MLS All-Star Game took place on July 19, 2007 between the 2007 MLS All-Stars and Celtic.

Dick's Sporting Goods Park, the new home stadium of the Colorado Rapids in Commerce City, CO, hosted the 2007 Sierra Mist All-Star Game. This was the first time that Dick's Sporting Goods Park hosted the MLS All-Star game.

David Beckham made an appearance and participated in a special introduction to the fans on hand as well as in a halftime ESPN interview, and watched the game from the Commissioner's Box.

The MLS All-Stars defeated Celtic 2–0, giving them a perfect 4–0 record against international competition.

== Background ==
Major League Soccer announced on Thursday, January 25, 2007 that Dick's Sporting Goods Park, the new home of the Colorado Rapids located just outside downtown Denver, will host the 2007 Sierra Mist MLS All-Star Game on July 19, pitting Scottish club Celtic FC against the best from MLS. MLS announced the news during a press conference at The Pinnacle Club in the Grand Hyatt featuring MLS Deputy Commissioner Ivan Gazidis and Colorado Rapids Managing Director Jeff Plush. "We are thrilled to welcome Celtic, one of the world's most popular teams, for a quality match against the best of MLS at our newest soccer cathedral, Dick's Sporting Goods Park," said MLS Commissioner Don Garber. "We look forward to an exciting evening in this tremendous new soccer-specific venue."

=== Celtic ===
Glasgow-based club Celtic won their 41st Scottish championship in April (2007), featuring high-level players such as Polish goalkeeper Artur Boruc, Scottish defenders Steven Pressley and Stephen McManus, Japanese midfielder Shunsuke Nakamura, Danish midfielder Thomas Gravesen and Dutch striker Jan Vennegoor of Hesselink. Celtic’s history, being the first British club to win the European Cup in 1967, has resulted in a large audience of the club. Celtic have a long and historic rivalry with fellow Glasgow club Rangers with the two being known as the Old Firm.

== 2007 All-Star Game Rosters ==
=== Major League Soccer ===
Players in bold denotes First XI status.

| Pos. | Player | Team | MLS Exp. |
MLS All-Star Starters
| F | (Colombia) **Juan Pablo Ángel** | New York Red Bulls | 0 |
| F | (United States) **Eddie Johnson** | Kansas City Wizards | 6 |
| M | (Canada) **Dwayne DeRosario** | Houston Dynamo | 6 |
| M | (Grenada) **Shalrie Joseph** | New England Revolution | 4 |
| M | (Colombia) **Juan Toja** | FC Dallas | 0 |
| M | (United States) **Ricardo Clark** | Houston Dynamo | 4 |
| M | (Republic of Ireland) Ronnie O'Brien ~ | Toronto FC | 5 |
| D | (United States) **Jimmy Conrad** | Kansas City Wizards | 8 |
| D | (United States) **Jonathan Bornstein** | Chivas USA | 1 |
| D | (United States) **Michael Parkhurst** | New England Revolution | 2 |
| GK | (United States) **Matt Reis** | New England Revolution | 9 |
All-Star Subs
| F | (United States) Brian Ching ~ | Houston Dynamo | 5 |
| F | (United States) Landon Donovan ~ | Los Angeles Galaxy | 6 |
| M | (United States) Cobi Jones † | Los Angeles Galaxy | 11 |
| M | (United States) Pablo Mastroeni ~ | Colorado Rapids | 9 |
| M | (Argentina) **Christian Gomez** | D.C. United | 3 |
| D | (United States) Eddie Pope † | Real Salt Lake | 11 |
| GK | (United States) Kevin Hartman ~ | Kansas City Wizards | 10 |
All-Star Reserves
| F | (United States) Jeff Cunningham | Toronto FC | 9 |
| F | (England) Danny Dichio | Toronto FC | 0 |
| F | (United States) Taylor Twellman | New England Revolution | 5 |
| M | (United States) Kyle Beckerman | Real Salt Lake | 7 |
| M | (United States) Justin Mapp | Chicago Fire | 5 |
| M | (United States) Ben Olsen | D.C. United | 8 |
| M | (Argentina) Guillermo Barros Schelotto | Columbus Crew | 0 |
| M | (United States) Steve Ralston | New England Revolution | 11 |
| M | (United States) Claudio Reyna | New York Red Bulls | 0 |
| D | (Canada) Jim Brennan | Toronto FC | 0 |
| D | (United States) Kevin Goldthwaite | [Toronto FC] | 3 |
| D | (United States) Eddie Robinson | Houston Dynamo | 6 |
| GK | (United States) Pat Onstad | [Houston Dynamo] | 5 |
| GK | (Canada) Greg Sutton | Toronto FC | 3 |

- Head coach: Steve Nicol (New England Revolution)

~ – Players selected by coach

† – "Commissioner's Picks"

=== Celtic ===
| Pos. | Player |
|---|---|
| GK | (Poland) Artur Boruc |
| D | (England) Lee Naylor |
| D | (Scotland) Mark Wilson |
| D | (Scotland) Stephen McManus |
| D | (Scotland) John Kennedy |
| M | (Scotland) Scott Brown |
| M | (Italy) Massimo Donati |
| M | (Republic of Ireland) Aiden McGeady |
| M | (Iceland) Theódór Elmar Bjarnason |
| F | (Netherlands) Jan Vennegoor of Hesselink |
| F | (Australia) Scott McDonald |

== All-Star Selections By Club ==
| Club | # Selections |
|---|---|
| New England Revolution | 5 |
| Houston Dynamo | 4 |
| Toronto FC | 4 |
| New York Red Bulls | 3 |
| Kansas City Wizards | 3 |
| Chivas USA | 2 |
| D.C. United | 2 |
| Real Salt Lake | 2 |
| Columbus Crew | 1 |
| Los Angeles Galaxy | 2 |
| FC Dallas | 1 |
| Colorado Rapids | 1 |
| Chicago Fire | 1 |

== Match details ==
2007 MLS All-Star Game
July 19, 2007

| MLS All-Stars (United States) (Canada) | 2–0 | (Scotland) Celtic |
|---|---|---|
| Ángel 36'; Toja 44' | Report |

Dick's Sporting Goods Park, Commerce City, Colorado
Attendance: 18,661
Referee: Baldomero Toledo

| MLS All-Stars | Celtic |

| GK | 1 | (United States) Matt Reis | (substituted off) 47+' |
| CB | 15 | (United States) Michael Parkhurst | (substituted off) 83' |
| CB | 12 | (United States) Jimmy Conrad |
| CB | 3 | (United States) Jonathan Bornstein |
| LM | 5 | (Republic of Ireland) Ronnie O'Brien | (substituted off) 80' |
| CM | 21 | (Grenada) Shalrie Joseph |
| CM | 26 | (United States) Ricardo Clark | (substituted off) 60' |
| RM | 8 | (Colombia) Juan Toja |
| AM | 14 | (Canada) Dwayne De Rosario | (substituted off) 65' |
| FW | 7 | (United States) Eddie Johnson | (substituted off) 65' |
| FW | 9 | (Colombia) Juan Pablo Ángel | (substituted off) 65' |
Substitutions:
| GK | | (United States) Kevin Hartman | (substituted on) 47+' |
| DF | | (United States) Eddie Pope | (substituted on) 83' |
| MF | | (United States) Pablo Mastroeni | (substituted on) 60' |
| MF | | (Argentina) Christian Gomez | (substituted on) 65' |
| MF | | (United States) Cobi Jones | (substituted on) 80' |
| FW | | (United States) Brian Ching | (substituted on) 65' |
| FW | | (United States) Landon Donovan | (substituted on) 65' |
Coach:
(Scotland) Steve Nicol

| GK | 1 | (Poland) Artur Boruc |
| LB | 3 | (England) Lee Naylor |
| CB | 44 | (Scotland) Stephen McManus |
| CB | 17 | (Scotland) Steven Pressley | (substituted off) 73' |
| RB | 12 | (Scotland) Mark Wilson |
| LM | 20 | (Czech Republic) Jiří Jarošík | (substituted off) 53' |
| CM | 18 | (Italy) Massimo Donati | (substituted off) 68' |
| CM | 8 | (Scotland) Scott Brown |
| LM | 11 | (Scotland) Paul Hartley |
| FW | 27 | (Australia) Scott McDonald | (substituted off) 66' |
| FW | 10 | (Netherlands) Jan Vennegoor of Hesselink | (substituted off) 53' |
Substitutions:
| CB | 6 | (Guinea) Bobo Baldé | (substituted on) 73' |
| CM | 16 | (Denmark) Thomas Gravesen | (substituted on) 68' |
| FW | 46 | (Republic of Ireland) Aiden McGeady | (substituted on) 53' |
| FW | 7 | (Poland) Maciej Żurawski | (substituted on) 66' |
| FW | 9 | (Scotland) Kenny Miller | (substituted on) 53' |
Coach:
(Scotland) Gordon Strachan

MLS All-Star MVP:
Juan Pablo Ángel (MLS)
Assistant referees:
David Bragg
Jose Corro
Fourth official:
Michael Kennedy

Match rules

- 90 minutes.
- Unlimited substitutions.
- No extra time.
- Penalty shoot-out if scores still level.
