= MLS All-Star Game =

Soccer competition in the United States and Canada

- Founded: 1996
- Region: Major League Soccer (CONCACAF)
- Teams: 2
- Current champions: (United States) (Canada) MLS All-Stars (2026, 13th title)
- Most championships: (United States) (Canada) MLS All-Stars (13 titles)
- Broadcaster: MLS Season Pass
- 2026 MLS All-Star Game

The Major League Soccer All-Star Game is an annual soccer game held by Major League Soccer featuring selected players from the league against an international club or selected players from another league. MLS initially adopted a traditional all-star game format used by other North American sports leagues where the Eastern Conference squared off against the Western Conference. This eventually evolved into the current system where the league annually invites a club from abroad to play against a league all-star team in a friendly match. The MLS All-Stars hold a 13–10 record in the competition, which generally marks the season's midpoint. Players are awarded roster spots through a combination of fan voting and selections by the appointed manager and league commissioner.

In case of a tie after full-time, the game does not use a 30-minute extra time period; instead it goes straight to a penalty shoot-out. The match is preceded by a skills challenge tournament, which was introduced in 2018 and features three-player teams competing in various events. The All-Star Game also runs parallel to the MLS Next All-Star Game, which debuted in 2014 as the Homegrown Game.

== History ==
Major League Soccer's first all-star game was played at Giants Stadium in the summer of 1996. The game, using an East–West format with players handpicked by the coaching staffs to emulate other American leagues, was the first game of a doubleheader with the Brazil national team defeating a team of FIFA World All-Stars. The matchup between divisions would only be used for six seasons as MLS tried experimenting with different formats. The 1998 All-Star Game placed a team of American MLS players against MLS players from abroad. The 2002 game, the first to use a league-wide all-star team, was the only game to feature a national team opponent (that opponent being the United States).

From 2002-19 (except in 2004) and again in 2023, every opponent was a foreign club invited by the league. The MLS All-Stars won their first six games before falling to Everton in penalties in 2009. All games from 2005 to 2019 have been against teams from Europe, the majority of which have been from England's Premier League. The European league schedule runs from fall to spring, allowing for a fixture against the MLS All-Stars during the preseasons of teams. The 2020 All-Star Game was to be the first to feature the all-star team from another league, Liga MX; however, that game was cancelled.

In August 2005, an 18-player all-star team squad named the "MLS Select Team" competed in the Trofeo Santiago Bernabéu, a friendly hosted by Real Madrid at the Santiago Bernabéu Stadium in Madrid. The All-Star team, coached by Steve Nicol, lost 5–0 after being given only two days to prepare between normal league matches.

The roster is chosen using a mix of fan votes, nominations from the coach, and commissioner's pick. Some players, including English midfielders Steven Gerrard and Frank Lampard in 2015, have been picked to participate in the All-Star Game despite not playing in club matches. Players who are picked to play in the All-Star Game but refuse to join the team are suspended from one league match.

== Roster ==
For 2014, ten players were chosen by All-Star Game coach Caleb Porter, eleven players were chosen by fan voting (subject to Porter's approval), and two were selected by MLS commissioner Don Garber.

== Skills Challenge ==
The modern incarnation of the MLS All-Star Skills Challenge, introduced in 2018, is a freestyle soccer event that features three-player teams competing against each other in minigames, including a touch-and-volley goal showcase, a shooting accuracy competition, and a passing-and-shooting challenge. The older version of the skills challenge was retired in 2001 and featured other events, including "goalie wars" and soccer tennis.

== Results by team ==
=== Internal All-Star matchups ===
Team	Won	Lost	Total	Appearances
MLS East	5 (Note: One tie that is counted as a shared win.)	1	6	1996; 1997; 1999; 2000; 2001; 2004
MLS West	2	4	6	1996; 1997; 1999; 2000; 2001; 2004
MLS USA	1	—	1	1998
MLS World	—	1	1	1998

=== MLS All-Stars vs invited opponents ===
Team	Won	Lost	Total	Appearances
(United States) (Canada) MLS All-Stars	13	10	23	2002; 2003; 2005; 2006; 2007; 2008; 2009; 2010; 2011; 2012; 2013; 2014; 2015; 2016; 2017; 2018; 2019; 2021; 2022; 2023; 2024; 2025; 2026
(England) Arsenal	2	—	2	2016; 2023
(England) Manchester United	2	—	2	2010; 2011
(Mexico) Liga MX All-Stars	1	4	5	2021; 2022; 2024; 2025; 2026
(England) Everton	1	—	1	2009
(Italy) Juventus	1	—	1	2018
(Italy) Roma	1	—	1	2013
(Spain) Atlético Madrid	1	—	1	2019
(Spain) Real Madrid	1	—	1	2017
(England) Chelsea	—	2	2	2006; 2012
(England) Fulham	—	1	1	2005
(England) Tottenham Hotspur	—	1	1	2015
(England) West Ham United	—	1	1	2008
(Germany) Bayern Munich	—	1	1	2014
(Mexico) Guadalajara	—	1	1	2003
(Scotland) Celtic	—	1	1	2007
United States	—	1	1	2002

== Results by nation ==
Nation	Winners	Runners-up	Total
United States	18	16	34
Canada	12	9	21
England	5	5	10
Italy	2	—	2
Spain	2	—	2
Germany	—	1	1
Mexico	1	3	4
Scotland	—	1	1
(United Nations) World	—	1	1

== Results by year ==
=== "East vs. West" (1996–1997) ===
July 14, 1996 1996 MLS All-Star Game	MLS East (United States)	3–2	(United States) MLS West	Giants Stadium, East Rutherford, New Jersey
	Ramos 14'; Savarese 69'; Pittman 88'	Report	Preki 33'; Kreis 37'	Attendance: 78,416; Referee: Kevin Stott; MVP: Carlos Valderrama

July 9, 1997 1997 MLS All-Star Game	MLS East (United States)	5–4	(United States) MLS West	Giants Stadium, East Rutherford, New Jersey
	Valderrama 50'; Galderisi 63'; Warzycha 66'; Williams 70'; McBride 88'	Report	Washington 11'; Campos 44'; Takawira 80'; Jones 86'	Attendance: 24,816; Referee: Arturo Angeles; MVP: Carlos Valderrama

=== "MLS USA vs. MLS World" (1998) ===
August 2, 1998 1998 MLS All-Star Game	MLS USA (United States)	6–1	(United Nations) MLS World	Citrus Bowl, Orlando, Florida
	T. Ramos 5'; Lalas 15'; McBride 16'; Preki 40'; Lassiter 78'; Jones 83'	Report	M. Ramos 89'	Attendance: 34,416; Referee: Esse Baharmast; MVP: Brian McBride

=== "East vs. West" (1999–2001) ===
July 17, 1999 1999 MLS All-Star Game	MLS East (United States)	4–6	(United States) MLS West	Qualcomm Stadium, San Diego, California
	Lassiter 1'; Moore 62' (pen.); Valderrama 73'; John 83'	Report	Preki 13', 38'; Kosecki 32'; Jones 36'; Wright 84'; Cerritos 89'	Attendance: 23,227; Referee: Sandra Hunt; MVP: Preki

July 29, 2000 2000 MLS All-Star Game	MLS West (United States)	4–9	(United States) MLS East	Columbus Crew Stadium, Columbus, Ohio
	Razov 17', 22'; Cienfuegos 19'; Nowak 44'	Report	Mathis 2'; Moreno 36'; Valencia 39'; Chung 51'; Diallo 59', 61'; Heaps 65'; Washington 67'; McBride 76'	Attendance: 23,495; Referee: Paul Tamberino; MVP: Mamadou Diallo

July 28, 2001 2001 MLS All-Star Game	MLS West (United States)	6–6	(United States) MLS East	Spartan Stadium, San Jose, California
	Donovan 3', 7', 19', 90+2'; Graziani 26'; Kovalenko 69'	Report	Chacón 28'; McBride 34', 39'; Diallo 53'; Rooney 84'; Catê 87'	Attendance: 23,512; Referee: Noel Kenney; MVP: Landon Donovan

=== "All-Stars vs. Guest" (2002–2003) ===
August 3, 2002 2002 MLS All-Star Game	MLS All-Stars (United States)	3–2	United States	RFK Stadium, Washington, D.C.
	Kreis 59'; Etcheverry 72'; Ralston 81'	Report	Donovan 58'; Jones 76'	Attendance: 31,096; Referee: Brian Hall; MVP: Marco Etcheverry

August 2, 2003 2003 MLS All-Star Game	MLS All-Stars (United States)	3–1	(Mexico) Guadalajara	Home Depot Center, Carson, California
	Razov 57'; Ruiz 68'; Beasley 83'	Report	García 66'	Attendance: 27,000; Referee: Kevin Terry; MVP: Carlos Ruiz

=== "East vs. West" (2004) ===
July 31, 2004 2004 MLS All-Star Game	MLS East (United States)	3–2	(United States) MLS West	RFK Stadium, Washington, D.C.
	Guevara 20', 22' (pen.); Eskandarian 74'	Report	Ching 43'; Kreis 89'	Attendance: 21,378; Referee: Michael Kennedy; MVP: Amado Guevara

=== "All-Stars vs. Europe" (2005–2019) ===
July 30, 2005 2005 MLS All-Star Game	MLS All-Stars (United States)	4–1	(England) Fulham	Columbus Crew Stadium, Columbus, Ohio
	Twellman 23'; O’Brien 56'; Cunningham 85', 89'	Report	Jensen 66' (pen.)	Attendance: 23,309; Referee: Ricardo Valenzuela; MVP: Taylor Twellman

August 5, 2006 2006 MLS All-Star Game	MLS All-Stars (United States)	1–0	(England) Chelsea	Toyota Park, Bridgeview, Illinois
	De Rosario 70'	Report		Attendance: 21,210; Referee: Abbey Okulaja; MVP: Dwayne De Rosario

July 19, 2007 2007 MLS All-Star Game	MLS All-Stars (United States) (Canada)	2–0	(Scotland) Celtic	Dick's Sporting Goods Park, Commerce City, Colorado
	Ángel 36'; Toja 44'	Report		Attendance: 18,661; Referee: Baldomero Toledo; MVP: Juan Pablo Ángel

July 24, 2008 2008 MLS All-Star Game	MLS All-Stars (United States) (Canada)	3–2	(England) West Ham United	BMO Field, Toronto, Ontario
	Gómez 27'; Blanco 45'; De Rosario 70' (pen.)	Report	Ashton 26', 67'	Attendance: 20,844; Referee: Mauricio Navarro; MVP: Cuauhtémoc Blanco

July 29, 2009 2009 MLS All-Star Game	MLS All-Stars (United States) (Canada)	1–1 (3–4 p)	(England) Everton	Rio Tinto Stadium, Sandy, Utah
	Davis 26'	Report	Saha 12'	Attendance: 20,124; Referee: Ricardo Salazar; MVP: Tim Howard
	Penalties
	Donovan (penalty scored); Davis (penalty missed); Arnaud (penalty missed); Johnson (penalty scored); Casey (penalty scored); Ljungberg (penalty missed)		(penalty missed) Vaughan; (penalty missed) Jô; (penalty scored) Baines; ( (penalty scored) Neville: (penalty scored) Lescott; (penalty scored) Rodwell

July 28, 2010 2010 MLS All-Star Game	MLS All-Stars (United States) (Canada)	2–5	(England) Manchester United	Reliant Stadium, Houston, Texas
	Ching 64'; De Rosario 90'	Report	Macheda 1', 13'; Gibson 70'; Cleverley 73'; Hernández 84'	Attendance: 70,728; Referee: Jorge Gonzalez; MVP: Federico Macheda

July 27, 2011 2011 MLS All-Star Game	MLS All-Stars (United States) (Canada)	0–4	(England) Manchester United	Red Bull Arena, Harrison, New Jersey
		Report	Anderson 20'; Park Ji-sung 45'; Berbatov 52'; Welbeck 68'	Attendance: 26,760; Referee: Jair Marrufo; MVP: Park Ji-sung

July 25, 2012 2012 MLS All-Star Game	MLS All-Stars (United States) (Canada)	3–2	(England) Chelsea	PPL Park, Chester, Pennsylvania
	Wondolowski 21'; Pontius 73'; Johnson 90+1'	Report	Terry 32'; Lampard 58'	Attendance: 19,236; Referee: Baldomero Toledo; MVP: Chris Pontius

July 31, 2013 2013 MLS All-Star Game	MLS All-Stars (United States) (Canada)	1–3	(Italy) Roma	Sporting Park, Kansas City, Kansas
20:30	Gonzalez 90+1'	Report	Strootman 4'; Florenzi 47'; Tallo 68'	Attendance: 21,175; Referee: Hilario Grajeda; MVP: Alessandro Florenzi

August 6, 2014 2014 MLS All-Star Game	MLS All-Stars (United States) (Canada)	2–1	(Germany) Bayern Munich	Providence Park, Portland, Oregon
	Wright-Phillips 51'; Donovan 70'	Report	Lewandowski 8'	Attendance: 21,733; Referee: Jair Marrufo; MVP: Landon Donovan

July 29, 2015 2015 MLS All-Star Game	MLS All-Stars (United States) (Canada)	2–1	(England) Tottenham Hotspur	Dick's Sporting Goods Park, Commerce City, Colorado
	Kaká 20' (pen.); Villa 23'	Report	Kane 37'	Attendance: 18,671; Referee: Ismail Elfath; MVP: Kaká

July 28, 2016 2016 MLS All-Star Game	MLS All-Stars (United States) (Canada)	1–2	(England) Arsenal	Avaya Stadium, San Jose, California
	Drogba 45+2'	Report	Campbell 10' (pen.); Akpom 87'	Attendance: 18,000; Referee: Chris Penso; MVP: Chuba Akpom

August 2, 2017 2017 MLS All-Star Game	MLS All-Stars (United States) (Canada)	1–1 (2–4 p)	(Spain) Real Madrid	Soldier Field, Chicago, Illinois
	Dwyer 87'	Report	Mayoral 59'	Attendance: 61,428; Referee: Allen Chapman; MVP: Borja Mayoral
	Penalties
	Dwyer (penalty missed); Dos Santos (penalty missed); Valeri (penalty scored); Almirón (penalty scored)		(penalty scored) Benzema; (penalty scored) Bale; (penalty scored) Kovačić; (penalty scored) Marcelo

August 1, 2018 2018 MLS All-Star Game	MLS All-Stars (United States) (Canada)	1–1 (3–5 p)	(Italy) Juventus	Mercedes-Benz Stadium, Atlanta, Georgia
	Martínez 26'	Report	Favilli 21'	Attendance: 72,317; Referee: Robert Sibiga; MVP: Josef Martínez
	Penalties
	Zusi (penalty scored); Yotún (penalty scored); Valeri (penalty scored); Wright-Phillips (penalty missed)		(penalty scored) Fagioli; (penalty scored) Beltrame; (penalty scored) Kastanos; (penalty scored) Fernandes; (penalty scored) De Sciglio

July 31, 2019 2019 MLS All-Star Game	MLS All-Stars (United States) (Canada)	0–3	(Spain) Atlético Madrid	Exploria Stadium, Orlando, Florida
		Report	Llorente 43'; Félix 85'; Costa 90+3'	Attendance: 25,527; Referee: Drew Fischer; MVP: Marcos Llorente

=== "All-Stars vs. Liga MX All-Stars" (2021–2022) ===
August 25, 2021 2021 MLS All-Star Game	MLS All-Stars (United States) (Canada)	1–1 (3–2 p)	(Mexico) Liga MX All-Stars	Banc of California Stadium, Los Angeles, California
	Murillo 53'	Report	Rodríguez 20'	Attendance: 21,000; Referee: Armando Villarreal; MVP: Matt Turner
	Penalties
	Kreilach (penalty scored); Sallói (penalty scored); Atuesta (penalty missed); Nani (penalty missed); Pepi (penalty scored)		(penalty scored) Sambueza; (penalty missed) Funes Mori; (penalty missed) Lira; (penalty missed) Reyes; (penalty scored) Romo
Note: Originally scheduled for July 29, 2020; postponed due to the COVID-19 pandemic.

August 10, 2022 2022 MLS All-Star Game	MLS All-Stars (United States) (Canada)	2–1	(Mexico) Liga MX All-Stars	Allianz Field, Saint Paul, Minnesota
20:30 ET	Vela 3'; Ruidíaz 73' (pen.)	Report	Álvarez 83'	Attendance: 19,727; Referee: Joe Dickerson; MVP: Dayne St. Clair

=== "All-Stars vs. Europe" (2023) ===
July 19, 2023 2023 MLS All-Star Game	MLS All-Stars (United States) (Canada)	0–5	(England) Arsenal	Audi Field, Washington, D.C.
20:30 ET		Report	Gabriel Jesus 5'; Trossard 23'; Jorginho 48' (pen.); Martinelli 84'; Havertz 89'	Attendance: 20,621; Referee: Ted Unkel; MVP: Bukayo Saka

=== "All-Stars vs. Liga MX All-Stars" (2024–present) ===
July 24, 2024 2024 MLS All-Star Game	MLS All-Stars (United States) (Canada)	1–4	(Mexico) Liga MX All-Stars	Lower.com Field, Columbus, Ohio
20:00 ET	Hernández 17'	Report	Berterame 16'; Idrissi 41'; Brunetta 68'; Meza 69'	Attendance: 20,931; Referee: Guido Gonzales Jr.

July 23, 2025 2025 MLS All-Star Game	MLS All-Stars (United States) (Canada)	3–1	(Mexico) Liga MX All-Stars	Q2 Stadium, Austin, Texas
9:35 ET	Surridge 28'; Baribo 51'; White 80'	Report	Mora 64'	Attendance: 20,738; Referee: Rosendo Mendoza

July 29, 2026 2026 MLS All-Star Game	MLS All-Stars (United States) (Canada)	4–3	(Mexico) Liga MX All-Stars	Bank of America Stadium, Charlotte, North Carolina
8:00 ET	Son Heung-min 20', 23'; Zinckernagel 42'; Evander 58'	Report	Rey 9'; Rondón 55'; Paradela 90+1'	Attendance: 35,197; Referee: Rubiel Vazquez

== Most Valuable Player ==
As of 2026

Ed.	Winner	Nationality	Position	Team	MLS club
1996	Carlos Valderrama	Colombia	Midfielder	(United States) MLS East	Tampa Bay Mutiny
1997	Carlos Valderrama	Colombia	Midfielder	(United States) MLS East	Tampa Bay Mutiny
1998	Brian McBride	United States	Forward	(United States) MLS USA	Columbus Crew
1999	Preki	United States	Midfielder	(United States) MLS West	Kansas City Wizards
2000	Mamadou Diallo	Senegal	Forward	(United States) MLS East	Tampa Bay Mutiny
2001	Landon Donovan	United States	Forward	(United States) MLS West	San Jose Earthquakes
2002	Marco Etcheverry	Bolivia	Forward	(United States) MLS All-Stars	D.C. United
2003	Carlos Ruiz	Guatemala	Forward	(United States) MLS All-Stars	LA Galaxy
2004	Amado Guevara	Honduras	Midfielder	(United States) MLS East	NY/NJ Metrostars
2005	Taylor Twellman	United States	Forward	(United States) MLS All-Stars	New England Revolution
2006	Dwayne De Rosario	Canada	Midfielder	(United States) MLS All-Stars	Houston Dynamo
2007	Juan Pablo Ángel	Colombia	Forward	(Canada) (United States) MLS All-Stars	New York Red Bulls
2008	Cuauhtémoc Blanco	Mexico	Forward	(Canada) (United States) MLS All-Stars	Chicago Fire
2009	Tim Howard	United States	Goalkeeper	(England) Everton	—N/a
2010	Federico Macheda	Italy	Forward	(England) Manchester United	—N/a
2011	Park Ji-sung	South Korea	Midfielder	(England) Manchester United	—N/a
2012	Chris Pontius	United States	Midfielder	(Canada) (United States) MLS All-Stars	D.C. United
2013	Alessandro Florenzi	Italy	Defender	(Italy) Roma	—N/a
2014	Landon Donovan	United States	Forward	(Canada) (United States) MLS All-Stars	LA Galaxy
2015	Kaká	Brazil	Midfielder	(Canada) (United States) MLS All-Stars	Orlando City SC
2016	Chuba Akpom	England	Forward	(England) Arsenal	—N/a
2017	Borja Mayoral	Spain	Forward	(Spain) Real Madrid	—N/a
2018	Josef Martínez	Venezuela	Forward	(Canada) (United States) MLS All-Stars	Atlanta United FC
2019	Marcos Llorente	Spain	Midfielder	(Spain) Atlético Madrid	—N/a
2020	Canceled due to COVID-19 pandemic				
2021	Matt Turner	United States	Goalkeeper	(Canada) (United States) MLS All-Stars	New England Revolution
2022	Dayne St. Clair	Canada	Goalkeeper	(Canada) (United States) MLS All-Stars	Minnesota United FC
2023	Bukayo Saka	England	Forward	(England) Arsenal	—N/a
2024	Juan Brunetta	Argentina	Midfielder	(Mexico) Liga MX All-Stars	—N/a
2025	Tai Baribo	Israel	Forward	(Canada) (United States) MLS All-Stars	Philadelphia Union
2026	Son Heung-min	South Korea	Forward	(Canada) (United States) MLS All-Stars	Los Angeles FC

== Broadcasting ==
Since 2023, rights for the MLS All-Star Game have been held by Apple TV+. The match and associated events are broadcast in English, French, and Spanish on MLS Season Pass; the 2023 edition was made free to stream.

The U.S. broadcast in English alternated between ESPN and Fox from 2015 to 2022, with the networks also alternating the MLS Cup. In even numbered years, ESPN has broadcast the All-Star Game while Fox would broadcast the MLS Cup. Likewise, in odd numbered years, Fox would be slated to broadcast the All-Star Game while ESPN or its sister network, ABC beginning in 2019, would broadcast the MLS Cup.

== See also ==
- NBA All-Star Game
- MLB All-Star Game
- NHL All-Star Game
