= 2016 MLS All-Star Game =

Soccer game played in San Jose, California

2016 AT&T MLS All-Star Game
- Event: 2016 Major League Soccer season
| MLS All-Stars | Arsenal |
| (United States) (Canada) | (England) |
| 1 | 2 |
- Date: July 28, 2016
- Venue: PayPal Park, San Jose, California
- Most Valuable Player: Chuba Akpom (Arsenal)
- Referee: Chris Penso (United States)
- Attendance: 18,000
- Weather: Clear, 84 °F (29 °C)

The 2016 Major League Soccer All-Star Game, the 21st annual Major League Soccer All-Star Game, took place on July 28, 2016 (7:30 p.m. EDT, 4:30 p.m. local time) at Avaya Stadium, the home of the San Jose Earthquakes. The game was televised live on ESPN and Univision in the United States, and on TSN and RDS in Canada. The game featured the MLS All-Star team playing English side Arsenal, with the match being a preseason friendly for Arsenal as part of their tour of California.

Chuba Akpom was named MVP.

== Background ==
The Major League Soccer (MLS) All-Star Game is an annual exhibition game played by a selection of players from the league's teams. It began in 1996 with the Eastern Conference and Western Conference fielding their own teams, similar to other major North American sports. After numerous format changes, the 2003 edition saw the format change again to matchup Mexican club Guadalajara against the "MLS All-Stars", a team with the best players competing in MLS. After reverting to the original format in 2004, the "MLS All-Stars" had since played various club teams from across the world, including Premier League clubs Manchester United and Chelsea.

MLS announced in May 2015 that Avaya Stadium, the home stadium of the San Jose Earthquakes, would host the 21st edition of the MLS All-Star Game. In February 2016, it was announced that Premier League side Arsenal were set to play the MLS All-Stars on July 28. Telecommunications company AT&T sponsored the game and the match was broadcast live in the United States through ESPN and Univision; it was also available internationally in over 100 countries.

== Squads ==
=== MLS All-Stars ===
The MLS All Star Fan XI was announced on July 9, 2016, however members of this XI were not guaranteed a slot in the 22 man game day squad.

Note: Flags indicate national team as defined under FIFA eligibility rules; some limited exceptions apply. Players may hold more than one non-FIFA nationality.

| No. | Pos. | Nation | Player |
|---|---|---|---|
| 1 | GK | JAM | Andre Blake (Philadelphia Union) |
| 2 | FW | USA | Clint Dempsey (Seattle Sounders FC) |
| 3 | DF | USA | Brandon Vincent (Chicago Fire) |
| 4 | DF | CRC | Kendall Waston (Vancouver Whitecaps FC) |
| 6 | MF | USA | Darlington Nagbe (Portland Timbers) |
| 7 | FW | ESP | David Villa (New York City FC) |
| 8 | FW | USA | Chris Wondolowski (San Jose Earthquakes) |
| 9 | FW | CAN | Cyle Larin (Orlando City SC) |
| 10 | FW | ITA | Sebastian Giovinco (Toronto FC) |
| 11 | FW | CIV | Didier Drogba (Montreal Impact) |
| 12 | DF | USA | Keegan Rosenberry (Philadelphia Union) |
| 13 | MF | USA | Jermaine Jones^{a} (Colorado Rapids) |
| 14 | DF | USA | Andrew Farrell (New England Revolution) |
| 15 | DF | USA | Steve Birnbaum (D.C. United) |
| 16 | MF | USA | Sacha Kljestan (New York Red Bulls) |

| No. | Pos. | Nation | Player |
|---|---|---|---|
| 17 | MF | MEX | Giovanni Dos Santos (LA Galaxy) |
| 18 | DF | USA | Matt Besler^{a} (Sporting Kansas City) |
| 19 | DF | ENG | Liam Ridgewell^{a} (Portland Timbers) |
| 20 | MF | USA | Wil Trapp (Columbus Crew SC) |
| 21 | MF | ITA | Andrea Pirlo (New York City FC) |
| 22 | MF | BRA | Kaká (Orlando City SC) |
| 23 | DF | BEL | Laurent Ciman (Montreal Impact) |
| 24 | GK | PUR | Josh Saunders (New York City FC) |
| 25 | MF | USA | Kyle Beckerman (Real Salt Lake) |
| 28 | FW | ARG | Ignacio Piatti (Montreal Impact) |
| 29 | MF | ARG | Mauro Diaz (FC Dallas) |
| 34 | GK | USA | David Bingham (San Jose Earthquakes) |
| 37 | DF | BEL | Jelle Van Damme (LA Galaxy) |
| 95 | DF | USA | Kellyn Acosta (FC Dallas) |

Notes:

^{a} Injured or otherwise unable to play.

=== Arsenal ===
On July 22 Arsenal announced a 25-man traveling squad for the MLS All-Star game:

Note: Flags indicate national team as defined under FIFA eligibility rules; some limited exceptions apply. Players may hold more than one non-FIFA nationality.

| No. | Pos. | Nation | Player |
|---|---|---|---|
| 2 | DF | FRA | Mathieu Debuchy |
| 3 | DF | ENG | Kieran Gibbs |
| 4 | DF | GER | Per Mertesacker ^{[a]} |
| 5 | DF | BRA | Gabriel |
| 10 | MF | ENG | Jack Wilshere |
| 13 | GK | COL | David Ospina |
| 14 | FW | ENG | Theo Walcott |
| 15 | MF | ENG | Alex Oxlade-Chamberlain |
| 16 | DF | ENG | Rob Holding |
| 17 | FW | NGR | Alex Iwobi |
| 18 | DF | ESP | Nacho Monreal |
| 19 | MF | ESP | Santi Cazorla |
| 21 | DF | ENG | Calum Chambers |

| No. | Pos. | Nation | Player |
|---|---|---|---|
| 24 | DF | ESP | Héctor Bellerín |
| 26 | GK | ARG | Emiliano Martínez |
| 28 | FW | CRC | Joel Campbell |
| 29 | MF | SUI | Granit Xhaka |
| 31 | MF | FRA | Jeff Reine-Adélaïde ^{[b]} |
| 32 | FW | ENG | Chuba Akpom |
| 33 | GK | CZE | Petr Čech |
| 34 | MF | FRA | Francis Coquelin |
| 35 | MF | EGY | Mohamed Elneny |
| 37 | MF | POL | Krystian Bielik ^{[b]} |
| 40 | MF | USA | Gedion Zelalem ^{[b]} |
| 68 | FW | ENG | Chris Willock ^{[b]} |

Notes:

^{a} Injured or otherwise unable to play.
^{b} Development Squad

== Match ==
2016 MLS All-Star Game
July 28, 2016
4:30 p.m. PDT

| MLS All-Stars (United States) (Canada) | 1–2 | (England) Arsenal |
|---|---|---|
| Drogba 45+2' | Report | Campbell 11' (pen.); Akpom 87' |

Avaya Stadium, San Jose, California
Attendance: 18,000
Referee: Chris Penso (United States)

| MLS All-Stars | Arsenal |

| GK | 1 | (Jamaica) Andre Blake | | (substituted off) 45' |
| DF | 12 | (United States) Keegan Rosenberry | | (substituted off) 45' |
| DF | 23 | (Belgium) Laurent Ciman | (yellow card) 10' | (substituted off) 45' |
| DF | 37 | (Belgium) Jelle Van Damme | | (substituted off) 45' |
| DF | 95 | (United States) Kellyn Acosta | | (substituted off) 57' |
| MF | 21 | (Italy) Andrea Pirlo | | (substituted off) 32' |
| MF | 25 | (United States) Kyle Beckerman | | (substituted off) 45' |
| MF | 17 | (Mexico) Giovani dos Santos | | (substituted off) 45' |
| MF | 22 | (Brazil) Kaká (c) | | (substituted off) 45' |
| FW | 7 | (Spain) David Villa | | (substituted off) 33' |
| FW | 11 | (Ivory Coast) Didier Drogba | | (substituted off) 45' |
Substitutes:
| GK | 34 | (United States) David Bingham | | (substituted on) 45' |
| DF | 3 | (United States) Brandon Vincent | | (substituted on) 57' |
| DF | 4 | (Costa Rica) Kendall Waston | | (substituted on) 45' |
| DF | 14 | (United States) Andrew Farrell | | (substituted on) 45' |
| DF | 15 | (United States) Steve Birnbaum | | (substituted on) 45' |
| MF | 2 | (United States) Clint Dempsey | | (substituted on) 73' |
| MF | 6 | (United States) Darlington Nagbe | | (substituted on) 45' |
| MF | 8 | (United States) Chris Wondolowski | | (substituted on) 73' |
| MF | 16 | (United States) Sacha Kljestan | | (substituted on) 32' (substituted off) 73' |
| MF | 20 | (United States) Wil Trapp | | (substituted on) 45' |
| MF | 28 | (Argentina) Ignacio Piatti | | (substituted on) 33' (substituted off) 73' |
| MF | 29 | (Argentina) Mauro Díaz | | (substituted on) 45' |
| FW | 9 | (Canada) Cyle Larin | | (substituted on) 77' |
| FW | 10 | (Italy) Sebastian Giovinco | | (substituted on) 45' (substituted off) 77' |
Manager:
(United States) Dominic Kinnear

| GK | 33 | (Czech Republic) Petr Čech (c) | (substituted off) 67' |
| DF | 2 | (France) Mathieu Debuchy | (substituted off) 45' |
| DF | 16 | (England) Rob Holding |
| DF | 37 | (Poland) Krystian Bielik | (substituted off) 45' |
| DF | 3 | (England) Kieran Gibbs | (substituted off) 45' |
| MF | 35 | (Egypt) Mohamed Elneny | (substituted off) 67' |
| MF | 34 | (France) Francis Coquelin | (substituted off) 45' |
| MF | 10 | (England) Jack Wilshere | (substituted off) 45' |
| MF | 15 | (England) Alex Oxlade-Chamberlain | (substituted off) 67' |
| MF | 28 | (Costa Rica) Joel Campbell | (substituted off) 68' |
| FW | 14 | (England) Theo Walcott | (substituted off) 67' |
Substitutes:
| GK | 26 | (Argentina) Emiliano Martínez | (substituted on) 67' |
| DF | 18 | (Spain) Nacho Monreal | (substituted on) 45' |
| DF | 21 | (England) Calum Chambers | (substituted on) 45' |
| DF | 24 | (Spain) Héctor Bellerín | (substituted on) 45' |
| MF | 17 | (Nigeria) Alex Iwobi | (substituted on) 45' |
| MF | 29 | (Switzerland) Granit Xhaka | (substituted on) 45' |
| MF | 31 | (France) Jeff Reine-Adélaïde | (substituted on) 68' |
| MF | 40 | (United States) Gedion Zelalem | (substituted on) 67' |
| FW | 32 | (England) Chuba Akpom | (substituted on) 67' |
| FW | 68 | (England) Chris Willock | (substituted on) 67' |
Manager:
(France) Arsène Wenger

Most valuable player:
(England) Chuba Akpom (Arsenal)

Assistant referees:
Frank Anderson
Matthew Nelson
Fourth official:
Juan Guzman
Fifth official:
Chris Strickland

Match rules

- 90 minutes.
- Unlimited substitutions.
- No extra time.
- Penalty shoot-out if scores still level.
