= 2023 MLS All-Star Game =

Soccer exhibition match in Washington, D.C., U.S.

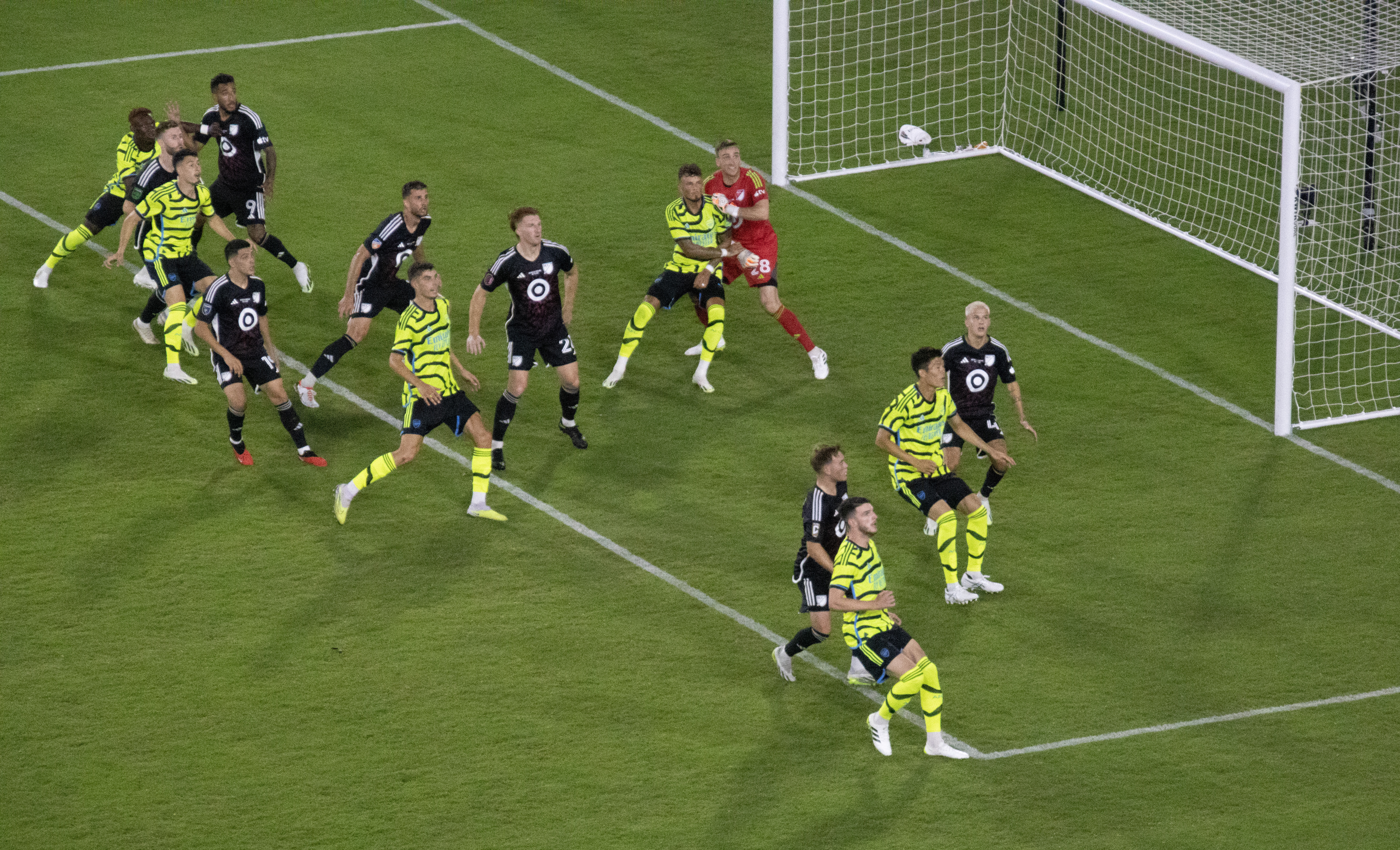
- MLS All-Star players defending an Arsenal corner
- Event: 2023 Major League Soccer season
MLS All-Stars	Arsenal
(United States) (Canada)	(England)
0	5
- Date: July 19, 2023
- Venue: Audi Field, Washington, D.C.
- Most Valuable Player: Bukayo Saka (Arsenal)
- Referee: Ted Unkel (United States)
- Attendance: 20,621

The 2023 Major League Soccer All-Star Game was the 27th annual Major League Soccer All-Star Game, an exhibition soccer match in the United States. The game, featuring an all-star team from Major League Soccer (MLS) and Premier League club Arsenal, was played on July 19, 2023, at Audi Field in Washington, D.C. The all-star game also included a skills challenge, concerts, and other events in the days before the match.

The 2023 edition marked a return to the former All-Star Game format that pitted the MLS All-Stars against a European club on their preseason tour; the 2021 and 2022 editions had been played against the Liga MX All-Stars. Arsenal won 5–0 and set a new record for largest margin of victory in the MLS All-Star Game.

== Background ==
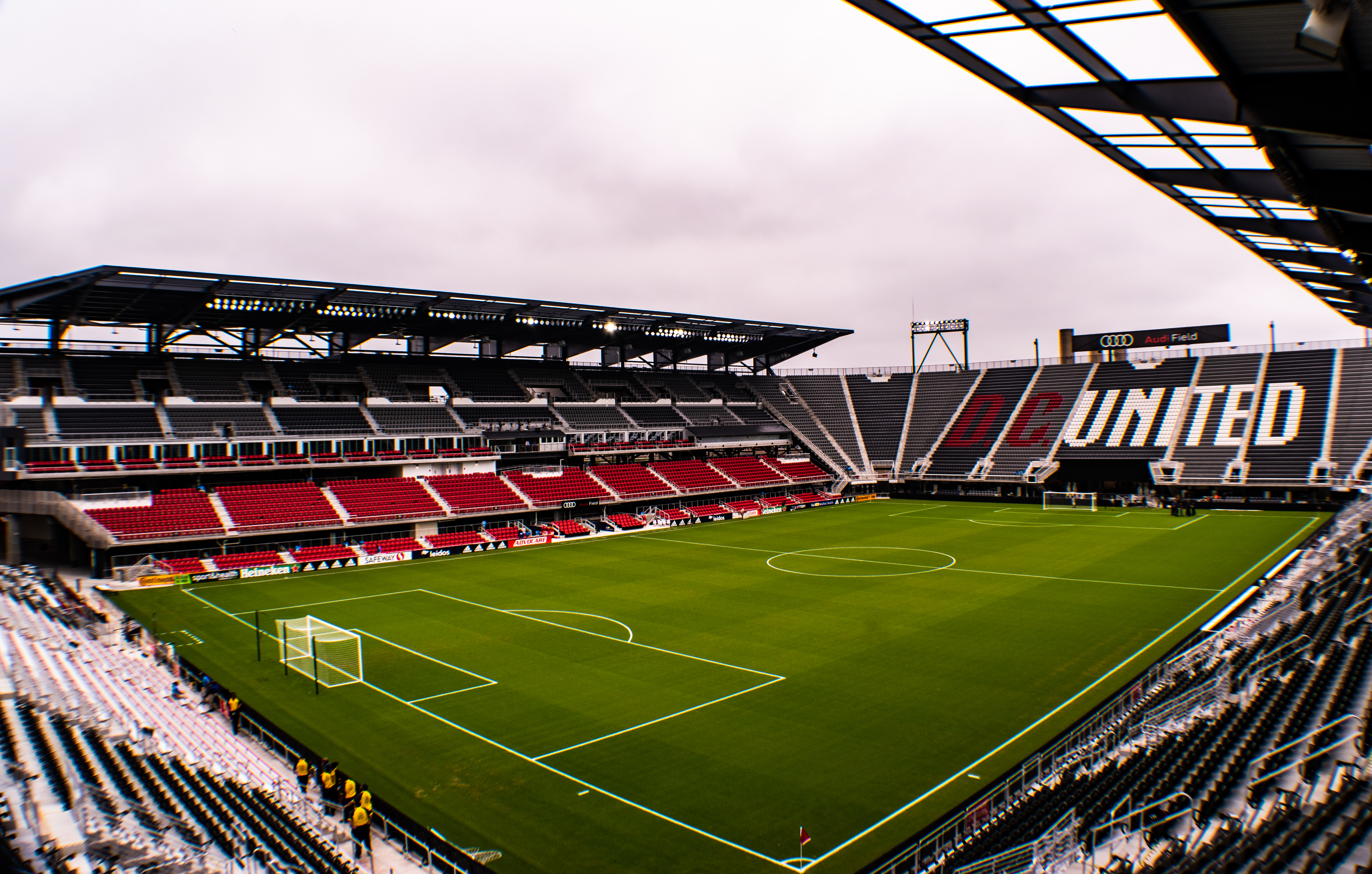
The game was played at Audi Field in Washington, D.C.

On June 23, 2022, MLS announced that the 2023 All-Star Game would be played at Audi Field in Washington, D.C. It is the first All-Star Game to be played at the 20,000-seat venue, the home of D.C. United since 2018, and the third in Washington, D.C. after two editions were played at RFK Memorial Stadium. While the MLS All-Stars played the Liga MX All-Stars for the 2021 and 2022 editions of the match, the league chose to return to their former format—playing against a European club in their preseason. English club Arsenal were announced as the opponents for 2023; it was their second time playing the MLS All-Stars, following their 2–1 win in the 2016 edition.

== Pre-match ==
=== Roster selection ===
D.C. United head coach Wayne Rooney, a former All-Star participant and opponent, was the head coach of the MLS All-Star team. Online voting for fans, media personnel, and MLS players to select the MLS All-Star roster began on May 31, 2023. Eligibility for the vote was limited to players who had appeared in at least half of regular season matches through May 18; 12 slots were determined by the vote, while 12 were selected by Rooney and an additional two by MLS commissioner Don Garber. The roster was announced on June 27; among the selections were commissioner's picks Kei Kamara, a league veteran, and homegrown player Mathieu Choinière from CF Montréal. Lionel Messi, who announced in early June that he planned to sign with Inter Miami CF, was not included on the roster despite media reports that the league and Apple hoped he would be involved in the event ahead of his official club debut.

=== Jersey ===
The MLS All-Stars jersey was designed by Adidas and released on June 27, 2023. It is primarily black and features white stripes and trim as well as a faded red star that emanates from the center, occupied by a sponsor logo for Target. The back collar includes a tag reading "ASG23" that resembles the flag of Washington, D.C.

== Other events ==
The MLS All-Star Skills Challenge took place on July 18, 2023, at Audi Field. The event featured players from both the MLS All-Star Game and Arsenal who participated in five competitions: a shooting challenge; a touch challenge; a cross and volley challenge; a passing challenge; and a crossbar challenge. Arsenal won the Skills Challenge 4–1 with the winning crossbar challenge shot scored from 40 yards (37 m) by American defender Auston Trusty, a former MLS player. "Goalie Wars", a scoring challenge between two goalkeepers, returned with four MLS Next Pro players; Isaac Walker of Crown Legacy FC won against Damian Las from Austin FC II in the final.

The MLS Next All-Star Game, an exhibition game for MLS Next academy and youth players, was played on July 19 at the Glenn Warner Soccer Facility on the grounds of the United States Naval Academy in Annapolis, Maryland. The West team won 5–4 in a penalty shootout against the East following a 2–2 draw. The same venue also hosted a Special Olympics exhibition game between all-star teams. Additional events in the Washington, D.C. area during the All-Star Week included festivals and an MLS All-Star Concert with Kehlani.

== Broadcasting ==
The All-Star Game and Skills Challenge were broadcast globally in English, French, and Spanish on MLS Season Pass, an online streaming platform operated by Apple TV with rights to all MLS matches. The All-Star Game and Skills Challenge were broadcast for free with an account, rather than requiring a paid subscription. For the events, more than 25 fixed cameras were installed around Audi Field and several players wore body cameras for use in replays. The English broadcast comprised Jake Zivin as play-by-play commentator with Taylor Twellman and Kaylyn Kyle as analysts.

== Squads ==
=== MLS All-Stars ===
The MLS All-Stars roster was announced on June 27, 2023. The rosters for the All-Star Skills Challenge were announced on July 6.

Note: Flags indicate national team as defined under FIFA eligibility rules; some limited exceptions apply. Players may hold more than one non-FIFA nationality.

No.	Pos.	Nation	Player
—	GK	SUI	Roman Bürki ‡ (St. Louis City SC)
—	GK	USA	Tyler Miller ‡ (D.C. United)
—	GK	SRB	Đorđe Petrović (New England Revolution)
—	DF	ARM	Lucas Zelarayán (Columbus Crew)
—	DF	ARG	Álvaro Barreal (FC Cincinnati)
—	DF	USA	Ryan Hollingshead (Los Angeles FC)
—	DF	IRL	Jon Gallagher (Austin FC)
—	DF	USA	Matt Miazga (FC Cincinnati)
—	DF	USA	Walker Zimmerman (Nashville SC)
—	DF	USA	Tim Parker (St. Louis City SC)
—	DF	USA	John Tolkin (New York Red Bulls)
—	DF	NOR	Jakob Glesnes (Philadelphia Union)
—	MF	ARG	Thiago Almada ‡ (Atlanta United FC)
—	MF	CAN	Mathieu Choinière (CF Montréal)

No.	Pos.	Nation	Player
—	MF	MEX	Héctor Herrera ‡ (Houston Dynamo FC)
—	MF	VEN	José Martínez (Philadelphia Union)
—	MF	ESP	Riqui Puig ‡ (LA Galaxy)
—	MF	USA	Aidan Morris (Columbus Crew)
—	MF	ARG	Luciano Acosta ‡ (FC Cincinnati)
—	MF	GER	Hany Mukhtar ‡ (Nashville SC)
—	MF	ESP	Carles Gil (New England Revolution)
—	FW	SLE	Kei Kamara (Chicago Fire FC)
—	FW	USA	Jesús Ferreira ‡ (FC Dallas)
—	FW	GRE	Giorgos Giakoumakis (Atlanta United FC)
—	FW	BEL	Christian Benteke ‡ (D.C. United)
—	FW	USA	Jordan Morris (Seattle Sounders FC)
—	FW	GAB	Denis Bouanga ‡ (Los Angeles FC)
—	FW	ARG	Cristian Espinoza (San Jose Earthquakes)

- Coach: (England) Wayne Rooney (D.C. United)

‡ marks players who are also on the All-Star Skills Challenge roster

== Match ==
2023 MLS All-Star Game
July 19, 2023
8:30 p.m. EDT

MLS All-Stars (United States) (Canada)	0–5	(England) Arsenal
	Report	Gabriel Jesus 5'; Trossard 23'; Jorginho 48' (pen.); Martinelli 84'; Havertz 89'

Audi Field, Washington, D.C.
Attendance: 20,621
Referee: Ted Unkel (United States)

MLS All-Stars	Arsenal

GK	1	(Switzerland) Roman Bürki		(substituted off) 34'
RB	24	(United States) Ryan Hollingshead		(substituted off) 46'
CB	3	(Norway) Jakob Glesnes	(yellow card) 45+6'	(substituted off) 46'
CB	25	(United States) Walker Zimmerman		(substituted off) 46'
LB	31	(Argentina) Álvaro Barreal	(yellow card) 18'	(substituted off) 46'
CM	6	(Spain) Riqui Puig		(substituted off) 33'
CM	8	(Venezuela) José Andrés Martínez	(yellow card) 13'	(substituted off) 34'
CM	10	(Germany) Hany Mukhtar		(substituted off) 33'
RF	99	(Gabon) Denis Bouanga		(substituted off) 33'
CF	20	(Belgium) Christian Benteke		(substituted off) 33'
LF	11	(Argentina) Luciano Acosta		(substituted off) 46'
Substitutes:
GK	12	(Serbia) Đorđe Petrović			(substituted on) 69'
GK	28	(United States) Tyler Miller		(substituted on) 34'	(substituted off) 69'
DF	17	(Republic of Ireland) Jon Gallagher		(substituted on) 46'
DF	21	(United States) Matt Miazga		(substituted on) 46'
DF	26	(United States) Tim Parker		(substituted on) 46'
DF	47	(United States) John Tolkin		(substituted on) 46'
MF	5	(United States) Aidan Morris		(substituted on) 34'	(substituted off) 69'
MF	16	(Mexico) Héctor Herrera			(substituted on) 68'
MF	19	(Argentina) Cristian Espinoza		(substituted on) 33'	(substituted off) 68'
MF	22	(Spain) Carles Gil		(substituted on) 33'	(substituted off) 69'
MF	23	(Argentina) Thiago Almada	(yellow card) 45+3'	(substituted on) 33'	(substituted off) 69'
MF	29	(Canada) Mathieu Choinière			(substituted on) 69'
MF	30	(Armenia) Lucas Zelarayán		(substituted on) 46'
FW	7	(Greece) Giorgos Giakoumakis			(substituted on) 69'
FW	9	(United States) Jesús Ferreira		(substituted on) 33'	(substituted off) 69'
FW	13	(United States) Jordan Morris			(substituted on) 69'
FW	38	(Sierra Leone) Kei Kamara			(substituted on) 69'
Manager:
(England) Wayne Rooney

GK	1	(England) Aaron Ramsdale		(substituted off) 46'
RB	4	(England) Ben White		(substituted off) 80'
CB	2	(France) William Saliba		(substituted off) 64'
CB	6	(Brazil) Gabriel	(yellow card) 21'	(substituted off) 65'
LB	15	(Poland) Jakub Kiwior		(substituted off) 64'
CM	21	(Portugal) Fábio Vieira		(substituted off) 65'
CM	20	(Italy) Jorginho		(substituted off) 65'
CM	19	(Belgium) Leandro Trossard		(substituted off) 56'
RF	7	(England) Bukayo Saka		(substituted off) 46'
CF	9	(Brazil) Gabriel Jesus		(substituted off) 65'
LF	14	(England) Eddie Nketiah		(substituted off) 46'
Substitutes:
GK	13	(Iceland) Rúnar Alex Rúnarsson
GK	31	(Estonia) Karl Hein		(substituted on) 46'
DF	3	(Scotland) Kieran Tierney		(substituted on) 64'
DF	12	(Netherlands) Jurriën Timber		(substituted on) 64'
DF	16	(England) Rob Holding
DF	18	(Japan) Takehiro Tomiyasu		(substituted on) 65'
DF	32	(United States) Auston Trusty		(substituted on) 80'
MF	8	(Norway) Martin Ødegaard		(substituted on) 46'
MF	29	(Germany) Kai Havertz	(yellow card) 61'	(substituted on) 46'
MF	41	(England) Declan Rice		(substituted on) 65'
MF	45	(England) Amario Cozier-Duberry
FW	11	(Brazil) Gabriel Martinelli		(substituted on) 56'
FW	26	(United States) Folarin Balogun		(substituted on) 65'
FW	27	(Brazil) Marquinhos		(substituted on) 65'
Manager:
(Spain) Mikel Arteta

Most valuable player:
(England) Bukayo Saka (Arsenal)

Assistant referees:
Ian McKay
Jeffrey Greeson
Fourth official:
Rubiel Vazquez
Video assistant referee
Geoff Gamble
Assistant video assistant referee
TJ Zablocki

Match rules

- 90 minutes
- Penalty shoot-out if scores level after 90 minutes
- Unlimited substitutions (Note: Each team was given only three opportunities to make substitutions, excluding substitutions made at half-time.)

== Post-match ==
Arsenal's Bukayo Saka was named the match's most valuable player.

MLS All-Stars manager Wayne Rooney criticized the lack of preparation time prior to the match, adding that they "literally had no time whatsoever to do any tactics". The team had also trained in public at the National Mall over his objections. In a post-game press conference, Rooney said that he learned "absolutely nothing" from the match as a coach and also criticized referee Ted Unkel, who had shown six yellow cards—a record for an MLS All-Star Game. He also stated that several members of his technical staff recording the match for technical analysis were ejected from their seats by Apple TV staff; the league office denied that any Apple staff had moved into the technical area.
