= 2003 MLS All-Star Game =

Soccer game played in Carson, California

Pepsi MLS All-Star Game 2003
- Event: 2003 Major League Soccer season
MLS All-Stars	Guadalajara
(United States)	(Mexico)
3	1
- Date: August 2, 2003
- Venue: Home Depot Center, Carson, California
- Man of the Match: Carlos Ruiz (MLS All-Stars)
- Referee: Kevin Terry
- Attendance: 27,000
- Weather: Clear, 81°F

The 2003 Major League Soccer All-Star Game was the 8th Major League Soccer All-Star Game, played on August 2, 2003 at The Home Depot Center, now known as Dignity Health Sports Park, in Carson, California. The All-Star Game celebrated both the opening of the league's second soccer-specific stadium that season, as well as the announcement of the league's expansion with an eleventh team purchased by the owners of Mexico's Club Deportivo Guadalajara. Then-MetroStars head coach Bob Bradley was tapped to lead the MLS All-Stars against Guadalajara, commonly known as Chivas, and led by their head coach, Eduardo de la Torre.

A scoreless first half was marked by a defensive effort for the All-Stars. The Los Angeles Galaxy's Kevin Hartman made several key saves, while a backline led by Carlos Bocanegra of the Chicago Fire weathered a persistent Chivas attack. The Fire's Ante Razov scored the first goal in the second half thanks in part to a feed by the San Jose Earthquakes' Landon Donovan past a beaten Oswaldo Sánchez. Jair Garcia broke away from the defense and beat Hartman to tie the game, but the All-Stars responded shortly thereafter with the eventual-game winner by the Galaxy's Carlos Ruiz. The Fire's DaMarcus Beasley tipped in the All-Stars' third goal, which Chivas contested because of an assistant referee's offside call, which was waved off by Kevin Terry. A sellout crowd at The Home Depot Center celebrated the win, as well as the awarding of MVP to local favorite Carlos Ruiz.

== Details ==
2003 MLS All-Star Game
August 2, 2003

MLS All-Stars (United States)	3–1	(Mexico) Guadalajara
Razov 57'; Ruiz 68'; Beasley 83'	Report	García 66'

Home Depot Center, Carson, California
Attendance: 27,000
Referee: Kevin Terry
