= 2005 MLS All-Star Game =

Soccer game played in Columbus, Ohio

Sierra Mist MLS All-Star Game 2005
- Event: 2005 Major League Soccer season
MLS All-Stars	Fulham
(United States)	(England)
4	1
- Date: July 30, 2005
- Venue: Columbus Crew Stadium, Columbus, Ohio
- Man of the Match: Taylor Twellman (New England Revolution)
- Referee: Ricardo Valenzuela
- Attendance: 23,309
- Weather: Sunny, 82°F

The 2005 Major League Soccer All-Star Game was the 10th Major League Soccer All-Star Game, played on July 30, 2005 at Columbus Crew Stadium in Columbus, Ohio between the MLS All-Stars and Fulham of England. The MLS All-Stars earned a 4–1 victory.

Halftime entertainment was provided by Bowling for Soup.

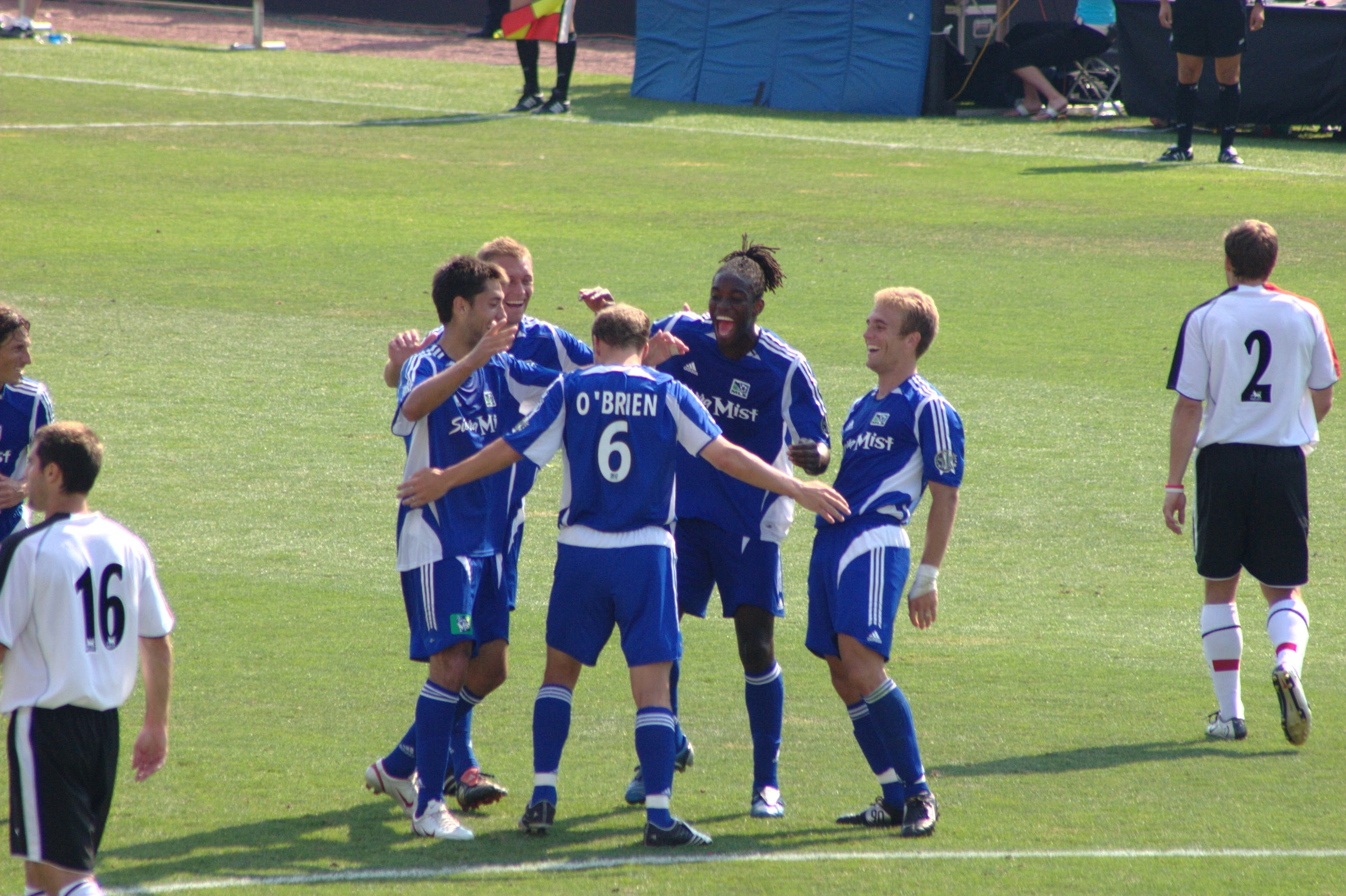
MLS All-Stars celebrate a goal in the 2005 game versus Fulham of the Premier League

== Match details ==
2005 MLS All-Star Game
July 30, 2005

MLS All-Stars (United States)	4–1	(England) Fulham
Twellman 23'; O’Brien 56'; Cunningham 85', 89'	Report	Jensen 36' (pen.)

Columbus Crew Stadium, Columbus
Attendance: 23,309
Referee: Ricardo Valenzuela

MLS All-Stars
Fulham

GK	(United States) Matt Reis	(substituted off) 89'
DF	(United States) Chris Albright	(substituted off) 46'
DF	(United States) Jimmy Conrad
DF	(United States) Greg Vanney
DF	(United States) Frankie Hejduk
MF	(Republic of Ireland) Ronnie O'Brien	(substituted off) 84'
MF	(Grenada) Shalrie Joseph
MF	(Finland) Simo Valakari
FW	(United States) Clint Dempsey
FW	(United States) Taylor Twellman	(substituted off) 75'
FW	(United States) Landon Donovan	(substituted off) 64'
Substitutes:
DF	(Honduras) Iván Guerrero	(substituted on) 46'
MF	(Argentina) Christian Gómez	(substituted on) 64'
FW	(United States) Brad Davis	(substituted on) 65'
FW	(United States) Jeff Cunningham	(substituted on) 68'
GK	(United States) Scott Garlick	(substituted on) 89'
Manager:
(Northern Ireland) Colin Clarke

GK	(England) Mark Crossley	(substituted off) 31'
DF	(Germany) Moritz Volz
DF	(United States) Carlos Bocanegra	(substituted off) 61'
DF	(England) Zat Knight
DF	(Denmark) Niclas Jensen
MF	(Belgium) Steed Malbranque	(substituted off) 68'
MF	(Denmark) Claus Jensen
MF	(England) Zesh Rehman	(substituted off) 75'
FW	(Portugal) Luís Boa Morte
FW	(United States) Brian McBride	(substituted off) 61'
FW	(Canada) Tomasz Radzinski	(substituted off) 68'
Substitutes:
GK	(Czech Republic) Jaroslav Drobný	(substituted on) 31'
DF	(France) Alain Goma	(substituted on) 61'
MF	(France) Sylvain Legwinski	(substituted on) 75'
FW	(Liberia) Collins John	(substituted on) 61'
FW	(Iceland) Heiðar Helguson	(substituted on) 68'
FW	(Australia) Ahmad Elrich	(substituted on) 89'
Manager:
(Wales) Chris Coleman
