= Ricardo Valenzuela (referee) =

American soccer referee

- Full name: Ricardo Andres Valenzuela
- Born: February 7, 1964 (age 62)
- Other occupation: Schoolteacher

Domestic
Years	League	Role
1998–2005	Major League Soccer	Referee

International
Years	League	Role
1999–2005	FIFA	Referee

Ricardo Andres Valenzuela (born February 7, 1964) is a United States former soccer referee from Richmond, California, who officiated for the U.S. Soccer Federation in various leagues and competitions, as assigned. He was also a FIFA referee. His other occupation is as a schoolteacher.

== Career ==
He first took up refereeing in 1982, officiating in youth soccer in New Mexico, and progressed to become a FIFA referee in 1999. In the lead-up to the 1999 FIFA Women's World Cup tournament, he was appointed to a friendly match between the United States and Canada at the Civic Stadium, Oregon, on June 6, 1999, which finished 4–2 to the USA women.

On July 13 of that year, he also oversaw the representative friendly at the Mile High Stadium, Denver, Colorado, between the United States men's national soccer team and Derby County, from the East Midlands of England, which the United States won 2–1.

He was in charge of one of the semi-finals in the 2001 U.S. Open Cup, between Los Angeles Galaxy and Chicago Fire at Titan Stadium, Fullerton, California, on August 22, 2001, when Galaxy beat Fire 1–0 after overtime, and went on to win the tournament.

On December 21, 2003, Valenzuela was given control of the UNCAF Tournament Final at the Los Angeles Memorial Coliseum in California, played between Deportivo Saprissa of Costa Rica, and Comunicaciones of Guatemala, and which Deportivo won 3–2.

Amongst his work for FIFA, he refereed a 2002 FIFA World Cup qualifying game in Tegucigalpa on October 8, 2000 between Honduras and Jamaica, which finished 1–0 to the home side, and four years later was appointed to three 2006 FIFA World Cup qualification matches in the CONCACAF region. As well as being fourth official to Kevin Stott for the Haiti against Turks & Caicos Preliminary Round match on February 18, 2004, he took charge of the return match in the Turks & Caicos Islands on February 22, 2004, which ended 2–0 to Haiti. Later in the year, on October 10, 2004, he was referee for Trinidad & Tobago's 5–1 home win at the Dwight Yorke Stadium over St. Kitts & Nevis in the Semifinal Round of the same competition.

In later years, he took charge of such prestige matches as the MLS All-Star Game on July 30, 2005 in the Columbus Crew Stadium, Ohio, against Fulham from London, England, which finished 4–1 to MLS.

Valenzuela had retired from refereeing by late 2006, leaving the FIFA list at the end of 2005.
