= Adidas Torfabrik =

Brand of association football balls

The Adidas Torfabrik (English: "Goal factory") is a family and brand of association football balls. Used as official match balls of Bundesliga between 2010 and 2018, returning from 2026 onwards, the Torfabrik balls, in order to distinguish them in their construction, have had the year of adoption in their names.

== History ==
The first version of Torfabrik, the official match ball of 2010–11 Bundesliga, used the same technology and design of Adidas Jabulani, in fact, for this reason was also nicknamed Jabulani Torfabrik. The winter version of this model was orange. The official match ball of 2011–12 Bundesliga, although the decoration template was similar to that of the previous season, was based on the new Adidas Tango 12, the new standard technology of Adidas footballs. The winter version of this model was red. In order to celebrate the 50th anniversary of Bundesliga, Adidas created a special design for 2012–13 Bundesliga official match ball. The winter version of this model was red. For 2013–14 Bundesliga was adopted as official match ball a variant of Adidas Cafusa with a silver decoration. The winter version of this model was yellow. As official match ball of 2014–15 Bundesliga Adidas presented a variant of Adidas Brazuca, the new standard technology of Adidas footballs, with a red and silver decoration. The winter version of this model was yellow. The official match ball of 2015–16 Bundesliga showed an orange template, with the same shape of Adidas Conext 15 balls. The winter version of this model was orange. The official match ball of 2016–17 Bundesliga had a silver decoration, arranged in the same template as the balls that replaced the line started with Brazuca, which was first used for Adidas Beau Jeu. The winter version of this model was orange. The official match ball of 2017–18 Bundesliga adopted a green version of the same template as the balls that replaced the line of Adidas Conext 15, which was first used for Adidas Krasava. The winter version of this model was orange. As the official match ball for the 2018–19 Bundesliga, Adidas presented a new version of Torfabrik based on the technology developed with Adidas Telstar 18; however, the ball was never used due to the non-renewal of the contract with Adidas, which was replaced by Select Sport as the official sponsor of the German football championship. In June 2026, Adidas returned the sponsorship back along with the Torfabrik brand for the 2026-27 season. The new ball featured the same technology as the Adidas Trionda, with a red design based on the Adidas Conext 26.

== Gallery ==
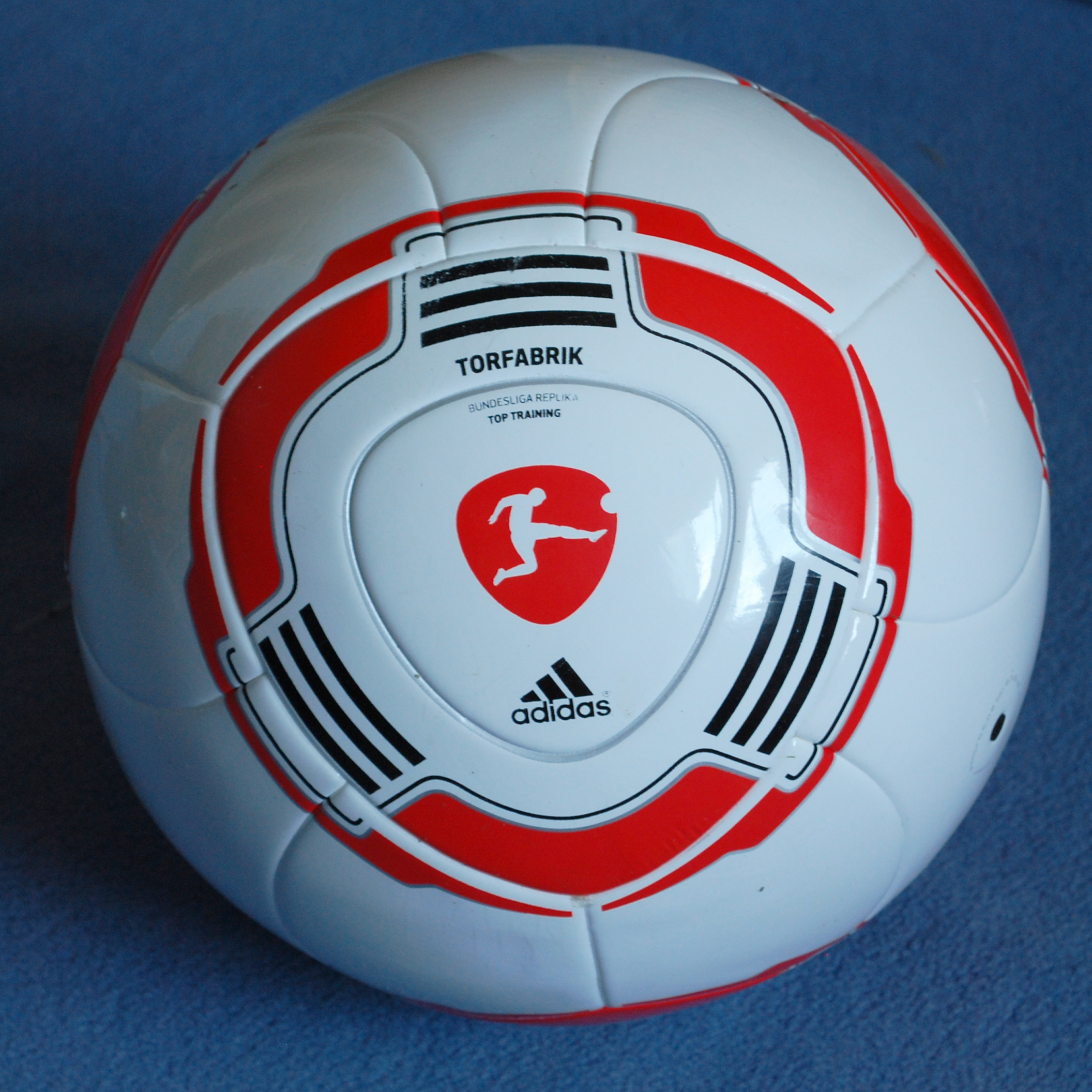
Torfabrik 2010–11

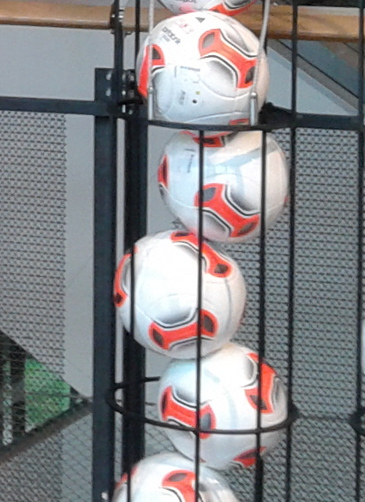
Torfabrik 2012–13

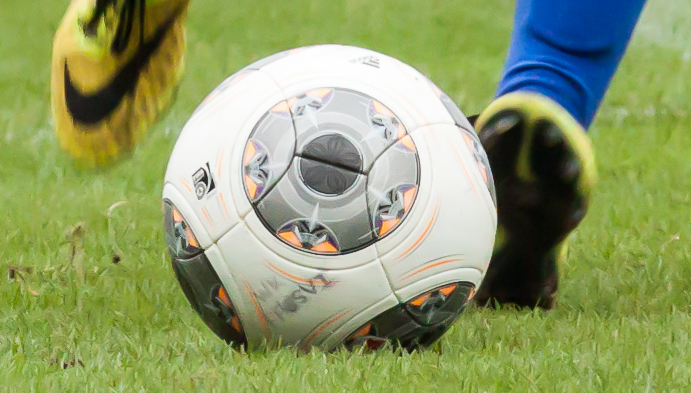
Torfabrik 2013–14

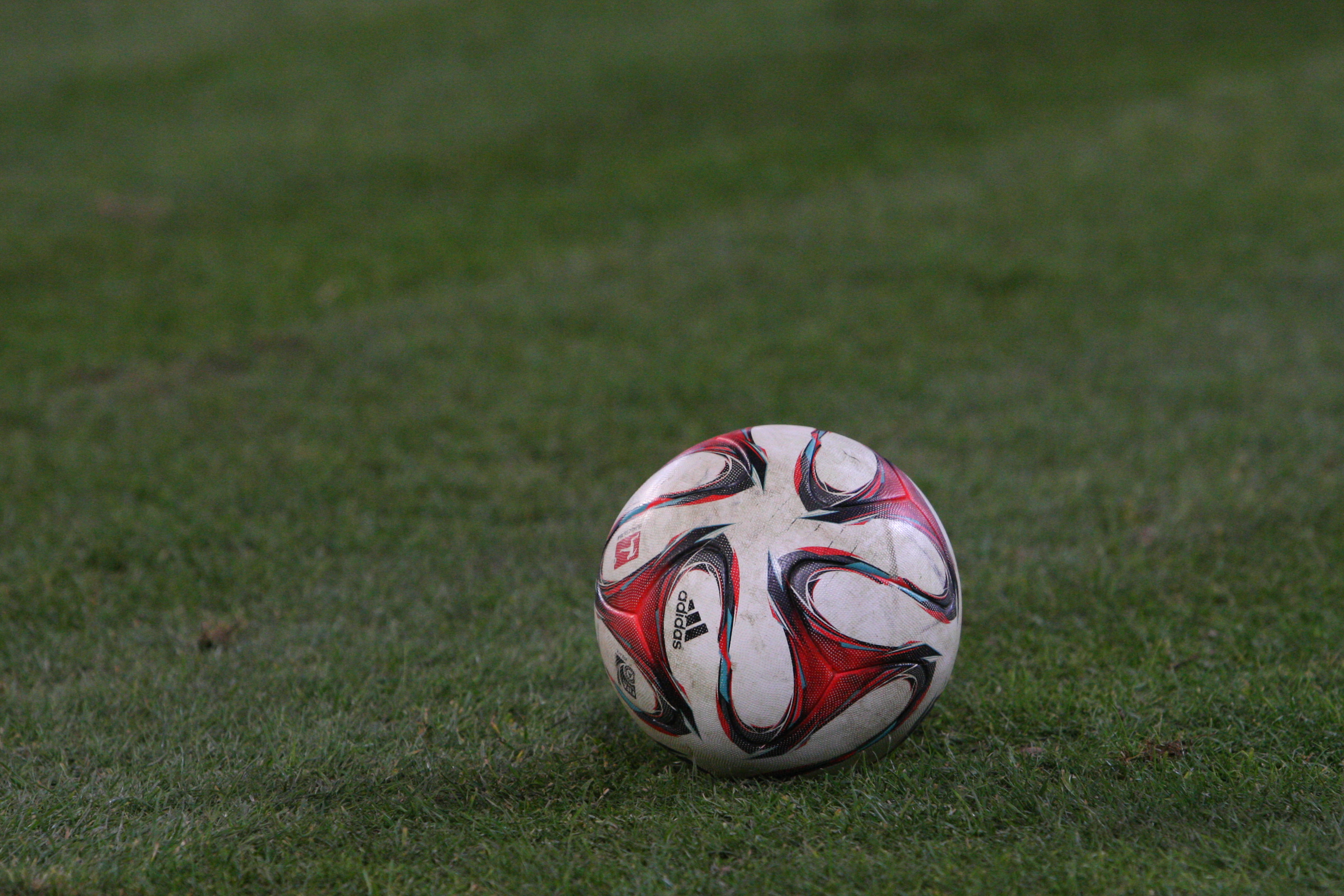
Torfabrik 2014–15

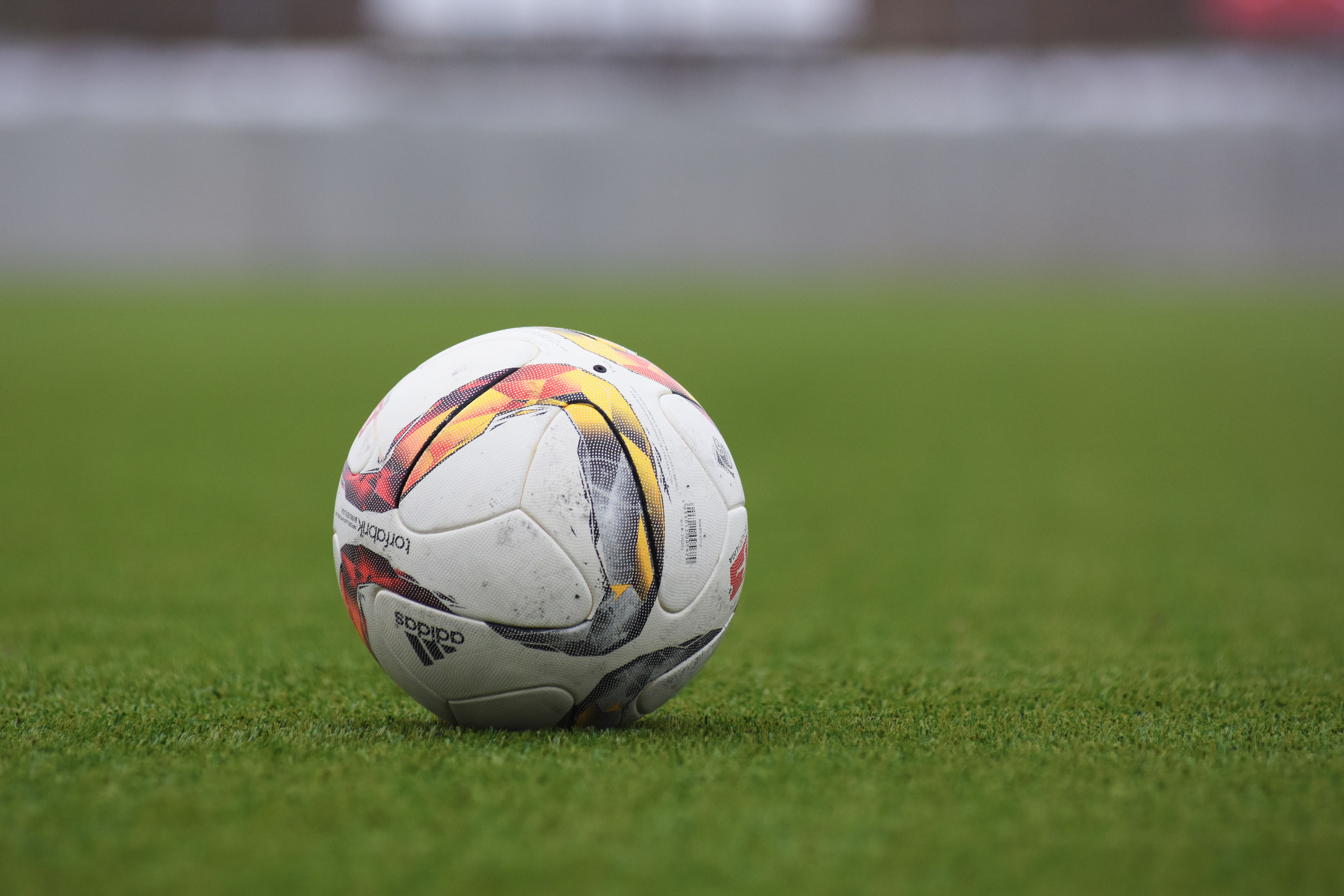
Torfabrik 2015–16
