= Forward Sports =

Pakistani sports manufacturing company

Forward Sports Private Limited
- Type: Private
- Industry: Sporting goods
- Founded: 1991; 35 years ago
- Founder: Khawaja Masood Akhtar
- Headquarters: Sialkot, Pakistan
- Key people: Khawaja Masood Akhtar (CEO)
- Products: Footballs, handballs, futsal balls, sports bags, shin guards, goalkeeper gloves
- Revenue: US$51 million (2021–22)
- Number of employees: 3000 (2016)
- Website: forward.pk

Forward Sports is a Pakistani sporting goods manufacturer based in Sialkot, Punjab, that produces footballs for Adidas and other international sports brands. The company was founded in 1991 by Khawaja Masood Akhtar and became part of Sialkot's export-oriented football manufacturing cluster. It has supplied Adidas balls for competitions including the FIFA World Cup, UEFA Champions League, Bundesliga and Ligue 1.

Forward Sports produced the Adidas Brazuca for the 2014 FIFA World Cup and the Adidas Telstar 18 for the 2018 FIFA World Cup. For the 2022 FIFA World Cup, the company manufactured Adidas Al Rihla training balls and replicas. In 2026, Forward Sports was reported to be the manufacturer of the Adidas Trionda, the official match ball of the 2026 FIFA World Cup.

== History ==
Forward Sports was founded in Sialkot in 1991 by Khawaja Masood Akhtar, a civil engineer who had previously worked in the football manufacturing industry. The company developed within Sialkot's sporting goods manufacturing cluster, a regional industrial base associated with footballs, gloves, surgical instruments and other export products. Although association football has historically been less popular in Pakistan than cricket, Sialkot became a centre for football production.

In an interview with Popular Mechanics, Akhtar said that Forward Sports produced about 1,000 hand-stitched balls per month in its first year, introduced lean manufacturing in 2004, and later added automatic lamination, printing and panel-cutting machines; by 2022, he said, the company's production had grown to one million balls per month.

The company began working with Adidas in the mid-1990s and later supplied balls for football competitions. Before its first FIFA World Cup contract, Forward Sports had manufactured balls for the UEFA Champions League, the German Bundesliga and Ligue 1. By 2014, the company was one of Adidas's official manufacturers in Pakistan and was asked to help produce the Adidas Brazuca after Adidas's Chinese supplier was unable to meet demand.

Forward Sports is part of Sialkot's export-oriented sporting goods sector, which supplies brands, clubs and tournament organisers internationally. It manufactures footballs and other sporting goods for export markets. In 2018, it was reported to produce around 700,000 footballs a month and to supply competitions including the UEFA Champions League, the Bundesliga and Ligue 1. In 2026, Akhtar said that the company produced 15 million footballs annually and had become Adidas's largest football supplier after replacing a Chinese competitor.

Pakistan was reported to be one of the world's largest football manufacturing countries, along with China and India, while Sialkot produced more than 43 million balls valued at US$191 million in the 2021–22 financial year. About eight percent of Sialkot's population of around one million people worked in the football manufacturing industry at the time of the report. In 2021–22, Forward Sports had revenue of about US$51 million.

== Production and technology ==
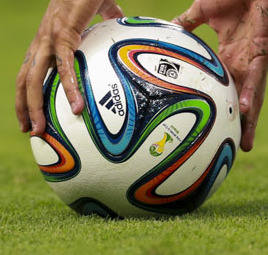
Adidas Brazuca for the 2014 FIFA World Cup

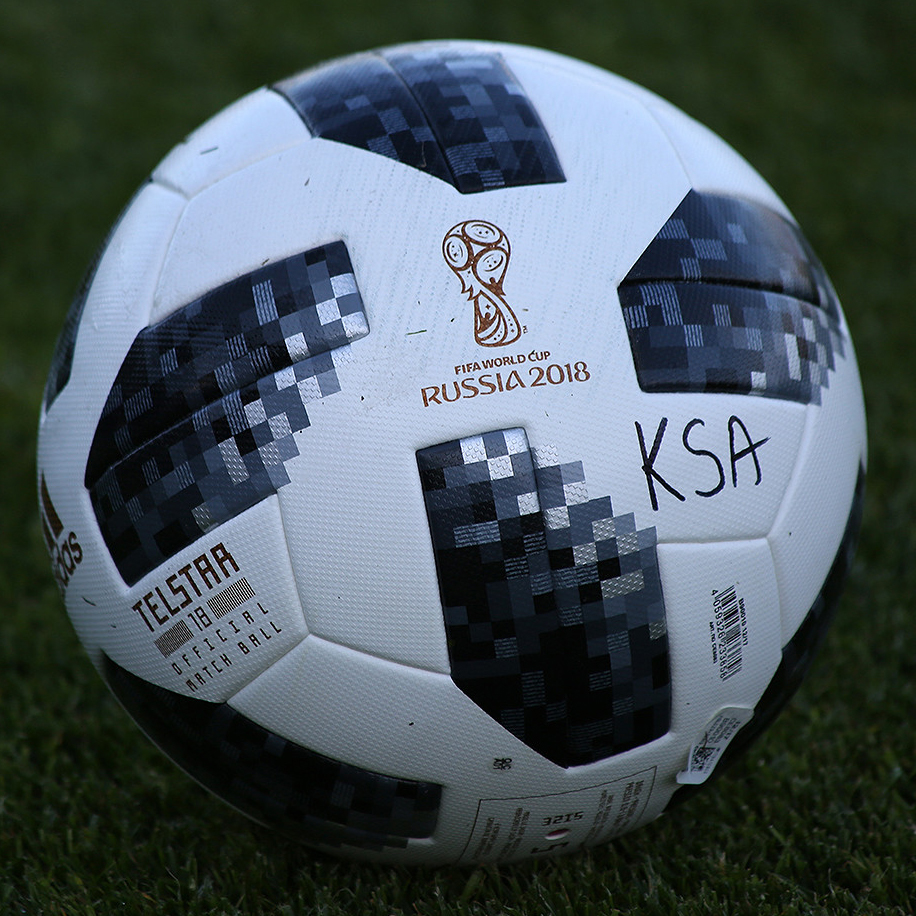
Adidas Telstar 18 for the 2018 FIFA World Cup

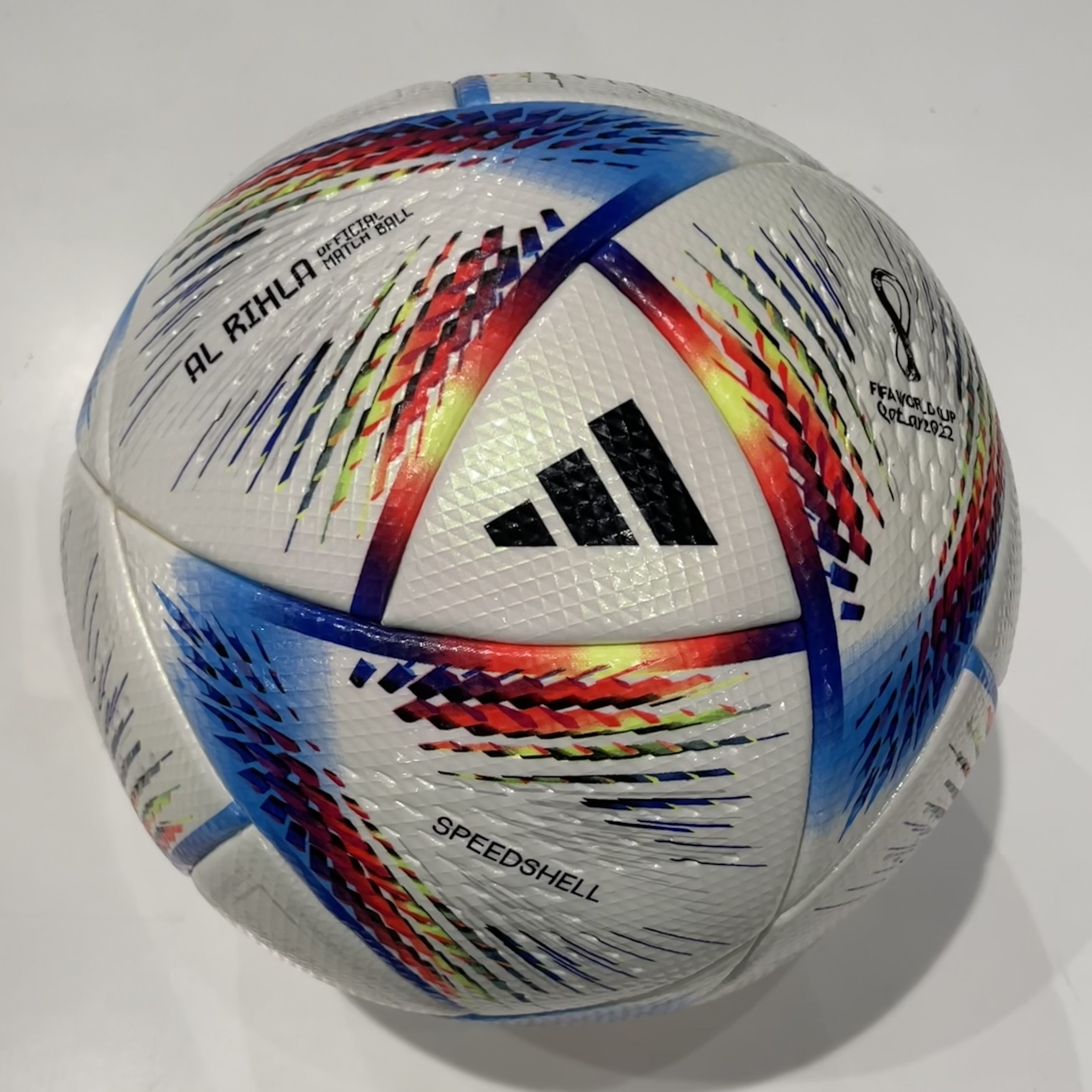
Adidas Al Rihla for the 2022 FIFA World Cup

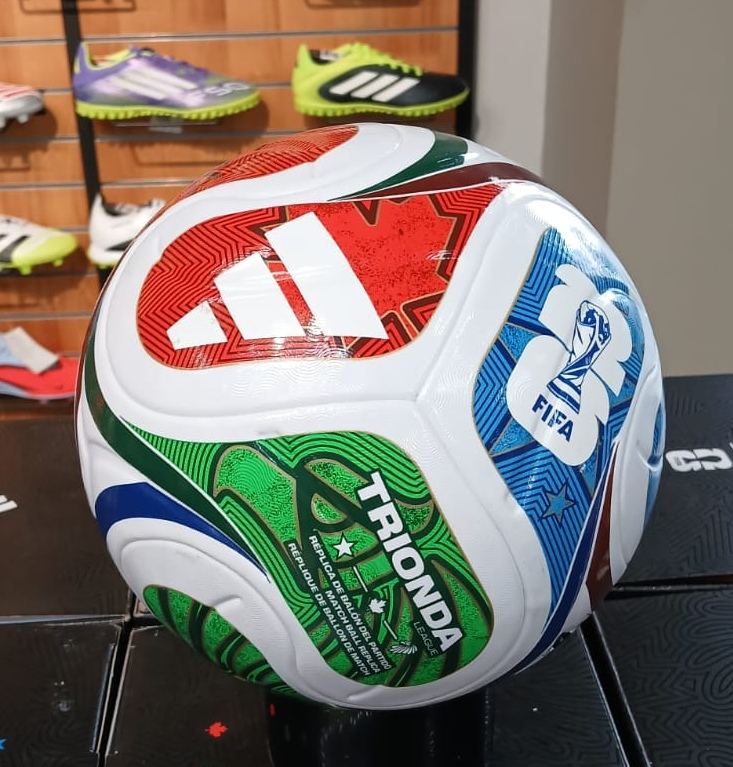
Adidas Trionda for the 2026 FIFA World Cup

Selected FIFA World Cup balls associated with Forward Sports

Forward Sports' growth has been linked to changes in football manufacturing in Sialkot. Traditional football production in the city relied heavily on hand-stitching, but tournament-ball manufacturing increasingly shifted toward thermo-bonded designs, in which panels are joined by heat rather than by stitching. Adidas transferred thermo-bonded ball technology to Forward Sports in 2013, and the company used the technology in footballs supplied for the 2014 FIFA World Cup.

For the 2014 FIFA World Cup, Forward Sports produced the Adidas Brazuca. The ball was the first FIFA World Cup match ball produced by the company and followed changes to its production system to meet Adidas's requirements. Akhtar said Forward Sports had less than two months to move from having no Brazuca production line to producing the World Cup ball. The company redesigned its production line and had local engineers build production and testing equipment in seven weeks. The Brazuca was co-produced in Sialkot, where about 1,400 staff worked on the project.

During a 2016 visit to the factory, The World reported that Forward Sports used computerised design equipment and laboratory testing before footballs entered mass production. According to Akhtar, the balls went through 80 tests, including exposure to heat, humidity and ultraviolet light, checks on printed designs, and an impact test in which balls were fired at a metal-studded plate at more than 60 kilometres per hour. The report also stated that the factory made bags for Adidas and used machines to test their resistance to rough handling.

The company also manufactured the Adidas Telstar 18 for the 2018 FIFA World Cup. The Telstar 18 used thermo-bonding and incorporated a near-field communication chip for consumer interactivity.

For the 2022 FIFA World Cup, Forward Sports manufactured Al Rihla balls for the tournament supply chain. Forward Sports director Hassan Masood Khawaja said that the company made 5.5 million Al Rihla balls, including 60,000 replicas that did not include the real-time sensor technology used in match balls. The same report stated that those balls were used on training fields and sold to consumers, while the match balls used in Qatar were made in China, with Adidas declining to identify the Chinese manufacturer. Forward Egypt, an affiliate of the Pakistani Forward sports equipment group, was also commissioned by Adidas to manufacture part of the Al Rihla supply.

In 2026, Forward Sports was reported to be the manufacturer of the Adidas Trionda, the official match ball of the 2026 FIFA World Cup. The ball was reported to feature a four-panel construction, host-country colours and connected-ball technology with a 500Hz motion sensor intended to support semi-automated offside decisions and video assistant referee systems.

== Affiliates and expansion ==
Forward Egypt, based in Badr City near Cairo, has been described as an affiliate of the Pakistani Forward sports equipment group and was commissioned by Adidas to manufacture part of the Al Rihla supply for the 2022 FIFA World Cup. GS Group describes Forward Egypt as a partnership between GS Group and Forward Group that began in June 2022.

In January 2026, Arab News reported that Forward Sports planned to launch operations in Saudi Arabia as the kingdom increased investment in sports ahead of the 2034 FIFA World Cup. A separate Arab News report stated that Saudi and Pakistani representatives had discussed the proposed opening of a Forward Sports headquarters in Saudi Arabia.

== Labour practices and criticism ==
Forward Sports operates in an industry that has historically faced international scrutiny over child labour and labour conditions in Sialkot. During the 1990s, football stitching in Sialkot came under pressure from labour rights campaigns, leading to international monitoring arrangements and reforms in the wider industry. Signs at the entrance to Forward Sports and inside the factory stated that underage workers were not accepted, and Akhtar described a policy requiring workers to have identity cards before employment.

The industry's shift toward thermo-bonded and machine-assisted balls also affected labour patterns in Sialkot. The adoption of thermo-bonded ball technology reduced demand for hand-stitching and contributed to job losses among traditional stitchers, especially women who had previously worked from home. Organisations including UN Women, the International Labour Organization and local partners worked on retraining women affected by the decline in hand-stitching work.

In 2014, Akhtar said that workers at Forward Sports were paid the minimum wage. The News International reported that workers at the company confirmed the minimum-wage claim, while labour activists argued that skilled football workers should receive higher pay and raised wider concerns about social security, unionisation and piece-rate wages in Sialkot's football industry.

In 2016, The World reported that Forward Sports employed about 3,000 people, including around 600 women working on the assembly line.

== Recognition ==
The company CEO Khawaja Masood Akhtar has received Pakistani civil awards for his work in sports exports. He was awarded the Sitara-i-Imtiaz in 2019. In 2023, he was among the recipients of the Hilal-i-Imtiaz for sports exports.
