= Semi-automated offside technology =

Association football officiating technology

Semi-automated offside technology (SAOT) is an officiating support system in association football used to assist video assistant referee (VAR) teams in reviewing possible offside offences. The technology uses player-tracking cameras, computer-generated offside lines and, in some implementations, data from a sensor inside the match ball to identify the position of players at the moment the ball is played. It is described as semi-automated because the system provides tracking data and automated alerts, while the final decision remains subject to review and confirmation by match officials.

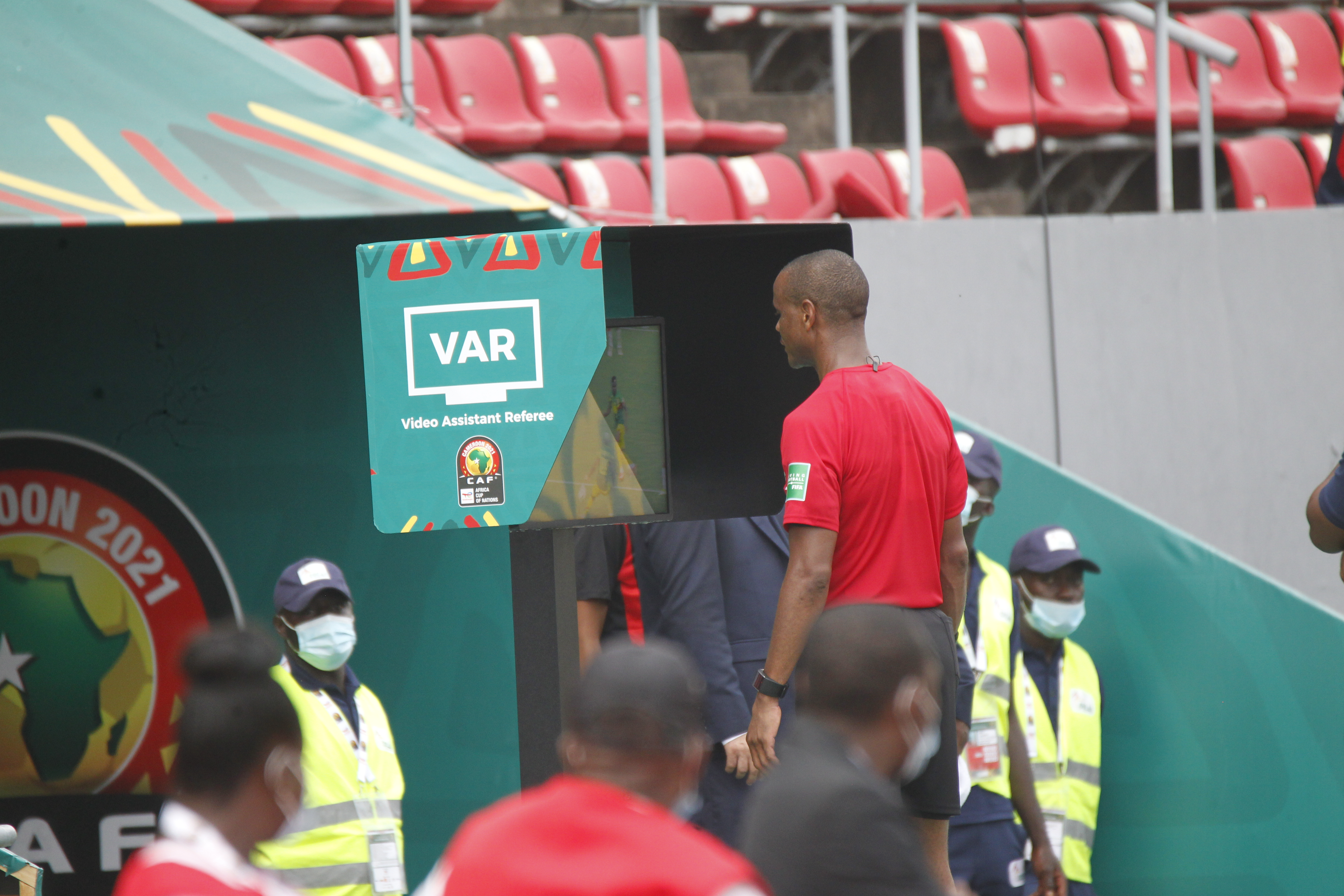
A referee reviewing an incident on a VAR monitor. Semi-automated offside technology assists video officials during offside reviews.

The system was tested by FIFA before being used at the 2022 FIFA World Cup, which was the first men's FIFA World Cup to use the technology. It has since been used or introduced in several major competitions, including UEFA competitions, the AFC Asian Cup, the FA Cup and the Premier League.

== Background ==
Offside decisions are made under Law 11 of the Laws of the Game. In matches using VAR, possible offside offences can be reviewed after attacking play has continued, particularly when a goal or other major match incident follows. Before the introduction of semi-automated systems, VAR teams typically used broadcast-style camera angles and manually selected frames and reference points to draw virtual offside lines.

SAOT was developed to reduce the time required for offside checks and to improve the consistency of the virtual offside line. It does not change the offside law itself. Instead, it automates parts of the review process by tracking player positions and helping identify the moment when the ball is played by an attacking teammate. The technology also produces visualisations that can be shown in stadiums or on broadcasts after a decision has been confirmed.

The system is part of a wider development in football officiating technology that includes goal-line technology, VAR and electronic performance and tracking systems. Different competitions have used different suppliers and technical configurations, but SAOT systems generally combine optical tracking, software-based offside-line generation and human review by match officials.

== Technology ==
Diagram showing an attacking player in an offside position

=== Player tracking ===
FIFA's 2022 implementation used twelve dedicated tracking cameras mounted under the stadium roof. The cameras tracked the ball and up to 29 data points on each player, 50 times per second, including limbs and other body parts relevant to offside decisions. The tracking data allowed the system to calculate player positions at the moment the ball was played and to identify potential offside offences for review by VAR officials.

The number and type of cameras can differ by competition and supplier. UEFA stated that its semi-automated offside system at UEFA Euro 2024 used ten specialised cameras to track 29 body points per player and integrated with the tournament's connected ball to identify the point of ball contact in offside situations. The Premier League described its system as a support tool that automates key elements of offside decision-making for VAR, including the placement of virtual offside lines.

=== Connected ball technology ===
Some SAOT implementations use connected ball technology to identify the precise moment when the ball is touched or played. The Adidas Al Rihla, used at the 2022 FIFA World Cup, included a motion sensor suspended inside the ball. Adidas stated that the sensor tracked every touch of the game at a rate of 500 times per second and supplied real-time ball data to the VAR team. FIFA has described connected ball technology as an aid for determining the kick point in semi-automated offside reviews.

Connected ball technology is not a replacement for player tracking. It supplies ball-contact data that can be combined with camera-based tracking of player positions. This helps the VAR team determine whether an attacking player was in an offside position at the moment the ball was played. The Adidas Trionda, used for the 2026 FIFA World Cup, was also reported to use an internal motion sensor for connected-ball data. Coverage of the 2026 World Cup technology described a system pairing optical tracking with ball-sensor data to support offside and other reviews.

=== VAR workflow and visualisation ===
When the system identifies a possible offside offence, it sends an alert to the VAR team. The officials then review the proposed offside line and relevant match footage before confirming the decision to the referee. This review stage is the reason the technology is described as semi-automated rather than fully automated. After a decision is confirmed, the system can generate a three-dimensional animation showing the players' positions at the relevant moment. FIFA used these animations at the 2022 World Cup to communicate offside decisions to spectators and television viewers. The Premier League similarly described the creation of virtual graphics for improved in-stadium and broadcast communication.

== Implementation ==
=== FIFA competitions ===
SAOT was tested by FIFA before its use at the 2022 FIFA World Cup. ABC News reported that the technology had made its debut at the 2021 FIFA Arab Cup before wider use at Qatar 2022. FIFA's World Cup implementation combined tracking cameras, player-limb data and ball-sensor information to support VAR offside reviews. The 2022 FIFA World Cup was the first men's FIFA World Cup to use semi-automated offside technology. The system was intended to make offside checks faster and more accurate, while retaining a role for video match officials and the on-field referee. FIFA tested an enhanced offside detection system at the 2025 FIFA Club World Cup. Reuters reported that the system integrated artificial intelligence, multiple cameras and sensors in the ball to accelerate offside decision-making, while complex situations still required VAR verification before decisions were confirmed. For the 2026 FIFA World Cup, coverage described further integration of camera tracking, ball-sensor data and three-dimensional visualisation tools.

=== UEFA competitions ===
UEFA introduced SAOT in European club competitions at the 2022 UEFA Super Cup and stated that it would also be used from the group stage of the 2022–23 UEFA Champions League. UEFA later used the technology in other competitions, including men's and women's European competitions and national-team tournaments. At UEFA Euro 2024, the system used specialised cameras and the tournament's connected ball to support offside decisions. UEFA stated that the system was intended to help VAR teams determine offside situations quickly and more accurately.

=== AFC competitions ===
The Asian Football Confederation introduced SAOT at the 2023 AFC Asian Cup in Qatar. The system was implemented at all 51 matches of the tournament. The AFC stated that this made it the first confederation to apply the technology at the continental men's national-team level. The technology was later introduced at AFC club level. In 2025, the AFC announced the implementation of SAOT at the AFC Champions League Elite Finals in Jeddah, following its use at the AFC Asian Cup.

=== English football ===
Premier League clubs voted in 2024 to introduce semi-automated offside technology. Reuters reported that the system was intended to improve the speed and consistency of offside decisions by using optical player tracking to place virtual offside lines more quickly. The introduction was delayed while testing continued. The technology was then trialled in the FA Cup, where reports stated that it would be used in selected fifth-round ties before a possible Premier League rollout. ESPN reported that the Premier League began using the technology from Matchweek 32 of the 2024–25 season.

== Reception and limitations ==
SAOT has been promoted by football governing bodies and competitions as a way to reduce the time taken for offside reviews and to make offside-line placement more consistent. The Associated Press reported that English football expected the system to reduce the average time needed to check offside decisions by 31 seconds during its FA Cup introduction.

The system has also faced delays and practical limitations. The Premier League's introduction was postponed after testing issues, and coverage of the FA Cup trial said that accuracy and crowded penalty-area situations could still create difficulties for the technology. Because match officials continue to review the system's proposed decision, the technology does not remove human judgement from the offside process. Some limitations relate to the exact identification of the kick point, player obstruction, crowded goalmouths and communication of decisions to spectators. Updated FIFA systems have attempted to address these issues through improved camera tracking, connected-ball data and visualisation tools.

== See also ==
- Offside (association football)
- Video assistant referee
- Goal-line technology
- Hawk-Eye
