= Vieww =

German company, based in Aachen

Vieww, previously known as GoalControl, is a German company based in Aachen, which provides technologies for use in sports.

Diagram

The company's main product is a goal-line technology for association football, called Vieww 4D (also previously known as GoalControl). The system features 14 high speed cameras which are mounted around the stadium, 7 directed to each of the goals. These cameras are used to detect if the ball has crossed the goal line or not. The camera is capable of taking 500 pictures per second and the ball's movement within 5 millimetres (0.20 in). The data from the camera is then sent to the central image processing center located within the stadium using a fiber optics cable, where a virtual representation of the ball is output to confirm the goal. The referee is equipped with a watch displaying the camera's data which will vibrate and display a signal whenever a goal is scored. This signal is then transmitted wirelessly.

The technology was licensed by FIFA in early 2013 alongside competing systems GoalRef, Hawk-Eye, and Cairos. Testing of the camera systems were completed in February, 2013. The GoalControl system was used at the 2013 Confederations Cup as a trial run, where it detected 68 goals and during the 2013 FIFA Club World Cup to track the ball, while GoalRef was used for display. The system was used 2014 World Cup in Brazil where it would be the first World Cup to feature goal-line technology. During the 2014 World Cup, one notable event of the GoalControl goal-line technology being used to award a goal was in the group E match between France and Honduras in which a kick from France's Karim Benzema bounced back from the goal post and an attempt to save the ball by Honduras' goalkeeper Noel Valladares led to an own goal.

A vote cast in early 2014 by the 36 German clubs of the first and second division decided with only 12 out of 36 votes for using the system due to the "exorbitant cost" of €250,000 (chip in the ball) to €500,000 (Hawk-Eye, GoalControl) per club. The support of 24 clubs would have been required to carry the motion.
