= Adidas Al Rihla =

2022 FIFA World Cup official ball

Al Rihla الْرِّحْلَة
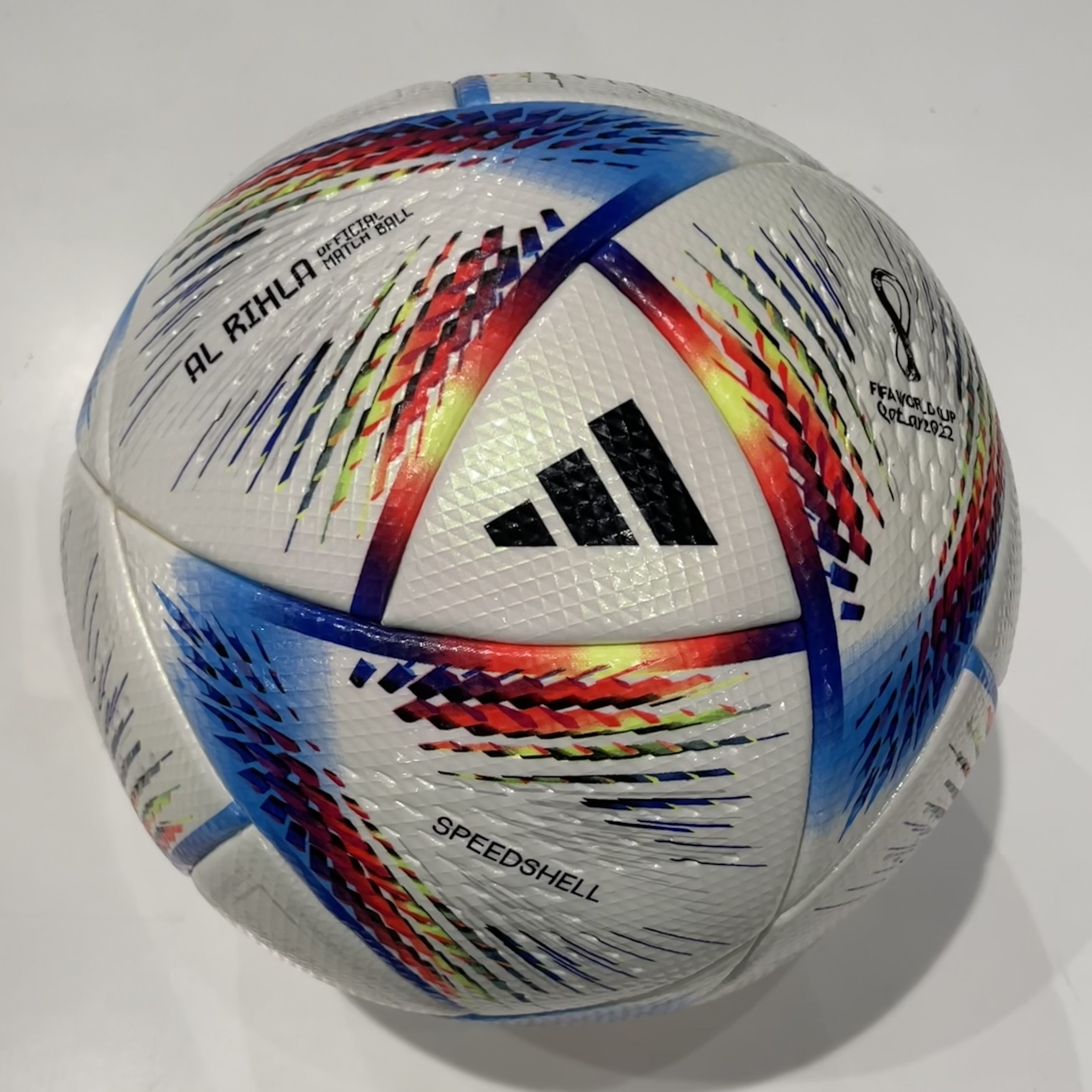
- Type: Football
- Inception: March 2022
- Manufacturer: Adidas
- Available: Yes
- Current supplier: Forward Sports

The Adidas Al Rihla (Arabic: الْرِّحْلَة, romanized: ar-riḥla, lit. 'The Journey') is a ball used for association football and produced by Adidas. It was the official match ball of the 2022 FIFA World Cup in Qatar, and has also been used as the official match ball for the Saudi Professional League and for the Qatar Stars League for the 2022–23 season. The ball contains a suspended inertial measurement unit inside its bladder that supplies the video assistant referee with instantaneous, highly detailed ball movement data. The ball was designed for sustainability, being the first FIFA World Cup official match ball to be produced with environmentally friendly inks and adhesives.

== History ==
Adidas unveiled Al Rihla on March 30, 2022. The presentation in Qatar featured former World Cup winners Kaká (Brazil) and Iker Casillas (Spain), as well as Farah Jefry (Saudi Arabia) and Nouf Al Anzi (United Arab Emirates). Al Rihla means The Journey or The Trip in Arabic. Rihla is also a traditional genre of Arabic literature about journeys, such as the 14th century travelogue of Ibn Battuta, known simply as The Rihla.

About 70% of the world's supply of footballs is produced in Sialkot. Pakistani football manufacturing company Forward Sports provided FIFA with 35% of over 300,000 Al Rihla match balls. It manufactured 5.5 million balls in 2022, including 60,000 high quality replicas used by teams for training in Qatar. Adidas subcontracted Forward Egypt, a subsidiary of Forward Sports, to produce 1,500 balls. For souvenir sale, replicas of Al Rihla were also provided by Adidas, but its production subcontracted to another company in Madiun, Indonesia- Global Way.

FIFA and Qatar Airways partnered with SpaceX on a unique promotional element during the Eutelsat Hotbird 13F mission launched on 15 October 2022.

On this flight, the Falcon 9 first stage booster B1069.3 carried a hosted promotional payload created for the 2022 FIFA World Cup in Qatar.

The payload was a small box equipped with Starlink hardware, and inside it were two Adidas Al Rihla footballs (the official match balls of the tournament). The box remained attached to the first stage throughout the mission, and after landing, it was recovered along with the balls, which were then used for World Cup–related activities.

== Description ==
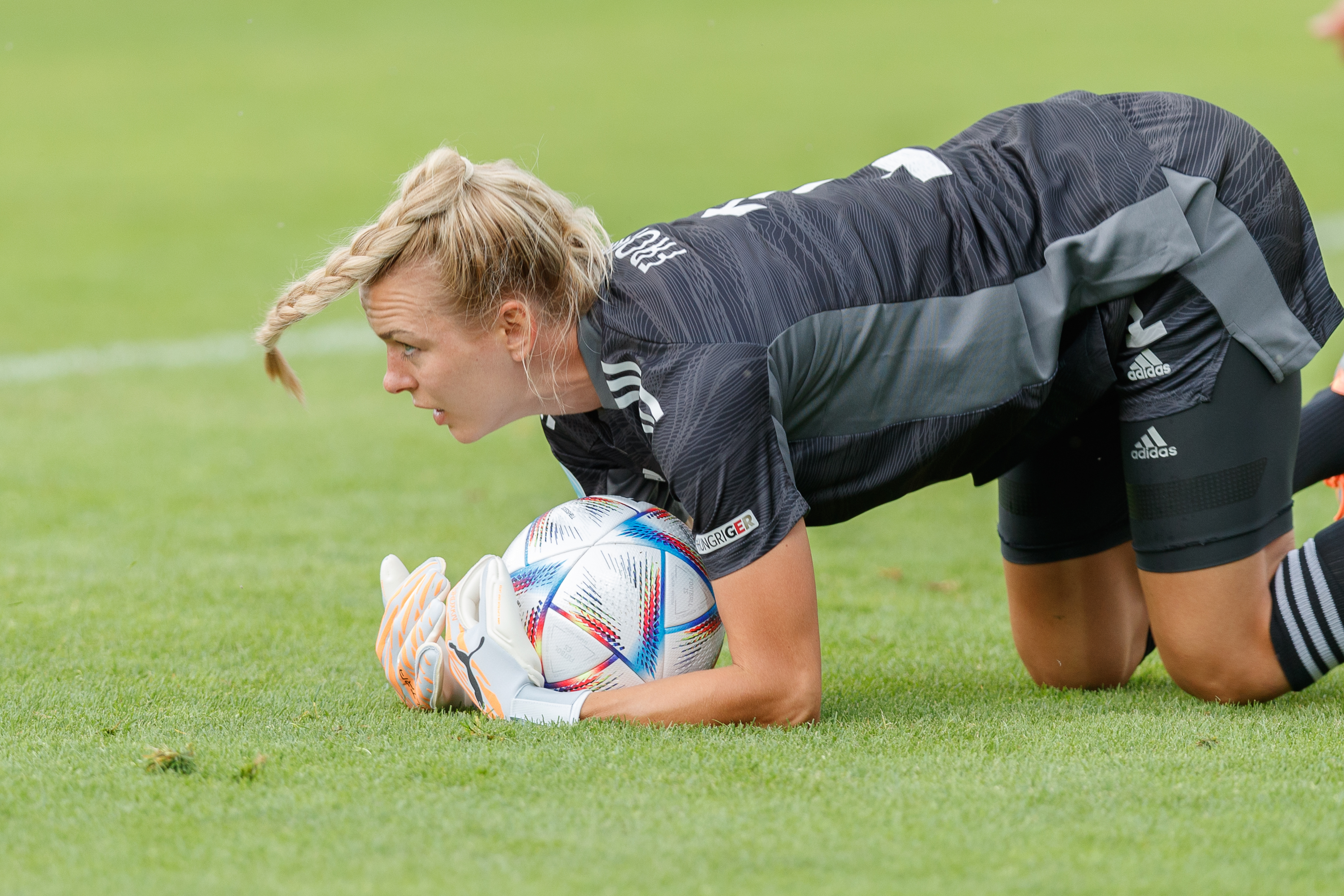
Al Rihla photographed in June 2022 with Merle Frohms

Al Rihla's membrane is made of twenty seamless, thermally bonded polyurethane panels. Its "Speedshell" surface is textured with debossed macro and micro patterns, designed to improve the ball's flight stability and swerve. Franziska Loffelmann, a design director at Adidas, describes Al Rihla as "the fastest and most accurate FIFA World Cup ball to date." Independent testing of the ball revealed that it has performance characteristics similar to the predecessor Telstar 18 and Brazuca balls.

The ball also features "connected ball technology," which includes a suspension system inside the ball's bladder with an inertial measurement unit (IMU) at the center that provides the video assistant referee (VAR) with highly accurate ball-movement data within seconds. This technology was developed by FIFA and Kinexon, based in Munich.

According to FIFA, the look of the ball is inspired by the culture, architecture, Dhow boats and flag of Qatar. The blue, red, and yellow color scheme is meant to represent the Qatari landscape.

On the "Pro" version of the ball, one can read "Football is..." and, all around it, the words "teamwork - fair play - collective - responsibility - passion - respect" in six languages: English, Arabic, Mandarin Chinese, French, Spanish, and Esperanto.

=== Final matches – Al Hilm ===
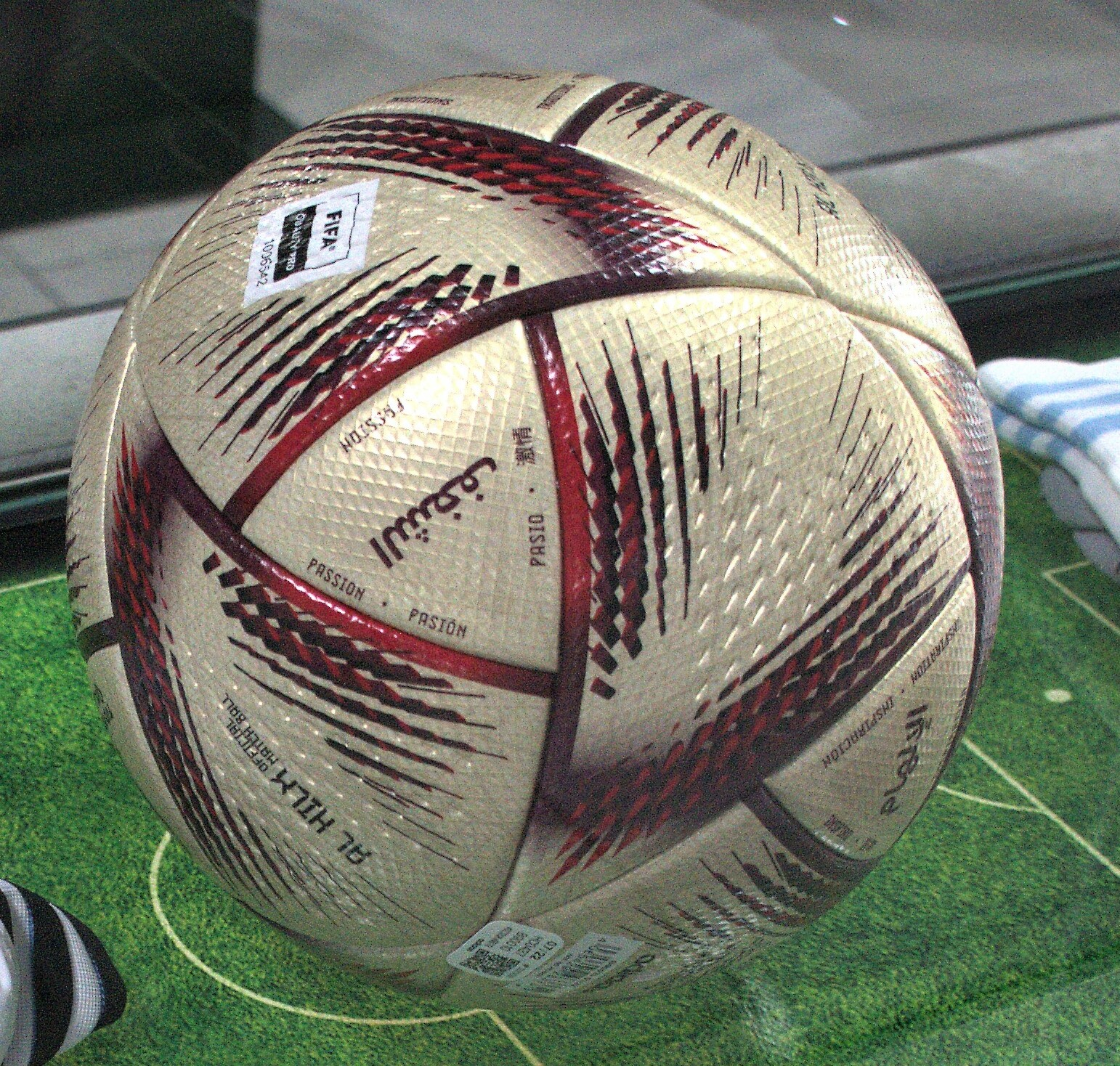
The Al Hilm, the match ball that replaced the Al Rihla for the semi-finals and the final

The match ball for the 2022 FIFA World Cup Final was announced on 11 December 2022. It is a variation of the Al Rihla, named the Adidas Al Hilm (Arabic: الحلم, romanized: al-ḥulm, lit. 'the dream', a reference to "every nation's dream of lifting the FIFA World Cup").

The Al Hilm was used for the Semi-finals, 3rd-position playoff, and the final of the World Cup 2022. It is the fifth special ball for FIFA World Cup semi-final and final matches designed by Adidas, the previous four being the +Teamgeist Berlin (2006), the Jo'bulani (2010), the Brazuca Final Rio (2014), and the Telstar Mechta (2018).

Al Hilm includes the same text and languages as the Al Rihla ball, but in a different configuration.

== See also ==
- List of FIFA World Cup official match balls

Preceded by Telstar 18	FIFA World Cup official ball 2022	Succeeded by Trionda
