= GoalRef =

GoalRef is an association football goal-line technology system developed by German research institute Fraunhofer in association with Select Sport. It works by detecting the passage of the ball using magnetic induction. Along with Hawk-Eye, GoalControl and Cairos it is one of four systems approved for use in the professional game by the International Football Association Board (IFAB).

== History ==
GoalRef was originally developed by a Danish organisation commissioned by Select Sport who entered the system for consideration by the International Handball Federation. In 2011 Fraunhofer became lead partner in GoalRef alongside the original inventor, and entered the system in the first stage testing being conducted for IFAB by EMPA (Swiss Federal Laboratories for Materials Science and Technology). GoalRef and Hawk-Eye were the only systems that proceeded to EMPA's second stage of testing, involving lab and field tests, plus trials in training and live professional matches. In this phase GoalRef was tested in the Danish Superliga. Following the second phase trials, on 5 July 2012 IFAB approved both GoalRef and Hawk-Eye in principle, making it available for use in professional matches under a set of revised Laws of the Game. Each installation however would also require licensing approval for use in the individual stadium, on a 12-month basis. The 2012 FIFA Club World Cup was the first tournament where GoalRef and Hawk-Eye were used by a match referee. GoalRef was used for the first time on 6 December 2012 in the first match of the 2012 FIFA Club World Cup.

== Technology ==
The GoalRef system relies on the principle of electromagnetic induction. A low frequency magnetic field is generated around the goal, which is monitored by coils installed in the goal posts and crossbar. The ball is fitted with a passive electronic circuit embedded between the leather outer and inflatable inner layers. Software monitors the condition of the magnetic field in the goal and can detect the change that occurs in it due to the passage of the coils in the ball over the line. Once detected, the system sends an encrypted radio signal in real time to a wrist watch worn by the referee, which both vibrates and displays a message that a goal was scored.
