= Goal-line technology =

Electronic aid to determine if a goal has been scored in association football

Diagram of the use of multiple cameras in the GoalControl goal-line technology system.

Sometimes it is difficult for the naked eye to see if the ball has crossed the line.

In association football, goal-line technology (sometimes referred to as a Goal Decision System) is the use of electronic aid to determine if a goal has been scored or not. In detail, it is a method used to determine when the ball has completely crossed the goal line in between the goal-posts and underneath the crossbar with the assistance of electronic devices and at the same time assisting the referee in awarding a goal or not. The objective of goal-line technology (GLT) is not to replace the role of the officials, but rather to support them in their decision-making. The GLT must provide a clear indication as to whether the ball has fully crossed the line, and this information will serve to assist the referee in making their final decision.

Compared to similar technology in other sports, goal-line technology is a relatively recent addition to association football, its integration having been opposed by the sport's authorities. In July 2012, the International Football Association Board (IFAB) officially approved the use of goal-line technology, amending the Laws of the Game to permit (but not require) its use. Due to its expense, goal-line technology is only used at the highest levels of the game. Goal-line technology is currently used in the top European domestic leagues and at major international competitions such as, since 2014, the men's and women's FIFA World Cups.

== Background ==
If the line in this diagram is the goal line between the goal posts, the only case in which a goal has been scored is position D.

In association football, a goal is scored if the whole of the ball crosses the goal line between the goalposts and under the crossbar. In most cases, this is relatively unambiguous (goal nets being a low-tech way of verifying that the ball passed the correct side of the goalposts). Occasionally, however, situations occur when it is difficult for referees and their assistants to tell if a goal has been scored before a rebound, save, or defender's clearance from the goal area.

== Rules ==
Since 2012, goal-line technology has been permitted in matches. Text relating to goal-line technology can now be found within four of the Laws of the Game:

- Law 1 (The Field of Play): permitting modifications to the goal frame.
- Law 2 (The Ball): permitting the use of approved balls with integrated technology.
- Law 5 (The Referee): requiring the referee to test a goal-line technology system prior to a match and not use it if a fault is found.
- Law 10 (Determining the outcome of a match): permitting use of goal-line technology to verify whether or not goals have been scored. It states that "the use of GLT must be stipulated in the respective competition rules".

The Laws themselves are not specific as to the nature of goal line technology systems, however other documentation from FIFA, which is cited by the Laws, goes into more detail. The FIFA Quality Programme for GLT Testing Manual precisely define the requirements of the systems. Four basic requirements of a system are stipulated:

- The system must address only the matter of whether a goal has been scored or not.
- The system must be accurate.
- The system must indicate the scoring of a goal immediately, confirming this within one second.
- The system must communicate its information solely to the match officials (via vibration and visual alert on the referee's watch)

FIFA have a system whereby a particular technology provider needs to show effectiveness to successfully obtain a license for their technology, then an installation within a particular stadium must pass a "final installation test" before use, and before each game the referee must check that the system is functional.

== Competitions using goal-line technology ==
Due to the expense of goal-line technology systems, the technology is only currently used at the very top levels of the game. In domestic competition, goal-line technology is only regularly used in a few major European leagues:

=== Club competitions ===
==== International ====
- FIFA
  - FIFA Club World Cup

==== Continental ====
- AFC
  - AFC Challenge League
  - AFC Champions League Elite
  - AFC Champions League Two
- UEFA
  - UEFA Champions League (Note: Play-offs onwards) (Note: Host clubs may use pre-installed and certified GLT systems during the qualifying phase, subject to UEFA’s approval and the visiting club’s consent)
  - UEFA Conference League (Note: Final only) (Note: Host clubs may use pre-installed and certified GLT systems during the qualifying phase and play-offs, the league phase and the knockout phase, subject to UEFA’s approval and the visiting club’s consent)
  - UEFA Europa League (Note: League stage onwards) (Note: Host clubs may use pre-installed and certified GLT systems in the qualifying phase and play-offs, subject to UEFA’s approval and the visiting club’s consent)
  - UEFA Super Cup
  - UEFA Women's Champions League (Note: optional)

==== Domestic leagues ====
- (England) Premier League
- (England) English Football League
  - Championship
  - League One (Note: Play-off final only)
  - League Two
- (France) Ligue 1
- (Germany) Bundesliga
- (Germany) 2. Bundesliga
- (Italy) Serie A
- (Netherlands) Eredivisie (Note: Selected matches)
- (Saudi Arabia) Saudi Pro League

==== Domestic cups ====
- (England) FA Cup (Note: Third round to quarter-finals (Premier League and EFL Championship stadiums only), semi-finals and final only)
- (England) EFL Cup (Note: Second round to semi-finals (Premier League and EFL Championship stadiums only) and final only)
- (England) FA Community Shield
- (Italy) Coppa Italia (Note: Round of 16 onwards)
- (Scotland) Scottish Cup (Note: Semi-finals and final only)

=== National team competitions ===
==== International ====
- FIFA
  - FIFA Arab Cup
  - FIFA U-20 World Cup
  - FIFA Women's World Cup
  - FIFA World Cup

==== Continental ====
- AFC
  - AFC Asian Cup
  - AFC U-23 Asian Cup
- CONCACAF
  - CONCACAF Under-17 Championship
  - CONCACAF Under-20 Championship
- UEFA
  - UEFA European Championship (Note: Finals only)
  - UEFA European Under-21 Championship
  - UEFA Nations League

As of September 2024, FIFA's website list 144 stadiums with licensed GLT installations, 135 of which use the Hawk-Eye system. The other 9 use Vieww, which is the other licensed provider.

== History ==
=== Pre-implementation history ===
Prior to 2012, competitions were unable to implement technology as provision was not made for it in the Laws. The Laws of association football are controlled by the International Football Association Board (IFAB), a body on which FIFA holds 50% of the voting power, sufficient to veto any changes to the laws.

==== Pre-2011 ====
Compared to other sports, association football was late to allow technology to assist with in-game decisions. The matter was a subject of debate within the game for over a decade with the game's lawmakers resisting calls for its implementation.

Throughout the 2000s various incidents incited discussion as to the potential for goal-line technology or a 'phantom goal' in the game. The lack of use of technology in association football was contrasted with other sports, which had incorporated video replays and other systems into their rules.

In response to this, FIFA decided to test a system by Adidas in which a football with an embedded microchip would send a signal to the referee if it crossed a sensor going through the goal. According to then-FIFA president Sepp Blatter, who was later forced out of football for his part in a serious corruption scandal, "We did different tests at the Under-17 World Cup in Peru but the evidence wasn't clear so we will carry out trials in junior competitions in 2007". However, those trials did not materialise and by 2008, Blatter had rejected the system outright, describing the technology as "only 95% accurate". FIFA and IFAB were resistant to introducing technology in the game, voting in March 2010 to permanently ditch the technology.

Following several refereeing errors at the 2010 FIFA World Cup – including the disallowed goal in Germany's 4–1 victory over England, when Frank Lampard hit a shot from outside of the penalty box that bounced off the crossbar and over the line; the ball came back out and the goal was disallowed because the assistant referee did not call for a goal – Blatter announced that FIFA would reopen the goal-line technology discussion.

Before Euro 2012, UEFA president Michel Platini dismissed the need for goal-line technology, instead arguing for placing additional assistant referees behind the goal. However, in a Group D match with Ukraine losing 1–0 to England, a shot by Ukraine's Marko Dević briefly crossed the line within clear view of the goal-line official before it was cleared by England's John Terry, reopening the debate, although an offside in the build-up to the incident was also unnoticed by the match officials.

==== Initial testing ====
Heeding calls for the use of technology, in July 2011 FIFA began a process of sanctioned tests that eventually resulted in the approval of the systems used in the current game.

The first stage of testing considered multiple goal-line technology systems, with the requirement that the system notified the referee of the decision within one second of the incident happening. The message needed to be relayed via a visual signal and vibration. Tests were conducted by Empa between September and December 2011. Tested systems included:

- A system from Cairos Technologies, in collaboration with Adidas, based around a modified ball with an implanted chip and a magnetic field generated by thin cables behind the goal line. The system could detect if the ball passed through the field.
- GoalRef: Another system based on generated magnetic fields and a sensor within the ball.
- Goalminder: A system based on cameras installed in the goal frame. This provided a visual playback to officials rather than an automatic goal-or-no-goal alert.
- Hawk-Eye: A Sony-owned system based on multiple high-speed cameras whose images are used to triangulate the position of the ball. Hawk-Eye systems were, and still are, used in several other sports for supporting officiating decisions.

==== Second phase of testing ====
On 3 March 2012, IFAB announced that two of the eight proposed systems had proceeded to the second stage of testing. These were Hawk-Eye and GoalRef. In the second phase of testing, the manufacturer of the technology chose a stadium to test its technology in a number of imagined scenarios. Testing was also conducted in professional training sessions and in laboratories to account for different climatic conditions and other magnetic field distortions. There were also tests on the watches to be worn by referees. The systems underwent testing in some competitive matches.

GoalRef technology underwent match testing in some Danish Superliga matches in the first half of 2012. Following the second phase trials, on 5 July 2012 IFAB approved GoalRef in principle, making it available for use in professional matches under a set of revised Laws of the Game. Each installation however would also require licensing approval for use in the individual stadium, on a 12-month basis. The 2012 FIFA Club World Cup was the first tournament where GoalRef was used by a match referee. Goal Ref was used for the first time on 6 December 2012 in the first match of the 2012 FIFA Club World Cup.

The first match to use the Hawk-Eye goal-line technology was Eastleigh F.C. versus A.F.C. Totton in the Hampshire Senior Cup final at St Mary's Stadium, Southampton in England on 16 May 2012. Although it used Hawk-Eye, the system had no bearing on the referee's decisions and the system readings were only available to FIFA's independent testing agency. The system was also in place for the technology's second test on 2 June for England's friendly match against Belgium.

=== Introduction ===
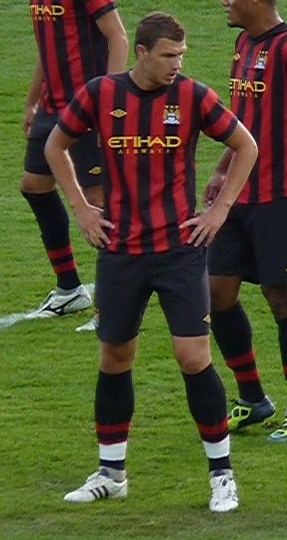
Edin Džeko of Manchester City scored the first goal in the Premier League that was given by goal-line technology

Following the success of the trials, in July 2012 IFAB voted unanimously to officially amend the Laws of the Game to permit (but not require) goal-line technology.

In December 2012, FIFA announced it would introduce goal-line technology at the 2012 FIFA Club World Cup in Japan. Hawk-Eye technology was employed at Toyota Stadium, while GoalRef was used at International Stadium Yokohama.

GoalControl, a camera-based system which uses 14 high-speed cameras located around the pitch and directed at both goals, was used at the 2013 Confederations Cup, partly as a trial for use at the next year's World Cup.

The Football Association introduced Hawk-Eye during the 2013–14 Premier League season and the later rounds of the 2013–14 Football League Cup. A League Cup quarter-final match on 17 December 2013 saw the first goal-line technology-assisted decision in English football and the first goal to be decisively awarded using the technology in the English Premier League was Edin Džeko's goal for Manchester City against Cardiff City on 18 January 2014.

Following success at the Confederations Cup, GoalControl was used at the 2014 FIFA World Cup. The first goal given by the technology was on 15 June 2014 group stage match between France and Honduras.

Goal Line Technology was implemented across the major European competitions. In December 2014, the Bundesliga clubs approved goal-line technology that will be introduced at the start of the 2015–16 Bundesliga season. The league picked the cheaper Hawk-Eye system over two German technologies. GoalControl was introduced for Ligue 1 for the start of the 2015–16 Ligue 1 season. Ligue 1 later switched to using Hawk-Eye in 2018 after the GoalControl system made errors.

Goal Line Technology was used in the UEFA Europa League final, UEFA Champions League, European Championship and Copa America for the first time in 2016.

== Criticism ==
=== Loss of human element ===
While advocates for goal-line technology maintain that it would significantly reduce refereeing errors during play, there are also criticisms of the technology. Much of the criticism came from within FIFA itself including disgraced former FIFA president Blatter. Apart from the criticisms revolving around the technical aspects of the two proposed technologies, critics allege that such technology would impact on the human element of the game and eliminate what they promote as the laudable activity of debating mistakes. Blatter has been quoted as saying, "Other sports regularly change the laws of the game to react to the new technology. ... We don't do it and this makes the fascination and the popularity of football."

A study suggested that in the 2010–11 Premier League season "errors took place nearly 30% of the time that video replays could help prevent", but some people claim that instant replays would interrupt the flow of the game and take away possible plays.

Other critics believe it would be prohibitively expensive to implement the technology at all levels of the game and particularly for smaller/poorer football associations. FIFA officials have expressed a preference for "better refereeing" as well as more match officials over implementing the technology. Advocates, in turn, cite the many examples of incorrect goal-line decisions deciding important games and point out that the technology has improved much since the initial trials carried out by FIFA. Advocates contend that any extra help for the referee should outweigh arguments that it would lead to non-uniform rules (since not all football associations would be able to implement it).

Blatter had been opposed to goal-line technology until Frank Lampard's disallowed goal in the 2010 World Cup where the ball clearly crossed the line.

The introduction of additional assistant referees, who are mostly positioned beside the goal line, was partly in order to facilitate in such situations.

=== Cost ===
In April 2014, MLS commissioner Don Garber confirmed that MLS would not adopt goal-line technology for the 2014 season, citing cost as the overriding factor. GoalControl installation would cost about $260,000 per stadium, and a further $3,900 for each game.

In early 2014, the vast majority of teams in the two divisions of the German Bundesliga voted against introducing goal-line technology for financial reasons. The costs per club would have ranged from €250,000 for a chip inside the ball up to €500,000 for Hawk-Eye or GoalControl. The manager of 1. FC Köln, Jörg Schmadtke, summarized the vote with "The cost is so exorbitant, that using this (technology) is not acceptable".

World governing body FIFA are set to make £300,000 from the Premier League's decision to install goal-line technology in all top-flight stadiums before the start of next season. Each of the 20 clubs will have to pay FIFA £15,000 to install, test and receive the 'FIFA quality seal' for Hawk-Eye's camera-based system, which is expected to cost around £250,000 per ground in total. FIFA will also make an extra £15,000 from Wembley Stadium, which will have the technology installed for use in events such as the FA Cup semi-finals and final.

The Scottish Professional Football League stated in December 2017 that it would not be implementing goal-line technology, as it is only affordable for the richest leagues in Europe.

=== Failures ===
Multiple errors in the 2017–18 Coupe de la Ligue quarter-finals led to the use of the GoalControl system being temporarily suspended by the Ligue de Football Professionnel. It failed to award Paris Saint-Germain their second goal against Amiens, which the video assistant referee (VAR) overturned. In the match between Angers and Montpellier, the system incorrectly flagged the referee, causing the match officials to not use it for the second half.

The system came under scrutiny in June 2020 after a Premier League match between Aston Villa and Sheffield United as the technology failed to award a goal for Sheffield United despite the fact that Aston Villa goalkeeper Ørjan Nyland had carried the ball over the goal line after mishandling a free kick from Sheffield United's Oliver Norwood by colliding with teammate Keinan Davis. As no goal was signalled, the match officials decided not to let VAR intervene, and the game finished goalless. Hawk-Eye apologised, explaining the failure as due to an anomalous amount of occlusion of its cameras' view of the incident.

The system came under further scrutiny in 2022 after an EFL Championship game between Huddersfield Town and Blackpool FC saw Yuta Nakayama head the ball over the goal line before being scrambled out by Daniel Grimshaw. As the goal was not signalled by Hawk-Eye, the referee did not award a goal and the match finished 0–1 to Blackpool. The EFL released a statement the next day, insisting that the referee's decision was "final" and "the match result stands".

== See also ==
- Football video support
- Semi-automated offside technology
- Video assistant referee
- Photo finish
- Ghost goal
