= 2012 FIFA Club World Cup =

FIFA Club World Cup Japan 2012 presented by Toyota Toyota プレゼンツ FIFAクラブワールドカップ ジャパン2012

Tournament details
- Host country: Japan
- Dates: 6–16 December
- Teams: 7 (from 6 confederations)
- Venues: 2 (in 2 host cities)

Final positions
- Champions: (Brazil) Corinthians (2nd title)
- Runners-up: (England) Chelsea
- Third place: (Mexico) Monterrey
- Fourth place: (Egypt) Al Ahly

Tournament statistics
- Matches played: 8
- Goals scored: 21 (2.63 per match)
- Attendance: 283,063 (35,383 per match)
- Top scorer(s): César Delgado (Monterrey); Hisato Satō (Sanfrecce Hiroshima); 3 goals each
- Best player: Cássio (Corinthians)
- Fair play award: (Mexico) Monterrey

The 2012 FIFA Club World Cup (officially known as the FIFA Club World Cup Japan 2012 presented by Toyota for sponsorship reasons) was a football tournament that was played from 6 to 16 December 2012. It was the ninth edition of the FIFA Club World Cup, a FIFA-organised tournament between the winners of the six continental confederations as well as the host nation's league champions. The tournament was hosted by Japan.

Defending champions Barcelona did not qualify as they were eliminated in the semi-finals of the 2011–12 UEFA Champions League by eventual champions Chelsea.

Corinthians won the title for the second time (also becoming the last South American and non-European team to win the tournament), winning 1–0 in the semi-finals against Al Ahly before beating Chelsea by the same margin in the final.

== Host bids ==
The FIFA Executive Committee appointed Japan as hosts for the 2011 and 2012 tournaments on 27 May 2008 during their meeting in Sydney, Australia.

== Qualified teams ==
Location of teams of the 2012 FIFA Club World Cup

Team	Confederation	Qualification	Participation (bold indicates winners)
Entering in the semi-finals
(Brazil) Corinthians	CONMEBOL	Winners of the 2012 Copa Libertadores	2nd (Previous: **2000**)
(England) Chelsea	UEFA	Winners of the 2011–12 UEFA Champions League	Debut
Entering in the quarter-finals
(South Korea) Ulsan Hyundai	AFC	Winners of the 2012 AFC Champions League	Debut
(Egypt) Al Ahly	CAF	Winners of the 2012 CAF Champions League	4th (Previous: 2005, 2006, 2008)
(Mexico) Monterrey	CONCACAF	Winners of the 2011–12 CONCACAF Champions League	2nd (Previous: 2011)
Entering in the play-off for quarter-finals
(New Zealand) Auckland City	OFC	Winners of the 2011–12 OFC Champions League	4th (Previous: 2006, 2009, 2011)
(Japan) Sanfrecce Hiroshima	AFC (host)	Winners of the 2012 J. League Division 1	Debut

== Match officials ==
The appointed referees are:

Confederation	Referee	Assistant referees
AFC	(Bahrain) Nawaf Shukralla	(Bahrain) Ebrahim Saleh (Bahrain) Yaser Tulefat
AFC	(Iran) Alireza Faghani (reserve)	(Iran) Hassan Kamranifar (reserve) (Iran) Reza Sokhandan (reserve)
CAF	(Algeria) Djamel Haimoudi	(Algeria) Abdelhak Etchiali (Morocco) Redouane Achik
CONCACAF	(Mexico) Marco Antonio Rodríguez	(Mexico) Marvin Torrentera (Mexico) Marcos Quintero
CONMEBOL	(Ecuador) Carlos Vera	(Ecuador) Christian Lescano (Ecuador) Byron Romero
OFC	(New Zealand) Peter O'Leary	(New Zealand) Mark Rule (Fiji) Ravinesh Kumar
UEFA	(Turkey) Cüneyt Çakır	(Turkey) Bahattin Duran (Turkey) Tarık Ongun

== Squads ==
Each team submitted a squad of 23 players, three of them goalkeepers. The squads were announced on 29 November 2012.

== Venues ==
The venues for the 2012 FIFA Club World Cup were Yokohama and Toyota.

Toyota	2012 FIFA Club World Cup is located in Japan	Yokohama
Toyota Stadium (Japan)	2012 FIFA Club World Cup is located in Japan	Nissan Stadium (Yokohama)
35°05′05″N 137°10′15″E	2012 FIFA Club World Cup is located in Japan	35°30′35″N 139°36′20″E
Capacity: 45,000	2012 FIFA Club World Cup is located in Japan	Capacity: 72,327

== Goal-line technology ==
The 2012 FIFA Club World Cup was the first FIFA tournament to use goal-line technology following its approval by the International Football Association Board (IFAB) in July 2012. The two systems approved by FIFA, GoalRef (installed in Yokohama) and Hawk-Eye (installed in Toyota), were used in the two stadiums.

== Matches ==
The draw for the 2012 FIFA Club World Cup was held at the FIFA headquarters in Zürich, Switzerland, on 24 September 2012 at 11:30 CEST (UTC+02:00). The draw decided the "positions" in the bracket for the three representatives which entered the quarter-finals (AFC/CAF/CONCACAF).

If a match was tied after normal playing time:

- For elimination matches, extra time was played. If still tied after extra time, a penalty shoot-out was held to determine the winner.
- For the matches for fifth place and third place, no extra time was played, and a penalty shoot-out was held to determine the winner.

Play-off for quarter-finals
6 December – Yokohama
(Japan) Sanfrecce Hiroshima	1
(New Zealand) Auckland City	0

Quarter-finals
9 December – Toyota
(Japan) Sanfrecce Hiroshima	1
(Egypt) Al Ahly	2
9 December – Toyota
(South Korea) Ulsan Hyundai	1
(Mexico) Monterrey	3

Semi-finals
12 December – Toyota
(Egypt) Al Ahly	0
(Brazil) Corinthians	1
13 December – Yokohama
(Mexico) Monterrey	1
(England) Chelsea	3
Match for fifth place
12 December – Toyota
(South Korea) Ulsan Hyundai	2
(Japan) Sanfrecce Hiroshima	3

Final
16 December – Yokohama
(Brazil) Corinthians	1
(England) Chelsea	0
Match for third place
16 December – Yokohama
(Egypt) Al Ahly	0
(Mexico) Monterrey	2

All times Japan Standard Time (UTC+09:00).

=== Play-off for quarter-finals ===
6 December 2012
19:45

Sanfrecce Hiroshima (Japan)	1–0	(New Zealand) Auckland City
Aoyama 66'	Report

International Stadium Yokohama, Yokohama
Attendance: 25,174
Referee: Djamel Haimoudi (Algeria)

A minute's silence was held before the match to commemorate Dutch linesman Richard Nieuwenhuizen, who had died following a violent incident at a youth competition four days before the match.

=== Quarter-finals ===
9 December 2012
16:00

Ulsan Hyundai (South Korea)	1–3	(Mexico) Monterrey
Lee Keun-ho 88'	Report	Corona 9'; Delgado 77', 84'

Toyota Stadium, Toyota
Attendance: 20,353
Referee: Cüneyt Çakır (Turkey)

9 December 2012
19:30

Sanfrecce Hiroshima (Japan)	1–2	(Egypt) Al Ahly
Satō 32'	Report	Hamdy 15'; Aboutrika 56'

Toyota Stadium, Toyota
Attendance: 27,314
Referee: Carlos Vera (Ecuador)

=== Match for fifth place ===
12 December 2012
16:30

Ulsan Hyundai (South Korea)	2–3	(Japan) Sanfrecce Hiroshima
Mizumoto 17' (o.g.); Lee Yong 90+5'	Report	Yamagishi 35'; Satō 56', 72'

Toyota Stadium, Toyota
Attendance: 17,581
Referee: Nawaf Shukralla (Bahrain)

=== Semi-finals ===
12 December 2012
19:30

Al Ahly (Egypt)	0–1	(Brazil) Corinthians
	Report	Guerrero 30'

Toyota Stadium, Toyota
Attendance: 31,417
Referee: Marco Rodríguez (Mexico)

13 December 2012
19:30

Monterrey (Mexico)	1–3	(England) Chelsea
De Nigris 90+1'	Report	Mata 17'; Torres 46'; Chávez 48' (o.g.)

International Stadium Yokohama, Yokohama
Attendance: 36,648
Referee: Carlos Vera (Ecuador)

=== Match for third place ===
16 December 2012
16:30

Al Ahly (Egypt)	0–2	(Mexico) Monterrey
	Report	Corona 3'; Delgado 66'

International Stadium Yokohama, Yokohama
Attendance: 56,301
Referee: Peter O'Leary (New Zealand)

=== Final ===
16 December 2012
19:30

Corinthians (Brazil)	1–0	(England) Chelsea
Guerrero 69'	Report

International Stadium Yokohama, Yokohama
Attendance: 68,275
Referee: Cüneyt Çakır (Turkey)

== Goalscorers ==
Rank	Player	Team	Goals
1	(Argentina) César Delgado	(Mexico) Monterrey	3
1	(Japan) Hisato Satō	(Japan) Sanfrecce Hiroshima	3
3	(Peru) Paolo Guerrero	(Brazil) Corinthians	2
3	(Mexico) Jesús Corona	(Mexico) Monterrey	2
5	(Egypt) Mohamed Aboutrika	(Egypt) Al Ahly	1
5	(Egypt) Al-Sayed Hamdy	(Egypt) Al Ahly	1
5	(Spain) Juan Mata	(England) Chelsea	1
5	(Spain) Fernando Torres	(England) Chelsea	1
5	(Mexico) Aldo de Nigris	(Mexico) Monterrey	1
5	(Japan) Toshihiro Aoyama	(Japan) Sanfrecce Hiroshima	1
5	(Japan) Satoru Yamagishi	(Japan) Sanfrecce Hiroshima	1
5	(South Korea) Lee Keun-Ho	(South Korea) Ulsan Hyundai	1
5	(South Korea) Lee Yong	(South Korea) Ulsan Hyundai	1

1 own goal

- (Mexico) Dárvin Chávez (Monterrey, against Chelsea)
- (Japan) Hiroki Mizumoto (Sanfrecce Hiroshima, against Ulsan Hyundai)

== Awards ==
The following awards were given for the tournament.

Adidas Golden Ball Toyota Award	Adidas Silver Ball	Adidas Bronze Ball
(Brazil) Cássio (Corinthians)	(Brazil) David Luiz (Chelsea)	(Peru) Paolo Guerrero (Corinthians)
FIFA Fair Play Award
(Mexico) Monterrey
