= Adidas Trionda =

Football produced by Adidas for 2026 FIFA World Cup

Trionda
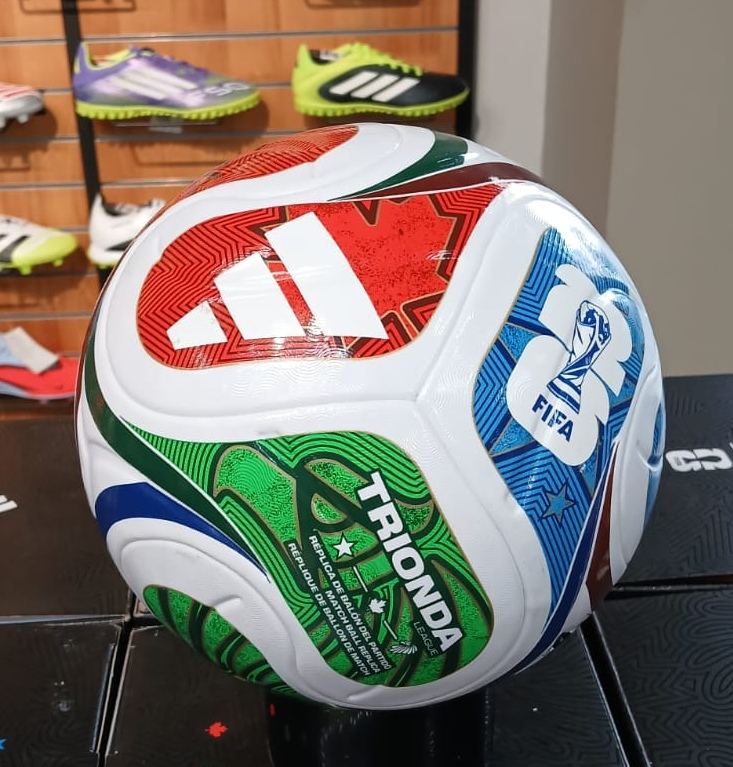
- Match ball replica
- Type: Football
- Inception: October 2, 2025
- Manufacturer: Adidas
- Available: Yes
- Current supplier: Forward Sports

The Adidas Trionda is a football produced by Adidas. It was the official match ball of the 2026 FIFA World Cup, hosted by the United States, Mexico, and Canada. It was introduced on October 2, 2025. The ball is thermally bonded together from just four panels, making it have the smallest number of panels on a ball used as the official match ball of the FIFA World Cup.

== Etymology ==
Trionda is created from the combination of the prefix tri-, which means "three" in many languages, such as English, French and Spanish, referring to the number of countries hosting the tournament, and onda, which in Spanish means "wave", thus "Triple Wave" or "Three Waves".

== Description ==
The Trionda's membrane is made of four thermally bonded polyurethane panels, the lowest number for any FIFA World Cup match ball so far. Like with the Al Rihla in 2022, its surface is textured with debossed macro and micro patterns (specifically on the ball's icons), meant to improve the ball's flight stability, swerve and grip in wet conditions.

The ball also features "connected ball technology," a side-mounted inertial measurement unit (IMU) chip inside one of the four panels (instead of suspended within the bladder like the Al Rihla) to provide the video assistant referee (VAR) with highly accurate ball movement data within seconds. This technology was developed with FIFA and Kinexon based in Munich.

The ball's color scheme and symbols are inspired by the iconography of the three nations – red with a maple leaf for Canada, green with a golden eagle's head for Mexico, and blue with a five-pointed star for the United States.

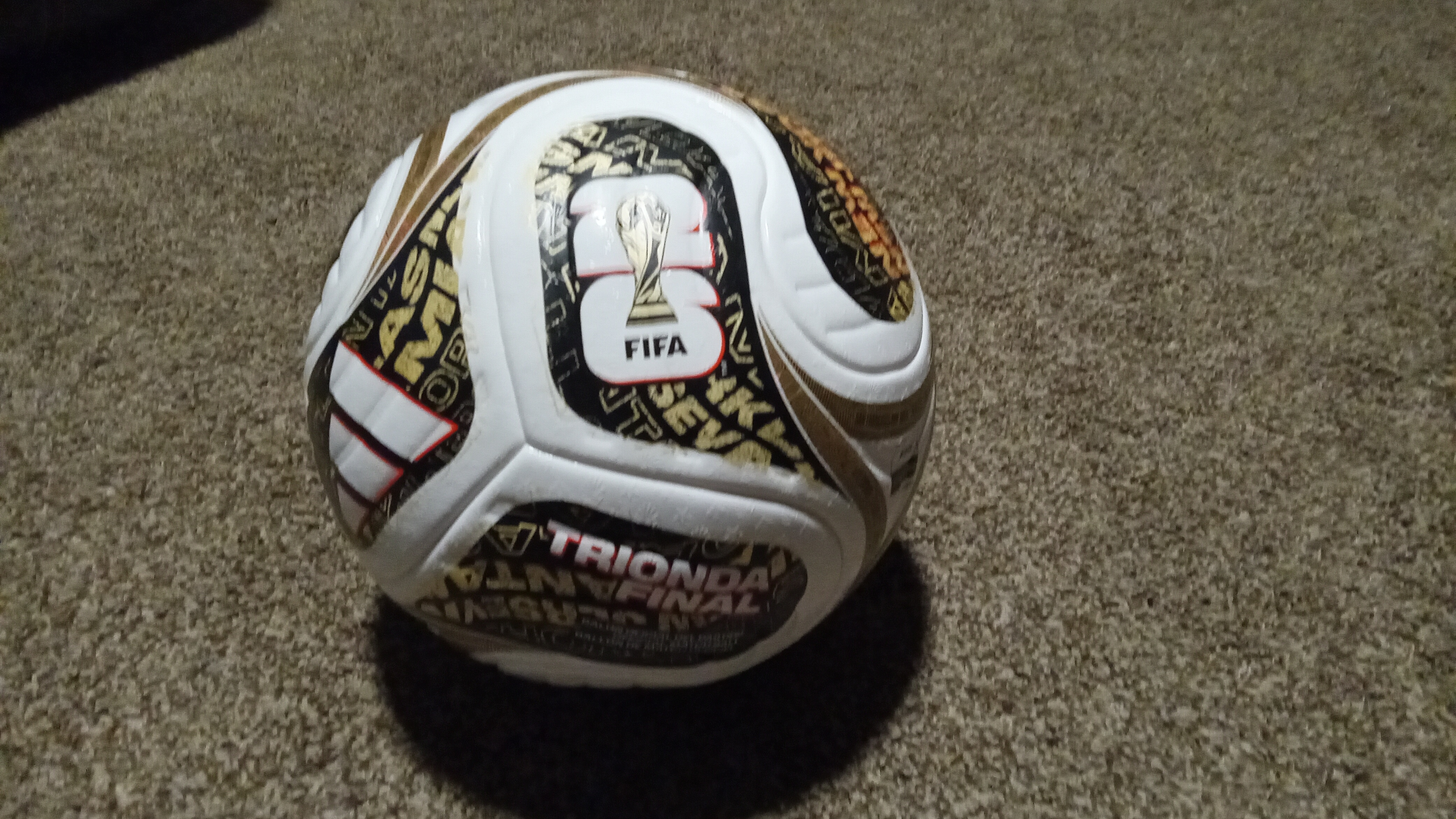
The Trionda Final

The Trionda Final was announced by Adidas on July 6, 2026 as the official match ball to be used for the semifinals, third place match and final. It features a gold, black, and red color scheme, with the host cities' names printed on it.

The Adidas Conext 26 was announced in December 2025 as the official match ball of 2025 FIFA Intercontinental Cup in Qatar, based on the same technology introduced in the Adidas Trionda.

== Production ==
The Trionda is manufactured in Sialkot by the Pakistani manufacturing company Forward Sports, who were also the manufacturers of the Al-Rihla.

== See also ==
- List of FIFA World Cup official match balls
- 2026 FIFA World Cup
