= Ball (association football) =

Spherical object used in association football

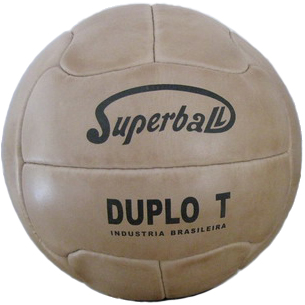
12-panel Duplo T

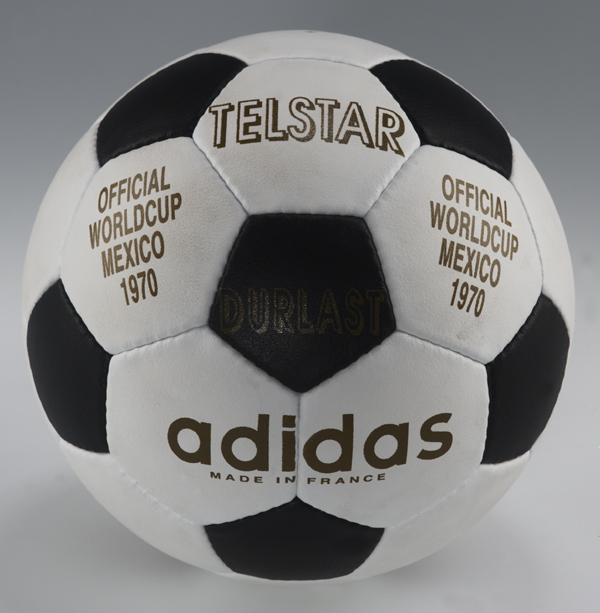
Iconic 32-panel Adidas Telstar

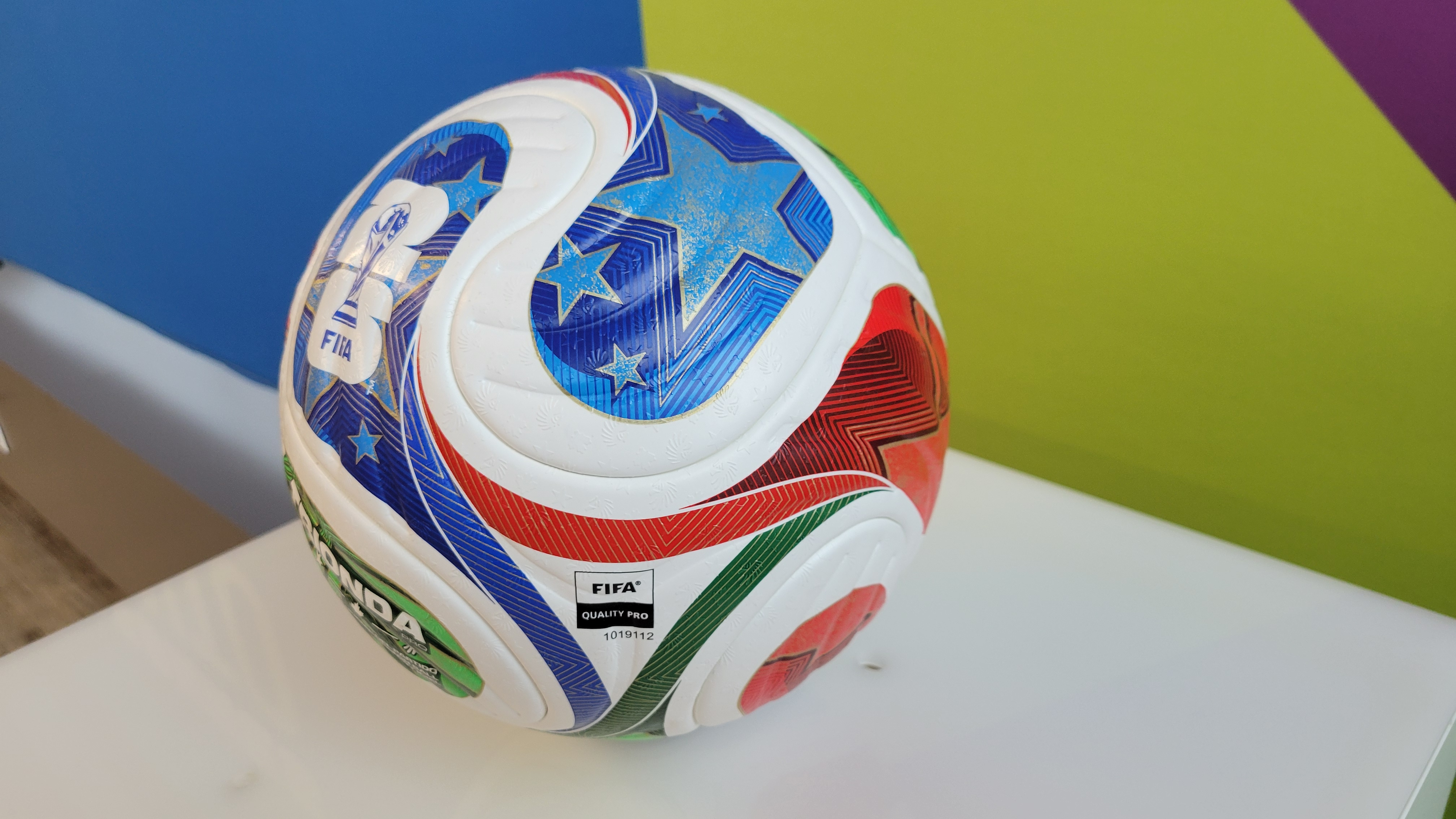
4-panel Adidas Trionda

A football or soccer ball is the ball used in the sport of association football. The ball's spherical shape, as well as its size, mass, and material composition, are specified by Law 2 of the Laws of the Game maintained by the International Football Association Board. Additional, more stringent standards are specified by FIFA and other governing bodies for the balls used in the competitions they sanction.

The modern 32-panel ball design was developed in 1962 by Eigil Nielsen. The design brought to prominence with Adidas Telstar which featured a black-and-white patterned spherical truncated icosahedron design, and has become a symbol of association football.

However, as technological research continues in order to develop footballs with improved performance, many different designs of balls exist, varying both in appearance and physical characteristics. The 32-panel ball design was joined by balls with different number of panels, as few as 4.

== History ==
=== First years of football codes ===
During medieval times balls were normally made from an outer shell of leather filled with cork shavings. Another method of creating a ball was using animal bladders to make it inflatable inside. However, these two styles of footballs were easy to puncture and were inadequate for kicking. It was not until the 19th century that footballs developed a more modern appearance. In 1863, the first specifications for footballs were set by the Football Association. Previous to this, footballs were made out of inflated animal bladder, with later leather coverings to help footballs maintain their shapes and sizes. In 1872, the specifications were revised and have been kept essentially unchanged by the International Football Association Board. Differences in footballs made since this rule came into effect have been with the material used to create them. Footballs have dramatically changed over time.

=== Vulcanization ===
In 1838, Charles Goodyear introduced vulcanized rubber, which dramatically improved football and became a stepping stone in the innovation of the ball. Vulcanization is the treatment of rubber to give it certain qualities such as strength, elasticity, and resistance to solvents. Vulcanization of rubber also helps the football resist moderate heat and cold. This is useful for when the game is played in harsh conditions such as mud and rain. Vulcanization helped create inflatable bladders that pressurize the outer panel arrangement of the football. Charles Goodyear's innovation increased the bounce ability of the ball and made it easier to kick. Most balls of this time had tanned leather with eighteen sections stitched together. These were arranged in six panels of three strips each.

=== Reasons for improvement ===
During the 1900s, footballs were made of leather, with a lace of the same material (known as tiento in Spanish) used to stitch the panels. While leather was ideal for bouncing and kicking the ball, heading the football (hitting it with the player's head) was often painful. This discomfort was likely due to the leather absorbing water from rain, which significantly increased the ball's mass and led to head or neck injuries. By around 2017, this had also been associated with dementia in former players. Another problem of early footballs was that they deteriorated quickly, as the plastic used in manufacturing varied in thickness and in quality. The ball without the leather lace was developed and patented by Romano Polo, Antonio Tossolini and Juan Valbonesi in 1931 in Bell Ville, Córdoba Province, Argentina. This innovative ball (named Superball) was adopted by the Argentine Football Association as the official ball for its competitions in 1932.

=== Latest developments ===
The deformation of the football when it is kicked or when the ball hits a surface is tested. Two styles of footballs have been tested by the Sports Technology Research Group of Wolfson School of Mechanical and Manufacturing Engineering in Loughborough University; these two models are called the Basic FE model and the Developed FE model of the football. The basic model considered the ball as a spherical shell with isotropic material properties. The developed model also used isotropic material properties but included an additional stiffer stitching seam region. Manufacturers are experimenting with microchips and even cameras embedded inside the ball. The microchip technology was considered for the goal-line technology. The ball used in the 2018 FIFA World Cup in Russia had an embedded chip which did not provide any measurements, but provided 'user experience' via smartphone after connecting with the ball via NFC. In the 2026 FIFA World Cup, Adidas will use a new ball with a mounted chip system, intended to help speed up the game's video assistant referee (VAR) system.

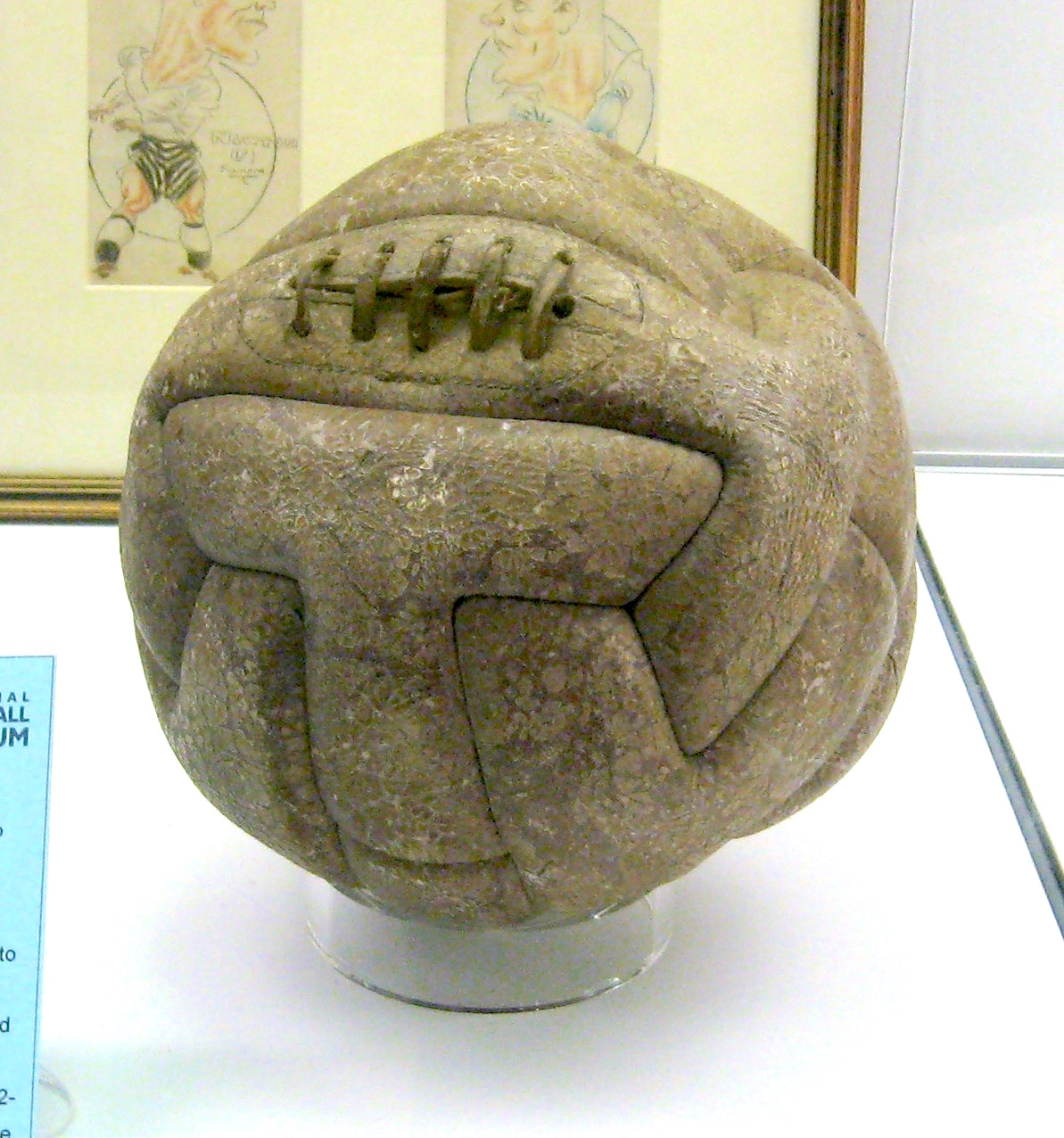
Early football ball (with its leather lace) used in the 1930 FIFA World Cup Final

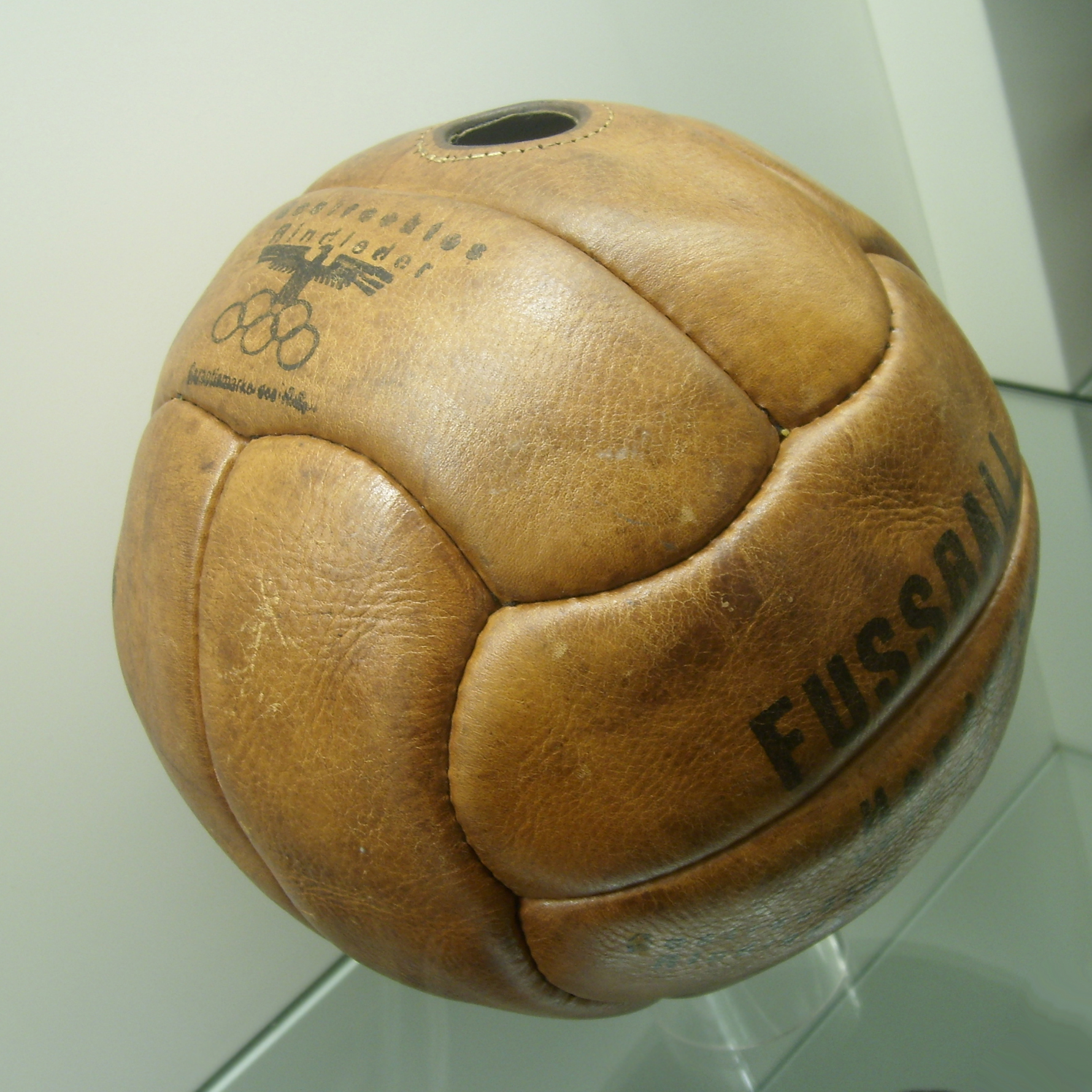
Leather ball used in the football tournament at the 1936 Summer Olympics

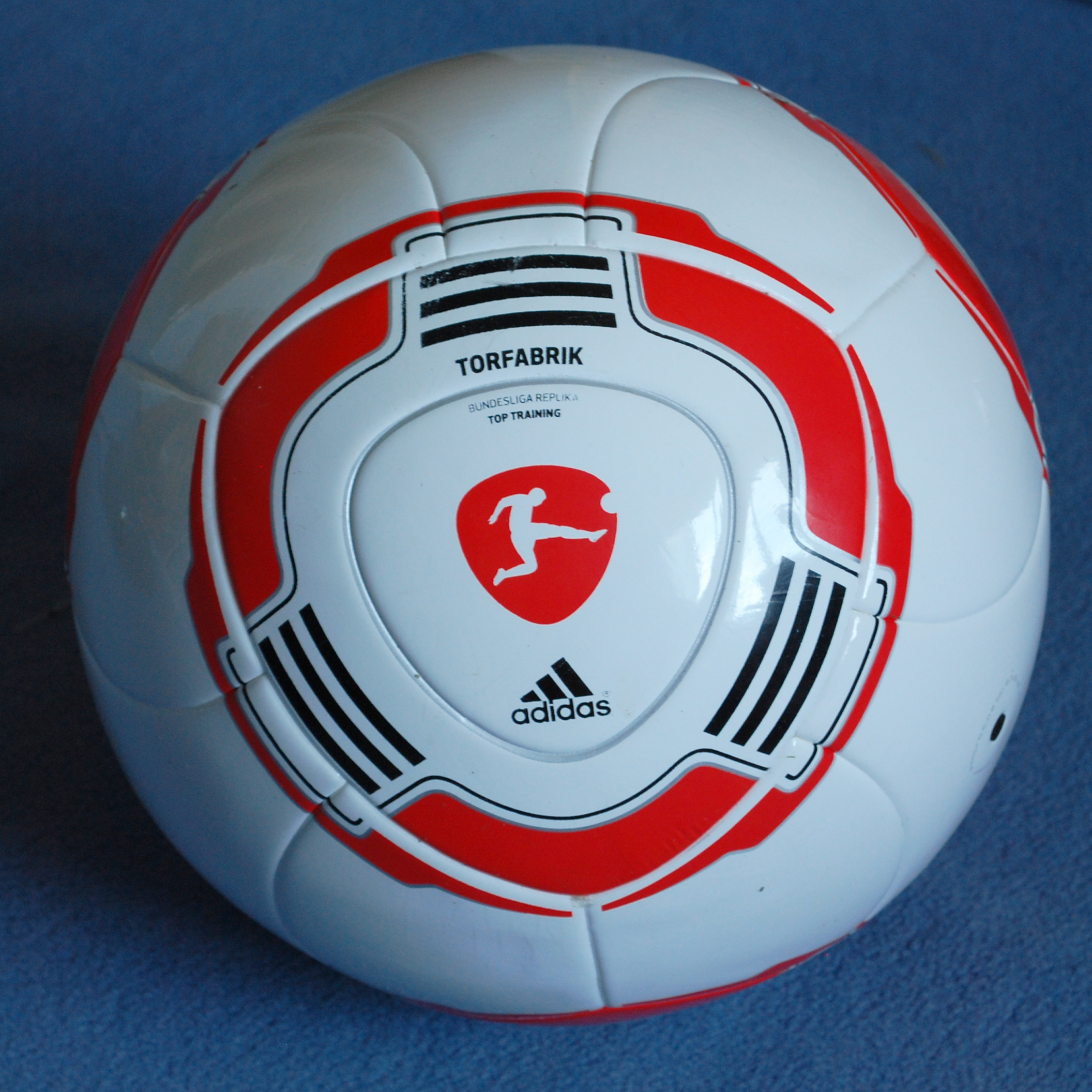
Adidas Torfabrik football used in the Bundesliga in 2011

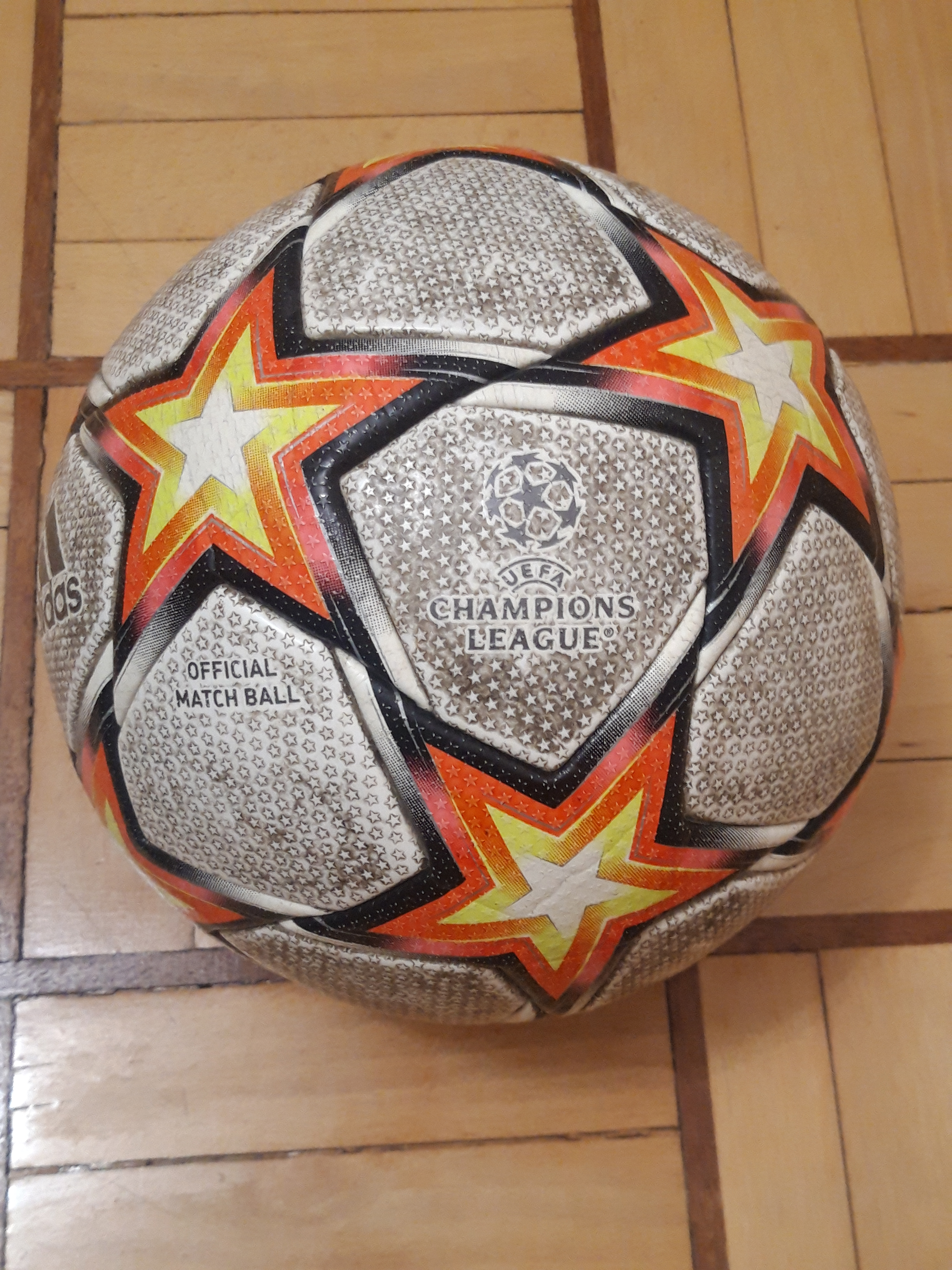
UEFA Champions League ball 2021–2022

== Specification ==
=== Construction ===
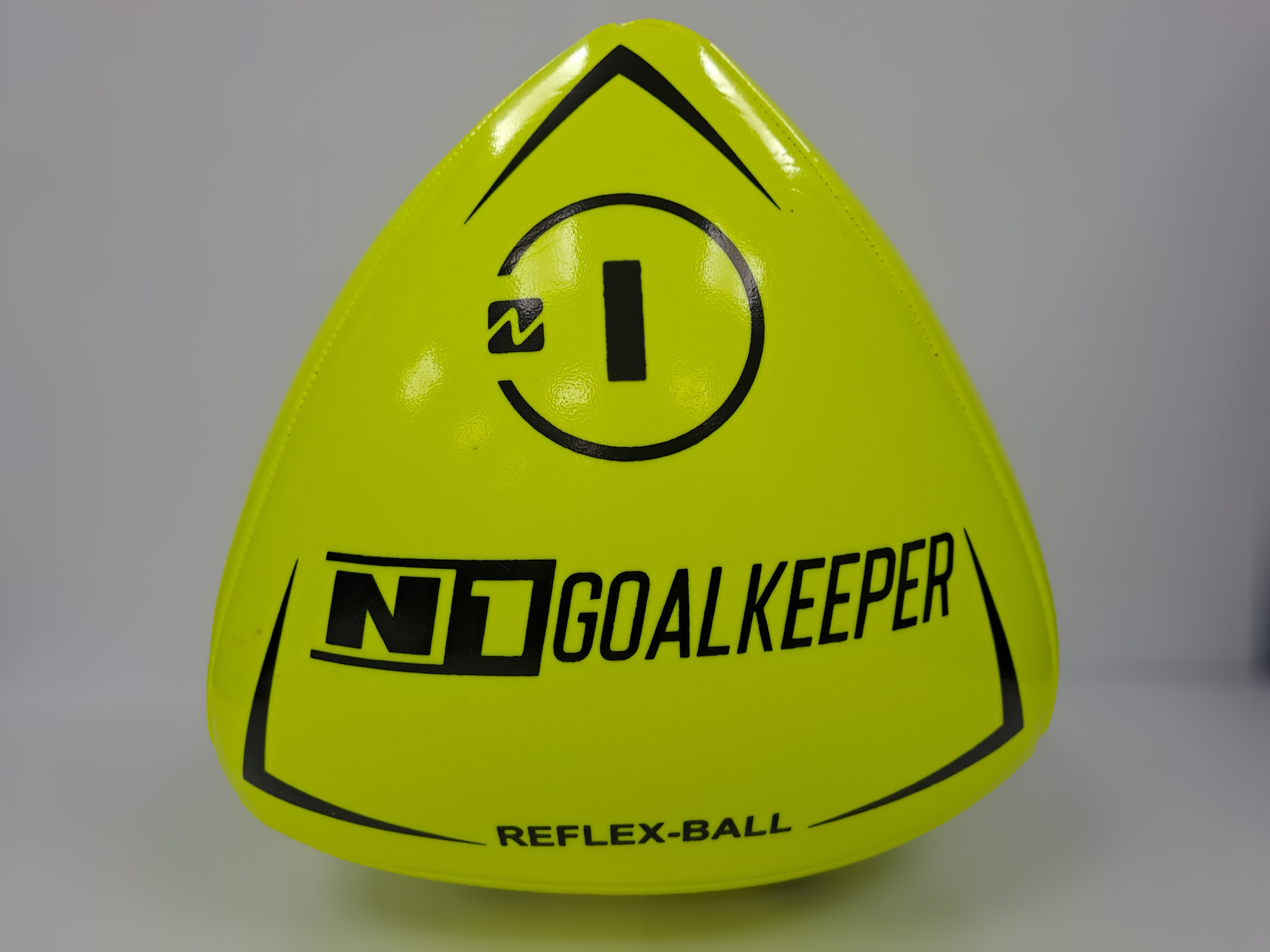
Non spherical reflex ball used in goalkeeper training

Modern footballs are more complex than past footballs. Most footballs consist of twelve regular pentagonal and twenty regular hexagonal panels positioned in a truncated icosahedron spherical geometry. Some premium-grade 32-panel balls use non-regular polygons to give a closer approximation to sphericality. The inside of the football is made up of a latex or butyl rubber bladder which enables the football to be pressurized. The ball's outside is made of leather, synthetic leather, polyurethane or PVC panels. The surface can be textured, weaved or embossed for greater control and touch. The panel pairs are either machine-stitched, hand-stitched or thermo-bonded (glued and bonded by heat) along the edge. To prevent water absorption, balls may be specially coated or the stitches bonded with glue.

=== Size and mass ===
Regulation size and mass for a football is a circumference of 68–70 cm (27–28 in), a diameter of 21.6–22.3 cm (8.5–8.8 in) and a mass of 410–450 g (14–16 oz). The ball is inflated to a pressure of 0.6–1.1 kilograms-force per square centimetre (59–108 kPa; 8.5–15.6 psi). This is known as "Size 5". Smaller balls, Sizes 1, 2, 3, and 4, are also produced for younger players or as training tools. Following consultations with football associations, clubs and ball manufacturers, FIFA has developed non-compulsory recommendations for appropriate sizes, circumferences and weights of balls for different age groups of youth football.

== Suppliers ==
Many companies throughout the world produce footballs. The earliest balls were made by local suppliers where the game was played. It is estimated that 70% of all footballs are made in Sialkot, Pakistan with other major producers being China and India. As a response to the problems with the balls in the 1962 FIFA World Cup, Adidas created the Adidas Santiago – this led to Adidas winning the contract to supply the match balls for all official FIFA and UEFA matches, which they have held since the 1970s, and also for the Olympic Games. They also supply the ball for the UEFA Champions League which is called the Adidas Finale.

=== FIFA World Cup ===
In early FIFA World Cups, match balls were mostly provided by the hosts from local suppliers. Records indicate a variety of models being used within individual tournaments and even, on some occasions, individual games. Over time, FIFA took more control over the choice of ball used. Since 1970, Adidas have supplied official match balls for every tournament.

1930 FIFA World Cup Final

The 1930 World Cup was the first FIFA-organized World Cup, but not the first international soccer tournament. Unlike post-1970 World Cups, no new balls were constructed for it. Each game, the two participating teams had to agree on a ball to play with. The T-model ball was by far the most used ball during this World Cup's games (used in 13/18 total games played). Up until the Final, Argentina and Uruguay (the finalists), preferred to use two different balls, the 12-panelled ball "Tiento" and the T-model balls, respectively. The two teams could not agree on a ball to use for the match and therefore, a compromise was made. For the first half, Argentina's "Tiento" was used; however, for the second half, a T-model ball would be used. Argentina won their half 2–1 after using their ball; however, Uruguay came back and won the match 4–2 after halftime. Notably, two T-model balls were used in the second half as the first became deflated. This is the only instance in a World Cup Final where two different types of balls were used.

2010 World Cup

For the 2010 World Cup, the ball awarded the honor of official match ball was the Adidas' Jabulani. This ball was actually the source of numerous criticisms regarding the ball's "supernatural" movements. Italian striker Giampaolo "Pazzo" Pazzini said "It's a disaster … When a cross comes in, you go to head the ball, but it moves half a meter and you end up just shaving it on contact". A large number of other footballers from various countries shared a similar sentiment, that this ball had unpredictable movements and was horrible. To name a few critics of this ball, Claudio Bravo, Luis Fabiano, Lionel Messi and even Denmark's coach Morten Olsen all described this ball as "Impossible". Some players however, such as Clint Dempsey of the United States, didn't share this negative sentiment towards Jabulani. The overall outcry against this ball sparked NASA scientists at the Fluid Mechanics Laboratory at NASA's Ames Research Center to test the performance of Jabulani versus the Teamgeist, which also received many criticisms, although substantially less than Jabulani. Rabi Mehta, an aerospace engineer at NASA Ames asserted that these players were likely "seeing a knuckle-ball effect". He elaborated that when a smooth seamed ball is hit head-on without much spin, the air on the surface is affected by the seams, producing an asymmetric airflow. This creates unbalanced side forces that can suddenly push the ball in one direction causing volatile movements, similar to the knuckleball pitch in baseball.

== Unicode ==
The association football symbol (U+26BD ⚽ SOCCER BALL) was introduced by computing standard Unicode. The symbol was representable in HTML as &#9917; or &#x26BD;. The addition of this symbol follows a 2008 proposal by Karl Pentzlin.

== See also ==
- Football (ball)
- Truncated icosahedron

== Bibliography ==
- Ghys, Étienne (2025). The Football: The Amazing Mathematics of the World's Most Watched Object. Translated by Lavender Fagan, Teresa. Princeton: Princeton University Press. ISBN 978-0-691-26312-0.
