= 2025 Supercopa de España final =

Final of the 40th edition of Supercopa de España

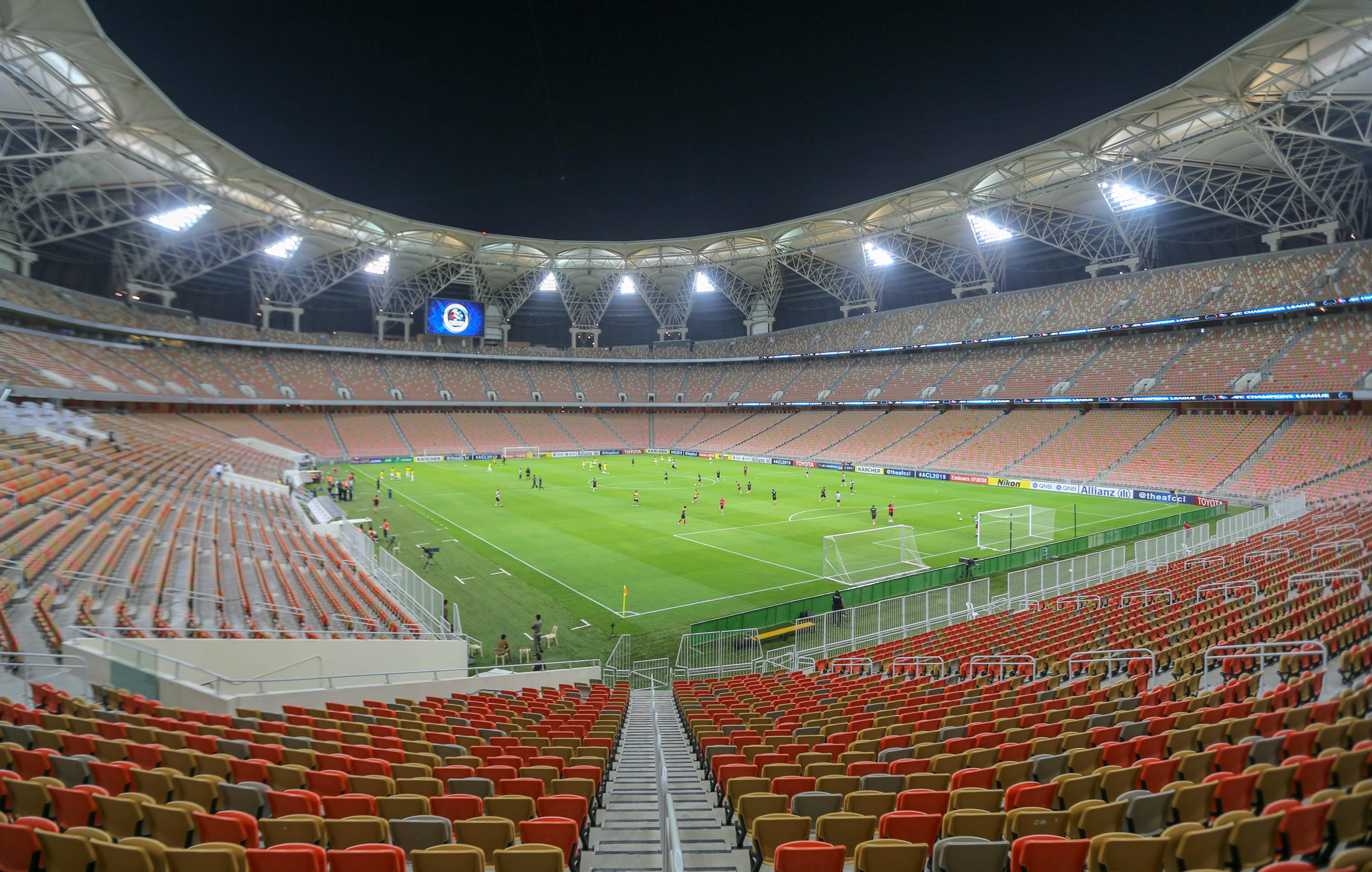
- The King Abdullah Sports City in Jeddah hosted the final.
- Event: 2025 Supercopa de España
Real Madrid	Barcelona
2	5
- Date: 12 January 2025
- Venue: King Abdullah Sports City, Jeddah
- Man of the Match: Raphinha (Barcelona)
- Referee: Jesús Gil Manzano (Extremadura)
- Attendance: 60,000
- Weather: Clear; 24 °C (75 °F); 41% humidity

The 2025 Supercopa de España final was a football match that decided the winner of the 2025 Supercopa de España, the 41st edition of the annual Spanish football super cup competition. The match was played on 12 January 2025 at the King Abdullah Sports City in Jeddah, Saudi Arabia. It was the 'El Clásico' between the 2023–24 La Liga winners Real Madrid and the 2023–24 La Liga runners-up Barcelona, the clubs meeting in the competition's decisive tie for the tenth time overall (until 2020, its format was simply a two-legged match); they also faced each other in the two previous finals, winning one each.

Barcelona won the match 5–2 for their 15th Supercopa de España title.

== Teams ==
Team	Qualification for tournament	Previous finals appearances (bold indicates winners)
Real Madrid	2023–24 La Liga winners	19 (1982, **1988**, **1989**, (Note: Real Madrid won the double in 1988–89, and thus were automatically awarded the Supercopa de España title for 1989.) **1990**, **1993**, 1995, **1997**, **2001**, **2003**, 2007, **2008**, 2011, **2012**, 2014, **2017**, **2020**, **2022**, 2023, **2024**)
Barcelona	2023–24 La Liga runners-up	26 (**1983**, 1985, 1988, 1990, **1991**, **1992**, 1993, **1994**, **1996**, 1997, 1998, 1999, **2005**, **2006**, **2009**, **2010**, **2011**, 2012, **2013**, 2015, **2016**, 2017, **2018**, 2021, **2023**, 2024)

== Route to the final ==
Real Madrid		Round	Barcelona	
Opponent	Result	2025 Supercopa de España	Opponent	Result
Mallorca	3–0	Semi-finals	Athletic Bilbao	2–0

== Match ==
=== Details ===
12 January 2025
22:00 AST

Real Madrid	2–5	Barcelona
Mbappé 5'; Rodrygo 60'	Report	Yamal 22'; Lewandowski 36' (pen.); Raphinha 39', 48'; Balde 45+10'

King Abdullah Sports City, Jeddah
Attendance: 60,000
Referee: Jesús Gil Manzano (Extremadura)

**Real Madrid**	**Barcelona**

GK	1	(Belgium) Thibaut Courtois
RB	17	(Spain) Lucas Vázquez (c)		(substituted off) 52'
CB	14	(France) Aurélien Tchouaméni	(yellow card) 62'	(substituted off) 64'
CB	22	(Germany) Antonio Rüdiger	(yellow card) 53'
LB	23	(France) Ferland Mendy		(substituted off) 75'
CM	8	(Uruguay) Federico Valverde
CM	6	(France) Eduardo Camavinga	(yellow card) 35'	(substituted off) 46'
RW	11	(Brazil) Rodrygo
AM	5	(England) Jude Bellingham		(substituted off) 76'
LW	7	(Brazil) Vinícius Júnior	(yellow card) 55'
CF	9	(France) Kylian Mbappé
Substitutes:
GK	13	(Ukraine) Andriy Lunin
GK	26	(Spain) Fran González
DF	4	(Austria) David Alaba
DF	20	(Spain) Fran García		(substituted on) 75'
DF	35	(Spain) Raúl Asencio	(yellow card) 77'	(substituted on) 52'
DF	39	(Spain) Lorenzo Aguado
MF	10	(Croatia) Luka Modrić		(substituted on) 64'
MF	15	(Turkey) Arda Güler
MF	19	(Spain) Dani Ceballos		(substituted on) 46'
FW	16	(Brazil) Endrick
FW	21	(Morocco) Brahim Díaz		(substituted on) 76'
Manager:
(Italy) Carlo Ancelotti

GK	25	(Poland) Wojciech Szczęsny	(red card) 56'
RB	23	(France) Jules Koundé
CB	2	(Spain) Pau Cubarsí
CB	5	(Spain) Iñigo Martínez	(yellow card) 45+9'	(substituted off) 28'
LB	3	(Spain) Alejandro Balde
CM	17	(Spain) Marc Casadó
CM	8	(Spain) Pedri
RW	19	(Spain) Lamine Yamal		(substituted off) 59'
AM	6	(Spain) Gavi		(substituted off) 59'
LW	11	(Brazil) Raphinha (c)	(yellow card) 89'	(substituted off) 79'
CF	9	(Poland) Robert Lewandowski	(yellow card) 77'
Substitutes:
GK	13	(Spain) Iñaki Peña		(substituted on) 59'
GK	26	(Spain) Ander Astralaga
DF	4	(Uruguay) Ronald Araújo	(yellow card) 87'	(substituted on) 28'
DF	24	(Spain) Eric García
DF	32	(Spain) Héctor Fort
DF	35	(Spain) Gerard Martín
MF	16	(Spain) Fermín López
MF	20	(Spain) Dani Olmo		(substituted on) 59'
MF	21	(Netherlands) Frenkie de Jong
FW	7	(Spain) Ferran Torres		(substituted on) 79'
FW	18	(Spain) Pau Víctor
Manager:
(Germany) Hansi Flick

Man of the Match:
Raphinha (Barcelona)

Assistant referees:
Ángel Nevado Rodríguez (Extremadura)
Javier Martínez Nicolás (Region of Murcia)
Fourth official:
Mario Melero López (Andalusia)
Reserve assistant referee:
Judit Romano García (Asturias)
Video assistant referee:
Javier Iglesias Villanueva (Galicia)
Assistant video assistant referees:
Antonio Cerezo Parfenof (Cantabria)
Pablo González Fuertes (Asturias)

**Match rules**

- 90 minutes.
- Penalty shoot-out if scores level.
- Eleven named substitutes, of which up to five may be used. (Note: Each team was given only three opportunities to make substitutions, excluding substitutions made at half-time.)

== See also ==
- 2024–25 FC Barcelona season
- 2024–25 Real Madrid CF season
