= Raúl Asencio =

Raúl Asencio may refer to:

- Raúl Asencio (footballer, born 1998), Spanish footballer
- Raúl Asencio (footballer, born 2003), Spanish footballer
