= Fernando Guerrero =

Fernando Guerrero may refer to:

- Fernando Guerrero (referee) (born 1981), Mexican football referee
- Fernando Guerrero (Ecuadorian footballer) (born 1989), Ecuadorian footballer
- Fernando Guerrero (boxer) (born 1986), Dominican Republic boxer
- Fernando María Guerrero (1873–1929), Filipino politician, journalist, lawyer and polyglot
- Fernando Guerrero (Spanish footballer) (born 2001), Spanish footballer
