= Ferran Ruiz =

Spanish footballer

Personal information
- Full name: Ferran Ruiz Martí
- Date of birth: 26 April 2003 (age 23)
- Place of birth: Olot, Spain
- Height: 1.72 m (5 ft 8 in)
- Position: Right-back

Youth career
- 2007–2013: Santa Pau
- 2013–2018: Girona
- 2018–2022: Real Madrid

Senior career*
Years	Team	Apps	(Gls)
2022–2023	RSC Internacional	29	(0)
2023–2024	Real Madrid C	28	(0)
2024–2026	Girona B	52	(1)
2024	Girona	1	(0)

International career
2018–2019	Spain U16	6	(0)
- * Club domestic league appearances and goals as of 15 May 2026

Ferran Ruiz Martí (born 26 April 2003) is a Spanish professional footballer who plays as a right-back.

== Club career ==
Born in Olot but raised in Santa Pau, both in the Province of Girona, Catalonia, Ruiz joined Real Madrid's youth setup in 2018, after representing Girona and Santa Pau. In August 2022, after finishing his formation, he was assigned to RSC International after Real Madrid reached an agreement with the club to make Internacional their C-team.

Ahead of the 2023–24 season, Ruiz was included in the squad of Real Madrid C also in the Tercera Federación, and helped the side to achieve promotion as champions of their group. On 12 July 2024, he returned to his former club Girona, being assigned to the reserves, also in the fifth division.

Ruiz made his first team – and La Liga – debut on 10 November 2024, coming on as a second-half substitute for Yangel Herrera in a 1–0 away win over Getafe; his debut brought heavily criticism to the club and to manager Míchel due to the controversy regarding his judicial issues.

== International career ==
Ruiz represented Spain at under-16 level.

== Personal life ==
In September 2023, Ruiz and three other Real Madrid players (Juan Rodríguez, Andrés Garcia and Raúl Asencio) were accused of diffusing a sexual video of a minor.
