= Fernando Guerrero (Spanish footballer) =

Spanish footballer

Personal information
- Full name: Fernando Delgado Guerrero
- Date of birth: 1 August 2001 (age 25)
- Place of birth: Madrid, Spain
- Height: 1.82 m (6 ft 0 in)
- Position: Midfielder

Team information
- Current team: Móstoles URJC
- Number: 16

Youth career
- 2009–2013: Colegio Vallmont
- 2013–2014: Las Rozas
- 2014–2019: Rayo Majadahonda
- 2019–2020: Real Madrid

Senior career*
Years	Team	Apps	(Gls)
2018–2019	Rayo Majadahonda	4	(0)
2020–2022	Real Madrid B	0	(0)
2020–2021	→ Barakaldo (loan)	18	(1)
2021–2022	→ Fuenlabrada Promesas (loan)	38	(4)
2022–2023	RSC Internacional	10	(1)
2023–2024	Huesca B	31	(3)
2024–	Móstoles URJC	7	(0)
- * Club domestic league appearances and goals as of 12 October 2024

Fernando Delgado Guerrero (born 1 August 2001) is a Spanish footballer who plays as a central midfielder for Móstoles URJC.

== Club career ==
Born in Madrid, Guerrero represented Colegio Vallmont, Las Rozas CF and CF Rayo Majadahonda as a youth. On 2 December 2018, aged just 17, he made his professional debut by starting in a 0–0 home draw against Deportivo de La Coruña, in the Segunda División championship.

On 18 January 2019, Guerrero renewed his contract until 2021. On 28 June, Real Madrid reached an agreement with Rayo Majadahonda for the transfer of Guerrero; he initially returned to the youth setup.

On 8 September 2020, after finishing his formation, Guerrero was loaned to Segunda División B side Barakaldo CF for the season. The following 27 August, he moved to CF Fuenlabrada also in a temporary deal, being initially assigned to the reserves in Tercera División RFEF.

Upon returning, Guerrero was assigned to fellow fifth tier RSC Internacional FC as the club was acting as Real Madrid's C-team. On 30 August 2023, he moved to SD Huesca and was initially assigned to the reserves in the same division.
