= 2024–25 Real Madrid CF season =

121st season of Real Madrid CF

Real Madrid
2024–25 season
- President: Florentino Pérez
- Head coach: Carlo Ancelotti (until 25 May); Xabi Alonso (from 1 June)
- Stadium: Santiago Bernabéu
- La Liga: 2nd
- Copa del Rey: Runners-up
- Supercopa de España: Runners-up
- UEFA Champions League: Quarter-finals
- UEFA Super Cup: Winners
- FIFA Intercontinental Cup: Winners
- FIFA Club World Cup: Semi-finals
- Top goalscorer: League: Kylian Mbappé (31); All: Kylian Mbappé (44)
- Highest home attendance: 81,044 vs Real Sociedad
- Lowest home attendance: 60,753 vs Mallorca
- Average home league attendance: 72,711
- Biggest win: 5–0 vs Minera
- Biggest defeat: 0–4 vs Barcelona; 0–4 vs Paris Saint-Germain
Home colours	Away colours	Third colours

The 2024–25 season was Real Madrid Club de Fútbol's 121st season in existence and the club's 94th consecutive season in the top flight of Spanish football. In addition to the domestic league, Real Madrid participated in this season's editions of the Copa del Rey, the Supercopa de España and the UEFA Champions League.

As the reigning European champions, Real Madrid contested the UEFA Super Cup against Atalanta, winning 2–0 and claiming a record-breaking sixth title, then went on to win the inaugural edition of the FIFA Intercontinental Cup, beating Pachuca 3–0 in the final, and also competed in the FIFA Club World Cup where they reached the semi-finals. With these two wins, Carlo Ancelotti conquered his 14th and 15th trophies in charge of Real Madrid, overtaking Miguel Muñoz to become the most decorated manager in the club's history. This season also marked the end of Ancelotti's second managerial stint at the club, as he was replaced by Xabi Alonso after the conclusion of La Liga.

This season was the first since 2013–14 without Toni Kroos, who announced his retirement in May 2024, as well as first since 2009–10 without Nacho, who departed as a free agent to Saudi Arabian club Al-Qadsiah.

== Summary ==
=== Pre-season ===
On 15 December 2022, during the 2022–23 season, Madrid announced an agreement with Palmeiras for Endrick to join the club in July 2024, when he turns 18 years old. On 21 May 2024, Toni Kroos announced that he will retire from professional football after UEFA Euro 2024, thus ending his 10 seasons in the club with 23 trophies won as a Real Madrid player. On 3 June, Madrid confirmed the signing of Kylian Mbappé from Paris Saint-Germain as a free agent, penning a five-year deal with the French superstar. On 25 June, Madrid announced the departure of the club captain Nacho after 23 years in the club and 12 seasons as a first team player, who left as Real's joint most decorated player, having won 26 titles. On 28 June, Madrid announced the transfer of Joselu to Qatari side Al-Gharafa, exercising their option to acquire the rights of the player from Espanyol one day earlier. On 17 July, Luka Modrić signed a one-year extension, staying at the club until 2025. The next day, Lucas Vázquez extended his contract until 2025. On 19 July, Madrid confirmed that Endrick would sign a six-year deal.

=== August ===
On 14 August, Madrid's season started with a 2–0 win over Atalanta in the UEFA Super Cup for their sixth European Super Cup title, as a tap-in from Federico Valverde was followed up by Mbappé's debut goal for the club. In doing so, Real became the most successful club in the competition's history, breaking a three-way tie of five victories each along with Barcelona and Milan. Four days later, Madrid started their league title-defence campaign at Mallorca, as the gamed ended 1–1, with Rodrygo scoring the only goal for his team. On 25 August, strikes from Valverde and Brahim Díaz, as well as the debut goal from Endrick, helped Madrid to take a 3–0 victory over Real Valladolid at the Santiago Bernabéu. Four days later, Madrid was held to a 1–1 away draw against Las Palmas, as Vinícius Júnior converted his penalty to rescue one point for Los Blancos.

=== September ===
Madrid opened the month with a 2–0 home win against Real Betis on 1 September, as Mbappé got on the scoresheet twice. On 13 September, Andriy Lunin signed a new deal until 2030. The next day, Madrid returned from the international break, winning 2–0 at Real Sociedad, with Vinícius and Mbappé both scoring from the penalty spot. On 17 September, Madrid played their first match in the new Champions League league phase format to begin their European defending champions campaign, as Mbappé, Antonio Rüdiger and Endrick scored in a 3–1 victory over VfB Stuttgart. Four days later, goals from Dani Carvajal, Rodrygo, Vinícius and Mbappé helped Madrid to take a 4–1 home comeback win against Espanyol. On 24 September, Madrid beat Alavés 3–2 at home with the help of goals from Vázquez, Mbappé and Rodrygo. Five days later, Real played against Atlético Madrid at the Metropolitano Stadium, as the first Madrid derby of the season ended in a 1–1 draw, with Éder Militão scoring the only goal for his team.

=== October ===
On 2 October, Madrid began the month with their first defeat of the season, a 1–0 Champions League loss to Lille that also ended team's 36-match unbeaten run. Three days later, a home match against Villarreal ended in a 2–0 win for Madrid, as Valverde and Vinícius got on the scoresheet. The next day, following Carvajal's long-term knee injury, Madrid extended his contract until 2026. On 19 October, returning from another international break, Madrid faced Celta Vigo away from home, as Mbappé's strike from outside the box was followed up by a second-half winner by Vinícius to give their team a 2–1 win. Three days later, a header from Rüdiger alongside Vinícius' second-half hat-trick and a goal from Vázquez rescued Madrid from trailing 0–2 at half-time to prevailing 5–2 at home over Champions League opponents Borussia Dortmund. On 26 October, Madrid was stunned by a 0–4 loss to Barcelona in the first El Clásico of the season. This defeat also ended Real's 42-game unbeaten streak in La Liga, just one short of equaling the league record.

=== November ===
On 5 November, the first match of the month ended in another defeat for Madrid, this time losing 1–3 at home to Milan in the Champions League, with Vinícius scoring the only goal for his team. Four days later, Madrid took a 4–0 victory against Osasuna, with Vinícius' second hat-trick of the season being joined by Jude Bellingham's first goal for Real since May. On 24 November, goals from Mbappé, Valverde and Bellingham gave Madrid a dominant 3–0 win at Leganés. Three days later, Madrid was beaten 0–2 by Liverpool in the Champions League at the Anfield in their first loss against the English side since 2009.

=== December ===
On 1 December, Madrid began the month with a 2–0 victory over Getafe at the Santiago Bernabéu, as Bellingham and Mbappé got on the scoresheet in the first half. Three days later, Madrid suffered their second league defeat of the season, losing 1–2 at Athletic Bilbao in El Viejo Clásico, as late Bellingham's goal was not enough to rescue a point for Real. On 7 December, Madrid played Girona away from home, winning 3–0, thanks to Bellingham's fifth consecutive La Liga goal and strikes from Güler and Mbappé. Three days later, Madrid beat Atalanta 3–2 on their pitch in the Champions league, as Mbappé, Vinícius and Bellingham scored the goals for Los Blancos. On 14 December, Madrid was held to a 3–3 draw at Rayo Vallecano, with Valverde, Bellingham and Rodrygo scoring for the team. Four days later, Madrid were crowned as the inaugural FIFA Intercontinental Cup champions, beating Pachuca 3–0 in the final with the help of goals from Mbappé, Rodrygo and Vinícius. On 22 December, Madrid ended the year with a dominant display in a 4–2 home win over Sevilla, as Mbappé, Valverde, Rodrygo and Brahim found the back of the net for Real.

=== January ===
On 3 January, Madrid played their first game of the year, where late goals from Modrić and Bellingham powered a 2–1 comeback win at Valencia. Three days later, Madrid began their Copa del Rey campaign, beating fourth-tier Minera 5–0 and progressing to the round of 16, thanks to goals from Valverde and Eduardo Camavinga, followed up by a brace from Güler and a finish from Modrić. On 9 January, goals from Bellingham and Rodrygo, as well as an own goal, helped Madrid win the Supercopa de España semi-final against Mallorca 3–0 and reach the final. Three days later, Madrid suffered another big defeat in El Clásico this season, losing 2–5 to Barcelona in the Spanish Super Cup final, as the only goals for the team came from Mbappé and Rodrygo. On 16 January, goals from Mbappé and Vinícius in a Copa del Rey round of 16 match against Celta Vigo led Madrid to extra time, where a brace from Endrick was joined by Valverde's strike to give Real a 5–2 home win and qualification for the next round. Three days later, Madrid got a 4–1 win over Las Palmas with the help of two goals from Mbappé followed by strikes from Brahim and Rodrygo to move top of La Liga. The match also marked David Alaba's return from his ACL injury. On 22 January, Rodrygo's and Vinícius' braces with a goal from Mbappé helped Madrid to take a crushing 5–1 victory over Red Bull Salzburg in the Champions League. Three days later, Mbappé scored his first hat-trick for the club, netting all three goals in a 3–0 win at Real Valladolid. On 29 January, Madrid faced Brest on the road in the Champions League and beat them 3–0 with Rodrygo's brace and a goal from Bellingham, qualifying to the knockout phase play-offs.

=== February ===
On 1 February, Madrid started the month with their third league defeat of the season, losing 0–1 away to Espanyol. Four days later, Madrid progressed to the Copa del Rey semi-finals over Leganés, as goals from Modrić and Endrick combined with an injury time winner from academy's Gonzalo García gave Real a 3–2 victory. On 8 February, the second Madrid derby of the season ended in a 1–1 draw at the Bernabéu, as Mbappé's equaliser was not enough for three points against Atlético Madrid. On 11 February, Madrid took on Manchester City at the City of Manchester Stadium, rematching the last season's Champions League quarter-finals encounter, but facing the English side in the knockout phase play-offs this time. A goal from Mbappé, as well as two late strikes from Brahim and Bellingham, helped Madrid to prevail 3–2 in the first leg for their 300th win in the competition and the first ever at City's home stadium. Four days later, Madrid lost points for the third time in a row, drawing 1–1 at Osasuna with a goal from Mbappé. On 19 February, Mbappé's hat-trick gave Madrid a 3–1 win against Champions League knockout phase play-offs opponents Manchester City, sending the team to the round of 16 with a 6–3 victory over two legs. Four days later, Girona was beaten 2–0 at the Bernabéu with the help of goals from Modrić and Vinícius. On 26 February, a lone goal from Endrick was enough for a 1–0 win in the Copa del Rey semi-finals first leg at Real Sociedad.

=== March ===
On 1 March, Madrid suffered a 1–2 loss at Real Betis, with Brahim scoring the only goal for his team. Three days later, the first leg of the Champions League round of 16 against Atlético Madrid ended in a 2–1 Madrid derby win at home, as Rodrygo and Brahim got on the scoresheet. On 9 March, Mbappé and Vinícius scored one goal each, combining for a 2–1 win over Rayo Vallecano. Three days later, Madrid's 0–1 loss at Atlético Madrid in the return leg of the Champions League last-16 tie was followed by a goalless extra time and a 4–2 penalty shootout win, sending the team to the quarter-finals. On 15 March, a brace from Mbappé saw Madrid beat Villarreal 2–1 away from home. Madrid returned to action on 29 March, getting a 3–2 win over Leganés at the Bernabéu with the help of brace from Mbappé and a goal from Bellingham.

=== April ===
Madrid began the month on 1 April with the second leg of the Copa del Rey semi-final against Real Sociedad. Regular time goals from Endrick, Bellingham and Aurélien Tchouaméni were followed up by Rüdiger's extra time equaliser for a 4–4 draw at home, sending the team to the final 5–4 on aggregate. Four days later, Madrid was beaten 1–2 by Valencia at home, as Vinícius scored the only goal for Real. On 8 April, Madrid was stomped 0–3 in the first leg of the Champions League quarter-final against Arsenal at the Emirates Stadium. Five days later, a lone goal from Camavinga sealed a 1–0 win at Alavés. On 16 April, Madrid got knocked out of the Champions League, losing 1–2 to Arsenal in the return leg of the quarter-final with a goal from Vinícius and 1–5 on aggregate. Five days later, late goal from Valverde gave Madrid a minimal 1–0 win against Athletic Bilbao. On 23 April, Güler's shot outside the box helped Madrid to take a 1–0 win over Getafe. Three days later, Madrid met Barcelona in the Copa del Rey final. A 2–2 draw in the regular time required extra time, where a late goal from Blaugrana sealed a 3–2 win and the title for them.

=== May ===
On 4 May, Madrid began the month with a victory, as Güler's goal with a brace from Mbappé gave their team a 3–2 win over Celta Vigo at the Santiago Bernabéu. A week later, Barcelona handed Madrid a 3–4 defeat, as Mbappé's hat-trick was not enough for points away from home. With this result, Real lost four consecutive El Clásicos of the campaign for the second time in their history. On 14 May, Madrid faced Mallorca at home, as Mbappé's goal was followed up by a late winner from Castilla's Jacobo Ramón to give his team a 2–1 win. Three days later, Madrid announced the signing of Dean Huijsen from Bournemouth, with the Spanish center-back joining the club on 1 June and signing a five-year contract. On 18 May, Madrid beat nine-man Sevilla 2–0 away from home with second-half goals from Mbappé and Bellingham. Five days later, Madrid and Carlo Ancelotti announced their mutual decision to part ways after the conclusion of La Liga, with the Italian coach leaving as the most decorated manager in the history of the club with 15 trophies. On 24 May, Modrić and Ancelotti bid a farewell to the Bernabéu, as a brace from Mbappé saw Madrid beat Real Sociedad 2–0 in the season’s last league game. The next day, Madrid announced the appointment of Xabi Alonso as their new head coach for the next three seasons, starting from 1 June. On 30 May, Madrid and Liverpool announced an agreement for the transfer of Trent Alexander-Arnold, with the Englishman joining the club on 1 June on a six-year deal. On the same day, the club announced the departure of Jesús Vallejo upon the expiration of his contract.

=== June ===
On 18 June, Madrid debuted in the new format of the FIFA Club World Cup, being held to a 1–1 draw by Al-Hilal after Gonzalo García's goal. Four days later, Madrid got their first win of the tournament, beating Pachuca 3–1 with goals from Bellingham, Güler and Valverde. On 26 June, Madrid booked their place in the knockout stage, as Vinícius, Valverde and Gonzalo García scored to help Real top the group with a 3–0 win over Red Bull Salzburg. Five days later, a lone goal from Gonzalo García sealed a 1–0 win over round of 16 opponents Juventus and progression to the quarter-finals. On 5 July, Madrid met Borussia Dortmund in a match for the spot in the semi-finals, beating them 3–2 with goals from Gonzalo García, Fran García and Mbappé. On 9 July, Madrid ended their season with a 0–4 loss against Paris Saint-Germain, getting knocked out in the FIFA Club World Cup semi-finals. This match was the last for Modrić and Vázquez in a Los Blancos shirt, but also saw the returns of Carvajal and Militão from their long-term knee injuries.

== Kits ==
=== 2024–25 season ===
Home	Away	Third	Goalkeeper 1	Goalkeeper 2	Goalkeeper 3

=== FIFA Club World Cup ===
Home	Away	Goalkeeper 1	Goalkeeper 2

== Players ==
Note: Flags indicate national team as defined under FIFA eligibility rules; some limited exceptions apply. Players may hold more than one non-FIFA nationality.

No.	Pos.	Nation	Player
1	GK	BEL	Thibaut Courtois
2	DF	ESP	Dani Carvajal (vice-captain)
3	DF	BRA	Éder Militão
4	DF	AUT	David Alaba
5	MF	ENG	Jude Bellingham
6	MF	FRA	Eduardo Camavinga
7	FW	BRA	Vinícius Júnior
8	MF	URU	Federico Valverde
9	FW	FRA	Kylian Mbappé
10	MF	CRO	Luka Modrić (captain)
11	FW	BRA	Rodrygo
12	DF	ENG	Trent Alexander-Arnold (from 1 June 2025)
13	GK	UKR	Andriy Lunin

No.	Pos.	Nation	Player
14	MF	FRA	Aurélien Tchouaméni
15	MF	TUR	Arda Güler
16	FW	BRA	Endrick
17	DF	ESP	Lucas Vázquez
18	DF	ESP	Jesús Vallejo (until 1 June 2025)
19	MF	ESP	Dani Ceballos
20	DF	ESP	Fran García
21	FW	MAR	Brahim Díaz
22	DF	GER	Antonio Rüdiger
23	DF	FRA	Ferland Mendy
24	DF	ESP	Dean Huijsen (from 1 June 2025)
35	DF	ESP	Raúl Asencio

== Transfers ==
=== In ===
Date	Pos.	Player	From	Type	Ref.
1 July 2024	DF	(Spain) Jesús Vallejo	Granada	End of loan	
1 July 2024	FW	(France) Kylian Mbappé	(France) Paris Saint-Germain	Free transfer	
21 July 2024	FW	(Brazil) Endrick	(Brazil) Palmeiras	Transfer	
1 June 2025	DF	(Spain) Dean Huijsen (Note: Transfer for the 2025–26 season, but eligible to start in the 2024–25 for the 2025 FIFA Club World Cup.)	(England) Bournemouth	Transfer	
1 June 2025	DF	(England) Trent Alexander-Arnold	(England) Liverpool	Transfer	

=== Out ===
Date	Pos.	Player	To	Type	Ref.
1 July 2024	GK	(Spain) Kepa Arrizabalaga	(England) Chelsea	End of loan	
1 July 2024	DF	(Spain) Nacho	(Saudi Arabia) Al Qadsiah	End of contract	
1 July 2024	MF	(Germany) Toni Kroos	Retired		
1 July 2024	FW	(Spain) Joselu	(Qatar) Al-Gharafa	Transfer	
1 June 2025	DF	(Spain) Jesús Vallejo	Albacete	End of contract	

=== Contract renewals ===
Date	Pos.	Player	Contract length	Contract ends	Ref.
17 July 2024	MF	(Croatia) Luka Modrić	One year	2025	
18 July 2024	DF	(Spain) Lucas Vázquez	One year	2025	
13 September 2024	GK	(Ukraine) Andriy Lunin	Five years	2030	
6 October 2024	DF	(Spain) Dani Carvajal	One year	2026	

== Pre-season and friendlies ==
On 19 March 2024, Real Madrid announced they would travel to the United States to participate in the pre-season Soccer Champions Tour.

24 July 2024 1	Real Madrid	3–0	Albacete	Madrid
19:30 UTC+1	Brahim; Latasa; Reinier	Report		Stadium: Ciudad Real Madrid; Attendance: 0 (Note: The match was played behind closed doors.)

31 July 2024 2	Milan	1–0	Real Madrid	Chicago, United States
19:30 UTC−5	Chukwueze 55'	Report		Stadium: Soldier Field; Attendance: 61,568; Referee: Rubiel Vazquez (United States)

3 August 2024 3	Real Madrid	1–2	Barcelona	East Rutherford, United States
19:00 UTC−4	Paz 82'	Report	Víctor 42', 54'	Stadium: MetLife Stadium; Attendance: 82,154; Referee: Armando Villarreal (United States)
Note: The match was delayed in the 12th minute due to lightning, and resumed at 20:30 UTC−4.

6 August 2024 4	Real Madrid	2–1	Chelsea	Charlotte, United States
19:00 UTC−4	Vázquez 19'; Brahim 27'	Report	Madueke 39'	Stadium: Bank of America Stadium; Attendance: 62,617; Referee: Guido Gonzales Jr. (United States)

== Competitions ==
=== Overview ===
Competition	First match	Last match	Starting round	Final position	Record							
Competition	First match	Last match	Starting round	Final position	Pld	W	D	L	GF	GA	GD	Win %
La Liga	18 August 2024	24 May 2025	Matchday 1	2nd	38	26	6	6	78	38	+40	68.42
Copa del Rey	6 January 2025	26 April 2025	Round of 32	Runners-up	6	4	1	1	20	11	+9	66.67
Supercopa de España	9 January 2025	12 January 2025	Semi-finals	Runners-up	2	1	0	1	5	5	+0	50.00
UEFA Champions League	17 September 2024	16 April 2025	League phase	Quarter-finals	14	8	0	6	29	22	+7	57.14
UEFA Super Cup	14 August 2024		Final	Winners	1	1	0	0	2	0	+2	100.00
FIFA Intercontinental Cup	18 December 2024		Final	Winners	1	1	0	0	3	0	+3	100.00
FIFA Club World Cup	18 June 2025	9 July 2025	Group stage	Semi-finals	6	4	1	1	11	8	+3	66.67
Total					68	45	8	15	148	84	+64	66.18

Source: Soccerway

=== La Liga ===
==== League table ====
Pos	Team	Pld	W	D	L	GF	GA	GD	Pts	Qualification or relegation
1	Barcelona (C)	38	28	4	6	102	39	+63	88	Qualification for the Champions League league stage (Note: La Liga gained an additional Champions League place as a result of Spain gaining one of the two European Performance Spots (EPS) awarded to the two associations with the highest UEFA coefficient points in 2024–25.)
2	Real Madrid	38	26	6	6	78	38	+40	84	Qualification for the Champions League league stage
3	Atlético Madrid	38	22	10	6	68	30	+38	76	Qualification for the Champions League league stage
4	Athletic Bilbao	38	19	13	6	54	29	+25	70 (Note: Athletic Bilbao finished ahead of Villarreal on head-to-head points: Athletic Bilbao 2–0 Villarreal, Villarreal 0–0 Athletic Bilbao.)	Qualification for the Champions League league stage
5	Villarreal	38	20	10	8	71	51	+20	70	Qualification for the Champions League league stage

Source: LaLiga EA Sports
Rules for classification: 1) Points; 2) Head-to-head points; 3) Head-to-head goal difference; 4) Goal difference; 5) Goals scored; 6) Fair-play points
(Note: Head-to-head record is used only after all the matches between the teams in question have been played)
(C) Champions

==== Results summary ====
Overall								Home						Away					
Pld	W	D	L	GF	GA	GD	Pts	W	D	L	GF	GA	GD	W	D	L	GF	GA	GD
38	26	6	6	78	38	+40	84	16	1	2	45	19	+26	10	5	4	33	19	+14

Source: La Liga

==== Results by round ====
Round	1	2	3	4	5	6	7	8	9	10	11	12	13	14	15	16	17	18	19	20	21	22	23	24	25	26	27	28	29	30	31	32	33	34	35	36	37	38
Ground	A	H	A	H	A	H	H	A	H	A	H	H	A	H	A	A	A	H	A	H	A	A	H	A	H	A	H	A	H	H	A	H	A	H	A	H	A	H
Result	D	W	D	W	W	W	W	D	W	W	L	W	W	W	L	W	D	W	W	W	W	L	D	D	W	L	W	W	W	L	W	W	W	W	L	W	W	W
Position	10	4	4	2	3	2	2	2	2	2	2	2	2	2	2	2	3	2	2	1	1	1	1	2	2	3	2	2	2	2	2	2	2	2	2	2	2	2

Source: La Liga
A = Away; H = Home; W = Win; D = Draw; L = Loss

==== Matches ====
The league fixtures were announced on 18 June 2024.

18 August 2024 1	Mallorca	1–1	Real Madrid	Palma
21:30 UTC+2	Muriqi 53'	Report	Rodrygo 13'; Mendy (red card) 90+7'	Stadium: Mallorca Son Moix; Attendance: 23,010; Referee: César Soto Grado

25 August 2024 2	Real Madrid	3–0	Valladolid	Madrid
17:00 UTC+2	Valverde 50'; Brahim 88'; Endrick 90+6'	Report		Stadium: Santiago Bernabéu; Attendance: 70,178; Referee: Victor García Verdura

29 August 2024 3	Las Palmas	1–1	Real Madrid	Las Palmas
21:30 UTC+2	Moleiro 5'	Report	Vinícius 69' (pen.)	Stadium: Gran Canaria; Attendance: 31,192; Referee: Mateo Busquets Ferrer

1 September 2024 4	Real Madrid	2–0	Real Betis	Madrid
21:30 UTC+2	Mbappé 67', 75' (pen.)	Report		Stadium: Santiago Bernabéu; Attendance: 73,072; Referee: Javier Alberola Rojas

14 September 2024 5	Real Sociedad	0–2	Real Madrid	San Sebastián
21:00 UTC+2		Report	Vinícius 58' (pen.); Mbappé 75' (pen.)	Stadium: Reale Arena; Attendance: 37,370; Referee: Juan Martínez Munuera

21 September 2024 6	Real Madrid	4–1	Espanyol	Madrid
21:00 UTC+2	Carvajal 58'; Rodrygo 75'; Vinícius 78'; Mbappé 90' (pen.)	Report	Courtois 54' (o.g.)	Stadium: Santiago Bernabéu; Attendance: 72,284; Referee: José Luis Munuera Montero

24 September 2024 7	Real Madrid	3–2	Alavés	Madrid
21:00 UTC+2	Vázquez 1'; Mbappé 40'; Rodrygo 48'	Report	Benavídez 85'; Kike 86'	Stadium: Santiago Bernabéu; Attendance: 67,480; Referee: Alejandro Muñiz Ruiz

29 September 2024 8	Atlético Madrid	1–1	Real Madrid	Madrid
21:00 UTC+2	Correa 90+5'; Llorente (red card) 90+9'	Report	Militão 64'	Stadium: Riyadh Air Metropolitano; Attendance: 70,112; Referee: Mateo Busquets Ferrer
Note: The match was temporarily suspended in the 69th minute after Atlético Madrid supporters threw objects onto the pitch.

5 October 2024 9	Real Madrid	2–0	Villarreal	Madrid
21:00 UTC+2	Valverde 14'; Vinícius 73'	Report		Stadium: Santiago Bernabéu; Attendance: 73,842; Referee: Guillermo Cuadra Fernández

19 October 2024 10	Celta Vigo	1–2	Real Madrid	Vigo
21:00 UTC+2	Swedberg 51'	Report	Mbappé 20'; Vinícius 66'	Stadium: ABANCA Balaídos; Attendance: 24,445; Referee: Alejandro Hernández Hernández

26 October 2024 11	Real Madrid	0–4	Barcelona	Madrid
21:00 UTC+2		Report	Lewandowski 54', 56'; Yamal 73'; Raphinha 84'	Stadium: Santiago Bernabéu; Attendance: 78,192; Referee: José María Sánchez Martínez

9 November 2024 12	Real Madrid	4–0	Osasuna	Madrid
14:00 UTC+1	Vinícius 34', 61', 69'; Bellingham 42'	Report		Stadium: Santiago Bernabéu; Attendance: 72,462; Referee: Mario Melero López

24 November 2024 13	Leganés	0–3	Real Madrid	Leganés
18:30 UTC+1		Report	Mbappé 43'; Valverde 66'; Bellingham 85'	Stadium: Butarque; Attendance: 12,338; Referee: Javier Alberola Rojas

1 December 2024 14	Real Madrid	2–0	Getafe	Madrid
16:15 UTC+1	Bellingham 30' (pen.); Mbappé 38'	Report		Stadium: Santiago Bernabéu; Attendance: 74,341; Referee: Alejandro Hernández Hernández

4 December 2024 15	Athletic Bilbao	2–1	Real Madrid	Bilbao
21:00 UTC+1	Berenguer 53'; Guruzeta 80'	Report	Bellingham 78'	Stadium: San Mamés; Attendance: 51,364; Referee: José María Sánchez Martínez
Note: The match date was pushed forward due to both clubs' involvement in the 2025 Supercopa de España.

7 December 2024 16	Girona	0–3	Real Madrid	Girona
21:00 UTC+1		Report	Bellingham 36'; Güler 55'; Mbappé 62'	Stadium: Montilivi; Attendance: 13,827; Referee: Jesús Gil Manzano

14 December 2024 17	Rayo Vallecano	3–3	Real Madrid	Madrid
21:00 UTC+1	López 4'; Mumin 36'; Palazón 64'	Report	Valverde 39'; Bellingham 45'; Rodrygo 56'	Stadium: Vallecas; Attendance: 14,168; Referee: Juan Martínez Munuera

22 December 2024 18	Real Madrid	4–2	Sevilla	Madrid
16:15 UTC+1	Mbappé 10'; Valverde 20'; Rodrygo 34'; Brahim 53'	Report	Romero 35'; Lukebakio 85'	Stadium: Santiago Bernabéu; Attendance: 75,227; Referee: Isidro Díaz de Mera Escuderos

3 January 2025 19	Valencia	1–2	Real Madrid	Valencia
21:00 UTC+1	Duro 27'	Report	Vinícius (red card) 79'; Modrić 85'; Bellingham 90+6'	Stadium: Mestalla; Attendance: 46,420; Referee: César Soto Grado
Note: The match, originally scheduled for 2 November 2024, was postponed due to the 2024 Spain floods.

19 January 2025 20	Real Madrid	4–1	Las Palmas	Madrid
16:15 UTC+1	Mbappé 18' (pen.), 36'; Brahim 33'; Rodrygo 57'	Report	Silva 1'; Benito (red card) 64'	Stadium: Santiago Bernabéu; Attendance: 74,808; Referee: Alejandro Quintero González

25 January 2025 21	Valladolid	0–3	Real Madrid	Valladolid
21:00 UTC+1	Martín (yellow card) 15' (yellow-red card) 90'	Report	Mbappé 30', 57', 90+1' (pen.)	Stadium: José Zorrilla; Attendance: 26,025; Referee: Mateo Busquets Ferrer

1 February 2025 22	Espanyol	1–0	Real Madrid	Cornellà de Llobregat
21:00 UTC+1	Romero 85'	Report		Stadium: Stage Front Stadium; Attendance: 33,669; Referee: Alejandro Muñiz Ruiz

8 February 2025 23	Real Madrid	1–1	Atlético Madrid	Madrid
21:00 UTC+1	Mbappé 50'	Report	Alvarez 35' (pen.)	Stadium: Santiago Bernabéu; Attendance: 78,082; Referee: César Soto Grado

15 February 2025 24	Osasuna	1–1	Real Madrid	Pamplona
16:15 UTC+1	Budimir 58' (pen.)	Report	Mbappé 15'; Bellingham (red card) 39'	Stadium: El Sadar; Attendance: 22,390; Referee: José Luis Munuera Montero

23 February 2025 25	Real Madrid	2–0	Girona	Madrid
16:15 UTC+1	Modrić 41'; Vinícius 83'	Report		Stadium: Santiago Bernabéu; Attendance: 74,028; Referee: Guillermo Cuadra Fernández

1 March 2025 26	Real Betis	2–1	Real Madrid	Seville
18:30 UTC+1	Cardoso 34'; Isco 54' (pen.)	Report	Brahim 10'	Stadium: Benito Villamarín; Attendance: 55,873; Referee: Alejandro Hernández Hernández

9 March 2025 27	Real Madrid	2–1	Rayo Vallecano	Madrid
16:15 UTC+1	Mbappé 30'; Vinícius 34'	Report	Díaz 45+2'	Stadium: Santiago Bernabéu; Attendance: 74,170; Referee: Francisco José Hernández Maeso

15 March 2025 28	Villarreal	1–2	Real Madrid	Villarreal
18:30 UTC+1	Foyth 7'	Report	Mbappé 17', 23'	Stadium: La Cerámica; Attendance: 20,559; Referee: Jesús Gil Manzano

29 March 2025 29	Real Madrid	3–2	Leganés	Madrid
21:00 UTC+1	Mbappé 32' (pen.), 76'; Bellingham 47'	Report	García 33'; Raba 41'	Stadium: Santiago Bernabéu; Attendance: 73,641; Referee: Pablo González Fuertes

5 April 2025 30	Real Madrid	1–2	Valencia	Madrid
16:15 UTC+2	Vinícius 50'	Report	Diakhaby 15'; Duro 90+5'	Stadium: Santiago Bernabéu; Attendance: 75,382; Referee: Guillermo Cuadra Fernández

13 April 2025 31	Alavés	0–1	Real Madrid	Vitoria-Gasteiz
16:15 UTC+2	Sánchez (red card) 70'	Report	Camavinga 34'; Mbappé (red card) 38'	Stadium: Mendizorrotza; Attendance: 19,438; Referee: César Soto Grado

20 April 2025 32	Real Madrid	1–0	Athletic Bilbao	Madrid
21:00 UTC+2	Valverde 90+3'	Report		Stadium: Santiago Bernabéu; Attendance: 72,535; Referee: Juan Martínez Munuera

23 April 2025 33	Getafe	0–1	Real Madrid	Getafe
21:30 UTC+2		Report	Güler 21'	Stadium: Coliseum; Attendance: 15,184; Referee: José María Sánchez Martínez

4 May 2025 34	Real Madrid	3–2	Celta Vigo	Madrid
14:00 UTC+2	Güler 33'; Mbappé 39', 48'	Report	Rodríguez 69'; Swedberg 76'	Stadium: Santiago Bernabéu; Attendance: 67,661; Referee: Jesús Gil Manzano

11 May 2025 35	Barcelona	4–3	Real Madrid	Barcelona
16:15 UTC+2	García 19'; Yamal 32'; Raphinha 34', 45'	Report	Mbappé 5' (pen.), 14', 70'	Stadium: Estadi Olímpic Lluís Companys; Attendance: 50,319; Referee: Alejandro Hernández Hernández

14 May 2025 36	Real Madrid	2–1	Mallorca	Madrid
21:30 UTC+2	Mbappé 68'; Ramón 90+5'	Report	Valjent 11'	Stadium: Santiago Bernabéu; Attendance: 60,753; Referee: Javier Alberola Rojas

18 May 2025 37	Sevilla	0–2	Real Madrid	Seville
19:00 UTC+2	Badé (red card) 12'; Romero (red card) 48'	Report	Mbappé 75'; Bellingham 87'	Stadium: Ramón Sánchez-Pizjuán; Attendance: 31,633; Referee: Mateo Busquets Ferrer

24 May 2025 38	Real Madrid	2–0	Real Sociedad	Madrid
16:15 UTC+2	Mbappé 38', 83'	Report		Stadium: Santiago Bernabéu; Attendance: 73,186; Referee: Mario Melero López

=== Copa del Rey ===
Madrid entered the tournament in the round of 32, as they had qualified for the 2025 Supercopa de España.

6 January 2025 Round of 32	Minera	0–5	Real Madrid	Cartagena (Note: Minera played the match at the Estadio Cartagonova in Cartagena, as their main stadium Municipal Ángel Celdrán, Llano del Beal, did not meet the broadcasting requirements.)
19:00 UTC+1		Report	Valverde 5'; Camavinga 13'; Güler 28', 88'; Modrić 55'	Stadium: Cartagonova; Attendance: 14,000; Referee: Javier Alberola Rojas

16 January 2025 Round of 16	Real Madrid	5–2 (a.e.t.)	Celta Vigo	Madrid
21:30 UTC+1	Mbappé 37'; Vinícius 48'; Endrick 108', 119'; Valverde 112'	Report	Bamba 83'; Alonso 90+1' (pen.)	Stadium: Santiago Bernabéu; Attendance: 64,764; Referee: José Luis Munuera Montero

5 February 2025 Quarter-finals	Leganés	2–3	Real Madrid	Leganés
21:00 UTC+1	Cruz 39' (pen.), 59'	Report	Modrić 18'; Endrick 25'; G. García 90+3'	Stadium: Butarque; Attendance: 11,709; Referee: Javier Alberola Rojas

26 February 2025 Semi-finals, 1st leg	Real Sociedad	0–1	Real Madrid	San Sebastián
21:30 UTC+1		Report	Endrick 19'	Stadium: Reale Arena; Attendance: 37,373; Referee: José María Sánchez Martínez

1 April 2025 Semi-finals, 2nd leg	Real Madrid	4–4 (a.e.t.) (5–4 agg.)	Real Sociedad	Madrid
21:30 UTC+2	Endrick 30'; Bellingham 82'; Tchouaméni 86'; Rüdiger 115'	Report	Barrenetxea 16'; Alaba 72' (o.g.); Oyarzabal 80', 90+3'	Stadium: Santiago Bernabéu; Attendance: 81,044; Referee: Javier Alberola Rojas

26 April 2025 Final	Barcelona	3–2 (a.e.t.)	Real Madrid	Seville
22:00 UTC+2	Pedri 28'; Torres 84'; Koundé 116'	Report	Mbappé 70'; Tchouaméni 77'; Rüdiger (red card) 120+3'; Vázquez (red card) 120+4'; Bellingham (red card) 120+4'	Stadium: La Cartuja; Attendance: 55,579; Referee: Ricardo de Burgos Bengoetxea

=== Supercopa de España ===
Madrid qualified for the tournament by winning the 2023–24 La Liga.

9 January 2025 Semi-finals	Real Madrid	3–0	Mallorca	Jeddah, Saudi Arabia
22:00 UTC+3	Bellingham 63'; Valjent 90+2' (o.g.); Rodrygo 90+5'	Report		Stadium: King Abdullah Sports City; Attendance: 62,242; Referee: Ricardo de Burgos Bengoetxea

12 January 2025 Final	Real Madrid	2–5	Barcelona	Jeddah, Saudi Arabia
22:00 UTC+3	Mbappé 5'; Rodrygo 60'	Report	Yamal 22'; Lewandowski 36' (pen.); Raphinha 39', 48'; Balde 45+10'; Szczęsny (red card) 56'	Stadium: King Abdullah Sports City; Attendance: 60,000; Referee: Jesús Gil Manzano

=== UEFA Champions League ===
==== League phase ====
The league phase draw was held on 29 August 2024.

Pos	Team	Pld	W	D	L	GF	GA	GD	Pts	Qualification
9	(Italian Football Federation) Atalanta	8	4	3	1	20	6	+14	15	Advance to knockout phase play-offs (seeded)
10	(German Football Association) Borussia Dortmund	8	5	0	3	22	12	+10	15	Advance to knockout phase play-offs (seeded)
11	(Royal Spanish Football Federation) Real Madrid	8	5	0	3	20	12	+8	15 (Note: Tied on points (15), goal difference (+8), goals scored (20), away goals (6) and wins (5). Ranked on away wins: Real Madrid 2, Bayern Munich 1.)	Advance to knockout phase play-offs (seeded)
12	(German Football Association) Bayern Munich	8	5	0	3	20	12	+8	15	Advance to knockout phase play-offs (seeded)
13	(Italian Football Federation) Milan	8	5	0	3	14	11	+3	15	Advance to knockout phase play-offs (seeded)

Source: UEFA
Rules for classification: League phase tiebreakers
Notes:

Overall								Home						Away					
Pld	W	D	L	GF	GA	GD	Pts	W	D	L	GF	GA	GD	W	D	L	GF	GA	GD
8	5	0	3	20	12	+8	15	3	0	1	14	7	+7	2	0	2	6	5	+1

Source: UEFA

Round	1	2	3	4	5	6	7	8
Ground	H	A	H	H	A	A	H	A
Result	W	L	W	L	L	W	W	W
Position	8	17	12	18	24	20	16	11

Source: UEFA
A = Away; H = Home; W = Win; D = Draw; L = Loss

17 September 2024 1	Real Madrid (Spain)	3–1	(Germany) VfB Stuttgart	Madrid, Spain
21:00 UTC+2	Mbappé 46'; Rüdiger 83'; Endrick 90+5'	Report	Undav 68'	Stadium: Santiago Bernabéu; Attendance: 71,288; Referee: Halil Umut Meler (Turkey)

2 October 2024 2	Lille (France)	1–0	(Spain) Real Madrid	Villeneuve-d'Ascq, France
21:00 UTC+2	David 45+3' (pen.)	Report		Stadium: Stade Pierre-Mauroy; Attendance: 48,205; Referee: Maurizio Mariani (Italy)

22 October 2024 3	Real Madrid (Spain)	5–2	(Germany) Borussia Dortmund	Madrid, Spain
21:00 UTC+2	Rüdiger 60'; Vinícius 62', 86', 90+3'; Vázquez 83'	Report	Malen 30'; Gittens 34'	Stadium: Santiago Bernabéu; Attendance: 74,642; Referee: István Kovács (Romania)

5 November 2024 4	Real Madrid (Spain)	1–3	(Italy) Milan	Madrid, Spain
21:00 UTC+1	Vinícius 23' (pen.)	Report	Thiaw 12'; Morata 39'; Reijnders 73'	Stadium: Santiago Bernabéu; Attendance: 75,561; Referee: Slavko Vinčić (Slovenia)

27 November 2024 5	Liverpool (England)	2–0	(Spain) Real Madrid	Liverpool, England
21:00 UTC+1	Mac Allister 52'; Gakpo 77'	Report		Stadium: Anfield; Attendance: 59,546; Referee: François Letexier (France)

10 December 2024 6	Atalanta (Italy)	2–3	(Spain) Real Madrid	Bergamo, Italy
21:00 UTC+1	De Ketelaere 45+2' (pen.); Lookman 65'	Report	Mbappé 10'; Vinícius 56'; Bellingham 59'	Stadium: Stadio Atleti Azzurri d'Italia; Attendance: 22,967; Referee: Szymon Marciniak (Poland)

22 January 2025 7	Real Madrid (Spain)	5–1	(Austria) Red Bull Salzburg	Madrid, Spain
21:00 UTC+1	Rodrygo 23', 34'; Mbappé 48'; Vinícius 55', 77'	Report	Bidstrup 85'	Stadium: Santiago Bernabéu; Attendance: 73,692; Referee: Glenn Nyberg (Sweden)

29 January 2025 8	Brest (France)	0–3	(Spain) Real Madrid	Guingamp, France (Note: Brest played their home matches at the Stade de Roudourou in Guingamp, instead of their regular stadium, the Stade Francis-Le Blé, in Brest, which did not meet UEFA requirements.)
21:00 UTC+1		Report	Rodrygo 27', 78'; Bellingham 56'	Stadium: Stade de Roudourou; Attendance: 15,405; Referee: Espen Eskås (Norway)

==== Knockout phase ====
===== Knockout phase play-offs =====
The knockout phase play-off draw was held on 31 January 2025.

11 February 2025 First leg	Manchester City (England)	2–3	(Spain) Real Madrid	Manchester, England
21:00 UTC+1	Haaland 19', 80' (pen.)	Report	Mbappé 60'; Brahim 86'; Bellingham 90+2'	Stadium: City of Manchester Stadium; Attendance: 52,081; Referee: Clément Turpin (France)

19 February 2025 Second leg	Real Madrid (Spain)	3–1 (6–3 agg.)	(England) Manchester City	Madrid, Spain
21:00 UTC+1	Mbappé 4', 33', 61'	Report	González 90+2'	Stadium: Santiago Bernabéu; Attendance: 77,023; Referee: István Kovács (Romania)

===== Round of 16 =====
The round of 16 draw was held on 21 February 2025.

4 March 2025 First leg	Real Madrid (Spain)	2–1	(Spain) Atlético Madrid	Madrid, Spain
21:00 UTC+1	Rodrygo 4'; Brahim 55'	Report	Alvarez 32'	Stadium: Santiago Bernabéu; Attendance: 77,261; Referee: Clément Turpin (France)

12 March 2025 Second leg	Atlético Madrid (Spain)	1–0 (a.e.t.) (2–2 agg.) (2–4 p)	(Spain) Real Madrid	Madrid, Spain
21:00 UTC+1	Gallagher 1'	Report		Stadium: Riyadh Air Metropolitano; Attendance: 69,304; Referee: Szymon Marciniak (Poland)
	Penalties
	Sørloth (penalty scored); Alvarez (penalty missed); Correa (penalty scored); Llorente (penalty missed)		(penalty scored) Mbappé; (penalty scored) Bellingham; (penalty scored) Valverde; (penalty missed) Vázquez; (penalty scored) Rüdiger

===== Quarter-finals =====
The quarter-finals draw was held on 21 February 2025, after the round of 16 draw.

8 April 2025 First leg	Arsenal (England)	3–0	(Spain) Real Madrid	London, England
20:00 UTC+1	Rice 58', 70'; Merino 75'	Report	Camavinga (yellow card) 69' (yellow-red card) 90+4'	Stadium: Emirates Stadium; Attendance: 60,110; Referee: Irfan Peljto (Bosnia and Herzegovina)

16 April 2025 Second leg	Real Madrid (Spain)	1–2 (1–5 agg.)	(England) Arsenal	Madrid, Spain
21:00 UTC+2	Vinícius 67'	Report	Saka 65'; Martinelli 90+3'	Stadium: Santiago Bernabéu; Attendance: 77,073; Referee: François Letexier (France)

=== UEFA Super Cup ===
Madrid qualified for the tournament by winning the 2023–24 UEFA Champions League.

14 August 2024	Real Madrid (Spain)	2–0	(Italy) Atalanta	Warsaw, Poland
21:00 UTC+2	Valverde 59'; Mbappé 68'	Report		Stadium: PGE Narodowy; Attendance: 56,402; Referee: Sandro Schärer (Switzerland)

=== FIFA Intercontinental Cup ===
Madrid qualified for the tournament by winning the 2023–24 UEFA Champions League.

18 December 2024 Final	Real Madrid (Spain)	3–0	(Mexico) Pachuca	Lusail, Qatar
20:00 UTC+3	Mbappé 37'; Rodrygo 53'; Vinícius 84' (pen.)	Report		Stadium: Lusail Stadium; Attendance: 67,249; Referee: Jesús Valenzuela (Venezuela)

=== FIFA Club World Cup ===
==== Group stage ====
The group stage draw was held on 5 December 2024.

Pos	Team	Pld	W	D	L	GF	GA	GD	Pts	Qualification
1	(Spain) Real Madrid	3	2	1	0	7	2	+5	7	Advance to knockout stage
2	(Saudi Arabia) Al Hilal	3	1	2	0	3	1	+2	5	Advance to knockout stage
3	(Austria) Red Bull Salzburg	3	1	1	1	2	4	−2	4	
4	(Mexico) Pachuca	3	0	0	3	2	7	−5	0	

Source: FIFA
Rules for classification: Group stage tiebreakers

18 June 2025 1	Real Madrid (Spain)	1–1	(Saudi Arabia) Al-Hilal	Miami Gardens, United States
15:00 UTC−4	G. García 34'	Report	Neves 41' (pen.)	Stadium: Hard Rock Stadium; Attendance: 62,415; Referee: Facundo Tello (Argentina)

22 June 2025 2	Real Madrid (Spain)	3–1	(Mexico) Pachuca	Charlotte, United States
15:00 UTC−4	Asencio (red card) 7'; Bellingham 35'; Güler 43'; Valverde 70'	Report	Montiel 80'	Stadium: Bank of America Stadium; Attendance: 70,248; Referee: Ramon Abatti (Brazil)

26 June 2025 3	Red Bull Salzburg (Austria)	0–3	(Spain) Real Madrid	Philadelphia, United States
21:00 UTC−4		Report	Vinícius 40'; Valverde 45+3'; G. García 84'	Stadium: Lincoln Financial Field; Attendance: 64,811; Referee: Dahane Beida (Mauritania)

==== Knockout stage ====
1 July 2025 Round of 16	Real Madrid (Spain)	1–0	(Italy) Juventus	Miami Gardens, United States
15:00 UTC−4	G. García 54'	Report		Stadium: Hard Rock Stadium; Attendance: 62,149; Referee: Szymon Marciniak (Poland)

5 July 2025 Quarter-finals	Real Madrid (Spain)	3–2	(Germany) Borussia Dortmund	East Rutherford, United States
16:00 UTC−4	G. García 10'; F. García 20'; Mbappé 90+4'; Huijsen (red card) 90+5'	Report	Beier 90+3'; Guirassy 90+8' (pen.)	Stadium: MetLife Stadium; Attendance: 76,611; Referee: Ramon Abatti (Brazil)

9 July 2025 Semi-finals	Paris Saint-Germain (France)	4–0	(Spain) Real Madrid	East Rutherford, United States
15:10 UTC−4	Fabián 6', 24'; Dembélé 9'; Ramos 87'	Report		Stadium: MetLife Stadium; Attendance: 77,542; Referee: Szymon Marciniak (Poland)

== Statistics ==
=== Squad statistics ===
No.	Pos	Nat	Player	Total		La Liga		Copa del Rey		Champions League		Other^{1}	
No.	Pos	Nat	Player	Apps	Goals	Apps	Goals	Apps	Goals	Apps	Goals	Apps	Goals
1	GK	(Belgium)	Thibaut Courtois	53	0	30	0	1	0	12	0	10	0
2	DF	(Spain)	Dani Carvajal	12	1	8	1	0	0	2	0	2	0
3	DF	(Brazil)	Éder Militão	18	1	12	1	0	0	4	0	2	0
4	DF	(Austria)	David Alaba	14	0	7	0	2	0	5	0	0	0
5	MF	(England)	Jude Bellingham	58	15	31	9	4	1	13	3	10	2
6	MF	(France)	Eduardo Camavinga	35	2	19	1	4	1	9	0	3	0
7	FW	(Brazil)	Vinícius Júnior	58	22	30	11	6	1	12	8	10	2
8	MF	(Uruguay)	Federico Valverde	65	11	36	6	5	2	14	0	10	3
9	FW	(France)	Kylian Mbappé	59	44	34	31	4	2	14	7	7	4
10	MF	(Croatia)	Luka Modrić	63	4	35	2	5	2	14	0	9	0
11	FW	(Brazil)	Rodrygo	54	14	30	6	5	0	12	5	7	3
12	DF	(England)	Trent Alexander-Arnold	5	0	0	0	0	0	0	0	5	0
13	GK	(Ukraine)	Andriy Lunin	14	0	7	0	5	0	2	0	0	0
14	MF	(France)	Aurélien Tchouaméni	58	2	32	0	5	2	11	0	10	0
15	MF	(Turkey)	Arda Güler	49	6	28	3	6	2	7	0	8	1
16	FW	(Brazil)	Endrick	37	7	22	1	6	5	9	1	0	0
17	DF	(Spain)	Lucas Vázquez	53	2	32	1	5	0	10	1	6	0
18	DF	(Spain)	Jesús Vallejo †	4	0	4	0	0	0	0	0	0	0
19	MF	(Spain)	Dani Ceballos	45	0	23	0	5	0	9	0	8	0
20	DF	(Spain)	Fran García	54	1	31	0	6	0	9	0	8	1
21	FW	(Morocco)	Brahim Díaz	55	6	31	4	6	0	11	2	7	0
22	DF	(Germany)	Antonio Rüdiger	55	3	29	0	4	1	13	2	9	0
23	DF	(France)	Ferland Mendy	31	0	14	0	3	0	11	0	3	0
24	DF	(Spain)	Dean Huijsen	5	0	0	0	0	0	0	0	5	0
26	GK	(Spain)	Fran González	1	0	1	0	0	0	0	0	0	0
30	FW	(Spain)	Gonzalo García	10	5	3	0	1	1	0	0	6	4
31	DF	(Spain)	Jacobo Ramón	6	1	3	1	1	0	1	0	1	0
35	DF	(Spain)	Raúl Asencio	46	0	23	0	6	0	10	0	7	0
36	MF	(Spain)	Chema Andrés	3	0	2	0	1	0	0	0	0	0
39	DF	(Spain)	Lorenzo Aguado	3	0	2	0	1	0	0	0	0	0
42	FW	(Spain)	Daniel Yáñez	1	0	1	0	0	0	0	0	0	0
43	DF	(Spain)	Diego Aguado	1	0	0	0	1	0	0	0	0	0
44	FW	(Spain)	Víctor Muñoz	4	0	2	0	0	0	0	0	2	0

Source: FBREF

^{1} Includes 2024 FIFA Intercontinental Cup, 2025 Supercopa de España, 2024 UEFA Super Cup and 2025 FIFA Club World Cup.
^{†} Player left Madrid during the season.

=== Goals ===
Rank	Player	La Liga	CdR	UCL	Supercopa	Super Cup	FIC	FCWC	Total
1	(France) Kylian Mbappé	31	2	7	1	1	1	1	44
2	(Brazil) Vinícius Júnior	11	1	8	0	0	1	1	22
3	(England) Jude Bellingham	9	1	3	1	0	0	1	15
4	(Brazil) Rodrygo	6	0	5	2	0	1	0	14
5	(Uruguay) Federico Valverde	6	2	0	0	1	0	2	11
6	(Brazil) Endrick	1	5	1	0	0	0	0	7
7	(Morocco) Brahim Díaz	4	0	2	0	0	0	0	6
7	(Turkey) Arda Güler	3	2	0	0	0	0	1	6
9	(Spain) Gonzalo García	0	1	0	0	0	0	4	5
10	(Croatia) Luka Modrić	2	2	0	0	0	0	0	4
11	(Germany) Antonio Rüdiger	0	1	2	0	0	0	0	3
12	(France) Eduardo Camavinga	1	1	0	0	0	0	0	2
12	(France) Aurélien Tchouaméni	0	2	0	0	0	0	0	2
12	(Spain) Lucas Vázquez	1	0	1	0	0	0	0	2
15	(Spain) Dani Carvajal	1	0	0	0	0	0	0	1
15	(Spain) Fran García	0	0	0	0	0	0	1	1
15	(Brazil) Éder Militão	1	0	0	0	0	0	0	1
15	(Spain) Jacobo Ramón	1	0	0	0	0	0	0	1
Own goals		0	0	0	1	0	0	0	1
Total		78	20	29	5	2	3	11	148

Source: FBREF

=== Clean sheets ===
Rank	Player	La Liga	CdR	UCL	Supercopa	Super Cup	FIC	FCWC	Total
1	(Belgium) Thibaut Courtois	11	0	1	1	1	1	2	17
2	(Ukraine) Andriy Lunin	4	2	0	0	0	0	0	6
Total		15	2	1	1	1	1	2	23

Source: FBREF

=== Disciplinary record ===
N	P	Nat.	Name	La Liga			CdR			UCL			Other^{1}			Total			Notes
N	P	Nat.	Name	Yellow card	Second yellow card	Red card	Yellow card	Second yellow card	Red card	Yellow card	Second yellow card	Red card	Yellow card	Second yellow card	Red card	Yellow card	Second yellow card	Red card	Notes
5	MF	(England)	Jude Bellingham	5		1	1		1	3			3			12		2	
7	FW	(Brazil)	Vinícius Júnior	8		1	1			4			3			16		1	
17	DF	(Spain)	Lucas Vázquez	4			1		1	4						9		1	
35	DF	(Spain)	Raúl Asencio	3			2			2			1		1	8		1	
22	DF	(Germany)	Antonio Rüdiger	3					1	3			1			7		1	
9	FW	(France)	Kylian Mbappé	3		1				1			1			5		1	
23	DF	(France)	Ferland Mendy	1		1				1						2		1	
24	DF	(Spain)	Dean Huijsen												1			1	
6	MF	(France)	Eduardo Camavinga	2			1			2	1		2			7	1		
14	MF	(France)	Aurélien Tchouaméni	5			1			3			2			11			
10	MF	(Croatia)	Luka Modrić	6			2			2						10			
8	MF	(Uruguay)	Federico Valverde	4						1						5			
19	MF	(Spain)	Dani Ceballos	4						1						5			
3	DF	(Brazil)	Éder Militão	2						2						4			
16	FW	(Brazil)	Endrick	1			1			2						4			
2	DF	(Spain)	Dani Carvajal	2									1			3			
4	DF	(Austria)	David Alaba	1						1						2			
21	FW	(Morocco)	Brahim Díaz	1						1						2			
31	DF	(Spain)	Jacobo Ramón	1			1									2			
1	GK	(Belgium)	Thibaut Courtois	1												1			
15	MF	(Turkey)	Arda Güler	1												1			

Source: FBREF
Ordered by (red card) , (second yellow card) and (yellow card)
(yellow card) = Number of bookings; (second yellow card) = Number of sending offs after a second yellow card; (red card) = Number of sending offs by a direct red card.
^{1} Includes 2024 FIFA Intercontinental Cup, 2025 Supercopa de España, 2024 UEFA Super Cup and 2025 FIFA Club World Cup.

== Awards ==
=== Monthly awards ===
==== La Liga awards ====
Award	Month	Player(s) / Coach	Ref.
Player of the Month	November	(Brazil) Vinícius Júnior	
Player of the Month	December	(England) Jude Bellingham	
U23 Player of the Month	January	(England) Jude Bellingham	
Player of the Month	January	(France) Kylian Mbappé	

==== Mahou awards ====
Award	Month	Player	Ref.
Player of the Month	August	(Uruguay) Federico Valverde	
Player of the Month	September	(France) Kylian Mbappé	
Player of the Month	October	(Brazil) Vinícius Júnior	
Player of the Month	November	(England) Jude Bellingham	
Player of the Month	December	(France) Kylian Mbappé	
Player of the Month	January	(France) Kylian Mbappé	
Player of the Month	February	(Morocco) Brahim Díaz	
Player of the Month	March	(France) Aurélien Tchouaméni	
Player of the Month	April	(France) Aurélien Tchouaméni	

=== Annual Awards ===
Award	Player(s) / Coach	Ref.
The Best FIFA Men's Player	(Brazil) Vinícius Júnior	
Globe Soccer Best Men's Player of the Year	(Brazil) Vinícius Júnior	
FIFA Intercontinental Cup Adidas Golden Ball	(Brazil) Vinícius Júnior	
FIFA Intercontinental Cup Aramco Player of the Tournament	(Brazil) Vinícius Júnior	
The Best FIFA Men's Coach	(Italy) Carlo Ancelotti	
Men's Johan Cruyff Trophy	(Italy) Carlo Ancelotti	
Globe Soccer Best Coach of the Year	(Italy) Carlo Ancelotti	
European Golden Shoe	(France) Kylian Mbappé	
Mahou Player of the Season	(France) Kylian Mbappé	
The Best FIFA Men's 11	(England) Jude Bellingham (Spain) Dani Carvajal (Germany) Toni Kroos (Germany) Antonio Rüdiger (Brazil) Vinícius Júnior	
FIFPRO Men's World 11	(England) Jude Bellingham (Spain) Dani Carvajal (Germany) Toni Kroos (France) Kylian Mbappé (Germany) Antonio Rüdiger (Brazil) Vinícius Júnior	
La Liga Team of the Season	(England) Jude Bellingham (Belgium) Thibaut Courtois (France) Kylian Mbappé (Germany) Antonio Rüdiger (Uruguay) Federico Valverde (Brazil) Vinícius Júnior	
