= Lorenzo Aguado =

Spanish footballer (born 2002)

Personal information
- Full name: Lorenzo Aguado Herrera
- Date of birth: 19 September 2002 (age 24)
- Place of birth: Madrid, Spain
- Height: 1.77 m (5 ft 10 in)
- Position: Right-back

Team information
- Current team: Albacete
- Number: 2

Youth career
- 2008–2010: Illescas
- 2010–2021: Real Madrid

Senior career*
Years	Team	Apps	(Gls)
2021–2025	Real Madrid B	26	(2)
2021–2022	→ Navalcarnero (loan)	15	(5)
2022–2023	RSC Internacional	26	(10)
2025	Real Madrid	2	(0)
2025–	Albacete	32	(0)
- * Club domestic league appearances and goals as of 9 June 2026

Lorenzo Aguado Herrera (born 19 September 2002) is a Spanish footballer who plays as a right-back for Albacete Balompié.

== Career ==
Born in Madrid, Aguado joined the youth academy of Real Madrid at the age of eight. In 2021, after finishing his formation, he was loaned to Segunda División RFEF side CDA Navalcarnero.

Upon returning in July 2022, Aguado was assigned to affiliate side RSC Internacional FC in Tercera Federación, before being promoted to the reserves in 2023. He made his first team debut on 6 January 2025, starting in a 5–0 Copa del Rey away routing of CD Minera, and made his La Liga debut thirteen days later, in a 4–1 home win over UD Las Palmas.

On 30 July 2025, Aguado signed a three-year contract with Segunda División side Albacete Balompié.

== Career statistics ==
As of match played 18 May 2025

Appearances and goals by club, season and competition
Club	Season	League			Cup		Other		Total	
Club	Season	Division	Apps	Goals	Apps	Goals	Apps	Goals	Apps	Goals
Navalcarnero (loan)	2021–22	Segunda División RFEF	15	5	—		0	0	15	5
RSC Internacional FC (loan)	2022–23	Tercera Federación	26	10	—		4 (Note: Appearances in 2023 Tercera Federación play-offs)	0	30	10
Real Madrid Castilla	2023–24	Primera Federación	13	1	—		—		13	1
Real Madrid Castilla	2024–25	Primera Federación	22	1	—		0	0	7	1
Real Madrid Castilla	Total		25	2	—		0	0	25	2
Real Madrid	2024–25	La Liga	2	0	1	0	0	0	3	0
Career total			78	17	—		5	0	83	17

== Honours ==
Real Madrid

- FIFA Intercontinental Cup: 2024
