= 2022 UEFA Super Cup =

- Match programme cover
| Real Madrid | Eintracht Frankfurt |
| (Spain) | (Germany) |
| 2 | 0 |
- Date: 10 August 2022
- Venue: Olympic Stadium, Helsinki
- Man of the Match: Casemiro (Real Madrid)
- Referee: Michael Oliver (England)
- Attendance: 31,042
- Weather: Cloudy; 18 °C (64 °F); 78% humidity

The 2022 UEFA Super Cup was the 47th edition of the UEFA Super Cup, an annual football match organised by UEFA and contested by the reigning champions of the top two European club competitions, the UEFA Champions League and the UEFA Europa League. The match featured Spanish club Real Madrid, winners of the 2021–22 UEFA Champions League, and German club Eintracht Frankfurt, winners of the 2021–22 UEFA Europa League. It was played at the Olympic Stadium in Helsinki, Finland on 10 August 2022. The match was also a repeat of the 1960 European Cup final between both clubs, which was won 7–3 by Real Madrid. The match was the first European club competition fixture featuring the Semi-Automated Offside Technology (SAOT).

Real Madrid won the match 2–0 for their fifth UEFA Super Cup title, a competition record shared with Barcelona and Milan.

== Teams ==
| Team | Qualification | Previous participations (bold indicates winners) |
|---|---|---|
| (Spain) Real Madrid | Winners of the 2021–22 UEFA Champions League | 7 (1998, 2000, **2002**, **2014**, **2016**, **2017**, 2018) |
| (Germany) Eintracht Frankfurt | Winners of the 2021–22 UEFA Europa League | None |

This was Real Madrid's eighth participation in the UEFA Super Cup, winning it four times previously and finishing as runners-up on three previous occasions. It was Eintracht Frankfurt's first UEFA Super Cup appearance.

== Venue ==
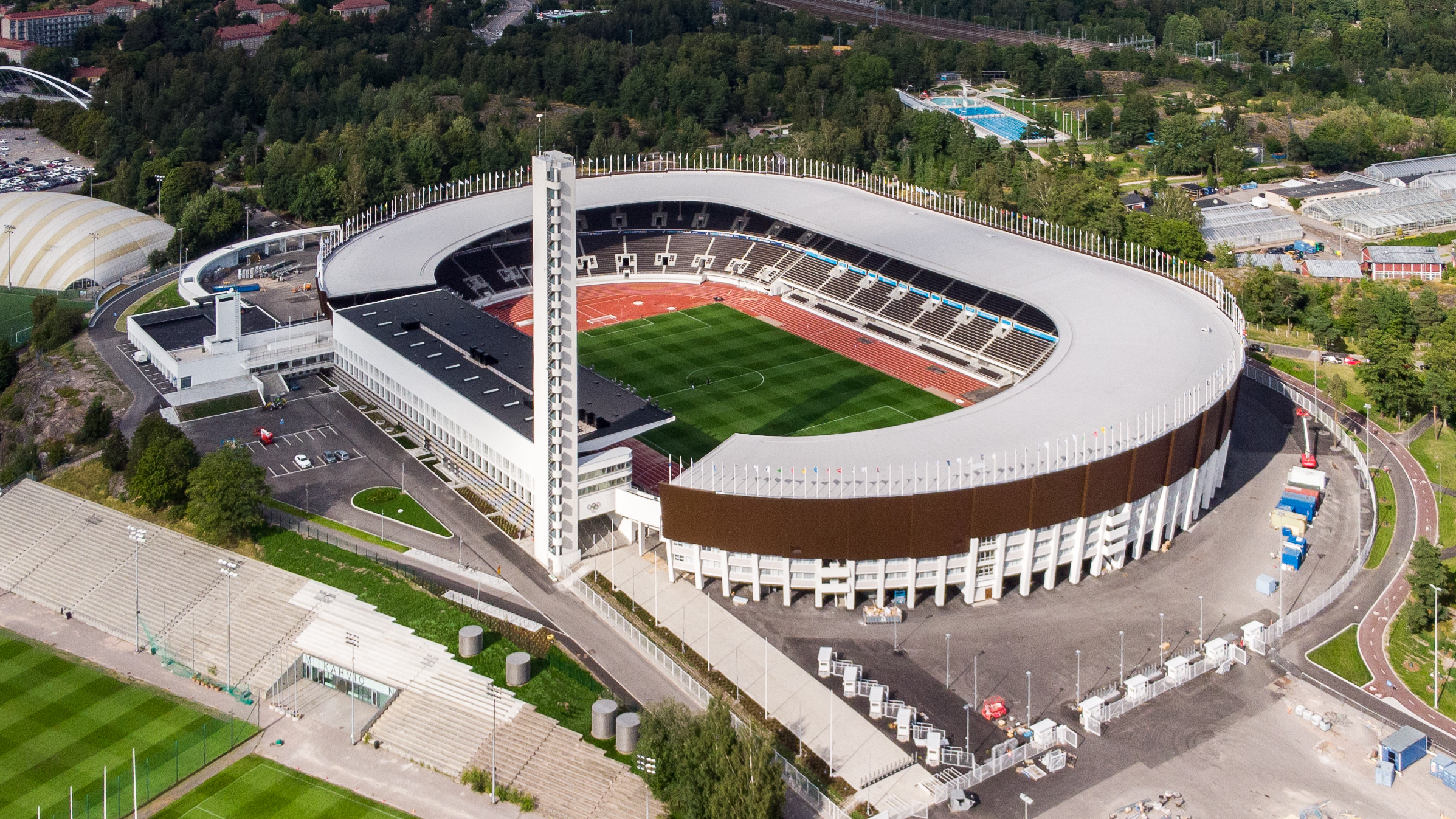
The Olympic Stadium in Helsinki hosted the match.

The Helsinki Olympic Stadium was selected as the final host by the UEFA Executive Committee during their meeting in Amsterdam, Netherlands on 2 March 2020. The Albanian Football Association also had bid for the match to be hosted in Tirana, but withdrew prior to the vote, instead focusing on securing the 2022 UEFA Europa Conference League final.

The match was the first UEFA club competition final to be held in Finland. The stadium was previously used as a venue for the UEFA Women's Euro 2009, where it hosted four group stage matches and the final.

== Pre-match ==
=== Officials ===
On 3 August 2022, UEFA named English official Michael Oliver as the referee for the match. Oliver had been a FIFA referee since 2012, officiated at UEFA Euro 2020 and was the referee for the 2015 FIFA U-17 World Cup final. He was joined by fellow countrymen Stuart Burt and Simon Bennett as assistant referees, while Donatas Rumšas of Lithuania served as the fourth official. Tomasz Kwiatkowski of Poland was selected as the video assistant referee (VAR), with compatriot Bartosz Frankowski and Tiago Martins of Portugal serving as the assistant VAR officials.

== Match ==
=== Summary ===
Eintracht Frankfurt had the first chance in the match in the 14th minute with Thibaut Courtois saving in a one-on-one from Daichi Kamada. In the 36th minute Kevin Trapp got down to his left to save a low shot from Vinícius Júnior. From the resulting corner Real Madrid went in front when Casemiro headed back from the end line on the right to David Alaba who tapped into the net from close range. Trapp made another save in the 55th minute before Casemiro hit the crossbar from the edge of the box two minutes later. In the 65th minute Vinícius played the ball in from the left to Karim Benzema who made it 2–0 with a shot which goalkeeper Kevin Trapp failed to keep out.

=== Details ===
The Champions League winners were designated as the "home" team for administrative purposes.

10 August 2022
22:00 UTC+3

| Real Madrid (Spain) | 2–0 | (Germany) Eintracht Frankfurt |
|---|---|---|
| Alaba 37'; Benzema 65' | Report |

Olympic Stadium, Helsinki
Attendance: 31,042
Referee: Michael Oliver (England)

| **Real Madrid** | **Eintracht Frankfurt** |

| GK | 1 | (Belgium) Thibaut Courtois |
| RB | 2 | (Spain) Dani Carvajal | (substituted off) 85' |
| CB | 3 | (Brazil) Éder Militão |
| CB | 4 | (Austria) David Alaba |
| LB | 23 | (France) Ferland Mendy |
| CM | 10 | (Croatia) Luka Modrić | (substituted off) 67' |
| CM | 14 | (Brazil) Casemiro |
| CM | 8 | (Germany) Toni Kroos | (substituted off) 85' |
| RF | 15 | (Uruguay) Federico Valverde | (substituted off) 76' |
| CF | 9 | (France) Karim Benzema (c) |
| LF | 20 | (Brazil) Vinícius Júnior | (substituted off) 85' |
Substitutes:
| GK | 13 | (Ukraine) Andriy Lunin |
| DF | 5 | (Spain) Jesús Vallejo |
| DF | 6 | (Spain) Nacho |
| DF | 22 | (Germany) Antonio Rüdiger | (substituted on) 85' |
| MF | 17 | (Spain) Lucas Vázquez |
| MF | 18 | (France) Aurélien Tchouaméni | (substituted on) 85' |
| MF | 19 | (Spain) Dani Ceballos | (substituted on) 85' |
| MF | 25 | (France) Eduardo Camavinga | (substituted on) 76' |
| FW | 7 | (Belgium) Eden Hazard |
| FW | 11 | (Spain) Marco Asensio |
| FW | 21 | (Brazil) Rodrygo | (substituted on) 67' |
| FW | 24 | (Dominican Republic) Mariano |
Manager:
(Italy) Carlo Ancelotti

| GK | 1 | (Germany) Kevin Trapp |
| CB | 18 | (Mali) Almamy Touré | | (substituted off) 70' |
| CB | 35 | (Brazil) Tuta |
| CB | 2 | (France) Evan Ndicka |
| RM | 36 | (Germany) Ansgar Knauff |
| CM | 8 | (Switzerland) Djibril Sow |
| CM | 17 | (Germany) Sebastian Rode (c) | | (substituted off) 58' |
| LM | 25 | (Germany) Christopher Lenz |
| RW | 15 | (Japan) Daichi Kamada |
| CF | 19 | (Colombia) Rafael Santos Borré |
| LW | 29 | (Denmark) Jesper Lindstrøm | | (substituted off) 58' |
Substitutes:
| GK | 31 | (Germany) Jens Grahl |
| GK | 40 | (Germany) Diant Ramaj |
| DF | 5 | (Croatia) Hrvoje Smolčić |
| DF | 22 | (United States) Timothy Chandler |
| MF | 6 | (Croatia) Kristijan Jakić |
| MF | 20 | (Japan) Makoto Hasebe |
| MF | 27 | (Germany) Mario Götze | | (substituted on) 58' |
| FW | 9 | (France) Randal Kolo Muani | | (substituted on) 58' |
| FW | 11 | (Germany) Faride Alidou |
| FW | 21 | (Argentina) Lucas Alario | (yellow card) 90+2' | (substituted on) 70' |
| FW | 23 | (Norway) Jens Petter Hauge |
Manager:
(Austria) Oliver Glasner

Man of the Match:
Casemiro (Real Madrid)

Assistant referees:
Stuart Burt (England)
Simon Bennett (England)
Fourth official:
Donatas Rumšas (Lithuania)
Video assistant referee:
Tomasz Kwiatkowski (Poland)
Assistant video assistant referees:
Bartosz Frankowski (Poland)
Tiago Martins (Portugal)

**Match rules**

- 90 minutes
- 30 minutes of extra time if necessary
- Penalty shoot-out if scores still level
- Twelve named substitutes
- Maximum of five substitutions, with a sixth allowed in extra time (Note: Each team was given only three opportunities to make substitutions, with a fourth opportunity in extra time, excluding substitutions made at half-time, before the start of extra time and at half-time in extra time.)

=== Statistics ===
First half
| Statistic | Real Madrid | Eintracht Frankfurt |
|---|---|---|
| Goals scored | 1 | 0 |
| Total shots | 8 | 4 |
| Shots on target | 3 | 2 |
| Saves | 2 | 2 |
| Ball possession | 63% | 37% |
| Corner kicks | 3 | 1 |
| Fouls committed | 3 | 7 |
| Offsides | 1 | 2 |
| Yellow cards | 0 | 0 |
| Red cards | 0 | 0 |

Second half
| Statistic | Real Madrid | Eintracht Frankfurt |
|---|---|---|
| Goals scored | 1 | 0 |
| Total shots | 5 | 2 |
| Shots on target | 3 | 1 |
| Saves | 1 | 2 |
| Ball possession | 52% | 48% |
| Corner kicks | 0 | 0 |
| Fouls committed | 4 | 7 |
| Offsides | 1 | 2 |
| Yellow cards | 0 | 1 |
| Red cards | 0 | 0 |

Overall
| Statistic | Real Madrid | Eintracht Frankfurt |
|---|---|---|
| Goals scored | 2 | 0 |
| Total shots | 13 | 6 |
| Shots on target | 6 | 3 |
| Saves | 3 | 4 |
| Ball possession | 57% | 43% |
| Corner kicks | 3 | 1 |
| Fouls committed | 7 | 14 |
| Offsides | 2 | 4 |
| Yellow cards | 0 | 1 |
| Red cards | 0 | 0 |

== See also ==
- 2022 UEFA Champions League final
- 2022 UEFA Europa League final
- 2022–23 UEFA Champions League
- 2022–23 UEFA Europa League
- 2022–23 Eintracht Frankfurt season
- 2022–23 Real Madrid CF season
- Eintracht Frankfurt in European football
- Real Madrid CF in international football
