= Raúl Asencio (footballer, born 2003) =

Spanish footballer (born 2003)

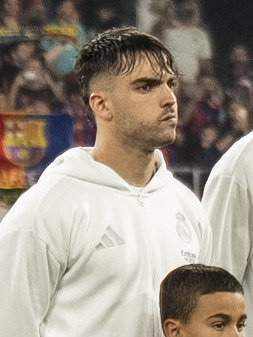
- Asencio with Real Madrid in 2025

Personal information
- Full name: Raúl Asencio del Rosario
- Date of birth: 13 February 2003 (age 23)
- Place of birth: Las Palmas, Spain
- Height: 1.84 m (6 ft 0 in)
- Position: Centre-back

Team information
- Current team: Real Madrid
- Number: 2

Youth career
- 2011–2012: Veteranos del Pilar
- 2012–2017: Las Palmas
- 2017–2022: Real Madrid

Senior career*
| Years | Team | Apps | (Gls) |
| 2022–2023 | RSC Internacional | 29 | (0) |
| 2023–2024 | Real Madrid B | 45 | (0) |
| 2024– | Real Madrid | 46 | (2) |
- * Club domestic league appearances and goals as of 08:44, 24 May 2026 (UTC)

Raúl Asencio del Rosario (born 13 February 2003) is a Spanish professional footballer who plays as a centre-back for La Liga club Real Madrid.

Asencio joined the Real Madrid academy in 2017 from Las Palmas and progressed through the club's youth system before playing for Real Madrid Castilla. He made his first-team debut in 2024 and subsequently established himself as a member of the senior squad, winning the FIFA Intercontinental Cup with the club.

Asencio has represented Spain at youth level.

== Early life ==
Born in Las Palmas in the Canary Islands, Asencio began his youth career at local team Veteranos del Pilar, before joining Las Palmas. At the age of thirteen, he joined the youth academy of La Liga club Real Madrid.

== Club career ==
After a short spell at RSC Internacional, Asencio returned to Real Madrid, and played for their reserves team. There, he was regarded as one of the most important players in the team.

In the 2024–25 season, as Real Madrid were short of center-backs following the injury of David Alaba and Éder Militão, Asencio was brought up to the first team. On 9 November 2024, he made his La Liga debut for Real Madrid, coming on as a substitute in a 4–0 victory against Osasuna. Two weeks later, on 24 November 2024, Asencio made his La Liga debut as a starter for Real Madrid, in a 3–0 victory against Leganés. On 4 January 2026, he netted his first goal for the club in a 5–1 win over Real Betis.

== International career ==
In March 2025, Asencio received his first call up to the Spain national team for the UEFA Nations League quarter-final matches against the Netherlands.

== Style of play ==
Asencio mainly operates as a center-back and has been described as "decisive with the ball and with great physical conditioning".

== Controversies ==
=== Sexual video controversy ===
In September 2023, Asencio and three other Real Madrid Castilla and Real Madrid C players – Ferran Ruiz, Juan Rodríguez and Andrés Garcia – were arrested over allegations that two of the players had filmed and distributed a video of a sexual encounter involving an adult woman and a minor who had not consented to the recording. Asencio was alleged to have accessed the video and to have distributed it to another person. In January 2025, Spanish sports website Relevo reported that Asencio was no longer under investigation in the case. However, in February 2025, an appeal by Asencio's lawyers to end the investigation was rejected by a court in Gran Canaria, and Asencio remains indicted on child pornography charges.

In May 2025, the investigating court of San Bartolomé de Tirajana confirmed that criminal proceedings would advance against Raul Asencio and three of his former Real Madrid reserve teammates (Ferran Ruiz, Juan Rodriguez, and Andrés Garcia), paving the way for a trial. They are accused of recording and subsequently distributing, in June 2023, sexually explicit videos of a 16-year-old minor without her consent. The alleged incident occurred in a nightclub in the Canary Islands. The formal charges include "disclosure of secrets without consent and violation of privacy," "distribution and transmission to third parties of videos without warning or consent of the injured parties," and "use of minors for pornographic purposes and possession of child pornography material." Raul Asencio was later acquitted of these charges in September 2026.

=== Drunk driving conviction ===
In August 2026, Asencio was convicted of a road safety offence after being stopped at a traffic checkpoint in San Bartolomé de Tirajana, Gran Canaria, on 16 August while driving under the influence of alcohol. He recorded alcohol levels of 0.90 and 0.88 mg/l in two breathalyzer tests, exceeding Spain's legal threshold for a criminal offence. Asencio admitted the offence during an expedited trial on 19 August and accepted a sentence of a €14,400 fine and an eight-month driving ban. He also expressed remorse for the incident.

== Career statistics ==
As of match played 23 May 2026

Appearances and goals by club, season and competition
| Club | Season | League | | | Copa del Rey | | Europe | | Other | | Total | |
| Club | Season | Division | Apps | Goals | Apps | Goals | Apps | Goals | Apps | Goals | Apps | Goals |
|---|---|---|---|---|---|---|---|---|---|---|---|---|
| RSC Internacional | 2022–23 | Tercera Federación | 29 | 0 | — | | — | | 4 (Note: Appearances in Tercera Federación play-offs) | 0 | 33 | 0 |
| Real Madrid Castilla | 2023–24 | Primera Federación | 34 | 0 | — | | — | | — | | 34 | 0 |
| Real Madrid Castilla | 2024–25 | Primera Federación | 11 | 0 | — | | — | | — | | 11 | 0 |
| Real Madrid Castilla | Total | | 45 | 0 | — | | — | | — | | 45 | 0 |
| Real Madrid | 2024–25 | La Liga | 23 | 0 | 6 | 0 | 10 (Note: Appearances in UEFA Champions League) | 0 | 7 (Note: Two appearances in Supercopa de España, one appearance in FIFA Intercontinental Cup, four appearances in FIFA Club World Cup) | 0 | 46 | 0 |
| Real Madrid | 2025–26 | La Liga | 23 | 2 | 1 | 0 | 8 | 0 | 2 (Note: Appearances in Supercopa de España) | 0 | 34 | 2 |
| Real Madrid | 2026–27 | La Liga | 0 | 0 | 0 | 0 | 0 | 0 | 0 | 0 | 0 | 0 |
| Real Madrid | Total | | 46 | 2 | 7 | 0 | 18 | 0 | 9 | 0 | 80 | 2 |
| Career total | | | 120 | 2 | 7 | 0 | 18 | 0 | 13 | 0 | 158 | 2 |

== Honours ==
Real Madrid

- FIFA Intercontinental Cup: 2024
