= Ferland Mendy =

French footballer (born 1995)

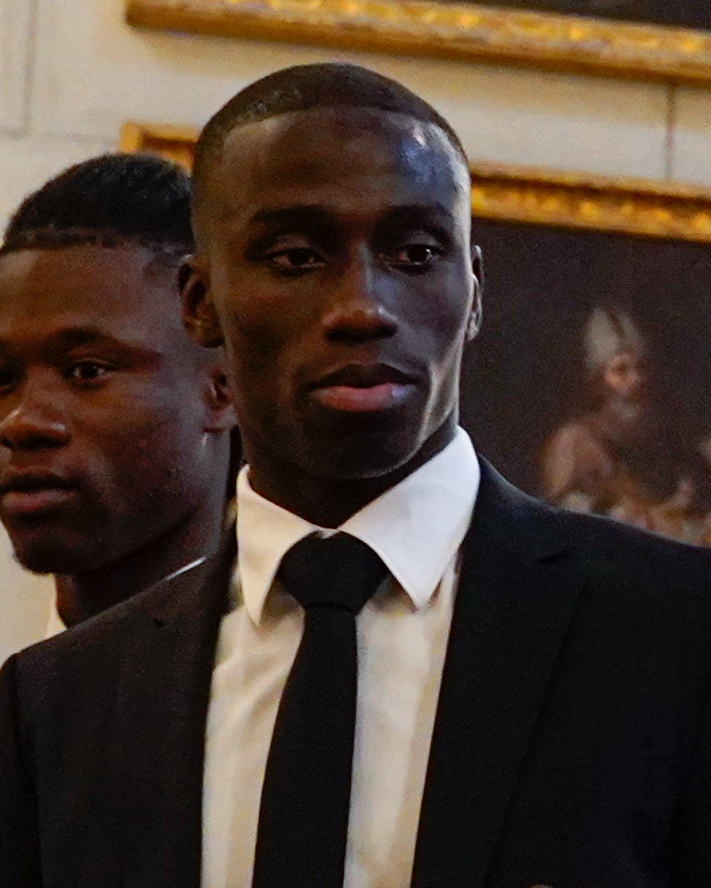
- Mendy in 2022

Personal information
- Full name: Ferland Sinna Mendy
- Date of birth: 8 June 1995 (age 31)
- Place of birth: Meulan-en-Yvelines, France
- Height: 1.80 m (5 ft 11 in)
- Position: Left-back

Team information
- Current team: Real Madrid
- Number: 23

Youth career
- 2002–2004: Ecquevilly EFC
- 2004–2012: Paris Saint-Germain
- 2012–2013: Mantois
- 2013–2015: Le Havre

Senior career*
Years	Team	Apps	(Gls)
2013–2016	Le Havre II	56	(1)
2015–2017	Le Havre	47	(2)
2017–2019	Lyon	57	(2)
2019–	Real Madrid	133	(4)

International career
2018–2024	France	10	(0)
- * Club domestic league appearances and goals as of 17:24, 4 May 2026 (UTC)

Ferland Sinna Mendy (born 8 June 1995) is a French professional footballer who plays as a left-back for La Liga club Real Madrid.

Mendy began his senior career with Le Havre before joining Ligue 1 side Lyon in 2017. He signed for Real Madrid in 2019, where he became a regular left-back and won multiple domestic and European honours, including three La Liga championships and two UEFA Champions Leagues.

Mendy made his senior debut for France in November 2018 and later represented the nation at UEFA Euro 2024.

== Early life ==
Mendy was born in Meulan-en-Yvelines, and grew up in Ecquevilly, in the western suburbs of Paris. He is of Senegalese and Bissau-Guinean descent. He acquired French nationality on 16 January 2007.

== Club career ==
=== Early career ===
During the 2016–17 Ligue 2 season, Mendy made 35 appearances for Le Havre.

=== Lyon ===
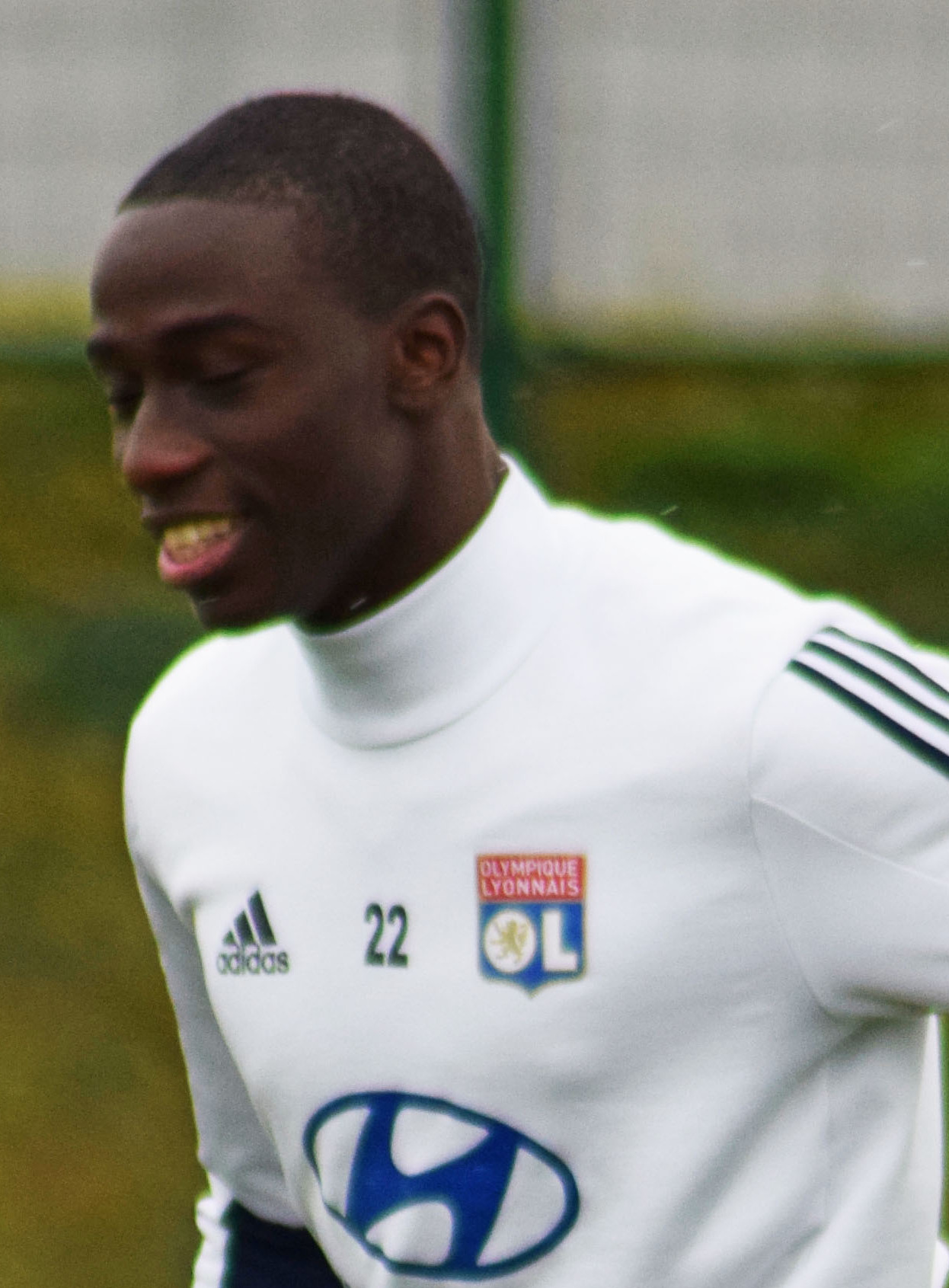
Mendy training with Lyon in 2017

Mendy signed for Ligue 1 club Lyon on 29 June 2017 on a five-year contract. The transfer fee paid to Le Havre was reported as €5 million plus a possible €1 million in bonuses. On 19 September 2018, he made his Champions League debut in a 2–1 away win over Manchester City in the 2018–19 season.

=== Real Madrid ===
On 12 June 2019, Mendy signed for La Liga club Real Madrid on a six-year contract for an initial fee of €48 million, potentially rising to €53 million with add-ons. He made his debut on 1 September 2019, starting in a 2–2 draw at Villarreal. His first goal came on 13 July 2020, in a 2–1 victory over Granada. During the league season he appeared in 25 matches, as Real Madrid won the 2019–20 La Liga.

On 24 February 2021, he scored his first Champions League goal in a 1–0 away win over Atalanta in the 2020–21 season round of 16. In the 2021–22 Champions League semi-final second leg, he made a goal-line clearance to prevent Manchester City's Jack Grealish from scoring in the 87th minute and keep the score at 0–1. However, Real Madrid managed to turn the tie by late goals and extra-time to win 3–1 (6–5 on aggregate) and reach the final.

== International career ==
In November 2018, Mendy was called up for the France national team for the first time after the injury-enforced withdrawal of Benjamin Mendy for the matches against Netherlands and Uruguay. He made his debut against the latter playing all 90 minutes of a 1–0 home win.

On 16 May 2024, Mendy was selected for France to participate in the UEFA Euro 2024. He did not play any matches.

== Personal life ==
Mendy is a cousin of goalkeeper Édouard Mendy, who plays for Saudi Pro League club Al-Ahli and the Senegal national team.

At the age of 15, Mendy spent time in a wheelchair after hip surgery and was told he might never play football again. Mendy is a Muslim.

== Career statistics ==
=== Club ===
As of match played 3 May 2026

Appearances and goals by club, season and competition
Club	Season	League			National cup (Note: Includes Coupe de France, Copa del Rey)		League cup (Note: Includes Coupe de la Ligue)		Europe		Other		Total	
Club	Season	Division	Apps	Goals	Apps	Goals	Apps	Goals	Apps	Goals	Apps	Goals	Apps	Goals
Le Havre II	2013–14	CFA 2	20	0	—		—		—		—		20	0
Le Havre II	2014–15	CFA 2	23	0	—		—		—		—		23	0
Le Havre II	2015–16	CFA 2	13	1	—		—		—		—		13	1
Le Havre II	Total		56	1	—		—		—		—		56	1
Le Havre	2014–15	Ligue 2	1	0	0	0	0	0	—		—		1	0
Le Havre	2015–16	Ligue 2	11	0	1	0	0	0	—		—		12	0
Le Havre	2016–17	Ligue 2	35	2	1	0	2	0	—		—		38	2
Le Havre	Total		47	2	2	0	2	0	—		—		51	2
Lyon	2017–18	Ligue 1	27	0	0	0	1	0	7 (Note: Appearances in UEFA Europa League)	0	—		35	0
Lyon	2018–19	Ligue 1	30	2	4	1	2	0	8 (Note: Appearances in UEFA Champions League)	0	—		44	3
Lyon	Total		57	2	4	1	3	0	15	0	—		79	3
Real Madrid	2019–20	La Liga	25	1	0	0	—		5	0	2 (Note: Appearance(s) in Supercopa de España)	0	32	1
Real Madrid	2020–21	La Liga	26	1	0	0	—		11	1	1	0	38	2
Real Madrid	2021–22	La Liga	22	2	1	0	—		10	0	2	0	35	2
Real Madrid	2022–23	La Liga	18	0	2	0	—		5	0	3 (Note: One appearance in UEFA Super Cup, two appearances in Supercopa de España)	0	28	0
Real Madrid	2023–24	La Liga	23	0	1	0	—		11	0	2	1	37	1
Real Madrid	2024–25	La Liga	14	0	3	0	—		11	0	3	0	31	0
Real Madrid	2025–26	La Liga	5	0	0	0	—		3	0	1	0	9	0
Real Madrid	2026–27	La Liga	0	0	0	0	—		0	0	0	0	0	0
Real Madrid	Total		133	4	7	0	—		56	1	14	1	210	6
Career total			293	9	13	1	5	0	71	1	14	1	396	12

=== International ===
Appearances and goals by national team and year
National team	Year	Apps	Goals
France	2018	1	0
France	2019	3	0
France	2020	3	0
France	2022	2	0
France	2024	1	0
Total		10	0

== Honours ==
Real Madrid

- La Liga: 2019–20, 2021–22, 2023–24
- Copa del Rey: 2022–23
- Supercopa de España: 2020, 2022, 2024
- UEFA Champions League: 2021–22, 2023–24
- UEFA Super Cup: 2022, 2024

Individual

- UNFP Ligue 2 Team of the Year: 2016–17
- UNFP Ligue 1 Team of the Year: 2017–18, 2018–19
