= Aurélien Tchouaméni =

French footballer (born 2000)

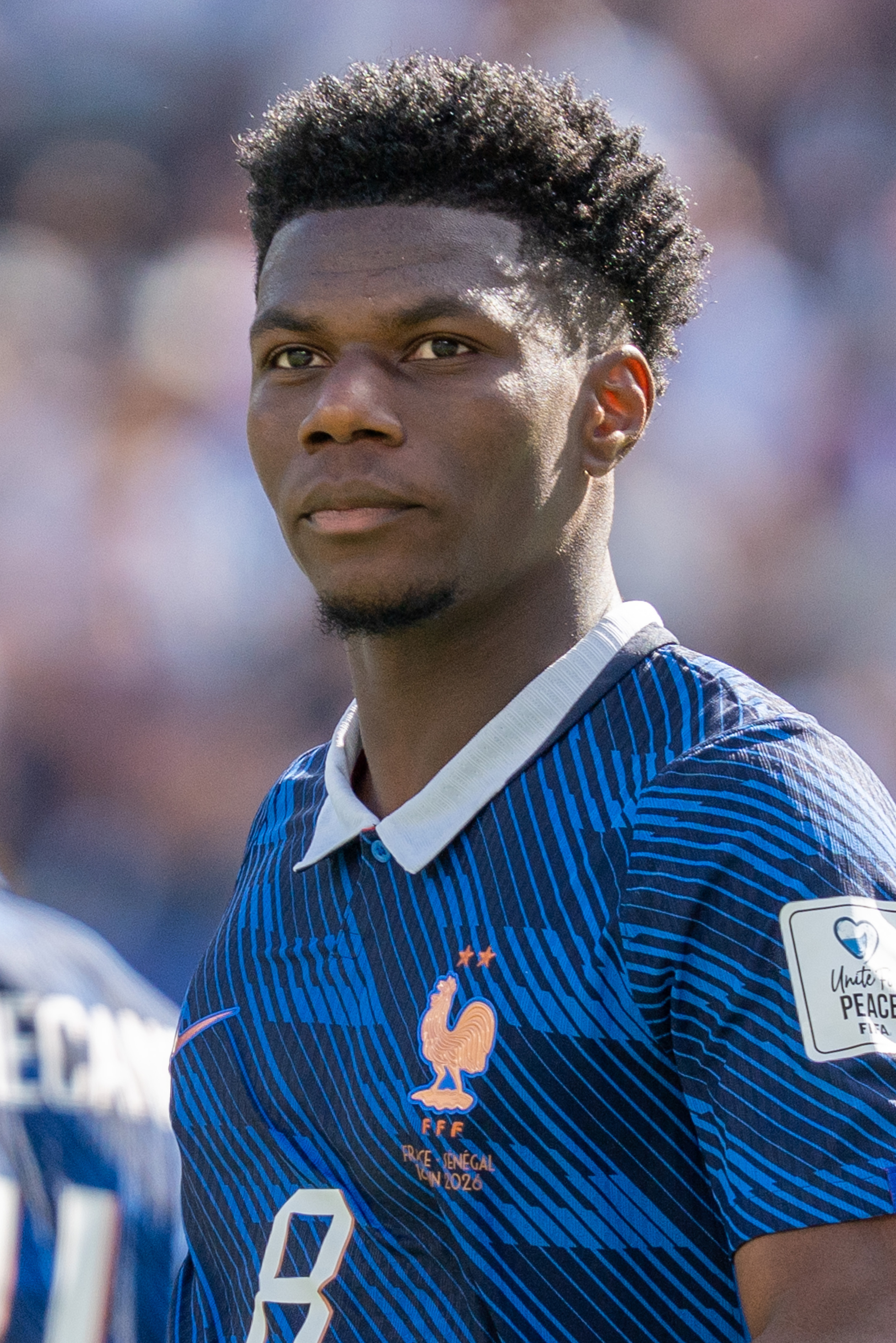
- Tchouaméni with France in 2026

Personal information
- Full name: Aurélien Djani Tchouaméni
- Date of birth: 27 January 2000 (age 26)
- Place of birth: Rouen, Seine-Maritime, France
- Height: 1.87 m (6 ft 2 in)
- Positions: Defensive midfielder; centre-back

Team information
- Current team: Real Madrid
- Number: 14

Youth career
- 2006–2011: SJ D'Artigues
- 2011–2018: Bordeaux

Senior career*
Years	Team	Apps	(Gls)
2017–2018	Bordeaux II	16	(3)
2018–2020	Bordeaux	25	(0)
2020–2022	Monaco	74	(5)
2022–	Real Madrid	133	(4)

International career^{‡}
2015–2016	France U16	11	(0)
2016–2017	France U17	14	(0)
2017–2018	France U18	11	(1)
2018	France U19	7	(0)
2019	France U20	5	(0)
2021	France U21	4	(0)
2021–	France	50	(3)
Medal record
Men's football
Representing France
FIFA World Cup
Runner-up	2022 Qatar
UEFA Nations League
Winner	2021 Italy
Third place	2025 Germany
- * Club domestic league appearances and goals as of 22:01, 7 November 2026 (UTC) ‡ National team caps and goals as of 16:10, 15 July 2026 (UTC)

Aurélien Djani Tchouaméni (French pronunciation: [oʁeljɛ̃ dʒani tʃuameni, tʃwa-]; born 27 January 2000) is a French professional footballer who plays as a defensive midfielder or a centre-back for La Liga club Real Madrid and the France national team.

Tchouaméni began his senior career with Bordeaux before joining Monaco in 2020. He developed into one of the leading midfielders in Ligue 1 before signing for Real Madrid in 2022. With Madrid, he has won several domestic and international honours, including La Liga, the UEFA Champions League, the Copa del Rey and the FIFA Club World Cup.

Tchouaméni made his senior debut for the France national team in 2021. He won the UEFA Nations League in the 2020–21 season and was part of the France side that finished runners-up at the 2022 FIFA World Cup. He also represented France at UEFA Euro 2024 and the 2026 FIFA World Cup, where they finished fourth.

== Early life ==
Aurélien Djani Tchouaméni was born on 27 January 2000 in Rouen, Seine-Maritime, and was raised in Bordeaux, Gironde. He is of Cameroonian descent. He acquired French nationality on 19 December 2000 through the collective effect of his parents' naturalization.

== Club career ==
=== Bordeaux ===
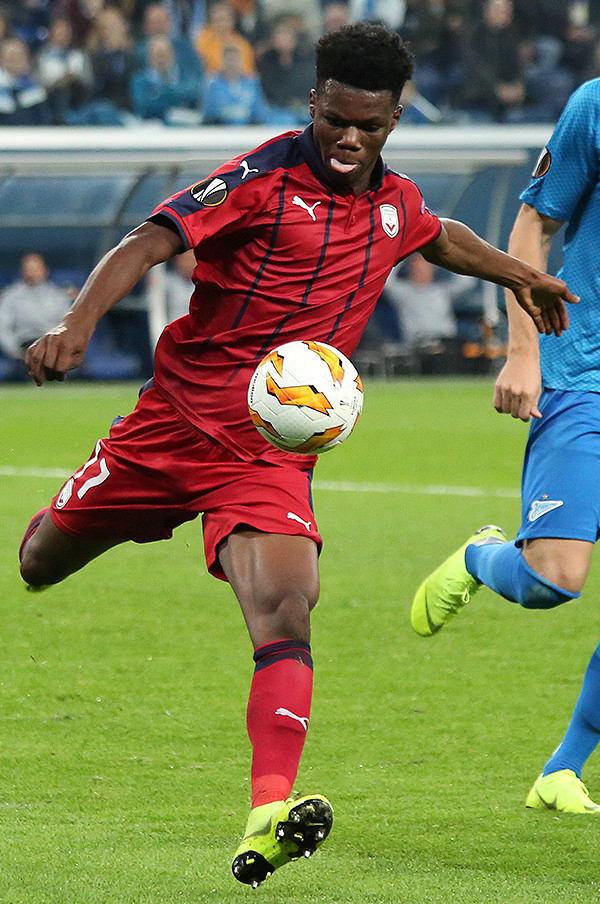
Tchouaméni playing for Bordeaux in 2018

Tchouaméni made his first-team debut for Bordeaux in a 1–0 UEFA Europa League away win against Latvian side Ventspils in the second qualifying round on 26 July 2018, starting the match and playing 89 minutes. He scored his first goal of his senior club career on 9 August, netting the final goal in Bordeaux's 3–1 Europa League away victory over Mariupol.

=== Monaco ===
On 29 January 2020, Tchouaméni signed a four-and-a-half-year deal with Ligue 1 side Monaco. After almost a year playing for the club, he registered his first league goal, netting the second goal in a 3–1 win against Marseille on 23 January 2021. On 14 May 2022, he delivered an assist for his captain Wissam Ben Yedder and, thus, participated in the ninth win in a row for his side.

=== Real Madrid ===
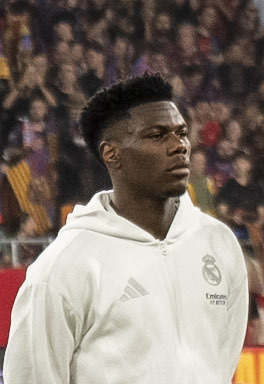
Tchouaméni with Real Madrid in 2025

On 11 June 2022, La Liga club Real Madrid announced that Tchouaméni joined the club, signing a six-year contract with the club. The transfer fee was reported to be €80 million, which could rise to €100 million due to additional fees.

Tchouaméni made his official debut for the club on 10 August, coming on as a late substitute in a 2–0 win over Eintracht Frankfurt in the UEFA Super Cup to win his first career club trophy. On 30 September 2023, he scored his first goal for Los Blancos, a header in a 3–0 league away win over Girona.

On 7 May 2026, Tchouaméni and teammate Federico Valverde got into a fight after a training session. Valverde reportedly needed stitches and was brought to the hospital after getting cut during the altercation. Further on, after striking his head, Valverde experienced partial memory loss and was discovered by his teammates on the ground, drenched in blood and half-conscious. After the altercation, Real Madrid initiated a disciplinary investigation. The process concluded in both players extending mutual apologies to each other. As a result, the club imposed a fine of €500 thousand on each player and formally concluded the internal inquiry.

On 19 November 2026, Tchouaméni extended his contract until 2032.

== International career ==
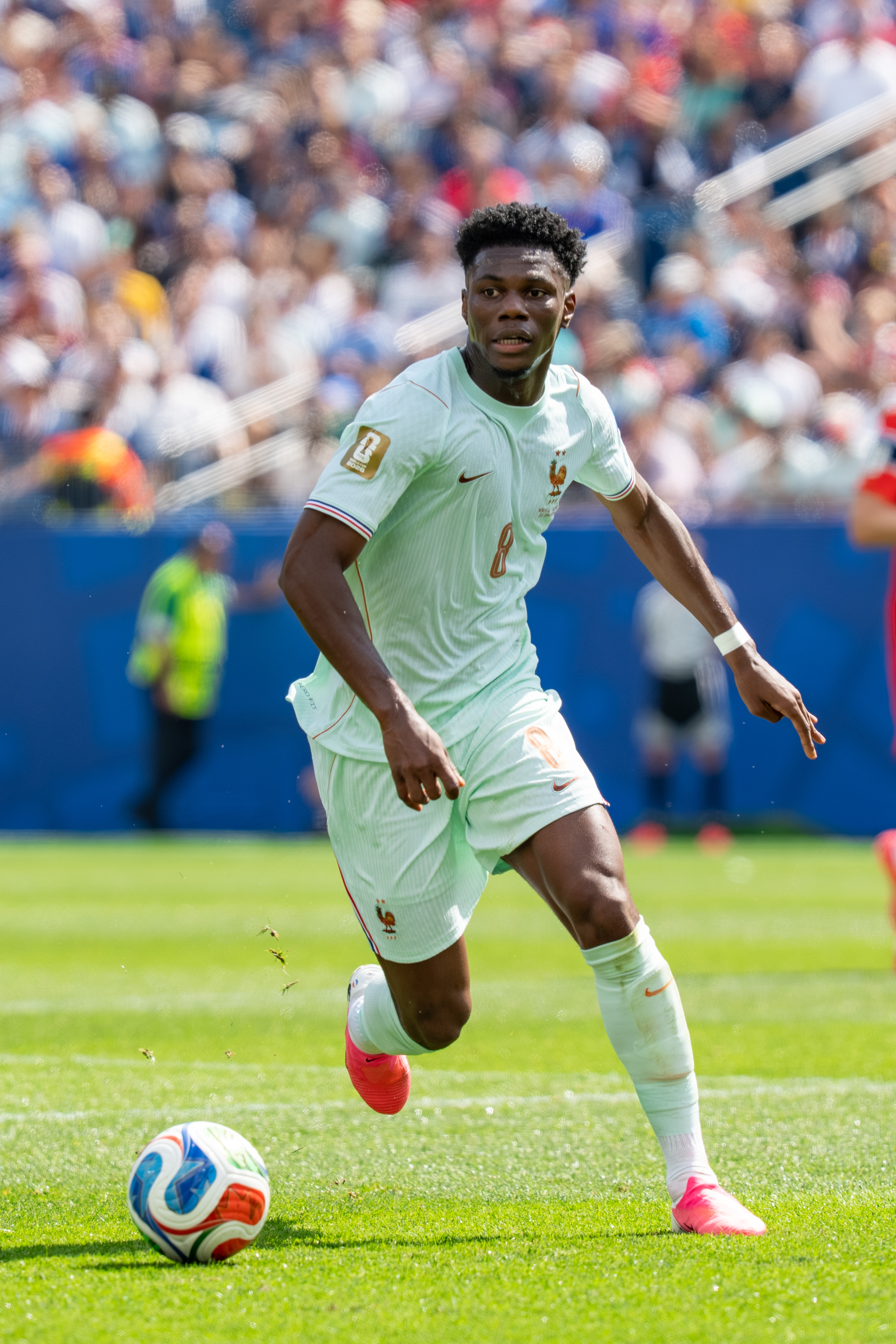
Tchouaméni playing for France at the 2026 FIFA World Cup

On 26 August 2021, Tchouaméni received his first call up to the France senior squad. On 1 September, he made his international debut in a 2022 FIFA World Cup qualifying game against Bosnia and Herzegovina replacing Thomas Lemar in the 46th minute. On 25 March 2022, Tchouaméni scored his first goal for the national team in a friendly against Ivory Coast.

In November 2022, Tchouaméni was named in France's squad for the 2022 FIFA World Cup. On 10 December, he scored his first World Cup goal in a 2–1 victory over England in the quarter-finals.

On 18 December 2022, Tchouaméni started in the 2022 FIFA World Cup Final. He was one of two French players to miss in the penalty shootout as France lost to Argentina at the Lusail Stadium, Qatar.

On 14 May 2026, Tchouaméni was selected in the 26-man squad for the 2026 FIFA World Cup.

== Personal life ==
Tchouaméni is in a relationship with American model Suzette Carter.

== Career statistics ==
=== Club ===
As of match played 7 November 2026

Appearances and goals by club, season and competition
Club	Season	League			National cup (Note: Includes Coupe de France, Copa del Rey)		League cup (Note: Includes Coupe de la Ligue)		Europe		Other		Total	
Club	Season	Division	Apps	Goals	Apps	Goals	Apps	Goals	Apps	Goals	Apps	Goals	Apps	Goals
Bordeaux II	2017–18	National 3	16	3	—		—		—		—		16	3
Bordeaux	2018–19	Ligue 1	10	0	0	0	0	0	9 (Note: Appearances in UEFA Europa League)	1	—		19	1
Bordeaux	2019–20	Ligue 1	15	0	1	0	2	0	—		—		18	0
Bordeaux	Total		25	0	1	0	2	0	9	1	—		37	1
Monaco	2019–20	Ligue 1	3	0	—		—		—		—		3	0
Monaco	2020–21	Ligue 1	36	2	6	1	—		—		—		42	3
Monaco	2021–22	Ligue 1	35	3	4	1	—		11 (Note: Four appearances and one goal in UEFA Champions League, seven appearances in UEFA Europa League)	1	—		50	5
Monaco	Total		74	5	10	2	—		11	1	—		95	8
Real Madrid	2022–23	La Liga	33	0	4	0	—		10 (Note: Appearances in UEFA Champions League)	0	3 (Note: One appearance in UEFA Super Cup, two appearances in FIFA Club World Cup)	0	50	0
Real Madrid	2023–24	La Liga	27	3	1	0	—		8	0	2 (Note: Appearances in Supercopa de España)	0	38	3
Real Madrid	2024–25	La Liga	32	0	5	2	—		11	0	10 (Note: Two appearances in Supercopa de España, one appearance in UEFA Super Cup, one appearance in FIFA Intercontinental Cup, six appearances in FIFA Club World Cup)	0	58	2
Real Madrid	2025–26	La Liga	33	1	1	0	—		13	1	2	0	49	2
Real Madrid	2026–27	La Liga	8	0	0	0	—		2	0	0	0	10	0
Real Madrid	Total		133	4	11	2	—		44	1	17	0	205	7
Career total			248	12	22	4	2	0	64	3	17	0	354	19

=== International ===
As of match played 14 July 2026

Appearances and goals by national team and year
National team	Year	Apps	Goals
France	2021	7	0
France	2022	14	2
France	2023	8	1
France	2024	9	0
France	2025	5	0
France	2026	7	0
Total		50	3

As of match played 14 July 2026
France score listed first, score column indicates score after each Tchouaméni goal

List of international goals scored by Aurélien Tchouaméni
No.	Date	Venue	Cap	Opponent	Score	Result	Competition	Ref.
1	25 March 2022	Stade Vélodrome, Marseille, France	8	Ivory Coast	2–1	2–1	Friendly	
2	10 December 2022	Al Bayt Stadium, Al Khor, Qatar	19	England	1–0	2–1	2022 FIFA World Cup	
3	7 September 2023	Parc des Princes, Paris, France	26	Republic of Ireland	1–0	2–0	UEFA Euro 2024 qualifying	

== Honours ==
Monaco

- Coupe de France runner-up: 2020–21

Real Madrid

- La Liga: 2023–24
- Copa del Rey: 2022–23
- Supercopa de España: 2024
- UEFA Champions League: 2023–24
- UEFA Super Cup: 2022, 2024
- FIFA Club World Cup: 2022
- FIFA Intercontinental Cup: 2024

France

- UEFA Nations League: 2020–21; third place: 2024–25
- FIFA World Cup runner-up: 2022

Individual

- Ligue 1 Young Player of the Year: 2020–21
- Ligue 1 UNFP Team of the Year: 2020–21, 2021–22
- La Liga Team of the Season: 2025–26
