= Federico Valverde =

Uruguayan footballer (born 1998)

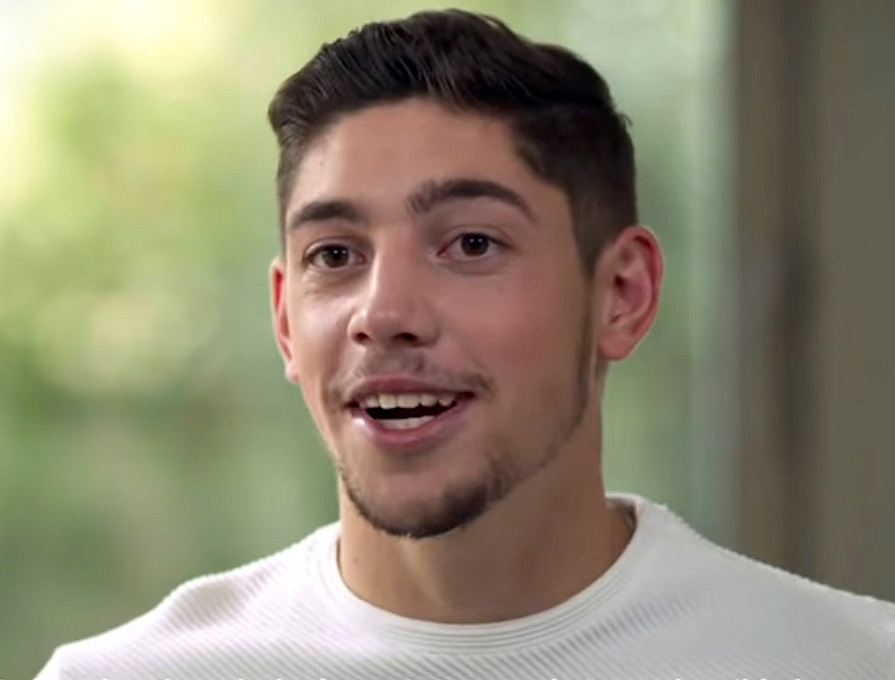
- Valverde in 2021

Personal information
- Full name: Federico Santiago Valverde Dipetta
- Date of birth: 22 July 1998 (age 28)
- Place of birth: Montevideo, Uruguay
- Height: 1.82 m (6 ft 0 in)
- Position: Central midfielder

Team information
- Current team: Real Madrid
- Number: 8

Youth career
- 2001–2008: Estudiantes de la Unión
- 2008–2015: Peñarol

Senior career*
Years	Team	Apps	(Gls)
2015–2016	Peñarol	12	(0)
2016–2017	Real Madrid B	30	(3)
2017–	Real Madrid	256	(26)
2017–2018	→ Deportivo La Coruña (loan)	24	(0)

International career^{‡}
2012–2013	Uruguay U15	25	(7)
2014–2015	Uruguay U17	24	(11)
2015	Uruguay U18	7	(3)
2015–2017	Uruguay U20	15	(2)
2017–	Uruguay	78	(10)
Medal record
Men's football
Representing Uruguay
Copa América
Third place	2024 United States
- * Club domestic league appearances and goals as of 22:08, 21 November 2026 (UTC) ‡ National team caps and goals as of 01:50, 18 November 2026 (UTC)

Federico Santiago Valverde Dipetta (Spanish pronunciation: [feðeˈɾiko βalˈβeɾðe]; (Note: In isolation, Valverde is pronounced [balˈβeɾðe].) born 22 July 1998) is a Uruguayan professional footballer who plays as a central midfielder for La Liga club Real Madrid, which he captains, and the Uruguay national team. Considered one of the best midfielders in the world, he is known for his versatility, work rate, pace and vigorous shooting. Valverde mainly plays as a central midfielder but can also be deployed as a right-back.

Valverde began his professional career with Peñarol in 2015, winning the Uruguayan Primera División in his first season. In 2016, he joined Real Madrid, initially playing for the club's reserve team. He made his first-team debut in 2017 and has since gone on to make over 300 appearances for the club, winning three La Liga titles, two FIFA Club World Cups, two UEFA Champions League titles, two UEFA Super Cups, and the Copa del Rey.

A former youth international across various levels, Valverde made his senior international debut for Uruguay in 2017, and has since represented his country at three Copa América tournaments (2019, 2021 and 2024) and two FIFA World Cups (2022 and 2026).

== Early life ==
Valverde was born on 22 July 1998 in Unión, a neighbourhood in the capital city of Montevideo, to Julio Valverde and Doris Dipetta. He has one older brother, Diego, and two step-brothers, Pablo and Matías Castro. Valverde is of Spanish and Italian descent and became a naturalised Spanish citizen in 2020 after receiving his Spanish passport. Valverde started his youth career with his local neighbourhood club, Estudiantes de la Unión. He then tried out for Peñarol a few years later and was scouted by Néstor Gonçalves.

== Club career ==
=== Peñarol ===
Valverde spent most of his youth career with Peñarol, where he quickly made an impression. He made his club debut on 23 July, one day after his 17th birthday, in an international friendly against Cruzeiro which they won 3–1. He later made his senior debut for the club on 16 August 2015 in their first fixture of the 2015–16 season against Cerro, during which he was guided and mentored by his childhood idol and teammate, Diego Forlán.

He became part of the Uruguayan national youth teams and attracted the interest of European clubs, including Arsenal, Barcelona, Chelsea and Real Madrid.

=== Real Madrid ===
In July 2016, Valverde was transferred from Peñarol to Real Madrid, initially being assigned to their reserve team Castilla. Two months later, he made his debut for Castilla against Real Unión, in a game which his team eventually lost. He became a regular member of the Castilla line-up his debut season, and scored his first goal against Albacete in December 2016.

In regards to his growing importance to the team, Santiago Solari, his coach at Castilla, said on 29 January 2017, "I'm very happy with him. He has adapted very well to the club and country. Valverde always generates a lot of football in midfield."

==== Loan to Deportivo La Coruña ====
On 22 June 2017, Valverde was loaned to La Liga side Deportivo de La Coruña for one year. He made his debut in the competition on 10 September, replacing Fede Cartabia in a 2–4 home loss against Real Sociedad. Valverde contributed with 24 league appearances during the campaign, as the side suffered relegation.

==== 2018: Return to Real Madrid ====
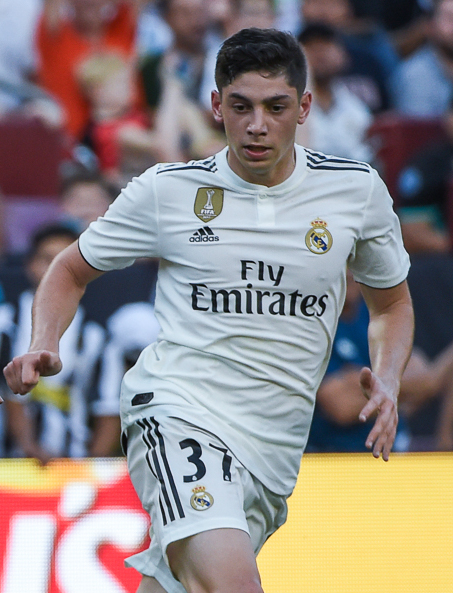
Valverde with Real Madrid in 2018

Upon returning from loan, Valverde impressed new manager Julen Lopetegui during the 2018–19 pre-season and was definitively assigned to the first team. On 23 October 2018, Valverde made his official Real Madrid debut in the UEFA Champions League Group stage against Viktoria Plzeň at the Bernabéu at just 20 years old. He made 25 appearances and won the FIFA Club World Cup in his first season with the first team.

==== 2019–2021: First team breakthrough ====
With the return of Zinedine Zidane to the dugout and the departure of Marcos Llorente, Valverde broke through to become a key squad player during the 2019–20 season. On 9 November 2019, he scored his first goal for Real Madrid, in a 4–0 away win over Eibar in La Liga.

On 12 January 2020, Valverde tackled Álvaro Morata during the Supercopa de España Final against Atlético Madrid, committing a professional foul and stopping play with Morata clean through on goal. Valverde was sent off, but his actions stopped what was a likely goal, forced a penalty shootout which Real Madrid won, and earned him the Man of The Match award and widespread praise. Atlético Madrid manager Diego Simeone later referred to the tackle as "the most important play of the game". He made 33 appearances during the league season, as Real Madrid won the 2019–20 La Liga.

On 27 September, Valverde scored Real Madrid's first goal of the 2020–21 season away against Betis in La Liga in an eventual 3–2 win and was selected as the 'King of The Match'. This was also his 50th La Liga match for Los Blancos. On 24 October, Valverde scored against Barcelona at the Camp Nou in just five minutes in an eventual 3–1 league win. He became just the second Uruguayan to score in El Clásico (after Luis Suárez) and the first for Real Madrid. One week later, Valverde scored again, against Huesca, in a 4–1 league win at the Alfredo Di Stéfano Stadium. This was his third goal of the season, meaning he had already scored more than in the entirety of the previous campaign.

==== 2021–present: Contract extensions, Champions League victories and captaincy ====
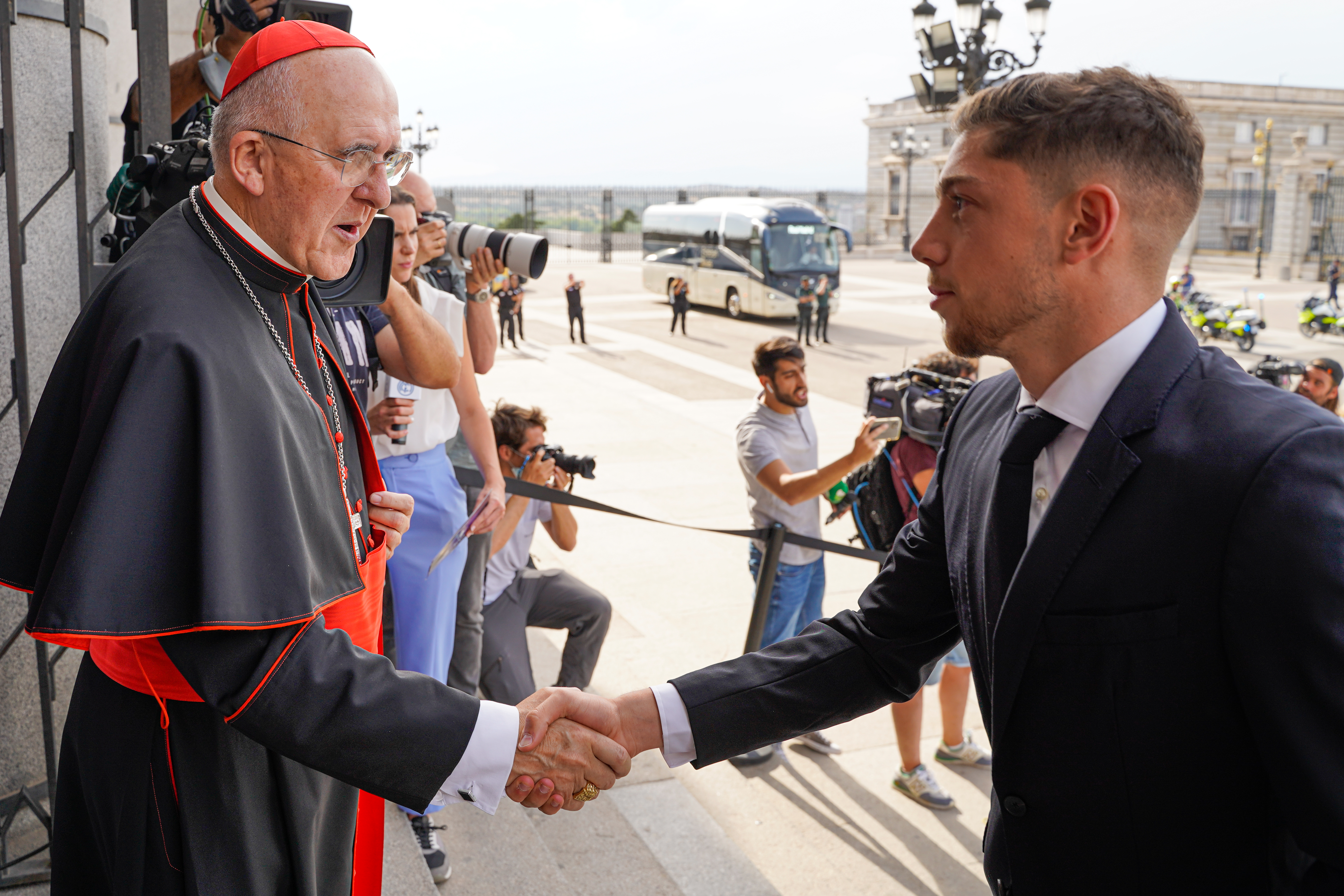
Valverde in a trophy presentation ceremony at Virgin of Almudena in 2022

On 24 August 2021, Valverde extended his contract until 2027. On 12 January 2022, he scored Real Madrid's third goal in a 3–2 win over Barcelona in extra time of the Supercopa de España semi-final, a tournament which Madrid eventually went on to win. On 28 May, he assisted Vinícius Júnior to score the winning goal in a 1–0 win over Liverpool in the 2022 UEFA Champions League Final to clinch a record 14th UEFA Champions League title for Real Madrid.

On 14 September 2022, he scored his first Champions League goal in a 2–0 victory over RB Leipzig. In the 2022–23 season, he netted 12 goals in all competitions, fulfilling his coach Carlo Ancelotti's pre-season prediction that he would score more than 10 goals. On 9 November 2023, Valverde extended his contract with Real Madrid until 30 June 2029.

On 9 April 2024, he scored a first-time volley in a 3–3 draw against Manchester City in the Champions League quarter-finals, which eventually earned him the honour of Goal of the Season. Following the victory in the Champions League final, it was announced that he would be allocated the number 8 shirt after Toni Kroos following his retirement.

In the 2025–26 season, with the departures of Luka Modrić and Lucas Vázquez, Valverde was promoted as vice-captain of the team. On 11 March 2026, he scored the first hat-trick of his career in a 3–0 win over Manchester City in the first leg of the Champions League round of 16.

On 7 May 2026, a fight broke out between Valverde and his teammate Aurélien Tchouaméni, which required him to get stitches and taken to hospital after sustaining a cut during the scrap. It was reported that his teammates found Valverde lying on the ground, covered in blood and semi-conscious, and that he suffered partial memory loss after hitting his head. Following the altercation, Real Madrid launched a disciplinary investigation. The proceedings concluded with both players issuing mutual apologies to one another. Consequently, the club imposed a fine of €500,000 on each player and officially closed the internal inquiry.

At the start of 2026–27 season, Valverde became captain of the team following the departure of Dani Carvajal.

== International career ==
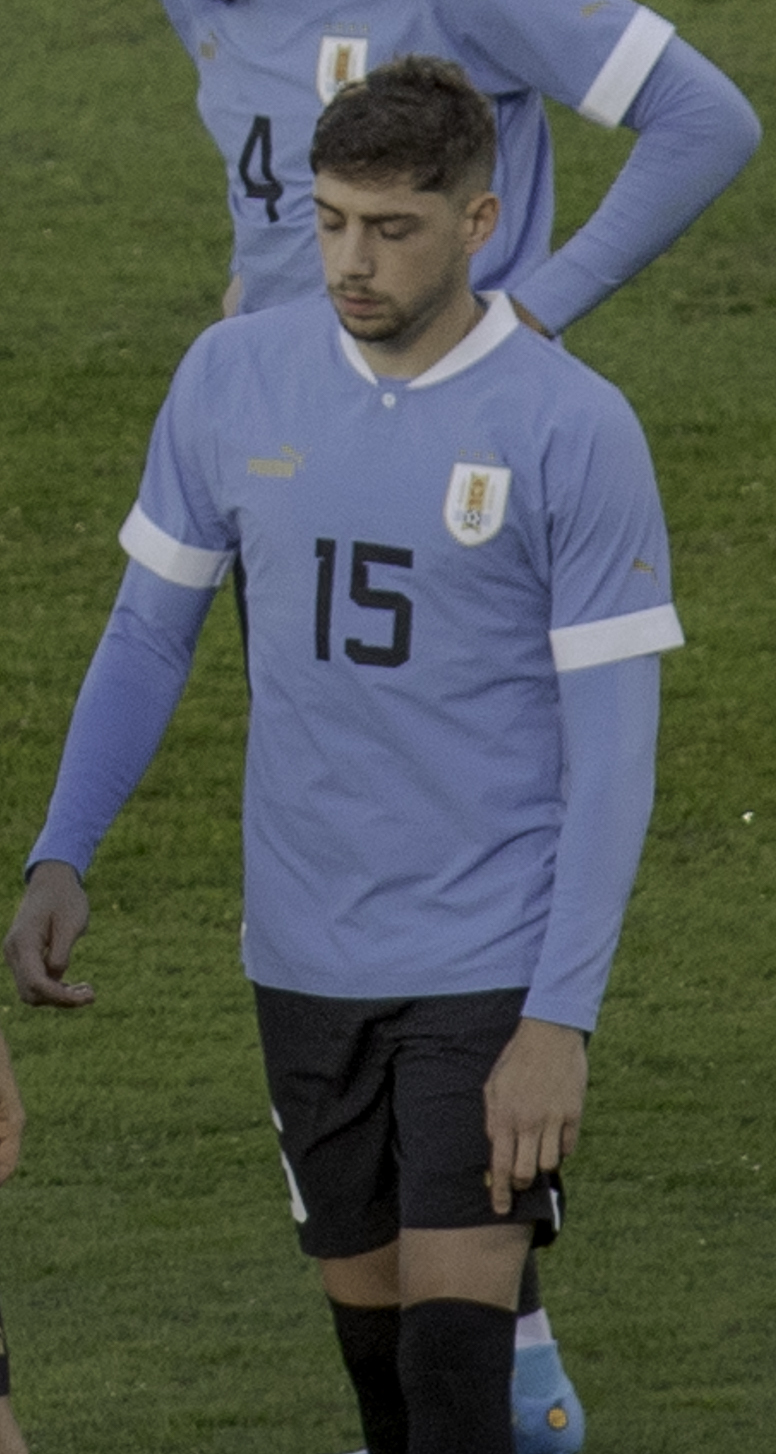
Valverde with Uruguay in 2022

=== Youth ===
Valverde was awarded the Silver Ball at the 2017 FIFA U-20 World Cup as Uruguay finished fourth in the tournament.

In 2017, Valverde was caught up in a controversial gesture after making a "slant eyes" celebration after scoring in the Under-20 World Cup. Valverde denied that the celebration was racist but stated that it was in homage to his first agent, Edgardo "El Chino" Lasalvia. FIFA called on Uruguay to explain Valverde's actions, as well as a celebratory photo of the squad in which several Celeste players made the same gestures.

=== Senior ===
Valverde was first called up to the Uruguay senior squad in August 2017. The same year on 5 September, he marked his debut with his first goal against Paraguay. Valverde was named in Uruguay's provisional 26-man pool for the 2018 FIFA World Cup, but left out of the final 23-man squad.

Valverde was included by manager Óscar Tabárez in the final 23-man Uruguay squad for the 2019 Copa América in Brazil. In the quarter-finals against Peru on 29 June, a goalless draw after regulation time had the match go to a penalty shoot-out, Uruguay lost 4–5 and was eliminated from the competition. He was also included in the final 23-man squad for the 2021 Copa América and 2022 FIFA World Cup.

In June 2024, Valverde was named in Uruguay's squad for the 2024 Copa América. In the team's second group match against Bolivia, he scored a goal in Uruguay's 5–0 win. Uruguay reached the semi-finals of the tournament, losing 1–0 to a ten-man Colombia; in the third-place play-off match against Canada, Uruguay won 4–3 on penalties after a 2–2 draw following extra-time to capture the bronze medal, with Valverde netting his team's first spot kick.

On 31 May 2026, Valverde was named in Uruguay's 26-man squad for the 2026 FIFA World Cup. Uruguay were eliminated in the first round of the tournament following a 1–0 defeat to Spain in their final group match, finishing with only two points following draws against Saudi Arabia and Cape Verde.

== Personal life ==
Valverde's previous nickname was Pajarito (baby bird), but now refers to himself as Halcón (falcon), alluding to his growth as a professional footballer. "Everyone joined the Halcón thing, and I liked it, it was very funny to me. There were people who got angry because they wanted to keep calling me Pajarito, but I'm the Halcón now," said Valverde in an interview.

Valverde is in a relationship with Argentinian journalist and presenter Mina Bonino. They have two sons, Benicio, born in 2020, and Bautista, born in 2023.

Valverde allegedly punched then-Villarreal player Álex Baena in the Santiago Bernabéu car park following a 3–2 defeat in a La Liga match on 8 April 2023. The incident was alleged to have been caused by a comment Baena made to Valverde about Bonino's miscarriage scare. On 3 July, the case against Valverde was dismissed as a magistrates' court found no evidence of criminality.

== Career statistics ==
=== Club ===
As of match played 21 November 2026

Appearances and goals by club, season and competition
Club	Season	League			National cup (Note: Includes Copa del Rey)		Continental		Other		Total	
Club	Season	Division	Apps	Goals	Apps	Goals	Apps	Goals	Apps	Goals	Apps	Goals
Peñarol	2016	Uruguayan Primera División	12	0	—		1 (Note: Appearance in Copa Libertadores)	0	—		13	0
Real Madrid Castilla	2016–17	Segunda División B	30	3	—		—		—		30	3
Deportivo La Coruña (loan)	2017–18	La Liga	24	0	1	0	—		—		25	0
Real Madrid	2018–19	La Liga	16	0	5	0	4 (Note: Appearances in UEFA Champions League)	0	0	0	25	0
Real Madrid	2019–20	La Liga	33	2	3	0	6	0	2 (Note: Appearance(s) in Supercopa de España)	0	44	2
Real Madrid	2020–21	La Liga	24	3	1	0	7	0	1	0	33	3
Real Madrid	2021–22	La Liga	31	0	2	0	11	0	2	1	46	1
Real Madrid	2022–23	La Liga	34	7	6	0	11	2	5 (Note: One appearance in UEFA Super Cup, two appearances in Supercopa de España, two appearances and three goals in FIFA Club World Cup)	3	56	12
Real Madrid	2023–24	La Liga	37	2	2	0	13	1	2	0	54	3
Real Madrid	2024–25	La Liga	36	6	5	2	14	0	10 (Note: One appearance and one goal in UEFA Super Cup, one appearance in FIFA Intercontinental Cup, two appearances in Supercopa de España, six appearances and two goals in FIFA Club World Cup)	3	65	11
Real Madrid	2025–26	La Liga	33	5	1	0	13	3	2	1	49	9
Real Madrid	2026–27	La Liga	12	1	0	0	4	2	0	0	16	3
Real Madrid	Total		256	26	26	2	83	8	24	8	389	44
Career total			322	29	26	2	84	8	24	8	456	47

=== International ===
As of match played 17 November 2026

Appearances and goals by national team and year
National team	Year	Apps	Goals
Uruguay	2017	4	1
Uruguay	2018	4	0
Uruguay	2019	12	1
Uruguay	2020	2	0
Uruguay	2021	13	1
Uruguay	2022	12	1
Uruguay	2023	8	2
Uruguay	2024	12	2
Uruguay	2025	4	0
Uruguay	2026	7	2
Total		78	10

Scores and results list Uruguay's goal tally first, score column indicates score after each Valverde goal.

List of international goals scored by Federico Valverde
No.	Date	Venue	Opponent	Score	Result	Competition
1	5 September 2017	Estadio Defensores del Chaco, Asunción, Paraguay	Paraguay	1–0	2–1	2018 FIFA World Cup qualification
2	7 June 2019	Estadio Centenario, Montevideo, Uruguay	Panama	3–0	3–0	Friendly
3	5 September 2021	Estadio Campeón del Siglo, Montevideo, Uruguay	Bolivia	2–0	4–2	2022 FIFA World Cup qualification
4	29 March 2022	Estadio San Carlos de Apoquindo, Santiago, Chile	Chile	2–0	2–0	2022 FIFA World Cup qualification
5	24 March 2023	Japan National Stadium, Tokyo, Japan	Japan	1–0	1–1	2023 Kirin Challenge Cup
6	8 September 2023	Estadio Centenario, Montevideo, Uruguay	Chile	2–1	3–1	2026 FIFA World Cup qualification
7	27 June 2024	MetLife Stadium, East Rutherford, United States	Bolivia	4–0	5–0	2024 Copa América
8	19 November 2024	Arena Fonte Nova, Salvador, Brazil	Brazil	1–0	1–1	2026 FIFA World Cup qualification
9	27 March 2026	Wembley Stadium, London, England	England	1–1	1–1	Friendly
10	17 November 2026	Estadio Domingo Burgueño, Maldonado, Uruguay	Dominican Republic	4–0	5–0	Friendly

== Honours ==
Peñarol

- Primera División: 2015–16

Real Madrid

- La Liga: 2019–20, 2021–22, 2023–24
- Copa del Rey: 2022–23
- Supercopa de España: 2020, 2022, 2024
- UEFA Champions League: 2021–22, 2023–24
- UEFA Super Cup: 2022, 2024
- FIFA Club World Cup: 2018, 2022
- FIFA Intercontinental Cup: 2024

Uruguay

- Copa América third place: 2024

Individual

- La Liga Team of the Season: 2022–23, 2023–24, 2024–25
- FIFA U-20 World Cup Silver Ball: 2017
- UEFA La Liga Revelation Team of the year: 2019–20
- La Liga Player of the Month: September 2022
- FIFA Club World Cup Silver Ball: 2022
- IFFHS Men's CONMEBOL Team: 2023, 2024
- FIFA Intercontinental Cup Silver Ball: 2024
- The Athletic La Liga Team of the Season: 2024–25
- 2026 FIFA World Cup Superior Player of the Match award: (Saudi Arabia x Uruguay)
