= RSC Internacional FC =

Football club in Spain (1973–2023)

RSC Internacional
- Full name: RSC Internacional Fútbol Club
- Nickname: RSC Inter
- Founded: 1973; 53 years ago
- Dissolved: 2023
- Ground: Ciudad Real Madrid
- Capacity: 1,000
- 2022–23: Tercera Federación – Group 7, 2nd of 16
Home colours	Away colours

RSC Internacional Fútbol Club, was a Spanish football club based in Madrid, in the autonomous community of Madrid. Founded in 1973, it was the second reserve team of Real Madrid CF for the 2022–23 season.

== History ==
Founded in 1973 as Club Deportivo San Ignacio de Loyola, the club changed name to Club Flat International in 2020. In 2021, after achieving a first-ever promotion to Preferente de Madrid, the club was again renamed, now into RSC Internacional Fútbol Club.

RSC Internacional finished first in their Preferente group, and achieved promotion to Tercera División RFEF. In July 2022, newspaper Marca announced that Real Madrid reached an agreement with the club to make Internacional their C-team for the 2022–23 season. In August, the new structure started having former Spanish international Luis García as manager, but with Internacional acting as an independent team from Real Madrid to avoid legal issues.

RSC Internacional gave away their place in the 2023–24 Tercera Federación to Real Madrid C, after the side went back to an active status.

== Season to season ==
Season	Tier	Division	Place	Copa del Rey
1973–74	7	3ª Reg. P.	14th	
1974–75	8	3ª Reg.	3rd	
1975–76	7	3ª Reg. P.	18th	
1976–77	8	3ª Reg.	11th	
1977–78	9	3ª Reg.	6th	
1978–79	9	3ª Reg.	10th	
1979–80	9	3ª Reg.	8th	
1980–81	9	3ª Reg.	14th	
1981–82	9	3ª Reg.	18th	
1982–83	9	3ª Reg.	14th	
1983–84	9	3ª Reg.	15th	
1984–85	9	3ª Reg.	9th	
1985–86	9	3ª Reg.	14th	
1986–87	8	3ª Reg.	9th	
1987–88	8	3ª Reg.	1st	
1988–89	7	2ª Reg.	2nd	
1989–90	6	1ª Reg.	10th	
1990–91	6	1ª Reg.	11th	
1991–92	6	1ª Reg.	10th	
1992–93	6	1ª Reg.	10th	

Season	Tier	Division	Place	Copa del Rey
1993–94	6	1ª Reg.	15th	
1994–95	7	2ª Reg.	11th	
1995–96	7	2ª Reg.	11th	
1996–97	7	2ª Reg.	13th	
1997–98	7	2ª Reg.	14th	
1998–99	7	2ª Reg.	3rd	
1999–2000	7	2ª Reg.	6th	
2000–01	7	2ª Reg.	1st	
2001–02	6	1ª Reg.	8th	
2002–03	6	1ª Reg.	8th	
2003–04	6	1ª Reg.	12th	
2004–05	6	1ª Reg.	12th	
2005–06	6	1ª Reg.	16th	
2006–07	7	2ª Reg.	4th	
2007–08	7	2ª Reg.	3rd	
2008–09	7	2ª Reg.	6th	
2009–10	7	2ª Afic.	10th	
2010–11	7	2ª Afic.	13th	
2011–12	7	2ª Afic.	13th	
2012–13	7	2ª Afic.	7th	

Season	Tier	Division	Place	Copa del Rey
2013–14	7	2ª Afic.	11th	
2014–15	7	2ª Afic.	9th	
2015–16	7	2ª Afic.	4th	
2016–17	7	2ª Afic.	3rd	
2017–18	6	1ª Afic.	8th	
2018–19	6	1ª Afic.	14th	
2019–20	6	1ª Afic.	16th	
2020–21	6	1ª Afic.	2nd	
2021–22	6	Pref.	1st	
2022–23	5	3ª Fed.	2nd	

- 1 season in Tercera Federación

== See also ==
- Real Madrid C
