= 2024 FIFA Intercontinental Cup final =

- The Lusail Stadium in Lusail hosted the final.
- Event: 2024 FIFA Intercontinental Cup
Real Madrid	Pachuca
(Spain)	(Mexico)
3	0
- Date: 18 December 2024
- Venue: Lusail Stadium, Lusail
- Man of the Match: Vinícius Júnior (Real Madrid)
- Referee: Jesús Valenzuela (Venezuela)
- Attendance: 67,249
- Weather: Clear; 18 °C (64 °F); 64% humidity

The 2024 FIFA Intercontinental Cup final, also known simply as the 2024 FIFA Intercontinental Cup, was the final match of the 2024 FIFA Intercontinental Cup, an international club football tournament. It was the first final of the FIFA Intercontinental Cup, a FIFA-organised tournament between the club champions from each of the six continental confederations.

The match took place at Lusail Stadium in Lusail, Qatar, on 18 December 2024 between Spanish club Real Madrid, the winners of the 2023–24 UEFA Champions League, and Mexican club Pachuca, the winners of play-offs contested by the other five confederations.

Real Madrid won the match 3–0 to win the inaugural FIFA Intercontinental Cup, which was also its sixth FIFA trophy and ninth club world championship title.

== Teams ==
In the following table, the finals until 2005 were in the FIFA Club World Championship era, and between 2006 and 2023 in the FIFA Club World Cup era.

Team	Confederation	Qualification for tournament	Previous club world championship finals (bold indicates winners)
(Spain) Real Madrid	UEFA	Winners of the 2023–24 UEFA Champions League	IC: 5 (**1960**, 1966, **1998**, 2000, **2002**); FCWC: 5 (**2014**, **2016**, **2017**, **2018**, **2022**)
(Mexico) Pachuca	CONCACAF	Winners of the 2024 CONCACAF Champions Cup	None

Note: On 27 October 2017, FIFA officially recognised all the champions of the Intercontinental Cup as club world champions, in equal status to the FIFA Club World Cup.

- IC: Intercontinental Cup (1960–2004)
- FCWC: FIFA Club World Cup finals (2000, 2005–2023)

== Route to the final ==
As the winners of the 2023–24 UEFA Champions League, Real Madrid qualified directly for the final of the tournament. Pachuca advanced as the winners of the play-off match, known as the FIFA Challenger Cup, played on 14 December 2024.

(Spain) Real Madrid		Team	(Mexico) Pachuca	
Opponent	Result	2024 FIFA Intercontinental Cup	Opponent	Result
Bye		Second round	(Brazil) Botafogo	3–0
Bye		Play-off	(Egypt) Al Ahly	0–0 (a.e.t.), 6–5 (p)

== Match ==
=== Summary ===
In the 37th minute, Kylian Mbappé got the opening goal of the match with a low finish from close range after a run and cut-back from the left by Vinícius Júnior. In the 53rd minute, Rodrygo made it 2-0 with a right foot finish to the right corner of the net from the edge of the penalty area. Real Madrid were awarded a penalty in the 84th minute when Lucas Vázquez was tripped in the area by Oussama Idrissi. Vinícius Júnior scored the penalty with a low shot to the left under goalkeeper Carlos Moreno who got a hand on it but couldn't keep it out.

=== Details ===
18 December 2024
20:00 AST

Real Madrid (Spain)	3–0	(Mexico) Pachuca
Mbappé 37'; Rodrygo 53'; Vinícius 84' (pen.)	Report

Lusail Stadium, Lusail
Attendance: 67,249
Referee: Jesús Valenzuela (Venezuela)

**Real Madrid**	**Pachuca**

GK	1	(Belgium) Thibaut Courtois
RB	17	(Spain) Lucas Vázquez (c)	(substituted off) 88'
CB	14	(France) Aurélien Tchouaméni
CB	22	(Germany) Antonio Rüdiger
LB	20	(Spain) Fran García
CM	8	(Uruguay) Federico Valverde
CM	6	(France) Eduardo Camavinga	(substituted off) 61'
RW	11	(Brazil) Rodrygo	(substituted off) 70'
AM	5	(England) Jude Bellingham	(substituted off) 88'
LW	7	(Brazil) Vinícius Júnior
CF	9	(France) Kylian Mbappé	(substituted off) 61'
Substitutes:
GK	13	(Ukraine) Andriy Lunin
GK	26	(Spain) Fran González
DF	18	(Spain) Jesús Vallejo
DF	29	(Morocco) Yusi
DF	35	(Spain) Raúl Asencio	(substituted on) 88'
DF	39	(Spain) Lorenzo Aguado
MF	10	(Croatia) Luka Modrić	(substituted on) 70'
MF	15	(Turkey) Arda Güler	(substituted on) 88'
MF	19	(Spain) Dani Ceballos	(substituted on) 61'
FW	16	(Brazil) Endrick
FW	21	(Morocco) Brahim Díaz	(substituted on) 61'
Manager:
(Italy) Carlo Ancelotti

GK	25	(Mexico) Carlos Moreno
RB	24	(Mexico) Luis Rodríguez		(substituted off) 75'
CB	2	(Argentina) Sergio Barreto
CB	33	(Ecuador) Andrés Micolta
LB	8	(Mexico) Bryan González
CM	28	(Mexico) Elías Montiel
CM	5	(Mexico) Pedro Pedraza	(yellow card) 51'
RW	6	(Colombia) Nelson Deossa		(substituted off) 88'
AM	26	(Mexico) Alán Bautista		(substituted off) 75'
LW	11	(Morocco) Oussama Idrissi		(substituted off) 88'
CF	23	(Venezuela) Salomón Rondón (c)	(yellow card) 90+3'
Substitutes:
GK	12	(Mexico) David Shrem
GK	31	(Mexico) José Eulogio
DF	3	(Mexico) Alonso Aceves
DF	22	(Argentina) Gustavo Cabral
DF	32	(Mexico) Carlos Sánchez		(substituted on) 75'
DF	35	(Mexico) Jorge Berlanga
MF	10	(Ecuador) Ángel Mena		(substituted on) 75'
MF	14	(Mexico) Alfonso González
MF	30	(Mexico) Sergio Hernández		(substituted on) 88'
MF	40	(Mexico) José Saldívar
FW	7	(Colombia) Faber Gil
FW	9	(Spain) Borja Bastón
FW	18	(Mexico) Alexéi Domínguez		(substituted on) 88'
FW	27	(Mexico) Owen González
FW	29	(Mexico) Sergio Aguayo
Manager:
(Uruguay) Guillermo Almada

Man of the Match:
Vinícius Júnior (Real Madrid)

Assistant referees:
Jorge Urrego (Venezuela)
Tulio Moreno (Venezuela)
Fourth official:
Iván Barton (El Salvador)
Reserve assistant referee:
David Moran (El Salvador)
Video assistant referee:
Juan Soto (Venezuela)
Assistant video assistant referee:
Tatiana Guzmán (Nicaragua)
Support video assistant referee:
Rob Dieperink (Netherlands)

**Match rules**

- 90 minutes
- 30 minutes of extra time if necessary
- Penalty shoot-out if scores still level
- Maximum of fifteen named substitutes
- Maximum of five substitutions, with a sixth allowed in extra time
- Maximum of three substitution opportunities, with a fourth allowed in extra time
- Maximum of one concussion substitution, granting the opposition an additional standalone substitution

=== Statistics ===
Overall
Statistic	Real Madrid	Pachuca
Goals scored	3	0
Total shots	12	10
Shots on target	4	4
Ball possession	65%	35%
Corner kicks	6	5
Fouls committed	14	13
Offsides	1	1
Yellow cards	0	2
Red cards	0	0
