= 2024–25 C.F. Pachuca season =

Pachuca
2024–25 season
- Manager: Guillermo Almada
- Stadium: Estadio Hidalgo
- Liga MX: 16th
- Leagues Cup: Round of 32
- FIFA Intercontinental Cup: Runners-up
- Top goalscorer: League: Salomón Rondón (15); All: Salomón Rondón (17)
- Biggest win: Pachuca 6–2 Necaxa
- Biggest defeat: Mazatlán 3–0 Pachuca
Home colours	Away colours

The 2024–25 season was the 132nd season in C.F. Pachuca's existence and the 27th in the Mexican top flight, the Liga MX; they also competed in the Leagues Cup and the FIFA Intercontinental Cup.

== Transfers ==
=== In ===
Pos.	Player	Transferred from	Fee	Date	Source
MF	(Mexico) Arturo González	(Mexico) Monterrey	Loan	1 July 2024	
MF	(Ecuador) Ángel Mena	(Mexico) Club León	Free	6 July 2024	
MF	(Uruguay) Santiago Homenchenko	(Spain) Real Oviedo	Loan return	11 August 2024	
MF	(Colombia) Faber Gil	(Colombia) Deportivo Pereira	Loan	23 August 2024	
FW	(Mexico) Jesús Brígido	(Mexico) Guadalajara	Undisclosed	2 January 2025	

=== Out ===
Pos.	Player	Transferred to	Fee	Date	Source
DF	(Uruguay) Valentín Rodríguez	(Uruguay) Peñarol	Loan return	12 July 2024	
MF	(Spain) Paulino de la Fuente	(Spain) Real Oviedo	Undisclosed	19 July 2024	
MF	(Uruguay) Santiago Homenchenko	(Spain) CD Mirandés	Loan	13 August 2024	

== Competitions ==
=== Overall record ===
Competition	First match	Last match	Starting round	Final position	Record							
Competition	First match	Last match	Starting round	Final position	Pld	W	D	L	GF	GA	GD	Win %
Liga MX	7 July 2024	9 November 2024	Matchday 1	16th	30	9	7	14	42	47	−5	30.00
Leagues Cup	30 July 2024	8 August 2024	Group stage	Round of 32	3	0	1	2	2	4	−2	0.00
FIFA Intercontinental Cup	11 December 2024	18 December 2024	Second round	Runners-up	3	1	1	1	3	3	+0	33.33
Total					36	10	9	17	47	54	−7	27.78

Last updated: 19 December 2024
Source: Competitions

=== Liga MX ===
==== Torneo Apertura ====
Pos	Team	Pld	W	D	L	GF	GA	GD	Pts
14	Mazatlán	17	2	8	7	10	19	−9	14
15	Puebla	17	4	2	11	17	31	−14	14
16	Pachuca	17	3	4	10	20	29	−9	13
17	Querétaro	17	3	3	11	13	31	−18	12
18	Santos Laguna	17	2	4	11	12	30	−18	10

Source: Liga MX
Rules for classification: 1) Points; 2) Goal difference; 3) Number of goals scored; 4) Head-to-head results between tied teams; 5) Number of goals scored away; 6) Highest relegation coefficient; 7) Fair Play points

==== Results summary ====
Overall								Home						Away					
Pld	W	D	L	GF	GA	GD	Pts	W	D	L	GF	GA	GD	W	D	L	GF	GA	GD
17	3	4	10	20	29	−9	13	2	2	4	13	13	0	1	2	6	7	16	−9

==== Results by round ====
Round	1	2	3	4	5	6	7	8	9	10	11	12	13	14	15	16	17
Ground	H	A	H	A	A	H	A	H	A	H	A	H	A	A	H	A	H
Result	L	D	W	L	L	D	L	D	W	L	L	L	D	L	W	L	L
Position																	

A = Away; H = Home; W = Win; D = Draw; L = Loss

==== Matches ====
7 July 2024 1	Pachuca	0–1	Monterrey	Pachuca
	Deossa (yellow card) 60'; Pedraza (yellow card) 81'; González (yellow card) 90'		Canales 14'; Vegas (yellow card) 67'; Cortizo (yellow card) 76'; Andrada (yellow card) 84'; Meza (yellow card) 90+4'	Stadium: Estadio Hidalgo; Attendance: 18,262; Referee: Ismael Rosario Lopez Penuelas

13 July 2024 2	León	0–0	Pachuca	León
	Medina Silva (yellow card) 13'; Alvarado (yellow card) 47'; Cabral (yellow card) 77'; Barajas (red card) 90+7'		Idrissi (red card) 27'; Cabral (yellow card) 69'; Barreto (yellow card) 69'; Moreno (yellow card) 90+4'	Stadium: Estadio León; Attendance: 13,279; Referee: Salvador Pérez Villalobos

16 July 2024 3	Pachuca	2–0	Atlético San Luis	Pachuca
	Sánchez 33'; Bautista 52'; Moreno (yellow card) 59'; González (yellow card) 90+4'		Sanabria (yellow card) 50'	Stadium: Estadio Hidalgo; Attendance: 10,215; Referee: Víctor Alfonso Cáceres Hernández

21 July 2024 4	Pumas UNAM	2–0	Pachuca	Mexico City
	Ruvalcaba (yellow card) 45+4'; Rivas 45+6', (yellow card) 58'; Monroy (yellow card) 46'; Huerta 51' (pen.), (yellow card) 65'; Duarte (yellow card) 80'		Pedraza (yellow card) 41'; Idrissi (yellow card) 45+4'; Cabral (yellow card) 45+7'; Deossa (yellow card) 54'; González (yellow card) 83'	Stadium: Estadio Olímpico Universitario; Attendance: 20,854; Referee: Vicente Reynoso Arce

23 August 2024 5	Mazatlán	3–0	Pachuca	Mazatlán
				Stadium: Estadio de Mazatlán; Attendance: 9,095; Referee: Marco Antonio Ortiz Nava

31 August 2024 6	Pachuca	1–1	Querétaro	Pachuca
				Stadium: Estadio Hidalgo

13 September 2024 7	Atlas	2–0	Pachuca

17 September 2024 8	Pachuca	2–2	Toluca	Pachuca
				Stadium: Estadio Hidalgo

20 September 2024 9	Puebla	2–3	Pachuca

28 September 2024 10	Pachuca	2–4	Cruz Azul	Pachuca
				Stadium: Estadio Hidalgo

4 October 2024 11	Tijuana	2–1	Pachuca

19 October 2024 12	Pachuca	0–2	Guadalajara	Pachuca
				Stadium: Estadio Hidalgo

22 October 2024 13	Santos Laguna	1–1	Pachuca

26 October 2024 14	Tigres UANL	2–1	Pachuca

2 November 2024 15	Pachuca	6–2	Necaxa	Pachuca
				Stadium: Estadio Hidalgo

6 November 2024 16	América	2–1	Pachuca

9 November 2024 17	Pachuca	0–1	Juárez	Pachuca
				Stadium: Estadio Hidalgo; Referee: Jorge Abraham Camacho Peregrina

=== Leagues Cup ===
Pos	Team	Pld	W	PW	PL	L	GF	GA	GD	Pts	Qualification
1	(Canadian Soccer Association) Toronto FC	2	1	1	0	0	2	1	+1	5	Advance to knockout stage
2	(Mexican Football Federation) Pachuca	2	0	1	0	1	2	3	−1	2	Advance to knockout stage
3	(United States Soccer Federation) New York Red Bulls	2	0	0	2	0	1	1	0	2	

Source: Leagues Cup
Rules for classification: Tiebreakers

30 July 2024 Group stage	Pachuca (Mexico)	1–1 (5–4 p)	(United States) New York Red Bulls	Harrison, United States
20:00 UTC−4				Stadium: Red Bull Arena

4 August 2024 Group stage	Pachuca (Mexico)	1–2	(Canada) Toronto FC	Toronto, Canada
20:00 UTC−4				Stadium: BMO Field

==== Knockout stage ====
8 August 2024 Round of 32	Tigres UANL (Mexico)	1–0	(Mexico) Pachuca	Austin, United States
20:00 UTC−5				Stadium: Q2 Stadium

=== FIFA Intercontinental Cup ===
==== Second round ====
FIFA Derby of the Americas

11 December 2024 Second round	Botafogo (Brazil)	0–3	(Mexico) Pachuca	Doha, Qatar
20:00 UTC+3		Report	Idrissi 50'; Deossa 66'; Rondón 80'	Stadium: Stadium 974; Attendance: 12,257; Referee: Danny Makkelie (Netherlands)

==== Play-off ====
FIFA Challenger Cup

14 December 2024	Pachuca (Mexico)	0–0 (a.e.t.) (6–5 p)	(Egypt) Al Ahly	Doha, Qatar
20:00 AST		Report		Stadium: Stadium 974; Attendance: 38,841; Referee: Alireza Faghani (Australia)
	Penalties
	Rondón (penalty missed); Bastón (penalty missed); Cabral (penalty scored); Idrissi (penalty scored); Deossa (penalty scored); Montiel (penalty scored); Rodríguez (penalty scored); Gil (penalty scored)		(penalty scored) Magdy; (penalty scored) Rabia; (penalty scored) Attia; (penalty missed) Kahraba; (penalty missed) Kamal; (penalty scored) El Solia; (penalty scored) Tau; (penalty missed) Abdelfattah

==== Final ====
18 December 2024	Real Madrid (Spain)	3–0	(Mexico) Pachuca	Lusail, Qatar
20:00 AST	Mbappé 37'; Rodrygo 53'; Vinícius 84' (pen.)	Report		Stadium: Lusail Stadium; Attendance: 67,249; Referee: Jesús Valenzuela (Venezuela)

=== FIFA Club World Cup ===
==== Group stage ====
The group stage draw took place on 5 December 2024.

Pos	Team	Pld	W	D	L	GF	GA	GD	Pts	Qualification
1	(Spain) Real Madrid	3	2	1	0	7	2	+5	7	Advance to knockout stage
2	(Saudi Arabia) Al Hilal	3	1	2	0	3	1	+2	5	Advance to knockout stage
3	(Austria) Red Bull Salzburg	3	1	1	1	2	4	−2	4	
4	(Mexico) Pachuca	3	0	0	3	2	7	−5	0	

Source: FIFA
Rules for classification: Group stage tiebreakers

18 June 2025 1	Pachuca (Mexico)	1–2	(Austria) Red Bull Salzburg	Cincinnati, United States
18:00 EDT	González 56'; Pereira (yellow card) 75'	Report	Gloukh 42'; Onisiwo 76'	Stadium: TQL Stadium; Attendance: 5,282; Referee: Mustapha Ghorbal (Algeria)

22 June 2025 2	Real Madrid (Spain)	3–1	(Mexico) Pachuca	Charlotte, United States
15:00 UTC−4	Asencio (red card) 7'; Bellingham 35'; Güler 43'; Valverde 70'	Report	Palavecino (yellow card) 18'; Montiel 80'	Stadium: Bank of America Stadium; Attendance: 70,248; Referee: Ramon Abatti (Brazil)

26 June 2025 3	Al-Hilal (Saudi Arabia)	2–0	(Mexico) Pachuca	Nashville, United States
20:00 CDT (UTC−5)	S. Al-Dawsari 22'; Lodi (yellow card) 45+4'; Koulibaly (yellow card) 52'; Marcos Leonardo 90+5'	Report	Barreto (yellow card) 17'; Domínguez (yellow card) 45+1'	Stadium: Geodis Park; Attendance: 14,147; Referee: Danny Makkelie (Netherlands)
