= List of FIFA Intercontinental Cup participants =

The FIFA Intercontinental Cup is an international football competition organised by FIFA, the sport's global governing body. It was created in 2024 to maintain the annual and former format of the FIFA Club World Cup (the latter which would be expanded to 32 teams and a 4-year format).

The current competitions is played by the winners of each year's AFC Champions League Elite, CAF Champions League, CONCACAF Champions Cup, Copa Libertadores, OFC Professional League (Note: The 2024 and 2025 editions of the competition featured the winner of the OFC Men's Champions League instead of the OFC Professional League.) and UEFA Champions League.

== Debut of club teams ==
Each successive FIFA Intercontinental Cup has had at least one club team appearing for the first time.

Year	Debuting teams		
Year	Teams	No.	Cum.
2024	(Egypt) Al Ahly, (United Arab Emirates) Al-Ain, (New Zealand) Auckland City, (Brazil) Botafogo, (Mexico) Pachuca, (Spain) Real Madrid	6	6
2025	(Saudi Arabia) Al-Ahli, (Mexico) Cruz Azul, (Brazil) Flamengo, (France) Paris Saint-Germain, (Egypt) Pyramids	5	11
2026	(New Zealand) Auckland FC, (South Africa) Mamelodi Sundowns, (Mexico) Toluca	3	14

== Confederation records ==
=== AFC ===
Performance of AFC clubs
Year	Club	Method of qualification	Performance
2024	(United Arab Emirates) Al-Ain (1/1)	Winners of the 2023–24 AFC Champions League	Second round
2025	(Saudi Arabia) Al-Ahli (1/2)	Winners of the 2024–25 AFC Champions League Elite	Second round
2026	(Saudi Arabia) Al-Ahli (2/2)	Winners of the 2025–26 AFC Champions League Elite	Second round

=== CAF ===
Performance of CAF clubs
Year	Club	Method of qualification	Performance
2024	(Egypt) Al Ahly (1/1)	Winners of the 2023–24 CAF Champions League	Play-off
2025	(Egypt) Pyramids (1/1)	Winners of the 2024–25 CAF Champions League	Play-off
2026	(South Africa) Mamelodi Sundowns (1/1)	Winners of the 2025–26 CAF Champions League	TBD

=== CONCACAF ===
Performance of CONCACAF clubs
Year	Club	Method of qualification	Performance
2024	(Mexico) Pachuca (1/1)	Winners of the 2024 CONCACAF Champions Cup	Runners-up
2025	(Mexico) Cruz Azul (1/1)	Winners of the 2025 CONCACAF Champions Cup	Second round
2026	(Mexico) Toluca (1/1)	Winners of the 2026 CONCACAF Champions Cup	TBD

=== CONMEBOL ===
Performance of CONMEBOL clubs
Year	Club	Method of qualification	Performance
2024	(Brazil) Botafogo (1/1)	Winners of the 2024 Copa Libertadores	Second round
2025	(Brazil) Flamengo (1/1)	Winners of the 2025 Copa Libertadores	Runners-up
2026	TBD	Winners of the 2026 Copa Libertadores	TBD

=== OFC ===
Performance of OFC clubs
Year	Club	Method of qualification	Performance
2024	(New Zealand) Auckland City (1/2)	Winners of the 2024 OFC Men's Champions League	First round
2025	(New Zealand) Auckland City (2/2)	Winners of the 2025 OFC Men's Champions League	First round
2026	(New Zealand) Auckland FC (1/1)	Winners of the 2026 OFC Professional League	First round

=== UEFA ===
Performance of UEFA clubs
Year	Club	Method of qualification	Performance
2024	(Spain) Real Madrid (1/1)	Winners of the 2023–24 UEFA Champions League	Champions
2025	(France) Paris Saint-Germain (1/2)	Winners of the 2024–25 UEFA Champions League	Champions
2026	(France) Paris Saint-Germain (2/2)	Winners of the 2025–26 UEFA Champions League	TBD

== List of participating clubs of the FIFA Intercontinental Cup ==
The following is a list of clubs that have played in or qualified for the FIFA Intercontinental Cup. Editions in bold indicate competitions won. Rows can be adjusted to national league, total number of participations by national league or club and years played.

List of participant clubs
Nation	No.	Clubs	Years
Mexico (3)	1	Pachuca	2024
Mexico (3)	1	Cruz Azul	2025
Mexico (3)	1	Toluca	2026
New Zealand (2)	2	Auckland City	2024, 2025
New Zealand (2)	1	Auckland FC	2026
Brazil (2)	1	Botafogo	2024
Brazil (2)	1	Flamengo	2025
Egypt (2)	1	Al Ahly	2024
Egypt (2)	1	Pyramids	2025
France (1)	2	Paris Saint-Germain	**2025**, 2026
Saudi Arabia (1)	2	Al-Ahli	2025, 2026
Spain (1)	1	Real Madrid	**2024**
United Arab Emirates (1)	1	Al-Ain	2024
South Africa (1)	1	Mamelodi Sundowns	2026
