= List of world champion football clubs =

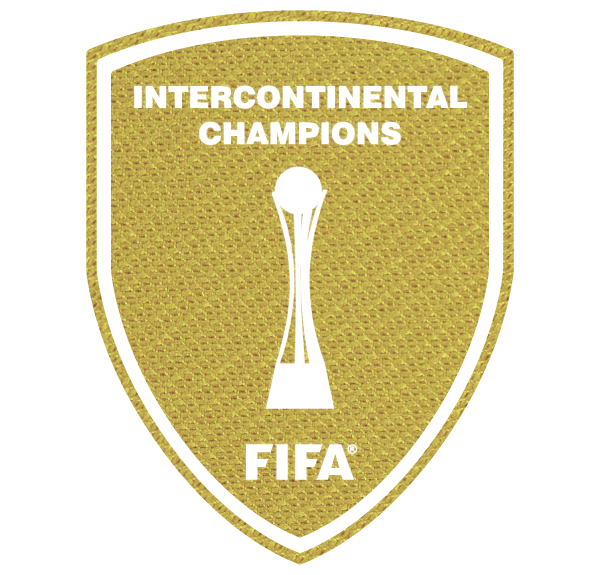
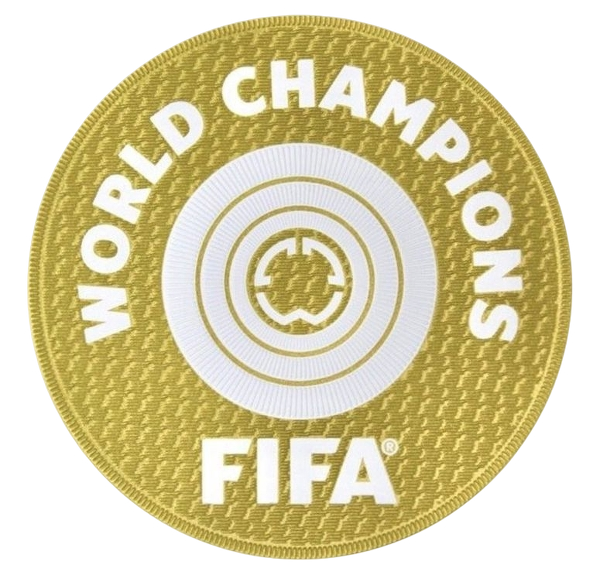
FIFA world champion badges: on the left, the FIFA Intercontinental Cup badge since 2024; on the right, the FIFA Club World Cup badge since 2025.

This list includes the official (de jure) world champion football clubs recognized by FIFA. The official competitions that grant this world title are the Intercontinental Cup (1960–2004), the FIFA Club World Cup (2000–present) and the FIFA Intercontinental Cup (2024–present).

As of 2025, the FIFA Club World Cup and the FIFA Intercontinental Cup coexist as current FIFA club world championships, awarding the titles of quadrennial world club champion and annual world club champion, respectively, to the winning clubs.

The current champions are Chelsea, winners of the 2025 FIFA Club World Cup, and Paris Saint-Germain, winners of the 2025 FIFA Intercontinental Cup.

== Competitions ==
Some world championship trophies

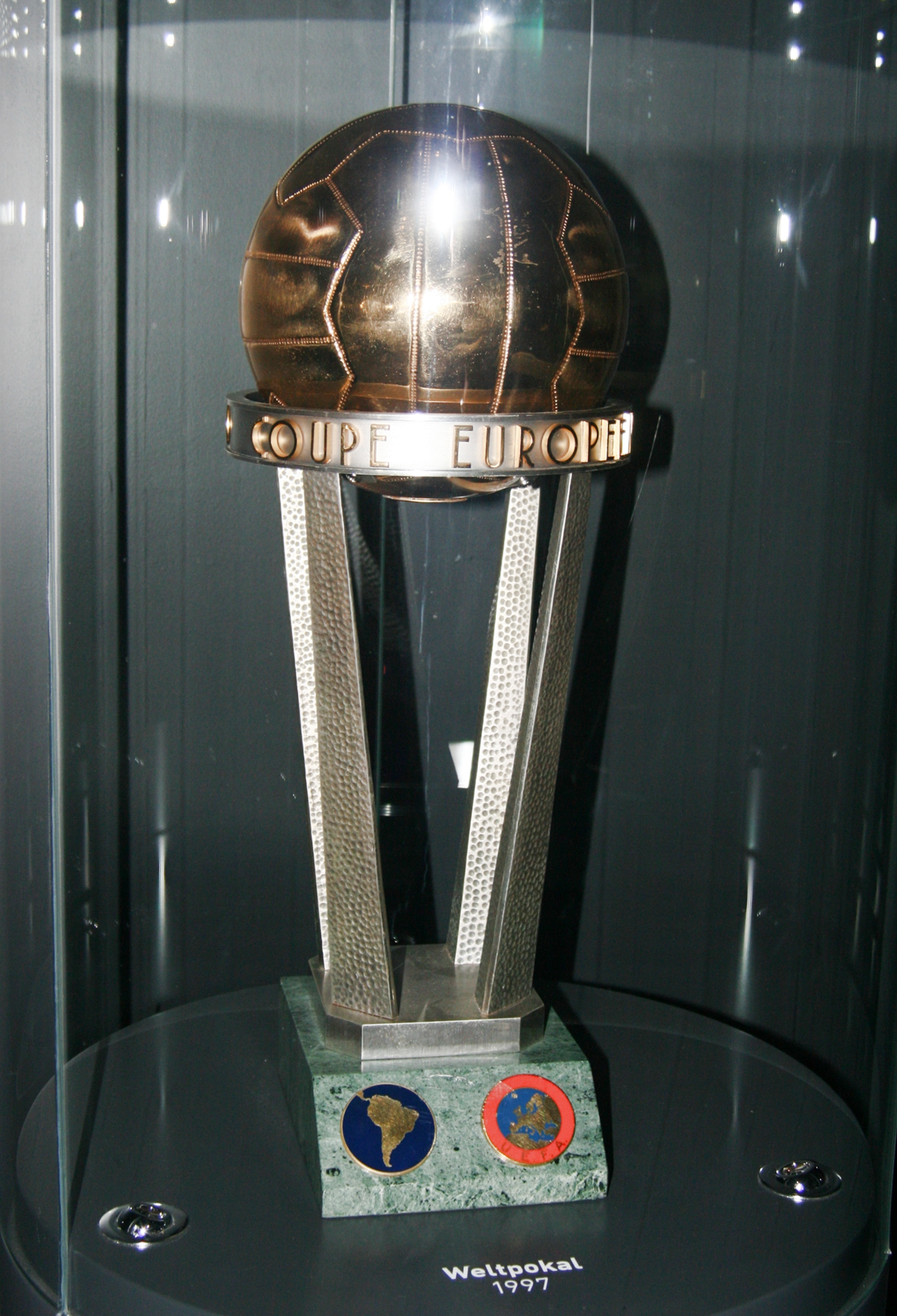
Intercontinental Cup (1960–2004)

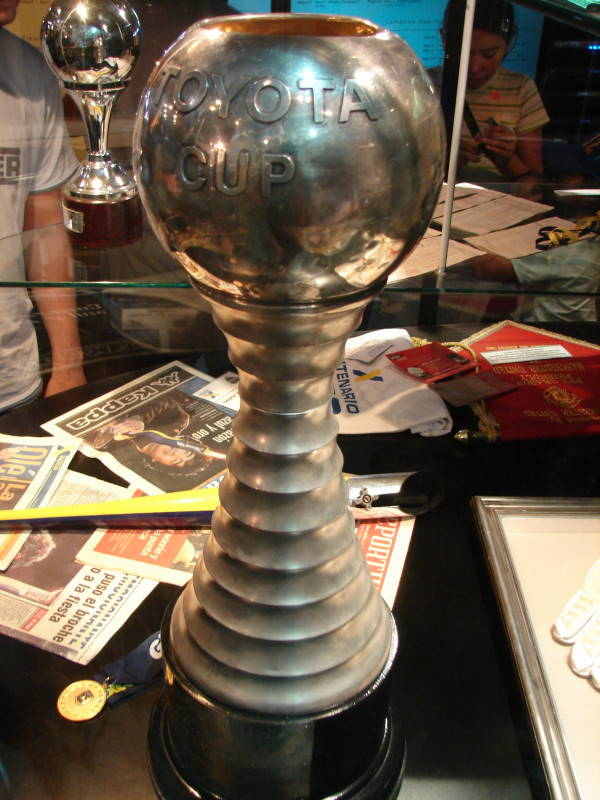
Toyota Cup (1980–2004)

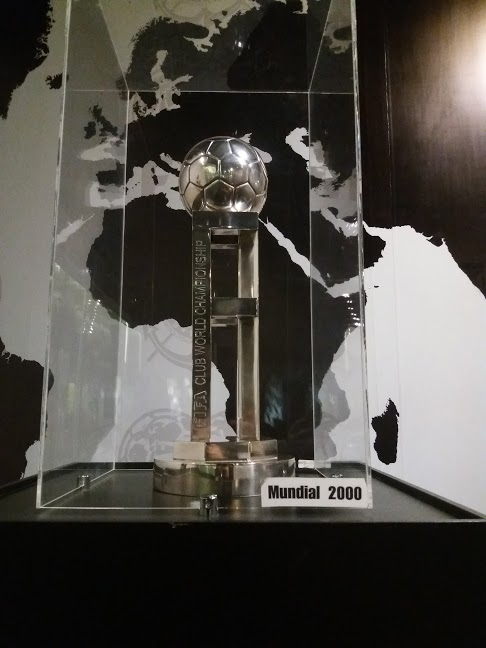
FIFA Club World Championship (2000)

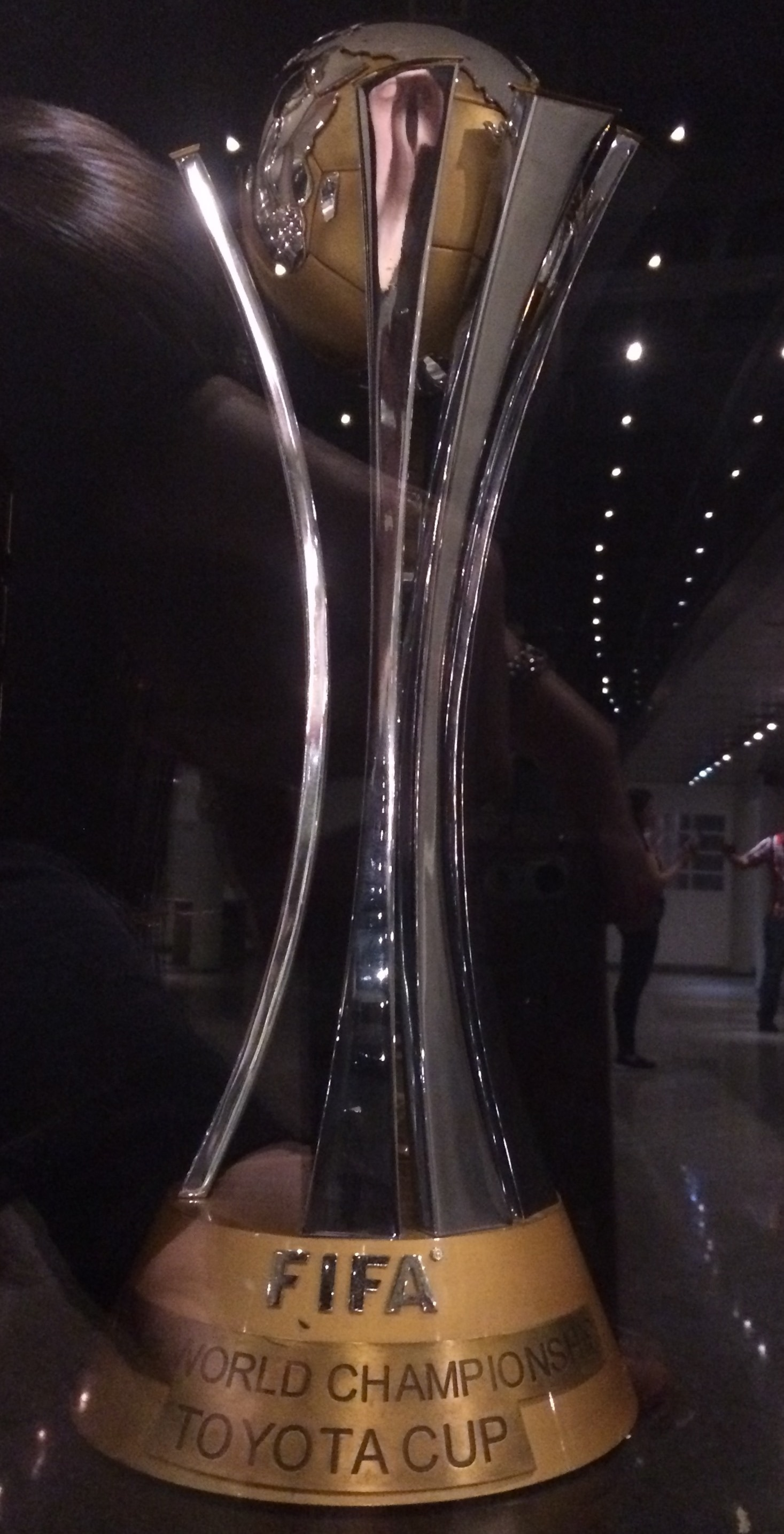
FIFA Club World Cup (2005–2023)

=== Intercontinental Cup ===
The Intercontinental Cup, also known as the European/South American Cup, was an official international football competition endorsed by the Union of European Football Associations (UEFA) and the Confederación Sudamericana de Fútbol (CONMEBOL), contested between representative clubs from these confederations, usually the winners of the European Champions' Cup (now known as the UEFA Champions League), and the South American Copa Libertadores. The competition was played by representative clubs of most developed continents in the football world; has since been replaced by the FIFA Club World Cup. All editions were official UEFA and CONMEBOL competitions, and indirectly also of FIFA.

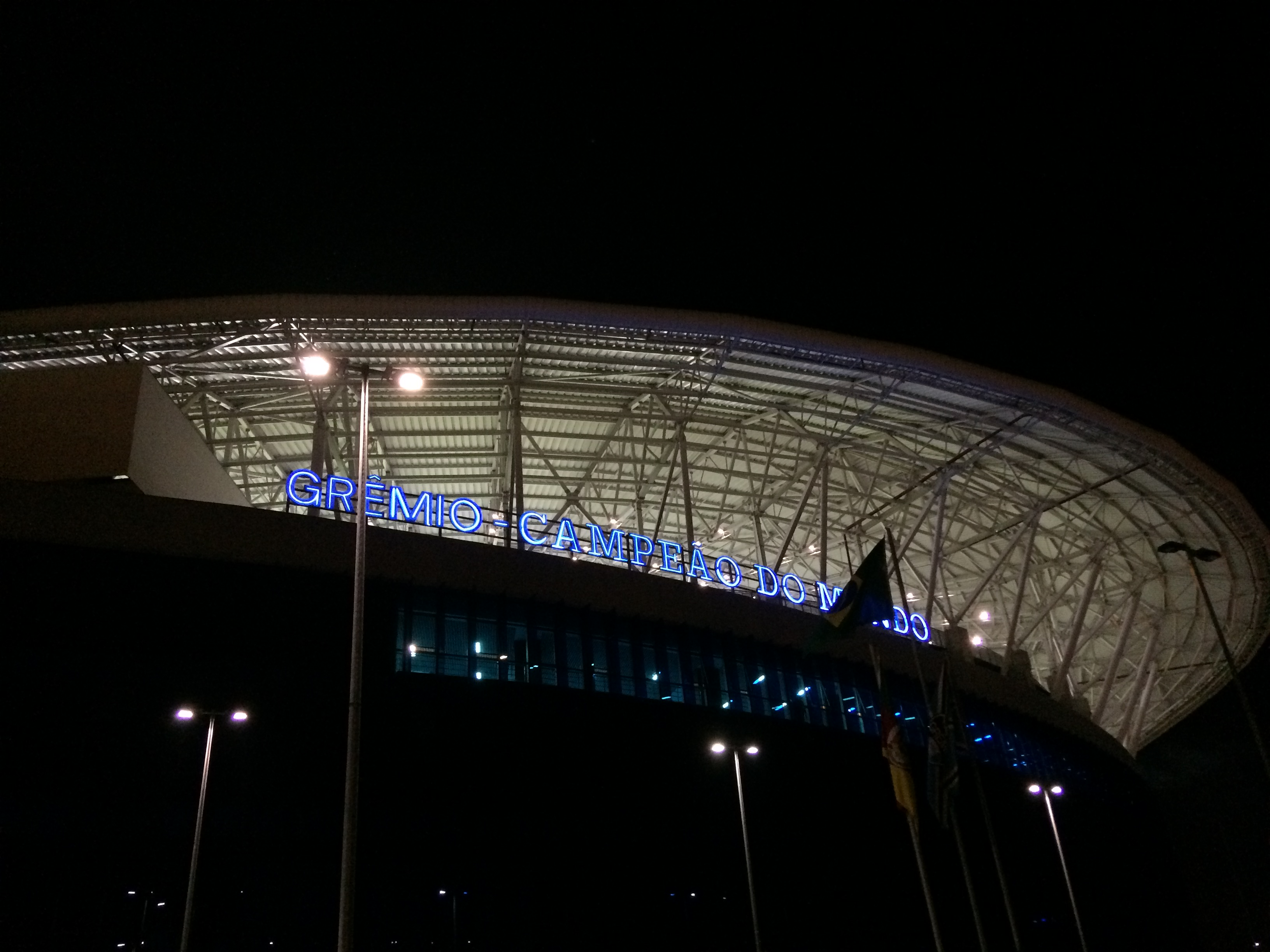
Sign at Arena do Grêmio saying "Grêmio - Campeão do Mundo" (Grêmio - World Champion), celebrating Grêmio's 1983 Intercontinental Cup as a world championship.

From its formation in 1960 to 1979, the competition was contested over a two-legged tie, with a playoff if necessary until 1968, and penalty kicks later. During the 1970s, European participation in the Intercontinental Cup became a running question due to controversial events in the 1969 final, and some European Champions Club' winner teams withdrew. From 1980 until 2004, the competition was contested over a single match held in Japan and sponsored by multinational automaker Toyota, which offered a secondary trophy, the Toyota Cup.

Throughout the history of football, several competitions were created as attempts to determine the "best club team of the world", such as the Football World Championship, the Small Club World Cup, the 1909/1911 Lipton Trophy, The Expo-Paris Cup 1937, the 1951 Copa Rio, the International Soccer League, the 1957 Tournoi de Paris and the Intercontinental Cup. Though some of these cups have been mentioned by FIFA sources as Club World Cups or related concepts, or been the object of recognition requests to FIFA, the Intercontinental Cup is the only one recognised by FIFA, with the approval of its Executive Committee/Council, as the precursor to the FIFA Club World Cup. All the Intercontinental Cup winning teams were regarded by worldwide mass media and the football community, FIFA included (as News Center productions and not cataloged on the FIFA website as official entity documents), as "world champions" de facto. On 27 October 2017, the FIFA Council, while not promoting statistical unification between the Intercontinental Cup and the Club World Cup, in respect to the history of the two tournaments (which merged in 2005), has officialised (de jure) the title of the Intercontinental Cup, recognising all the winners as official club world champions, with the same title of the FIFA Club World Cup winners, or "FIFA Club World Champions".

=== FIFA Club World Cup ===
FIFA Club World Cup is an international men's association football competition organised by FIFA, the sport's global governing body. The tournament officially assigns the world title. The competition was first contested in 2000 as the FIFA Club World Championship. It was not held between 2001 and 2004 due to a combination of factors, most importantly the collapse of FIFA's marketing partner International Sport and Leisure. Since 2005, the competition has been held every year, and has been hosted by Brazil, Japan, the United Arab Emirates and Morocco. The FIFA Club World Cup's prestige is perceived quite differently in different parts of the football world; while it is widely regarded as the most distinguished club-level trophy in South America, it struggles to attract interest in most of Europe compared to the UEFA Champions League and commonly lacks recognition as a high-ranking contest.

The first FIFA Club World Championship took place in Brazil in 2000. but the failure of ISL caused FIFA to discontinue the tournament and cancel the following year competition to be held in Spain. This first failed installment ran parallel with the Intercontinental Cup. FIFA finally managed to buy the prestigious Japanese event and in 2005, after the Intercontinental Cup's last edition, that competition was merged with FIFA and a new trophy replaced the Intercontinental Cup Trophy as well as the Toyota Cup. In 2006, the tournament took its current name.

The format used between 2007 and 2023 involves seven teams competing for the title at venues within the host nation over a period of about two weeks; the winners of that year's AFC Champions League (Asia), CAF Champions League (Africa), CONCACAF Champions League (North America), Copa Libertadores (South America), OFC Champions League (Oceania) and UEFA Champions League (Europe), along with the host nation's national champions, participate in a straight knock-out tournament. The host nation's national champions dispute a play-off against the Oceania champions, from which the winner joins the champions of Asia, Africa, and North America at the quarter-finals. The quarter-final winners go on to face the European and South American champions, who enter the semi-final stage, for a place in the final. In Europe the tournament is almost ignored by the mass media, also because of its sporting level, considered inferior to the Intercontinental Cup, indeed when the sides used to meet in a one-off game in Japan (and even before), this was still a fair fight. The opening up of the global market in football has changed the balance. These days the best South Americans (and the stars from all the other continents) are usually playing in Europe. On 16 December 2022, FIFA announced an expanded tournament that would have 32 teams, quadrennial cadence, and start in June 2025.

=== FIFA Intercontinental Cup ===
The FIFA Intercontinental Cup is an international men's association football competition organised by FIFA, the sport's global governing body. The first edition took place in 2024. The competition features the club champions of the six confederations of FIFA, and is played as a knockout tournament with the European team receiving a bye to the final. The winners are awarded the annual title of World Champions.

== Results by year ==
=== Intercontinental Cup (1960–2004) ===
Key to the table
‡	Play-off to decide champion
(a.e.t.)	Match was won during extra time
(p)	Match was won via a penalty shoot-out

Year	Winners	Score	Runners-up	Venue	Location	Refs.
1960	(Spain) Real Madrid	0–0	(Uruguay) Peñarol	Centenario	Montevideo, Uruguay	
1960	(Spain) Real Madrid	5–1	(Uruguay) Peñarol	Santiago Bernabéu	Madrid, Spain	
1961	(Uruguay) Peñarol	0–1	(Portugal) Benfica	Estádio da Luz	Lisbon, Portugal	
1961	(Uruguay) Peñarol	5–0	(Portugal) Benfica	Centenario	Montevideo, Uruguay	
1961	(Uruguay) Peñarol	2–1^{‡}	(Portugal) Benfica	Centenario	Montevideo, Uruguay	
1962	(Brazil) Santos	3–2	(Portugal) Benfica	Maracanã	Rio de Janeiro, Brazil	
1962	(Brazil) Santos	5–2	(Portugal) Benfica	Estádio da Luz	Lisbon, Portugal	
1963	(Brazil) Santos	2–4	(Italy) Milan	San Siro	Milan, Italy	
1963	(Brazil) Santos	4–2	(Italy) Milan	Maracanã	Rio de Janeiro, Brazil	
1963	(Brazil) Santos	1–0^{‡}	(Italy) Milan	Maracanã	Rio de Janeiro, Brazil	
1964	(Italy) Internazionale	0–1	(Argentina) Independiente	La Doble Visera	Avellaneda, Argentina	
1964	(Italy) Internazionale	2–0	(Argentina) Independiente	San Siro	Milan, Italy	
1964	(Italy) Internazionale	1–0 (a.e.t.)^{‡}	(Argentina) Independiente	Santiago Bernabéu	Madrid, Spain	
1965	(Italy) Internazionale	3–0	(Argentina) Independiente	San Siro	Milan, Italy	
1965	(Italy) Internazionale	0–0	(Argentina) Independiente	La Doble Visera	Avellaneda, Argentina	
1966	(Uruguay) Peñarol	2–0	(Spain) Real Madrid	Centenario	Montevideo, Uruguay	
1966	(Uruguay) Peñarol	2–0	(Spain) Real Madrid	Santiago Bernabéu	Madrid, Spain	
1967	(Argentina) Racing	0–1	(Scotland) Celtic	Hampden Park	Glasgow, Scotland	
1967	(Argentina) Racing	2–1	(Scotland) Celtic	El Cilindro	Avellaneda, Argentina	
1967	(Argentina) Racing	1–0^{‡}	(Scotland) Celtic	Centenario	Montevideo, Uruguay	
1968	(Argentina) Estudiantes	1–0	(England) Manchester United	Estadio Boca Juniors	Buenos Aires, Argentina	
1968	(Argentina) Estudiantes	1–1	(England) Manchester United	Old Trafford	Manchester, England	
1969	(Italy) Milan	3–0	(Argentina) Estudiantes	San Siro	Milan, Italy	
1969	(Italy) Milan	1–2	(Argentina) Estudiantes	Estadio Boca Juniors	Buenos Aires, Argentina	
1970	(Netherlands) Feyenoord	2–2	(Argentina) Estudiantes	Estadio Boca Juniors	Buenos Aires, Argentina	
1970	(Netherlands) Feyenoord	1–0	(Argentina) Estudiantes	De Kuip	Rotterdam, Netherlands	
1971	(Uruguay) Nacional	1–1	(Greece) Panathinaikos (Note: 1970–71 European Cup finalists Panathinaikos replaced the champions Ajax who declined to participate.)	Karaiskakis Stadium	Piraeus, Greece	
1971	(Uruguay) Nacional	2–1	(Greece) Panathinaikos	Centenario	Montevideo, Uruguay	
1972	(Netherlands) Ajax	1–1	(Argentina) Independiente	La Doble Visera	Avellaneda, Argentina	
1972	(Netherlands) Ajax	3–0	(Argentina) Independiente	Olympic Stadium	Amsterdam, Netherlands	
1973	(Argentina) Independiente	1–0	(Italy) Juventus (Note: 1972–73 European Cup finalists Juventus replaced the champions Ajax who declined to contest the meeting in South America, officially for financial reasons.)	Stadio Olimpico	Rome, Italy	
1973	Second leg was not played. (Argentina) Independiente declared winner.					
1974	(Spain) Atlético Madrid (Note: 1973–74 European Cup finalists Atlético Madrid replaced the champions Bayern Munich who declined to participate.)	0–1	(Argentina) Independiente	La Doble Visera	Avellaneda, Argentina	
1974	(Spain) Atlético Madrid	2–0	(Argentina) Independiente	Estadio Vicente Calderón	Madrid, Spain	
1975	(Germany) Bayern Munich and (Argentina) Independiente did not find compatible schedule to play.					
1976	(West Germany) Bayern Munich	2–0	(Brazil) Cruzeiro	Olympiastadion	Munich, West Germany	
1976	(West Germany) Bayern Munich	0–0	(Brazil) Cruzeiro	Mineirão	Belo Horizonte, Brazil	
1977	(Argentina) Boca Juniors	2–2	(West Germany) Borussia Mönchengladbach (Note: 1976–77 European Cup finalists Borussia Mönchengladbach replaced the champions Liverpool who declined to participate.)	Estadio Boca Juniors	Buenos Aires, Argentina	
1977	(Argentina) Boca Juniors	3–0	(West Germany) Borussia Mönchengladbach	Wildparkstadion	Karlsruhe, West Germany	
1978	(England) Liverpool declined to play the match against (Argentina) Boca Juniors due to scheduling problems.					
1979	(Paraguay) Olimpia	1–0	(Sweden) Malmö FF (Note: 1978–79 European Cup finalists Malmö FF replaced the champions Nottingham Forest who declined to participate.)	Malmö Stadion	Malmö, Sweden	
1979	(Paraguay) Olimpia	2–1	(Sweden) Malmö FF	Defensores del Chaco	Asunción, Paraguay	
1980	(Uruguay) Nacional	1–0	(England) Nottingham Forest	National Stadium	Tokyo, Japan	
1981	(Brazil) Flamengo	3–0	(England) Liverpool	National Stadium	Tokyo, Japan	
1982	(Uruguay) Peñarol	2–0	(England) Aston Villa	National Stadium	Tokyo, Japan	
1983	(Brazil) Grêmio	2–1 (a.e.t.)	(West Germany) Hamburger SV	National Stadium	Tokyo, Japan	
1984	(Argentina) Independiente	1–0	(England) Liverpool	National Stadium	Tokyo, Japan	
1985	(Italy) Juventus	2–2 (a.e.t.); (4–2 p)	(Argentina) Argentinos Juniors	National Stadium	Tokyo, Japan	
1986	(Argentina) River Plate	1–0	(Romania) Steaua București	National Stadium	Tokyo, Japan	
1987	(Portugal) Porto	2–1 (a.e.t.)	(Uruguay) Peñarol	National Stadium	Tokyo, Japan	
1988	(Uruguay) Nacional	2–2 (a.e.t.); (7–6 p)	(Netherlands) PSV Eindhoven	National Stadium	Tokyo, Japan	
1989	(Italy) Milan	1–0 (a.e.t.)	(Colombia) Atlético Nacional	National Stadium	Tokyo, Japan	
1990	(Italy) Milan	3–0	(Paraguay) Olimpia	National Stadium	Tokyo, Japan	
1991	(Socialist Federal Republic of Yugoslavia) Red Star Belgrade	3–0	(Chile) Colo-Colo	National Stadium	Tokyo, Japan	
1992	(Brazil) São Paulo	2–1	(Spain) Barcelona	National Stadium	Tokyo, Japan	
1993	(Brazil) São Paulo	3–2	(Italy) Milan (Note: 1992–93 Champions League finalists Milan replaced the champions Marseille who were suspended due to a match fixing and bribery scandal.)	National Stadium	Tokyo, Japan	
1994	(Argentina) Vélez Sársfield	2–0	(Italy) Milan	National Stadium	Tokyo, Japan	
1995	(Netherlands) Ajax	0–0 (a.e.t.); (4–3 p)	(Brazil) Grêmio	National Stadium	Tokyo, Japan	
1996	(Italy) Juventus	1–0	(Argentina) River Plate	National Stadium	Tokyo, Japan	
1997	(Germany) Borussia Dortmund	2–0	(Brazil) Cruzeiro	National Stadium	Tokyo, Japan	
1998	(Spain) Real Madrid	2–1	(Brazil) Vasco da Gama	National Stadium	Tokyo, Japan	
1999	(England) Manchester United	1–0	(Brazil) Palmeiras	National Stadium	Tokyo, Japan	
2000	(Argentina) Boca Juniors	2–1	(Spain) Real Madrid	National Stadium	Tokyo, Japan	
2001	(Germany) Bayern Munich	1–0 (a.e.t.)	(Argentina) Boca Juniors	National Stadium	Tokyo, Japan	
2002	(Spain) Real Madrid	2–0	(Paraguay) Olimpia	International Stadium	Yokohama, Japan	
2003	(Argentina) Boca Juniors	1–1 (a.e.t.); (3–1 p)	(Italy) Milan	International Stadium	Yokohama, Japan	
2004	(Portugal) Porto	0–0 (a.e.t.); (8–7 p)	(Colombia) Once Caldas	International Stadium	Yokohama, Japan	

Notes

- After the events of the 1969 Intercontinental Cup, many European Cup Champions refused to play in the Intercontinental Cup.

=== FIFA Club World Cup (2000–present) ===
Key to the table
†	Match was won during extra time
‡	Match was won via a penalty shoot-out

Edition	Year	Hosts	Winners	Score	Runners-up	Third place	Score	Fourth place	Ref.
1	2000	Brazil	(Brazil) Corinthians (Note: Score was 0–0 after 120 minutes. Corinthians won 4–3 on penalties.)	0–0‡	(Brazil) Vasco da Gama	(Mexico) Necaxa (Note: Extra time was played in the third-place match. Necaxa won 4–3 on penalties.)	1–1‡	(Spain) Real Madrid	
2	2005	Japan	(Brazil) São Paulo	1–0	(England) Liverpool	(Costa Rica) Saprissa	3–2	(Saudi Arabia) Al Ittihad	
3	2006	Japan	(Brazil) Internacional	1–0	(Spain) Barcelona	(Egypt) Al Ahly	2–1	(Mexico) América	
4	2007	Japan	(Italy) Milan	4–2	(Argentina) Boca Juniors	(Japan) Urawa Red Diamonds (Note: No extra time was played in the third-place match. Urawa Red Diamonds won 4–2 on penalties.)	2–2‡	(Tunisia) Étoile du Sahel	
5	2008	Japan	(England) Manchester United	1–0	(Ecuador) LDU Quito	(Japan) Gamba Osaka	1–0	(Mexico) Pachuca	
6	2009	United Arab Emirates	(Spain) Barcelona (Note: Score was 1–1 after 90 minutes.)	2–1^{†}	(Argentina) Estudiantes	(South Korea) Pohang Steelers (Note: No extra time was played in the third-place match. Pohang Steelers won 4–3 on penalties.)	1–1‡	(Mexico) Atlante	
7	2010	United Arab Emirates	(Italy) Internazionale	3–0	(Democratic Republic of the Congo) TP Mazembe	(Brazil) Internacional	4–2	(South Korea) Seongnam Ilhwa Chunma	
8	2011	Japan	(Spain) Barcelona	4–0	(Brazil) Santos	(Qatar) Al Sadd (Note: No extra time was played in the third-place match. Al Sadd won 5–3 on penalties.)	0–0‡	(Japan) Kashiwa Reysol	
9	2012	Japan	(Brazil) Corinthians	1–0	(England) Chelsea	(Mexico) Monterrey	2–0	(Egypt) Al Ahly	
10	2013	Morocco	(Germany) Bayern Munich	2–0	(Morocco) Raja Casablanca	(Brazil) Atlético Mineiro	3–2	(China) Guangzhou Evergrande	
11	2014	Morocco	(Spain) Real Madrid	2–0	(Argentina) San Lorenzo	(New Zealand) Auckland City (Note: No extra time was played in the third-place match. Auckland City won 4–2 on penalties.)	1–1‡	(Mexico) Cruz Azul	
12	2015	Japan	(Spain) Barcelona	3–0	(Argentina) River Plate	(Japan) Sanfrecce Hiroshima	2–1	(China) Guangzhou Evergrande	
13	2016	Japan	(Spain) Real Madrid (Note: Score was 2–2 after 90 minutes.)	4–2^{†}	(Japan) Kashima Antlers	(Colombia) Atlético Nacional (Note: No extra time was played in the third-place match. Atlético Nacional won 4–3 on penalties.)	2–2‡	(Mexico) América	
14	2017	United Arab Emirates	(Spain) Real Madrid	1–0	(Brazil) Grêmio	(Mexico) Pachuca	4–1	(United Arab Emirates) Al Jazira	
15	2018	United Arab Emirates	(Spain) Real Madrid	4–1	(United Arab Emirates) Al Ain	(Argentina) River Plate	4–0	(Japan) Kashima Antlers	
16	2019	Qatar	(England) Liverpool (Note: Score was 0–0 after 90 minutes.)	1–0^{†}	(Brazil) Flamengo	(Mexico) Monterrey (Note: No extra time was played in the third-place match. Monterrey won 4–3 on penalties.)	2–2‡	(Saudi Arabia) Al Hilal	
17	2020	Qatar	(Germany) Bayern Munich	1–0	(Mexico) UANL	(Egypt) Al Ahly (Note: No extra time was played in the third-place match. Al Ahly won 3–2 on penalties.)	0–0‡	(Brazil) Palmeiras	
18	2021	United Arab Emirates	(England) Chelsea (Note: Score was 1–1 after 90 minutes.)	2–1^{†}	(Brazil) Palmeiras	(Egypt) Al Ahly	4–0	(Saudi Arabia) Al Hilal	
19	2022	Morocco	(Spain) Real Madrid	5–3	(Saudi Arabia) Al Hilal	(Brazil) Flamengo	4–2	(Egypt) Al Ahly	
20	2023	Saudi Arabia	(England) Manchester City	4–0	(Brazil) Fluminense	(Egypt) Al Ahly	4–2	(Japan) Urawa Red Diamonds	
21	2025	United States	(England) Chelsea	3–0	(France) Paris Saint-Germain	(Brazil) Fluminense and (Spain) Real Madrid (Note: No third place match was played.)			

=== FIFA Intercontinental Cup (2024–present) ===
Year	Winners		Score	Runners-up		Venue	Location	Attendance
Year	Country	Club	Score	Club	Country	Venue	Location	Attendance
2024	Spain	Real Madrid	3–0	Pachuca	Mexico	Lusail Stadium	Lusail, Qatar	67,249
2025	France	Paris Saint-Germain (Note: Score was 1–1 after 120 minutes. Paris Saint-Germain won 2–1 on penalties.)	1–1‡	Flamengo	Brazil	Ahmad bin Ali Stadium	Al Rayyan, Qatar	42,150

== Winners ==
=== By club ===
In synthesis FIFA has three types of world champions: Intercontinental Cup and those deriving from the Club World Cup (the two competitions, albeit different, confer the same title, that of FIFA club world champions) and from 2024 also the winners of the FIFA Intercontinental Cup have been added to the count. So in accordance to what is officially communicated by FIFA, the total count of official world titles is as follows:

Key

IC	Intercontinental Cup
CWC	FIFA Club World Cup
FIC	FIFA Intercontinental Cup

List of world champion football clubs
Club	Country	Total	IC	CWC	FIC	Years won
Real Madrid	Spain	9	3	5	1	1960, 1998, 2002, 2014, 2016, 2017, 2018, 2022, 2024
Milan	Italy	4	3	1	0	1969, 1989, 1990, 2007
Bayern Munich	Germany	4	2	2	0	1976, 2001, 2013, 2020
Boca Juniors	Argentina	3	3	0	0	1977, 2000 (IC), 2003
Peñarol	Uruguay	3	3	0	0	1961, 1966, 1982
Nacional	Uruguay	3	3	0	0	1971, 1980, 1988
São Paulo	Brazil	3	2	1	0	1992, 1993, 2005
Internazionale	Italy	3	2	1	0	1964, 1965, 2010
Barcelona	Spain	3	0	3	0	2009, 2011, 2015
Santos	Brazil	2	2	0	0	1962, 1963
Independiente	Argentina	2	2	0	0	1973, 1984
Ajax	Netherlands	2	2	0	0	1972, 1995
Juventus	Italy	2	2	0	0	1985, 1996
Porto	Portugal	2	2	0	0	1987, 2004
Manchester United	England	2	1	1	0	1999, 2008
Corinthians	Brazil	2	0	2	0	2000 (CWC), 2012
Chelsea	England	2	0	2	0	2021, 2025 (CWC)
Racing	Argentina	1	1	0	0	1967
Estudiantes	Argentina	1	1	0	0	1968
Feyenoord	Netherlands	1	1	0	0	1970
Atlético Madrid	Spain	1	1	0	0	1974
Olimpia	Paraguay	1	1	0	0	1979
Flamengo	Brazil	1	1	0	0	1981
Grêmio	Brazil	1	1	0	0	1983
River Plate	Argentina	1	1	0	0	1986
Red Star Belgrade	Yugoslavia	1	1	0	0	1991
Vélez Sarsfield	Argentina	1	1	0	0	1994
Borussia Dortmund	Germany	1	1	0	0	1997
Internacional	Brazil	1	0	1	0	2006
Liverpool	England	1	0	1	0	2019
Manchester City	England	1	0	1	0	2023
Paris Saint-Germain	France	1	0	0	1	2025 (FIC)

=== By country ===
Country	Total	IC	CWC	FIC
Spain (3)	13	4	8	1
Brazil (6)	10	6	4	0
Argentina (6)	9	9	0	0
Italy (3)	9	7	2	0
Uruguay (2)	6	6	0	0
England (4)	6	1	5	0
Germany (2)	5	3	2	0
Netherlands (2)	3	3	0	0
Portugal (1)	2	2	0	0
Paraguay (1)	1	1	0	0
Serbia (1)	1	1	0	0
France (1)	1	0	0	1

Note: The number in parentheses represents the number of world champion clubs in that country.

=== By confederation ===
Confederation	Total	IC	CWC	FIC
UEFA (17)	40	21	17	2
CONMEBOL (15)	26	22	4	0

Note: The number in parentheses represents the number of world champion clubs in that confederation.

== See also ==
- Football World Championship
- Sir Thomas Lipton Trophy
- Tournoi de Paris
- Copa Rio
- Small Club World Cup
- List of association football competitions
- List of football clubs by competitive honours won
