= Sergio Barreto =

Argentine footballer (born 1999)

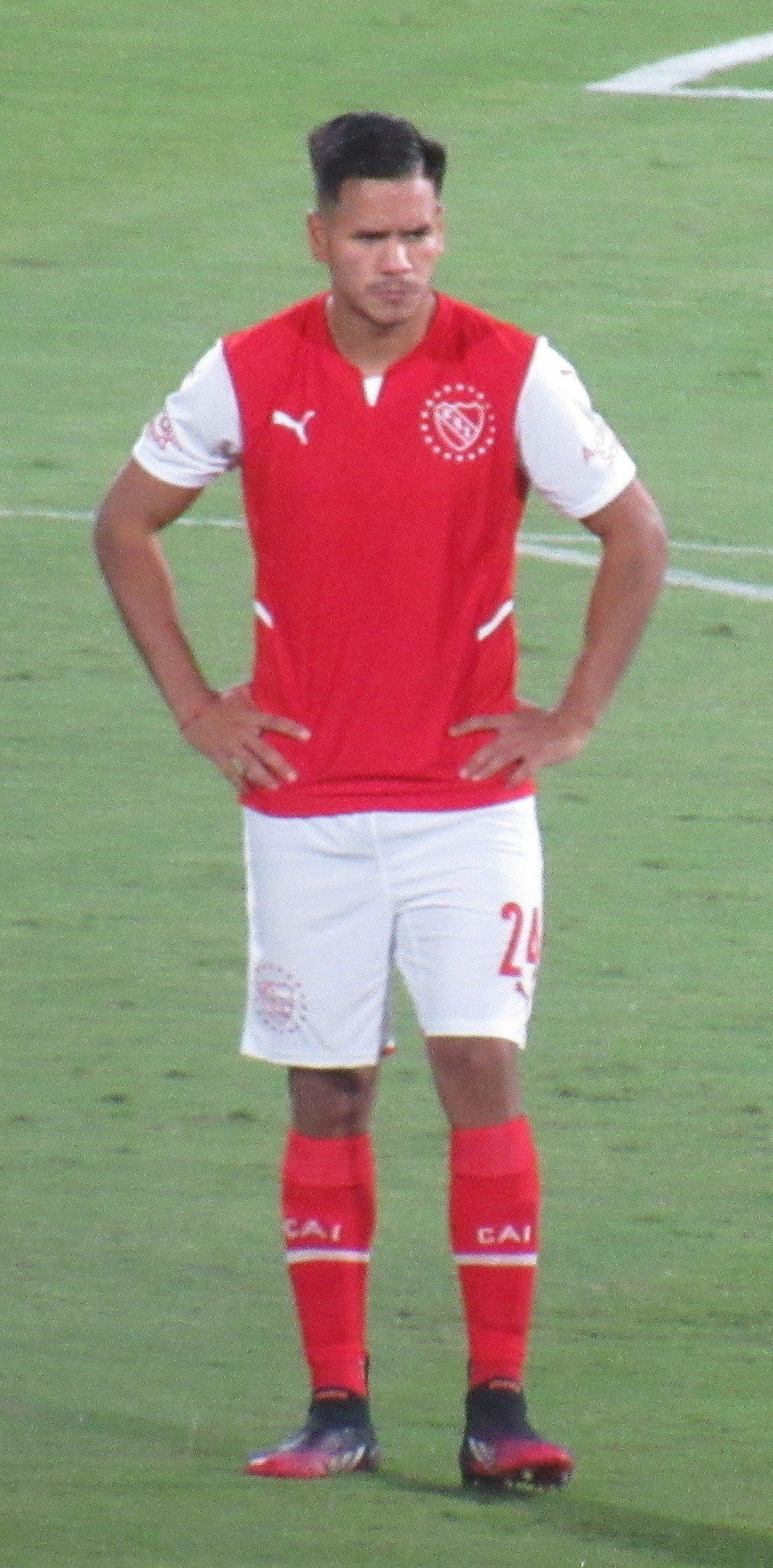
- Barreto in 2022

Personal information
- Full name: Sergio Damián Barreto
- Date of birth: 20 April 1999 (age 27)
- Place of birth: Clorinda, Formosa, Argentina
- Height: 1.84 m (6 ft 0 in)
- Position: Centre-back

Team information
- Current team: Pachuca
- Number: 2

Youth career
- 2008–2017: Independiente

Senior career*
Years	Team	Apps	(Gls)
2017–2023	Independiente	100	(1)
2023–	Pachuca	57	(2)
- * Club domestic league appearances and goals as of 19 August 2025

Sergio Damián Barreto (born 20 April 1999) is an Argentine professional footballer who plays as a centre-back for Liga MX club Pachuca.

== Career ==
After joining Independiente in 2008, Barreto was promoted into the club's first-team squad in 2017. He made his debut on 9 December by playing the full ninety minutes in a victory away to Arsenal de Sarandí.

On 13 June 2023, Pachuca announced the signing of Barreto, purchasing 70% of the player's rights.

== Career statistics ==
As of 10 December 2024

Appearances and goals by club, season and competition
Club	Season	League			National cup (Note: Includes the Copa Argentina)		Continental (Note: Includes the Copa Libertadores, Copa Sudamericana and CONCACAF Champions Cup)		Other (Note: Includes the Leagues Cup and Campeón de Campeones)		Total	
Club	Season	Division	Apps	Goals	Apps	Goals	Apps	Goals	Apps	Goals	Apps	Goals
Independiente	2017–18	Primera División	1	0	0	0	0	0	—		1	0
Independiente	2018–19	Primera División	1	0	0	0	0	0	—		1	0
Independiente	2019–20	Primera División	4	0	0	0	0	0	—		4	0
Independiente	2020–21	Primera División	7 (Note: Appearances in Copa de la Liga Profesional)	0	2	0	2	0	—		11	0
Independiente	2021	Primera División	38	1	0	0	6	0	—		44	1
Independiente	2022	Primera División	35	0	4	0	5	0	—		44	0
Independiente	2023	Primera División	14	0	1	0	0	0	—		15	0
Independiente	Total		100	1	7	0	13	0	0	0	120	1
Pachuca	2023–24	Liga MX	33	1	0	0	0	0	2	0	35	1
Pachuca	2024–25	Liga MX	15	0	0	0	5	0	2	0	22	0
Pachuca	Total		48	1	0	0	5	0	4	0	57	1
Career total			148	2	7	0	18	0	0	0	177	2

== Honours ==
Independiente

- Suruga Bank Championship: 2018

Pachuca

- CONCACAF Champions Cup: 2024
- FIFA Challenger Cup: 2024
- FIFA Derby of the Americas: 2024
