= Pedro Pedraza =

Mexican footballer (born 2000)

Personal information
- Full name: Pedro Pedraza Reyna
- Date of birth: 30 April 2000 (age 26)
- Place of birth: Monterrey, Nuevo León, Mexico
- Height: 1.83 m (6 ft 0 in)
- Position: Midfielder

Team information
- Current team: Necaxa (on loan from Pachuca)
- Number: 16

Youth career
- 2016–2019: Zacatecas
- 2022: Pachuca

Senior career*
Years	Team	Apps	(Gls)
2018–2021	Zacatecas	37	(2)
2022–	Pachuca	87	(1)
2026–	→ Necaxa (loan)	10	(0)
- * Club domestic league appearances and goals as of 6 November 2026

Pedro Pedraza Reyna (born 30 April 2000) is a Mexican professional footballer who plays as a midfielder for Liga MX club Necaxa, on loan from Pachuca.

== Club career ==
Pedraza began his career at the academy of Zacatecas academy before making his professional debut on 5 September 2019 in a 2–3 loss to Tijuana on Copa MX where he was subbed in at the 79th minute.

In 2022, Pedraza moved to Pachuca, making his Liga MX debut in a 3–0 semifinal win against América on 23 May, being subbed in at the 87th minute.

On 22 June 2026, Pedraza was loaned to Necaxa.

== Career statistics ==
=== Club ===
As of match played on 6 November 2026

Club	Season	League			Cup		Continental		Intercontinental		Other		Total	
Club	Season	Division	Apps	Goals	Apps	Goals	Apps	Goals	Apps	Goals	Apps	Goals	Apps	Goals
Zacatecas	2019–20	Ascenso MX	—		2	0	—		—		—		2	0
Zacatecas	2020–21	Liga de Expansión MX	25	2	—		—		—		—		25	2
Zacatecas	2021–22	Liga de Expansión MX	12	0	—		—		—		—		12	0
Zacatecas	Total		37	2	2	0	—		—		—		39	2
Pachuca	2021–22	Liga MX	1	0	—		—		—		—		1	0
Pachuca	2022–23	Liga MX	5	0	1 (Note: Appearance in Campeón de Campeones)	0	—		—		—		6	0
Pachuca	2023–24	Liga MX	27	0	—		7 (Note: Appearances in CONCACAF Champions Cup)	0	—		—		34	0
Pachuca	2024–25	Liga MX	33	1	—		—		3 (Note: Appearances in FIFA Intercontinental Cup)	0	2 (Note: Appearances in Leagues Cup)	0	38	1
Pachuca	2025–26	Liga MX	21	0	—		—		2 (Note: Appearances in FIFA Club World Cup)	0	4	0	27	0
Pachuca	Total		87	1	1	0	7	0	5	0	6	0	106	1
Necaxa	2026–27	Liga MX	10	0	—		—		—		3 (Note: Appearances in Leagues Cup)	0	13	0
Career total			134	3	3	0	7	0	5	0	9	0	158	3

== Honours ==
Pachuca

- Liga MX: Apertura 2022
- CONCACAF Champions Cup: 2024
