= Nelson Deossa =

Colombian footballer (born 2000)

Personal information
- Full name: Nelson Alexander Deossa Suárez
- Date of birth: 6 February 2000 (age 26)
- Place of birth: Marmato, Colombia
- Height: 1.85 m (6 ft 1 in)
- Position: Central midfielder

Team information
- Current team: Betis
- Number: 18

Youth career
- Atlético Huila

Senior career*
Years	Team	Apps	(Gls)
2021–2023	Atlético Huila	19	(1)
2022	→ Estudiantes (loan)	8	(0)
2022	→ Junior (loan)	17	(2)
2023	→ Atlético Nacional (loan)	38	(5)
2024	Pachuca	36	(7)
2025	Monterrey	21	(5)
2025–	Betis	31	(0)

International career^{‡}
2026–	Colombia	1	(0)
- * Club domestic league appearances and goals as of 20:26, 31 October 2026 (UTC) ‡ National team caps and goals as of 13 November 2026

Nelson Alexander Deossa Suárez (born 6 February 2000) is a Colombian professional footballer who plays as a central midfielder for La Liga club Real Betis and the Colombia national team.

== Career ==
=== Early years ===
Deossa made his debut for Atlético Huila on 25 January 2021, as a substitute against Bogotá FC in the Categoría Primera B. His first start was against La Equidad, on 28 September 2021 in the a LigaPro Serie A. On 22 January 2022, Deossa joined Argentine club Estudiantes, on a one-year loan. On 9 July 2022, after terminating his contract with the Argentine club, he returned to Colombia and joined Junior on loan. On 24 January 2023, he joined Atlético Nacional on loan, with an option to buy.

=== Pachuca ===
On 29 December 2023, Liga MX club Pachuca announced the permanent signing of Deossa. He was part of the side that won the 2024 CONCACAF Champions Cup, playing the whole game as Pachuca beat Columbus Crew 3–0.

=== Monterrey ===
On 9 January 2025, Deossa joined fellow Liga MX club Monterrey, signing a four-year contract.

=== Betis ===
On 4 August 2025, Real Betis and Monterrey reached an agreement for the transfer of Deossa.

== International career ==
Deossa made his debut for the Colombia national team on 13 November 2026 in a friendly against Chile.

== Career statistics ==
=== Club ===
As of match played 31 October 2026

Appearances and goals by club, season and competition
Club	Season	League			National cup (Note: Includes Copa Colombia, Copa Argentina, Copa del Rey)		Continental		Other		Total	
Club	Season	Division	Apps	Goals	Apps	Goals	Apps	Goals	Apps	Goals	Apps	Goals
Atlético Huila	2021	Categoría Primera B	7	0	1	0	—		—		8	0
Atlético Huila	2021	LigaPro Serie A	12	1	—		—		—		12	1
Atlético Huila	Total		19	1	1	0	—		—		20	1
Estudiantes (loan)	2022	AFA Liga Profesional de Fútbol	8	0	1	0	1 (Note: Appearances in Copa Libertadores)	0	—		11	0
Junior (loan)	2022	LigaPro Serie A	17	2	4	0	—		—		21	2
Atlético Nacional (loan)	2023	LigaPro Serie A	38	5	6	1	6	0	—		50	6
Pachuca	2023–24	Liga MX	20	5	—		7 (Note: Appearances in CONCACAF Champions Cup)	2	—		27	7
Pachuca	2024–25	Liga MX	16	2	—		—		3 (Note: Three appearances and one goal in FIFA Intercontinental Cup, three appearances in Leagues Cup)	1	23	3
Pachuca	Total		36	7	0	0	7	2	6	1	49	10
Monterrey	2024–25	Liga MX	21	5	—		4	0	4 (Note: Appearances in FIFA Club World Cup)	1	29	5
Real Betis	2025–26	La Liga	20	0	4	0	9 (Note: Appearances in UEFA Europa League)	0	0	0	33	0
Real Betis	2026–27	La Liga	11	0	0	0	3 (Note: Appearances in UEFA Champions League)	0	—		14	0
Real Betis	Total		31	0	4	0	12	0	0	0	47	0
Career total			170	20	16	1	30	2	10	2	227	24

== Honors ==
Atlético Huila

- Categoría Primera B: 2021

Atlético Nacional

- Superliga Colombiana: 2023
- Copa Colombia: 2023

Pachuca

- CONCACAF Champions Cup: 2024
- FIFA Derby of the Americas: 2024
- FIFA Challenger Cup: 2024

Individual

- Liga MX All-Star: 2024
