= Salomón Rondón =

Venezuelan football player (born 1989)

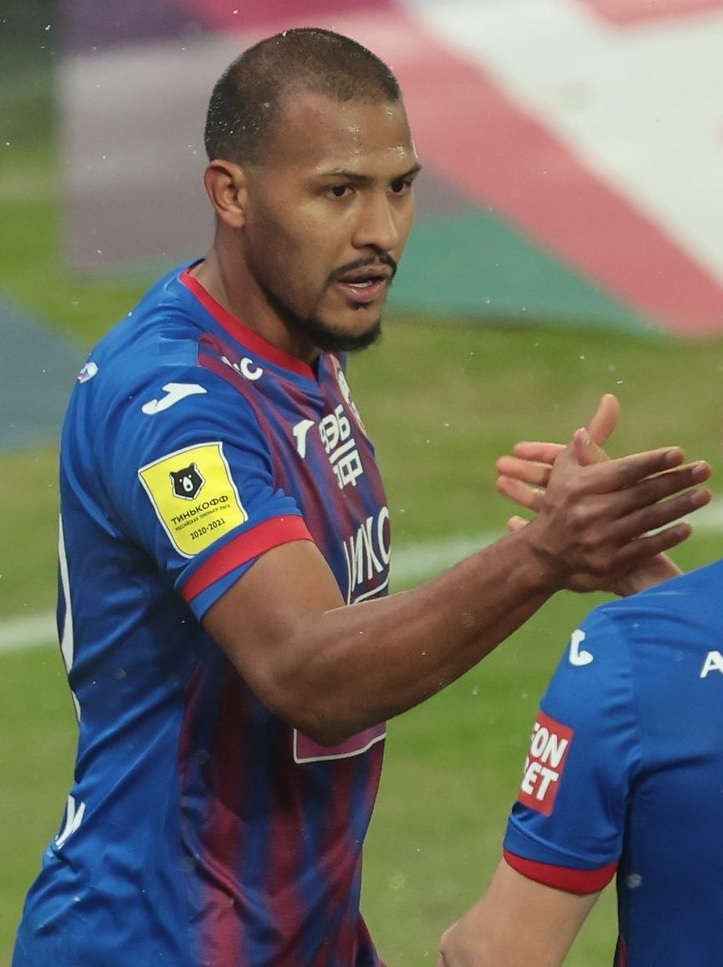
- Rondón with CSKA Moscow in 2021

Personal information
- Full name: José Salomón Rondón Giménez
- Date of birth: 16 September 1989 (age 37)
- Place of birth: Caracas, Venezuela
- Height: 1.90 m (6 ft 3 in)
- Position: Striker

Team information
- Current team: Pachuca
- Number: 23

Youth career
- 1996–2004: San José de Calasanz
- 2004–2005: Deportivo Gulima
- 2005–2006: Aragua

Senior career*
Years	Team	Apps	(Gls)
2006–2008	Aragua	49	(15)
2008–2010	Las Palmas	46	(10)
2010–2012	Málaga	67	(25)
2012–2014	Rubin Kazan	36	(13)
2014–2015	Zenit Saint Petersburg	37	(20)
2015–2019	West Bromwich Albion	108	(30)
2018–2019	→ Newcastle United (loan)	32	(11)
2019–2021	Dalian Professional	27	(14)
2020–2021	→ CSKA Moscow (loan)	10	(4)
2021–2022	Everton	27	(1)
2023	River Plate	31	(10)
2024–	Pachuca	86	(43)
2025	→ Oviedo (loan)	16	(2)

International career^{‡}
2008–2009	Venezuela U20	11	(7)
2008–	Venezuela	122	(50)
Medal record
Men's football
Representing Venezuela
FIFA Series
Runner-up	2026 Uzbekistan
- * Club domestic league appearances and goals as of 03:21, 11 October 2026 (UTC) ‡ National team caps and goals as of 19:00, 30 March 2026 (UTC)

José Salomón Rondón Giménez (Spanish pronunciation: [saloˈmon ronˈdon]; born 16 September 1989) is a Venezuelan professional footballer who plays as a striker for Liga MX club Pachuca and captains the Venezuela national team.

After starting out at Aragua, Rondón went on to spend most of his career in Europe, appearing in La Liga with Málaga, the Russian Premier League with Rubin Kazan, Zenit Saint Petersburg (winning the 2015 national championship with the latter club) and CSKA Moscow, and the Premier League with West Bromwich Albion, Newcastle United and Everton. In 2023, he returned to the Americas, as he signed for the Argentine club River Plate, winning the Argentine Primera División title before joining a Mexican club Pachuca, four days after his departure from the club. While in Pachuca, he won the CONCACAF Champions Cup in his debut season, as well as finishing as the top scorer in the tournament.

A Venezuela international since 2008, Rondón has earned over 120 caps and is the country's all-time top goalscorer with 50 goals. He represented his country in five Copa América tournaments, helping them to fourth place in 2011.

== Club career ==
=== Aragua ===
Born in Caracas, Rondón's sporting idols growing up were Ronaldo and Michael Jordan. He made his debut in the Venezuelan Primera División at the age of 17, appearing for Aragua FC against Carabobo FC on 8 October 2006; on 8 April of the following year he scored his first goals for the club, in a 2–2 draw against Caracas FC.

=== Las Palmas ===
In the summer of 2008, Rondón was signed by UD Las Palmas in Spain, and made his official debut on 5 October in a 1–2 away loss against Deportivo Alavés in the Segunda División. Almost a year after his arrival, on 2 September 2009, he netted his first goal, in a Copa del Rey match against Cádiz CF – becoming the youngest foreign player to ever score for the club, at the age of 19 years, 11 months and 17 days – and finished the season with ten goals in 36 games, as the Canary Islands side narrowly avoided relegation.

=== Málaga ===
On 19 July 2010, Málaga CF signed Rondón for a record €3.5 million transfer fee. He scored his first goal for the Andalusians exactly two months later, in a 1–2 home defeat against Sevilla FC in La Liga. Four days later, he opened the score in a 2–0 win at Getafe CF, adding a third the following week in a 2–3 home loss to Villarreal CF.

On 1 May 2011, Rondón contributed with one goal as Málaga came from behind at home to defeat Hércules CF 3–1. That was his 13th goal of the campaign, with which he surpassed the record of goals from a Venezuelan footballer in the Spanish top flight previously held by Juan Arango; the team finally escaped relegation, with the player finishing as their top scorer.

Rondón started 2011–12 on the substitutes bench. He eventually beat competition from ageing Ruud van Nistelrooy, again finishing as Málaga's best scorer – this included goals in narrow home wins against RCD Espanyol (2–1) and Levante UD (1–0), and a brace against Rayo Vallecano (4–2 success, also at La Rosaleda Stadium).

=== Rubin Kazan ===
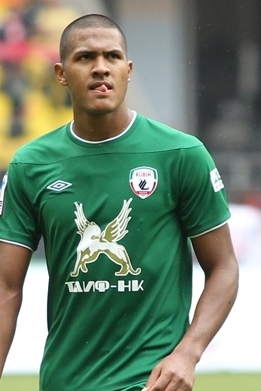
Rondón with Rubin Kazan in 2012

In August 2012, Rondón signed for Russian Premier League team FC Rubin Kazan, for a reported fee of €10 million which made him the most expensive Venezuelan player in history. He made his league debut on the 12th in a 2–0 home win over FC Dynamo Moscow, and he scored his first goal against FC Terek Grozny on 1 September, albeit in a 1–2 home defeat.

Rondón made his first appearance in the UEFA Europa League against Inter Milan, and he scored once in a 2–2 group stage away draw, also playing the entire match. In the second match between the two sides he netted a brace in the final three minutes, helping his team to a 3–0 win.

On 10 March 2013, following the winter break in the Russian Premier League, Rondón scored the only goal of the match as Rubin claimed a home victory over reigning champions FC Zenit Saint Petersburg. In continental competition, he opened up the scoring in the 100th minute of the round-of-16 clash against Levante, latching on to a cross from Bibras Natcho as the hosts won it 2–0 in that leg and on aggregate.

Rondón opened the scoring for Rubin on 19 April 2013, as they could only manage a 1–1 draw at relegation-threatened FC Amkar Perm. In the club's next league match, against PFC CSKA Moscow, he netted the first goal in a 2–0 victory over the league leaders and eventual champions.

On 1 September 2013, Rondón scored a hat-trick in a 3–0 win against recently promoted FC Ural Sverdlovsk Oblast.

=== Zenit Saint Petersburg ===
On 31 January 2014, Rondón underwent a medical and joined fellow league club Zenit Saint Petersburg, signing a five-year contract for a fee in the region of £15.8 million. He played his first game for his new team on 25 February, scoring in an eventual 2–1 away win against Borussia Dortmund in the UEFA Champions League's round of 16-second-leg (4–5 aggregate defeat).

Again as a second-half substitute, Rondón scored a rare second-half hat-trick on 6 April 2014 in a 6–2 home routing of former team Rubin. On 20 September he added another three, in a 5–0 win at FC Rostov.

Rondón scored a brace at home against PSV Eindhoven on 26 February 2015, being essential in a 3–0 home victory for the Europa League round of 32 and a 4–0 aggregate triumph.

=== West Bromwich Albion ===
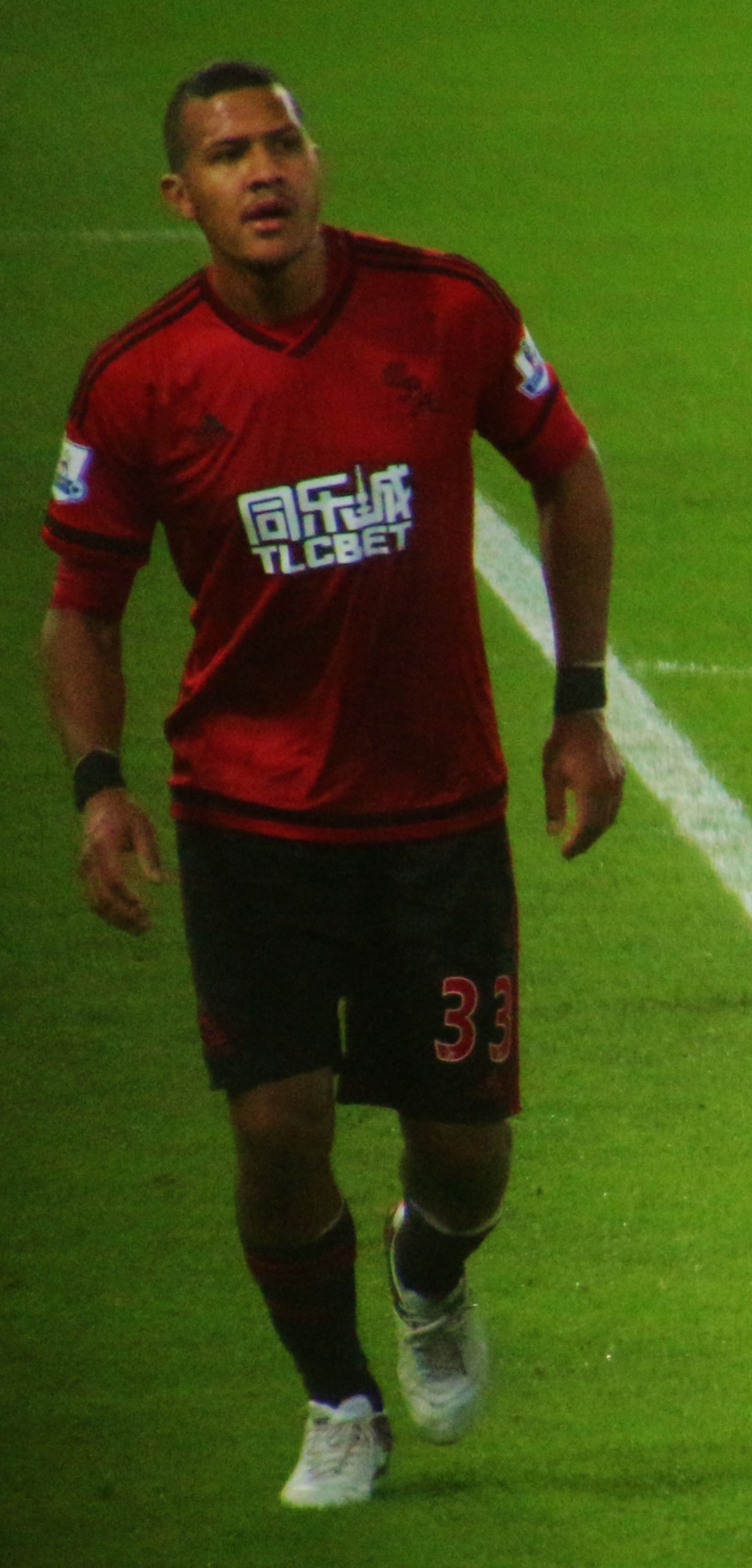
Rondón playing for West Bromwich Albion in 2016

On 10 August 2015, Rondón joined English club West Bromwich Albion on a four-year deal for a club-record fee of £12 million. He made his debut in the Premier League five days later, replacing Craig Gardner in the 62nd minute of an eventual 0–0 away draw against Watford. On 23 August, he made his first start, at the expense of Tottenham Hotspur-linked Saido Berahino, in a 2–3 home defeat to Chelsea, assisting James Morrison in his first goal and later being brought down by John Terry who received a straight red card.

Rondón scored his first goal for the Baggies on 29 August 2015, netting the game's only in stoppage time of the first half of the away fixture against nine-man Stoke City. On 19 December, he was sent off at the end of a 1–2 home loss to AFC Bournemouth for thrusting his head at Dan Gosling, with teammate James McClean also dismissed in the first half; he finished his first season in English football with ten goals.

Rondón began the 2016–17 campaign strongly, scoring the winner in the opening match win over Crystal Palace, then continued his impressive form in September with goals in consecutive matches against West Ham United and Stoke. On 21 November he netted once and provided an assist in a 4–0 victory over Burnley, and on 14 December, against Swansea City, he scored his first Premier League hat-trick after netting three headers in a 3–1 win, which was only the second time this feat was achieved in the history of the competition, the first being Everton's Duncan Ferguson in 1997.

Rondón's goal in a 1–1 draw with Tottenham, on 25 November 2017, made him the first Venezuelan to score at either the rebuilt Wembley Stadium or the original facilities, as well as the first Albion player to score at the new ground. The following 20 January, early into the second half of the away fixture against Everton, he accidentally broke James McCarthy's leg, and was reduced to tears upon realising the extent of McCarthy's injury; recalling the incident in an interview some months later also caused him to become upset.

=== Newcastle United ===
On 6 August 2018, Rondón joined Newcastle United on a one-year loan swap, with Dwight Gayle heading in the opposite direction. He made his debut five days later, in a 2–1 home loss against Tottenham on the opening day of the season. He scored his first goal in a 3–1 EFL Cup defeat at Nottingham Forest on 29 August.

Rondón opened his league account on 10 November 2018, scoring twice to help the hosts defeat Bournemouth 2–1. In the second half of the season, his partnership up front with Ayoze Pérez began to take shape and the Venezuelan often assisted the Spaniard with his goals. He also maintained a steady record in terms of goalscoring and was neck-and-neck with Pérez until the latter stages of the campaign, finishing with eleven league goals—just one behind his teammate.

In May 2019, Rondón was named Newcastle's player of the year, becoming the first forward to win the award since Alan Shearer in 2003.

=== Dalian Professional ===
On 19 July 2019, Rondón signed with Dalian Yifang of the Chinese Super League, reuniting with manager Rafael Benítez who had joined the club two weeks before and reportedly activated the player's release clause of £16.5 million.

=== CSKA Moscow ===
On 15 February 2021, Rondón joined Russian Premier League side CSKA Moscow on loan. In his first match at Arena CSKA, Rondón scored his first goal for the Moscow team and also gave an assist, merits that led him to be named the best player of the match. Furthermore, he was voted the best CSKA player of the month of March. Rondón ended his time at CSKA becoming one of the most valuable players in the Russian competition after participating in 37.5% of the team's goals since his arrival with four goals and two assists of the team's 16 goals in that time.

=== Everton ===
On 31 August 2021 Rondón joined Everton on a free transfer, reuniting with his former Newcastle and Dalian Pro manager Rafael Benítez. He signed a two-year contract with the option for a third season. He scored his first goal for the club on 12 December against Crystal Palace in a 3–1 loss at Selhurst Park.

On 3 March 2022, he scored both goals in a 2–0 victory over National League side Boreham Wood at Goodison Park in the fifth round of the FA Cup. With Jarrad Branthwaite already sent off, he was shown a red card on 15 May in a 3–2 home loss to Brentford for a foul on Rico Henry within four minutes of entering the pitch; he wrote an apology. Everton announced that Rondón had left on 16 December "with immediate effect after reaching an agreement with the club to terminate his contract".

=== River Plate ===
On 31 January 2023, Rondón signed for River Plate in Argentina, on a contract until December 2025. He played 34 games overall in his first year in Buenos Aires, scoring 10 goals, one behind club top scorer Miguel Borja; the team won the Argentine Primera División title. His tally started on 9 April with two goals in a 3–0 win at Club Atlético Huracán, and included the opener of a 2–0 victory away to Boca Juniors in the Superclásico on 1 October. On 26 December 2023, Rondón and River Plate reached an agreement to terminate the player's contract.

=== Late career ===
In December 2023, Rondón joined Mexican club Pachuca. On 2 June 2024, he scored 2 goals for Pachuca in a 3–0 win against Columbus Crew in the CONCACAF Champions Cup final. He was also the tournament's top goal scorer, with 9 goals.

In July 2025, Rondón returned to La Liga after agreeing to a one-year loan deal with newly promoted Real Oviedo. Later that year, on 30 September, he scored his first goal for the club in a 2–1 away win over Valencia. In January 2026, Rondón returned to Mexico after his loan deal was terminated early. In November 2026, he finished the Apertura 2026 tournament as the league's top scorer.

== International career ==
=== Youth ===
Rondón appeared for the Venezuela under-20 side in the 2009 FIFA World Cup in Egypt. He scored four times during the competition – as teammate Yonathan del Valle, with both netting hat-tricks in the 8–0 group stage routing of Tahiti – as the former managed to qualify for the Round of 16 stage.

=== Senior ===
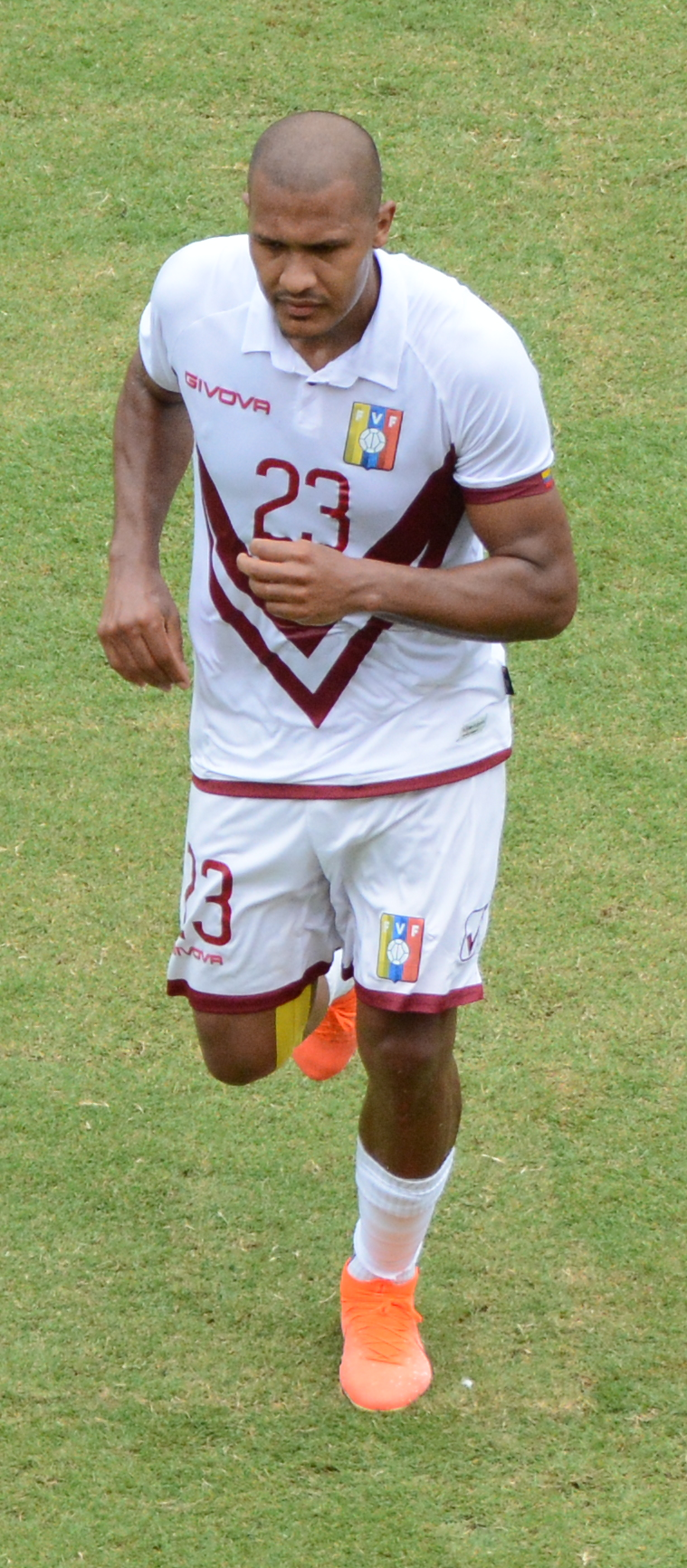
Rondón playing for Venezuela in 2019

Previously, on 3 February 2008, 18-year-old Rondón made his debut for the senior team in a friendly with Haiti, scoring his first goal on 23 March against El Salvador (another exhibition match, another 1–0 win). In the 2011 Copa América in Argentina, the team came fourth and received copper medals; he scored to open a 3–3 draw with Paraguay that saw both teams advance. Selected by manager Noel Sanvicente to the 2015 Copa América, he scored in La Vinotinto's first game of the tournament to help defeat Colombia 1–0; later that year, he was among 15 national players who threatened to quit the team after the president of the Venezuelan Football Federation accused them of conspiring to get the manager sacked. On 5 June 2016, during the 2016 Copa América Centenario, Rondón earned his 50th cap, starting in a 1–0 group stage win against Jamaica in Chicago. He scored the only goal of the following game against Uruguay to become the first Venezuelan player to find the net at three tournaments, and repeated the feat in the quarter-finals, a 1–4 defeat to Argentina.

On 10 June 2019, after his brace in a 3–0 friendly victory over the United States in Cincinnati, Rondón surpassed former holder Juan Arango to become Venezuela's all-time top scorer at 24 goals. He scored a hat-trick on 19 November in a 4–1 win over hosts Japan at the 2019 Kirin Challenge Cup, and netted another treble on 28 January 2022 in the unsuccessful qualification campaign for the year's World Cup, defeating Bolivia by the same score in Barinas. He had missed the 2021 Copa América due to strict COVID-19 regulations in his country of residence, China.

In the 2026 FIFA World Cup qualification match on 17 October 2023, Rondón earned his 100th cap in which he scored a goal in a 3–0 win against Chile.

== Career statistics ==
=== Club ===
As of match played on 26 September 2026

Appearances and goals by club, season and competition
Club	Season	League			National cup (Note: Includes Copa Venezuela, Copa del Rey, Russian Cup, FA Cup, Chinese FA Cup, Copa Argentina, Trofeo de Campeones de la Superliga Argentina)		League cup (Note: Includes Football League/EFL Cup)		Continental		Other		Total	
Club	Season	Division	Apps	Goals	Apps	Goals	Apps	Goals	Apps	Goals	Apps	Goals	Apps	Goals
Aragua	2006–07	Venezuelan Primera División	21	7	0	0	—		—		—		21	7
Aragua	2007–08	Venezuelan Primera División	28	8	9	3	—		—		—		37	11
Aragua	Total		49	15	9	3	—		—		—		58	18
Las Palmas	2008–09	Segunda División	10	0	0	0	—		—		—		10	0
Las Palmas	2009–10	Segunda División	36	10	1	2	—		—		—		37	12
Las Palmas	Total		46	10	1	2	—		—		—		47	12
Málaga	2010–11	La Liga	30	14	2	2	—		—		—		32	16
Málaga	2011–12	La Liga	37	11	3	0	—		—		—		40	11
Málaga	Total		67	25	5	2	—		—		—		72	27
Rubin Kazan	2012–13	Russian Premier League	25	7	0	0	—		12 (Note: Appearances in UEFA Europa League)	6	—		37	13
Rubin Kazan	2013–14	Russian Premier League	11	6	0	0	—		8	6	—		19	12
Rubin Kazan	Total		36	13	0	0	—		20	12	—		56	25
Zenit Saint Petersburg	2013–14	Russian Premier League	10	7	—		—		2 (Note: Appearances in UEFA Champions League)	1	—		12	8
Zenit Saint Petersburg	2014–15	Russian Premier League	26	13	2	1	—		16 (Note: Ten appearances and three goals in UEFA Champions League, six appearances and three goals in UEFA Europa League)	6	—		44	20
Zenit Saint Petersburg	2015–16	Russian Premier League	1	0	—		—		—		1 (Note: Appearance in Russian Super Cup)	0	2	0
Zenit Saint Petersburg	Total		37	20	2	1	—		18	7	1	0	58	28
West Bromwich Albion	2015–16	Premier League	34	9	5	1	1	0	—		—		40	10
West Bromwich Albion	2016–17	Premier League	37	8	1	0	1	0	—		—		39	8
West Bromwich Albion	2017–18	Premier League	37	7	2	2	2	1	—		—		39	10
West Bromwich Albion	Total		108	24	8	3	4	1	—		—		120	28
Newcastle United (loan)	2018–19	Premier League	32	11	0	0	1	1	—		—		33	12
Dalian Professional	2019	Chinese Super League	11	5	1	0	—		—		—		12	5
Dalian Professional	2020	Chinese Super League	16	9	0	0	—		—		—		16	9
Dalian Professional	Total		27	14	1	0	—		—		—		28	14
CSKA Moscow (loan)	2020–21	Russian Premier League	10	4	3	0	—		—		—		13	4
Everton	2021–22	Premier League	20	1	2	2	1	0	—		—		23	3
Everton	2022–23	Premier League	7	0	0	0	1	0	—		—		8	0
Everton	Total		27	1	2	2	2	0	—		—		31	3
River Plate	2023	Argentine Primera División	31	10	4	0	—		2 (Note: Appearances in Copa Libertadores)	0	—		37	10
Pachuca	2023–24	Liga MX	21	10	—		—		7 (Note: Appearances in CONCACAF Champions Cup)	9	—		28	19
Pachuca	2024–25	Liga MX	33	15	—		—		—		9 (Note: Three appearances and one goal in Leagues Cup, three appearances and one goal in FIFA Intercontinental Cup, three appearances in FIFA Club World Cup)	2	42	17
Pachuca	2025–26	Liga MX	20	5	—		—		—		—		20	5
Pachuca	2026–27	Liga MX	10	10	—		—		0	0	3 (Note: Appearances in Leagues Cup)	0	13	10
Pachuca	Total		84	40	—		—		7	9	12	2	103	51
Oviedo (loan)	2025–26	La Liga	16	2	0	0	—		—		—		16	2
Career total			570	189	35	13	7	2	47	29	12	2	672	234

=== International ===
As of match played on 30 March 2026

Appearances and goals by national team and year
National team	Year	Apps	Goals
Venezuela	2008	3	1
Venezuela	2009	3	1
Venezuela	2010	3	0
Venezuela	2011	11	3
Venezuela	2012	8	5
Venezuela	2013	6	2
Venezuela	2014	2	0
Venezuela	2015	10	2
Venezuela	2016	11	4
Venezuela	2017	9	1
Venezuela	2018	4	2
Venezuela	2019	10	9
Venezuela	2020	2	1
Venezuela	2021	0	0
Venezuela	2022	10	7
Venezuela	2023	10	3
Venezuela	2024	12	4
Venezuela	2025	6	3
Venezuela	2026	2	2
Total		122	50

As of match played on 27 March 2026
Scores and results list Venezuela's goal tally first, score column indicates score after each Rondón goal.

List of international goals scored by Salomón Rondón
No.	Date	Venue	Cap	Opponent	Score	Result	Competition
1	23 March 2008	José Antonio Anzoátegui, Puerto la Cruz, Venezuela	3	El Salvador	1–0	1–0	Friendly
2	11 February 2009	Estadio Monumental, Maturín, Venezuela	4	Guatemala	2–1	2–1	Friendly
3	9 February 2011	José Antonio Anzoátegui, Puerto la Cruz, Venezuela	10	Costa Rica	1–1	2–2	Friendly
4	9 February 2011	José Antonio Anzoátegui, Puerto la Cruz, Venezuela	10	Costa Rica	2–2	2–2	Friendly
5	13 July 2011	Padre Ernesto Martearena, Salta, Argentina	13	Paraguay	1–0	3–3	2011 Copa América
6	24 May 2012	Polideportivo Cachamay, Puerto Ordaz, Venezuela	22	Moldova	2–0	4–0	Friendly
7	24 May 2012	Polideportivo Cachamay, Puerto Ordaz, Venezuela	22	Moldova	4–0	4–0	Friendly
8	2 June 2012	Estadio Centenario, Montevideo, Uruguay	23	Uruguay	1–1	1–1	2014 FIFA World Cup qualification
9	11 September 2012	Defensores del Chaco, Asunción, Paraguay	25	Paraguay	1–0	2–0	2014 FIFA World Cup qualification
10	11 September 2012	Defensores del Chaco, Asunción, Paraguay	25	Paraguay	2–0	2–0	2014 FIFA World Cup qualification
11	26 March 2013	Polideportivo Cachamay, Puerto Ordaz, Venezuela	29	Colombia	1–0	1–0	2014 FIFA World Cup qualification
12	10 September 2013	José Antonio Anzoátegui, Puerto la Cruz, Venezuela	33	Peru	1–1	3–2	2014 FIFA World Cup qualification
13	14 June 2015	El Teniente, Rancagua, Chile	38	Colombia	1–0	1–0	2015 Copa América
14	8 September 2015	Polideportivo Cachamay, Puerto Ordaz, Venezuela	43	Panama	1–1	1–1	Friendly
15	27 May 2016	Estadio Nacional, San José, Costa Rica	48	Costa Rica	1–0	1–2	Friendly
16	1 June 2016	Lockhart Stadium, Fort Lauderdale, United States	49	Guatemala	1–1	1–1	Friendly
17	9 June 2016	Lincoln Financial Field, Philadelphia, United States	51	Uruguay	1–0	1–0	Copa América Centenario
18	18 June 2016	Gillette Stadium, Foxborough, United States	53	Argentina	1–3	1–4	Copa América Centenario
19	28 March 2017	Monumental David Arellano, Santiago, Chile	59	Chile	1–3	1–3	2018 FIFA World Cup qualification
20	11 September 2018	Rommel Fernández, Panama City, Panama	68	Panama	1–0	2–0	Friendly
21	11 September 2018	Rommel Fernández, Panama City, Panama	68	Panama	2–0	2–0	Friendly
22	22 March 2019	Metropolitano Stadium, Madrid, Spain	71	Argentina	1–0	3–1	Friendly
23	9 June 2019	Nippert Stadium, Cincinnati, United States	73	United States	1–0	3–0	Friendly
24	9 June 2019	Nippert Stadium, Cincinnati, United States	73	United States	3–0	3–0	Friendly
25	10 October 2019	Estadio Olímpico, Caracas, Venezuela	78	Bolivia	3–0	4–1	Friendly
26	10 October 2019	Estadio Olímpico, Caracas, Venezuela	78	Bolivia	4–1	4–1	Friendly
27	14 October 2019	Estadio Olímpico, Caracas, Venezuela	79	Trinidad and Tobago	1–0	2–0	Friendly
28	19 November 2019	Panasonic Stadium Suita, Suita, Japan	80	Japan	1–0	4–1	2019 Kirin Challenge Cup
29	19 November 2019	Panasonic Stadium Suita, Suita, Japan	80	Japan	2–0	4–1	2019 Kirin Challenge Cup
30	19 November 2019	Panasonic Stadium Suita, Suita, Japan	80	Japan	3–0	4–1	2019 Kirin Challenge Cup
31	17 November 2020	Estadio Olímpico, Caracas, Venezuela	82	Chile	2–1	2–1	2022 FIFA World Cup qualification
32	28 January 2022	Estadio Agustín Tovar, Barinas, Venezuela	83	Bolivia	1–0	4–1	2022 FIFA World Cup qualification
33	28 January 2022	Estadio Agustín Tovar, Barinas, Venezuela	83	Bolivia	2–0	4–1	2022 FIFA World Cup qualification
34	28 January 2022	Estadio Agustín Tovar, Barinas, Venezuela	83	Bolivia	4–1	4–1	2022 FIFA World Cup qualification
35	1 June 2022	National Stadium, Ta' Qali, Malta	87	Malta	1–0	1–0	Friendly
36	27 September 2022	Stadion Wiener Neustadt, Wiener Neustadt, Austria	90	United Arab Emirates	2–0	4–0	Friendly
37	15 November 2022	Al Hamriya Sports Club Stadium, Al Hamriyah, United Arab Emirates	91	Panama	1–2	2–2	Friendly
38	20 November 2022	Rashid Stadium, Dubai, United Arab Emirates	92	Syria	2–1	2–1	Friendly
39	24 March 2023	Prince Abdullah Al Faisal Stadium, Jeddah, Saudi Arabia	93	Saudi Arabia	2–0	2–1	Friendly
40	12 September 2023	Estadio Monumental, Maturín, Venezuela	98	Paraguay	1–0	1–0	2026 FIFA World Cup qualification
41	17 October 2023	Estadio Monumental, Maturín, Venezuela	100	Chile	2–0	3–0	2026 FIFA World Cup qualification
42	26 June 2024	SoFi Stadium, Inglewood, United States	106	Mexico	1–0	1–0	2024 Copa América
43	30 June 2024	Q2 Stadium, Austin, United States	107	Jamaica	2–0	3–0	2024 Copa América
44	5 July 2024	AT&T Stadium, Arlington, United States	108	Canada	1–1	1–1 (3–4 p)	2024 Copa América
45	10 October 2024	Estadio Monumental, Maturín, Venezuela	111	Argentina	1–1	1–1	2026 FIFA World Cup qualification
46	25 March 2025	Estadio Monumental, Maturín, Venezuela	116	Peru	1–0	1–0	2026 FIFA World Cup qualification
47	6 June 2025	Estadio Monumental, Maturín, Venezuela	117	Bolivia	2–0	2–0	2026 FIFA World Cup qualification
48	9 September 2025	Estadio Monumental, Maturín, Venezuela	120	Colombia	3–5	3–6	2026 FIFA World Cup qualification
49	27 March 2026	Pakhtakor Stadium, Tashkent, Uzbekistan	121	Trinidad and Tobago	3–1	4–1	2026 FIFA Series
50	27 March 2026	Pakhtakor Stadium, Tashkent, Uzbekistan	121	Trinidad and Tobago	4–1	4–1	2026 FIFA Series

== Honours ==
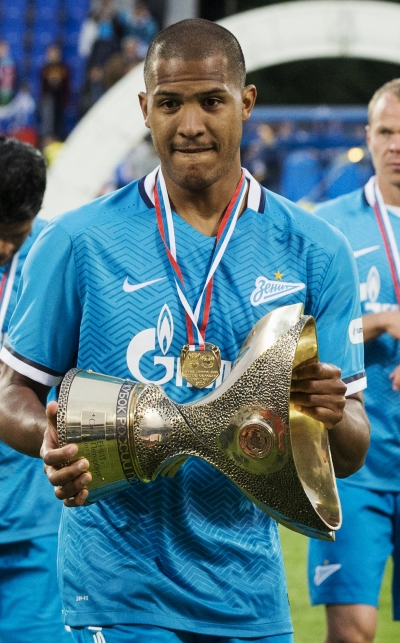
Rondón holding the Russian Super Cup after Zenit's victory in 2015

Aragua

- Copa Venezuela: 2007–08

Zenit Saint Petersburg

- Russian Premier League: 2014–15
- Russian Super Cup: 2015

River Plate

- Argentine Primera División: 2023

Pachuca

- CONCACAF Champions Cup: 2024
- FIFA Derby of the Americas: 2024
- FIFA Challenger Cup: 2024
- FIFA Intercontinental Cup runner-up: 2024

Venezuela

- Kirin Cup: 2019
- FIFA Series runner-up: 2026

Individual

- Newcastle United Player of the Year: 2019
- Liga MX top scorer: Clausura 2024 (shared)
- CONCACAF Champions Cup Golden Ball: 2024
- CONCACAF Champions Cup top scorer: 2024
- CONCACAF Champions Cup Best XI: 2024
- IFFHS Top 11 Copa América: 2024
- Liga MX All-Star: 2024, 2026

== See also ==
- List of top international men's football goalscorers by country
- List of men's footballers with 100 or more international caps
- List of men's footballers with 50 or more international goals
