= Carlos Moreno (footballer, born 1998) =

Mexican footballer

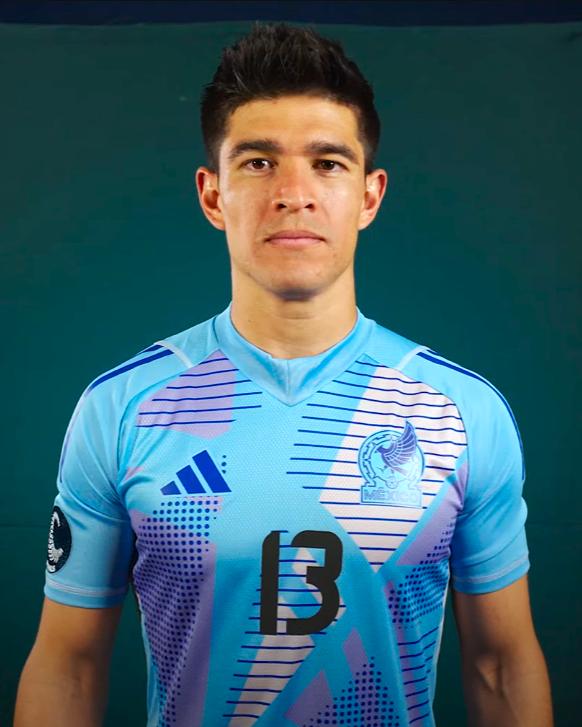
- Moreno with Mexico in 2025

Personal information
- Full name: Carlos Agustín Moreno Luna
- Date of birth: 29 January 1998 (age 28)
- Place of birth: Tecomán, Colima, Mexico
- Height: 1.90 m (6 ft 3 in)
- Position: Goalkeeper

Team information
- Current team: Pachuca
- Number: 25

Youth career
- 2010–2018: Pachuca

Senior career*
Years	Team	Apps	(Gls)
2018–	Pachuca	132	(1)
2018–2019	→ Everton (loan)	1	(0)
Medal record
Men's football
Representing Mexico
CONCACAF Nations League
Winner	2025 United States
Olympic Qualifying Championship
Winner	2020 Mexico
- * Club domestic league appearances and goals as of 21 November 2026

Carlos Agustín Moreno Luna (born 29 January 1998) is a Mexican professional footballer who plays as a goalkeeper for Liga MX club Pachuca.

== Club career ==
A youth product of Pachuca since the age of 10, Moreno joined the Chilean club Everton on loan in 2018. He made his senior debut with Everton in a 0–0 Copa Chile tie with Cobresal on 10 June 2018. He scored his first career goal in the last minutes of their game against Atlético San Luis.

== International career ==
Moreno was called up as the third goalkeeper at the 2020 CONCACAF Men's Olympic Qualifying Championship, where Mexico won the competition.

== Career statistics ==
=== Club ===
As of match played on 21 November 2026

Appearances and goals by club, season and competition
Club	Season	League			Cup (Note: Includes Copa MX and Copa Chile)		Continental		Global		Other		Total	
Club	Season	Division	Apps	Goals	Apps	Goals	Apps	Goals	Apps	Goals	Apps	Goals	Apps	Goals
Pachuca	2019–20	Liga MX	—		2	0	—		—		—		2	0
Pachuca	2020–21	Liga MX	2	0	—		—		—		—		2	0
Pachuca	2021–22	Liga MX	2	0	—		—		—		—		2	0
Pachuca	2022–23	Liga MX	4	0	—		—		—		—		4	0
Pachuca	2023–24	Liga MX	33	0	—		7 (Note: Appearances in CONCACAF Champions Cup)	0	—		1 (Note: Appearances in Leagues Cup)	0	41	0
Pachuca	2024–25	Liga MX	35	0	—		—		3 (Note: Appearances in FIFA Intercontinental Cup)	0	3	0	41	0
Pachuca	2025–26	Liga MX	39	0	—		—		2 (Note: Appearances in FIFA Club World Cup)	0	4	0	43	0
Pachuca	2026–27	Liga MX	17	1	—		—		—		3	0	20	1
Pachuca	Total		132	1	2	0	7	0	5	0	11	0	157	1
Everton (loan)	2018	Chilean Primera División	—		2	0	—		—		—		2	0
Everton (loan)	2019	Chilean Primera División	1	0	—		—		—		—		1	0
Everton (loan)	Total		1	0	2	0	—		—		—		3	0
Career total			133	1	4	0	7	0	5	0	11	0	160	1

== Honours ==
Pachuca

- Liga MX: Apertura 2022
- CONCACAF Champions Cup: 2024
- FIFA Intercontinental Cup runner-up: 2024

Mexico U23

- CONCACAF Olympic Qualifying Championship: 2020

Mexico

- CONCACAF Nations League: 2024–25

Individual

- Liga MX All-Star: 2026
