= Faber Gil =

Colombian footballer (born 1995)

Personal information
- Full name: Faber Andrés Gil Mosquera
- Date of birth: 14 March 1995 (age 31)
- Place of birth: El Bagre, Antioquia Department, Colombia
- Height: 1.81 m (5 ft 11 in)
- Position: Winger

Team information
- Current team: Atlético Bucaramanga (on loan from Deportivo Pereira)
- Number: 17

Youth career
- Envigado

Senior career*
Years	Team	Apps	(Gls)
2014–2016	Envigado	3	(0)
2018–2019	Deportivo Árabe Unido	24	(2)
2019–2023	Leones	31	(6)
2021	→ Atlético Huila (loan)	29	(3)
2022	→ La Equidad (loan)	23	(0)
2023	→ Atlético Huila (loan)	37	(1)
2024–	Deportivo Pereira	25	(7)
2024	→ Pachuca (loan)	9	(0)
2025–	→ Atlético Nacional (loan)	13	(0)
2025–	→ Atlético Bucaramanga (loan)	22	(2)
- * Club domestic league appearances and goals as of 11 December 2025

Faber Andrés Gil Mosquera (born 20 July 1996) is a Colombian footballer who plays as a winger for Liga Betplay club Atlético Bucaramanga, on loan from Deportivo Pereira.

== Career ==
Gil made his debut for Envigado on 20 August 2014 against Águilas Doradas in the Copa Colombia, coming on as a substitute in the 75th minute for Juan Camilo Zapata.

In 2018, he moved to Panama to sign for Deportivo Árabe Unido where he played in the CONCACAF Champions Cup, scoring a bicycle kick in the quarter-finals against El Salvadoran side FAS.

After a season in Panama he returned to Colombia to sign for Leones in the Categoría Primera B. In 2021, he joined Atlético Huila on loan. He embarked on several more loan spells, first with La Equidad before returning to Atlético Huila in 2023.

On 9 December 2023, Gil was announced as the new signing of Deportivo Pereira. On 27 August 2024, he again left Colombia to join Liga MX club Pachuca on loan for a year with an option to buy. After his loan at Pachuca was terminated early in January 2025, Gil signed for Atlético Nacional on loan for a year with an option to buy.

== Career statistics ==
As of 21 February 2025

Appearances and goals by club, season and competition
Club	Season	League			Cup		Continental (Note: Includes CONCACAF League and Copa Sudamericana)		Other (Note: Includes FIFA Intercontinental Cup)		Total	
Club	Season	Division	Apps	Goals	Apps	Goals	Apps	Goals	Apps	Goals	Apps	Goals
Envigado	2014	Categoría Primera A	0	0	2	0	—		—		2	0
Envigado	2016	Categoría Primera A	3	0	3	0	—		—		6	0
Deportivo Árabe Unido	2018–19	Liga Panameña de Fútbol	24	2	0	0	6	2	—		30	4
Leones	2019	Categoría Primera B	14	3	0	0	—		—		14	3
Leones	2020	Categoría Primera B	17	3	1	0	—		—		18	3
Leones	Total		31	6	1	0	0	0	0	0	32	6
Atlético Huila (loan)	2021	Categoría Primera A	10	0	0	0	—		—		10	0
Atlético Huila (loan)	2021	Categoría Primera B	19	3	0	0	—		—		19	3
Atlético Huila (loan)	Total		29	3	0	0	0	0	0	0	29	3
La Equidad (loan)	2022	Categoría Primera A	23	0	0	0	2	0	—		25	0
Atlético Huila (loan)	2023	Categoría Primera A	37	1	0	0	—		—		37	1
Deportivo Pereira	2024	Categoría Primera A	25	7	0	0	—		—		25	7
Pachuca (loan)	2024–25	Liga MX	9	0	0	0	—		1	0	10	0
Atlético Nacional (loan)	2025	Categoría Primera A	4	0	0	0	—		—		4	0
Career total			185	19	6	0	8	2	1	0	200	8
