= 2026 FIFA Intercontinental Cup =

3rd edition of the FIFA Intercontinental Cup

Tournament details
- Host country: Final stages: Qatar
- Dates: 26 August – 16 December
- Teams: 6 (from 6 confederations)
- Venues: 4 (in 3 host cities)

Tournament statistics
- Matches played: 2
- Goals scored: 4 (2 per match)
- Attendance: 76,146 (38,073 per match)
- Top scorer(s): (Portugal) Nuno Santos (Mamelodi Sundowns); 2 goals
- All statistics correct as of 19 September 2026.

The 2026 FIFA Intercontinental Cup is the third edition of the FIFA Intercontinental Cup, an annual club association football tournament organised by FIFA. The tournament comprises the six teams that won the previous edition of the continental championships in each FIFA confederation, playing each other in a single-elimination bracket.

The tournament broadly maintains the format of the previous annual versions of the FIFA Club World Cup, which was expanded and reorganised into a quadrennial tournament with more entrants, with the exception of changes to venues for the initial rounds.

Paris Saint-Germain are the defending champions, having won their first FIFA Intercontinental Cup title in 2025.

== Format ==
The details were approved by the FIFA Council on 17 December 2023, with the format formally confirmed on 20 September 2024.

- First round: The winners of the 2025–26 AFC Champions League Elite (Note: As per the rotation policy between AFC and CAF.) played the winners of the 2026 OFC Professional League in the "FIFA African–Asian–Pacific Cup play-off".
- Second round: The winners of the 2025–26 CAF Champions League play the winners of the first round for the title of the "FIFA African–Asian–Pacific Cup". The match is hosted by the club from the country with the higher ranking in the FIFA Men's World Ranking. In parallel, the winners of the 2026 Copa Libertadores and the winners of the 2026 CONCACAF Champions Cup play each other at a neutral venue in a match that was denominated the "FIFA Derby of the Americas".
- Play-off: The winners of the second round matches play each other in the "FIFA Challenger Cup".
- Final: The winners of the play-off (FIFA Challenger Cup) play the winners of the 2025–26 UEFA Champions League.

== Venues ==
Saudi Arabia	South Africa	Qatar	
Jeddah	Pretoria	Al Rayyan	
King Abdullah Sports City	Loftus Versfeld Stadium	Jassim bin Hamad Stadium	Ahmad bin Ali Stadium
Capacity: 62,345	Capacity: 51,762	Capacity: 15,000	Capacity: 45,032
Location of the host city of the 2026 FIFA Intercontinental Cup in Saudi Arabia.	Location of the host city of the 2026 FIFA Intercontinental Cup in South Africa.	Location of the host city of the 2026 FIFA Intercontinental Cup in Qatar.	

== Qualified teams ==
Location of the teams participating in the 2026 FIFA Intercontinental Cup.

Team	Confederation	Qualification	Qualified date	Participation
Entering in the final
(France) Paris Saint-Germain	UEFA	Winners of the 2025–26 UEFA Champions League	30 May 2026	2nd (Previous: 2025)
Entering in the second round
(South Africa) Mamelodi Sundowns	CAF	Winners of the 2025–26 CAF Champions League	24 May 2026	1st
(Mexico) Toluca	CONCACAF	Winners of the 2026 CONCACAF Champions Cup	30 May 2026	1st
	CONMEBOL	Winners of the 2026 Copa Libertadores	28 November 2026	1st
Entering in the first round
(Saudi Arabia) Al-Ahli	AFC	Winners of the 2025–26 AFC Champions League Elite	25 April 2026	2nd (Previous: 2025)
(New Zealand) Auckland FC	OFC	Winners of the 2026 OFC Professional League	20 May 2026	1st

== Matches ==
If a match is tied after normal playing time, 30 minutes of extra time will be played. If still tied after extra time, a penalty shoot-out will be held to determine the winner.

=== Bracket ===
Derby of the Americas	Challenger Cup	Intercontinental Cup
9 December – Al Rayyan	16 December – Al Rayyan
CONMEBOL representative	(France) Paris Saint-Germain
12 December – Al Rayyan
(Mexico) Toluca	Winners of Challenger Cup
Winner Match 3
African–Asian–Pacific Cup play-off	African–Asian–Pacific Cup	(South Africa) Mamelodi Sundowns
19 September – Pretoria
26 August – Jeddah	(South Africa) Mamelodi Sundowns	2
(Saudi Arabia) Al-Ahli	1	(Saudi Arabia) Al-Ahli	1
(New Zealand) Auckland FC	0

=== First round ===
African–Asian–Pacific Cup play-off
26 August 2026
21:00 AST

Al-Ahli (Saudi Arabia)	1–0	(New Zealand) Auckland FC
Abu Al-Shamat 63'	Report

King Abdullah Sports City, Jeddah
Attendance: 46,628
Referee: Amin Omar (Egypt)

=== Second round ===
African–Asian–Pacific Cup
19 September 2026
15:00 SAST

Mamelodi Sundowns (South Africa)	2–1	(Saudi Arabia) Al-Ahli
Santos 17', 80'	Report	Williams 19' (o.g.)

Loftus Versfeld Stadium, Pretoria
Attendance: 29,518
Referee: Sandro Schärer (Switzerland)

Derby of the Americas
9 December 2026
20:00 AST

CONMEBOL representative	Match 3	(Mexico) Toluca
	Report

Jassim bin Hamad Stadium, Al Rayyan

=== Play-off ===
Challenger Cup
12 December 2026
20:00 AST

Winner Match 3	Match 4	(South Africa) Mamelodi Sundowns
	Report

Jassim bin Hamad Stadium, Al Rayyan

== Goalscorers ==
As of 19 September 2026

Rank	Player	Team	Goals
1	(Portugal) Nuno Santos	(South Africa) Mamelodi Sundowns	2
2	(Saudi Arabia) Saleh Abu Al-Shamat	(Saudi Arabia) Al-Ahli	1

== Trophies awarded ==
Multiple trophies were awarded to winning teams in the competition. In addition to an updated trophy given to the winners of the Intercontinental Cup final, trophies were awarded to the winning teams of the African–Asian–Pacific Cup (contested by the AFC, CAF and OFC representatives), Derby of the Americas (contested by the CONCACAF and CONMEBOL representatives) and Challenger Cup (contested by the winners of the two aforementioned matches). These trophies were similar to each other, but with different coloured globes.

- Intercontinental Cup:
- Challenger Cup:
- Derby of the Americas:
- African–Asian–Pacific Cup: (South Africa) Mamelodi Sundowns

== See also ==
- 2027 FIFA Women's Champions Cup
