= Elías Montiel =

Mexican footballer

Personal information
- Full name: Elías Enrique Montiel Ávalos
- Date of birth: 7 October 2005 (age 21)
- Place of birth: Tula de Allende, Hidalgo, Mexico
- Height: 1.71 m (5 ft 7 in)
- Position: Midfielder

Team information
- Current team: Atlas
- Number: 18

Youth career
- 2019–2023: Pachuca

Senior career*
Years	Team	Apps	(Gls)
2023–2026	Pachuca	82	(5)
2026–	Atlas	9	(1)

International career^{‡}
2023	Mexico U18	3	(0)
2024–	Mexico U20	10	(0)
Medal record
Men's football
Representing Mexico
CONCACAF U-20 Championship
Winner	2024 Mexico
- * Club domestic league appearances and goals as of 20 November 2026 ‡ National team caps and goals as of 11 October 2025

Elías Enrique Montiel Ávalos (born 7 October 2005) is a Mexican professional footballer who plays as a midfielder for Liga MX club Atlas.

== Club career ==
Montiel joined Pachuca’s academy, progressing through all of their youth categories before breaking into the first team. He made his professional debut on July 10, 2023, coming off the bench in a league match against León. At the 2024 FIFA Intercontinental Cup, he distinguished himself by winning the Bronze Ball award.

In September 2026, Montiel was transferred to Atlas.

== International career ==
In November 2023, Montiel was first called up to the Mexico U18s for a set of friendlies. He was part of the Mexico U20 squad that won the 2024 CONCACAF U-20 Championship. He was part of the provisional 60-man squad list for the senior Mexico national team for the 2025 CONCACAF Nations League Finals.

In 2025, Montiel was called up by coach Eduardo Arce to represent Mexico at the FIFA U-20 World Cup held in Chile.

== Career statistics ==
=== Club ===
As of match played on 20 November 2026

Club	Season	League			Cup		Continental		Global		Other		Total	
Club	Season	Division	Apps	Goals	Apps	Goals	Apps	Goals	Apps	Goals	Apps	Goals	Apps	Goals
Pachuca	2023–24	Liga MX	23	0	—		6 (Note: Appearances in CONCACAF Champions Cup)	0	—		1 (Note: Appearances in Leagues Cup)	0	30	0
Pachuca	2024–25	Liga MX	30	2	—		—		3 (Note: Appearances in FIFA Intercontinental Cup)	0	1	0	34	2
Pachuca	2025–26	Liga MX	20	2	—		—		3 (Note: Appearances in FIFA Club World Cup)	1	4	1	27	4
Pachuca	2026–27	Liga MX	7	1	—		—		—		3	0	10	1
Pachuca	Total		82	5	—		6	0	6	1	9	1	103	7
Atlas	2026–27	Liga MX	9	1	—		—		—		—		9	1
Career total			91	6	0	0	6	0	6	1	9	1	112	8

== Honours ==
Pachuca

- CONCACAF Champions Cup: 2024
- FIFA Derby of the Americas: 2024
- FIFA Challenger Cup: 2024
- FIFA Intercontinental Cup runner-up: 2024

Mexico U20

- CONCACAF U-20 Championship: 2024

Individual

- FIFA Intercontinental Cup Bronze Ball: 2024
- CONCACAF U-20 Championship Best XI: 2024
- IFFHS CONCACAF Youth (U20) Best XI: 2024, 2025
- Liga MX All-Stars: 2025, 2026
