= 2024 FIFA Intercontinental Cup =

1st edition of the FIFA Intercontinental Cup

Tournament details
- Host country: Final stages: Qatar
- Dates: 22 September – 18 December
- Teams: 6 (from 6 confederations)
- Venues: 4 (in 4 host cities)

Final positions
- Champions: (Spain) Real Madrid (1st title)
- Runners-up: (Mexico) Pachuca

Tournament statistics
- Matches played: 5
- Goals scored: 17 (3.4 per match)
- Attendance: 183,775 (36,755 per match)
- Top scorer(s): (Morocco) Soufiane Rahimi (Al Ain); 2 goals
- Best player: (Brazil) Vinícius Júnior (Real Madrid)
- Fair play award: (Spain) Real Madrid

The 2024 FIFA Intercontinental Cup (officially known as the FIFA Intercontinental Cup Qatar 2024 presented by Aramco for sponsorship reasons) was the inaugural edition of the FIFA Intercontinental Cup, an annual club association football tournament organised by FIFA. The tournament comprised the six teams that won the previous edition of the continental championships in each FIFA confederation, playing each other in a single-elimination bracket. It was held from 22 September to 18 December 2024. The first two games were played in the stadium of a team involved in each match, and the final three (including the final) were played in Qatar as a neutral venue.

The tournament broadly maintains the format of the previous annual versions of the FIFA Club World Cup, which was expanded and reorganised into a quadrennial tournament with more entrants, with the exception of changes to venues for the initial rounds.

== Format ==
The details were approved by the FIFA Council on 17 December 2023, with the format formally confirmed on 20 September 2024.

- First round: The winners of the 2023–24 AFC Champions League (Note: A draw determined whether the winners of the 2023–24 AFC Champions League or the 2023–24 CAF Champions League would play in the first round. Consequently, the other team entered in the second round.) hosted the winners of the 2024 OFC Champions League in the "FIFA African–Asian–Pacific Cup play-off".
- Second round: The winners of the 2023–24 CAF Champions League hosted the winners of the first round for the title of the "FIFA African–Asian–Pacific Cup". In parallel, the winners of the 2024 Copa Libertadores and the winners of the 2024 CONCACAF Champions Cup played each other in Doha, Qatar, in a match that will be denominated the "FIFA Derby of the Americas".
- Play-off: The winners of the second round matches played each other in Doha, Qatar in the "FIFA Challenger Cup".
- Final: The winners of the play-off (FIFA Challenger Cup) played the winners of the 2023–24 UEFA Champions League in Lusail, Qatar.

== Venues ==
United Arab Emirates	Egypt	Qatar	
Al Ain	Cairo	Doha	Lusail (Doha Area)
Hazza bin Zayed Stadium	Cairo International Stadium	Stadium 974	Lusail Stadium
Capacity: 25,053	Capacity: 75,000	Capacity: 44,089	Capacity: 88,966
Location of the host city of the 2024 FIFA Intercontinental Cup in the United Arab Emirates.	Location of the host city of the 2024 FIFA Intercontinental Cup in Egypt.	Location of the host cities of the 2024 FIFA Intercontinental Cup in Qatar.	

== Qualified teams ==
Location of the teams participating in the 2024 FIFA Intercontinental Cup.

Team	Confederation	Qualification	Qualified date
Entering in the final
(Spain) Real Madrid	UEFA	Winners of the 2023–24 UEFA Champions League	1 June 2024
Entering in the second round
(Egypt) Al Ahly	CAF	Winners of the 2023–24 CAF Champions League	25 May 2024
(Mexico) Pachuca	CONCACAF	Winners of the 2024 CONCACAF Champions Cup	1 June 2024
(Brazil) Botafogo	CONMEBOL	Winners of the 2024 Copa Libertadores	30 November 2024
Entering in the first round
(United Arab Emirates) Al Ain	AFC	Winners of the 2023–24 AFC Champions League	25 May 2024
(New Zealand) Auckland City	OFC	Winners of the 2024 OFC Champions League	24 May 2024

== Matches ==
The match schedule was confirmed on 26 August 2024. If a match was tied after normal playing time, extra time was played. If still tied after extra time, a penalty shoot-out was held to determine the winners.

=== Bracket ===
Derby of the Americas	Challenger Cup	Intercontinental Cup
11 December – Doha	18 December – Lusail
(Brazil) Botafogo	0	(Spain) Real Madrid	3
14 December – Doha
(Mexico) Pachuca	3	(Mexico) Pachuca	0
(Mexico) Pachuca (p)	0 (6)
African–Asian–Pacific Cup play-off	African–Asian–Pacific Cup	(Egypt) Al Ahly	0 (5)
29 October – Cairo
22 September – Al Ain	(Egypt) Al Ahly	3
(United Arab Emirates) Al Ain	6	(United Arab Emirates) Al Ain	0
(New Zealand) Auckland City	2

=== First round ===
African–Asian–Pacific Cup play-off
22 September 2024
20:00 GST

Al Ain (United Arab Emirates)	6–2	(New Zealand) Auckland City
Cardoso 6'; Gassama 11'; Palacios 45+1'; Rahimi 78', 90+4'; Kaku 90+2'	Report	Lagos 43'; Bevan 54'

Hazza bin Zayed Stadium, Al Ain
Attendance: 13,826
Referee: Mustapha Ghorbal (Algeria)

=== Second round ===
African–Asian–Pacific Cup
29 October 2024
20:00 EGY

Al Ahly (Egypt)	3–0	(United Arab Emirates) Al Ain
Abou Ali 32'; Ashour 55'; Magdy 90+2' (pen.)	Report

Cairo International Stadium, Cairo
Attendance: 51,602
Referee: Halil Umut Meler (Turkey)

Derby of the Americas
11 December 2024
20:00 AST

Botafogo (Brazil)	0–3	(Mexico) Pachuca
	Report	Idrissi 50'; Deossa 66'; Rondón 80'

Stadium 974, Doha
Attendance: 12,257
Referee: Danny Makkelie (Netherlands)

=== Play-off ===
Challenger Cup
14 December 2024
20:00 AST

Pachuca (Mexico)	0–0 (a.e.t.)	(Egypt) Al Ahly
	Report
Penalties
Rondón (penalty missed); Bastón (penalty missed); Cabral (penalty scored); Idrissi (penalty scored); Deossa (penalty scored); Montiel (penalty scored); Rodríguez (penalty scored); Gil (penalty scored)	6–5	(penalty scored) Magdy; (penalty scored) Rabia; (penalty scored) Attia; (penalty missed) Kahraba; (penalty missed) Kamal; (penalty scored) El Solia; (penalty scored) Tau; (penalty missed) Abdelfattah

Stadium 974, Doha
Attendance: 38,841
Referee: Alireza Faghani (Australia)

=== Final ===
18 December 2024
20:00 AST

Real Madrid (Spain)	3–0	(Mexico) Pachuca
Mbappé 37'; Rodrygo 53'; Vinícius 84' (pen.)	Report

Lusail Stadium, Lusail
Attendance: 67,249
Referee: Jesús Valenzuela (Venezuela)

== Goalscorers ==
Rank	Player	Team	Goals
1	(Morocco) Soufiane Rahimi	(United Arab Emirates) Al Ain	2
2	(Palestine) Wessam Abou Ali	(Egypt) Al Ahly	1
2	(Egypt) Emam Ashour	(Egypt) Al Ahly	1
2	(New Zealand) Myer Bevan	(New Zealand) Auckland City	1
2	(Portugal) Fábio Cardoso	(United Arab Emirates) Al Ain	1
2	(Colombia) Nelson Deossa	(Mexico) Pachuca	1
2	(Mali) Sékou Gassama	(United Arab Emirates) Al Ain	1
2	(Morocco) Oussama Idrissi	(Mexico) Pachuca	1
2	(Paraguay) Kaku	(United Arab Emirates) Al Ain	1
2	(Colombia) Jerson Lagos	(New Zealand) Auckland City	1
2	(Egypt) Mohamed Magdy	(Egypt) Al Ahly	1
2	(France) Kylian Mbappé	(Spain) Real Madrid	1
2	(Argentina) Matías Palacios	(United Arab Emirates) Al Ain	1
2	(Brazil) Rodrygo	(Spain) Real Madrid	1
2	(Venezuela) Salomón Rondón	(Mexico) Pachuca	1
2	(Brazil) Vinícius Júnior	(Spain) Real Madrid	1

== Awards ==
The following awards were given at the conclusion of the tournament. Vinícius Júnior of Real Madrid won the Golden Ball award, sponsored by Adidas, which was jointly awarded with the Aramco Player of the Tournament to recognise the best player of the Intercontinental Cup.

Adidas Golden Ball Aramco Player of the Tournament	Adidas Silver Ball	Adidas Bronze Ball
(Brazil) Vinícius Júnior (Real Madrid)	(Uruguay) Federico Valverde (Real Madrid)	(Mexico) Elías Montiel (Pachuca)

== Trophies awarded ==
For the first time, multiple trophies were awarded to winning teams in the competition. In addition to an updated trophy given to the winners of the Intercontinental Cup final, trophies were awarded to the winning teams of the African–Asian–Pacific Cup (contested by the AFC, CAF and OFC representatives), Derby of the Americas (contested by the CONCACAF and CONMEBOL representatives) and Challenger Cup (contested by the winners of the two aforementioned matches). These trophies are similar to each other, but with different coloured globes.

- Intercontinental Cup: (Spain) Real Madrid
- Challenger Cup: (Mexico) Pachuca
- Derby of the Americas: (Mexico) Pachuca
- African–Asian–Pacific Cup: (Egypt) Al Ahly
