= FIFA Intercontinental Cup =

Association football tournament for clubs

- Organiser(s): FIFA
- Founded: 2024; 2 years ago
- Region: International
- Teams: 6
- Related competitions: FIFA Club World Cup
- Current champions: (France) Paris Saint-Germain (1st title)
- Most championships: (France) Paris Saint-Germain (Spain) Real Madrid (1 title each)
- Website: fifa.com/intercontinentalcup
- 2026 FIFA Intercontinental Cup

The FIFA Intercontinental Cup is an annual football competition organised by FIFA, the global governing body for the sport. First held in 2024, the tournament features the reigning club champions of each of the six FIFA confederations, contested in a knockout format in which the representative from Europe receives a bye to the final.

The tournament concept is closely modelled on the earlier version of the FIFA Club World Cup, which underwent major expansion and restructuring starting with the 2025 edition. The FIFA Intercontinental Cup confers the title of annual world champions. Paris Saint-Germain are the current holders, having defeated Flamengo 2–1 on penalties following a 1–1 draw after extra time in the 2025 final.

== History ==
On 16 December 2022, the FIFA Council approved the expansion of the FIFA Club World Cup from seven to 32 teams beginning in 2025. The 2023 tournament was therefore the last played under the previous format. However, FIFA reported that confederations expressed the need for the champions of their top club competitions to still play each other annually to "stimulate competitiveness". Therefore, on 14 March 2023, the FIFA Council approved a concept for an annual club competition beginning in 2024, later named as the FIFA Intercontinental Cup. FIFA considers this tournament to be a direct continuation of the FIFA Club World Cup, held from 2000 to 2023.

The similarly named Intercontinental Cup (1960–2004) was a club competition organised by UEFA and CONMEBOL which was usually contested by the champions of the two respective confederations. However, the new FIFA-organised competition features the champions of the top club competitions of the six confederations, namely the AFC Champions League Elite, CAF Champions League, CONCACAF Champions Cup, Copa Libertadores, OFC Professional League (Note: The 2024 and 2025 editions of the competition featured the winner of the OFC Men's Champions League instead of the OFC Professional League.) and UEFA Champions League, and it retains the world title of the preceding FIFA Club World Cup.

The inaugural edition of the tournament took place from September to December 2024, with the final stages played in Qatar.

== Format ==
The competition features a series of intercontinental play-offs between clubs from all confederations except UEFA, whose club receives a bye to the final. If a match is tied after normal playing time, extra time is played. If still tied after extra time, a penalty shoot-out is held to determine the winner.

- First round: An OFC representative plays alternately against an AFC or CAF representative. The match, denominated as the "FIFA African–Asian–Pacific Cup play-off", is hosted by a club from a higher-ranked country in the FIFA Men's World Rankings.
- Second round: The other AFC/CAF representative (which received a bye) faces the winner of the first round in a match denominated the "FIFA African–Asian–Pacific Cup", hosted by a club from a higher-ranked country in the FIFA Rankings. Elsewhere, the CONMEBOL and CONCACAF representatives face off at a neutral venue in a match dubbed the "FIFA Derby of the Americas".
- Play-off: The two second-round winners meet at a neutral venue in a match denominated the "FIFA Challenger Cup".
- Final: The winners of the play-off face a UEFA representative at a neutral venue in a match denominated the "FIFA Intercontinental Cup" to determine the champions.

=== Bracket ===
Derby of the Americas	Challenger Cup	Intercontinental Cup Final
Hosted at neutral venue	Hosted at neutral venue
CONMEBOL representative	UEFA representative
Hosted at neutral venue
CONCACAF representative	Challenger Cup winner
Derby of the Americas winner
African–Asian–Pacific Cup play-off	African–Asian–Pacific Cup	African–Asian–Pacific Cup winner
Hosted by higher-ranked team
Hosted by higher-ranked team	AFC or CAF representative
AFC or CAF representative	Play-off winner
OFC representative

== Trophies ==
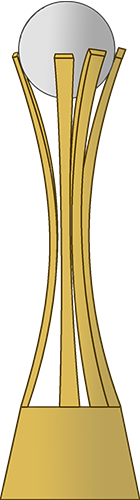
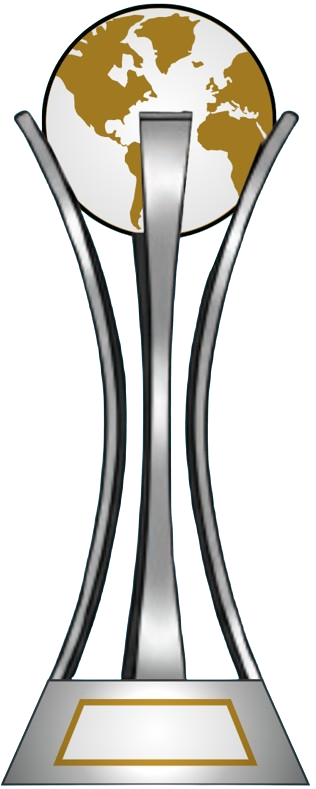
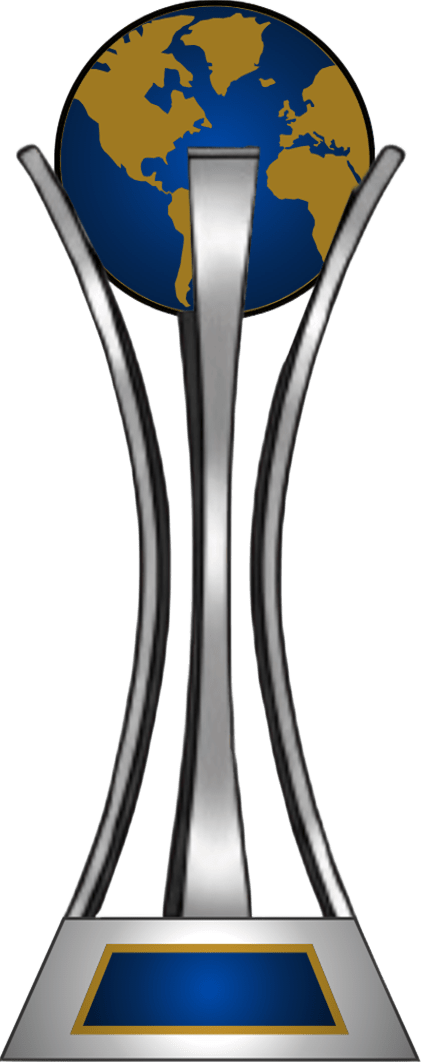
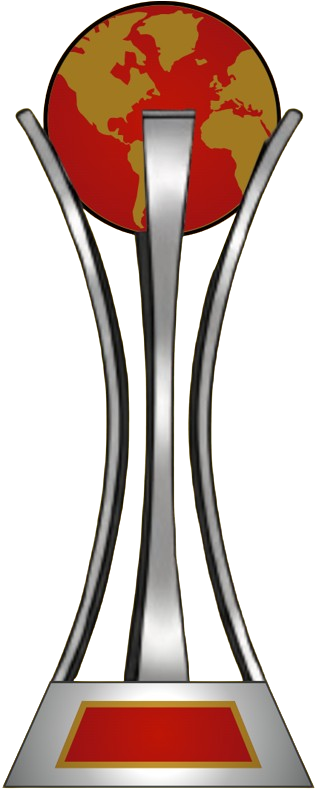
The FIFA Intercontinental Cup trophy (golden colour), which has undergone slight changes compared to the old FIFA Club World Cup trophy presented from 2005 to 2023, and the three secondary intercontinental trophies: the Challenger Cup (white colour), the Derby of the Americas (blue colour) and the African–Asian–Pacific Cup (red colour).

The FIFA Intercontinental Cup trophy is similar in design to the FIFA Club World Cup trophy used from 2005 to 2023. It features a circular base with six pillars extending upward from it, supporting a globe shaped like a football. The trophy is gold in colour and has a plaque on the base with the name and year of the tournament, which means a new trophy will be commissioned every year. The base is taller than the said Club World Cup trophy.

The three trophies for the earlier rounds of the tournament resemble smaller versions of the main FIFA Intercontinental Cup trophy. The trophies are primarily silver and feature four pillars supporting the globe at the top. The bases' heights are similar to that on the 2005–2023 Club World Cup trophy. The trophies are identical to each other aside from the plaque on the base which says the name of each cup, and the accent colour: red for the African–Asian–Pacific Cup, blue for the Derby of the Americas, and white for the Challenger Cup.

The winners of the competition are also entitled to receive the FIFA Champions Badge; it features an image of the trophy, which the reigning champion is entitled to display on its first-team kit only, up until and including, the final of the next championship.

== Results ==
=== Finals ===
List of FIFA Intercontinental Cup finals
Year	Winners		Score	Runners-up		Venue	Location	Attendance
Year	Country	Club	Score	Club	Country	Venue	Location	Attendance
2024	Spain	Real Madrid	3–0	Pachuca	Mexico	Lusail Stadium	Lusail, Qatar	67,249
2025	France	Paris Saint-Germain	1–1 (a.e.t.) (2–1 p)	Flamengo	Brazil	Ahmad bin Ali Stadium	Al Rayyan, Qatar	42,150
2026						Jassim bin Hamad Stadium	Al Rayyan, Qatar	

=== Secondary trophy winners ===
In addition to the final, trophies are awarded to the winning teams of the African–Asian–Pacific Cup (contested by the AFC, CAF and OFC representatives), Derby of the Americas (contested by the CONCACAF and CONMEBOL representatives) and Challenger Cup (contested by the winners of the two aforementioned matches).

List of FIFA Intercontinental Cup secondary trophy winners
Year	Challenger Cup	Derby of the Americas	African–Asian–Pacific Cup
2024	(Mexico) Pachuca	(Mexico) Pachuca	(Egypt) Al Ahly
2025	(Brazil) Flamengo	(Brazil) Flamengo	(Egypt) Pyramids
2026			(South Africa) Mamelodi Sundowns

== Awards ==
List of FIFA Intercontinental Cup Awards winners
Year	Golden Ball Player of the Tournament	Silver Ball	Bronze Ball
2024	(Brazil) Vinícius Júnior (Real Madrid)	(Uruguay) Federico Valverde (Real Madrid)	(Mexico) Elías Montiel (Pachuca)
2025	(Portugal) Vitinha (Paris Saint-Germain)	Not awarded	

== See also ==
- FIFA Women's Champions Cup
