= 2019–20 Atlético Madrid season =

89th season in existence of Atlético Madrid

Atlético Madrid
2019–20 season
- President: Enrique Cerezo
- Head coach: Diego Simeone
- Stadium: Wanda Metropolitano
- La Liga: 3rd
- Copa del Rey: Round of 32
- Supercopa de España: Runners-up
- UEFA Champions League: Quarter-finals
- Top goalscorer: League: Álvaro Morata (12); All: Álvaro Morata (16)
- Highest home attendance: 67,942 (vs Real Madrid, 28 September 2019)
- Lowest home attendance: 45,944 (vs Osasuna, 14 December 2019)
- Average home league attendance: 58,063
Home colours	Away colours	Third colours

The 2019–20 season was Atlético Madrid's 89th season since foundation in 1903 and the club's 83rd season in La Liga, the top league of Spanish football. Atlético competed in La Liga, Copa del Rey, Supercopa de España and UEFA Champions League.

The season was the first for the club since 2013–14 without Antoine Griezmann, who joined FC Barcelona in the summer of 2019 (although he return two-seasons later on a loan and later permanently).

== Kits ==
Home	Home alt.	Home 2020-21	Away	Away alt. 1	Away alt. 2	Third	Third alt.

Goalkeeper 1	Goalkeeper 2	Goalkeeper 3	Goalkeeper 2020-21

== Players ==
N	Pos.	Nat.	Name	Age	EU	Since	App	Goals	Ends	Transfer fee	Notes
1	GK	(Spain)	Antonio Adán	33	EU	2018	1	0	2020	€1M	
2	DF	(Uruguay)	José Giménez (3rd captain)	25	EU	2013	134	6	2023	€0.9M	Second nationality: (Spain)
4	DF	(Colombia)	Santiago Arias	28	Non-EU	2018	25	1	2023	€11M	
5	MF	(Ghana)	Thomas Partey	27	Non-EU	2013	97	9	2023	Academy	
6	MF	(Spain)	Koke (captain)	28	EU	2009	374	34	2024	Academy	
7	FW	(Portugal)	João Félix	20	EU	2019	1	0	2027	€127.2M	
8	MF	(Spain)	Saúl (4th captain)	25	EU	2012	204	28	2026	Academy	
9	FW	(Spain)	Álvaro Morata	27	EU	2019	15	6	2020	Free	Loan
10	FW	(Argentina)	Ángel Correa	25	EU	2014	178	30	2024	€7.5M	Second nationality: (Spain)
11	MF	(France)	Thomas Lemar	24	EU	2018	31	2	2024	€70M	
12	DF	(Brazil)	Renan Lodi	22	EU	2019	0	0	2026	€25M	
13	GK	(Slovenia)	Jan Oblak (vice-captain)	27	EU	2014	162	0	2021	€16M	
14	MF	(Spain)	Marcos Llorente	25	EU	2019	0	0	2024	€30M	
15	DF	(Montenegro)	Stefan Savić	29	Non-EU	2015	110	1	2020	€25M	
16	MF	(Mexico)	Héctor Herrera	30	EU	2019	0	0	2022	Free	Second nationality: (Portugal)
17	FW	(Serbia)	Ivan Šaponjić	23	Non-EU	2019	0	0	2022	€0.9M	
18	DF	(Brazil)	Felipe	31	Non-EU	2019	0	0	2022	€20M	
19	FW	(Spain)	Diego Costa	31	EU	2007–2009; 2010–2014; 2018	158	71	2022	€65M	Second nationality: (Brazil)
20	MF	(Spain)	Vitolo	30	EU	2017	23	3	2022	€35.7M	
21	MF	(Belgium)	Yannick Carrasco	26	EU	2015–2018; 2020–	123	23	2020		Loan
22	DF	(Spain)	Mario Hermoso	25	EU	2019	0	0	2025	€25M	
23	DF	(England)	Kieran Trippier	29	Non-EU	2019	1	0	2022	€20M	
24	DF	(Croatia)	Šime Vrsaljko	28	EU	2016	54	1	2021	€16M	

- Source: Atlético Madrid
- Ordered by squad number.

== Transfers ==
=== In ===
No.	Pos.	Nat.	Name	Age	EU	Moving from	Type	Transfer window	Ends	Transfer fee	Source
–	GK	(Portugal)	André Moreira	23	EU	(Portugal) Feirense	Loan return	Summer			
–	GK	(Argentina)	Axel Werner	23	EU	Málaga	Loan return	Summer			
–	MF	(Portugal)	Gelson Martins	24	EU	(France) Monaco	Loan return	Summer			
–	MF	(Ghana)	Bernard Mensah	24	Non-EU	(Turkey) Kayserispor	Loan return	Summer			
–	FW	(Argentina)	Luciano Vietto	25	EU	(England) Fulham	Loan return	Summer			
–	MF	(Spain)	Roberto Olabe	23	EU	Extremadura	Loan return	Summer			
–	MF	(Spain)	Héctor Hernández	23	EU	Rayo Majadahonda	Loan return	Summer			
–	FW	(Argentina)	Nicolás Ibáñez	24	Non-EU	(Mexico) Atlético San Luis	Transfer	Summer		Undisclosed	Atlético Madrid
24	DF	(Croatia)	Šime Vrsaljko	27	EU	(Italy) Internazionale	Loan return	Summer			
14	MF	(Spain)	Marcos Llorente	24	EU	Real Madrid	Transfer	Summer	2024	€40M	Atlético Madrid
18	DF	(Brazil)	Felipe	30	Non-EU	(Portugal) Porto	Transfer	Summer	2022	€20M	Atlético Madrid
16	MF	(Mexico)	Héctor Herrera	29	EU	(Portugal) Porto	Transfer	Summer	2022	Free	Atlético Madrid
7	FW	(Portugal)	João Félix	19	EU	(Portugal) Benfica	Transfer	Summer	2027	€126M	Atlético Madrid
12	DF	(Brazil)	Renan Lodi	21	Non-EU	(Brazil) Athletico Paranaense	Transfer	Summer	2026	€20M	Atlético Madrid
17	FW	(Serbia)	Ivan Šaponjić	21	Non-EU	(Portugal) Benfica	Transfer	Summer	2022	€8M	Atlético Madrid
23	DF	(England)	Kieran Trippier	28	EU	(England) Tottenham Hotspur	Transfer	Summer	2022	€22M	Atlético Madrid
22	CB	(Spain)	Mario Hermoso	24	EU	Espanyol	Transfer	Summer	2024	€25M	Atlético Madrid
–	MF	(Brazil)	Caio Henrique	22	Non-EU	(Brazil) Fluminense	Loan return	Winter			
21	MF	(Belgium)	Yannick Carrasco	26	EU	(China) Dalian Professional	Loan	Winter	2020	Undisclosed	Atlético Madrid
–	MF	(Brazil)	Caio Henrique	22	Non-EU	(Brazil) Grêmio	Loan return	Winter			

▼ Total Spending: €261M

=== Out ===
No.	Pos.	Nat.	Name	Age	EU	Moving to	Type	Transfer window	Transfer fee	Source
2	DF	(Uruguay)	Diego Godín	40	EU	(Italy) Internazionale	Transfer	Summer	Free	Atlético Madrid
3	DF	(Brazil)	Filipe Luís	41	EU	(Brazil) Flamengo	Transfer	Summer	Free	Flamengo
20	DF	(Spain)	Juanfran	34	EU	(Brazil) São Paulo	Transfer	Summer	Free	Sao Paulo
21	DF	(France)	Lucas Hernandez	23	EU	(Germany) Bayern Munich	Transfer	Summer	€80M	Bayern Munich
–	MF	(Argentina)	Luciano Vietto	25	EU	(Portugal) Sporting CP	Transfer	Summer	€7.5M	Sporting CP
–	MF	(Portugal)	Gelson Martins	24	EU	(France) Monaco	Transfer	Summer	€30M	Atlético Madrid
–	MF	(Ghana)	Bernard Mensah	24	Non-EU	(Turkey) Kayserispor	Transfer	Summer	Undisclosed	
–	GK	(Argentina)	Axel Werner	23	Non-EU	(Mexico) Atlético San Luis	Loan	Summer		Atlético Madrid
–	FW	(Argentina)	Nicolás Ibáñez	24	Non-EU	(Mexico) Atlético San Luis	Loan	Summer		Atlético Madrid
14	MF	(Spain)	Rodri	23	EU	(England) Manchester City	Transfer	Summer	€70M	Atlético Madrid
–	MF	(Spain)	Roberto Olabe	23	EU	Eibar	Transfer	Summer	Undisclosed	Eibar
–	FW	(Spain)	Joaquín Muñoz	20	EU	Huesca	Transfer	Summer	Undisclosed	Huesca
–	DF	(Argentina)	Nehuén Pérez	19	Non-EU	(Portugal) Famalicão	Loan	Summer		Atlético Madrid
7	FW	(France)	Antoine Griezmann	28	EU	Barcelona	Transfer	Summer	€120M	Barcelona
–	GK	(Portugal)	André Moreira	23	EU	(Portugal) Belenenses SAD	Transfer	Summer	Free	
–	GK	(Spain)	Héctor Hernández	23	EU	Fuenlabrada	Loan	Summer	Free	CF Fuenlabrada
21	FW	(Croatia)	Nikola Kalinić	31	EU	(Italy) Roma	Loan	Summer	Free	Atlético Madrid
–	MF	(Brazil)	Caio Henrique	22	Non-EU	(Brazil) Grêmio	Loan	Winter	Free	

▲ Total Income: €307.5M

Net Income: ▲€46.5M

== Pre-season and friendlies ==
=== Summer ===
Win Draw Loss

20 July 2019 1	Numancia	0–3	Atlético Madrid	Burgo de Osma
19:00 CEST (UTC+2)		Report	Vitolo 69'; Šaponjić 77'; Felipe 83'	Stadium: Campo Municipal de Deportes

24 July 2019 2	Guadalajara	0–0 (4–5 p)	Atlético Madrid	Arlington, United States
03:00 CEST (UTC+2)	Villalpando (yellow card) 15'; Villanueva (yellow card) 55' (yellow-red card) 61'	Report	Costa (yellow card) 15'; Llorente (red card) 24'; Moya (yellow card) 74'; Adán (yellow card) 90+4'	Stadium: Globe Life Park in Arlington; Attendance: 12,467; Referee: Baldomero Toledo (United States)
	Penalties
	Ponce (penalty scored); Briseño (penalty scored); González (penalty scored); Huerta (penalty scored); Beltrán (penalty missed); Cervantes (penalty missed)		(penalty scored) Correa; (penalty scored) Herrera; (penalty missed) Šaponjić; (penalty scored) Felipe; (penalty scored) Moya; (penalty scored) Sanabria

27 July 2019 3	Real Madrid	3–7	Atlético Madrid	East Rutherford, United States
02:00 CEST (UTC+2)	Isco (yellow card) 31'; Nacho 59', (yellow card) 88'; Carvajal (red card) 65'; Benzema 85' (pen.); Hernández 89'	Report	Costa 1', 28', 45' (pen.), 51', (red card) 65'; Félix 8'; Correa 19'; Saúl (yellow card) 65'; Vitolo 70'	Stadium: MetLife Stadium; Attendance: 57,714; Referee: Ted Unkel (United States)

1 August 2019 4	MLS All-Stars	0–3	Atlético Madrid	Orlando, United States
02:30 CEST (UTC+2)		Report	Llorente 43'; Félix 85'; Costa 90+3'	Stadium: Exploria Stadium; Attendance: 25,527; Referee: Drew Fischer (Canada)

3 August 2019 5	Atlético San Luis	1–2	Atlético Madrid	San Luis Potosí, Mexico
19:00 CEST (UTC+2)	Ibáñez 11'	Report	Saúl (yellow card) 33'; Camello 71'; Portales 84' (o.g.); Sánchez (yellow card) 90'	Stadium: Estadio Alfonso Lastras

10 August 2019 6	Atlético Madrid	2–1	Juventus	Stockholm, Sweden
18:00 CEST (UTC+2)	Lemar 24'; Félix 33'; Vitolo (yellow card) 69'; Correa (yellow card) 83'	Report	Khedira 29'	Stadium: Friends Arena; Attendance: 49,752; Referee: Andreas Ekberg (Sweden)

== Competitions ==
Win Draw Loss

=== Overview ===
Competition	First match	Last match	Starting round	Final position	Record							
Competition	First match	Last match	Starting round	Final position	Pld	W	D	L	GF	GA	GD	Win %
La Liga	18 August 2019	19 July 2020	Matchday 1	3rd	38	18	16	4	51	27	+24	47.37
Copa del Rey	23 January 2020		Round of 32	Round of 32	1	0	0	1	1	2	−1	0.00
Supercopa de España	8 January 2020	12 January 2020	Semi-finals	Runners-up	2	1	1	0	3	2	+1	50.00
Champions League	18 September 2019	13 August 2020	Group stage	Quarter-finals	9	5	1	3	13	9	+4	55.56
Total					50	24	18	8	68	40	+28	48.00

Last updated: 13 August 2020
Source: Soccerway

=== La Liga ===
==== League table ====
Pos	Team	Pld	W	D	L	GF	GA	GD	Pts	Qualification or relegation
1	Real Madrid (C)	38	26	9	3	70	25	+45	87	Qualification for the Champions League group stage
2	Barcelona	38	25	7	6	86	38	+48	82	Qualification for the Champions League group stage
3	Atlético Madrid	38	18	16	4	51	27	+24	70	Qualification for the Champions League group stage
4	Sevilla	38	19	13	6	54	34	+20	70	Qualification for the Champions League group stage
5	Villarreal	38	18	6	14	63	49	+14	60	Qualification for the Europa League group stage

Source: La Liga, Soccerway
Rules for classification: 1) Points; 2) Head-to-head points; 3) Head-to-head goal difference; 4) Goal difference; 5) Goals scored; 6) Fair-play points (Note: Head-to-head record is used only after all the matches between the teams in question have been played)
(C) Champions

==== Results summary ====
Overall								Home						Away					
Pld	W	D	L	GF	GA	GD	Pts	W	D	L	GF	GA	GD	W	D	L	GF	GA	GD
38	18	16	4	51	27	+24	70	12	6	1	28	11	+17	6	10	3	23	16	+7

Last updated: 19 July 2020.
Source: La Liga

==== Results by round ====
Round	1	2	3	4	5	6	7	8	9	10	11	12	13	14	15	16	17	18	19	20	21	22	23	24	25	26	27	28	29	30	31	32	33	34	35	36	37	38
Ground	H	A	H	A	H	A	H	A	H	H	A	A	H	A	H	A	H	A	H	A	H	A	H	A	H	A	H	A	A	H	A	H	A	H	A	H	A	H
Result	W	W	W	L	D	W	D	D	D	W	D	D	W	D	L	D	W	W	W	L	D	L	W	D	W	D	D	D	W	W	W	W	D	W	D	W	W	D
Position	6	2	1	2	6	3	3	3	5	5	4	4	3	4	6	7	5	4	3	3	5	6	4	4	4	5	6	6	4	3	3	3	3	3	3	3	3	3

Updated to match(es) played on 19 July 2020. Source: La Liga
A = Away; H = Home; W = Win; D = Draw; L = Loss

==== Matches ====
The La Liga schedule was announced on 4 July 2019.

18 August 2019 1	Atlético Madrid	1–0	Getafe	Madrid
22:00 CEST (UTC+2)	Morata 23'; Lodi (yellow card) 41' (yellow-red card) 42'; Saúl (yellow card) 81'	Report	Cabrera (yellow card) 17'; Molina (red card) 38'; Fajr (yellow card) 49'; Nyom (yellow card) 77'; Ángel (yellow card) 90+3'	Stadium: Wanda Metropolitano; Attendance: 55,099; Referee: Guillermo Cuadra Fernández

25 August 2019 2	Leganés	0–1	Atlético Madrid	Leganés
19:00 CEST (UTC+2)	Eraso (yellow card) 23'; Rosales (yellow card) 34'; Silva (yellow card) 73'; En-Nesyri (yellow card) 90'	Report	Hermoso (yellow card) 52'; Partey (yellow card) 62'; Vitolo 71', (yellow card) 86'; Llorente (yellow card) 73'; Koke (yellow card) 90+1'	Stadium: Estadio Municipal de Butarque; Attendance: 11,742; Referee: Ricardo de Burgos Bengoetxea

1 September 2019 3	Atlético Madrid	3–2	Eibar	Madrid
19:00 CEST (UTC+2)	Félix 27'; Vitolo 52'; Partey 90'	Report	Inui (yellow card) 4'; Charles 7'; Orellana (yellow card) 15'; Arbilla 19'; Dmitrović (yellow card) 69'	Stadium: Wanda Metropolitano; Attendance: 56,664; Referee: Santiago Jaime Latre

14 September 2019 4	Real Sociedad	2–0	Atlético Madrid	San Sebastián
18:30 CEST (UTC+2)	Zubeldia (yellow card) 45'; Ødegaard 58'; Monreal 61'	Report	Trippier (yellow card) 51'; Llorente (yellow card) 60'; Costa (yellow card) 69'	Stadium: Anoeta; Attendance: 33,374; Referee: Antonio Mateu Lahoz

21 September 2019 5	Atlético Madrid	0–0	Celta Vigo	Madrid
18:30 CEST (UTC+2)	Koke (yellow card) 76'; Saúl (yellow card) 81'; Costa (yellow card) 90+6'	Report	Aidoo (yellow card) 45+2'; Aspas (yellow card) 63'; Blanco (yellow card) 77'; Diop (yellow card) 90+1'; Olaza (yellow card) 90+6'	Stadium: Wanda Metropolitano; Attendance: 57,701; Referee: Mario Melero López

25 September 2019 6	Mallorca	0–2	Atlético Madrid	Palma
19:00 CEST (UTC+2)	Baba (yellow card) 5'; Budimir (yellow card) 7'; Campos (yellow card) 77'	Report	Savić (yellow card) 13'; Costa 26'; Felipe (yellow card) 55'; Félix 65'; Morata (yellow card) 77' (yellow-red card) 78'; Correa (yellow card) 86'	Stadium: Estadi de Son Moix; Attendance: 19,348; Referee: Alejandro Hernández Hernández

28 September 2019 7	Atlético Madrid	0–0	Real Madrid	Madrid
21:00 CEST (UTC+2)	Partey (yellow card) 90+3'	Report	Nacho (yellow card) 22'; Varane (yellow card) 69'	Stadium: Wanda Metropolitano; Attendance: 67,942; Referee: José Luis González González

6 October 2019 8	Valladolid	0–0	Atlético Madrid	Valladolid
16:00 CEST (UTC+2)	Nacho (yellow card) 2'; Toni (yellow card) 10'; Moyano (yellow card) 29'; Plano (yellow card) 48'; Joaquín (yellow card) 52'; Rubio (yellow card) 75'	Report	Morata (yellow card) 25'; Saúl (yellow card) 45+2'; Félix (yellow card) 60'; Lemar (yellow card) 89'	Stadium: Estadio José Zorrilla; Attendance: 23,680; Referee: José María Sánchez Martínez

19 October 2019 9	Atlético Madrid	1–1	Valencia	Madrid
16:00 CEST (UTC+2)	Partey (yellow card) 29'; Costa 36' (pen.); Félix (yellow card) 44'	Report	Cheryshev (yellow card) 39'; Parejo 82'; Lee (red card) 90+1'	Stadium: Wanda Metropolitano; Attendance: 61,603; Referee: Adrián Cordero Vega

26 October 2019 10	Atlético Madrid	2–0	Athletic Bilbao	Madrid
21:00 CEST (UTC+2)	Saúl 28', (yellow card) 42'; Correa (yellow card) 44'; Morata 64'	Report	R. García (yellow card) 72'; Simón (yellow card) 83'	Stadium: Wanda Metropolitano; Attendance: 59,211; Referee: Alejandro Hernández Hernández

29 October 2019 11	Alavés	1–1	Atlético Madrid	Vitoria-Gasteiz
19:00 CET (UTC+1)	Wakaso (yellow card) 29'; Laguardia (yellow card) 61'; Pérez 83'; García (yellow card) 89'	Report	Llorente (yellow card) 16'; Morata 70'; Felipe (yellow card) 75'; Hermoso (yellow card) 89'	Stadium: Mendizorrotza Stadium; Attendance: 17,235; Referee: Xavier Estrada Fernández

2 November 2019 12	Sevilla	1–1	Atlético Madrid	Seville
18:30 CET (UTC+1)	Vázquez 28', (yellow card) 39'; Torres (yellow card) 40'; Jordán (yellow card) 79'; Gudelj (yellow card) 87'	Report	Lodi (yellow card) 27'; Partey (yellow card) 34'; Morata 60'; Correa (yellow card) 80'	Stadium: Ramón Sánchez Pizjuán; Attendance: 39,957; Referee: José Luis González González

10 November 2019 13	Atlético Madrid	3–1	Espanyol	Madrid
16:00 CET (UTC+1)	Correa 45+1'; Morata 58'; Saúl (yellow card) 60'; Partey (yellow card) 85'; Koke 90+2'	Report	Darder 38'; Naldo (yellow card) 45+4'; Campuzano (yellow card) 65'	Stadium: Wanda Metropolitano; Attendance: 53,069; Referee: Jesús Gil Manzano

23 November 2019 14	Granada	1–1	Atlético Madrid	Granada
18:30 CET (UTC+1)	Soldado (yellow card) 31'; Montoro (yellow card) 43'; Puertas (yellow card) 54'; Gonalons (yellow card) 63'; Germán 67'	Report	Correa (yellow card) 28'; Felipe (yellow card) 39'; Lodi 60'; Llorente (yellow card) 66'	Stadium: Nuevo Estadio de Los Cármenes; Attendance: 17,040; Referee: David Medié Jiménez

1 December 2019 15	Atlético Madrid	0–1	Barcelona	Madrid
21:00 CET (UTC+1)	Partey (yellow card) 8'; Correa (yellow card) 21'; Vitolo (yellow card) 69'; Felipe (yellow card) 73'	Report	Junior (yellow card) 18'; Piqué (yellow card) 32'; Rakitić (yellow card) 51'; Lenglet (yellow card) 65'; Messi 86'	Stadium: Wanda Metropolitano; Attendance: 64,226; Referee: Antonio Mateu Lahoz

6 December 2019 16	Villarreal	0–0	Atlético Madrid	Villarreal
21:00 CET (UTC+1)	Zambo Anguissa (yellow card) 38'; Trigueros (yellow card) 74'	Report	Morata (yellow card) 15'	Stadium: Estadio de la Cerámica; Attendance: 17,964; Referee: Alejandro Hernández Hernández

14 December 2019 17	Atlético Madrid	2–0	Osasuna	Madrid
21:00 CET (UTC+1)	Sánchez (yellow card) 26'; Morata 67'; Saúl 75'	Report	Herrera (yellow card) 53'	Stadium: Wanda Metropolitano; Attendance: 45,944; Referee: José Luis Munuera Montero

22 December 2019 18	Real Betis	1–2	Atlético Madrid	Seville
16:00 CET (UTC+1)	Mandi (yellow card) 51'; Bartra (yellow card) 80', (goal) 90+3'	Report	Félix (yellow card) 42'; Partey (yellow card) 55'; Correa 58'; Morata (yellow card) 67', (goal) 84'	Stadium: Benito Villamarín; Attendance: 52,017; Referee: Xavier Estrada Fernández

4 January 2020 19	Atlético Madrid	2–1	Levante	Madrid
18:30 CET (UTC+1)	Correa 13'; Felipe 18'; Partey (yellow card) 27'	Report	Roger 16'; Rochina (yellow card) 43'; Cabaco (yellow card) 52'; Vukčević (yellow card) 90+1'	Stadium: Wanda Metropolitano; Attendance: 59,084; Referee: Ricardo de Burgos Bengoetxea

18 January 2020 20	Eibar	2–0	Atlético Madrid	Eibar
21:00 CET (UTC+1)	Burgos 10', (yellow card) 62'; Expósito 90'	Report	Saúl (yellow card) 59'; Savić (yellow card) 85'	Stadium: Ipurua Municipal Stadium; Attendance: 6,429; Referee: Jesús Gil Manzano

26 January 2020 21	Atlético Madrid	0–0	Leganés	Madrid
12:00 CET (UTC+1)	Savić (yellow card) 90+6'	Report	Awaziem (yellow card) 11'; Eraso (yellow card) 54'; Cuéllar (yellow card) 77' (yellow-red card) 90+4'; Mesa (yellow card) 90'; Recio (yellow card) 90+2'	Stadium: Wanda Metropolitano; Attendance: 52,767; Referee: Antonio Mateu Lahoz

1 February 2020 22	Real Madrid	1–0	Atlético Madrid	Madrid
16:00 CET (UTC+1)	Benzema 56'; Mendy (yellow card) 84'; Casemiro (yellow card) 88'	Report	Felipe (yellow card) 66'; Vrsaljko (yellow card) 80'	Stadium: Santiago Bernabéu; Attendance: 77,223; Referee: Xavier Estrada Fernández

8 February 2020 23	Atlético Madrid	1–0	Granada	Madrid
21:00 CET (UTC+1)	Correa 6'; Koke (yellow card) 28'; Partey (yellow card) 68'; Vrsaljko (yellow card) 69'; Vitolo (yellow card) 86'	Report	Herrera (yellow card) 26'; Soldado (yellow card) 27'; Foulquier (yellow card) 36'; Duarte (yellow card) 84'; Díaz (yellow card) 88'; Köybaşı (yellow card) 90+1'	Stadium: Wanda Metropolitano; Attendance: 54,113; Referee: César Soto Grado

14 February 2020 24	Valencia	2–2	Atlético Madrid	Valencia
21:00 CET (UTC+1)	Gabriel 40', (yellow card) 55'; Kondogbia 59'; Mangala (yellow card) 67'; Gómez (yellow card) 79'	Report	Llorente 15'; Lodi (yellow card) 26'; Partey 43'; Vrsaljko (yellow card) 58'	Stadium: Mestalla; Attendance: 42,297; Referee: David Medié Jiménez

23 February 2020 25	Atlético Madrid	3–1	Villarreal	Madrid
21:00 CET (UTC+1)	Correa 40'; Saúl (yellow card) 61'; Koke 64'; Félix 74', (yellow card) 90'	Report	Alcácer 16'; Peña (yellow card) 25'	Stadium: Wanda Metropolitano; Attendance: 54,166; Referee: Ricardo de Burgos Bengoetxea

1 March 2020 26	Espanyol	1–1	Atlético Madrid	Cornellà de Llobregat
16:00 CET (UTC+1)	Savić 24' (o.g.); Embarba (yellow card) 38'; Sánchez (yellow card) 90'; López (yellow card) 90+2'	Report	Felipe (yellow card) 6'; Partey (yellow card) 42'; Saúl 46'; Koke (yellow card) 86'; Lodi (yellow card) 90'	Stadium: RCDE Stadium; Attendance: 28,872; Referee: Javier Alberola Rojas

7 March 2020 27	Atlético Madrid	2–2	Sevilla	Madrid
16:00 CET (UTC+1)	Morata 32' (pen.); Félix 36', (yellow card) 73'; Trippier (yellow card) 77'	Report	De Jong 19'; Diego Carlos (yellow card) 31'; Navas (yellow card) 43'; Ocampos 43' (pen.); Banega (yellow card) 45+1'; Gudelj (yellow card) 56'	Stadium: Wanda Metropolitano; Attendance: 60,374; Referee: Alejandro Hernández Hernández

14 June 2020 28	Athletic Bilbao	1–1	Atlético Madrid	Bilbao
14:00 CEST (UTC+2)	Muniain (yellow card) 6', (goal) 37'; Williams (yellow card) 45+1'; Martínez (yellow card) 84'	Report	Costa 39'	Stadium: San Mamés Stadium; Attendance: 0 Referee: José Luis González González
Note: The match was originally scheduled for 15 March, but was postponed due to the COVID-19 pandemic, and rescheduled to 14 June. It was played behind closed doors.

17 June 2020 29	Osasuna	0–5	Atlético Madrid	Pamplona
22:00 CEST (UTC+2)	Arnaiz (yellow card) 58'; Gallego (yellow card) 73'; Pérez (yellow card) 85'	Report	Arias (yellow card) 6'; Félix 27', 56', (yellow card) 45+2'; Savić (yellow card) 45+3'; Llorente 79'; Morata 84'; Carrasco 88'	Stadium: El Sadar Stadium; Attendance: 0 Referee: Ricardo de Burgos Bengoetxea
Note: The match was originally scheduled for 20 March, but was postponed due to the 2020 coronavirus pandemic, and rescheduled to 17 June. It was played behind closed doors.

20 June 2020 30	Atlético Madrid	1–0	Valladolid	Madrid
22:00 CEST (UTC+2)	Partey (yellow card) 57'; Hermoso (yellow card) 59'; Carrasco (yellow card) 69'; Costa (yellow card) 75'; Vitolo 81'	Report	Rubio (yellow card) 64'; Míchel (yellow card) 88'	Stadium: Wanda Metropolitano; Attendance: 0 Referee: Pablo González Fuertes
Note: The match was originally scheduled for 5 April, but was postponed due to the 2020 coronavirus pandemic, and rescheduled to 20 June. It was played behind closed doors.

23 June 2020 31	Levante	0–1	Atlético Madrid	La Nucia
19:30 CEST (UTC+2)	Coke (yellow card) 27'; Vukčević (yellow card) 50'; Morales (yellow card) 81'; Toño (yellow card) 90+2'	Report	Bruno 15' (o.g.); Saúl (yellow card) 69'; Morata (yellow card) 90+2'	Stadium: Camilo Cano; Attendance: 0 Referee: José Luis Munuera Montero
Note: The match was originally scheduled for 12 April, but was postponed due to the 2020 coronavirus pandemic, and rescheduled to 23 June. It was played behind closed doors.

27 June 2020 32	Atlético Madrid	2–1	Alavés	Madrid
22:00 CEST (UTC+2)	Partey (yellow card) 40'; Saúl 59'; Costa 73' (pen.); Savić (yellow card) 75'; Koke (yellow card) 90+2'	Report	Pons (yellow card) 45'; Marín (yellow card) 58'; Joselu 90+3' (pen.)	Stadium: Wanda Metropolitano; Attendance: 0 Referee: Mario Melero López
Note: The match was originally scheduled for 22 April, but was postponed due to the 2020 coronavirus pandemic, and rescheduled to 27 June. It was played behind closed doors.

30 June 2020 33	Barcelona	2–2	Atlético Madrid	Barcelona
22:00 CEST (UTC+2)	Costa 11' (o.g.); Ter Stegen (yellow card) 17'; Piqué (yellow card) 18'; Messi 50' (pen.), (yellow card) 61'	Report	Saúl 19' (pen.), 62' (pen.), (yellow card) 35'; Felipe (yellow card) 51'; Costa (yellow card) 75'; Carrasco (yellow card) 80'; Lemar (yellow card) 90+4'	Stadium: Camp Nou; Attendance: 0 Referee: Alejandro Hernández Hernández
Note: The match was originally scheduled for 26 April, but was postponed due to the 2020 coronavirus pandemic, and rescheduled to 30 June. It was played behind closed doors.

3 July 2020 34	Atlético Madrid	3–0	Mallorca	Madrid
22:00 CEST (UTC+2)	Morata 29' (pen.), 45+4'; Saúl (yellow card) 44'; Costa (yellow card) 68'; Koke 79'	Report	Sedlar (yellow card) 26'	Stadium: Wanda Metropolitano; Attendance: 0 Referee: Javier Alberola Rojas
Note: The match was originally scheduled for 3 May, but was postponed due to the 2020 coronavirus pandemic, and rescheduled to 3 July. It was played behind closed doors.

7 July 2020 35	Celta Vigo	1–1	Atlético Madrid	Vigo
22:00 CEST (UTC+2)	Méndez (yellow card) 22'; Nolito (yellow card) 41'; Jorge (yellow card) 47'; Beltrán 49'; Murillo (yellow card) 51'	Report	Morata 1'; Lodi (yellow card) 23'; Giménez (yellow card) 79'; Herrera (yellow card) 90+4'	Stadium: Balaídos; Attendance: 0 Referee: José María Sánchez Martínez
Note: The match was originally scheduled for 10 May, but was postponed due to the 2020 coronavirus pandemic, and rescheduled to 7 July. It was played behind closed doors.

11 July 2020 36	Atlético Madrid	1–0	Real Betis	Madrid
22:00 CEST (UTC+2)	Savić (yellow card) 11'; Hermoso (red card) 57'; Costa 74'	Report	Barragán (yellow card) 45+1'; Feddal (yellow card) 80'; Emerson (yellow card) 90+3'	Stadium: Wanda Metropolitano; Attendance: 0 Referee: José Luis González González
Note: The match was originally scheduled for 13 May, but was postponed due to the 2020 coronavirus pandemic, and rescheduled to 11 July. It was played behind closed doors.

16 July 2020 37	Getafe	0–2	Atlético Madrid	Getafe
21:00 CEST (UTC+2)	Molina (yellow card) 68'; Nyom (red card) 90+2'	Report	Giménez (yellow card) 45+4'; Llorente 54'; Saúl (yellow card) 64'; Partey 80'	Stadium: Coliseum Alfonso Pérez; Attendance: 0 Referee: Antonio Mateu Lahoz
Note: The match was originally scheduled for 17 May, but was postponed due to the 2020 coronavirus pandemic, and rescheduled to 16 July. It was played behind closed doors.

19 July 2020 38	Atlético Madrid	1–1	Real Sociedad	Madrid
21:00 CEST (UTC+2)	Koke 30'; Partey (yellow card) 45+3'	Report	Gorosabel (yellow card) 18'; Januzaj 87'; Monreal (yellow card) 90'	Stadium: Wanda Metropolitano; Attendance: 0 Referee: Pablo González Fuertes
Note: The match was originally scheduled for 24 May, but was postponed due to the 2020 coronavirus pandemic, and rescheduled to 19 July. It was played behind closed doors.

=== Copa del Rey ===
23 January 2020 Round of 32	Cultural Leonesa	2–1 (a.e.t.)	Atlético Madrid	León
21:00 CET (UTC+1)	Galvan (yellow card) 37'; Luque (yellow card) 40'; Dioni (yellow card) 74'; Martínez (yellow card) 81'; Castañeda 83'; Benito 108'; Marcos (yellow card) 117'	Report	Llorente (yellow card) 43'; Correa 62'; Saúl (yellow card) 74'	Stadium: Reino de León; Attendance: 12,252; Referee: Javier Alberola Rojas

=== Supercopa de España ===
9 January 2020 Semi-finals	Barcelona	2–3	Atlético Madrid	Jeddah, Saudi Arabia
22:00 AST (UTC+3)	Piqué (yellow card) 15'; Suárez (yellow card) 45+3'; Messi 51'; Griezmann 62'; Vidal (yellow card) 77'; Neto (yellow card) 80'	Report	Partey (yellow card) 35'; Savić (yellow card) 45+3'; Koke 46'; Felipe (yellow card) 64'; Llorente (yellow card) 72'; Morata 81' (pen.); Correa 86'	Stadium: King Abdullah Sports City; Attendance: 58,410; Referee: José Luis González González

12 January 2020 Final	Real Madrid	0–0 (a.e.t.) (4–1 p)	Atlético Madrid	Jeddah, Saudi Arabia
21:00 AST (UTC+3)	Mendy (yellow card) 90+2'; Modrić (yellow card) 90+3'; Valverde (yellow card) 111', (red card) 115'; Carvajal (yellow card) 115'	Report	Felipe (yellow card) 27'; Partey (yellow card) 74'; Correa (yellow card) 115'; Savić (yellow card) 115'	Stadium: King Abdullah Sports City; Attendance: 59,053; Referee: José María Sánchez Martínez
	Penalties
	Carvajal (penalty scored); Rodrygo (penalty scored); Modrić (penalty scored); Ramos (penalty scored)		(penalty missed) Saúl; (penalty missed) Partey; (penalty scored) Trippier

=== UEFA Champions League ===
==== Group stage ====
Pos	Team	Pld	W	D	L	GF	GA	GD	Pts	Qualification	JUV	ATM	LEV	LMO
1	(Italy) Juventus	6	5	1	0	12	4	+8	16	Advance to knockout phase	—	1–0	3–0	2–1
2	(Spain) Atlético Madrid	6	3	1	2	8	5	+3	10	Advance to knockout phase	2–2	—	1–0	2–0
3	(Germany) Bayer Leverkusen	6	2	0	4	5	9	−4	6	Transfer to Europa League	0–2	2–1	—	1–2
4	(Russia) Lokomotiv Moscow	6	1	0	5	4	11	−7	3		1–2	0–2	0–2	—

Source: UEFA
Rules for classification: Group stage tiebreakers

18 September 2019 1	Atlético Madrid (Spain)	2–2	(Italy) Juventus	Madrid, Spain
21:00 CEST (UTC+2)	Savić 70'; Costa (yellow card) 83'; Herrera 90'	Report	Matuidi (yellow card) 15', (goal) 65'; Cuadrado 48', (yellow card) 71'	Stadium: Wanda Metropolitano; Attendance: 66,283; Referee: Danny Makkelie (Netherlands)

1 October 2019 2	Lokomotiv Moscow (Russia)	0–2	(Spain) Atlético Madrid	Moscow, Russia
21:00 CEST (UTC+2)	Ignatyev (yellow card) 62'; João Mário (yellow card) 85'	Report	Partey (yellow card) 30', (goal) 58'; Félix 48'; Felipe (yellow card) 82'	Stadium: RZD Arena; Attendance: 27,051; Referee: Orel Grinfeld (Israel)

22 October 2019 3	Atlético Madrid (Spain)	1–0	(Germany) Bayer Leverkusen	Madrid, Spain
18:55 CEST (UTC+2)	Koke (yellow card) 54'; Morata 78'	Report	Bellarabi (yellow card) 38'	Stadium: Wanda Metropolitano; Attendance: 56,776; Referee: Artur Soares Dias (Portugal)

6 November 2019 4	Bayer Leverkusen (Germany)	2–1	(Spain) Atlético Madrid	Leverkusen, Germany
21:00 CET (UTC+1)	Partey 41' (o.g.); Weiser (yellow card) 50'; Volland 55'; Bellarabi (yellow card) 79'; Tah (yellow card) 79'; Amiri (red card) 84'	Report	Oblak (yellow card) 79'; Morata (yellow card) 79', (goal) 90+4'	Stadium: BayArena; Attendance: 28,160; Referee: Damir Skomina (Slovenia)

26 November 2019 5	Juventus (Italy)	1–0	(Spain) Atlético Madrid	Turin, Italy
21:00 CET (UTC+1)	Bentancur (yellow card) 35'; Dybala 45+2'	Report	Hermoso (yellow card) 32'; Lodi (yellow card) 40'; Saúl (yellow card) 52'; Herrera (yellow card) 58'	Stadium: Juventus Stadium; Attendance: 40,486; Referee: Anthony Taylor (England)

11 December 2019 6	Atlético Madrid (Spain)	2–0	(Russia) Lokomotiv Moscow	Madrid, Spain
21:00 CET (UTC+1)	Félix 17' (pen.); Felipe 54'; Correa (yellow card) 67'	Report	Murilo (yellow card) 40'; Krychowiak (yellow card) 42'	Stadium: Wanda Metropolitano; Attendance: 58,426; Referee: Viktor Kassai (Hungary)

==== Knockout phase ====
===== Round of 16 =====
18 February 2020 First leg	Atlético Madrid (Spain)	1–0	(England) Liverpool	Madrid, Spain
21:00 CET (UTC+1)	Saúl 4'; Correa (yellow card) 45'	Report	Mané (yellow card) 40'; Gomez (yellow card) 59'	Stadium: Wanda Metropolitano; Attendance: 67,443; Referee: Szymon Marciniak (Poland)

11 March 2020 Second leg	Liverpool (England)	2–3 (a.e.t.) (2–4 agg.)	(Spain) Atlético Madrid	Liverpool, England
21:00 CET (UTC+1)	Wijnaldum 43'; Firmino 94'; Alexander-Arnold (yellow card) 119'	Report	Llorente 97', 105+1'; Morata (yellow card) 119', (goal) 120+1'; Saúl (yellow card) 120'	Stadium: Anfield; Attendance: 52,267; Referee: Danny Makkelie (Netherlands)

===== Quarter-finals =====
13 August 2020 Quarter-finals	RB Leipzig (Germany)	2–1	(Spain) Atlético Madrid	Lisbon, Portugal
21:00 CEST (UTC+2)	Olmo 51'; Klostermann (yellow card) 70'; Kampl (yellow card) 82'; Haidara (yellow card) 87'; Adams 88'	Report	Lodi (yellow card) 62'; Félix 71' (pen.); Giménez (yellow card) 90+6'	Stadium: Estádio José Alvalade; Attendance: 0 Referee: Szymon Marciniak (Poland)

== Statistics ==
=== Squad statistics ===
As of match played 13 August 2020

No.	Pos.	Nat.	Player	Total						La Liga						Copa del Rey						Supercopa						Champions League					
No.	Pos.	Nat.	Player					Yellow card	Red card					Yellow card	Red card					Yellow card	Red card					Yellow card	Red card					Yellow card	Red card
1	GK	(Spain)	Adán	1	1	0	0	0	0	0	1	0	0	0	0	1	0	0	0	0	0	0	0	0	0	0	0	0	0	0	0	0	0
2	DF	(Uruguay)	Giménez	24	3	0	1	4	0	19	2	0	0	2	0	0	0	0	0	0	0	1	0	0	0	1	0	4	1	0	1	1	0
4	DF	(Colombia)	Arias	14	4	0	1	1	0	11	3	0	1	1	0	1	0	0	0	0	0	0	1	0	0	0	0	2	0	0	0	0	0
5	MF	(Ghana)	Partey	39	7	4	1	16	0	29	6	3	0	13	0	0	1	0	0	0	0	2	0	0	0	2	0	8	0	1	1	1	0
6	MF	(Spain)	Koke	39	3	5	6	6	0	30	2	4	5	5	0	0	0	0	0	0	0	0	1	1	0	0	0	9	0	0	1	1	0
7	FW	(Portugal)	Félix	28	8	9	3	6	0	21	6	6	1	6	0	1	0	0	1	0	0	2	0	0	0	0	0	4	2	3	1	0	0
8	MF	(Spain)	Saúl	46	0	7	0	14	0	34	0	6	0	11	0	1	0	0	0	1	0	2	0	0	0	0	0	9	0	1	0	2	0
9	FW	(Spain)	Morata	32	12	16	4	8	1	25	9	12	2	6	1	0	0	0	0	0	0	2	0	1	1	0	0	5	3	3	1	2	0
10	FW	(Argentina)	Correa	30	14	7	7	8	0	22	11	5	6	5	0	1	0	1	0	0	0	2	0	1	1	1	0	5	3	0	0	2	0
11	MF	(France)	Lemar	12	17	0	0	2	0	10	12	0	0	2	0	0	0	0	0	0	0	0	0	0	0	0	0	2	5	0	0	0	0
12	DF	(Brazil)	Lodi	39	4	1	3	8	1	28	4	1	2	6	1	0	0	0	0	0	0	2	0	0	0	0	0	9	0	0	1	2	0
13	GK	(Slovenia)	Oblak	49	0	0	0	1	0	38	0	0	0	0	0	0	0	0	0	0	0	2	0	0	0	0	0	9	0	0	0	1	0
14	MF	(Spain)	Llorente	18	18	5	4	6	0	16	13	3	3	4	0	1	0	0	0	1	0	0	2	0	0	1	0	1	3	2	1	0	0
15	DF	(Montenegro)	Savić	27	1	1	0	8	0	22	0	0	0	6	0	0	0	0	0	0	0	1	1	0	0	2	0	4	0	1	0	0	0
16	MF	(Mexico)	Herrera	18	12	1	2	2	0	12	9	0	2	1	0	1	0	0	0	0	0	2	0	0	0	0	0	3	3	1	0	1	0
17	FW	(Serbia)	Šaponjić	0	3	0	0	0	0	0	2	0	0	0	0	0	1	0	0	0	0	0	0	0	0	0	0	0	0	0	0	0	0
18	DF	(Brazil)	Felipe	33	3	2	0	10	0	23	2	1	0	7	0	1	0	0	0	0	0	2	0	0	0	2	0	7	1	1	0	1	0
19	FW	(Spain)	Costa	20	10	5	5	5	0	14	9	5	4	4	0	0	0	0	0	0	0	0	0	0	0	0	0	6	1	0	1	1	0
20	MF	(Spain)	Vitolo	13	22	3	2	3	0	11	17	3	2	3	0	1	0	0	0	0	0	0	2	0	0	0	0	1	3	0	0	0	0
21	MF	(Belgium)	Carrasco	7	9	1	2	2	0	6	9	1	2	2	0	0	0	0	0	0	0	0	0	0	0	0	0	1	0	0	0	0	0
22	DF	(Spain)	Hermoso	19	4	0	0	4	1	15	2	0	0	3	1	1	0	0	0	0	0	0	0	0	0	0	0	3	2	0	0	1	0
23	DF	(England)	Trippier	31	2	0	5	2	0	23	2	0	4	2	0	0	0	0	0	0	0	2	0	0	0	0	0	6	0	0	1	0	0
24	DF	(Croatia)	Vrsaljko	5	2	0	1	3	0	4	1	0	1	3	0	0	0	0	0	0	0	0	0	0	0	0	0	1	1	0	0	0	0
32	MF	(Spain)	Riquelme^{1}	0	2	0	0	0	0	0	1	0	0	0	0	0	1	0	0	0	0	0	0	0	0	0	0	0	0	0	0	0	0
34	FW	(Spain)	Camello^{1}	0	3	0	0	0	0	0	2	0	0	0	0	0	1	0	0	0	0	0	0	0	0	0	0	0	0	0	0	0	0
35	MF	(Spain)	Sánchez^{1}	5	1	0	0	1	0	4	1	0	0	1	0	1	0	0	0	0	0	0	0	0	0	0	0	0	0	0	0	0	0
38	MF	(Spain)	Moya^{1}	0	1	0	0	0	0	0	1	0	0	0	0	0	0	0	0	0	0	0	0	0	0	0	0	0	0	0	0	0	0
39	MF	(Spain)	Óscar^{1}	0	1	0	0	0	0	0	1	0	0	0	0	0	0	0	0	0	0	0	0	0	0	0	0	0	0	0	0	0	0
40	FW	(Spain)	Poveda^{1}	0	1	0	0	0	0	0	1	0	0	0	0	0	0	0	0	0	0	0	0	0	0	0	0	0	0	0	0	0	0
48	FW	(Spain)	Germán^{1}	0	1	0	0	0	0	0	1	0	0	0	0	0	0	0	0	0	0	0	0	0	0	0	0	0	0	0	0	0	0
Own goals				–	–	1	–	–	–	–	–	1	–	–	–	–	–	0	–	–	–	–	–	0	–	–	–	–	–	0	–	–	–
Total				–	–	68	47	120	3	–	–	51	35	93	3	–	–	1	1	2	0	–	–	3	2	9	0	–	–	13	9	16	0

^{1}Players from reserve team - Atlético Madrid B.

=== Goalscorers ===
As of match played 13 August 2020

Rank	No.	Pos.	Player	La Liga	Copa del Rey	Supercopa	Champions League	Total
1	9	FW	(Spain) Álvaro Morata	12	0	1	3	16
2	7	FW	(Portugal) João Félix	6	0	0	3	9
3	8	MF	(Spain) Saúl	6	0	0	1	7
3	10	FW	(Argentina) Ángel Correa	5	1	1	0	7
5	6	MF	(Spain) Koke	4	0	1	0	5
5	14	MF	(Spain) Marcos Llorente	3	0	0	2	5
5	19	FW	(Spain) Diego Costa	5	0	0	0	5
8	5	MF	(Ghana) Thomas Partey	3	0	0	1	4
9	20	MF	(Spain) Vitolo	3	0	0	0	3
10	18	DF	(Brazil) Felipe	1	0	0	1	2
11	12	DF	(Brazil) Renan Lodi	1	0	0	0	1
11	15	DF	(Montenegro) Stefan Savić	0	0	0	1	1
11	16	MF	(Mexico) Héctor Herrera	0	0	0	1	1
Own goals				1	0	0	0	1
TOTAL				51	1	3	13	68

^{1}Player from reserve team - Atlético Madrid B.

=== Clean sheets ===
As of match played 13 August 2020

Rank	No.	Pos.	Player	Matches played	Clean sheet %	La Liga (%)	Cup (%)	Supercopa (%)	Champions League (%)	Total
1	13	GK	(Slovenia) Jan Oblak	49	45%	17 (45%)	0 (0%)	1 (50%)	4 (44%)	22
2	1	GK	(Spain) Antonio Adán	2	0%	0 (0%)	0 (0%)	0 (0%)	0 (0%)	0
TOTALS				50	44%	17 (45%)	0 (0%)	1 (50%)	4 (44%)	22

=== Attendances ===
As of match played 19 July 2020

	Matches	Attendances	Average	High	Low
La Liga	19	802,458	42,234	68,032	0
Copa del Rey	0	0	0	0	0
Champions League	3	181,485	60,495	66,283	56,776
Total	22	983,943	51,364	68,032	0
