= 2019–20 Real Madrid CF season =

116th season in existence of Real Madrid CF

Real Madrid
2019–20 season
- President: Florentino Pérez
- Head coach: Zinedine Zidane
- Stadium: Santiago Bernabéu (until March); Alfredo Di Stéfano (from 14 June)
- La Liga: 1st
- Copa del Rey: Quarter-finals
- Supercopa de España: Winners
- UEFA Champions League: Round of 16
- Top goalscorer: League: Karim Benzema (21); All: Karim Benzema (27)
- Highest home attendance: 78,237 vs Barcelona (1 March 2020)
- Lowest home attendance: 53,870 vs Leganés (30 October 2019)
- Average home league attendance: 66,736
- Biggest win: Real Madrid 6–0 Galatasaray
- Biggest defeat: Paris Saint-Germain 3–0 Real Madrid
Home colours	Away colours	Third colours

The 2019–20 Real Madrid Club de Fútbol season was the club's 116th season in existence and its 89th consecutive season in the top flight of Spanish football. It covered a period from 1 July 2019 to 7 August 2020.

This season was the first since 2013–14 without goalkeeper Keylor Navas, who departed for Paris Saint-Germain.

== Kits ==
Supplier: Adidas / Sponsor: Emirates

== Summary ==
=== Pre-season ===
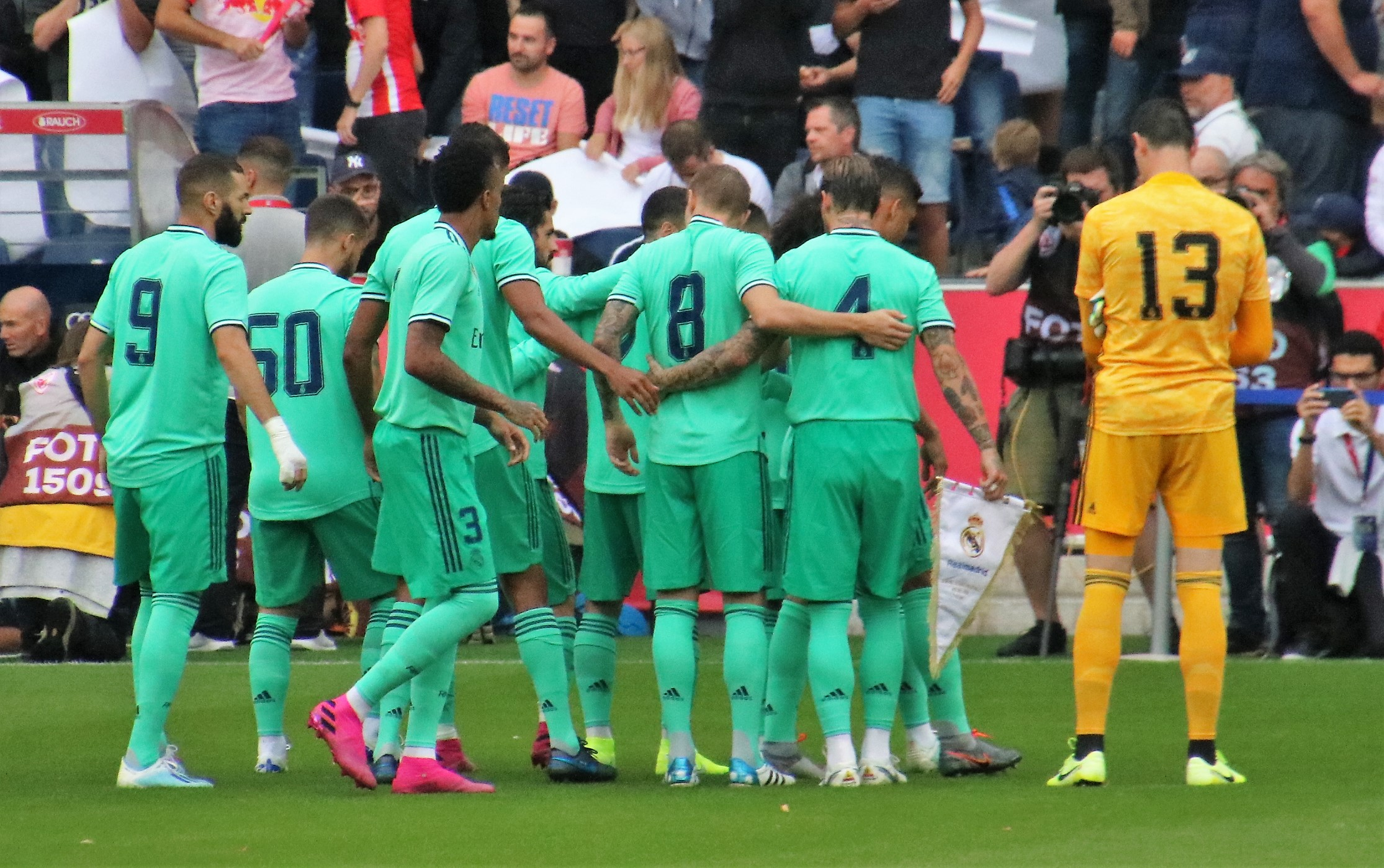
Madrid players in a pre-season friendly against Red Bull Salzburg

On 4 June, Luka Jović signed from Eintracht Frankfurt on a contract until 2025. Three days later Eden Hazard was acquired from Chelsea, while Ferland Mendy was bought from Lyon on a six-year contract on 12 June. On 20 June, Marcos Llorente was sold to Atlético Madrid, and Mateo Kovačić joined Chelsea on 1 July, having spent the previous season there on loan.

=== August ===
The first match of the season, on 17 August 2019, saw a 3–1 victory for Madrid at Celta Vigo. The goals came from Karim Benzema, Toni Kroos and Lucas Vázquez. A week later, the game against Valladolid ended in a 1–1 draw after Benzema initially gave Real the lead.

=== September ===
On the first day of the month, Gareth Bale secured one point for Real in a 2–2 draw, after he equalized the game twice at Villarreal. A day later, Keylor Navas left Madrid to join Paris Saint-Germain, with Alphonse Areola replacing him on a one-year loan deal from the Parisians. On 14 September, a brace from Benzema and a goal from Casemiro gave Madrid a 3–0 lead, before Levante was able to cut it to 3–2, which was the final result. In the new Champions League season, Madrid started with a 0–3 loss at Paris on 18 September. Another goal from Benzema lifted Madrid to a 1–0 win at Sevilla on 22 September. Three days later, goals from Vinícius Júnior and Rodrygo secured a 2–0 home win over Osasuna, putting Madrid at the top of the table. The Madrid derby on 28 September ended in a goalless draw.

=== October ===
On the first day of the month, Madrid took on Club Brugge in the Champions League. The game ended in a 2–2 draw, after Sergio Ramos and Casemiro brought Madrid back from a 0–2 deficit. Four days later, Real defeated Granada 4–2 with goals from Benzema, Hazard, Luka Modrić and James Rodríguez. On 19 October, the away game at Mallorca was lost 0–1. The Champions League match at Galatasaray was won 1–0 after a goal from Kroos. On 30 October, the match against CD Leganés was won 5–0 with goals from Rodrygo, Kroos, Sergio Ramos, Benzema and Jović.

=== November ===
On 2 November, the game against Real Betis ended in a 0–0 draw. The game against Galatasaray in the Champions League was won 6–0 after a hat-trick from Rodrygo, a brace from Benzema and a goal from Ramos. Three days later, the away game at SD Eibar was won 4–0 with a brace from Benzema and goals from Ramos and Valverde. After the international break, Madrid recorded a 3–1 victory over Real Sociedad on 23 November. After falling behind early, goals from Benzema, Valverde and Modrić secured the three points. Three days later, the Champions league match against Paris ended in a 2–2 draw, with a brace from Benzema initially putting Real up 2–0 only for Paris to score two successive goals late in the game. With that draw, Madrid advanced to the knockout stage of the tournament for the 23rd time in a row. On the last day of the month, goals from Ramos and Dani Carvajal got Madrid a 2–1 win at Alavés.

=== December ===
The game against Espanyol on 7 December ended in a 2–0 win after Raphaël Varane and Benzema scored. Four days later, the last Champions League group stage game at Brugge was won 3–1, with Rodrygo, Vinícius and Modrić scoring the goals. A late goal from Benzema saved Madrid one point in a 1–1 draw at Valencia on 15 December. The season's first Clásico against Barcelona on 18 December resulted in a 0–0 stalemate, with Madrid thoroughly outplaying Barça away from home but failing to convert. Four days later, the last game of the year against Athletic Bilbao also ended 0–0.

=== January ===
The new year started with a 3–0 victory against Getafe on 4 January. The goals were scored by Varane and Modrić plus an own goal. Four days later, Valencia was defeated 3–1 in the semi-final of the 2019–20 Supercopa de España after goals from Kroos, Isco and Modrić. On 12 January, the Supercopa was won 4–1 in a penalty shootout against Atlético Madrid, with the match itself having ended in a 0–0 draw. This marked the eleventh time that Madrid won the trophy. Next, a brace from Casemiro secured three points for Real in a 2–1 victory over Sevilla. Reinier Jesus Carvalho joined Madrid on 20 January 2020. Two days later, in the round of 32 of the 2019–20 Copa del Rey, Madrid defeated Unionistas de Salamanca CF 3–1 with goals from Bale, Brahim Díaz and an own goal to advance to the next round. In the last league game for this month, Madrid beat Valladolid 1–0 at the José Zorrilla Stadium to move to the top of the table and establish a three-point lead over Barcelona. The only goal was scored by Nacho. On 29 January, Real defeated Zaragoza 4–0 to proceed to the quarter-finals of the Copa del Rey. The goals were scored by Varane, Vázquez, Vinícius and Benzema.

=== February ===
The first day of the new month brought another Madrid derby against Atlético. Benzema scored the lone goal of the game to give Real a 1–0 win. Five days later, Madrid lost the Copa del Rey quarter-final match to Sociedad 3–4, with Marcelo, Rodrygo and Nacho scoring the goals in an attempted late comeback. With that result, Madrid's drought in the competition extended to six years. The game against Osasuna on 9 February was won 4–1. Isco, Ramos, Vázquez and Jović scored the goals after Madrid fell behind early. A week later, the game against Celta Vigo ended in a 2–2 draw with a late equalizer, despite Kroos and Ramos giving Real a 2–1 lead. On 22 February, the match against Levante was lost 0–1 due to a late goal. The first leg of the Champions League round of 16 against Manchester City was lost 1–2. Isco scored the lone goal for Madrid.

=== March ===
On the first day of the month, Real defeated Barcelona 2–0 in the season's second Clásico. Vinícius and Mariano scored the goals, with Madrid regaining the lead position in the standings. A week later, the away game at Betis was lost 1–2, meaning Madrid again slipped to second. Benzema scored the penalty for Real. On 12 March, after a player from Real Madrid's basketball team tested positive for SARS-CoV-2, all players of basketball and football teams alike were forced into quarantine. This superseded the postponements of several matches. On 23 March, following the outbreak of the COVID-19 pandemic in Europe, the league was suspended indefinitely.

=== May ===
After a two and a half-month hiatus, it was announced on 31 May that the league would be resumed on 11 June, with all games being played behind closed doors.

=== June ===
In Madrid's first game back after the break on 14 June, Eibar was defeated 3–1 with goals from Kroos, Ramos and Marcelo. Four days later, the game against Valencia ended in a 3–0 victory, with a brace from Benzema and a goal from Asensio. On 21 June, Madrid was able to defeat Real Sociedad by a 2–1 margin, getting back to the top of the table. The goals were scored by Ramos and Benzema. Another three days later, Mallorca was defeated 2–0 with goals from Vinícius and Ramos. A goal from Casemiro secured another three points for Real, as they defeated Espanyol 1–0 on 28 June.

=== July ===
On 2 July, Getafe was defeated 1–0 per a Ramos penalty, which gave Madrid a four-point cushion at the top of the table. The exact same scenario secured Real another victory three days later, against Athletic Bilbao. On 10 July, Alavés was defeated 2–0, after Benzema and Asensio scored. Two early goals from Mendy and Benzema secured Madrid their ninth win in a row with a 2–1 victory at Granada. After that game, Real had a four-point lead in the standings with two matches to go. After a narrow 2–1 home victory over Villarreal on 16 July, thanks to a brace from Benzema, Madrid mathematically clinched a record-extending 34th league title. Conversely, this was only their third title since the start of Barcelona's dominance in the 2008–09 season. Three days later, the last league game of the season at Leganés was drawn 2–2 with goals from Ramos and Asensio.

=== August ===
After the league was finished, Madrid went on to play the postponed second leg of the Champions League against Manchester City on 7 August. The match was a practical repeat of the first leg, with Madrid losing 1–2 and being eliminated 2–4 on aggregate. The lone goal came from Benzema who scored an equalizer in the first half. This result meant that Real had been knocked out in the round of 16 for the second season running.

== Players ==
N	Pos.	Nat.	Name	Age	EU	Since	App	Goals	Ends	Transfer fee	Notes
1	GK	(France)	Alphonse Areola	27	EU	2019	9	0	2020	Loan	
2	DF	(Spain)	Dani Carvajal	28	EU	2013	279	6	2022	€6.5M	Originally from youth system
3	DF	(Brazil)	Éder Militão	22	Non-EU	2019	20	0	2025	€50M	
4	DF	(Spain)	Sergio Ramos (captain)	34	EU	2005	650	97	2021	€28M	
5	DF	(France)	Raphaël Varane (3rd VC)	27	EU	2011	319	15	2022	€10M	
6	DF	(Spain)	Nacho	30	EU	2012	200	11	2022	Youth system	
7	FW	(Belgium)	Eden Hazard	29	EU	2019	22	1	2024	€115M	
8	MF	(Germany)	Toni Kroos	30	EU	2014	278	19	2023	€25M	
9	FW	(France)	Karim Benzema (2nd VC)	32	EU	2009	513	249	2021	€35M	
10	MF	(Croatia)	Luka Modrić	34	EU	2012	343	22	2021	€30M	
11	FW	(Wales)	Gareth Bale	31	EU	2013	251	105	2022	€100.8M	
12	DF	(Brazil)	Marcelo (VC)	32	EU	2007 (Winter)	509	38	2022	€6.5M	Second nationality: Spain
13	GK	(Belgium)	Thibaut Courtois	28	EU	2018	77	0	2025	€35M	
14	MF	(Brazil)	Casemiro	28	EU	2013	240	23	2021	€6M	Second nationality: Spain
15	MF	(Uruguay)	Federico Valverde	22	EU	2016	69	2	2021	€6M	Second nationality: Spain
16	MF	(Colombia)	James Rodríguez	29	EU	2014	125	37	2021	€80M	Second nationality: Spain
17	FW	(Spain)	Lucas Vázquez	29	EU	2015	206	23	2021	€1M	Originally from youth system
18	FW	(Serbia)	Luka Jović	22	Non-EU	2019	27	2	2025	€60M	
20	FW	(Spain)	Marco Asensio	24	EU	2014	146	30	2023	€3.9M	
21	FW	(Morocco)	Brahim Díaz	21	EU	2019 (Winter)	21	2	2025	€17M	
22	MF	(Spain)	Isco	28	EU	2013	307	51	2022	€27M	
23	DF	(France)	Ferland Mendy	25	EU	2019	31	1	2025	€48M	
24	FW	(Dominican Republic)	Mariano	27	EU	2018	40	10	2023	€23M	Originally from youth system
25	FW	(Brazil)	Vinícius Júnior	20	Non-EU	2018	69	9	2025	€45M	
27	FW	(Brazil)	Rodrygo	19	Non-EU	2019	26	7	2025	€45M	

- Last updated: 7 August 2020
- Source: realmadrid.com
- Ordered by squad number.

== Transfers ==
=== In ===
No.	Pos.	Nat.	Name	Age	EU	Moving from	Type	Transfer window	Ends	Transfer fee	Source
1	GK	(France)	Alphonse Areola	26	EU	(France) Paris Saint-Germain	Loan	Summer	2020	€2M	Real Madrid
3	DF	(Brazil)	Éder Militão	20	Non-EU	(Portugal) Porto	Transfer	Summer	2025	€50M	Real Madrid
7	MF	(Belgium)	Eden Hazard	28	EU	(England) Chelsea	Transfer	Summer	2024	€115M	Real Madrid
16	MF	(Colombia)	James Rodríguez	27	Non-EU	(Germany) Bayern Munich	End of loan	Summer	2020	Free	Bayern Munich
18	FW	(Serbia)	Luka Jović	21	Non-EU	(Germany) Eintracht Frankfurt	Transfer	Summer	2025	€60M	Real Madrid
23	DF	(France)	Ferland Mendy	24	EU	(France) Lyon	Transfer	Summer	2025	€48M	Real Madrid
25	GK	(Ukraine)	Andriy Lunin	20	Non-EU	Leganés	End of loan	Summer	2024	Free	
27	FW	(Brazil)	Rodrygo	18	Non-EU	(Brazil) Santos	Transfer	Summer	2025	€45M	Real Madrid
	DF	(France)	Théo Hernandez	21	EU	Real Sociedad	End of loan	Summer	2023	Free	
	DF	(Spain)	Álvaro Tejero	22	EU	Albacete	End of loan	Summer		Free	
	DF	(Spain)	Jesús Vallejo	22	EU	(England) Wolverhampton Wanderers	End of loan	Winter	2021	Free	Wolvesbite
	MF	(Spain)	Alberto Soro	20	EU	Real Zaragoza	Transfer	Summer	2024	€2.5M	Real Zaragoza
	MF	(Spain)	Aleix Febas	23	EU	Albacete	End of loan	Summer		Free	
	MF	(Croatia)	Mateo Kovačić	25	EU	(England) Chelsea	End of loan	Summer	2021	Free	
	MF	(Norway)	Martin Ødegaard	20	Non-EU	(Netherlands) Vitesse	End of loan	Summer		Free	
	MF	(Spain)	Óscar	21	EU	Leganés	End of loan	Summer		Free	
	FW	(Spain)	Borja Mayoral	22	EU	Levante	End of loan	Summer		Free	
	FW	(Spain)	Raúl de Tomás	24	EU	Rayo Vallecano	End of loan	Summer		Free	
	GK	(Ukraine)	Andriy Lunin	20	Non-EU	Valladolid	End of loan	Winter		Free	Real Madrid
	MF	(Brazil)	Reinier	17	Non-EU	(Brazil) Flamengo	Transfer	Winter	2026	€30M	Real Madrid
	FW	(Spain)	Hugo Vallejo	19	EU	Málaga	Transfer	Winter	2023		Málaga

Total spending: ▼€352.5M

=== Out ===
No.	Pos.	Nat.	Name	Age	EU	Moving to	Type	Transfer window	Transfer fee	Source
1	GK	(Costa Rica)	Keylor Navas	32	EU	(France) Paris Saint-Germain	Transfer	Summer	€15M	Paris Saint-Germain
3	DF	(Spain)	Jesús Vallejo	22	EU	(England) Wolverhampton Wanderers	Loan	Summer	Free	Wolverhampton Wanderers
18	MF	(Spain)	Marcos Llorente	24	EU	Atlético Madrid	Transfer	Summer	€30M	Atlético Madrid
23	DF	(Spain)	Sergio Reguilón	22	EU	Sevilla	Loan	Summer	Free	Sevilla
24	MF	(Spain)	Dani Ceballos	22	EU	(England) Arsenal	Loan	Summer	Free	Arsenal
25	GK	(Ukraine)	Andriy Lunin	20	Non-EU	Valladolid	Loan	Summer	Free	Valladolid
30	GK	(France)	Luca Zidane	21	EU	Racing Santander	Loan	Summer	Free	Racing Santander
	DF	(France)	Théo Hernandez	21	EU	(Italy) Milan	Transfer	Summer	€20M	Milan
	DF	(Spain)	Álvaro Tejero	22	EU	Eibar	Transfer	Summer	Free	Eibar
	MF	(Spain)	Alberto Soro	20	EU	Real Zaragoza	Loan	Summer	Free	Real Zaragoza
	MF	(Spain)	Aleix Febas	23	EU	RCD Mallorca	Transfer	Summer	Free	RCD Mallorca
	MF	(Croatia)	Mateo Kovačić	25	EU	(England) Chelsea	Transfer	Summer	€45M	Chelsea
	MF	(Japan)	Takefusa Kubo	18	Non-EU	Mallorca	Loan	Summer	Free	Mallorca
	MF	(Norway)	Martin Ødegaard	20	Non-EU	Real Sociedad	Loan	Summer	Free	Real Sociedad
	MF	(Spain)	Óscar	21	EU	Leganés	Loan	Summer	€0.6M	Leganés
	MF	(Brazil)	Lucas Silva	26	Non-EU		Contract terminated	Summer		Marca
	FW	(Spain)	Raúl de Tomás	24	EU	(Portugal) Benfica	Transfer	Summer	€20M	Benfica
	FW	(Spain)	Cristo González	21	EU	(Italy) Udinese	Transfer	Summer	€1.5M	Udinese Calcio
	FW	(Spain)	Borja Mayoral	22	EU	Levante	Loan	Summer	Free	Levante
	GK	(Ukraine)	Andriy Lunin	20	Non-EU	Oviedo	Loan	Winter	Free	Real Oviedo
	DF	(Spain)	Álvaro Odriozola	24	EU	(Germany) Bayern Munich	Loan	Winter	Free	Bayern Munich
	DF	(Spain)	Jesús Vallejo	22	EU	Granada	Loan	Winter	Free	Granada
	FW	(Spain)	Hugo Vallejo	19	EU	Deportivo La Coruña	Loan	Winter		Deportivo La Coruña

Total income: ▲€132.1M Net income: ▼€190.4M

== Pre-season and friendlies ==
Madrid competed at the 2019 International Champions Cup and the 2019 Audi Cup.

20 July 2019 1	Bayern Munich	3–1	Real Madrid	Houston, United States
20:01 EDT	Tolisso 15'; Kimmich (yellow card) 51'; Lewandowski 67'; Gnabry 69'; Ulreich (red card) 81'; Goretzka (yellow card) 90+2'	Report	Rodrygo 84'	Stadium: NRG Stadium; Attendance: 60,143; Referee: Ramy Touchan (United States)

23 July 2019 2	Real Madrid	2–2 (3–2 p)	Arsenal	Landover, United States
19:01 EDT	Nacho (yellow card) 5' (yellow-red card) 9'; Carvajal (yellow card) 26'; Bale 56'; Asensio 59'	Report	Lacazette 10' (pen.); Aubameyang 24'; Papastathopoulos (yellow card) 38' (yellow-red card) 40'	Stadium: FedExField; Attendance: 52,286; Referee: Timothy Ford (United States)
	Penalties
	Bale (penalty missed); Isco (penalty scored); Varane (penalty scored); Vinícius (penalty scored)		(penalty scored) Nelson; (penalty missed) Xhaka; (penalty scored) Saka; (penalty missed) Monreal; (penalty missed) Burton

26 July 2019 3	Real Madrid	3–7	Atlético Madrid	East Rutherford, United States
19:30 EDT	Isco (yellow card) 31'; Nacho 59', (yellow card) 88'; Carvajal (red card) 65'; Benzema 85' (pen.); Hernández 89'	Report	Costa 1', 28', 45' (pen.), 51', (red card) 65'; Félix 8'; Correa 19'; Saúl (yellow card) 65'; Vitolo 70'	Stadium: MetLife Stadium; Attendance: 57,714; Referee: Ted Unkel (United States)

30 July 2019 4	Real Madrid	0–1	Tottenham Hotspur	Munich, Germany
18:00 CEST (UTC+2)	Ramos (yellow card) 64'	Report	Kane 22'; Georgiou (yellow card) 54'	Stadium: Allianz Arena; Referee: Tobias Stieler (Germany)

31 July 2019 5	Real Madrid	5–3	Fenerbahçe	Munich, Germany
18:00 CEST (UTC+2)	Benzema 12', 27', 53'; Nacho 62'; De la Fuente (yellow card) 70'; Modrić (yellow card) 78'; Mariano 79'	Report	Rodrigues 6'; Dirar 35'; Tufan 59'; Sayyadmanesh (yellow card) 89'	Stadium: Allianz Arena; Referee: Benjamin Cortus (Germany)

7 August 2019 6	Red Bull Salzburg	0–1	Real Madrid	Salzburg, Austria
19:00 CEST (UTC+2)	Mwepu (yellow card) 63'; Farkas (yellow card) 72'	Report	Hazard 19'; Varane (yellow card) 54'; Carvajal (yellow card) 64'; Valverde (yellow card) 81'; Nacho (yellow card) 85'	Stadium: Stadion Wals-Siezenheim; Attendance: 30,188; Referee: Robert Schörgenhofer (Austria)

11 August 2019 7	Roma	2–2 (5–4 p)	Real Madrid	Rome, Italy
20:00 CEST (UTC+2)	Perotti 34'; Džeko 40'	Report	Marcelo 16'; Casemiro 39'; Militão (yellow card) 63'	Stadium: Stadio Olimpico; Referee: Michael Fabbri (Italy)
	Penalties
	Kolarov (penalty scored); Ünder (penalty scored); Antonucci (penalty scored); Cristante (penalty scored); Spinazzola (penalty scored)		(penalty scored) Kroos; (penalty scored) Isco; (penalty scored) Bale; (penalty scored) Modrić; (penalty missed) Marcelo

== Competitions ==
=== Overview ===
Competition	First match	Last match	Starting round	Final position	Record							
Competition	First match	Last match	Starting round	Final position	Pld	W	D	L	GF	GA	GD	Win %
La Liga	17 August 2019	19 July 2020	Matchday 1	Winners	38	26	9	3	70	25	+45	68.42
Copa del Rey	22 January 2020	6 February 2020	Round of 32	Quarter-finals	3	2	0	1	10	5	+5	66.67
Supercopa de España	8 January 2020	12 January 2020	Semi-finals	Winners	2	1	1	0	3	1	+2	50.00
Champions League	18 September 2019	7 August 2020	Group stage	Round of 16	8	3	2	3	16	12	+4	37.50
Total					51	32	12	7	99	43	+56	62.75

Source: Soccerway

=== La Liga ===
==== League table ====
Pos	Team	Pld	W	D	L	GF	GA	GD	Pts	Qualification or relegation
1	Real Madrid (C)	38	26	9	3	70	25	+45	87	Qualification for the Champions League group stage
2	Barcelona	38	25	7	6	86	38	+48	82	Qualification for the Champions League group stage
3	Atlético Madrid	38	18	16	4	51	27	+24	70	Qualification for the Champions League group stage
4	Sevilla	38	19	13	6	54	34	+20	70	Qualification for the Champions League group stage
5	Villarreal	38	18	6	14	63	49	+14	60	Qualification for the Europa League group stage

Source: La Liga, Soccerway
Rules for classification: 1) Points; 2) Head-to-head points; 3) Head-to-head goal difference; 4) Goal difference; 5) Goals scored; 6) Fair-play points (Note: Head-to-head record is used only after all the matches between the teams in question have been played)
(C) Champions

==== Results summary ====
Overall								Home						Away					
Pld	W	D	L	GF	GA	GD	Pts	W	D	L	GF	GA	GD	W	D	L	GF	GA	GD
38	26	9	3	70	25	+45	87	15	4	0	40	11	+29	11	5	3	30	14	+16

Source: La Liga

==== Result round by round ====
Round	1	2	3	4	5	6	7	8	9	10	11	12	13	14	15	16	17	18	19	20	21	22	23	24	25	26	27	28	29	30	31	32	33	34	35	36	37	38
Ground	A	H	A	H	A	H	A	H	A	H	H	A	H	A	H	A	A	H	A	H	A	H	A	H	A	H	A	H	H	A	H	A	H	A	H	A	H	A
Result	W	D	D	W	W	W	D	W	L	W	D	W	W	W	W	D	D	D	W	W	W	W	W	D	L	W	L	W	W	W	W	W	W	W	W	W	W	D
Position	1	3	5	3	2	1	1	1	2	2	2	2	2	2	2	2	2	2	2	2	1	1	1	1	2	1	2	2	2	1	1	1	1	1	1	1	1	1

Source: La Liga
A = Away; H = Home; W = Win; D = Draw; L = Loss

==== Matches ====
La Liga schedule was announced on 4 July 2019.

17 August 2019 1	Celta Vigo	1–3	Real Madrid	Vigo
17:00 CEST (UTC+2)	Kevin (yellow card) 7'; Blanco (yellow card) 12'; Suárez (yellow card) 12'; Aspas (yellow card) 15'; Fernández (yellow card) 49'; Costas (yellow card) 74'; Losada 90+1'	Report	Benzema 12'; Vinícius (yellow card) 36'; Modrić (red card) 56'; Kroos 61'; Odriozola (yellow card) 64'; Vázquez 80'	Stadium: Abanca-Balaídos; Attendance: 23,614; Referee: Xavier Estrada Fernández

24 August 2019 2	Real Madrid	1–1	Valladolid	Madrid
19:00 CEST (UTC+2)	Kroos (yellow card) 73'; Benzema 82'; Casemiro (yellow card) 90+2'	Report	Fede (yellow card) 33'; Guardiola 88'; Rubio (yellow card) 90+5'	Stadium: Santiago Bernabéu; Attendance: 62,444; Referee: Pablo González Fuertes

1 September 2019 3	Villarreal	2–2	Real Madrid	Villarreal
21:00 CEST (UTC+2)	Moreno 12'; Quintillà (yellow card) 52'; Gómez 74'	Report	Bale 45+1', 86', (yellow card) 90+2' (yellow-red card) 90+4'; Mendy (yellow card) 77'	Stadium: Estadio de la Cerámica; Attendance: 19,753; Referee: Jesús Gil Manzano

14 September 2019 4	Real Madrid	3–2	Levante	Madrid
13:00 CEST (UTC+2)	Benzema 25', 31'; Casemiro (yellow card) 28', (goal) 40'; Vázquez (yellow card) 40'	Report	Mayoral 49'; Melero 75'; Vezo (yellow card) 80'; Clerc (yellow card) 90'	Stadium: Santiago Bernabéu; Attendance: 60,726; Referee: Ricardo de Burgos Bengoetxea

22 September 2019 5	Sevilla	0–1	Real Madrid	Seville
21:00 CEST (UTC+2)	Banega (yellow card) 26'; Jordán (yellow card) 53'; De Jong (yellow card) 90+5'	Report	Carvajal (yellow card) 20'; Ramos (yellow card) 62'; Benzema 64'	Stadium: Ramón Sánchez Pizjuán; Attendance: 42,375; Referee: Juan Martínez Munuera

25 September 2019 6	Real Madrid	2–0	Osasuna	Madrid
21:00 CEST (UTC+2)	Militão (yellow card) 10'; Vinícius 37'; Nacho (yellow card) 57'; Rodrygo 72'	Report	Lillo (yellow card) 41'; Ávila (yellow card) 80'	Stadium: Santiago Bernabéu; Attendance: 57,589; Referee: Antonio Mateu Lahoz

28 September 2019 7	Atlético Madrid	0–0	Real Madrid	Madrid
21:00 CEST (UTC+2)	Partey (yellow card) 90+3'	Report	Nacho (yellow card) 22'; Varane (yellow card) 69'	Stadium: Wanda Metropolitano; Attendance: 67,942; Referee: José Luis González González

5 October 2019 8	Real Madrid	4–2	Granada	Madrid
16:00 CEST (UTC+2)	Benzema 2'; Casemiro (yellow card) 43'; Hazard 45+1'; Carvajal (yellow card) 54'; Modrić 61'; Areola (yellow card) 68'; Rodríguez 90+2', (yellow card) 90+3'	Report	Germán (yellow card) 54'; Soldado (yellow card) 56'; Machís 69' (pen.); Herrera (yellow card) 72'; Duarte (yellow card) 73', (goal) 78'; Puertas (yellow card) 81'	Stadium: Santiago Bernabéu; Attendance: 70,101; Referee: Santiago Jaime Latre

19 October 2019 9	Mallorca	1–0	Real Madrid	Palma
21:00 CEST (UTC+2)	Junior 7'; Sastre (yellow card) 30'; Baba (yellow card) 90+4'	Report	Odriozola (yellow card) 19' (yellow-red card) 74'	Stadium: Son Moix; Attendance: 19,503; Referee: Javier Alberola Rojas

30 October 2019 10	Real Madrid	5–0	Leganés	Madrid
21:15 CET (UTC+1)	Rodrygo 7'; Kroos 8'; Ramos 24' (pen.); Marcelo (yellow card) 63'; Benzema 69' (pen.); Jović 90+1'	Report	Soriano (yellow card) 24'; Bustinza (yellow card) 41'; Silva (yellow card) 52'; Rivera (yellow card) 62'; Ruibal (yellow card) 84'	Stadium: Santiago Bernabéu; Attendance: 53,870; Referee: César Soto Grado

2 November 2019 11	Real Madrid	0–0	Real Betis	Madrid
21:00 CET (UTC+1)	Casemiro (yellow card) 39'; Mendy (yellow card) 80'	Report	Bartra (yellow card) 11'; Robles (yellow card) 65'; Feddal (yellow card) 74'; Guardado (yellow card) 85'	Stadium: Santiago Bernabéu; Attendance: 70,209; Referee: José María Sánchez Martínez

9 November 2019 12	Eibar	0–4	Real Madrid	Eibar
18:30 CET (UTC+1)		Report	Benzema 17', 29' (pen.); Ramos 20' (pen.); Valverde 61'	Stadium: Ipurua; Attendance: 6,954; Referee: Adrián Cordero Vega

23 November 2019 13	Real Madrid	3–1	Real Sociedad	Madrid
21:00 CET (UTC+1)	Benzema 37'; Valverde 47'; Ramos (yellow card) 52'; Modrić 74'	Report	Willian José 2'; Zaldúa (yellow card) 84'	Stadium: Santiago Bernabéu; Attendance: 67,362; Referee: Jesús Gil Manzano

30 November 2019 14	Alavés	1–2	Real Madrid	Vitoria-Gasteiz
13:00 CET (UTC+1)	Vidal (yellow card) 7'; Pina (yellow card) 45+1'; Pérez 65' (pen.), (yellow card) 66'; Duarte (yellow card) 79'	Report	Modrić (yellow card) 32'; Ramos 52', (yellow card) 63'; Carvajal 69'; Militão (yellow card) 80'	Stadium: Mendizorrotza; Attendance: 16,299; Referee: Guillermo Cuadra Fernández

7 December 2019 15	Real Madrid	2–0	Espanyol	Madrid
13:00 CET (UTC+1)	Vinícius (yellow card) 17'; Varane 37'; Mendy (yellow card) 63' (yellow-red card) 83'; Valverde (yellow card) 74'; Benzema 79'	Report	Granero (yellow card) 15'; Calero (yellow card) 61'; Darder (yellow card) 90+1'	Stadium: Santiago Bernabéu; Attendance: 64,125; Referee: Santiago Jaime Latre

15 December 2019 16	Valencia	1–1	Real Madrid	Valencia
21:00 CET (UTC+1)	Soler (yellow card) 38', (goal) 78'	Report	Carvajal (yellow card) 77'; Jović (yellow card) 90'; Benzema 90+5'	Stadium: Mestalla; Attendance: 44,230; Referee: José María Sánchez Martínez

18 December 2019 17	Barcelona	0–0	Real Madrid	Barcelona
20:00 CET (UTC+1)	Rakitić (yellow card) 21'; Suárez (yellow card) 40'; Lenglet (yellow card) 45'	Report	Casemiro (yellow card) 66'; Bale (yellow card) 70'; Isco (yellow card) 76'; Ramos (yellow card) 78'; Carvajal (yellow card) 90+2'	Stadium: Camp Nou; Attendance: 93,426; Referee: Alejandro José Hernández Hernández
Note: The match was scheduled for 26 October 2019, but was postponed on 18 October due to the 2019 Catalan protests.

22 December 2019 18	Real Madrid	0–0	Athletic Bilbao	Madrid
21:00 CET (UTC+1)	Ramos (yellow card) 87'	Report		Stadium: Santiago Bernabéu; Attendance: 71,219; Referee: Adrián Cordero Vega

4 January 2020 19	Getafe	0–3	Real Madrid	Getafe
16:00 CET (UTC+1)	Nyom (yellow card) 34'; Suárez (yellow card) 39'; Portillo (yellow card) 90+5'	Report	Soria 34' (o.g.); Varane 53'; Jović (yellow card) 82'; Mendy (yellow card) 90+5'; Modrić 90+6'	Stadium: Coliseum Alfonso Pérez; Attendance: 15,426; Referee: José Luis Munuera Montero

18 January 2020 20	Real Madrid	2–1	Sevilla	Madrid
16:00 CET (UTC+1)	Modrić (yellow card) 37'; Casemiro 57', 69', (yellow card) 88'; Carvajal (yellow card) 87'	Report	Banega (yellow card) 54'; De Jong 64'	Stadium: Santiago Bernabéu; Attendance: 72,512; Referee: Juan Martínez Munuera

26 January 2020 21	Valladolid	0–1	Real Madrid	Valladolid
21:00 CET (UTC+1)	Joaquín (yellow card) 10'	Report	Varane (yellow card) 36'; Modrić (yellow card) 57'; Nacho (yellow card) 76', (goal) 78'	Stadium: José Zorrilla; Attendance: 23,404; Referee: Ricardo de Burgos Bengoetxea

1 February 2020 22	Real Madrid	1–0	Atlético Madrid	Madrid
16:00 CET (UTC+1)	Benzema 56'; Mendy (yellow card) 84'; Casemiro (yellow card) 88'	Report	Felipe (yellow card) 66'; Vrsaljko (yellow card) 80'	Stadium: Santiago Bernabéu; Attendance: 76,965; Referee: Xavier Estrada Fernández

9 February 2020 23	Osasuna	1–4	Real Madrid	Pamplona
16:00 CET (UTC+1)	U. García 14'; Vidal (yellow card) 57'; D. García (yellow card) 69'	Report	Isco 33'; Ramos 38', (yellow card) 79'; Carvajal (yellow card) 73'; Vázquez 84'; Jović 90+2'	Stadium: El Sadar; Attendance: 17,000; Referee: Jesús Gil Manzano

16 February 2020 24	Real Madrid	2–2	Celta Vigo	Madrid
21:00 CET (UTC+1)	Kroos 52'; Ramos 65' (pen.); Bale (yellow card) 72'; Carvajal (yellow card) 74'	Report	Smolov 7'; Olaza (yellow card) 57'; Yokuşlu (yellow card) 76'; Mina 86'	Stadium: Santiago Bernabéu; Attendance: 62,221; Referee: Javier Alberola Rojas

22 February 2020 25	Levante	1–0	Real Madrid	Valencia
21:00 CET (UTC+1)	Roger (yellow card) 35'; Morales 79'	Report	Ramos (yellow card) 10'; Casemiro (yellow card) 78'	Stadium: Ciutat de València; Attendance: 23,566; Referee: Alejandro José Hernández Hernández

1 March 2020 26	Real Madrid	2–0	Barcelona	Madrid
21:00 CET (UTC+1)	Vinícius (yellow card) 11', (goal) 71'; Carvajal (yellow card) 19'; Mariano 90+2'	Report	Alba (yellow card) 19'; Messi (yellow card) 85'	Stadium: Santiago Bernabéu; Attendance: 78,237; Referee: Antonio Mateu Lahoz

8 March 2020 27	Real Betis	2–1	Real Madrid	Seville
21:00 CET (UTC+1)	Sidnei 40'; Guardado (yellow card) 74'; Tello 82'	Report	Benzema 45+3' (pen.); Marcelo (yellow card) 55'	Stadium: Benito Villamarín; Attendance: 51,521; Referee: José Luis González González

14 June 2020 28	Real Madrid	3–1	Eibar	Madrid
19:30 CEST (UTC+2)	Kroos 4'; Ramos 30'; Marcelo 37'; Casemiro (yellow card) 47'	Report	Bigas 60'; Cristóforo (yellow card) 90+3'	Stadium: Alfredo Di Stéfano (Note: Due to the ongoing renovations of the Santiago Bernabéu, Real Madrid played their remaining home matches of the season at the Alfredo Di Stéfano.); Attendance: 0 Referee: Guillermo Cuadra Fernández
Note: The match was originally scheduled for 13 March 2020, but was postponed due to the COVID-19 pandemic. The match was played behind closed doors.

18 June 2020 29	Real Madrid	3–0	Valencia	Madrid
22:00 CEST (UTC+2)	Benzema 61', 86'; Asensio 74'	Report	Gayà (yellow card) 24'; Guillamón (yellow card) 84'; Lee (red card) 89'	Stadium: Alfredo Di Stéfano; Attendance: 0 Referee: José María Sánchez Martínez
Note: The match was originally scheduled for 21 March 2020, but was postponed due to the COVID-19 pandemic. The match was played behind closed doors.

21 June 2020 30	Real Sociedad	1–2	Real Madrid	San Sebastián
22:00 CEST (UTC+2)	Zubeldia (yellow card) 16'; Gorosabel (yellow card) 28'; Llorente (yellow card) 48'; Merino 83', (yellow card) 90+7'	Report	Casemiro (yellow card) 21'; Ramos 50' (pen.); Benzema 70'; Modrić (yellow card) 90+6'	Stadium: Reale Arena; Attendance: 0 Referee: Xavier Estrada Fernández
Note: The match was originally scheduled for 5 April 2020, but was postponed due to the COVID-19 pandemic. The match was played behind closed doors.

24 June 2020 31	Real Madrid	2–0	Mallorca	Madrid
22:00 CEST (UTC+2)	Vinícius 19'; Ramos (yellow card) 35', (goal) 56'; Modrić (yellow card) 46'; Mendy (yellow card) 80'; Kroos (yellow card) 87'	Report	Budimir (yellow card) 8'	Stadium: Alfredo Di Stéfano; Attendance: 0 Referee: Mario Melero López
Note: The match was originally scheduled for 12 April 2020, but was postponed due to the COVID-19 pandemic. The match was played behind closed doors.

28 June 2020 32	Espanyol	0–1	Real Madrid	Cornellà de Llobregat
22:00 CEST (UTC+2)	Pedrosa (yellow card) 68'	Report	Casemiro 45'; Vinícius (yellow card) 87'	Stadium: RCDE Stadium; Attendance: 0 Referee: Antonio Mateu Lahoz
Note: The match was originally scheduled for 22 April 2020, but was postponed due to the COVID-19 pandemic. The match was played behind closed doors.

2 July 2020 33	Real Madrid	1–0	Getafe	Madrid
22:00 CEST (UTC+2)	Carvajal (yellow card) 15'; Ramos (yellow card) 27'; Modrić (yellow card) 45+4'; Militão (yellow card) 47'; Ramos 79' (pen.); Mariano (yellow card) 90+4'	Report	Timor (yellow card) 1'; Nyom (yellow card) 47'; Suárez (yellow card) 52'; Mata (yellow card) 72'; Arambarri (yellow card) 83'	Stadium: Alfredo Di Stéfano; Attendance: 0 Referee: Juan Martínez Munuera
Note: The match was originally scheduled for 26 April 2020, but was postponed due to the COVID-19 pandemic. The match was played behind closed doors.

5 July 2020 34	Athletic Bilbao	0–1	Real Madrid	Bilbao
14:00 CEST (UTC+2)	R. García (yellow card) 39'; D. García (yellow card) 73'; Muniain (yellow card) 90+5'; Berchiche (yellow card) 90+6'	Report	Ramos 73' (pen.), (yellow card) 90+1'; Casemiro (yellow card) 90+3'; Carvajal (yellow card) 90+6'	Stadium: San Mamés; Attendance: 0 Referee: José Luis González González
Note: The match was originally scheduled for 3 May 2020, but was postponed due to the COVID-19 pandemic. The match was played behind closed doors.

10 July 2020 35	Real Madrid	2–0	Alavés	Madrid
22:00 CEST (UTC+2)	Benzema 11' (pen.); Asensio 50'	Report	Mahmoud (yellow card) 73'	Stadium: Alfredo Di Stéfano; Attendance: 0 Referee: Jesús Gil Manzano
Note: The match was originally scheduled for 10 May 2020, but was postponed due to the COVID-19 pandemic. The match was played behind closed doors.

13 July 2020 36	Granada	1–2	Real Madrid	Granada
22:00 CEST (UTC+2)	Duarte (yellow card) 46'; Machís 50'; Dias (yellow card) 58'	Report	Mendy 10', (yellow card) 17'; Benzema 16'; Courtois (yellow card) 90+3'	Stadium: Nuevo Los Cármenes; Attendance: 0 Referee: Santiago Jaime Latre
Note: The match was originally scheduled for 13 May 2020, but was postponed due to the COVID-19 pandemic. The match was played behind closed doors.

16 July 2020 37	Real Madrid	2–1	Villarreal	Madrid
21:00 CEST (UTC+2)	Benzema 29', 77' (pen.); Carvajal (yellow card) 54'; Modrić (yellow card) 61'; Isco (yellow card) 86'	Report	Chakla (yellow card) 18'; Quintillà (yellow card) 68'; Iborra 83'	Stadium: Alfredo Di Stéfano; Attendance: 0 Referee: Alejandro José Hernández Hernández
Note: The match was originally scheduled for 17 May 2020, but was postponed due to the COVID-19 pandemic. The match was played behind closed doors.

19 July 2020 38	Leganés	2–2	Real Madrid	Leganés
21:00 CEST (UTC+2)	Recio (yellow card) 39'; Ruibal (yellow card) 43'; Gil 45+1'; Bustinza (yellow card) 49'; Silva (yellow card) 56'; Assalé 78'	Report	Ramos 9'; Asensio 52'; Brahim (yellow card) 66'	Stadium: Butarque; Attendance: 0 Referee: Guillermo Cuadra Fernández
Note: The match was originally scheduled for 24 May 2020, but was postponed due to the COVID-19 pandemic. The match was played behind closed doors.

=== Copa del Rey ===
Madrid joined the tournament in the round of 32, as they had participated in the 2019–20 Supercopa de España.

22 January 2020 Round of 32	Unionistas	1–3	Real Madrid	Villares de la Reina
21:00 CET (UTC+1)	Romero 57', (yellow card) 68'	Report	Bale 18'; Góngora 62' (o.g.); Brahim 90+2'	Stadium: Pistas del Helmántico; Attendance: 4,000; Referee: Mario Melero López

29 January 2020 Round of 16	Zaragoza	0–4	Real Madrid	Zaragoza
21:00 CET (UTC+1)		Report	Varane 6'; Vázquez 32'; Vinícius 72'; Benzema 79'	Stadium: La Romareda; Attendance: 31,500; Referee: José Luis González González

6 February 2020 Quarter-finals	Real Madrid	3–4	Real Sociedad	Madrid
19:00 CET (UTC+1)	Marcelo 59'; Militão (yellow card) 77'; Rodrygo 81'; Nacho 90+3'; Vinícius (yellow card) 90+5'	Report	Ødegaard (yellow card) 11', (goal) 22'; Le Normand (yellow card) 19'; Isak 54', 56'; Zubeldia (yellow card) 66'; Merino 69'; Gorosabel (yellow card) 86' (yellow-red card) 90+5'	Stadium: Santiago Bernabéu; Attendance: 64,012; Referee: Antonio Mateu Lahoz

=== Supercopa de España ===
The draw was held on 11 November 2019.

8 January 2020 Semi-final	Valencia	1–3	Real Madrid	Jeddah, Saudi Arabia
20:00 CET (UTC+1)	Parejo 90+2' (pen.)	Report	Kroos 15'; Isco 39'; Modrić 65'; Casemiro (yellow card) 88'	Stadium: King Abdullah Sports City; Attendance: 40,877; Referee: Jesús Gil Manzano

12 January 2020 Final	Real Madrid	0–0 (a.e.t.) (4–1 p)	Atlético Madrid	Jeddah, Saudi Arabia
19:00 CET (UTC+1)	Mendy (yellow card) 90+2'; Modrić (yellow card) 90+3'; Valverde (yellow card) 111', (red card) 115'; Carvajal (yellow card) 115'	Report	Felipe (yellow card) 27'; Partey (yellow card) 74'; Correa (yellow card) 115'; Savić (yellow card) 115'	Stadium: King Abdullah Sports City; Attendance: 59,053; Referee: José María Sánchez Martínez
	Penalties
	Carvajal (penalty scored); Rodrygo (penalty scored); Modrić (penalty scored); Ramos (penalty scored)		(penalty missed) Saúl; (penalty missed) Partey; (penalty scored) Trippier

=== UEFA Champions League ===
==== Group stage ====
Pos	Team	Pld	W	D	L	GF	GA	GD	Pts	Qualification	PAR	RMA	BRU	GAL
1	(France) Paris Saint-Germain	6	5	1	0	17	2	+15	16	Advance to knockout phase	—	3–0	1–0	5–0
2	(Spain) Real Madrid	6	3	2	1	14	8	+6	11	Advance to knockout phase	2–2	—	2–2	6–0
3	(Belgium) Club Brugge	6	0	3	3	4	12	−8	3	Transfer to Europa League	0–5	1–3	—	0–0
4	(Turkey) Galatasaray	6	0	2	4	1	14	−13	2		0–1	0–1	1–1	—

Source: UEFA
Rules for classification: Group stage tiebreakers

18 September 2019 1	Paris Saint-Germain (France)	3–0	(Spain) Real Madrid	Paris, France
21:00 CEST (UTC+2)	Di María 14', 33', (yellow card) 82'; Meunier 90+1'; Bernat (yellow card) 90+3'	Report	Carvajal (yellow card) 32'; Vinícius (yellow card) 82'; Varane (yellow card) 89'	Stadium: Parc des Princes; Attendance: 46,361; Referee: Anthony Taylor (England)

1 October 2019 2	Real Madrid (Spain)	2–2	(Belgium) Club Brugge	Madrid, Spain
18:55 CEST (UTC+2)	Ramos 55'; Casemiro 85'; Hazard (yellow card) 90+2'	Report	Dennis 9', 39'; Mignolet (yellow card) 68'; Openda (yellow card) 77'; Vormer (yellow card) 78' (yellow-red card) 84'	Stadium: Santiago Bernabéu; Attendance: 65,112; Referee: Georgi Kabakov (Bulgaria)

22 October 2019 3	Galatasaray (Turkey)	0–1	(Spain) Real Madrid	Istanbul, Turkey
21:00 CEST (UTC+2)	Seri (yellow card) 46'; Nzonzi (yellow card) 69'; Marcão (yellow card) 90+3'; Mariano (yellow card) 90+4'	Report	Kroos 18', (yellow card) 90+1'; Courtois (yellow card) 90+2'	Stadium: Türk Telekom Stadium; Attendance: 48,886; Referee: Daniele Orsato (Italy)

6 November 2019 4	Real Madrid (Spain)	6–0	(Turkey) Galatasaray	Madrid, Spain
21:00 CET (UTC+1)	Rodrygo 4', 7', 90+3'; Ramos 13' (pen.); Valverde (yellow card) 42'; Benzema 45', 81'	Report	Nzonzi (yellow card) 13'; Babel (yellow card) 57'	Stadium: Santiago Bernabéu; Attendance: 65,492; Referee: Felix Zwayer (Germany)

26 November 2019 5	Real Madrid (Spain)	2–2	(France) Paris Saint-Germain	Madrid, Spain
21:00 CET (UTC+1)	Benzema 17', 79'; Marcelo (yellow card) 68'	Report	Mbappé 81'; Sarabia 83'; Meunier (yellow card) 89'	Stadium: Santiago Bernabéu; Attendance: 75,534; Referee: Artur Soares Dias (Portugal)

11 December 2019 6	Club Brugge (Belgium)	1–3	(Spain) Real Madrid	Bruges, Belgium
21:00 CET (UTC+1)	Balanta (yellow card) 15'; Kossounou (yellow card) 22'; Sobol (yellow card) 34'; Vanaken 55'	Report	Modrić (yellow card) 6'; Casemiro (yellow card) 37'; Rodrygo 53'; Vinícius 64'; Modrić 90+1'	Stadium: Jan Breydel Stadium; Attendance: 27,308; Referee: Tobias Stieler (Germany)

==== Knockout phase ====
===== Round of 16 =====
26 February 2020 First leg	Real Madrid (Spain)	1–2	(England) Manchester City	Madrid, Spain
21:00 CET (UTC+1)	Valverde (yellow card) 48'; Modrić (yellow card) 54'; Isco 60'; Ramos (red card) 86'	Report	Mendy (yellow card) 29'; Gabriel Jesus 78'; De Bruyne 83' (pen.)	Stadium: Santiago Bernabéu; Attendance: 75,615; Referee: Daniele Orsato (Italy)

7 August 2020 Second leg	Manchester City (England)	2–1 (4–2 agg.)	(Spain) Real Madrid	Manchester, England
21:00 CEST (UTC+2)	Sterling 9'; Gabriel Jesus 68'	Report	Benzema 28'; Modrić (yellow card) 80'	Stadium: City of Manchester Stadium; Attendance: 0 Referee: Felix Brych (Germany)
Note: The match was postponed due to the COVID-19 pandemic. The match was rescheduled on 17 June to 7 August and was played behind closed doors.

== Statistics ==
=== Squad statistics ===
No.	Pos	Nat	Player	Total		La Liga		Copa del Rey		Champions League		Supercopa de España	
No.	Pos	Nat	Player	Apps	Goals	Apps	Goals	Apps	Goals	Apps	Goals	Apps	Goals
1	GK	(France)	Alphonse Areola	9	0	4	0	3	0	2	0	0	0
2	DF	(Spain)	Dani Carvajal	42	1	31	1	2	0	7	0	2	0
3	DF	(Brazil)	Éder Militão	20	0	15	0	2	0	3	0	0	0
4	DF	(Spain)	Sergio Ramos	44	13	35	11	2	0	5	2	2	0
5	DF	(France)	Raphaël Varane	43	3	32	2	1	1	8	0	2	0
6	DF	(Spain)	Nacho	10	2	6	1	3	1	1	0	0	0
7	MF	(Belgium)	Eden Hazard	22	1	16	1	0	0	6	0	0	0
8	MF	(Germany)	Toni Kroos	45	6	35	4	2	0	6	1	2	1
9	FW	(France)	Karim Benzema	48	27	37	21	3	1	8	5	0	0
10	MF	(Croatia)	Luka Modrić	39	5	31	3	1	0	5	1	2	1
11	FW	(Wales)	Gareth Bale	20	3	16	2	1	1	3	0	0	0
12	DF	(Brazil)	Marcelo	22	2	14	1	3	1	4	0	1	0
13	GK	(Belgium)	Thibaut Courtois	43	0	34	0	0	0	7	0	2	0
14	MF	(Brazil)	Casemiro	46	5	35	4	1	0	8	1	2	0
15	MF	(Uruguay)	Federico Valverde	44	2	33	2	3	0	6	0	2	0
16	MF	(Colombia)	James Rodríguez	14	1	8	1	3	0	2	0	1	0
17	FW	(Spain)	Lucas Vázquez	23	3	18	2	1	1	4	0	0	0
18	FW	(Serbia)	Luka Jović	27	2	17	2	3	0	5	0	2	0
20	MF	(Spain)	Marco Asensio	10	3	9	3	0	0	1	0	0	0
21	MF	(Spain)	Brahim	10	1	6	0	3	1	1	0	0	0
22	MF	(Spain)	Isco	30	3	23	1	1	0	4	1	2	1
23	DF	(France)	Ferland Mendy	32	1	25	1	0	0	5	0	2	0
24	FW	(Dominican Republic)	Mariano	7	1	5	1	0	0	0	0	2	0
25	FW	(Brazil)	Vinícius Júnior	38	5	29	3	3	1	5	1	1	0
27	FW	(Brazil)	Rodrygo	26	7	19	2	1	1	5	4	1	0
	GK	(Costa Rica)	Keylor Navas‡	0	0	0	0	0	0	0	0	0	0
	DF	(Spain)	Álvaro Odriozola‡	5	0	4	0	0	0	1	0	0	0

Last updated: 7 August 2020
Source: Soccerway

- ^{‡} Player left the club mid-season

=== Goals ===
Rank	Player	Position	La Liga	Copa del Rey	Champions League	Supercopa	Total
1	(France) Karim Benzema	FW	21	1	5	0	27
2	(Spain) Sergio Ramos	DF	11	0	2	0	13
3	(Brazil) Rodrygo	FW	2	1	4	0	7
4	(Germany) Toni Kroos	MF	4	0	1	1	6
5	(Brazil) Casemiro	MF	4	0	1	0	5
5	(Croatia) Luka Modrić	MF	3	0	1	1	5
5	(Brazil) Vinícius Júnior	FW	3	1	1	0	5
8	(Spain) Marco Asensio	MF	3	0	0	0	3
8	(Wales) Gareth Bale	FW	2	1	0	0	3
8	(Spain) Isco	MF	1	0	1	1	3
8	(France) Raphaël Varane	DF	2	1	0	0	3
8	(Spain) Lucas Vázquez	FW	2	1	0	0	3
13	(Serbia) Luka Jović	FW	2	0	0	0	2
13	(Brazil) Marcelo	DF	1	1	0	0	2
13	(Spain) Nacho	DF	1	1	0	0	2
13	(Uruguay) Federico Valverde	MF	2	0	0	0	2
17	(Colombia) James Rodriguez	MF	1	0	0	0	1
17	(Spain) Brahim	FW	0	1	0	0	1
17	(Belgium) Eden Hazard	FW	1	0	0	0	1
17	(Dominican Republic) Mariano	FW	1	0	0	0	1
17	(France) Ferland Mendy	DF	1	0	0	0	1
17	(Spain) Dani Carvajal	DF	1	0	0	0	1
Own goals			1	1	0	0	2
Total			70	10	16	3	99

=== Clean sheets ===
Rank	Player	La Liga	Copa del Rey	Champions League	Supercopa	Total
1	(Belgium) Thibaut Courtois	18	0	2	1	21
2	(France) Alphonse Areola	1	1	1	0	3
Total		19	1	3	1	24

=== Disciplinary record ===
N	P	Nat.	Name	La Liga			Copa del Rey			Champions League			Supercopa			Total			Notes
N	P	Nat.	Name	Yellow card	Second yellow card	Red card	Yellow card	Second yellow card	Red card	Yellow card	Second yellow card	Red card	Yellow card	Second yellow card	Red card	Yellow card	Second yellow card	Red card	Notes
10	MF	(Croatia)	Luka Modrić	7		1				3			1			11		1	
4	DF	(Spain)	Sergio Ramos	10								1				10		1	
15	MF	(Uruguay)	Federico Valverde	1						2					1	3		1	
23	DF	(France)	Ferland Mendy	6	1								1			7	1		
11	FW	(Wales)	Gareth Bale	2	1											2	1		
19	DF	(Spain)	Álvaro Odriozola	1	1											1	1		
14	MF	(Brazil)	Casemiro	11						1			1			13			
2	DF	(Spain)	Dani Carvajal	10						1			1			12			
25	FW	(Brazil)	Vinícius Júnior	4			1			1						6			
3	DF	(Brazil)	Éder Militão	2			1									3			
5	DF	(France)	Raphaël Varane	2						1						3			
6	DF	(Spain)	Nacho	3												3			
8	MF	(Germany)	Toni Kroos	2						1						3			
12	DF	(Brazil)	Marcelo	2						1						3			
13	GK	(Belgium)	Thibaut Courtois	1						1						2			
18	FW	(Serbia)	Luka Jović	2												2			
22	MF	(Spain)	Isco	2												2			
1	GK	(France)	Alphonse Areola	1												1			
7	FW	(Belgium)	Eden Hazard							1						1			
16	MF	(Colombia)	James Rodríguez	1												1			
17	FW	(Spain)	Lucas Vázquez	1												1			
21	FW	(Spain)	Brahim	1												1			
24	FW	(Dominican Republic)	Mariano	1												1			

Last updated: 7 August 2020
Source: Soccerway
Ordered by (red card) , (second yellow card) and (yellow card)
(yellow card) = Number of bookings; (second yellow card) = Number of sending offs after a second yellow card; (red card) = Number of sending offs by a direct red card.
