= 2020 Supercopa de España final =

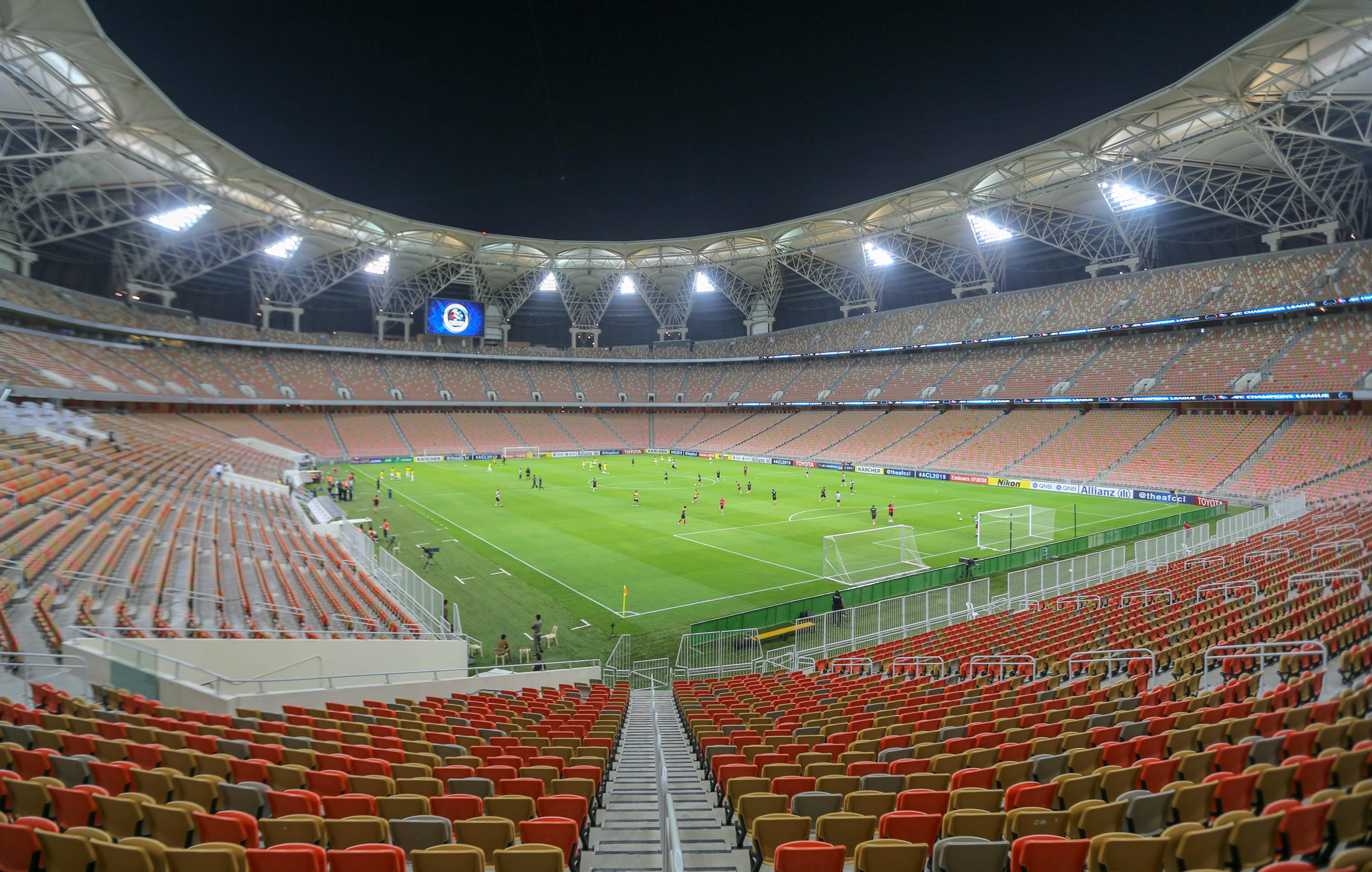
- The King Abdullah Sports City in Jeddah hosted the final.
- Event: 2020 Supercopa de España
Real Madrid	Atlético Madrid
0	0
- After extra time Real Madrid won 4–1 on penalties
- Date: 12 January 2020
- Venue: King Abdullah Sports City, Jeddah
- Man of the Match: Federico Valverde (Real Madrid)
- Referee: José María Sánchez Martínez (Region of Murcia)
- Attendance: 59,053
- Weather: Clear; 21 °C (70 °F); 35% humidity

The 2020 Supercopa de España final decided the winner of the 2020 Supercopa de España, the 36th edition of the annual Spanish football super cup competition. The match was played on 12 January 2020 at King Abdullah Sports City in Jeddah, Saudi Arabia. The final featured city rivals Real Madrid and Atlético Madrid.

Real Madrid won the match 4–1 on penalties, following a 0–0 draw after extra time, to win their 11th Supercopa title.

== Teams ==
Team	Qualification for tournament	Previous finals appearances (bold indicates winners)
Real Madrid	2018–19 La Liga third place	15 (1982, **1988**, **1989**, (Note: Real Madrid won the double in 1988–89, and thus were automatically awarded the Supercopa de España title for 1989.) **1990**, **1993**, 1995, **1997**, **2001**, **2003**, 2007, **2008**, 2011, **2012**, 2014, **2017**)
Atlético Madrid	2018–19 La Liga runners-up	6 (**1985**, 1991, 1992, 1996, 2013, **2014**)

== Route to the final ==
Real Madrid		Round	Atlético Madrid	
Opponent	Result	2019–20 Supercopa de España	Opponent	Result
Valencia	3–1	Semi-finals	Barcelona	3–2

== Match details ==
12 January 2020
21:00 AST

Real Madrid	0–0 (a.e.t.)	Atlético Madrid
	Report
Penalties
Carvajal (penalty scored); Rodrygo (penalty scored); Modrić (penalty scored); Ramos (penalty scored)	4–1	(penalty missed) Saúl; (penalty missed) Partey; (penalty scored) Trippier

King Abdullah Sports City, Jeddah
Attendance: 59,053
Referee: José María Sánchez Martínez (Murcia)

**Real Madrid**	**Atlético Madrid**

GK	13	(Belgium) Thibaut Courtois
RB	2	(Spain) Dani Carvajal	(yellow card) 115'
CB	5	(France) Raphaël Varane
CB	4	(Spain) Sergio Ramos (c)
LB	23	(France) Ferland Mendy	(yellow card) 90+2'
CM	14	(Brazil) Casemiro
CM	15	(Uruguay) Federico Valverde	(yellow card) 111' (red card) 115'
CM	8	(Germany) Toni Kroos		(substituted off) 103'
AM	10	(Croatia) Luka Modrić	(yellow card) 90+3'
AM	22	(Spain) Isco		(substituted off) 60'
CF	18	(Serbia) Luka Jović		(substituted off) 83'
Substitutes:
GK	1	(France) Alphonse Areola
DF	3	(Brazil) Éder Militão
DF	12	(Brazil) Marcelo
MF	16	(Colombia) James Rodríguez
FW	24	(Dominican Republic) Mariano		(substituted on) 83'
FW	25	(Brazil) Vinícius Júnior		(substituted on) 103'
FW	27	(Brazil) Rodrygo		(substituted on) 60'
Manager:
(France) Zinedine Zidane

GK	13	(Slovenia) Jan Oblak (c)
RB	23	(England) Kieran Trippier
CB	18	(Brazil) Felipe	(yellow card) 27'
CB	2	(Uruguay) José Giménez		(substituted off) 98'
LB	12	(Brazil) Renan Lodi		(substituted off) 89'
RM	10	(Argentina) Ángel Correa	(yellow card) 115'
CM	5	(Ghana) Thomas Partey	(yellow card) 74'
CM	16	(Mexico) Héctor Herrera		(substituted off) 56'
LM	8	(Spain) Saúl
CF	9	(Spain) Álvaro Morata
CF	7	(Portugal) João Félix		(substituted off) 101'
Substitutes:
GK	1	(Spain) Antonio Adán	(yellow card) 111'
DF	4	(Colombia) Santiago Arias		(substituted on) 101'
DF	15	(Montenegro) Stefan Savić	(yellow card) 115'	(substituted on) 98'
DF	22	(Spain) Mario Hermoso
MF	14	(Spain) Marcos Llorente		(substituted on) 89'
MF	20	(Spain) Vitolo		(substituted on) 56'
MF	32	(Spain) Rodrigo Riquelme
Manager:
(Argentina) Diego Simeone

Man of the Match:
Federico Valverde (Real Madrid)

Assistant referees:
Raúl Cabañero Martínez (Region of Murcia)
José Gallego García (Region of Murcia)
Fourth official:
Guillermo Cuadra Fernández (Balearic Islands)
Reserve assistant referee:
Diego Barbero Sevilla (Andalusia)
Video assistant referee:
Ignacio Iglesias Villanueva (Galicia)
Assistant video assistant referees:
Santiago Jaime Latre (Aragon)
Roberto Díaz Pérez del Palomar (Basque Country)

**Match rules**

- 90 minutes.
- 30 minutes of extra time if necessary.
- Penalty shoot-out if scores still level.
- Seven named substitutes.
- Maximum of three substitutions, with a fourth allowed in extra time.

== See also ==
- 2019–20 Atlético Madrid season
- 2019–20 Real Madrid CF season
