= 2020 Supercopa de España =

Spanish football competition played in Saudi Arabia

Tournament details
- Host country: Saudi Arabia
- Dates: 8–12 January 2020
- Teams: 4
- Venue: 1 (in 1 host city)

Final positions
- Champions: Real Madrid (11th title)
- Runners-up: Atlético Madrid

Tournament statistics
- Matches played: 3
- Goals scored: 9 (3 per match)
- Attendance: 158,340 (52,780 per match)
- Top scorer(s): Nine players (1 goal each)

The 2020 Supercopa de España was the 36th edition of the Supercopa de España, an annual football competition for clubs in the Spanish football league system that were successful in its major competitions in the preceding season.

In February 2019, it was announced that the competition would be changed from a two-team format to four teams, which would include a semi-final round. The semi-final round was played on 8 and 9 January 2020, and the final was held on 12 January; there was no third-place game.

The final was contested between Real Madrid and Atlético Madrid, and was won by Real Madrid 4–1 on penalties, following a 0–0 draw after extra time, to win their eleventh Supercopa title.

It was played in Saudi Arabia after the Saudi government offered to pay 40 million euros for each of the next three seasons.

== Qualification ==
The tournament was supposed to feature the winners and runners-up of the 2018–19 Copa del Rey and 2018–19 La Liga. However, as Barcelona were La Liga winners and Copa del Rey runners-up, the extra spot was awarded to La Liga third-placed Real Madrid.

=== Qualified teams ===
The following four teams qualified for the tournament.

Team	Method of qualification	Appearance	Last appearance as	Previous performance	
Team	Method of qualification	Appearance	Last appearance as	Winner(s)	Runners-up
Valencia	2018–19 Copa del Rey winners	5th	2008 runners-up	1	3
Barcelona	2018–19 La Liga winners and 2018–19 Copa del Rey runners-up	24th	2018 winners	13	10
Atlético Madrid	2018–19 La Liga runners-up	7th	2014 winners	2	4
Real Madrid	2018–19 La Liga third place	16th	2017 winners	10	5

== Venue ==
Location of the host city of the 2020 Supercopa de España.	City	Stadium
Location of the host city of the 2020 Supercopa de España.	Jeddah	King Abdullah Sports City
Location of the host city of the 2020 Supercopa de España.	Capacity: 62,345	

== Draw ==
The draw was held on 11 November at the Royal Spanish Football Federation headquarters, in La Ciudad del Fútbol. There was no restriction in it.

== Matches ==
- Times listed are SAST (UTC+3).

=== Bracket ===
Semi-finals
8 January 2020 – Jeddah
Valencia	1
Real Madrid	3
9 January 2020 – Jeddah
Barcelona	2
Atlético Madrid	3

Final
12 January 2020 – Jeddah
Real Madrid (p)	0 (4)
Atlético Madrid	0 (1)

=== Semi-finals ===
8 January 2020
22:00

Valencia	1–3	Real Madrid
Parejo 90+2' (pen.)	Report	Kroos 15'; Isco 39'; Modrić 65'

King Abdullah Sports City, Jeddah
Attendance: 40,877
Referee: Jesús Gil Manzano (Extremadura)

9 January 2020
22:00

Barcelona	2–3	Atlético Madrid
Messi 51'; Griezmann 62'	Report	Koke 46'; Morata 81' (pen.); Correa 86'

King Abdullah Sports City, Jeddah
Attendance: 58,410
Referee: José Luis González González (Castile and León)

=== Final ===
12 January 2020
21:00

Real Madrid	0–0 (a.e.t.)	Atlético Madrid
	Report
Penalties
Carvajal (penalty scored); Rodrygo (penalty scored); Modrić (penalty scored); Ramos (penalty scored)	4–1	(penalty missed) Saúl; (penalty missed) Partey; (penalty scored) Trippier

King Abdullah Sports City, Jeddah
Attendance: 59,053
Referee: José María Sánchez Martínez (Murcia)

== Criticism ==
The Spanish section of Amnesty International criticized the election of Saudi Arabia as the playground, citing the situation of human rights, specifically the death penalty, the Saudi intervention in Yemen, murder of Jamal Khashoggi, freedom of expression and the situation of women's rights. The Spanish government had also disapproved the possibility of playing in Saudi Arabia. The president of the RFEF, Luis Rubiales negotiated with Saudi authorities that, during the competition, female spectators could sit anywhere in the stadium, not being limited to a women-exclusive area. AI approved the achievement but contended that it is not enough.

Saudi authorities had already brought the 2018 and 2019 Supercoppa Italiana to the country.

== See also ==
- 2019–20 La Liga
- 2019–20 Copa del Rey
