= Rodrygo =

Brazilian footballer (born 2001)

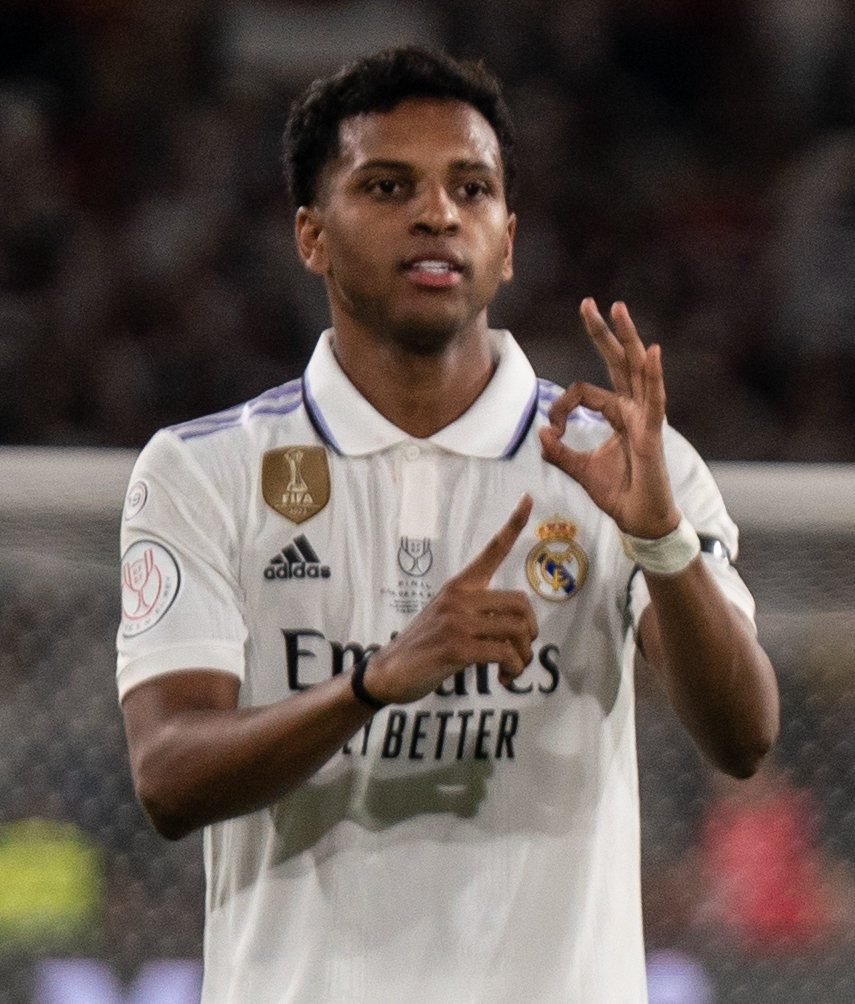
- Rodrygo with Real Madrid in 2023

Personal information
- Full name: Rodrygo Silva de Goes
- Date of birth: 9 January 2001 (age 25)
- Place of birth: Osasco, Brazil
- Height: 1.74 m (5 ft 9 in)
- Position: Winger

Team information
- Current team: Real Madrid
- Number: 11

Youth career
- 2011–2017: Santos

Senior career*
Years	Team	Apps	(Gls)
2017–2019	Santos	41	(9)
2019	Real Madrid Castilla	3	(2)
2019–	Real Madrid	191	(33)

International career^{‡}
2017–2018	Brazil U17	4	(3)
2018–2019	Brazil U20	10	(3)
2019–2021	Brazil U23	5	(1)
2019–	Brazil	37	(9)
- * Club domestic league appearances and goals as of 15:25, 3 March 2026 (UTC) ‡ National team caps and goals as of 23:12, 18 November 2025 (UTC)

Rodrygo Silva de Goes (Brazilian Portuguese: [ʁoˈdɾiɡu ˈsiwvɐ dʒi ˈɡɔjs]; born 9 January 2001), better known as Rodrygo, is a Brazilian professional footballer who plays primarily as a winger for La Liga club Real Madrid and the Brazil national team.

Rodrygo began his career with Santos, where he played 80 games and scored 17 goals before a €45 million transfer to Real Madrid in 2019. Over the following seasons, he established himself as a prominent member in Real Madrid's squad, helping the club win two La Liga–Champions League doubles in 2022 and 2024.

After representing Brazil at youth level, Rodrygo made his senior debut in 2019, aged only 18, representing Brazil at the 2022 FIFA World Cup in Qatar and the 2024 Copa América in the United States.

== Club career ==
=== Santos ===
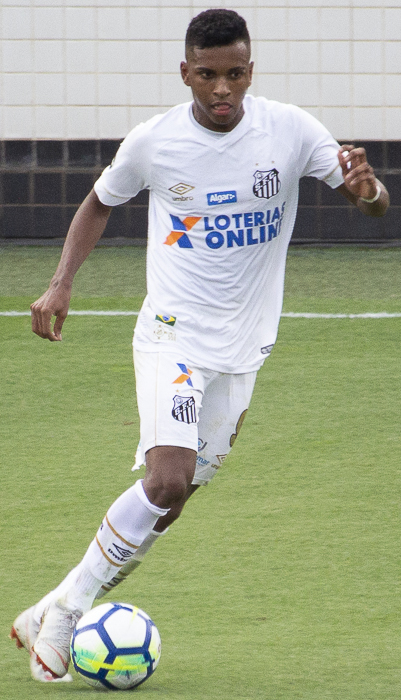
Rodrygo playing for Santos in 2018

Born in Osasco in São Paulo, Rodrygo joined Santos' youth setup in 2011 at the age of ten, initially assigned to the futsal team. Rodrygo travelled the world with Santos, spreading his beloved game of futsal under legendary futsal coach Barata who also trained Neymar, including a much heralded YouTube video with City Futsal in Dallas area in Texas, USA. In March 2017, with the first team regulars in Peru for a Copa Libertadores match against Sporting Cristal, he was called up to the first team by manager Dorival Júnior to complete training.

On 21 July 2017, Rodrygo signed his first professional contract, after agreeing to a five-year deal. On 1 November, he was promoted to the main squad by interim manager Elano.

Rodrygo made his first team – and Série A – debut on 4 November 2017, coming on as a late substitute for Bruno Henrique in a 3–1 home win against Atlético Mineiro. The following 25 January he scored his first senior goal, netting a last-minute winner in a 2–1 Campeonato Paulista away win against Ponte Preta.

Rodrygo made his Copa Libertadores debut on 1 March 2018, replacing Eduardo Sasha in a 2–0 away loss against Real Garcilaso; aged 17 years and 50 days, he became the youngest player of Santos to appear in the competition. Fifteen days later he scored his first goal in the tournament, netting his team's second through an individual effort in a 3–1 win against Nacional at the Pacaembu Stadium; at the age of 17 years, two months and six days, he became the youngest Brazilian to score in the competition before his record was broken by fellow Santos youth graduates Kaiky and Ângelo.

Rodrygo scored his first goal in the main category of Brazilian football on 14 April 2018, netting the last in a 2–0 home win against Ceará. On 3 June, he scored a hat-trick and also assisted Gabriel's last goal in a 5–2 home routing of Vitória.

On 26 July 2018, Rodrygo changed his jersey number from 43 to 9 (a number he already wore during the Libertadores). For the 2019 campaign, he again switched numbers, now to jersey 11, previously worn by fellow youth graduate Neymar.

=== Real Madrid ===
On 15 June 2018, Real Madrid reached an agreement with Santos for the transfer of Rodrygo, with the player joining Los Blancos in June 2019 and signing until 2025. The rumoured fee was of €45 million, with Santos receiving €40 million as the club owned 80% of his rights with the rest owned by Rodrygo's agents.

On 25 September 2019, Rodrygo made his first team debut and scored his first league goal against Osasuna within a mere minute. He scored his first hat-trick, and gave an assist for the club on 6 November, aged 18 years and 301 days old, against Galatasaray in a 6–0 win in the 2019–20 UEFA Champions League season. The second youngest ever to score a hat-trick in the competition, he is also the first player born in the 21st century to score in the tournament. In his first season, he managed to make 19 appearances, while scoring two goals during the league season, as Real Madrid won the 2019–20 La Liga. On 3 November 2020, Rodrygo scored the winning goal in a 3–2 victory over Inter Milan in the 2020–21 UEFA Champions League.

On 12 April 2022, after coming on as a substitute in the second leg of the 2021–22 UEFA Champions League quarter-final tie against Chelsea, he scored with a volleyed finish to send the game into extra-time, in which Karim Benzema scored the winner from a header, allowing Real Madrid to progress into the semi-finals. On 30 April, Rodrygo helped Real clinch their 35th La Liga title after scoring twice in a 4–0 win against Espanyol at the Bernabéu. On 4 May, while trailing 0–1 (3–5 on aggregate) in the second leg of the Champions League semi-final tie against Manchester City, he scored two goals between the 90th and 91st minutes to level the tie and send the game into extra-time. Benzema scored a penalty to win the game 3–1, allowing Real Madrid to progress into the final against Liverpool with an aggregate score of 6–5 and eventually win the tournament. Following the turnaround win against City and other recent last-minute winning contributions, Rodrygo’s impact on the team was praised despite his young age and he quickly turned into a cult hero at Madrid.

On 18 April 2023, he scored a brace in a 2–0 away victory over Chelsea in the 2022–23 UEFA Champions League quarter-final second leg, which secured his team's qualification to the semi-finals by winning 4–0 on aggregate. On 6 May, he scored two goals for Real Madrid in a 2–1 win over Osasuna in the 2023 Copa del Rey final, to be their 20th title in that competition.

On 2 November 2023, Real Madrid announced that Rodrygo's contract had been extended, with a new expiration date of 30 June 2028.

On 2 March 2026, he suffered a torn ACL during a 1–0 home defeat against Getafe, requiring surgery and an extended recovery period, effectively ruling him out from World Cup 2026.

== International career ==
On 30 March 2017, Rodrygo was called up to Brazil under-17s for the year's Montaigu Tournament. He made his debut in the championship by scoring his side's only goal in a 2–1 loss against Denmark, and netted two more against Cameroon and United States.

On 7 March 2018, Rodrygo and Santos teammate Yuri Alberto were called up to the under-20s, but both were cut from the squad six days later after a request from his club's president.

In November 2019, Rodrygo was called up for the first time to the Brazil senior team, for the Superclásico de las Américas against rivals Argentina in Riyadh, Saudi Arabia. In the 1–0 loss on 15 November, he replaced Willian for the final 20 minutes.

On 7 November 2022, Rodrygo was named in the squad for the 2022 FIFA World Cup. On 9 December, Brazil faced Croatia in the quarter-finals of the World Cup. With the match ending in a 1–1 draw after extra time, the tie would be decided on penalties. Rodrygo took Brazil's first penalty, but his kick was saved by Croatia goalkeeper Dominik Livaković. Brazil were eliminated after Marquinhos' shot hit the post.

In May 2024, Rodrygo was selected for Brazil’s squad for the Copa América.

In March 2026, Rodrygo was expected to be part of Brazil’s squad for the 2026 FIFA World Cup but was ruled out after suffering a torn anterior cruciate ligament (ACL) and lateral meniscus injury in his right knee during a La Liga match for Real Madrid against Getafe. The injury required surgery and sidelined him for several months, ending his 2025–26 season and forcing him to miss the tournament.

== Style of play ==
Considered to be a talented and highly promising young player in the media, Rodrygo's playing style has been likened to that of compatriots and fellow Santos FC graduates Robinho and Neymar due to their pace, technical skill, and similar direct style in attack. Although he does not possess significant physical strength or athleticism, due to his diminutive stature, Rodrygo's low centre of gravity, combined with his dribbling skills and resulting agility, allow him to change direction quickly when in possession of the ball, and beat opponents in one on one situations. He has also been noted for his decision-making, offensive positioning, finishing, link-up play, and creativity, which allows him to hold-up the ball and create space or chances for his teammates, in addition to scoring goals himself. He has also been praised by pundits for his work-rate and willingness to press opponents. While he normally plays as a right-winger, he is a versatile player, who has been used in several other positions, including on the left, and was also used in a free role as a right-sided forward or striker in a 4–3–1–2 formation during the 2023–24 season by manager Carlo Ancelotti; in this position, although he operated in more central areas at times, he was still given the freedom to move out wide to overload the flanks, or switch positions and link-up with Vinícius on the other side of the pitch. Although he is naturally right-footed, Rodrygo does not normally play as an inverted winger on the opposite flank, in contrast to many other wingers of his era.

== Personal life ==
Rodrygo is a Christian.

Rodrygo's father, Eric, is a former professional footballer who played as a right-back in several tiers of Brazilian football, the highest of which being the Série B. Eric had already predicted that Rodrygo was going to be a footballer before he was born. Rodrygo has one younger sister, Ana Julya, who was born in 2018.

In February 2022, Rodrygo and Brazilian beautician Pamella Cristina Costa welcomed twin sons.

In February 2024, Rodrygo partnered with the Juegaterapia Foundation and artist Titocustoms to launch a fundraising campaign against childhood cancer. The initiative, part of the "Everything is going to be fine" campaign, involved auctioning personalized items, including Nike sneakers, a jacket, a ball, and a painting, to support affected children.

== Career statistics ==
=== Club ===
As of match played 2 March 2026

Appearances and goals by club, season and competition
Club	Season	League			State league (Note: Appearances in Campeonato Paulista)		National cup (Note: Includes Copa do Brasil, Copa del Rey)		Continental		Other		Total	
Club	Season	Division	Apps	Goals	Apps	Goals	Apps	Goals	Apps	Goals	Apps	Goals	Apps	Goals
Santos	2017	Série A	2	0	—		—		—		—		2	0
Santos	2018	Série A	35	8	12	3	3	0	8 (Note: Appearances in Copa Libertadores)	1	—		58	12
Santos	2019	Série A	4	1	10	1	6	3	0	0	—		20	5
Santos	Total		41	9	22	4	9	3	8	1	—		80	17
Real Madrid Castilla	2019–20	Segunda División B	3	2	—		—		—		—		3	2
Real Madrid	2019–20	La Liga	19	2	—		1	1	5 (Note: Appearances in UEFA Champions League)	4	1 (Note: Appearance(s) in Supercopa de España)	0	26	7
Real Madrid	2020–21	La Liga	22	1	—		0	0	11	1	0	0	33	2
Real Madrid	2021–22	La Liga	33	4	—		3	0	11	5	2	0	49	9
Real Madrid	2022–23	La Liga	34	9	—		6	4	12	5	5 (Note: One appearance in UEFA Super Cup, two appearances in Supercopa de España, two appearances and one goal in FIFA Club World Cup)	1	57	19
Real Madrid	2023–24	La Liga	34	10	—		2	1	13	5	2	1	51	17
Real Madrid	2024–25	La Liga	30	6	—		5	0	12	5	7 (Note: One appearance in UEFA Super, one appearance and one goal in FIFA Intercontinental Cup, two appearances and two goals in Supercopa de España, three appearances in FIFA Club World Cup)	3	54	14
Real Madrid	2025–26	La Liga	19	1	—		1	0	5	1	2	1	27	3
Real Madrid	2026–27	La Liga	0	0	—		0	0	0	0	0	0	0	0
Real Madrid	Total		191	33	—		18	6	69	26	19	6	297	71
Career total			235	44	22	4	27	9	77	27	19	6	380	90

=== International ===
As of match played 18 November 2025

Appearances and goals by national team and year
National team	Year	Apps	Goals
Brazil	2019	2	0
Brazil	2020	1	0
Brazil	2022	9	1
Brazil	2023	8	3
Brazil	2024	11	3
Brazil	2025	6	2
Total		37	9

As of match played 18 November 2025
Scores and results list Brazil's goal tally first, score column indicates score after each Rodrygo goal.

List of international goals scored by Rodrygo
No.	Date	Venue	Cap	Opponent	Score	Result	Competition
1	1 February 2022	Estádio Mineirão, Belo Horizonte, Brazil	4	Paraguay	4–0	4–0	2022 FIFA World Cup qualification
2	17 June 2023	RCDE Stadium, Barcelona, Spain	14	Guinea	2–0	4–1	Friendly
3	8 September 2023	Estádio Mangueirão, Belém, Brazil	15	Bolivia	1–0	5–1	2026 FIFA World Cup qualification
4	8 September 2023	Estádio Mangueirão, Belém, Brazil	15	Bolivia	3–0	5–1	2026 FIFA World Cup qualification
5	26 March 2024	Santiago Bernabéu, Madrid, Spain	22	Spain	1–2	3–3	Friendly
6	12 June 2024	Camping World Stadium, Orlando, United States	23	United States	1–0	1–1	Friendly
7	6 September 2024	Estádio Couto Pereira, Curitiba, Brazil	28	Ecuador	1–0	1–0	2026 FIFA World Cup qualification
8	10 October 2025	Seoul World Cup Stadium, Seoul, South Korea	34	South Korea	2–0	5–0	Friendly
9	10 October 2025	Seoul World Cup Stadium, Seoul, South Korea	34	South Korea	4–0	5–0	Friendly

== Honours ==
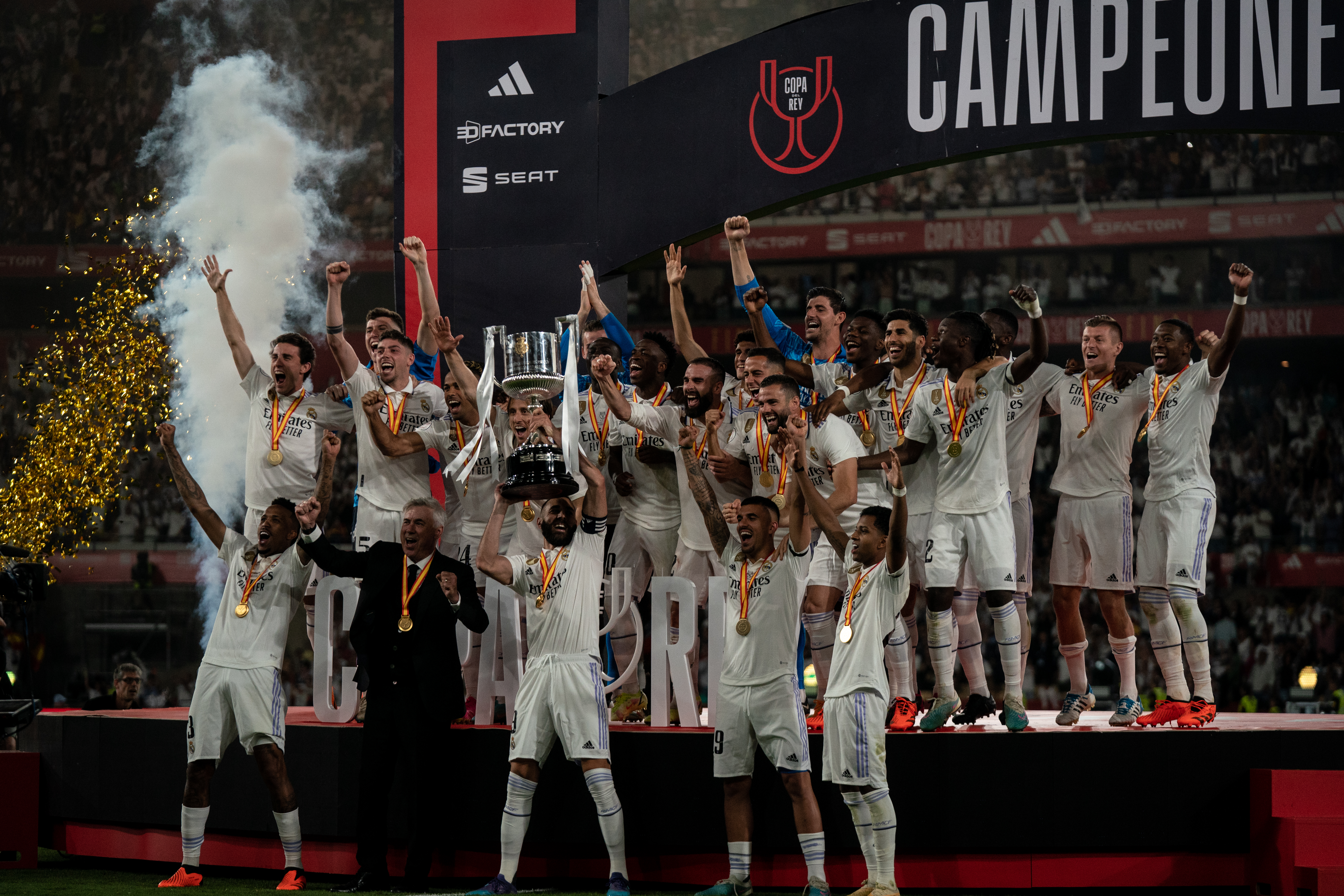
Rodrygo winner Copa del Rey with Real Madrid in 2023.

Real Madrid

- La Liga: 2019–20, 2021–22, 2023–24
- Copa del Rey: 2022–23
- Supercopa de España: 2020, 2022, 2024
- UEFA Champions League: 2021–22, 2023–24
- UEFA Super Cup: 2022, 2024
- FIFA Club World Cup: 2022
- FIFA Intercontinental Cup: 2024

Individual

- Campeonato Paulista Best Newcomer: 2018
- Goal.com NxGN: 2020
- IFFHS Men's Youth (U20) World Team: 2020, 2021
- IFFHS CONMEBOL Best Youth Player (U20): 2021
- La Liga U23 Player of the Month: November 2023
- IFFHS Men's CONMEBOL Team: 2024
