= Aguemoune =

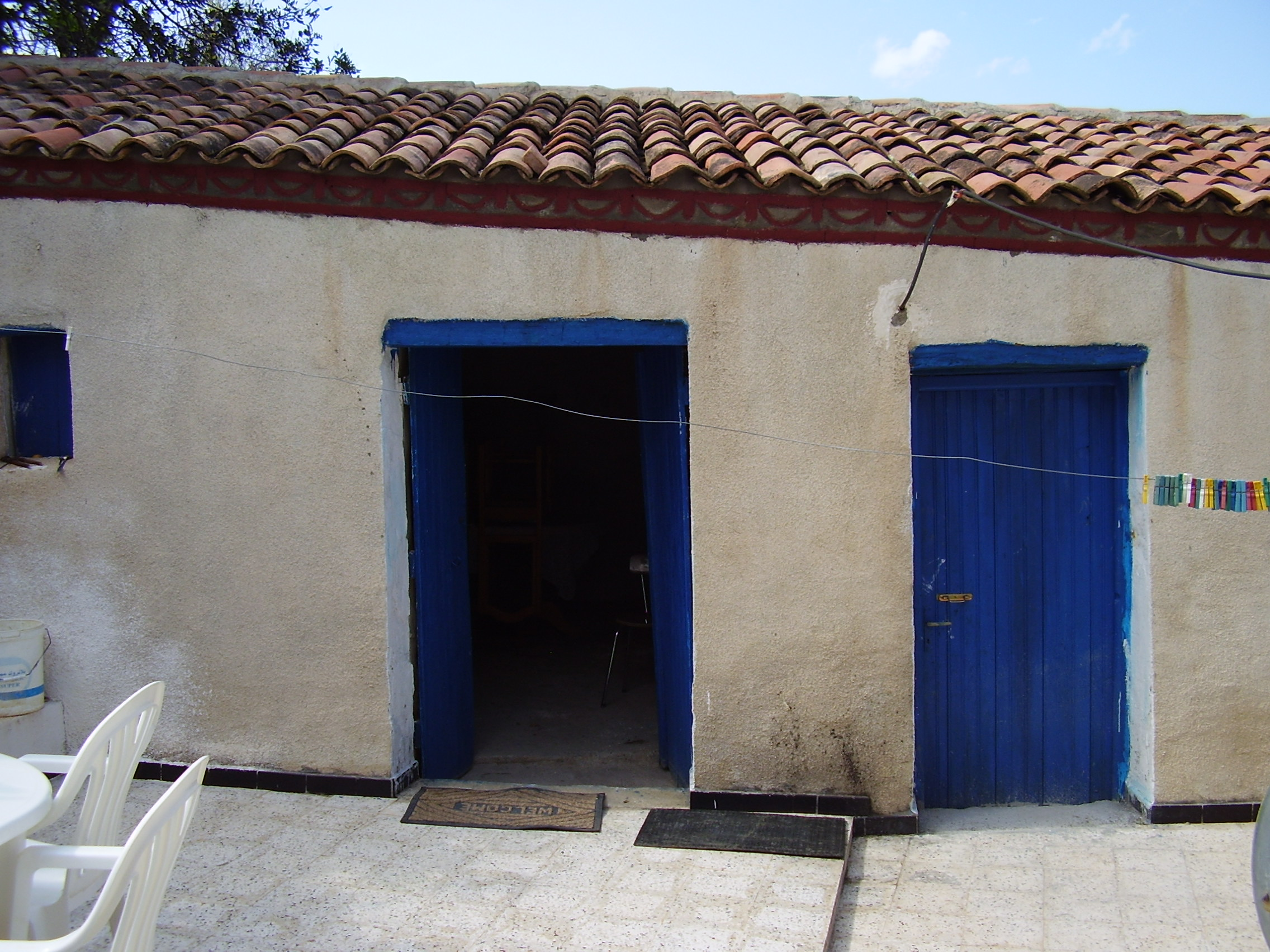
- Birthplace of Zinedine Zidane's father

- Location within Algeria
- Country: Algeria
- Province: Béjaïa
- District: Tichy District
- Commune: Boukhelifa
- Time zone: UTC+1 (West Africa Time)

Aguemoune (Kabyle: Agemmun) is a village in the Boukhelifa commune in Béjaïa Province, located in the Kabylie region of Algeria.

== Notable people ==
It is noted as the birthplace of Smaïl and Malika Zidane, parents of footballer Zinedine Zidane.
