= Zinedine Zidane =

French football player and manager (born 1972)

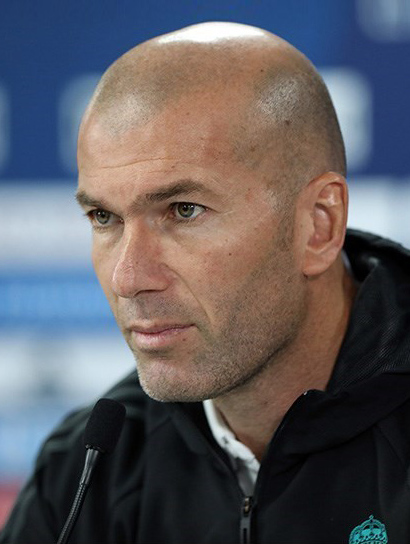
- Zidane in 2017

Personal information
- Full name: Zinedine Yazid Zidane
- Date of birth: 23 June 1972 (age 54)
- Place of birth: Marseille, France
- Height: 1.85 m (6 ft 1 in)
- Position: Attacking midfielder

Team information
- Current team: France (head coach)

Youth career
- 1981–1982: Foresta
- 1982–1983: Saint-Henri
- 1983–1987: Septèmes-les-Vallons
- 1987–1989: Cannes

Senior career*
Years	Team	Apps	(Gls)
1989–1992	Cannes	61	(6)
1992–1996	Bordeaux	139	(28)
1996–2001	Juventus	151	(24)
2001–2006	Real Madrid	155	(37)
Total		506	(95)

International career
1987–1988	France U16		
1988–1989	France U17	4	(1)
1989–1990	France U18	6	(0)
1990–1994	France U21	20	(3)
1994–2006	France	108	(31)

Managerial career
- 2014–2016: Real Madrid Castilla
- 2016–2018: Real Madrid
- 2019–2021: Real Madrid
- 2026–: France
Medal record
Men's football
Representing France
FIFA World Cup
Winner	1998
Runner-up	2006
UEFA European Championship
Winner	2000
- * Club domestic league appearances and goals

Zinedine Yazid Zidane (Note: Zidane's first name Zinedine is also written as Zinédine in French context.) (French: [zinedin zidan]; born 23 June 1972), popularly known as Zizou (French: [zizu]), is a French professional football manager and former player who played as an attacking midfielder. Since July 2026, he is the head coach of the France national team.

Widely regarded as one of the greatest players of all time, Zidane was a playmaker renowned for his elegance, vision, passing, and ball control. He received many individual accolades as a player, including being named FIFA World Player of the Year in 1998, 2000 and 2003, and winning the 1998 Ballon d'Or. He coached his former club Real Madrid in two separate stints between 2016 and 2021, winning multiple domestic and international club trophies.

Zidane started his career at Cannes before establishing himself as one of the best players in the French Ligue 1 at Bordeaux. In 1996, he moved to Italian club Juventus, where he won two Serie A titles and played in consecutive UEFA Champions League finals in 1997 and 1998. He moved to Real Madrid for a world-record fee at the time of €77.5 million in 2001, which remained a record for the next eight years. In Spain, Zidane won several trophies, including a La Liga title and the Champions League. In the 2002 Champions League final, he scored a left-foot volleyed winner that is considered one of the greatest goals in football history. In 2012 and 2017, respectively, Zidane was named in Real Madrid's and Juventus's greatest XI of all time.

Capped 108 times by France, Zidane won the 1998 FIFA World Cup, scoring a brace in the final, and was named in the All-Star team. This triumph made him a national hero in France and he received the Legion of Honour in 1998. He won UEFA Euro 2000 and was named Player of the Tournament. He also received the Golden Ball as Player of the Tournament at the 2006 World Cup, despite his infamous sending off in the final against Italy for headbutting Marco Materazzi in the chest. He retired as the fourth-most capped player in French history.

In 2004, he was named in the FIFA 100, a list of the world's greatest living players compiled by Pelé, and in the same year was named the best European footballer of the past 50 years in the UEFA Golden Jubilee Poll. Zidane is one of eleven players to have won the World Cup, the Champions League, and the Ballon d'Or. He was the ambassador for Qatar's successful bid to stage the 2022 World Cup, the first Arab country to host the tournament.

After retiring as a player, Zidane began his coaching career at Real Madrid Castilla. He remained in the position for two years, before managing the first team in 2016. In his initial three seasons, Zidane became the first and only coach to win the Champions League three consecutive times. He also won the UEFA Super Cup and FIFA Club World Cup twice each, as well as a La Liga title and a Supercopa de España. This success led to Zidane being named Best FIFA Men's Coach in 2017. He resigned in 2018, but returned to the club in 2019, and won another La Liga title and a Supercopa de España, before leaving again in 2021. In 2026, he returned to coaching, succeeding Didier Deschamps as the new head coach of the France national team.

== Early life and career ==
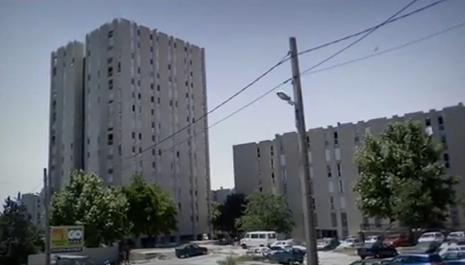
La Castellane, in the northwestern edge of Marseille, where Zidane was born in 1972

Zinedine Yazid Zidane was born on 23 June 1972 in La Castellane, a neighbourhood in the 16th arrondissement of Marseille, in Southern France. He is the youngest of five siblings born to Algerian parents Smaïl and Malika, who had immigrated to Paris from the village of Aguemoune in the Berber-speaking region of Kabylia in 1953, before the start of the Algerian War. The family, which had settled in the city's tough northern districts of Barbès and Saint-Denis, found little work in the region, and in the mid-1960s, moved to the northern Marseille suburb of La Castellane. In an interview with Esquire magazine, he stated:

I have an affinity with the Arabic world. I have it in my blood, via my parents. I'm very proud of being French, but also very proud of having these roots and this diversity.

His father worked as a warehouseman and security guard at a department store, often on the night shift, while his mother was a housewife. The family lived a reasonably comfortable life by the standards of the neighbourhood, which was notorious throughout Marseille for its high crime and unemployment rates. Zidane credits his strict upbringing and his father as the "guiding light" in his career.

It was in Castellane where Zidane had his earliest introduction in football, joining in at the age of five in football games that the neighbourhood's children played on the Place Tartane, an 80-by-12-yard plaza that served as the main square of the housing complex. In July 2011, Zidane named former Marseille players Blaž Slišković, Enzo Francescoli and Jean-Pierre Papin as his idols while growing up. At the age of ten, Zidane got his first player's licence after joining the junior team of a local club from Castellane by the name of Saint-Henri. After spending a year and a half at Saint-Henri, Zidane joined Septèmes-les-Vallons when the Septèmes coach Robert Centenero convinced the club's director to get Zidane. Zidane stayed with Septèmes until the age of 14, at which time he was selected to attend a three-day training camp at the CREPS (Regional Centre for Sports and Physical Education) in Aix-en-Provence, one of several such footballing institutes run by the French Football Federation. It was here that Zidane was spotted by Cannes scout and former player Jean Varraud, who recommended him to the training centre director of the club. As a 14-year-old watching the 1986 World Cup, the performance of Diego Maradona left an indelible mark on him, with Zidane stating Maradona "was on another level".

== Club career ==
=== Cannes ===
"He'd go past one, two, three, five, six players – it was sublime. His feet spoke with the ball"

— Jean Varraud, former player who discovered Zidane.

Zidane went to Cannes for a six-week stay, but ended up remaining at the club for four years to play at the professional level. Having left his family to join Cannes, he was invited by Cannes Director Jean-Claude Elineau to leave the dormitory he shared with 20 other trainees and to come and stay with him and his family. Zidane later said that, while living with the Elineaus, he found equilibrium.

It was at Cannes where Zidane's first coaches noticed that he was raw and sensitive, prone to attack spectators who insulted his race or family. His first coach, Jean Varraud, encouraged him to channel his anger and focus on his own game. Zidane spent his first weeks at Cannes mainly on cleaning duty as a punishment for punching an opponent who mocked his ghetto origins. The occasional violence that he would display throughout his career was shaped by an internal conflict of being an Algerian-Frenchman suspended between cultures, and surviving the tough streets of La Castellane where he grew up.

Zidane made his professional debut with Cannes on 18 May 1989 in a French Division 1 match against Nantes. He scored his first goal for the club on 10 February 1991 also against Nantes in a 2–1 win. After the match, during a party for all the Cannes players, Zidane was given a car by Cannes chairman Alain Pedretti, who had promised him one the day he scored his first goal for the club. On the pitch, Zidane displayed extraordinary technique on the ball, offering glimpses of the talent that would take him to the top of the world game. In his first full season with Cannes, the club secured its first ever European football berth by qualifying for the UEFA Cup, after finishing fourth in the league. This remains the club's highest finish in the top flight since getting relegated for the first time from the first division in the 1948–49 season.

=== Bordeaux ===
Zidane was transferred to Girondins de Bordeaux in the 1992–93 season, winning the 1995 Intertoto Cup after beating Karlsruher SC and finishing runner-up against Bayern Munich in the 1995–96 UEFA Cup during his four years with the club. He played a set of midfield combinations with Bixente Lizarazu and Christophe Dugarry, which would become the trademark of both Bordeaux and the 1998 French national team. In 1995, Blackburn Rovers manager Kenny Dalglish had expressed interest in signing both Zidane and Dugarry, to which club owner Jack Walker reportedly replied, "Why do you want to sign Zidane when we have Tim Sherwood?" Also toward the beginning of the 1996 season, according to football agent Barry Silkman, Zidane was offered to Newcastle United for £1.2 million, but the club turned down the offer after watching him, claiming that he was not good enough for the English First Division. In 1996, Zidane received the award for Ligue 1 Player of the Year.

=== Juventus ===
"He is a special player. He creates space where there is none. No matter where he gets the ball or how it comes to him, he can get out of trouble. His imagination and his technique are amazing"

— Juventus teammate Edgar Davids on Zidane's ability.

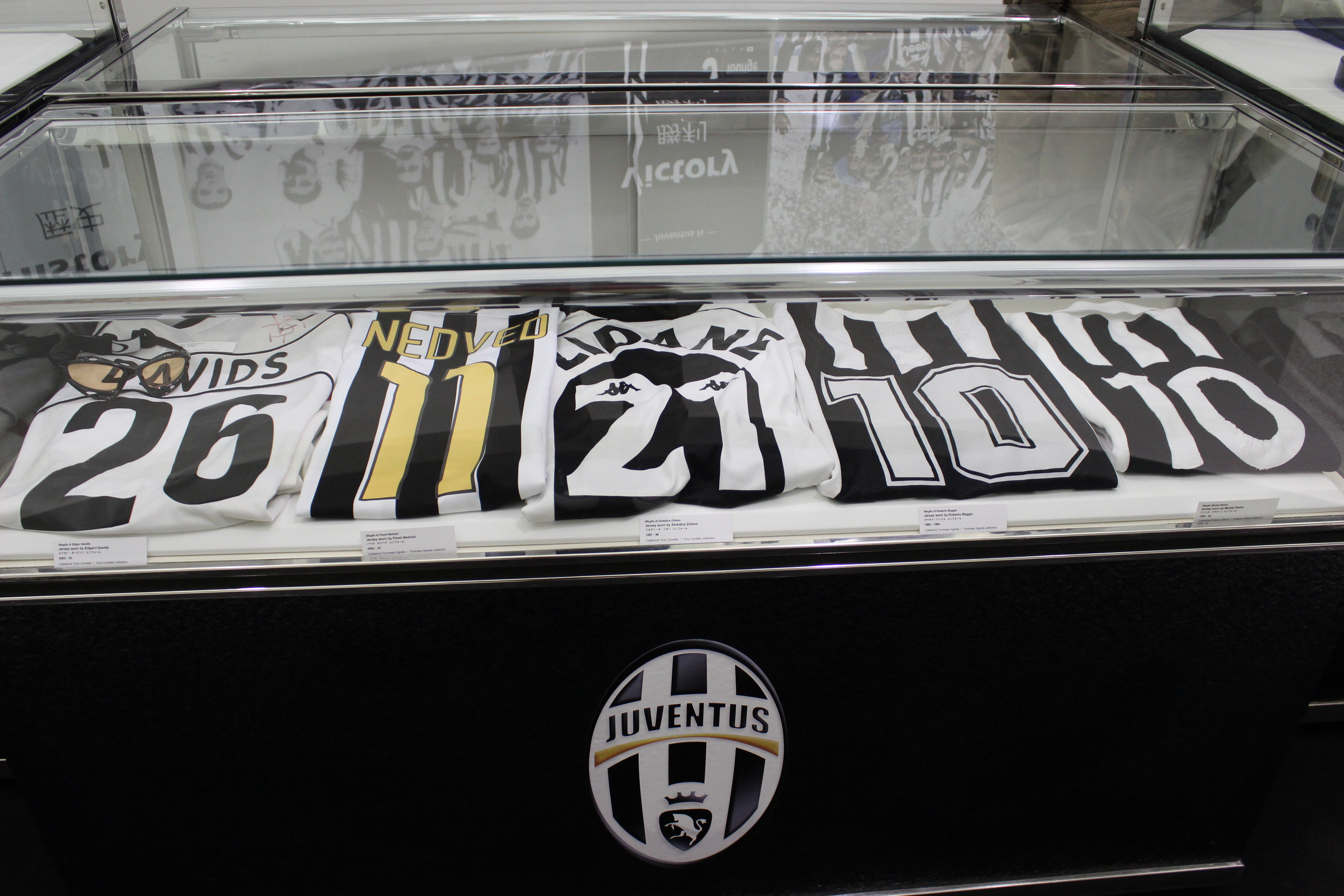
Zidane's Juventus jersey (center) at the Juventus Museum next to kits of (from left to right) Edgar Davids, Pavel Nedvěd, Roberto Baggio and Michel Platini

After a series of stand out performances for both Bordeaux and France, Zidane had offers to join Europe's top clubs in the spring of 1996, deciding on a move to UEFA Champions League winners Juventus during the close season. Zidane's impact in Italy was immediate, winning the 1996–97 Serie A title and the 1996 Intercontinental Cup. He was named Serie A Foreign Footballer of the Year in his first season. Zidane's growing status in the sport saw him chosen in a European XI to face a World XI – featuring a forward line of Ronaldo and Gabriel Batistuta – in December 1997.

As the playmaker at Juve, Zidane played just behind forward Alessandro Del Piero, with Del Piero recalling, "Zidane had an extraordinary talent, which contributed to his sole interest in helping the team. He was not a selfish player. He had a unique ability to be a great and to be a team player. I was lucky to play with him." He lost in the 1997 UEFA Champions League Final 3–1 to Borussia Dortmund when he was unable to make an impression against the close marking of Paul Lambert.

The following season, Zidane scored seven goals in 32 matches in the league to help Juventus win the 1997–98 Serie A and thus retain the Scudetto. In Europe, Juventus made their third consecutive UEFA Champions League Final appearance, but lost the game 1–0 to Real Madrid. In 1998, Zidane was named FIFA World Player of the Year, and won the Ballon d'Or. Juventus finished second in the 2000–01 Serie A, but were eliminated in the group stage of the Champions League, after Zidane was banned for head-butting Hamburger SV player Jochen Kientz. In 2001, Zidane was named Serie A Foreign Footballer of the Year for the second time.

=== Real Madrid ===
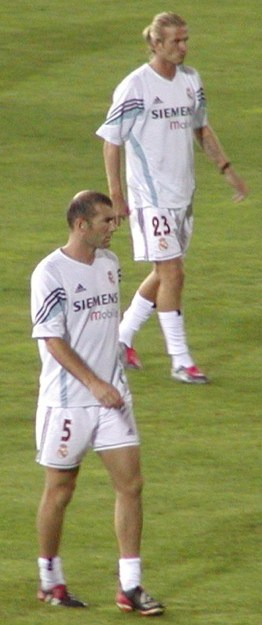
Zidane with teammate David Beckham in 2003

In 2001, Zidane joined Real Madrid for a world-record fee of 150 billion Italian lire, (about €77.5 million by fixed exchange rate; a reported 12.8 billion pesetas) in instalments, and signed a four-year contract. The latest addition to the Galácticos era of global stars signed by Real Madrid every year, in his first season at the club Zidane scored a famous match-winning goal, a volley hit with his weaker left foot from the edge of the 18-yard box, in Madrid's 2–1 win over Bayer Leverkusen in the 2002 UEFA Champions League Final. The goal has been cited as one of the greatest in Champions League history. The magnitude of the strike saw Zidane produce one of his most emotional goal celebrations as he ran toward the touchline with mouth wide open, screaming in delight.

Zinedine Zidane, 18 yards out, watching and waiting, adjusts his body and, in one, smooth movement, pirouettes and catches it full on the volley with his left foot. It flies past Hans-Jörg Butt. It was the moment of Zidane's apotheosis, more so than the 1998 World Cup final, because of the moment's grace and beauty, because of his control of everything around him. He was Bruce Lee in slow motion while kung-fu chaos reigned around.

— Rory Smith in The Telegraph, Top 20 sporting moments of the decade: Zinedine Zidane's Champions League final winner.

"He dominates the ball, he is a walking spectacle and he plays as if he had silk gloves on each foot. He makes it worthwhile going to the stadium – he's one of the best I have ever seen."

— Alfredo Di Stéfano on Zidane after he was named World Player of the Year in 2003.

The next season, Zidane helped Real Madrid to win the 2002–03 La Liga, starring alongside Luís Figo in midfield, and was named the FIFA World Player of the Year for the third time. In 2004, fans voted him as the best European footballer of the previous 50 years in UEFA's fiftieth-anniversary Golden Jubilee Poll.

While Zidane's final season of club football ended without a trophy, he enjoyed success on a personal note by scoring his first hat-trick, against Sevilla, in a 4–2 win in January 2006. He ended the season for Real Madrid as their second highest goalscorer and assists provider behind teammates Ronaldo and David Beckham respectively, with nine goals and ten assists in 28 games. On 7 May 2006, Zidane, who had announced his plans to retire after the 2006 World Cup, played his farewell match and scored in a 3–3 draw with Villarreal. The squad wore commemorative shirts with ZIDANE 2001–2006 below the club logo. The 80,000 fans inside the Santiago Bernabéu held up a banner reading, "Thanks for the magic."

In 2012, Zidane featured for Madrid in an All Stars Match against Manchester United which resulted in a 3–2 win for Real. In April 2013, he was named by Marca as a member of the "Best foreign eleven in Real Madrid's history."

== International career ==
Both France and Algeria consider Zidane a citizen. It was rumoured that coach Abdelhamid Kermali denied Zidane a position for the Algerian squad because he felt the young midfielder was not fast enough. Zidane dismissed the rumour in a 2005 interview, saying that he would have been ineligible to play for Algeria because he had already played for France.

Zidane was a member of the French under-21 squad that won a bronze medal at the 1993 Mediterranean Games in Languedoc-Roussillon. He earned his first cap with France as a substitute in a friendly against the Czech Republic on 17 August 1994, which ended in a 2–2 draw after Zidane scored twice to help France erase a 2–0 deficit. After Eric Cantona was handed a year-long suspension in January 1995 for assaulting a fan, Zidane took over the playmaker position.

=== Euro 1996 ===
Despite not being at his best during the tournament, France reached the last four. Zidane was not yet fully established in the French team and his level was quite average during the whole event, but he managed to score in the penalty shootout in both the quarter-final and semi-final. France was eliminated in the Euro 96 semi-finals in a penalty shootout against the Czech Republic.

=== 1998 World Cup ===
Following France's World Cup win, an image of Zidane was projected on the Arc de Triomphe (pictured) along with the words "Merci Zizou".

The 1998 FIFA World Cup was the first World Cup that Zidane participated in; the tournament was held in his home country, France. The French team won all three games in the group stage, with Zidane setting up Christophe Dugarry's goal in the opening match against South Africa from a corner, and contributing to Thierry Henry's opening goal in the second match against Saudi Arabia. He was sent off in the latter match for a stamp on Fuad Anwar, becoming the first French player to receive a red card in a World Cup Finals match. Without their playmaker, France proceeded to win 1–0 in the round of sixteen game against Paraguay and, on his return to the side, defeated Italy 4–3 on penalties after a goalless draw in the quarter-finals, with Zidane netting the first spot kick in the shoot-out. France then defeated Croatia 2–1 in the semi-final. Although Zidane had played a role in the team's accomplishments, he had yet to score a goal at the World Cup.

Zidane and France went on to play against defending champions and favourites Brazil at the Stade de France in the 1998 FIFA World Cup Final. France dominated Brazil from the kick-off, with Zidane scoring two similar goals, both headers from corner kicks taken by Emmanuel Petit and Youri Djorkaeff. Courtesy of Zidane's two goals, France went into the half-time break up 2–0. Petit added a third goal deep in stoppage time to seal the 3–0 win and France's first World Cup. Named man of the match, Zidane became an instant national hero and would receive the Legion of Honour later that year. More than one million people lined the Champs-Élysées in Paris, with celebrations centred around the Arc de Triomphe.

=== Euro 2000 ===
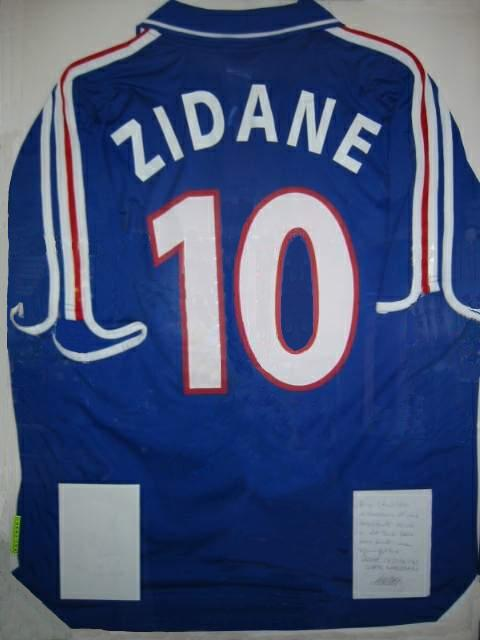
Zidane's France jersey from Euro 2000

Two years later France won Euro 2000, becoming the first team to hold both the World Cup and the European Championship since West Germany in 1974. Zidane finished with two goals, a bending free kick against Spain in the quarter-final and the golden goal in the semi-final against Portugal with a penalty. He also set-up Henry's goal in a 3–0 win over Denmark in their opening group match. UEFA named Zidane Player of the Tournament.

Zidane himself believes he was at his peak during the tournament, while the UEFA website states, "In Belgium and the Netherlands, Zidane dominated a major championship in a way no individual had managed since Diego Maradona in 1986. From the opening game against Denmark to the final against Italy, 'Zizou' shone brightly, casting a spell on his opponents with clever flicks, mesmerising stepovers, slaloming runs and masterful vision."

=== 2002 World Cup ===
As reigning world and European champions, France entered the 2002 World Cup in Japan/Korea as favourites but a thigh injury sustained in a warm up match before the tournament prevented Zidane from playing in France's first two matches and without their talisman, the French team failed to score in either match, losing 1–0 against Senegal, and holding Uruguay to a goalless draw. He was rushed back prematurely for the third game against Denmark, despite not being fully fit, but could not prevent France from losing 2–0, and being ignominiously eliminated in the group stage without scoring a single goal; the worst performance by a defending champion in the history of the competition.

=== Euro 2004 ===
At Euro 2004, France topped their group with wins over England and Switzerland. In the opening match against England, Zidane scored a free kick and penalty in stoppage time to turn impending defeat into a 2–1 victory. In the following group match against Croatia, his free-kick was deflected by defender Igor Tudor, who scored an own goal; the match ended in a 2–2 draw. In France's final group match, Zidane opened the scoring in an eventual 3–1 win over Switzerland. However, France were knocked out in the quarter-finals by eventual champions Greece in a surprise 1–0 loss. After France's elimination, Zidane announced his retirement from international football.

=== 2006 World Cup ===
What I am going to say may sound over the top, but it's the truth. God exists and he has returned to the France team.

— Thierry Henry, on Zidane's return.
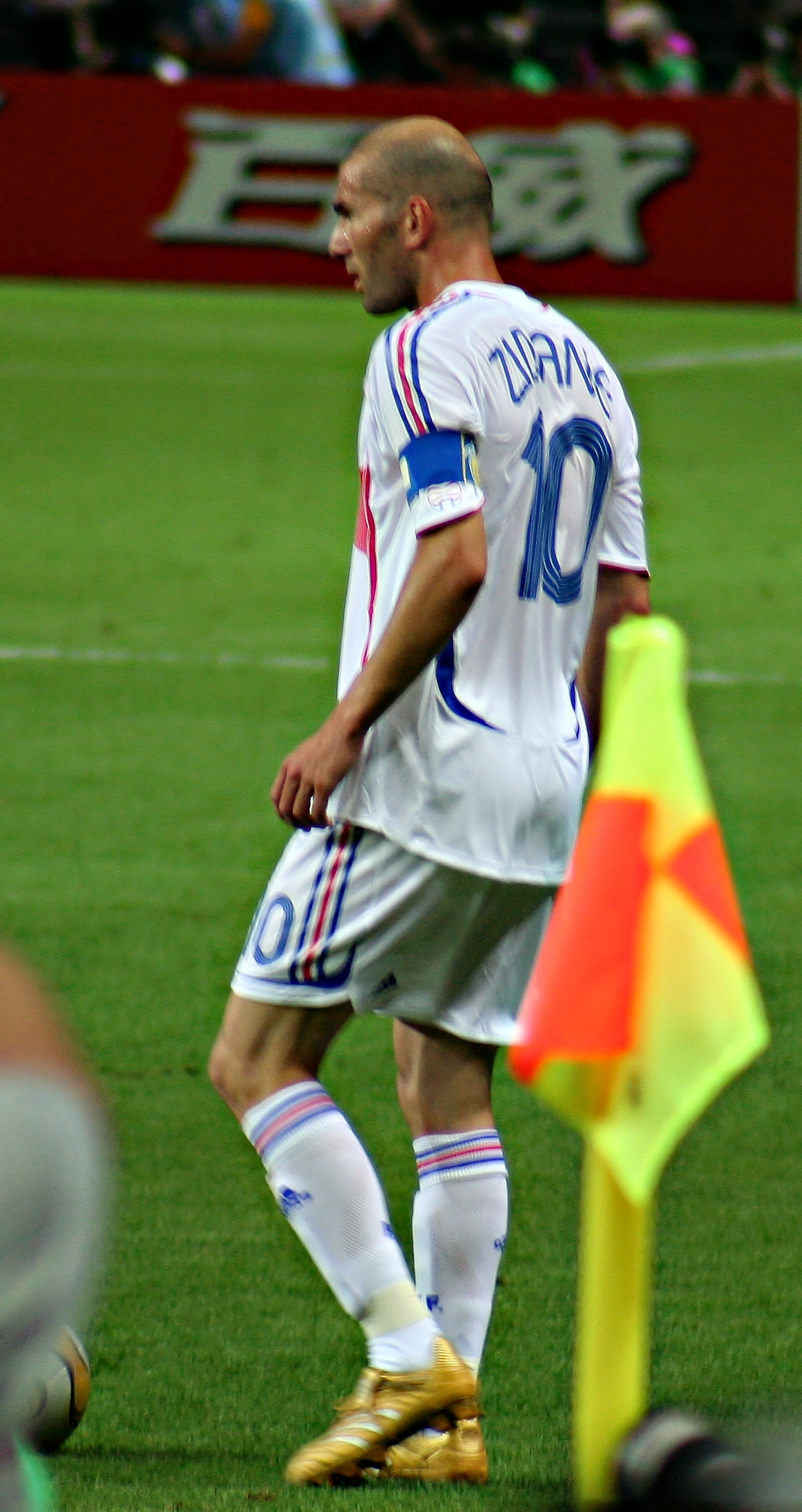
Zidane during the 2006 World Cup final

With the mass retirement of veteran key players such as Bixente Lizarazu, Marcel Desailly, Claude Makélélé and Lilian Thuram, France struggled to qualify for the 2006 World Cup. At the urging of coach Raymond Domenech, Zidane came out of retirement and was immediately reinstated as team captain. Zidane, along with Thuram and Makélélé, made his competitive return for France in a 3–0 win over the Faroe Islands on 3 September 2005. The trio helped France rise from fourth place to win their qualifying group. On 27 May 2006, Zidane earned his hundredth cap for France in a 1–0 friendly win over Mexico, in what would also be his last match at the Stade de France. Zidane became France's fourth player to reach 100 caps, after Desailly, Thuram and Didier Deschamps.

France had a slow start to the 2006 Finals and, after being suspended for the third match of the group stage, Zidane returned to set up a goal for Patrick Vieira and score one himself in the second round match against Spain. In the quarter-final France held Brazil to just one shot on goal in the rematch of the 1998 final. Zidane assisted Thierry Henry's deciding goal and was named Man of the Match by FIFA. France faced Portugal in the semi-final and, as in Brussels six years earlier; once again, Zidane's penalty kick decided the contest and sent France to another major final.

Having already announced he was to retire after the expiration of his Real Madrid contract at the end of the 2005–06 season, the world of football already knew Zidane's second World Cup final was to be the last match of his career. Seven minutes into the 2006 World Cup final in Berlin, Zidane put France ahead with a Panenka-style penalty kick which struck the crossbar and bounced just over the goal line to become only the fourth player in World Cup history to score in two different finals, along with Pelé, Paul Breitner, and Vavá, in addition to being tied for first place with Vavá, Pelé and Geoff Hurst with three World Cup final goals apiece, a record at the time, later broken by compatriot Kylian Mbappé in 2022. He almost scored a second goal during the first period of extra time but his header was saved by Italy's goalkeeper Gianluigi Buffon. Zidane was then sent off in the 110th minute of the game after headbutting Marco Materazzi in the chest, so he did not participate in the penalty shootout, which Italy won 5–3. This marked the 14th overall expulsion of Zidane's career, and joined him with Cameroon's Rigobert Song as the only players ever to be sent off during two separate World Cup tournaments. He also became the fourth player red-carded in a World Cup final, in addition to being the first sent off in extra time. Zidane's actions made headlines all over the world, while in France Le Figaro called his head-butt "odious", and the front page of L'Équipe asked, "What should we tell our children, for whom you have become an example for ever? ... How could that happen to a man like you?" Zidane had received plaudits for his performances during the tournament, with Pep Guardiola writing he exerts so much influence on the team that "France are never disorganised". The day after the final, Zidane was awarded the Golden Ball as the player of the tournament.

"The match you played last night was full of talent and professionalism. I know that you are sad and disappointed but what I want to tell you is that the whole country is extremely proud of you. You have honoured the country with your exceptional qualities and your fantastic fighting spirit, which was your strength in difficult times, but also in winning times."

— President of France, Jacques Chirac, pays tribute to Zidane in Paris after the 2006 World Cup.

Upon his return to France, the Place de la Concorde in Paris was filled with thousands of fans waving flags and rhythmically chanting "Zizou! Zizou!", and tributes were led by the French president Jacques Chirac. Chirac's words reflected the feeling of the French public, with polls done in the immediate wake of the incident showing support for Zidane: 61% of French people said they had already forgiven him for his actions while 52% said they understood them. According to French journalist Philippe Auclair, Zidane's performances in the knock-out rounds were "ranked among his finest in a blue shirt." As the player of the tournament, Zidane had given the team hope, with the French daily newspaper Libération stating, "For a month, France was dreaming with Zidane." Zidane remained an icon to the French public, and one French writer stated, "It's good for us to see our national hero is fallible." It was later revealed through interviews that Marco Materazzi had insulted Zidane's sister, which led to Zidane's heightened anger and reaction. In 2010, Zidane said that he would "rather die than apologize" to Materazzi for the headbutt in the final, but also admitted that he "could never have lived with himself" had he been allowed to remain on the pitch and help France win the match. He later said, "If you look at the fourteen red cards I had in my career, twelve of them were a result of provocation. This isn't justification, this isn't an excuse, but my passion, temper and blood made me react."

Following his red card in the final, Zidane retired from professional football and confirmed that he would not go back on his decision. He was sentenced by FIFA to complete three days of community service with children in one of FIFA's humanitarian projects rather than three-match suspension for the red card given that he already retired. Zidane ended up tying with Brazil's Cafu for the record for most cards given in World Cup matches, with six.

== Retirement ==
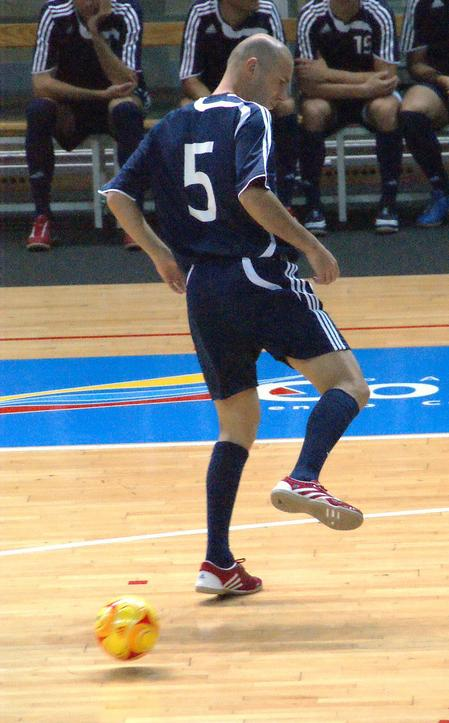
Zidane playing a backheel during a game of futsal in 2008

Since his retirement, Zidane has regularly played for the Real Madrid Veterans team. He has also made several futsal appearances. In 2015 he played in a futsal tournament in Dubai, United Arab Emirates, during which an opposition player received a yellow card to much amusement for taking an in-match selfie with Zidane. In an interview in June 2008, Zidane stated that he wanted to return to football, but that he had no immediate plans to do so.

On 1 June 2009, Zidane was announced as the advisor to the president after Florentino Pérez was named president of Real Madrid for the second time. He, along with general director Jorge Valdano and sporting director Miguel Pardeza, were to be the key decisionmakers on the sporting side of the club. After France's dismal campaign in the 2010 World Cup, Zidane said that he did not plan to move into coaching any time soon.

Qatar's 2022 World Cup bid committee announced in September 2010 that Zidane had been appointed as an ambassador for Qatar's attempt to host the 2022 World Cup. After FIFA announced on 2 December 2010 that Qatar had won the bid to host the 2022 World Cup, Zidane stated that he was "very pleased" with the outcome. Zidane spoke of the message he was trying to convey in the campaign: "I was saying that football belonged to the whole world. I'm proud to have made my contribution to a new country getting the World Cup. Qatar and the entire Middle East as a whole deserves this event and that makes me happy. It's a victory for the Arab world." Zidane has supported two Olympic bids for Paris, including the 2012 Summer Olympics which was narrowly won by London, and later Paris' successful bid for the 2024 Summer Olympics where he served as a torchbearer for the opening ceremony. Paris also hosted the 2024 Summer Paralympics.

=== Philanthropy ===
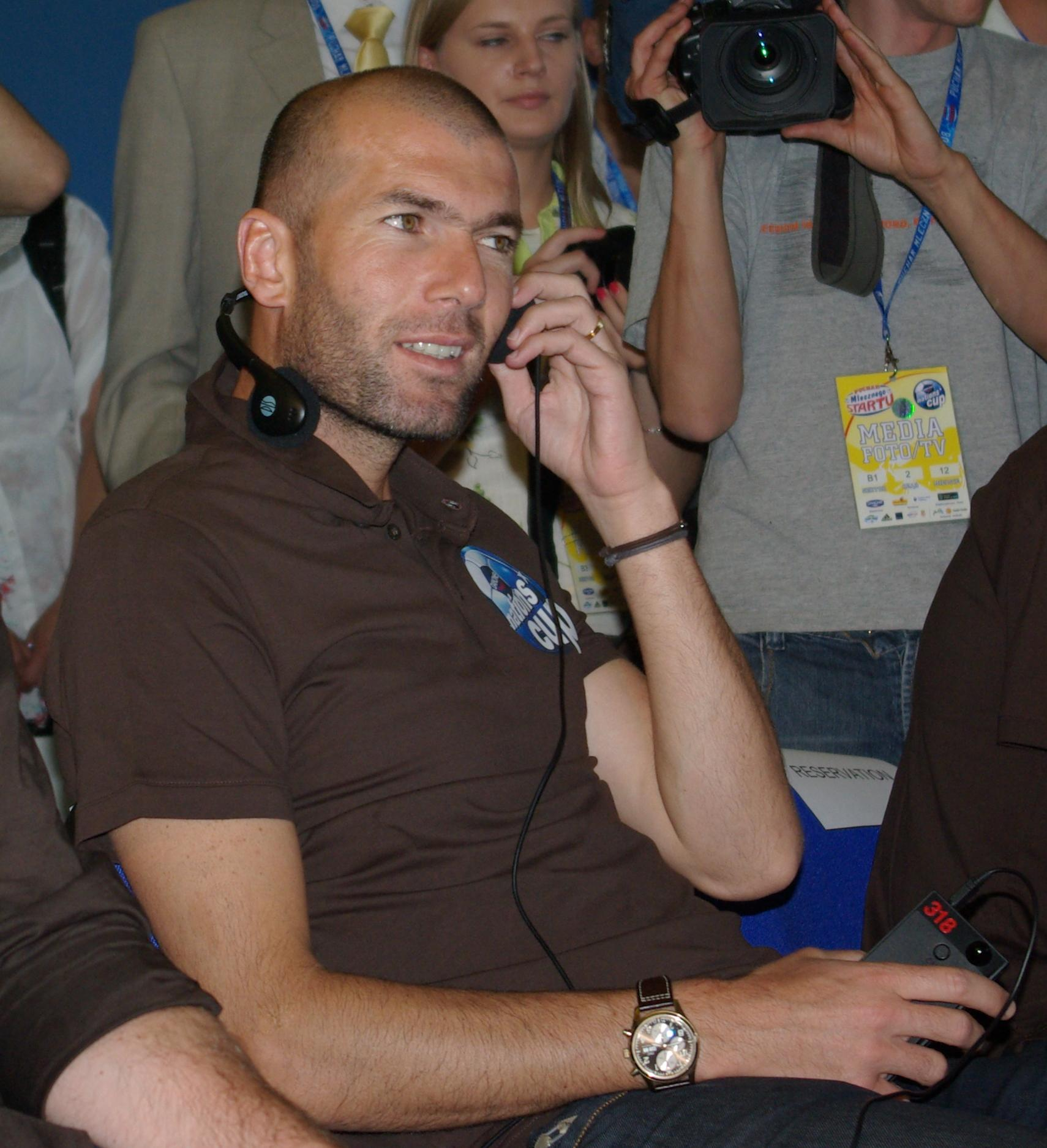
Zidane at the Danone Nations Cup, 2008. A football tournament involving 2.5 million children from over 11,000 clubs from around the globe, Zidane is its ambassador.

On 24 February 2007, before a crowd of 10,000 fans at a match in northern Thailand for the Keuydaroon children's AIDS charity, Zidane scored the first goal and set up the second for a Malaysian teammate as the match ended 2–2. The event raised ฿260,000 ($7,750). This money paid for the building of two schools and 16 three-bedroom houses.

On 19 November 2008, Zidane took part in the fifth annual Match Against Poverty in Málaga, Spain, which also ended in a 2–2 draw; he went scoreless but set up his team's second goal. He and Ronaldo, who collaborated in conceiving the yearly event to benefit the United Nations Development Programme, regularly captain their respective teams consisting of active footballers, other professional athletes and celebrities. Zidane, a UN Goodwill Ambassador since 2001, stated before the game that "everyone can do something to make the world a better place."

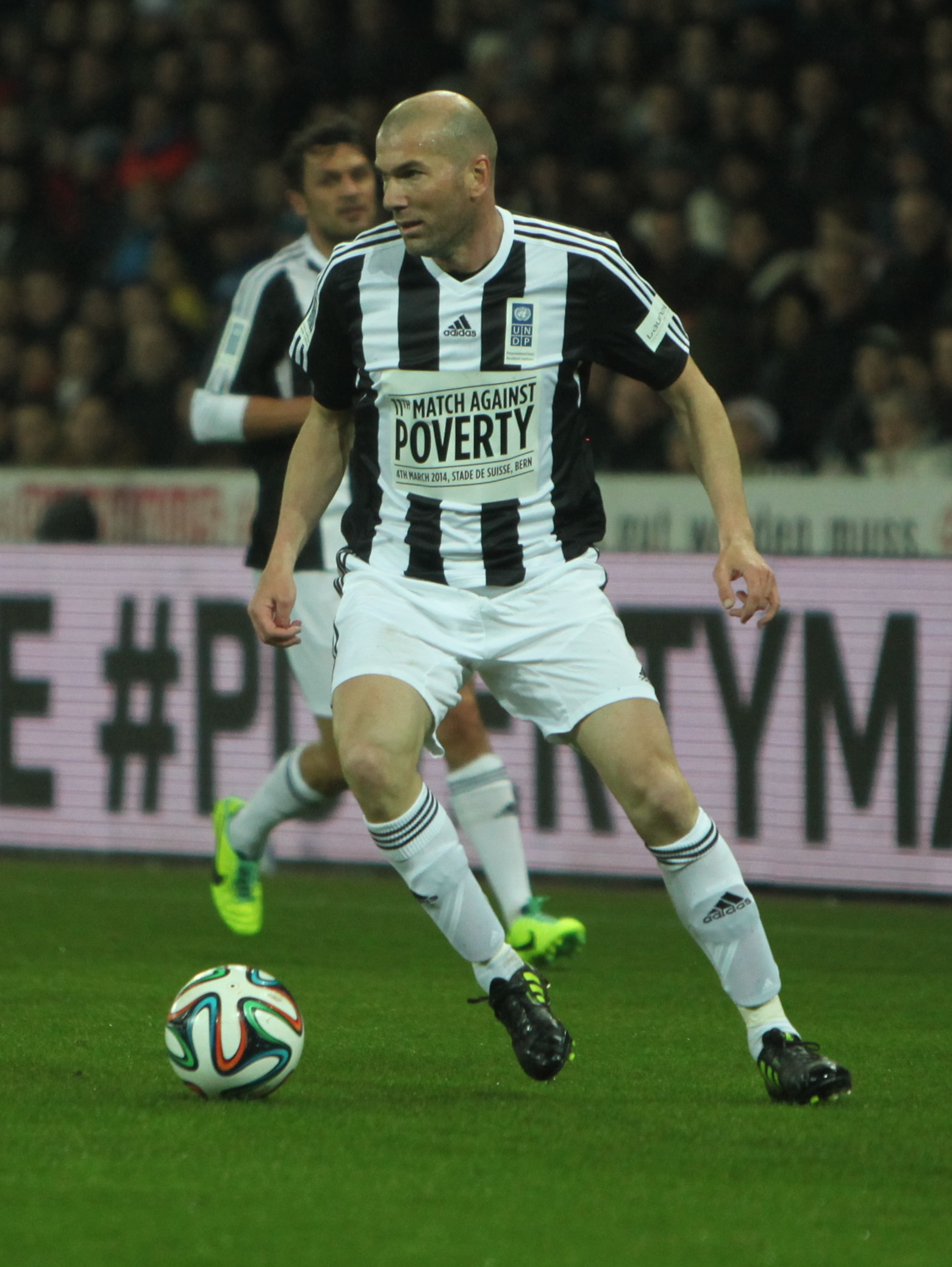
Zidane in the Match Against Poverty in Bern, March 2014

In June and July 2009, Zidane toured across Canada with stops in Toronto, Montreal and Vancouver. Although billed as Zidane and "Friends", the likes of which included Fabien Barthez and Samuel Eto'o, the exhibition matches featured local players. Some proceeds were given to UNICEF.

On 6 June 2010, Zidane took part in the biennial charity event Soccer Aid. He played for the Rest of the World team, managed by former Liverpool and Celtic forward Kenny Dalglish against England alongside former Real Madrid teammate Luís Figo and Celtic legend Henrik Larsson. He played against former players such as Teddy Sheringham and Alan Shearer, as well as celebrities such as Hollywood actors Woody Harrelson, Mike Myers, Michael Sheen, chef Gordon Ramsay, actor Damian Lewis and singer Robbie Williams. The match took place at Old Trafford, Manchester and was won by the Rest of the World for the first time, the winning penalty scored by Harrelson after a 2–2 draw.

On 2 June 2013, Zidane took part in a charity match played at Old Trafford as part of the Manchester United Legends vs. Real Madrid Legends reverse fixture. The first leg took place in Santiago Bernabéu Stadium. Part of a team that included the likes of Figo, Fernando Redondo and Manolo Sanchís, the fixture raised funds for the Manchester United Foundation. The 12th Match against Poverty took place in Saint-Étienne, France, on Monday 20 April 2015, where Ronaldo and Zidane teamed up with other football stars against past and present players of French Ligue 1 club AS Saint-Étienne. According to UNDP, "two-thirds of all proceeds will go toward helping the hardest-hit countries of Guinea, Liberia and Sierra Leone build back better from the Ebola epidemic." In June 2018, Zidane reunited with his France 1998 World Cup winning teammates to play a charity game against an All-Star side which included Jamaican sprinter Usain Bolt. In a 3–2 win for France, Thierry Henry played a no-look one-two pass with Zidane before scoring, with Zidane then curling in a 25-yard free kick.

== Coaching career ==
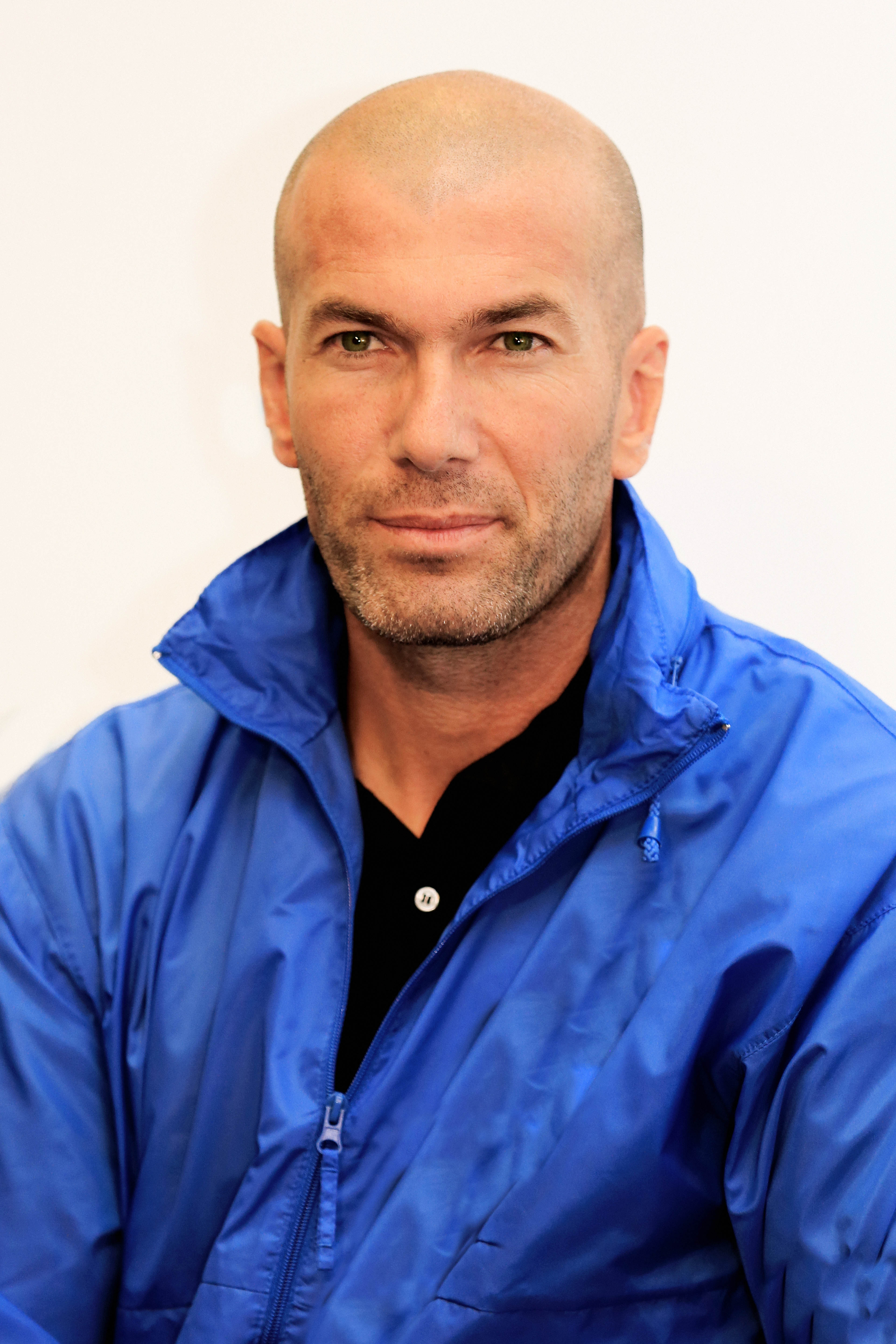
Zidane in 2013. He was the Real Madrid assistant coach for the 2013–14 season.

In November 2010, Zidane was appointed as a special adviser to Real Madrid's first team in response to an appeal made by then-Real Madrid coach José Mourinho for the former Real midfielder to work more closely with the team. In his new role, Zidane was expected to participate in Champions League events and functions and was also to travel with the first team on a regular basis and participate in pre-match gatherings, training sessions and meetings with the head coach. In July 2011, it was announced that he would become Real Madrid's new sporting director. In 2013, Zidane was appointed assistant coach to Carlo Ancelotti at Real Madrid.

=== Real Madrid Castilla ===
In June 2014, Real Madrid announced that Zidane would be the coach of Real Madrid's B team, Real Madrid Castilla. On 29 August, the director of the Spanish National Football Coach Education Centre (CENAFE), Miguel Galán, reported Zidane for acting as Real Madrid Castilla's head coach without the necessary coaching badges. According to Galán, "No one who has anything to do with the football world can be unaware that Zidane is acting as Real Madrid Castilla's head coach this season. It is a fait accompli that has been widely accepted, as shown by media reports, and Real Madrid do not deny it." While the official match report for Castilla's opening game in the Segunda División B lists Santiago Sánchez as the Los Blancos' head coach and Zidane as his assistant, Galán states, "This hierarchy only exists on paper. The truth is the exact opposite: Zidane is acting as Real Madrid Castilla's head coach, while, with all due respect to him as a colleague, Mr Sánchez's role basically boils down to providing the badges."

=== Real Madrid ===
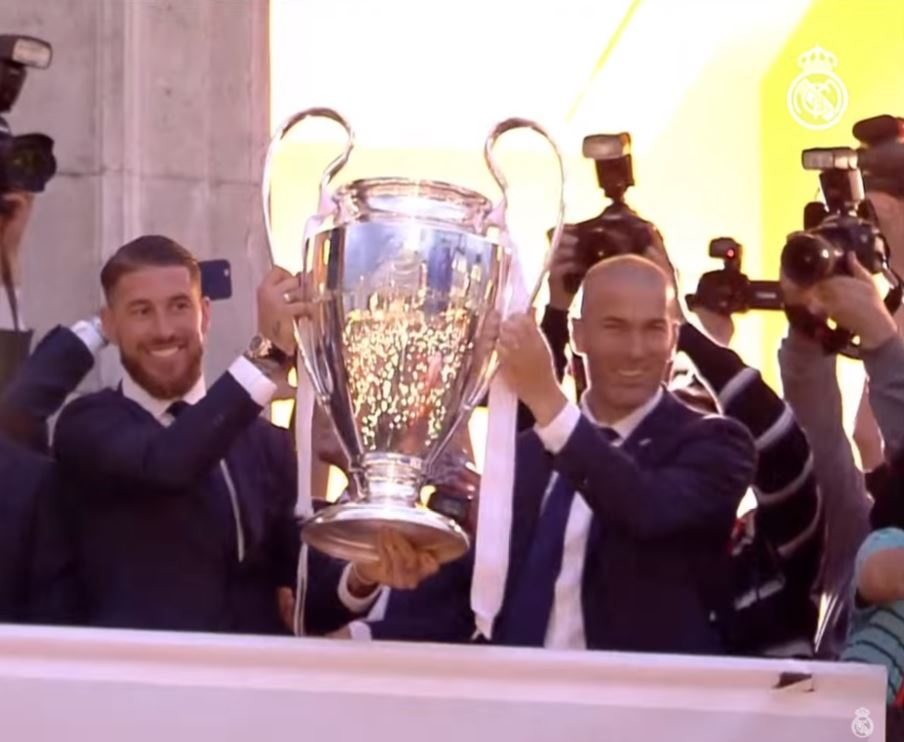
Zidane (right) with Real Madrid captain Sergio Ramos lifting the 2016 UEFA Champions League trophy

On 4 January 2016, Real Madrid announced the dismissal of Rafael Benítez and on the same day Zidane was appointed the new head coach of the club on a two-and-a-half-year deal. His first match as the club's new manager took place five days later, when Real Madrid beat Deportivo La Coruña 5–0 in a La Liga match. In his first El Clásico as a coach, held on 2 April at the Camp Nou, Zidane led his club to a 2–1 win over Barcelona, ending Barça's 39-match unbeaten run. On 4 May, Zidane led Real Madrid to a place in the Champions League final by beating Manchester City 1–0 on aggregate. In La Liga, Madrid ended up finishing second, with 90 points and just one point behind champions Barcelona. On 28 May, Real Madrid's eleventh Champions League title was won after a 5–3 penalty shoot-out victory over Atlético Madrid, with the achievement being termed "La Undécima". Zidane became the seventh man to win the European Cup both as a player and a coach and the second man (after Miguel Muñoz) to achieve the feat with Real Madrid. He also became the first French coach, except the French-Argentinian Helenio Herrera, to win the trophy.

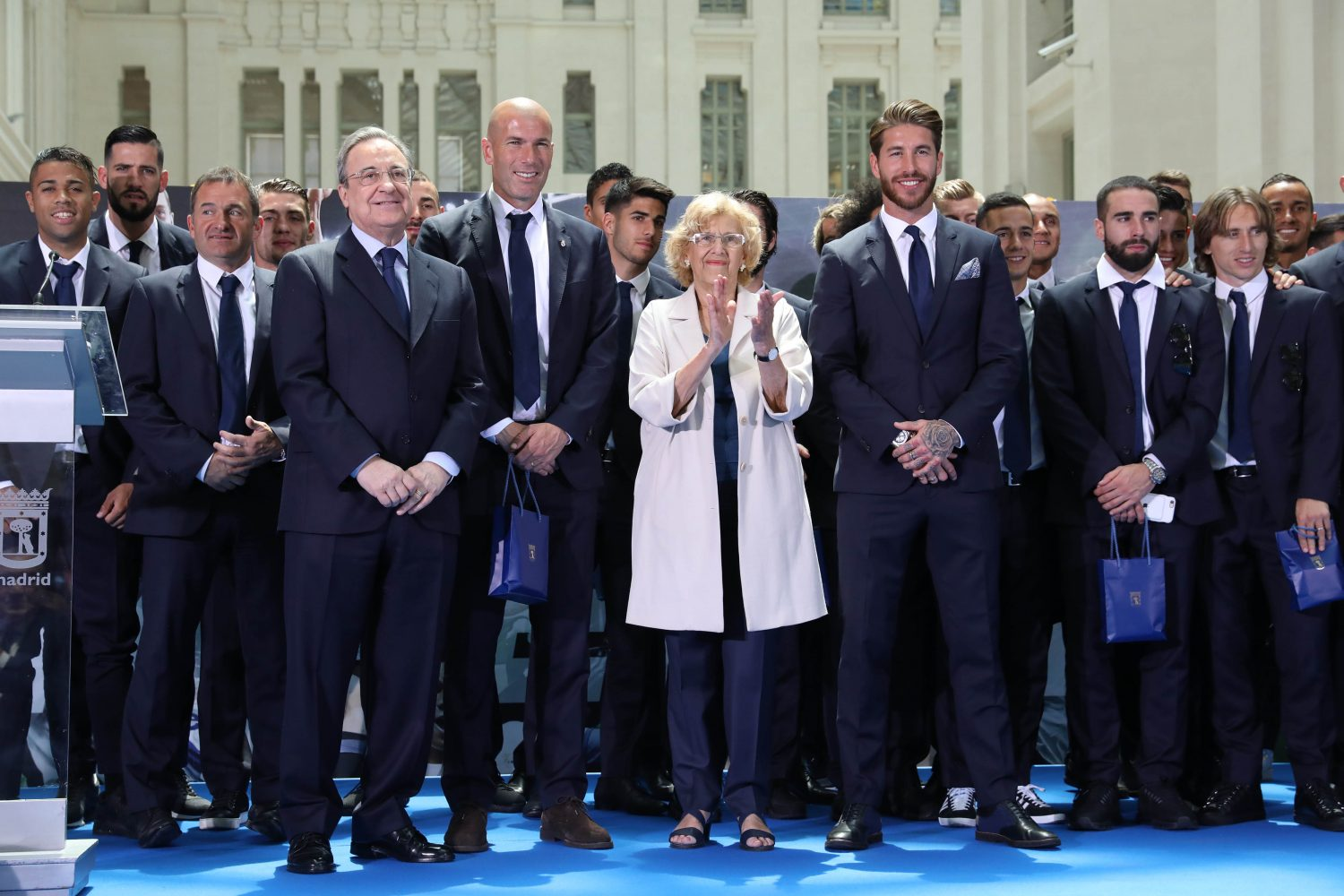
Zidane, with his Real Madrid players, standing to the right of Madrid mayor Manuela Carmena after Real had won their 33rd La Liga title, May 2017

Real Madrid began their 2016–17 campaign, which was to be Zidane's first full season in charge of the club, with a victory in the 2016 UEFA Super Cup against Sevilla. On 10 December 2016, Madrid played their 35th-straight match without a loss, which set a new club record. On 18 December 2016, the club defeated Japanese outfit Kashima Antlers 4–2 in the final of the 2016 FIFA Club World Cup. With a 3–3 draw at Sevilla in the second leg of the Copa del Rey round of 16 on 12 January 2017, Madrid progressed to the quarter-finals with a 6–3 aggregate victory and extended its unbeaten run to 40 matches, breaking Barcelona's Spanish record of 39 matches unbeaten in all competitions from the previous season. Their unbeaten streak ended after a 1–2 away loss against the same opposition in La Liga three days later. The team then was knocked out of the Copa del Rey by Celta Vigo 3–4 on aggregate. In May of that year, Madrid won the league title for a record 33rd time, their first title in five years, accumulating 93 points in the process. On 3 June 2017, the club's Champions League final win against Juventus resulted in Real Madrid being the first team to successfully defend their title in the UEFA Champions League era, and the first to win consecutive titles in the competition since Milan in 1989 and 1990, when the tournament was known as the European Cup. Real Madrid's title was its 12th, extending the record, and its third in four years. The achievement is also known as "La Duodécima". With Real's Champions League victory, Zidane became only the second manager to win the European Cup in his first two seasons in management, alongside fellow Real Madrid coach José Villalonga.

Real kicked off the 2017–18 campaign by winning its second consecutive and fourth overall UEFA Super Cup in a 2–1 victory against Manchester United. Five days later, Real Madrid beat Barcelona at the Camp Nou 3–1 in the first leg of the 2017 Supercopa de España and then defeated Barça 2–0 in the return leg, ending their 24 consecutive match scoring record in El Clásico matches and winning the second trophy of the season. This title tied Zidane with Vicente del Bosque as the third most successful Real Madrid coach with seven titles, one short of Luis Molowny. This also meant that, at the time, Zidane had won as many titles in his coaching position in Real Madrid as games lost during his tenure. Zidane's success saw him named Best FIFA Men's Coach in 2017. On 16 December 2017, Zidane won his eighth trophy as coach as Real beat Brazilian club Grêmio 1–0 in the FIFA Club World Cup final and became the first team to retain the trophy. On 24 January 2018, Madrid was knocked out of the Copa del Rey at the quarter-final stage by Leganés on away goals. The team's league campaign was also a disappointment as Real collected only 76 points and finished third, 17 points behind champions Barcelona. Madrid fared far better in the Champions League, once again progressing to the final where they defeated Liverpool 3–1 to become the first club to win three straight titles in the Champions League era, as well as the first team to win three consecutive titles in the European Cup/Champions League since Bayern Munich in 1976. At that time, he became one of three managers, alongside Bob Paisley and Carlo Ancelotti, to win the European Cup three times, while also becoming the first coach to win the trophy in three consecutive seasons. On 31 May, five days after the Champions League final, Zidane announced his resignation as Real Madrid coach, citing the club's "need for change" as his rationale for departing.

=== Return to Real Madrid ===
Following some poor results for Real Madrid in the months following Zidane's departure – culminating in elimination from the Copa del Rey at home to Barcelona, a league loss to the same opponent at the same venue which opened up a 12-point gap between the clubs, and an unexpected home 4–1 defeat to Ajax in the Champions League which brought the long run of success in that competition to an end, all within the space of a week – his former teammate Santiago Solari (who himself had only been in the post for five months, after Julen Lopetegui's equally brief spell in charge) was dismissed and Zidane returned as the Real Madrid head coach on 11 March 2019, on a contract until summer 2022.

The 2019–20 season seemed a promising one, as Madrid went on a spending spree in the summer of 2019, signing Eden Hazard, Luka Jović, Éder Militão, Ferland Mendy, Rodrygo, Reinier and other players for a total of more than €350 million. On 12 January 2020, Zidane guided Madrid to their first trophy in his second spell, with the club defeating cross-city rivals Atlético Madrid in a penalty shootout in the Supercopa de España final. After a three-month hiatus due to the COVID-19 outbreak in March 2020, La Liga was restarted in June and Madrid won ten games in a row to capture the team's 34th league title, collecting 87 points in total. It was Zidane's second league title in his coaching career. His collective mindset was hailed by international and Spanish media, as Real Madrid broke several records, including the number of scorers and maintaining their best league defensive record in 30 years, with 21 of his players managing to get on the scoresheet during the campaign. Zidane left a second time on 27 May 2021 after going trophyless that season.

=== France ===
After the conclusion of the 2022 FIFA World Cup, Zidane was approached to become the head coach of the United States national soccer team but declined. On 18 July 2026, L'Équipe reported that Zidane was set to succeed Didier Deschamps as the head coach of the France national team. Zidane was named as coach on 28 July 2026 in a press conference, with contracts for him and his staff scheduled to take effect on 1 September. At his unveiling, Zidane said he had turned down every offer since leaving Real Madrid because coaching France was the only job he wanted, having targeted the role after Deschamps announced his planned departure in 2025.

Zidane's first game coaching France was a 0–1 away win against Turkey, with a Kylian Mbappé goal from a Michael Olise assist, in the league phase of the 2026–27 UEFA Nations League. His first home win was against Belgium, 4–1, at Stade de France on 5 October 2026.

== Reception and legacy ==
=== As a player ===
"Zidane is the master. Over the past ten years, there's been no one like him, he has been the best player in the world."

— Pelé

"Technically, I think he is the king of what's fundamental in the game – control and passing. I don't think anyone can match him when it comes to controlling or receiving the ball."

— Michel Platini

Many football legends have acclaimed Zidane's skills and importance in the history of the sport, such as Brazil coach Carlos Alberto Parreira, who called Zidane "a monster" for his performance and abilities. German coach Franz Beckenbauer stated, "Zidane is one of the greatest players in history, a truly magnificent player." Italy manager Marcello Lippi, who also coached Zidane, opined, "I think Zidane is the greatest talent we've known in football these last twenty years." Former England manager Kevin Keegan said, "You look at Zidane and think 'I've never seen a player quite like that.' What sets Zidane apart is the way he manipulates a football, buying himself space that isn't there. Add his vision and it makes him very special." At the 1998 World Cup, Italian manager Cesare Maldini said, "I would give up five players to have Zidane in my squad."

In terms of ball retention he was probably the greatest player of all time, blessed with such grace and supernatural awareness that he could play a game of real-life Pac-Man and never be caught.

— Rob Smyth of The Guardian on Zidane's ball control.

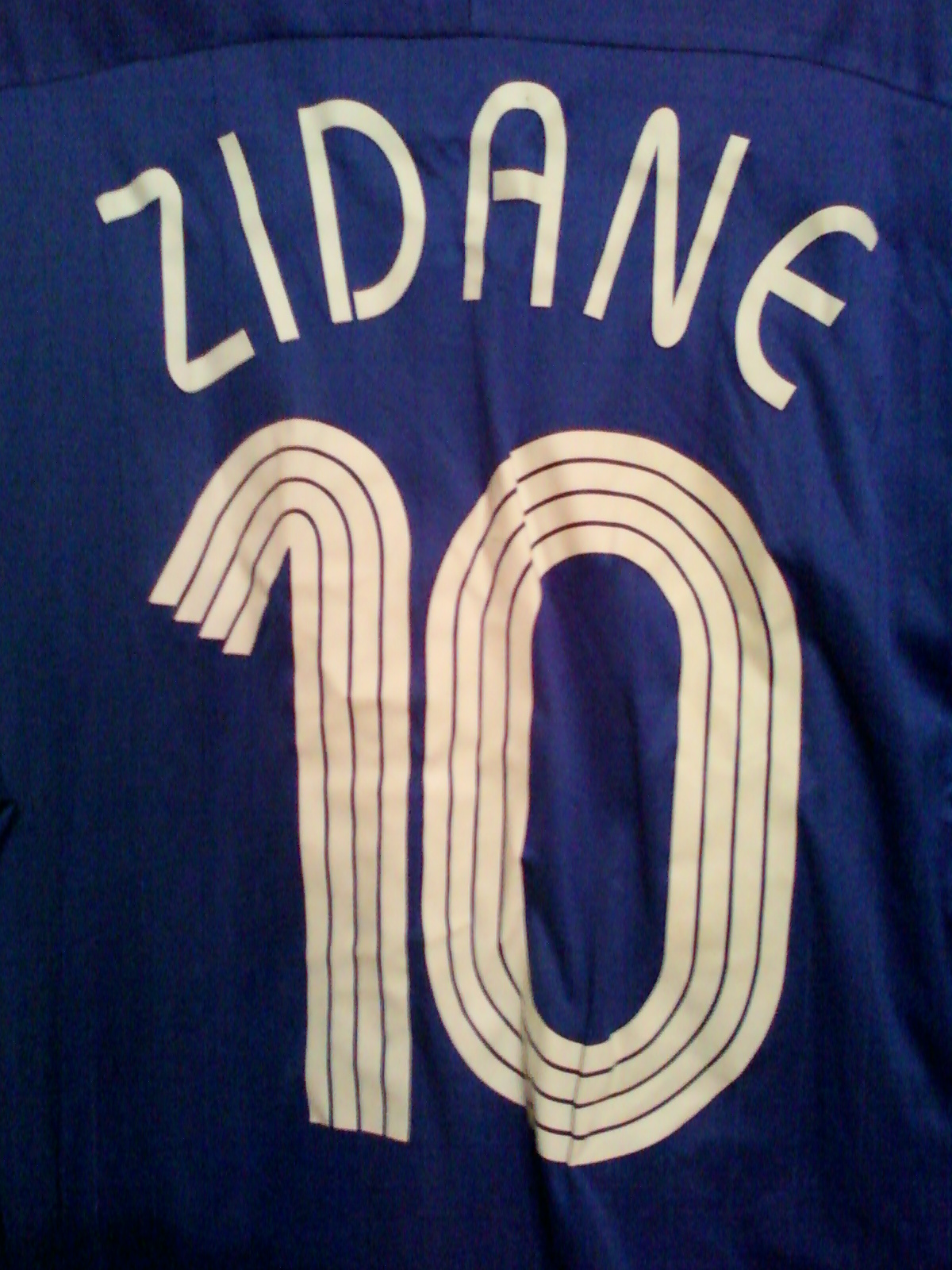
Zidane's France home jersey from the 2006 World Cup. An elite playmaker, he wore number 10 for much of his international career.

Among his playing peers, Swedish striker Zlatan Ibrahimović commented, "Zidane was from another planet. When Zidane stepped onto the pitch, the ten other guys just got suddenly better. It is that simple." David Beckham has described Zidane as "the greatest of all time", Barcelona star Xavi has stated in a 2010 interview that Zidane was the "best player in the '90s and early 2000s", while Brazilian defender and former Real Madrid teammate Roberto Carlos has said of Zidane, "He is the best player I've seen. Supporters arrived earlier at the Bernabéu just to see him warm-up." Brazilian playmaker Ronaldinho stated, "Zidane is one of the best footballers of all time, one of my idols. He had such elegance and grace, a wonderful touch and superb vision." Belgian playmaker Eden Hazard regards Zidane as "the best ever", and growing up he learned from his idol by "watching him on television and online for hours".

Displaying skills with an array of moves such as his signature La Roulette pirouette, step overs, and close ball control, former Brazilian international Rivaldo stated, "His elegance of movement on the pitch and his skills are uncanny." Journalist Sid Lowe wrote, "Zidane was football's answer to the Bolshoi Ballet. Zidane was elegance above all else." In 2005, upon Zidane's return to the French national team, his teammate Thierry Henry stated, "In France, everybody realized that God exists, and that he is back in the French international team." Zidane has been lauded by sportsmen outside football; having witnessed Zidane's goal against Deportivo La Coruña in January 2002, where he dragged the ball right then left, turning the defender inside out, before scoring with a left foot finish, basketball player Magic Johnson stated, "One of the most inspiring nights of my life. Zidane is a phenomenon."

Labelled a "flawed genius" by ESPN, Zidane possessed an exceptional first touch, and was also known for his dribbling skills and elegance on the ball. He was capable of using either foot, despite being naturally right-footed. His technique and co-ordination enabled him to execute shots and volleys with extreme power and precision, in particular from outside the penalty area; he was also a free kick and penalty kick specialist. A renowned playmaker, Zidane's natural position was a classic number 10 behind the strikers. He was also capable of playing as a second striker, as a winger, or as a central midfielder or deep-lying playmaker, due to his ability to orchestrate his team's attacking plays from deep with his vision and passing. Thus, he was capable of both assisting and scoring goals, despite being neither the most prolific goalscorer. While not known for his heading ability, his height and physical strength also allowed him to be effective in the air, and saw him score several crucial headers throughout his career. He also drew praise from his managers for his defensive work-rate. Despite not being the quickest player, he possessed good agility and acceleration. He also had excellent positioning and outstanding spatial awareness. Although he had a reserved and humble character, his former Juventus managers Lippi and Ancelotti also praised Zidane for being a team player, on whom his teammates could rely. Notwithstanding the acclaim that Zidane received from the media over his playing ability, he also drew criticism in the media over his temperament and discipline, and for his occasional violent conduct on the pitch, which led to Zidane picking up cards; he was also accused by the media for drifting in and out of games and for lacking leadership qualities, although he was able to establish himself as a consistent and decisive player, who was also an influential captain at the international level throughout his career.

Zidane has been named FIFA World Player of the Year three times, a feat achieved only by Ronaldo, Lionel Messi and Cristiano Ronaldo. In 2002, ESPN described Zidane as "the greatest player in the world in the world's biggest game". In a 2002 FIFA poll, Zidane was selected in the FIFA World Cup Dream Team. In 2004, he was voted UEFA Best European Player of the Past 50 Years, and was named in the FIFA 100 list of the world's greatest living players. In a 2004 poll conducted by French newspaper Journal du Dimanche, Zidane was voted as "the most popular Frenchman of all time". In 2014, in a poll carried out by French TV channel TF1, Zidane was voted as the best player in the history of the French league. In 2016, in a study led by French newspaper Le Parisien, Zidane was named "best French player of all time".

=== As a coach ===
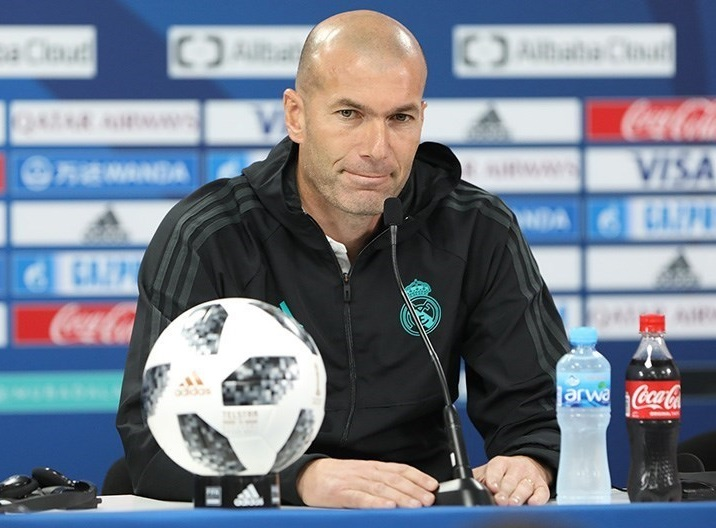
Zidane at a press conference during the 2017 FIFA Club World Cup. As head coach of Real Madrid he won the UEFA Champions League an unprecedented three times in a row.

Despite establishing himself as one of the most successful coaches of his era and in the history of Real Madrid, Zidane's time at Real Madrid was considered by some to be shadowed by a partial amount of luck. His tactical philosophy has been praised by many. Zidane's tactical style, characterised by its formation flexibility and attacking football, as well as his ability to unite the dressing room, have been positively compared to Carlo Ancelotti's coaching method. His use of in-game substitutions was particularly praised, as many of his substitutes led to victories, such as introducing Marco Asensio and Lucas Vázquez in order to provide pace and width against Paris Saint-Germain in the UEFA Champions League to overturn a 1–0 deficit into a 3–1 victory. Similarly, his use of Gareth Bale as a substitute in the 2018 UEFA Champions League Final proved crucial; Bale scored two goals after being brought on, turning a 1–1 tie into a 3–1 Madrid victory. It is also noted that his team focused on attacking through the flanks, while he is credited for repopularising the 4–4–2 diamond formation in contemporary football.

On the other hand, some consider that Zidane's role was more focused in grinding out results and uniting the dressing room, rather than having a fixed tactical scheme. Zidane emphasised the importance of players' physical levels and preferred to choose impactful players over a defined system. During his time at Real Madrid, he used several formations, including the 4–3–3, the 4–2–3–1, the 4–4–2, and the 3–5–2, in order to find the system that best suited his players, and has been credited with using "simple systems", "so that his players have the freedom needed to prove their superiority". Zidane has been praised for his balanced approach as a coach, and for having the leadership skills and personability to manage and motivate several world class players, create a good team environment, foster professional relationships, and a strong winning mentality; he has also demonstrated an ability to rotate players and get the best out his team, which has played a key role in his success. In 2019, he commented, "You ask me about two players but what interests me is the group. Karim is important for the team, not just for his goals. Casemiro gives a lot of balance, but not only that. Everyone contributes something to the team in their own way on the field". Regarding his coaching role at Real Madrid, Zidane commented in 2018: "When you work with high-quality players, they know how to manage those periods of games when you’re not playing well, and they get things back on track very quickly. My job was to keep people calm!" Two of his main influences as a manager are his own former managers Marcello Lippi and Carlo Ancelotti.

== In popular culture ==
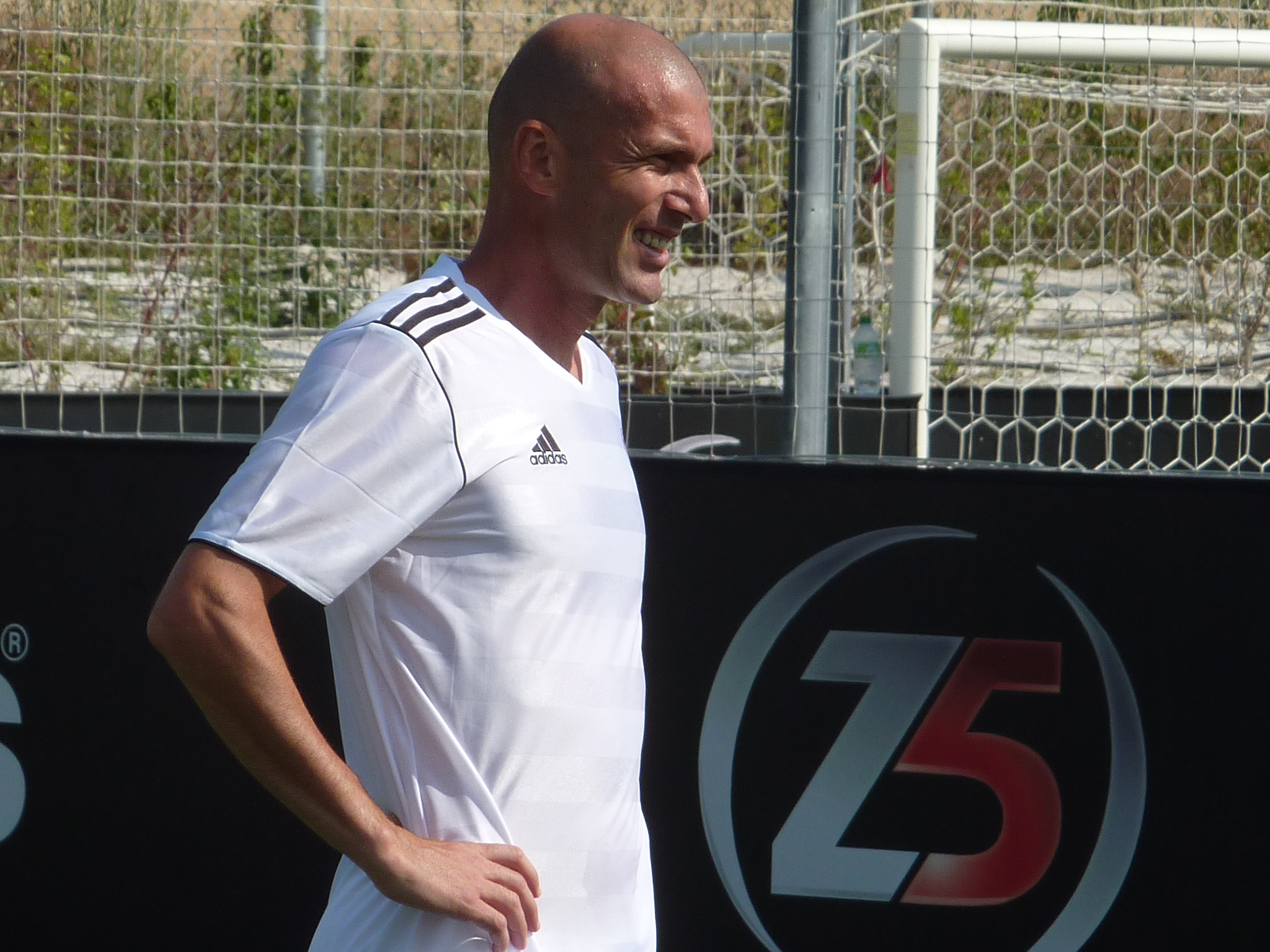
Zidane's Z5 Group is a sporting complex made up of five a side football pitches sponsored by Adidas.

Zidane has had endorsements with many companies, including Adidas, Lego, France Telecom, Orange, Audi, Volvic and Christian Dior. These sponsorship deals earned him €8.6 million on top of his €6.4 million Real Madrid salary in 2006, totalling €15 million ($20.4 million), which made him the sixth-highest paid footballer. In 2004, Forbes magazine listed his earnings of $15.8 million for the previous 12 months. In May 2010, Zidane appeared in a commercial for Louis Vuitton, indulging in a game of table football with Pelé and Diego Maradona. Zidane features as the cover star of the Ultimate Edition of the FIFA video game FIFA 20.

In 2005, filmmakers Philippe Parreno and Douglas Gordon filmed a documentary Zidane: A 21st Century Portrait, which follows Zidane during an entire match, filmed with 17 cameras. Scottish post-rock band Mogwai provided the soundtrack. The documentary was part of the 2009 Full Frame Documentary Film Festival.

In November 2006, Zidane toured Bangladesh as the guest of Nobel Peace Prize winner Muhammad Yunus. He also visited the Algerian birthplace of his parents and met with Algerian president Abdelaziz Bouteflika, who gave him an official reception. In 2012, French-Algerian artist Adel Abdessemed unveiled a bronze sculpture depicting Zidane's headbutt of Marco Materazzi in the 2006 World Cup Final.

On 5 November 2006, Zidane appeared in the American animated sitcom Family Guy, seen headbutting an old lady in the episode "Saving Private Brian" as a parody of his headbutt on Materazzi. The infamous headbutt has also been the subject of a lyrical essay by the Belgian novelist Jean-Philippe Toussaint entitled La Mélancolie de Zidane (2006).

In 2008, he made a cameo appearance in Asterix at the Olympic Games as Numérodis (a pun on "Number 10", his squad number for the French national team), an Egyptian who tests out a new round object.

In 2010, footage of Zidane appeared in the "Waka Waka" music video by Shakira, which shows him celebrating France winning the 1998 World Cup. In 2014, Australian sports presenter Les Murray collaborated with the band Vaudeville Smash and performed a Zidane tribute song portraying Zidane as the greatest among dozens of legendary players. The accompanying music video featured four footballers performing ball tricks in Zidane masks, one of whom ends up headbutting a nightwatchman. In 2016, Zidane was ranked one of the 500 most influential Muslims in the world by the Royal Islamic Strategic Studies Centre of Jordan, which noted: "[Zidane's] modest character has endeared him to the wider public."

== Personal life ==
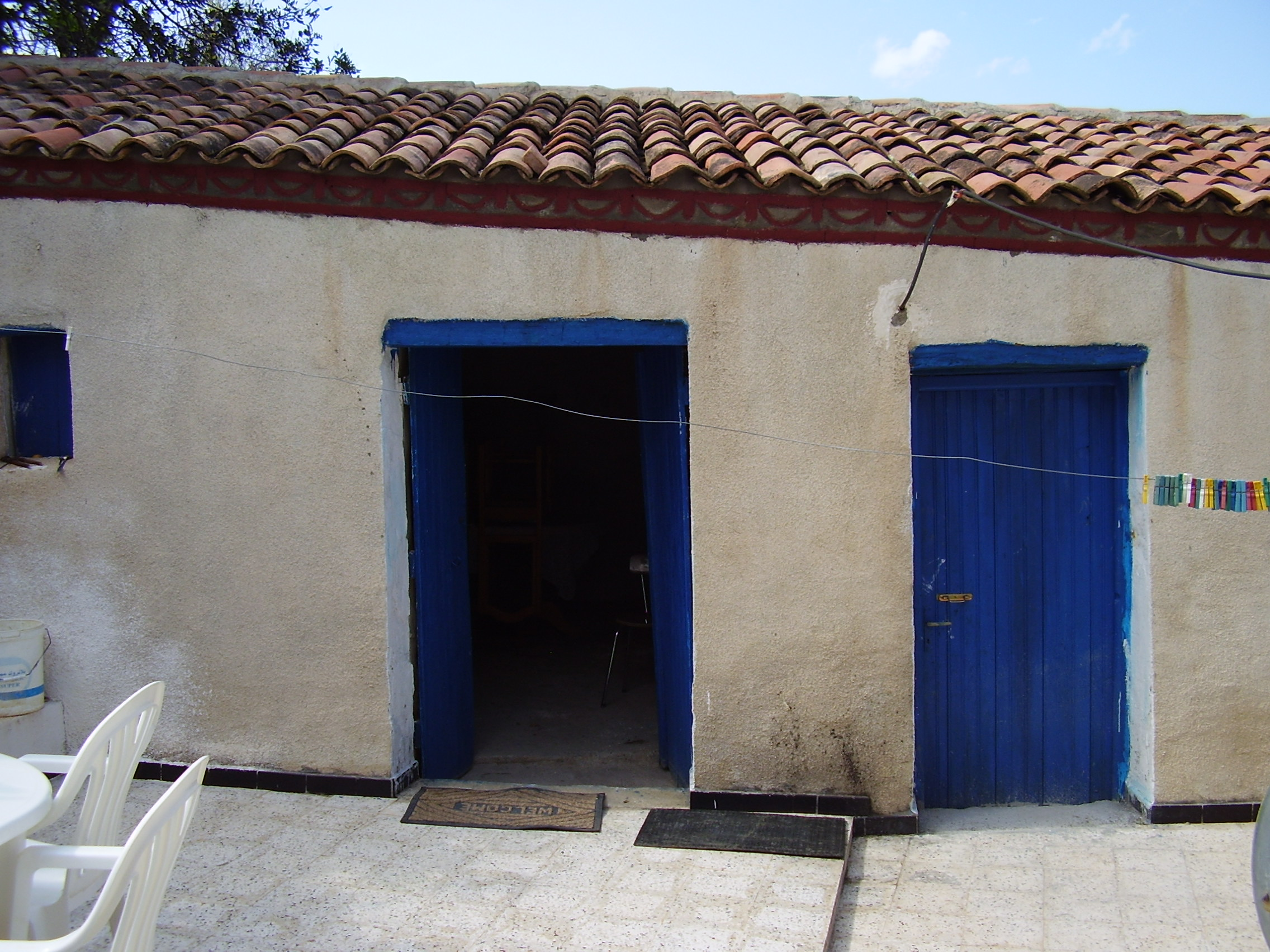
Zidane's parents' house in the village of Aguemoune in Algeria, which he visited on 15 December 2006

At the age of 17, Zidane met his future wife, Véronique Fernández (born in Aveyron of Spanish descent), while playing for Cannes in the 1988–89 season. Married in 1994, they have four sons: Enzo Zidane (born 24 March 1995), Luca Zidane (born 13 May 1998), Théo Zidane (born 18 May 2002), and Elyaz Zidane (born 26 December 2005). All four of his sons played as professional footballers and all came through the youth academy of Real Madrid.

Zidane has described himself as a "non-practicing Muslim", and is open about his religion and spirituality.

On 12 July 2019, his elder brother Farid died of cancer at the age of 54.

== Career statistics ==
=== Club ===
Appearances and goals by club, season and competition
Club	Season	League			Cup (Note: Includes Coupe de la Ligue.)		Europe		Other		Total	
Club	Season	Division	Apps	Goals	Apps	Goals	Apps	Goals	Apps	Goals	Apps	Goals
Cannes	1988–89	Division 1	2	0	0	0	—		—		2	0
Cannes	1989–90	Division 1	0	0	0	0	—		—		0	0
Cannes	1990–91	Division 1	28	1	3	0	—		—		31	1
Cannes	1991–92	Division 1	31	5	3	0	4	0	—		38	5
Cannes	Totals		61	6	6	0	4	0	0	0	71	6
Bordeaux	1992–93	Division 1	35	10	4	1	—		—		39	11
Bordeaux	1993–94	Division 1	34	6	3	0	6	2	—		43	8
Bordeaux	1994–95	Division 1	37	6	5	1	4	1	—		46	8
Bordeaux	1995–96	Division 1	33	6	3	0	15	6	—		51	12
Bordeaux	Totals		139	28	15	2	25	9	0	0	179	39
Juventus	1996–97	Serie A	29	5	2	0	10	2	3 (Note: Two appearances in UEFA Super Cup, one appearance in Intercontinental Cup.)	0	44	7
Juventus	1997–98	Serie A	32	7	5	1	11	3	1 (Note: Appearance in Supercoppa Italiana.)	0	49	11
Juventus	1998–99	Serie A	25	2	5	0	10	0	1	0	41	2
Juventus	1999–2000	Serie A	32	4	3	1	6	0	—		41	5
Juventus	2000–01	Serie A	33	6	2	0	4	0	—		39	6
Juventus	Totals		151	24	17	2	41	5	5	0	214	31
Real Madrid	2001–02	La Liga	31	7	9	2	9	3	2 (Note: Appearance(s) in Supercopa de España.)	0	51	12
Real Madrid	2002–03	La Liga	33	9	1	0	14	3	2 (Note: One appearance in UEFA Super Cup, one appearance in Intercontinental Cup.)	0	50	12
Real Madrid	2003–04	La Liga	33	6	7	1	10	3	2	0	52	10
Real Madrid	2004–05	La Liga	29	6	1	0	10	0	—		40	6
Real Madrid	2005–06	La Liga	29	9	5	0	4	0	—		38	9
Real Madrid	Total		155	37	23	3	47	9	6	0	230	49
Career total			506	95	61	7	117	23	11	0	695	125

=== International ===
Appearances and goals by year and competition
Team	Year	Competitive		Friendly		Total	
Team	Year	Apps	Goals	Apps	Goals	Apps	Goals
France	1994	1 (Note: Appearance in the UEFA Euro 1996 qualifying)	0	1	2	2	2
France	1995	5 (Note: Appearances in the UEFA Euro 1996 qualifying)	2	1	0	6	2
France	1996	5 (Note: Appearances at UEFA Euro 1996)	0	7	1	12	1
France	1997	—		8	1	8	1
France	1998	8 (Note: Five appearances and two goals in the 1998 FIFA World Cup, three appearances in the UEFA Euro 2000 qualifying)	2	7	3	15	5
France	1999	3 (Note: Appearances in the UEFA Euro 2000 qualifying)	1	3	0	6	1
France	2000	5 (Note: Appearances at UEFA Euro 2000)	2	8	2	13	4
France	2001	—		8	2	8	2
France	2002	4 (Note: One appearance in the 2002 FIFA World Cup, three appearances in the UEFA Euro 2004 qualifying)	0	5	1	9	1
France	2003	4 (Note: Appearances in the UEFA Euro 2004 qualifying)	3	3	0	7	3
France	2004	4 (Note: Appearances at UEFA Euro 2004)	3	3	1	7	4
France	2005	4 (Note: Appearances in the 2006 FIFA World Cup qualification)	1	1	1	5	2
France	2006	6 (Note: Appearances in the 2006 FIFA World Cup)	3	4	0	10	3
Total		49	17	59	14	108	31

Scores and results list France's goal tally first.

Key
‡	Indicates goal was scored from a penalty kick
	Indicates won the match
	Indicates the match ended in draw
	Refers to unofficial matches

International goals scored by Zinedine Zidane
No.	Cap	Date	Venue	Opponent	Score	Result	Competition
1	1	17 August 1994	Stade Chaban-Delmas, Bordeaux, France	Czech Republic	1–2	2–2	Friendly
2	1	17 August 1994	Stade Chaban-Delmas, Bordeaux, France	Czech Republic	2–2	2–2	Friendly
3	6	6 September 1995	Stade de l'Abbé-Deschamps, Auxerre, France	Azerbaijan	7–0	10–0	UEFA Euro 1996 qualifying
4	7	11 October 1995	Stadionul Steaua, Bucharest, Romania	Romania	3–1	3–1	UEFA Euro 1996 qualifying
5	10	21 February 1996	Stade des Costières, Nîmes, France	Greece	3–1	3–1	Friendly
6	26	11 June 1997	Parc des Princes, Paris, France	Italy	1–0	2–2	1997 Tournoi de France
7	29	28 January 1998	Stade de France, Saint-Denis, France	Spain	1–0	1–0	Friendly
8	30	25 February 1998	Stade Vélodrome, Marseille, France	Norway	2–1	3–3	Friendly
9	32	27 May 1998	Stade Mohammed V, Casablanca, Morocco	Belgium	1–0	1–0	1998 King Hassan II Cup
10	39	12 July 1998	Stade de France, Saint-Denis, France	Brazil	1–0	3–0	1998 FIFA World Cup final
11	39	12 July 1998	Stade de France, Saint-Denis, France	Brazil	2–0	3–0	1998 FIFA World Cup final
12	47	8 September 1999	Hrazdan Stadium, Yerevan, Armenia	Armenia	2–1	3–2	UEFA Euro 2000 qualifying
13	50	23 February 2000	Stade de France, Saint-Denis, France	Poland	1–0	1–0	Friendly
14	53	4 June 2000	Stade Mohamed V, Casablanca, Morocco	Japan	1–0	2–2	2000 King Hassan II Cup
15	57	25 June 2000	Jan Breydel Stadium, Bruges, Belgium	Spain	1–0	2–1	UEFA Euro 2000
16	58	28 June 2000	King Baudouin Stadium, Brussels, Belgium	Portugal	2–1‡	2–1	UEFA Euro 2000
17	63	27 February 2001	Stade de France, Saint-Denis, France	Germany	1–0	1–0	Friendly
18	64	24 March 2001	Stade de France, Saint-Denis, France	Japan	1–0‡	5–0	Friendly
19	72	27 March 2002	Stade de France, Saint-Denis, France	Scotland	1–0	5–0	Friendly
20	81	29 March 2003	Stade Bollaert-Delelis, Lens, Pas-de-Calais, France	Malta	4–0	6–0	UEFA Euro 2004 qualifying
21	81	29 March 2003	Stade Bollaert-Delelis, Lens, Pas-de-Calais, France	Malta	6–0‡	6–0	UEFA Euro 2004 qualifying
22	82	2 April 2003	Stadio Renzo Barbera, Palermo, Italy	Israel	2–0	2–1	UEFA Euro 2004 qualifying
23	89	6 June 2004	Stade de France, Saint-Denis, France	Ukraine	1–0	1–0	Friendly
24	90	13 June 2004	Estádio da Luz, Lisbon, Portugal	England	1–1	2–1	UEFA Euro 2004
25	90	13 June 2004	Estádio da Luz, Lisbon, Portugal	England	2–1‡	2–1	UEFA Euro 2004
26	92	21 June 2004	Estádio Cidade de Coimbra, Coimbra, Portugal	Switzerland	1–0	3–1	UEFA Euro 2004
27	94	17 August 2005	Stade de la Mosson, Montpellier, France	Ivory Coast	2–0	3–0	Friendly
28	98	12 October 2005	Stade de France, Saint-Denis, France	Cyprus	1–0	4–0	2006 FIFA World Cup qualification
29	105	27 June 2006	Niedersachsenstadion, Hannover, Germany	Spain	3–1	3–1	2006 FIFA World Cup
30	107	5 July 2006	Allianz Arena, Munich, Germany	Portugal	1–0‡	1–0	2006 FIFA World Cup
31	108	9 July 2006	Olympiastadion, Berlin, Germany	Italy	1–0‡	1–1 (3–5 p)	2006 FIFA World Cup final

== Managerial statistics ==
As of match played 15 November 2026

Managerial record by team and tenure
Team	Nat.	From	To	Record								Ref.
Team	Nat.	From	To	G	W	D	L	GF	GA	GD	Win %	Ref.
Real Madrid Castilla	(Spain)	25 June 2014	4 January 2016	57	26	17	14	88	58	+30	45.61	
Real Madrid	(Spain)	4 January 2016	31 May 2018	149	105	28	16	398	163	+235	70.47	
Real Madrid	(Spain)	11 March 2019	30 June 2021	114	69	25	20	207	104	+103	60.53	
France	(France)	1 August 2026	Present	6	4	1	1	10	6	+4	66.67	
Career Total				326	204	71	51	703	331	+372	62.58	

== Honours ==
=== Player ===
Bordeaux

- UEFA Intertoto Cup: 1995
- UEFA Cup runner-up: 1995–96

Juventus

- Serie A: 1996–97, 1997–98
- Supercoppa Italiana: 1997
- UEFA Super Cup: 1996
- Intercontinental Cup: 1996
- UEFA Intertoto Cup: 1999
- UEFA Champions League runner-up: 1996–97, 1997–98

Real Madrid

- La Liga: 2002–03
- Supercopa de España: 2001, 2003
- UEFA Champions League: 2001–02
- UEFA Super Cup: 2002
- Intercontinental Cup: 2002

France U16

- Syrenka Cup: 1987

France

- FIFA World Cup: 1998; runner-up: 2006
- UEFA European Championship: 2000

Individual

- French Division 1 Young Player of the Year: 1993–94
- French Division 1 Player of the Year: 1995–96
- Serie A Foreign Footballer of the Year: 1996–97, 2000–01
- Onze d'Argent: 1997, 2002, 2003
- FIFA XI: 1997, 1998, 2000, 2002
- ESM Team of the Year: 1997–98, 2001–02, 2002–03, 2003–04
- UEFA Club Midfielder of the Year: 1998
- L'Équipe International Champion of Champions: 1998
- L'Équipe France Champion of Champions: 1998
- FIFA World Cup All-Star team: 1998, 2006
- World Soccer Awards Player of the Year: 1998
- France Football French Player of the Year: 1998, 2002
- Onze d'Or: 1998, 2000, 2001
- Ballon d'Or: 1998
- FIFA World Player of the Year: 1998, 2000, 2003
- El País European Player of the Year: 1998, 2001, 2002, 2003
- RSSSF Player of the Year: 1998
- Onze de Bronze: 1999
- World Soccer's Selection of the 100 Greatest Footballers of the 20th Century: 1999
- 2nd French Player of the Century (France Football): 2000
- UEFA European Championship Player of the Tournament: 2000
- UEFA European Championship Team of the Tournament: 2000, 2004
- Serie A top assist provider: 2000–01
- Serie A Footballer of the Year: 2000–01
- UEFA Team of the Year: 2001, 2002, 2003
- Don Balón Award: 2001–02
- La Liga Best Foreign Player: 2001–02
- UEFA Club Footballer of the Year: 2002
- FIFA World Cup Dream Team: 2002
- FIFA 100: 2004
- UEFA Best European Player of the Past 50 Years: 2004
- FIFA FIFPro World XI: 2005, 2006
- IFFHS World's Best Playmaker: 2006
- FIFA World Cup Golden Ball: 2006
- UNFP Honorary Award: 2007
- AFS Top-100 Players of All Time #5: 2007
- Marca Leyenda Award: 2008
- Golden Foot Legends Award: 2008
- ESPN Team of the Decade: 2009
- ESPN Player of the Decade: 2009
- Fox Sports Player of the Decade: 2009
- Sports Illustrated Team of the Decade: 2009
- Sports Illustrated Player of the Decade: 2009
- Don Balón Team of the Decade: 2010
- Don Balón Player of the Decade: 2010
- Laureus Lifetime Achievement Award: 2011
- UEFA Team of Teams: 2011
- UEFA Champions League Best Player of the Past 20 Years: 2011
- Équipe type spéciale 20 ans des trophées UNFP: 2011
- Real Madrid Greatest XI of All Time: 2012
- World Soccer Greatest XI of All Time: 2013
- Real Madrid Hall of Fame: 2014
- UEFA Ultimate Team of the Year (substitute): 2015
- IFFHS Legends: 2016
- UEFA European Championship All-Time XI: 2016
- FourFourTwo's Selection of the 100 Greatest Footballers of All Time #8: 2017
- Juventus Greatest XI of All Time: 2017
- L'Équipe Best French Player of All Time: 2018
- Ballon d'Or Dream Team (Silver): 2020
- IFFHS All-time Men's B Dream Team: 2021
- IFFHS All-time Europe Men's Dream Team: 2021
- FourFourTwo's 100 Best Football Players of All Time #7: 2022
- Italian Football Hall of Fame: 2022
- Juventus Hall of Fame: 2025

=== Manager ===
Real Madrid

- La Liga: 2016–17, 2019–20
- Supercopa de España: 2017, 2020
- UEFA Champions League: 2015–16, 2016–17, 2017–18
- UEFA Super Cup: 2016, 2017
- FIFA Club World Cup: 2016, 2017

Individual

- La Liga Manager of the Month: April 2016, May 2017
- UEFA La Liga Team Revelation of the Year: 2015–16
- UEFA Champions League Breakthrough XI: 2015–16
- IFFHS World's Best Club Coach – Runner-up: 2016
- The Best FIFA Football Coach: 2017; Runner-up: 2016, 2018
- France Football French Manager of the Year: 2016, 2017
- Le Buteur Coach of the Year: 2016
- UEFA La Liga Team of the Season: 2016–17, 2019–20
- France Football UEFA Champions League Team of the Season: 2016–17
- Onze d'Or Coach of the Year: 2016–17, 2017–18, 2020–21
- ESPN Manager of the Year: 2017
- IFFHS World's Best Club Coach: 2017, 2018
- IFFHS Men's World Team: 2017
- RMC French Manager of the Year: 2017
- Globe Soccer Awards Best Coach of the Year: 2017
- World Soccer magazine World Manager of the Year: 2017; Runner-up: 2018
- France Football 22nd Greatest Manager of All Time: 2019
- Sports Illustrated 34th Greatest Manager of All Time: 2019
- Miguel Muñoz Trophy: 2019–20
- L'Équipe's Best Club Coach: 2020
- FourFourTwo's 36th Greatest Manager of All Time: 2020
- Globe Soccer Awards Coach of the Century 2001–2020 (Runners-up)
- IFFHS's 38th All Time World's Best Coach: 2021

=== Orders ===
- Knight of the Legion of Honour: 1998
- National Order of Merit: 2006
- Officer of the Legion of Honour: 2008

=== Records ===
==== As a player ====
- The most expensive footballer in history: 2001–2009
- Most FIFA World Cup Final matches scored in: 2 matches (shared with Pelé, Vavá, Paul Breitner and Kylian Mbappé)
- Most red cards received in FIFA World Cup matches: 2 (shared with Rigobert Song)
- One of the two players in history to be named player of the year in 3 of the Top 5 Leagues: Division 1 Player of the Year (1996), Serie A Footballer of the Year (2001), Don Balón Award (2002)
- Most FIFA World Player of the Year awards: 6 in total

==== As a manager ====
- Best winning streak in the history of La Liga: 16 games (shared with Pep Guardiola)
- Most consecutive away wins in the history of La Liga: 13 games
- Manager with the lowest number of defeats after 100 games (in Spanish football): 8 losses
- Manager with most trophies after 100 games (in Spanish football): 7 titles
- Longest unbeaten run in Real Madrid history: 40 games
- Longest unbeaten run in Spanish football: 40 games
- First French manager, except the French-Argentinian Helenio Herrera, to win UEFA Champions League: 2015–16
- Longest scoring run (all major competitions) in European football: 73 games
- Only manager in history to win two consecutive UEFA Champions League trophies in its modern format: 2015–16, 2016–17
- Only manager to win three consecutive European Cup/UEFA Champions League finals: 2015–16, 2016–17, 2017–18
- Only manager in Real Madrid history to win four trophies in one season
- Only manager in Real Madrid history to win the UEFA Super Cup twice
- First manager to win two consecutive UEFA Super Cup titles since Arrigo Sacchi
- Quickest manager in the history of the Top 5 Leagues to win 7 titles with a single club: 19 months
- Quickest manager in the history of the Top 5 Leagues to win 8 titles with a single club: 23 months
- Quickest manager in history to be named FIFA Football Coach of the Year: 653 days
- Most The Best FIFA Football Coach awards: 3 in total
- Only person in history to win the Onze d'Or award as a player and as a manager
- Only person in history to win FIFA's Player of the Year award and Coach of the Year award
- Only person in history to win the IFFHS award as the best playmaker and as a manager
- Only person in history to win the FIFA Club World Cup trophy successively as a manager
- Only manager in Real Madrid history to win five trophies in a calendar year
- Only person in history to win the FIFA Club World Cup/Intercontinental Cup twice as a player and twice as a manager
- Only person in history to be named French Player of the Year twice and French Manager of the Year twice
- Highest score for a manager winning the IFFHS World's Best Club Coach award: 326 points
- First manager to reach three consecutive UEFA Champions League finals since Marcello Lippi: 2015–16, 2016–17, 2017–18

== See also ==
- List of UEFA Champions League winning managers
- List of footballers with 100 or more caps
- List of FIFA World Cup top goalscorers
- List of association football families
- Legion of Honour
- List of Legion of Honour recipients by name (Z)
- Legion of Honour Museum

== Notes ==
Preceded by Sergey Bubka	L'Équipe Champion of Champions; 1998	Succeeded by Andre Agassi
Preceded by Luc Alphand	French Sportsperson of the Year; 1998	Succeeded by Eunice Barber
