= Boukhelifa =

Coordinates: 36°36′52″N 5°05′14″E

Boukhelifa Buxlifa (Kabyle)
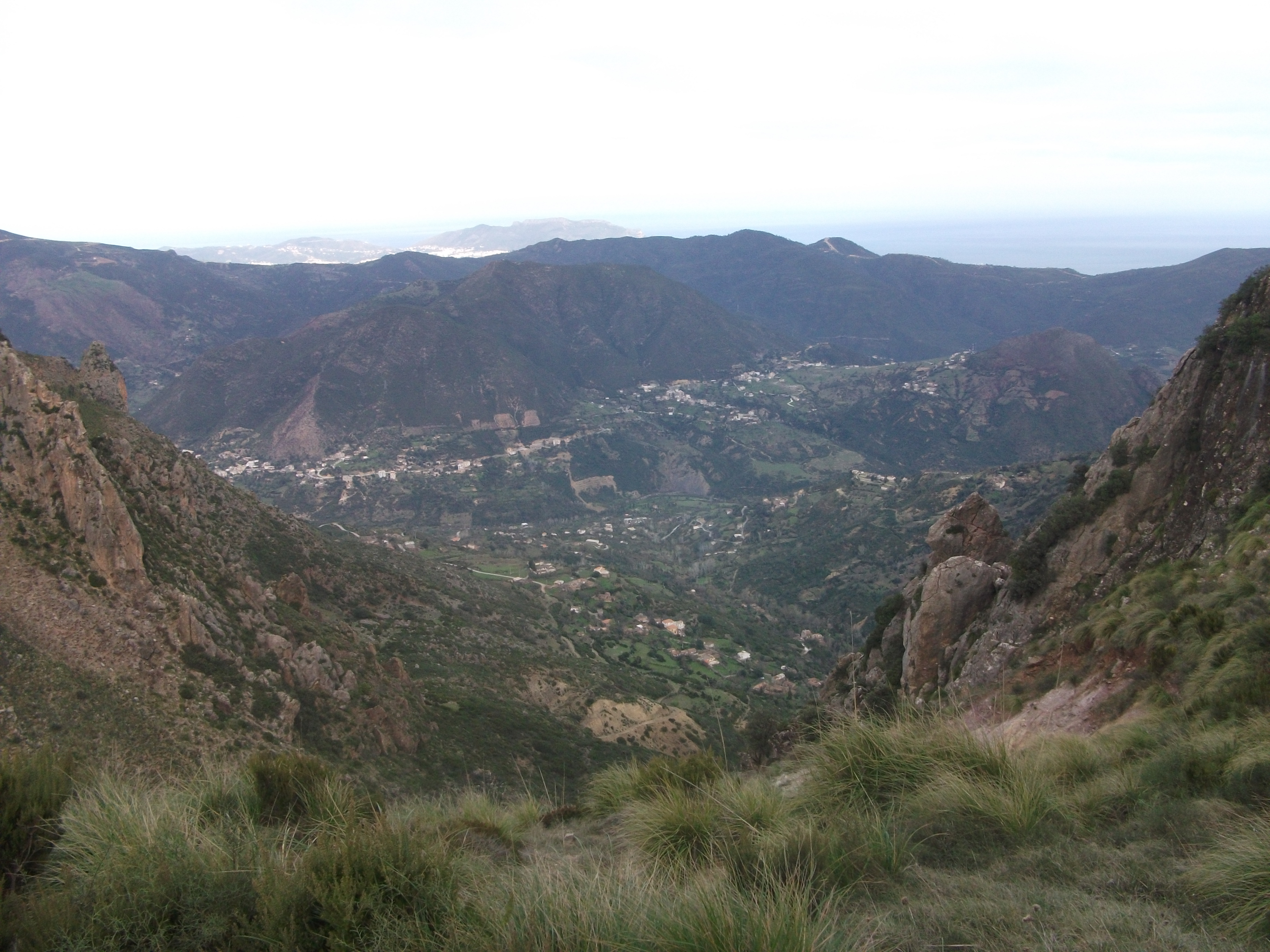
- Interactive map of Boukhelifa
- Country: Algeria
- Province: Bejaia
- Time zone: UTC+1 (West Africa Time)

Boukhelifa (Kabyle: Buxlifa) is a commune in northern Algeria in the Béjaïa Province.
