= Puma Clyde =

Athletic shoe released in 1973

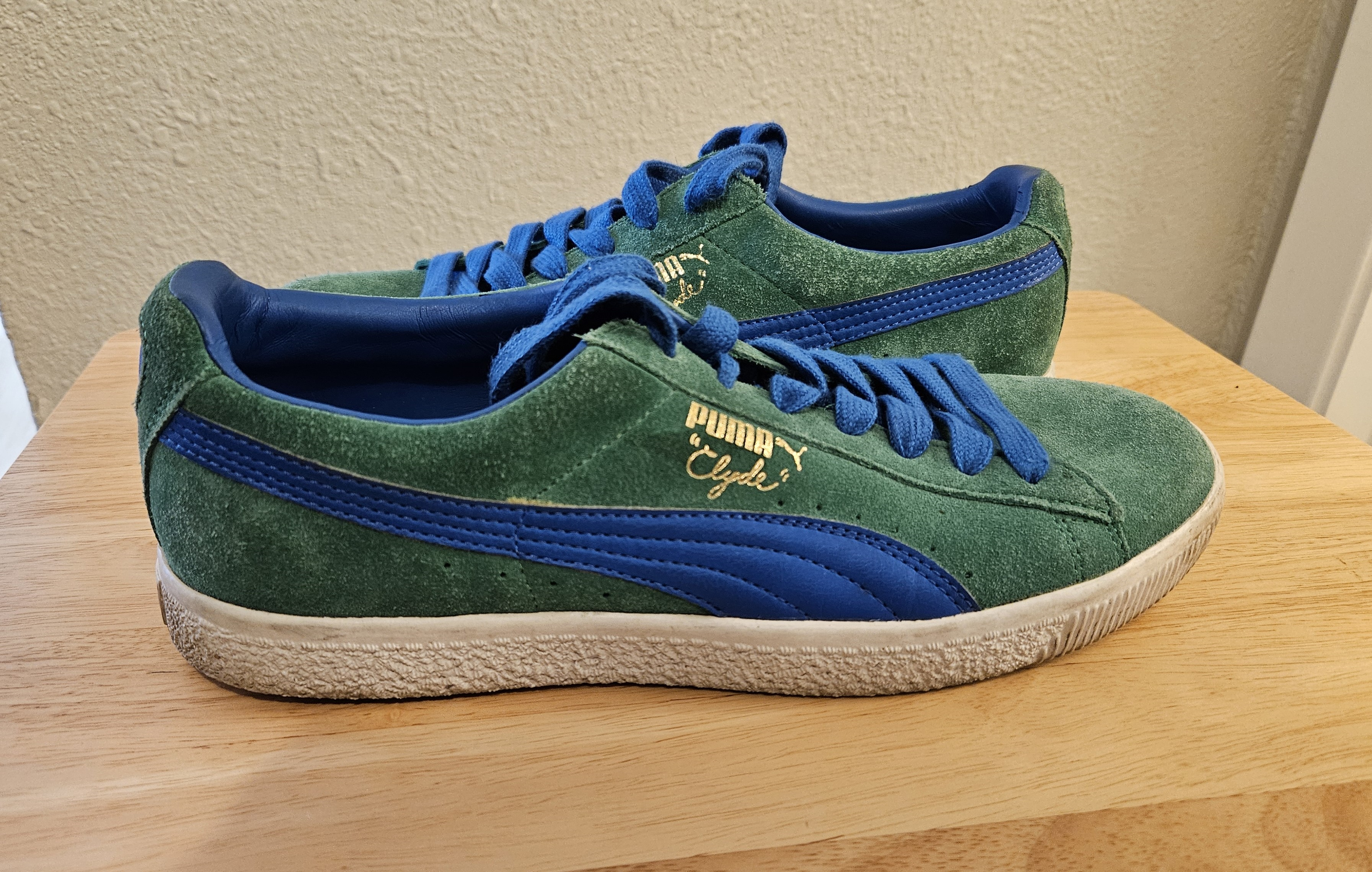
- Type: Sneakers
- Inventor: Puma
- Inception: 1973; 53 years ago
- Manufacturer: Puma
- Available: Yes

Puma Clyde is a line of shoes produced by Puma released in 1973. The shoe comes two models, a lifestyle model that is based on the original version and a basketball model which features all of the modern advancements and materials used in modern basketball shoes.

== Overview ==
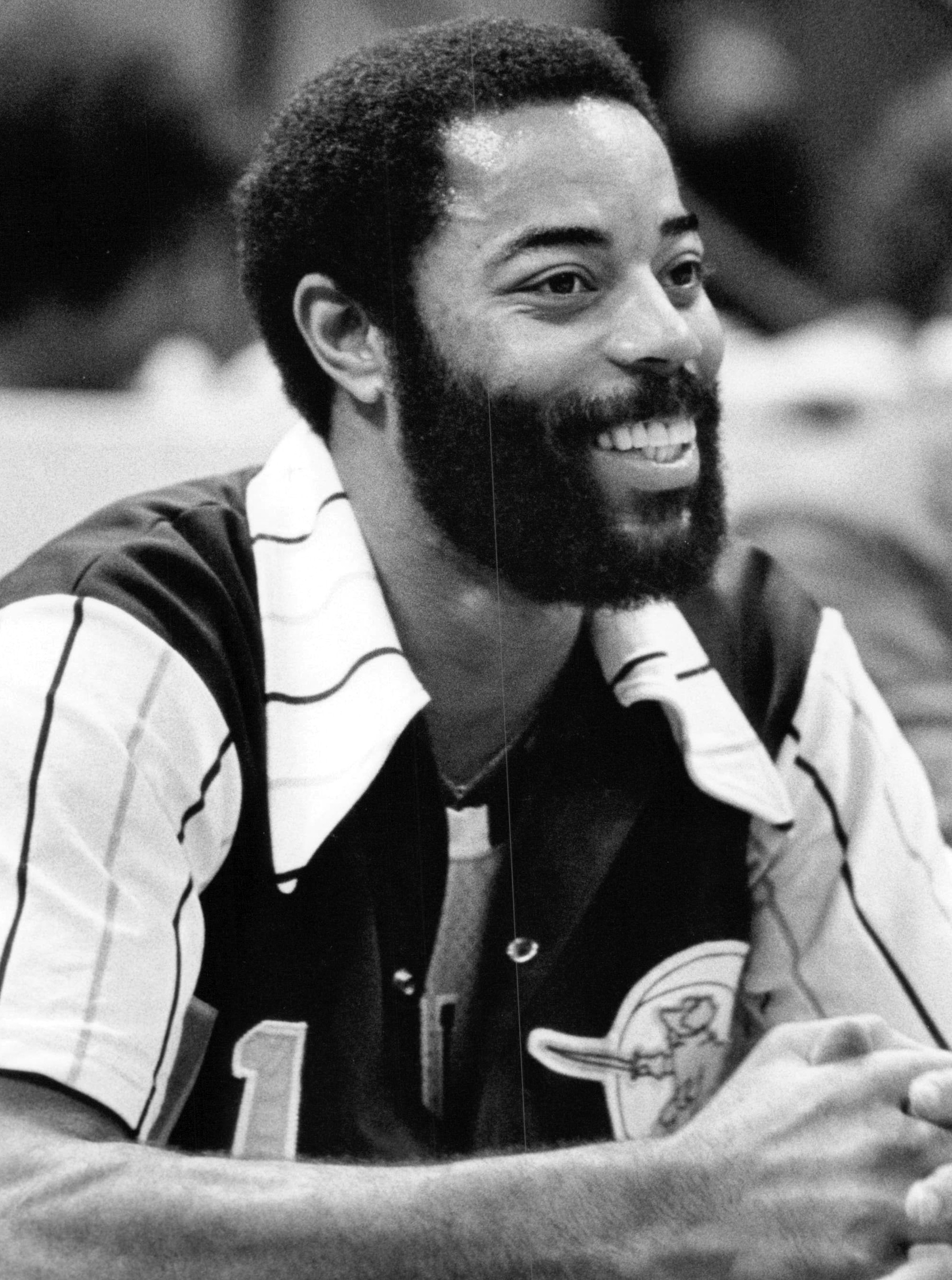
Walt Frazier, here pictured in 1977, gave his nickname Clyde to the brand of shoes

Puma wanted to continue its success it had and partner with a basketball player to help promote its brand. The company ultimately decided to work with Walt "Clyde" Frazier, who was known for always dressing extravagantly outside of games. Puma decided to sign Frazier to a deal and approached him with an offer.

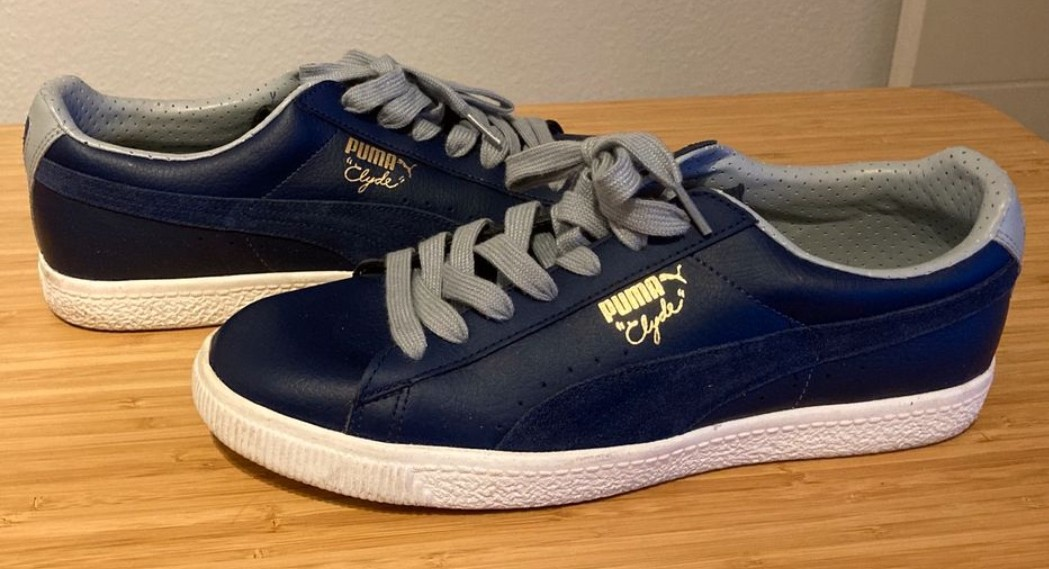
A blue pair of Puma Clyde shoes in leather material instead of the usual suede upper.

Originally, they wanted Frazier to wear the Puma Basket but Frazier refused because they were too clunky and he didn't like them. He told them he would sign with them if they made a new shoe and on 3 conditions: he wanted the first flat basketball kick to be made with suede instead of leather, his signature "Clyde" printed on every shoe, and a new color variation for every NBA game he participated in. The company agreed and work began that year.

Puma took the Puma Suede and modified it with input from Frazier in order to create a shoe that he felt comfortable playing in. The new shoe was made more narrow and has a more pointed toe box and the sole was improved and made more durable. Unnecessary aesthetic features were also removed. The new shoe was called the "Puma Clyde" and was released in 1973.

The shoe was met with great success and it was reported that Frazier wore all 390 different colors for the shoes throughout his career. Years later, in 2018, Frazier decided to sign a lifetime deal with Puma and the shoe was brought back.

== Models ==
=== Lifestyle ===
==== Clyde OG ====
The original release of the shoe with the same design and features.

==== Clyde Core Foil ====
Has the same design as the original but instead of a suede upper, it features a full leather upper.

=== Performance ===
==== Clyde Court Disrupt ====
After 20 years, Puma re-entered the basketball market and released a new shoe called the "Puma Clyde Court Disrupt" on September 21, 2018. The shoe was marketed as their flagship product for basketball.

==== Clyde Hardwood ====
Another performance shoe update to the Clyde line but designed to resemble the original shoe instead of modern basketball shoes. The shoe was debuted alongside New York Knick players and released on October 18, 2019.

==== Clyde All-Pro ====
The latest iteration of the modern Clyde line, the "Puma Clyde All-Pro" was released on November 19, 2020. The shoe was designed with Puma's own technology including a Pebax drop in the heel, ProFoam+ in the midsole, and an upper made with their own Matryx knit. The shoe was promoted by Kyle Kuzma.
