= Armin Dassler =

Former CEO of Puma (1929–1990)

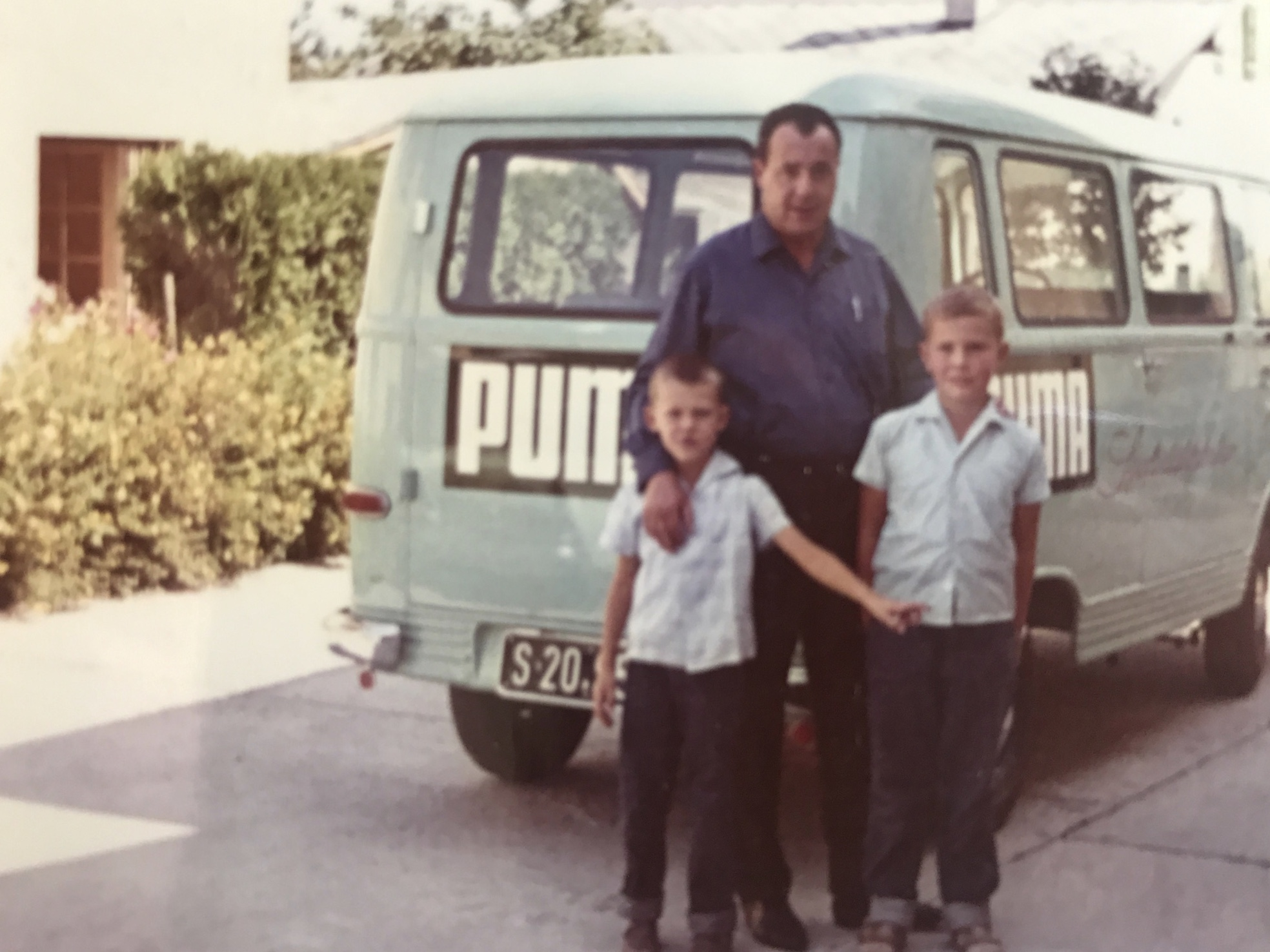
- Dassler in Salzburg with his two sons
- Born: Armin A. Dassler; 15 September 1929; Herzogenaurach, Bavaria, Weimar Republic
- Died: 14 October 1990 (aged 61); Herzogenaurach, Germany
- Occupation: Entrepreneur
- Known for: CEO of Puma
- Father: Rudolf Dassler
- Relatives: Adolf Dassler (uncle)

Armin Dassler (15 September 1929 – 10 October 1990) was a German businessman, the son of Rudolf Dassler, founder of the sportswear company Puma and nephew of Adidas founder, Adolf Dassler.

Dassler expanded Puma from a small provincial company to a much larger worldwide business.
