= Dassler brothers feud =

Conflict between shoe manufacturers

The Dassler brothers conflict was a conflict between two brothers and their respective shoe manufacturers, Adolf ("Adi") and Rudolf ("Rudi") Dassler, in the latter half of the 20th century. Their feud led to the creation of Adidas and Puma, two of the largest shoe manufacturing companies in the world, and started a long-lasting rivalry between the two companies, reflected in rivalries between football clubs and a culture of animosity between Puma and Adidas employees that divided their home town. The most notable event that fuelled the rivalry was the "Pelé Pact", where both agreed not to sign a deal with Pelé for the 1970 World Cup, feeling that a bidding war for the most famous athlete in the world would become too expensive, only for Puma to break the pact and sign him.

== History ==
Both brothers were born in Herzogenaurach, part of the German Empire (today part of Bavaria, Germany), to a middle-class family. Rudolf was born in 1898, and Adolf was born in 1900.

In 1919, they founded the shoe manufacturing company Gebrüder Dassler Schuhfabrik, or Geda for short. (Gebrüder translates into English as brothers.) Both brothers became members of the Nazi party in 1933. Geda became a success during the 1930s and 1940s, which was demonstrated in the 1936 Olympics where the legendary African-American runner Jesse Owens wore Geda shoes as he won a gold medal. Geda's operations were paused throughout World War II, as Rudolf was drafted into the German army and Geda's shoe factory was converted into a weapons factory. After the war ended, Rudolf returned, and Geda's operations resumed.

In 1948, after over 30 years of working together, Adolf and Rudolf abruptly shuttered Geda and separated. Two reasons for the feud that are cited are strife between their respective wives, who did not get along, yet were forced to live in the same villa, and Rudolf's increasing suspicion that his brother Adi was behind his conscription into the army and thus his short imprisonment by the Allies.

In 1948 Rudolf established Puma, which was initially named Ruda (short for Rudolf Dassler) but later was renamed Puma after the animal. In 1949, Adolf established Adidas, likewise named for himself (Adi Dassler). Geda's workforce and resources were split between the brothers. Adidas kept the factory by the train station and two-thirds of Geda's employees, as most employees preferred Adolf's emphasis on product development over Rudolf's sales-oriented approach. Rudolf kept the factory on Würzburger Street and the remaining third of the workforce.

In the following three decades, both Adidas and Puma rose to dominance and signed deals with athletes such as Muhammad Ali and Joe Frazier (Adidas) and members of the Brazil national football team (Puma). Adidas introduced shoes customized for different sports, and grew rapidly. Puma, driven by Rudolf's sophisticated sales approach, kept chasing Adidas throughout these decades.

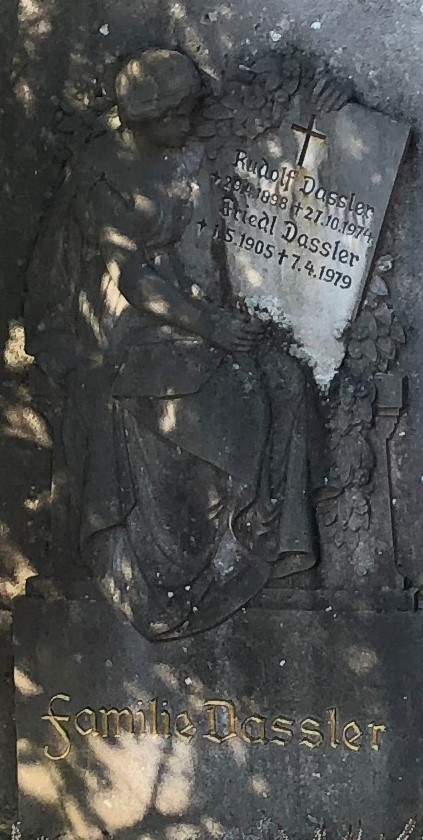
Rudolf Dassler's grave

Rudolf died in 1974 followed by Adolf in 1978. The brothers were buried at opposite ends of Herzogenaurach's cemetery.

== Division within Herzogenaurach ==
The river Aurach divides Herzogenaurach; Puma's factory was to the south and Adidas's factory to the north. Puma and Adidas were the biggest employers there, and at least one person from each family worked for one of these companies. Employees of the two firms and their families avoided speaking to each other; they patronized separate bars, bakeries and barber shops. From people's habit of looking at each other's shoes to see whether they were affiliated with Adidas or Puma, Herzogenaurach got the nickname "the town of bent necks". After the deaths of both Dassler brothers in the 1970s, the division gradually waned in importance.

The two biggest football clubs in Herzogenaurach, FC Herzogenaurach and ASV Herzogenaurach, were sponsored by Puma and Adidas respectively. As a result, a strong sporting and personal rivalry formed between the players and the fans of each of these teams.

== World Cups ==
West Germany was allowed to participate in the 1954 World Cup, the first to be televised; Adidas and Puma worked to change people's perception of their sporting brands and achieve international exposure. Since the rift between the West German national team's manager, Sepp Herberger, and Rudolf prevented Puma from sponsoring the West German national team, Adidas sponsored the team and supplied kits and boots to its players. The West German team defeated the favorites, Hungary, and won its first World Cup. As a result, Adidas received positive international coverage. Adidas was able to get a hold in the international shoe market and grow faster and become bigger than Puma.

In the 1970 World Cup, Puma won the business battle. The most famous athlete in the world at that time was Brazilian footballer Pelé, and prior to the tournament the Dassler brothers agreed the "Pelé Pact" where neither company would sponsor Pelé with the belief that a bidding war would become too expensive. Puma however would break the pact, and pursuant to a sponsorship deal, Pelé asked the referee to delay the start of Brazil's quarter-final game against Peru so that he could tie his shoes, and thus all the cameras were focused on his Puma King boots. In the semi-final game against Uruguay, Pelé repeated the act. Pelé led Brazil to glory, winning the 1970 World Cup, and his star power greatly contributed to the improvement of Puma's image in the eyes of the public and led to an increase in sales.

== Legacy ==
Praised as a shrewd marketing move by Puma, the Pelé deal fuelled the Dassler brothers' rivalry, and many business experts credit the rivalry and competition between Adidas and Puma for transforming sports apparel into a multi-billion pound industry. The breaking of the Pelé Pact is featured in Barbara Smit's book, Sneaker Wars: The Enemy Brothers Who Founded Adidas and Puma and the Family Feud That Forever Changed the Business of Sports.

== Bibliography ==
- Smit, Barbara (2008). Sneaker Wars: The Enemy Brothers who Founded Adidas and Puma and the Family Feud that Forever Changed the Business of Sport. New York: CCCO/HarperCollins Publishers. p. 4. ISBN 9780061246579.
