= Horst Dassler =

German businessman (1936–1987)

- Born: 12 March 1936; Erlangen, Middle Franconia, Germany
- Died: 10 April 1987 (aged 51); Erlangen or Herzogenaurach, Middle Franconia, West Germany
- Occupation: Entrepreneur
- Years active: 1960–1987
- Known for: Executive of Adidas; Founder of Arena
- Spouse: Monika
- Children: 2
- Father: Adolf Dassler
- Relatives: Rudolf Dassler (uncle)

Horst Dassler (12 March 1936 – 10 April 1987) was a German businessman, the son of Adolf Dassler, founder of the sportswear company Adidas and nephew of Puma founder, Rudolf Dassler.

He founded Arena, a swimwear company, and became chairman of Adidas in 1984. At the time of his death it was the world's largest sporting goods manufacturer, with affiliates in 40 nations. Horst was also known as the father of sports sponsorship as a result of his separate business of managing rights for the world governing bodies of football and the Olympics.

== Career at Adidas ==
In 1960, Dassler joined Adidas, his father's firm, and founded an Adidas affiliate in Alsace that later became the dominant sporting goods manufacturer in France. Among Dassler's achievements was the founding of the Arena line of swimwear in 1973. Dassler had been impressed by the performance of Mark Spitz at the 1972 Munich Olympics. Having developed an ultra-light fabric, Dassler persuaded Australian swimmer Shane Gould to enter a sponsorship agreement to promote the Shane Gould Female Swimsuit Collection. Dassler continued to sign athletes to sponsorship deals and by the 1976 Montreal Olympics the "Arena Elite Team" included Mark Spitz, Novella Calligaris, Steve Furniss, David Wilkie, Shirley Babashoff, Gary Hall Sr., Klaus Dibiasi, Ulrika Knape, and Micki King. Beyond signing individual athletes, Dassler led Adidas's pioneering drive to sign national sports federations and Olympic committees to exclusive shoe and apparel contracts. Although Adidas lost a considerable share of this business after Dassler's death, even five years later Adidas had ties with about 100 companies.

After the death of his father in 1978, Dassler's mother Käthe became chairman of the company and Dassler returned to Germany to take his place in the top management of the firm. When his mother died in 1984, Dassler assumed the office of chairman, a position he retained until his death.

On assuming control, Dassler was immediately faced with the challenge of increasing competition for sports shoeware: Nike was eroding Adidas's market share in the United States and Japan, and Puma, a company founded by Dassler's uncle after a dispute with his father, had increased its sales of athletic footwear by 35% the previous year. Dassler responded to the challenge by installing a professional management team at company headquarters to replace family members. In the United States, where Adidas's sales had slipped to one third of Nike's, Dassler attempted to diversify distribution channels and respond to a shift in consumer demand from athletic to casual footwear, a shift that Adidas had failed to satisfy.

== Career as sports marketer ==
Horst Dassler was known as the father of sport sponsorship. In the mid-1970s, Dassler formed arguably the first sports marketing firm with British advertising executive Patrick J. Nally. The two approached newly elected FIFA President João Havelange, who believed that the soccer body was not maximizing revenues. Dassler proposed obtaining corporate sponsorships for the World Cup and other activities of FIFA. It took the two 18 months of high-pressure salesmanship to persuade Coca-Cola to become FIFA's first corporate sponsor, committing $8 million. Coca-Cola thus became the first exclusive worldwide sponsor of a sporting association. Dassler and Nally continued acquiring sponsorships from blue-chip companies like McDonald's and Levi Strauss. Dassler's business practices had few limits and David Yallop in his book How they Stole the Game says his relationship with Havelange was Drahtzieher: Dassler was the "puppetmaster." In the 1982, Dassler broke with Nally and established ISL Marketing A.G. (ISL), a firm which continued marketing FIFA rights but also added television rights to the advertising package which it bought up en masse from FIFA.

In May 1985, ISL was selected to manage the corporate sponsorship program of the International Olympic Committee (IOC). The highly lucrative contract was awarded without competitive bidding, and even without providing the opportunity to Nally's rival marketing company, West Nally, Ltd., to make an alternative proposal. Many suspected that personal relations between Adidas and the IOC were behind the private arrangement. IOC President Juan Antonio Samaranch denied any impropriety, and Dassler, claiming to be motivated solely by good will for the Olympics movement, denied he had a conflict of interest. According to British sports journalists Vyv Simson and Andrew Jennings, Dassler and ISL were largely responsible for turning the Olympics into a hugely successful revenue-generating enterprise. Dassler used his contacts to obtain Olympic sponsorship by Coca-Cola and other important companies, and obtained Olympic financing from Monte Carlo banks. Years later, Samaranch was the main eulogist at Dassler's funeral.

Years after Dassler's death, in May 2001 ISL filed for bankruptcy, with a stated net debt of $300 million.

== Death ==
Horst Dassler died on 10 April 1987 from complications due to cancer. He left behind his wife Monika and two children, Suzanne and Adi.
