= Puma (brand) =

German clothing and consumer goods manufacturer

Puma SE

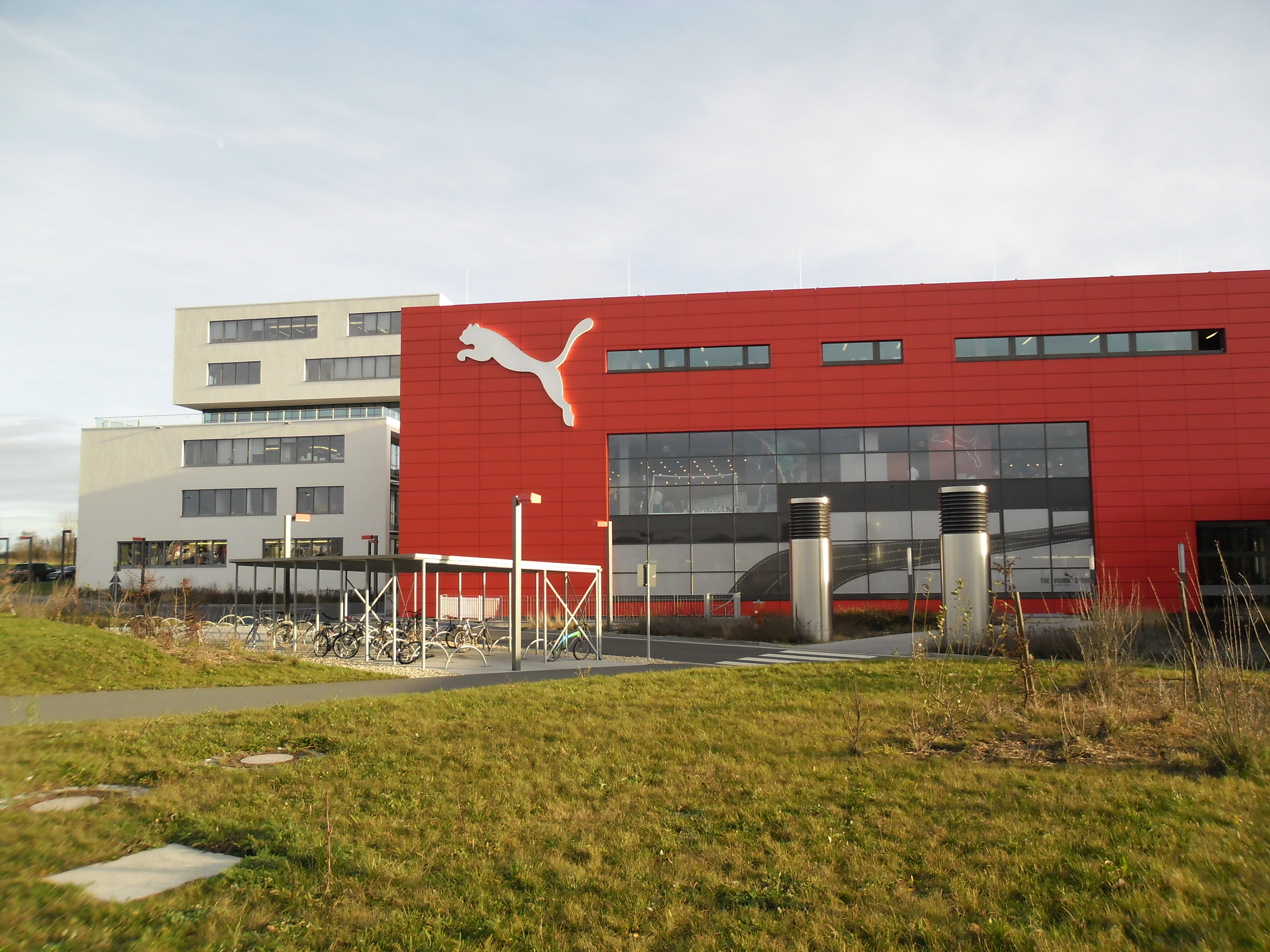
- World headquarters in Herzogenaurach
- Type: Public (SE)
- Traded as: FWB: PUM; MDAX Component
- ISIN: DE0006969603
- Industry: Textile; Footwear
- Predecessor: Split from Dassler Brothers Shoe Factory
- Founded: 1948; 78 years ago
- Founder: Rudolf Dassler
- Headquarters: Herzogenaurach, Bavaria, Germany
- Area served: Worldwide
- Key people: Arthur Hoeld (CEO); Markus Neubrand (CFO); Maria Valdes (CPO); Héloïse Temple-Boyer (chair)
- Products: Sportswear; Footwear; Sports equipment; Apparel; Accessories
- Revenue: ▲€8.601 billion (2023)
- Operating income: ▼€621 million (2023)
- Net income: ▼€304.9 million (2023)
- Total assets: ▼€6.640 billion (2023)
- Total equity: ▲€2.582 billion (2023)
- Owners: Anta (29.06%); Frasers Group (5.77%); T. Rowe Price (5%); BlackRock (4%)
- Number of employees: ▲18,681 (2023)
- Subsidiaries: Cobra Golf; stichd; Fuel for Fans
- Website: puma.com

Puma SE is a German athletic apparel and footwear corporation headquartered in Herzogenaurach, Bavaria, Germany. Puma is the third largest sportswear manufacturer in the world.

The company was founded in 1948 by Rudolf Dassler (1898–1974). In 1924, Rudolf and his brother Adolf "Adi" Dassler had jointly formed the company Gebrüder Dassler Schuhfabrik ('Dassler Brothers Shoe Factory'). The relationship between the two brothers deteriorated until they agreed to split in 1948, forming two separate entities, Adidas and Puma. Following the split, Rudolf originally registered the newly established company as Ruda (derived from Rudolf Dassler, as Adidas was based on Adi Dassler), but later changed the name to Puma. Puma's earliest logo consisted of a square and beast jumping through a D, which was registered, along with the company's name, in 1948. Puma's shoe and clothing designs feature the Puma logo and the distinctive "Formstrip" which was introduced in 1958.

As of 2022, Puma is operational in over 120 countries worldwide.

== History ==
=== Background ===
Christoph Dassler was a worker in a shoe factory, while his wife Pauline ran a small laundry in the Franconian town of Herzogenaurach, 20 km (12.4 mi) from the city of Nuremberg. After leaving school, their son, Rudolf Dassler, joined his father at the shoe factory. When he returned from fighting in World War I, Rudolf was trained as a salesman at a porcelain factory, and later in a leather trading business in Nuremberg.

In July 1924, Rudolf and his younger brother, Adolf, nicknamed "Adi", founded a shoe factory. They named the new business "Gebrüder Dassler Schuhfabrik" (Dassler Brothers Shoe Factory) which was the only business at the time that manufactured sports shoes. The pair started their venture in their mother's laundry. At the time, electricity supplies in the town were unreliable, and the brothers sometimes had to use pedal power from a stationary bicycle to run their equipment. In 1927, they moved into a separate building.

The brothers drove from Bavaria to the 1936 Summer Olympics in Berlin with a suitcase full of spikes and persuaded United States sprinter Jesse Owens to use them, the first sponsorship for an African American. Owens won four gold medals. Business boomed; the Dasslers were selling 200,000 pairs of shoes annually before World War II.

Both brothers joined the Nazi Party, but Rudolf was a keen Nazi, who applied to join, and was accepted into the Gestapo; they produced boots for the Wehrmacht. A growing rift between the brothers reached a breaking point during a 1943 Allied bomb attack. Adi and his wife climbed into a bomb shelter that Rudolf and his family were already in. "Here are the bloody bastards again," Adi remarked, apparently referring to the Allied warplanes, but Rudolf, due to his apparent insecurity, was convinced his brother meant him and his family. When Rudolf was later picked up by American soldiers and accused of being a member of the Waffen SS, he was convinced that his brother had turned him in.

=== Split and creation of Puma ===
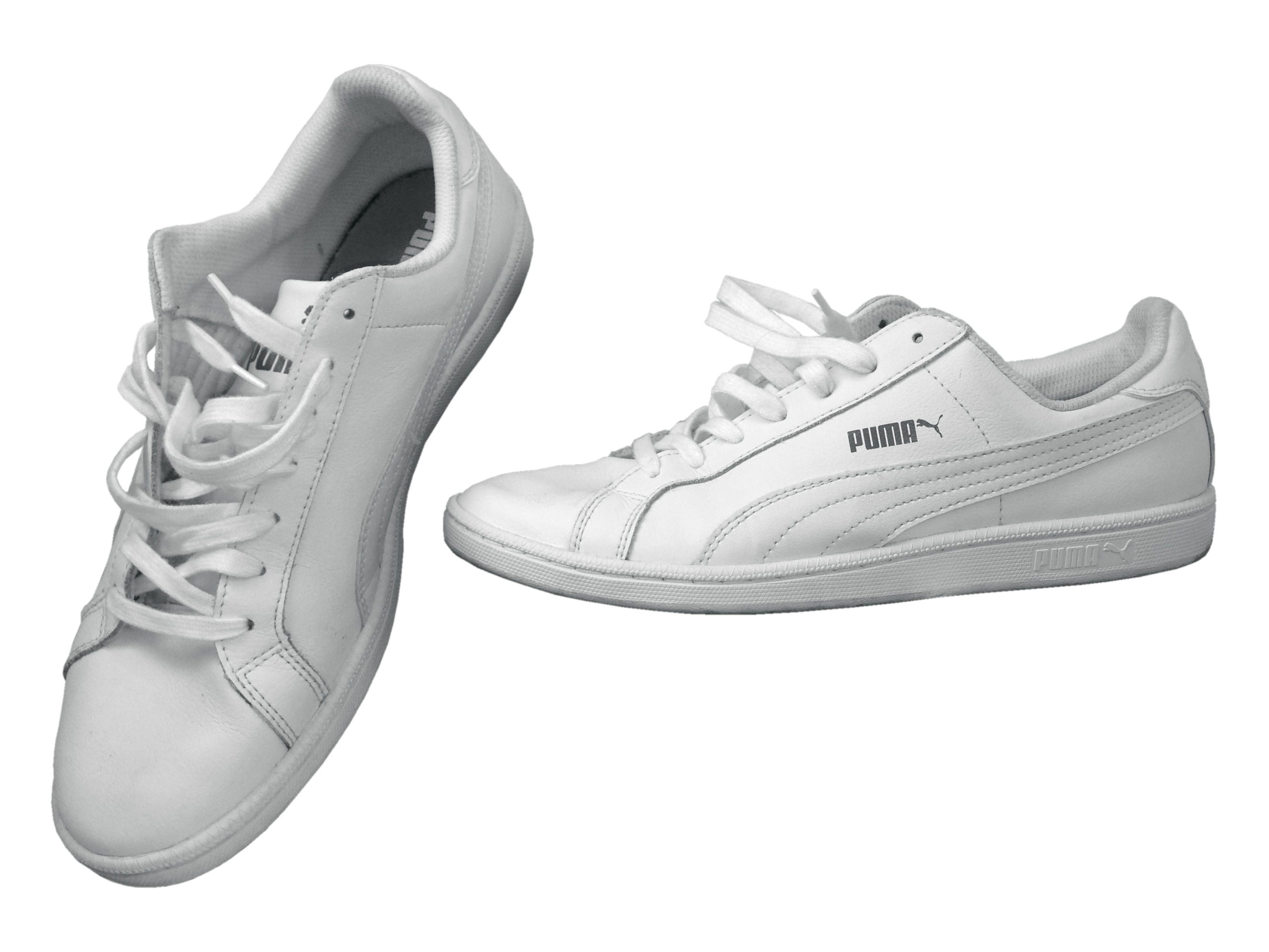
A pair of Puma Smash Leather, lifestyle shoes

After increasingly different views of how to run the business, the brothers split the business in 1948. Rudolf moved to the other side of the Aurach River to start his own company. Adolf started his own company using a name he formed using his nickname—Adi—and the first three letters of his last name—Das—to establish Adidas. Rudolf created a new firm that he called "Ruda", from "Ru" in Rudolf and "Da" in Dassler. A few months later, Rudolf's company changed its name to Puma Schuhfabrik Rudolf Dassler.

Puma and Adidas entered a fierce and bitter rivalry. The town of Herzogenaurach was divided on the issue, leading to the nickname "the town of bent necks"—people looked down to see which shoes strangers wore.

In the first football match after World War II in 1948, several members of the West Germany national football team wore Puma boots, including the scorer of West Germany's first post-war goal, Herbert Burdenski. Rudolf developed a football boot with screw-in studs, called the "Super Atom" in collaboration with people such as West Germany's national coach Sepp Herberger.

=== Olympic presence, World Cup, and the Pelé Pact ===
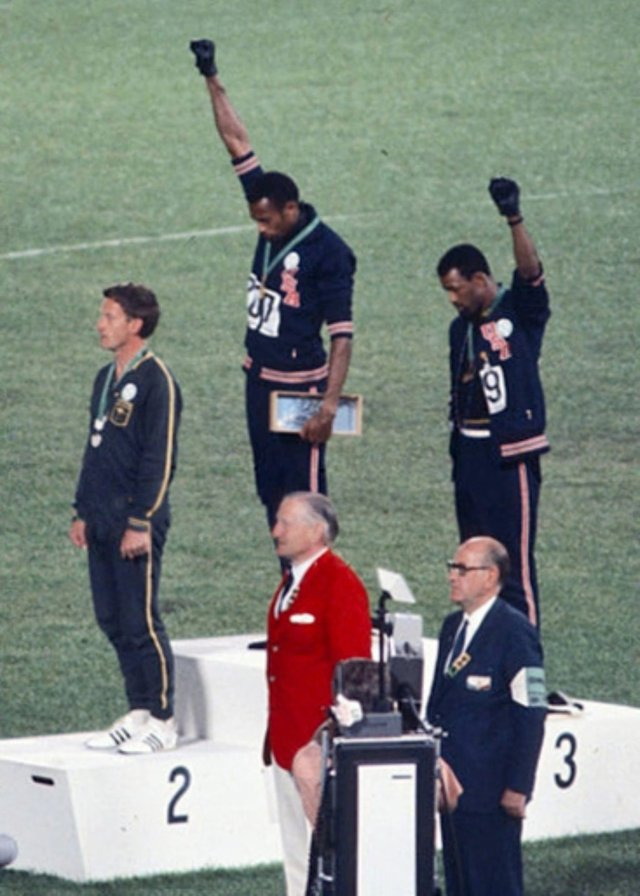
Puma-sponsored gold medalist Tommie Smith (center) and bronze medalist John Carlos (right) showing the raised fist at the 1968 Summer Olympics

At the 1952 Summer Olympics, 1500 metres runner Josy Barthel of Luxembourg won Puma's first Olympic gold in Helsinki, Finland.

At the 1960 Summer Olympics, Puma paid German sprinter Armin Hary to wear Pumas in the 100-metre sprint final. Hary had previously worn Adidas products and approached Adolf for compensation. However, Adidas declined the request. Despite winning a gold medal in Pumas, Hary chose to wear Adidas during the medals ceremony, surprising the two Dassler brothers. Hary seemingly aimed to benefit financially from both brands, but Adolf was infuriated to the extent of banning the Olympic champion.

During the 1968 Olympics Black Power Salute, Puma-sponsored African-American athletes Tommie Smith and John Carlos, after having won gold and bronze in the 200 meters, respectively, took to the podium with their Puma Suede shoes in hand and bowed their heads and raised their black-gloved fists in silent protest during the playing of the national anthem, as a show of their support for human rights and to stand up for black Americans.

A few months before the 1970 FIFA World Cup, Armin Dassler (Rudolf's son) of Puma and his cousin Horst Dassler (Adi's son) of Adidas signed "the Pelé Pact", an agreement that neither company would contract with Pelé, the world's most famous athlete. The companies reasoned that a bidding war for Pelé would be too expensive. Puma soon broke the pact and signed him.

In addition to paying Pelé a proportion of Puma King boot sales, Puma paid him $120,000 ($2.85 million in 2022) to tie his laces prior to Brazil's quarter-final game against Peru to advertise their boots. An idea conceived by Puma's representative Hans Henningsen, Pelé stopped the referee from starting the game with a last-second request to tie his shoelaces, and with the camera panning in on Pelé, the Puma King boots were broadcast to a global audience, generating enormous publicity for the brand.

The most notable event in the Dassler brothers feud, the breaking of the "Pelé Pact" outraged Horst, and future peace agreements were called off. The Puma deal for Pelé was praised as a shrewd marketing move, and many business experts credit the rivalry and competition between the two companies for transforming sports apparel into a highly lucrative industry.

During the 1972 Summer Olympics, Puma provided shoes for the Ugandan 400 metres hurdles champion, John Akii-Bua. After Akii-Bua was forced out of Uganda by its military government, Puma employed him in Germany. Eventually, Akii-Bua returned to Uganda.

Puma launched the Puma Clyde in 1973, a basketball shoe based on the Suede. Designed for basketball player Walt "Clyde" Frazier, it gained wide popularity and became significant in the old school hip hop and skate punk subcultures.

=== Going public ===
Puma became a public company in 1986, and thereafter was listed on the Börse München and Frankfurt Stock Exchange; its first profit since the IPO was registered in 1994. In May 1989, Rudolf's sons Armin and Gerd Dassler sold their 72% stake in Puma to Swiss business Cosa Liebermann SA. In 2001, Puma bought Scandinavian Tretorn Group, and in 2015 sold it to Authentic Brands Group. For the fiscal year 2003, the company had revenue of €1.274 billion, and majority shareholder Monarchy/Regency sold its shareholdings to a broad base of institutional investors.

In February 2007, Puma reported that its profits had fallen by 26% to €32.8 million ($43 million; £22 million) during the final three months of 2006. Most of the decline was due to higher costs linked to its expansion; sales rose by more than a third to €480.6 million. In early April, Puma's share price rose by €29.25, or about 10.2%, to €315.24 per share. On 10 April, the French conglomerate PPR (which became Kering in 2013) announced that it had bought a 27% stake in Puma, clearing the way for a full takeover. The deal valued Puma at €5.3 billion. PPR said that it would launch a friendly takeover, worth €330 per share, once the acquisition of the smaller stake was completed. The board of Puma welcomed the move, saying it was fair and in the firm's best interests. As of July 2007, PPR owned over 60% of Puma stock.

In 2008, Melody Harris-Jensbach was appointed deputy chief executive officer; designer and artist Hussein Chalayan became creative director, and Puma acquired a majority stake in Chalayan's fashion business.

=== 2010 onward ===
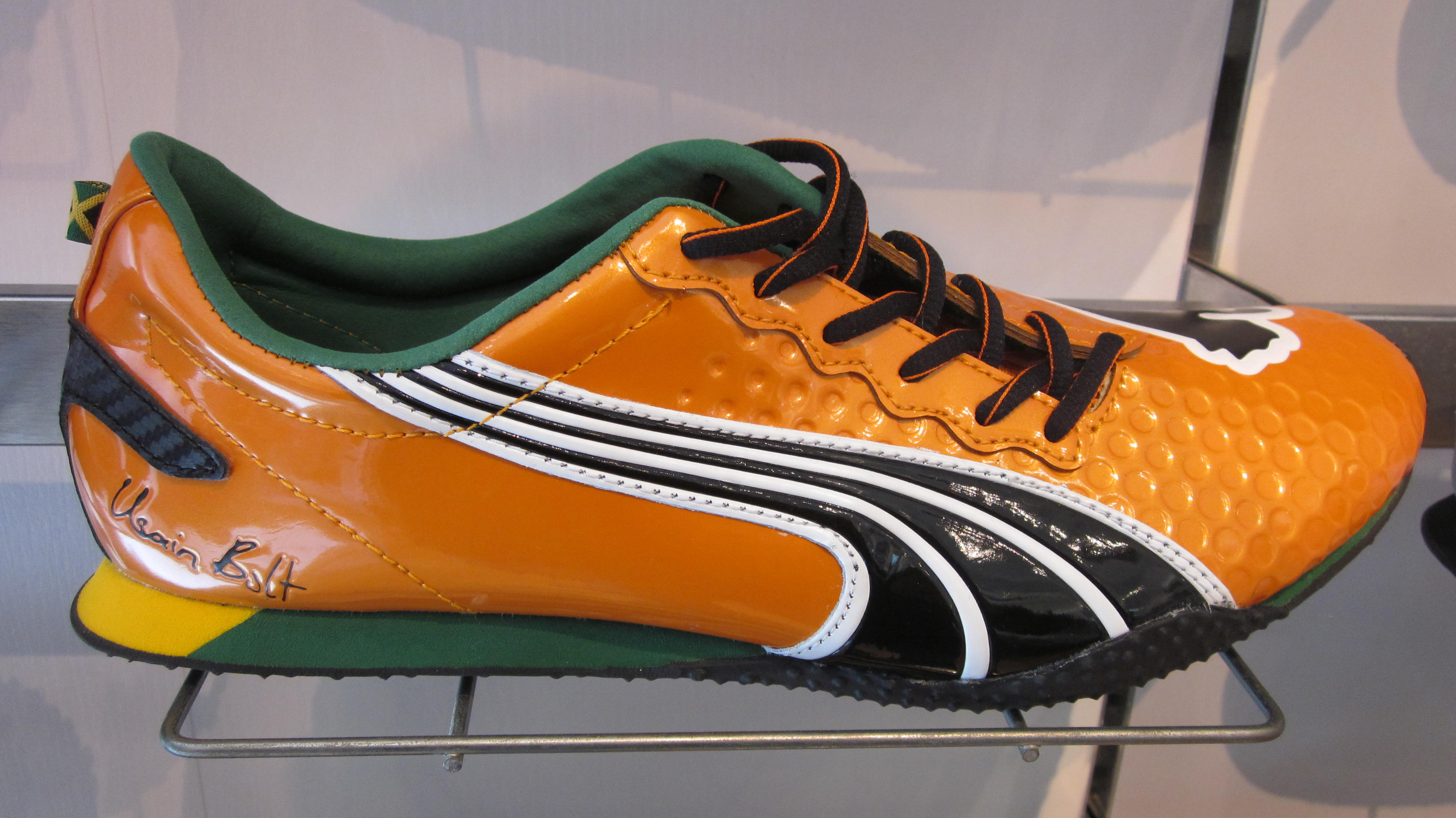
A Puma Street Yaam

In 2010, Puma bought Cobra Golf, and in 2010 bought bodywear and socks company Dobotex. In July 2011, the company completed a conversion from an Aktiengesellschaft (German public limited company) to a Societas Europaea, the European Union-wide equivalent, changing its name from Puma AG Rudolf Dassler Sport to Puma SE. At the same time, Franz Koch replaced the long-serving Jochen Zeitz as the firm's chief executive officer (CEO), with Zeitz becoming chairman. Starting in July 2013, the company was led by former football professional Bjørn Gulden. In 2022 Arne Freundt was appointed CEO .

In April 2025, Puma announced that CEO Arne Freundt would step down due to differing views on strategy with the supervisory board. He is to be succeeded by Arthur Hoeld, a former Adidas executive, effective 1 July 2025.

In January 2026, the Chinese sports equipment multinational corporation Anta Sports agreed to acquire a 29.06 % stake in Puma SE for approximately €1.5 billion, becoming the German sportswear company's largest shareholder.

On 5 March 2026, Frasers Group took an almost 6% stake in Puma, becoming its second-largest shareholder.

== Finances ==
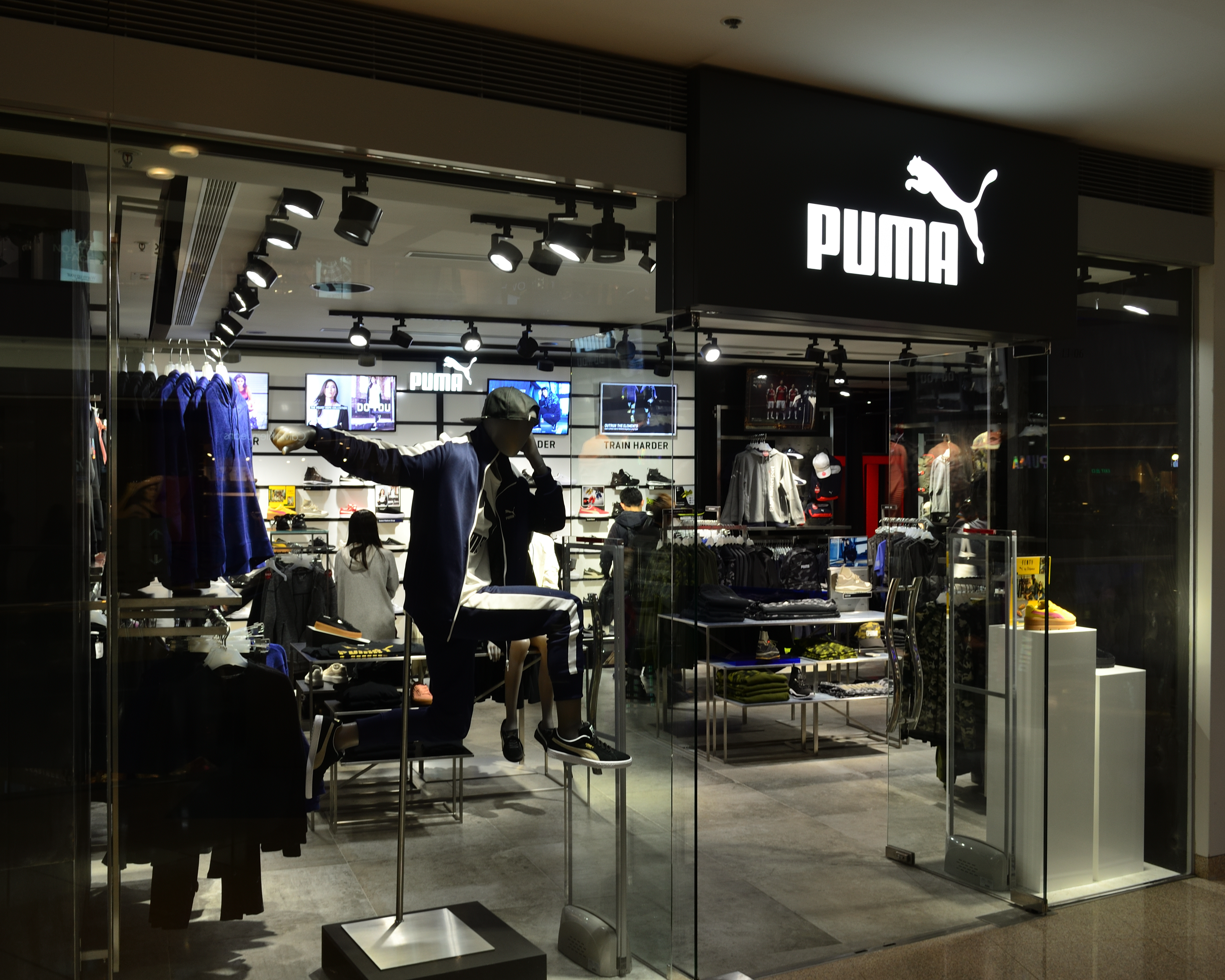
Puma store in Hong Kong

Puma has been a public company since 1986, listed on the Frankfurt Stock Exchange. French luxury group Kering (formerly known as PPR) holds 9.8%, Kering's largest shareholder Groupe Artemis owns 29% of the share capital.

Puma ranks as one of the top shoe brands with Adidas and Nike, and employs more than 18,000 people worldwide. The company has corporate offices around the world, including four defined as "central hubs": Assembly Row, Somerville, Massachusetts; Hong Kong; Ho Chi Minh City, Vietnam; and global headquarters in Herzogenaurach, Germany.

Financial data in € millions
Year	2013	2014	2015	2016	2017	2018	2019	2020	2021	2022	2023
Revenue	2,985	2,972	3,387	3,627	4,136	4,648	5,502	5,234	6,805	8,465	8,601
Net Income	5	64	37	62	136	187	262	79	310	353	304.9
Assets	2,309	2,550	2,620	2,765	2,854	3,207	4,378	4,684	5,728	6,772	6,640
Employees	10,750	10,830	11,351	11,495	11,787	12,894	14,332	14,374	16,125	18,071	18,681

Puma utilizes social media marketing activities (SMMA) to leverage customer purchases in Indonesia and boost brand awareness, brand image, and brand equity. Purchase intention was significantly influenced by brand awareness caused by SMMA. When consumers are more aware of Puma and have a positive image of the brand, they are more likely to purchase its products. Puma's social media marketing strategies have a direct effect on purchase intentions, which is a leading indicator of actual sales, especially in the middle class.

Through supply chain finance, Puma helps suppliers avoid cash flow issues by offering early payment on invoices, reducing costs and risk. The company uses the Infor Nexus digital platform to streamline the process, connecting buyers, suppliers, and banks. This platform enables fast, electronic payment and provides transparency, reducing manual work for suppliers and offering quicker access to financing, with payments made within five days of delivery.

On 27 January, shares of Puma surged after Anta Sports revealed its acquisition of a 29% stake as Puma works to turn itself around amid struggling sales and brand momentum.

== Sponsorships ==
International footballers Pelé, Diego Maradona, Eusébio, Johan Cruyff, Lothar Matthäus, Gianluigi Buffon, Paul "Gazza" Gascoigne, Jay-Jay Okocha, Falcão, Chris Waddle, Samuel Eto’o, Robert Pires, Freddie Ljungberg and Michael Carrick used Puma boots.

In 2026, the biggest stars under its name are, Neymar JR., Alessandro Bastoni, Christian Pulisic, Cody Gakpo, Daniel Carvajal, Destiny Udogiem, Diogo Dalot, Ederson, Granit Xhaka, Harry Maguire, Jack Grealish, Kai Havertz, Manuel Akanji, Marc Cucurella, Mateo Kovačić, Memphis Depay, Theo Hernández, Wataru Endo, Weston Mckennie and Xavi Simons.

Puma football shoes

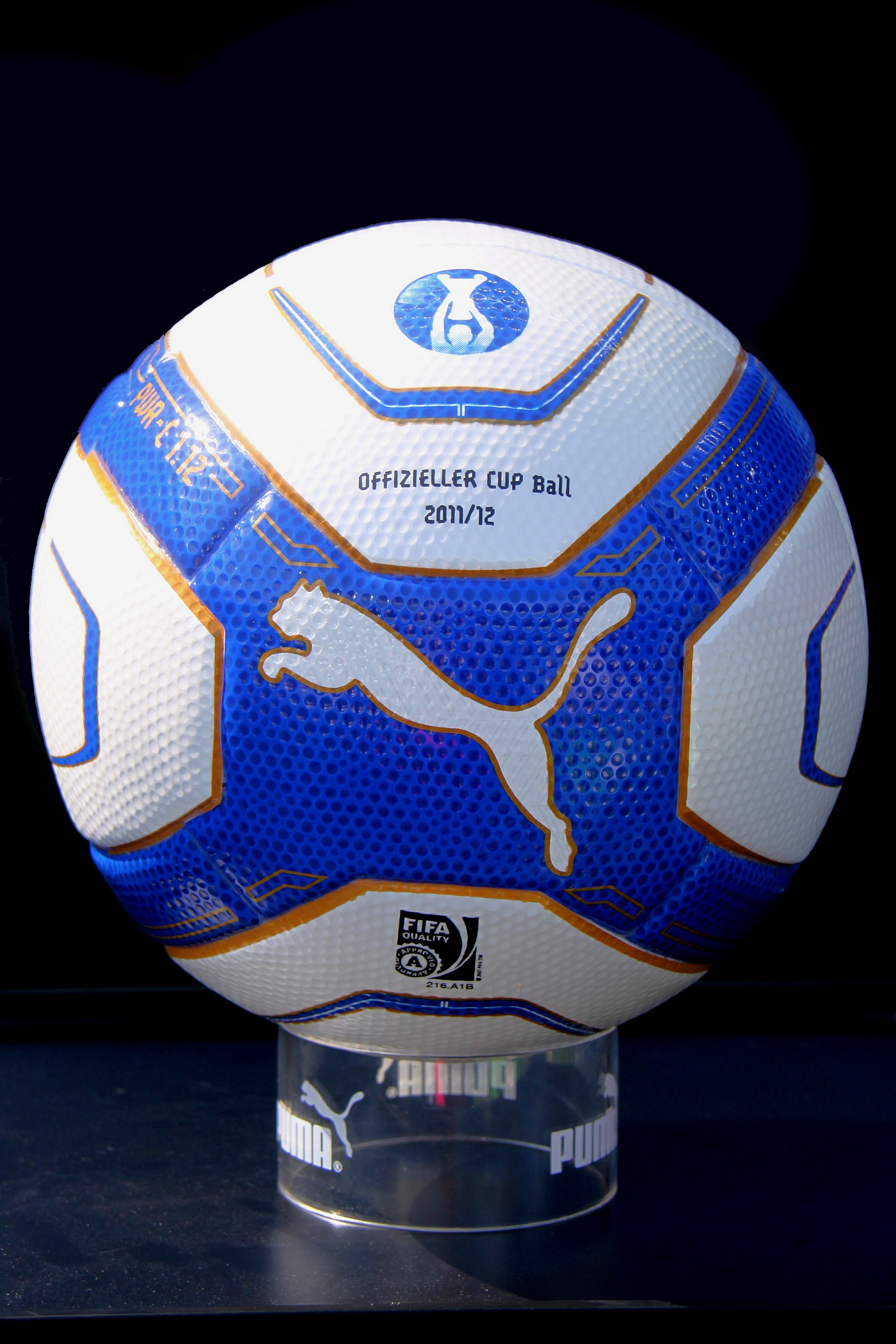
Puma football ball

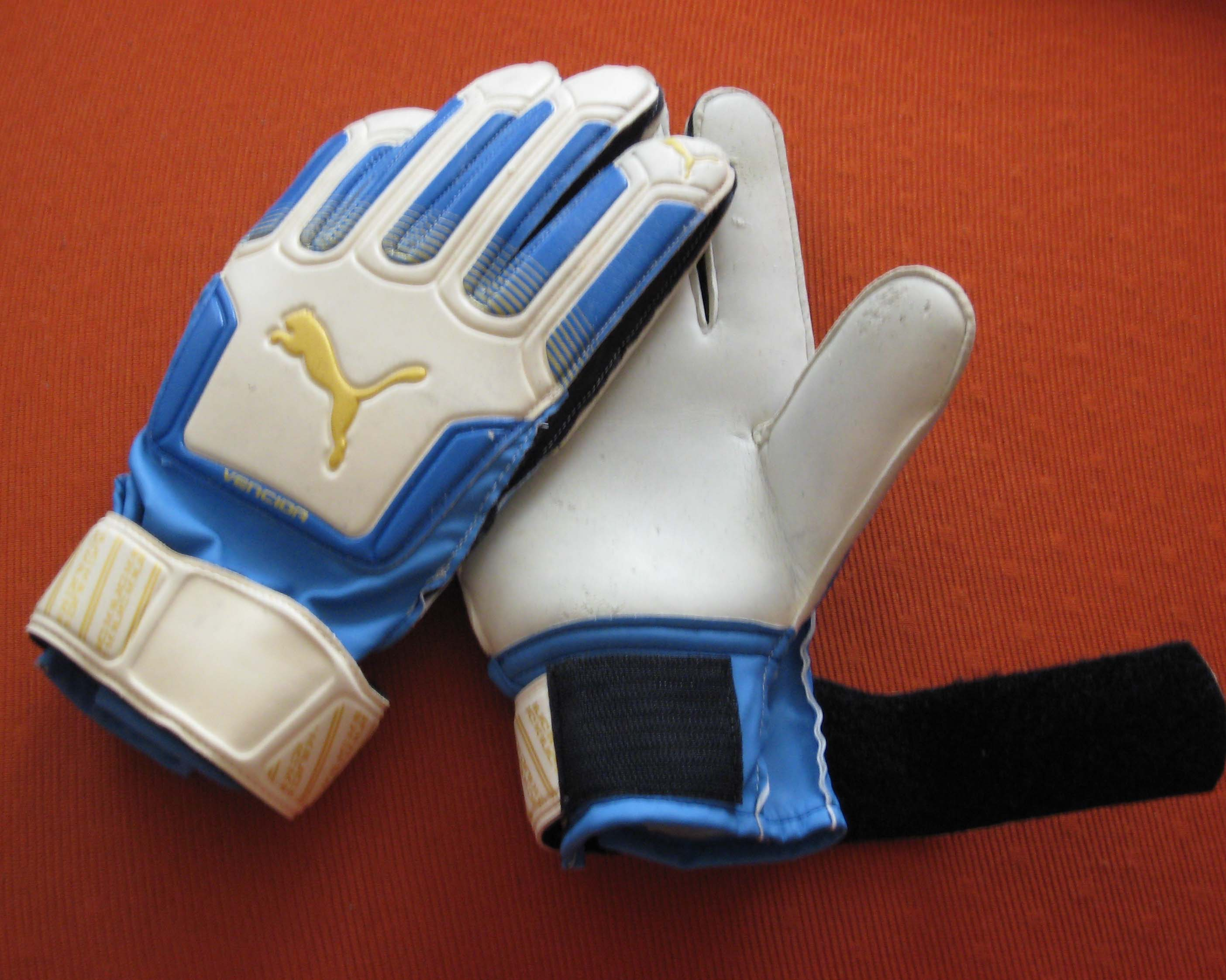
Puma goalkeeper gloves

Puma holds a 5% stake in German football club Borussia Dortmund, and has been its supplier since 2012. In 2014, Puma and Arsenal Football Club entered a 5-year merchandising partnership, the biggest deal in Puma and Arsenal's history. The partnership ended in 2019.

Football clubs include AC Milan, Manchester City F.C., Southampton F.C., Parma Calcio 1913, Palermo FC, PSV Eindhoven, Valencia CF, Girona FC, Borussia Mönchengladbach, RB Leipzig, Olympique de Marseille, Cercle Brugge K.S.V., Sociedade Esportiva Palmeiras, Fluminense Football Club and Galatasaray S.K.

Other clubs include Derby County, Bodø/Glimt, FC Red Bull Salzburg, FC Shakhtar Donetsk, Barrow A.F.C., Peñarol, Club Cerro Porteño, Maccabi Tel Aviv F.C., Club Bolívar, Club Atlético Independiente, Club de Fútbol Monterrey, Chivas de Guadalajara, Bengaluru FC, Mumbai City FC, Universidad Católica, Universitatea Craiova, Kawasaki Frontale, Yokohama FC, Shimizu S-Pulse, Kyoto Sanga FC and many others.

National football teams include Portugal, Austria, Switzerland, Czech Republic, Iceland, Paraguay, New Zealand, Senegal, Ghana, Ivory Coast, Morocco, Egypt, Bahrain, Philippines, Malaysia and Brunei.

Puma footballs are the official ball of top-level leagues in Spain, Italy, Portugal, Scotland, as well as the English Football League. Beginning in the 2025–26 season, Puma will provide the match ball for England's Premier League in a deal which will also see PGMOL referees in England's top four divisions wear Puma kits.

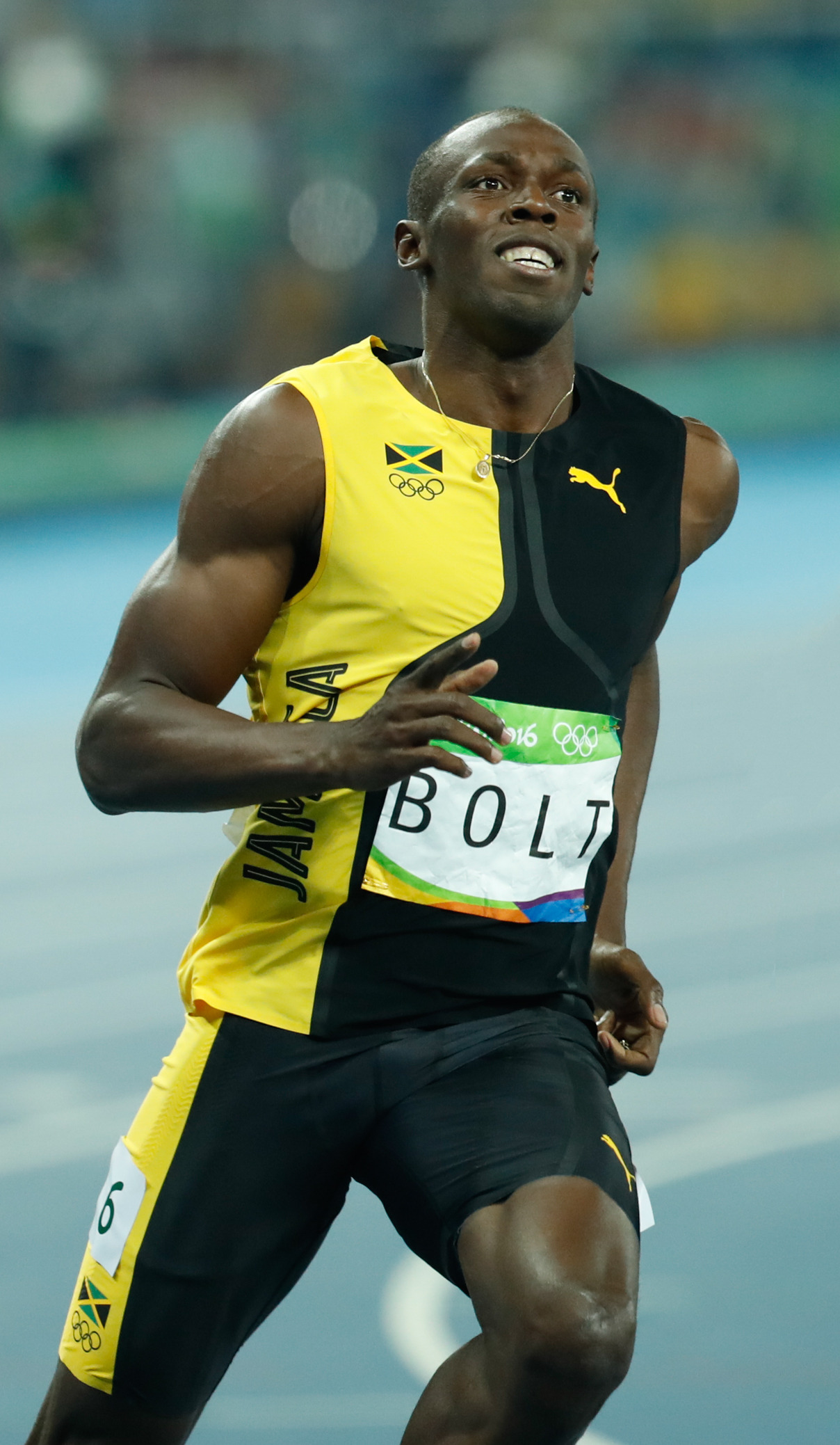
Usain Bolt in his Puma track uniform

In athletics (track and field), as of February 2025, Puma sponsors the Bahamas Olympic Committee, Jamaica Olympic Committee, Trinidad and Tobago Olympic Committee, Bahamas Athletics Association, Cuba Athletics Federation, Jamaica Athletics Association, Portugal Athletics Federation, and Switzerland Athletics Federation. They sponsor athletes Karsten Warholm, Shericka Jackson, Mondo Duplantis, Yaroslava Mahuchikh, Felix Streng, Julien Alfred, Marcell Jacobs, Konstanze Klosterhalfen, Andre De Grasse, and Elaine Thompson-Herah. Several world records were achieved by athletes wearing Puma shoes, such as Heinz Fütterer (1954), Armin Hary (1960), Jim Hines (1968), Tommie Smith (1968), Asafa Powell (2015), and Usain Bolt (2002-2024).

In 2018, Puma announced its entrance back into basketball after a break of almost 20 years, and appointed Jay-Z as the division's creative director. Marvin Bagley III, Deandre Ayton, Zhaire Smith, and Michael Porter Jr. are the first players to join Puma's basketball roster and play in performance Puma basketball shoes. In December 2021, the brand launched High Court, its first women's basketball line, designed by creative director June Ambrose.

Puma made its partnership with netball after 28 years by sponsoring the Melbourne Vixens in 2018, and became the official apparel sponsor of New Zealand's national netball team, the Silver Ferns. Golfers such as Rickie Fowler and Lexi Thompson are equipped by Puma's golf brand Cobra Golf. Puma has also sponsored cricketers such as Virat Kohli, Ryan Burl, Heino Kuhn and Rashid Khan.

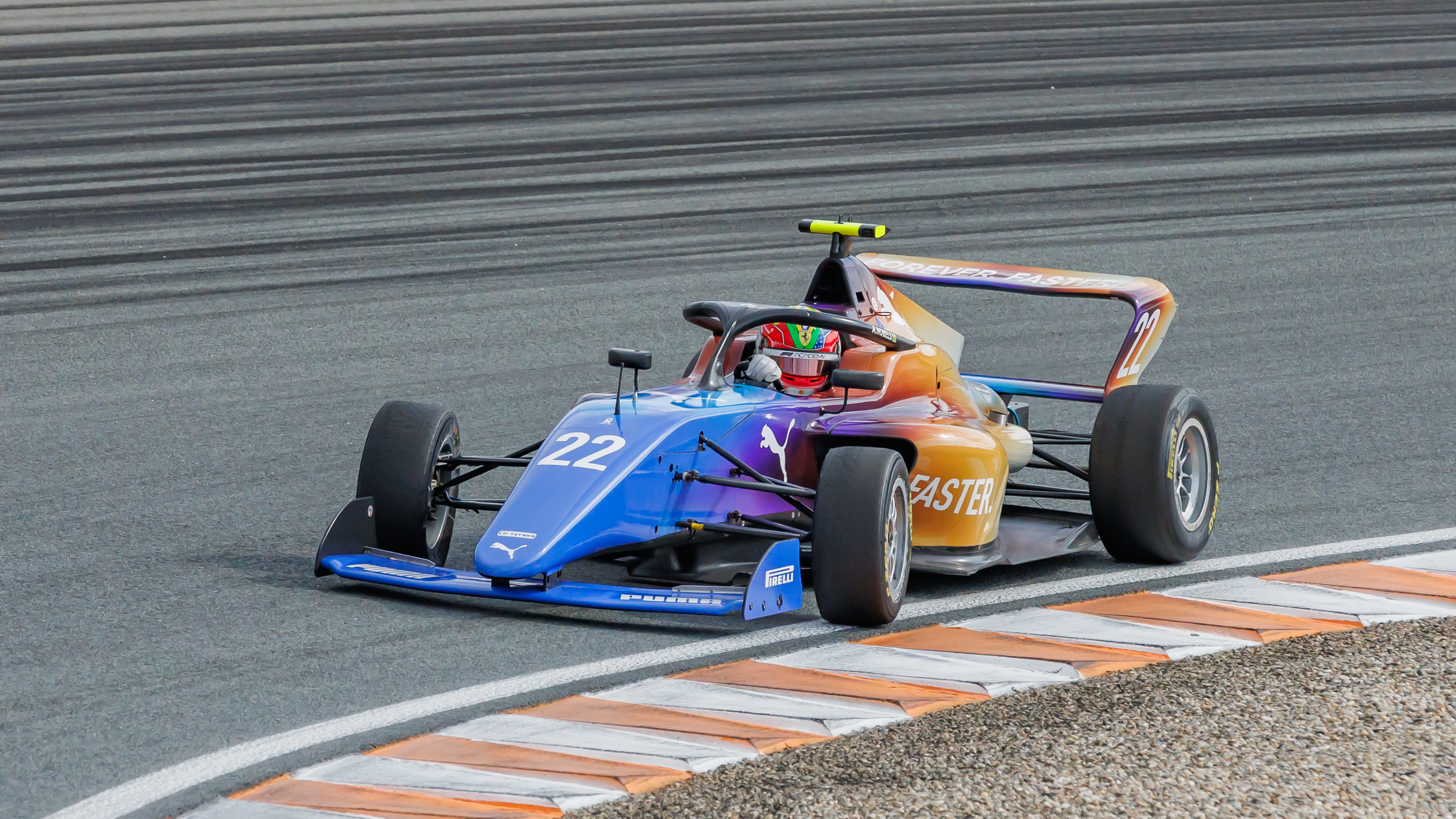
Aurelia Nobels driving Puma's F1 Academy car

Puma is the main producer of enthusiast driving shoes and race suits and entered a partnership with BMW, Ducati and Ferrari to make their respective shoes. In Formula 1, Puma equips Scuderia Ferrari, Aston Martin, and McLaren. In 2024, Puma became the official Formula 1 trackside vendor and personnel supplier, and also became an official partner of F1 Academy. The company sponsors BMW, Mercedes (until 2024) and Porsche in all of their motorsports activities. In NASCAR, Puma equips Team Penske with fire suits, gloves, and shoes until 2023. They also sponsor NY Racing Team.

With the announcement of their partnership with Magnus Carlsen in 2022, Puma expanded its presence into competitive chess. In 2023, the collaboration with Carlsen also produced the chess inspired Puma Clyde Chess sneaker.

Rihanna was named creative director of Puma's womenswear line in December 2014. Two years later, Puma partnered with The Weeknd as a creative collaborator. In 2018, Puma launched its venture with its ambassador Selena Gomez called "Phenom Lux" In 2019, Big Sean became Puma's brand ambassador. Puma has also partnered with LaMelo Ball, NBA athlete, in 2020 to create a line including sports, culture, music and fashion.

In 2024, Puma appointed Milind Soman as its running ambassador. The same year, Sekou became the brand's ambassador. Later in June, Rosé becomes Puma's brand ambassador.

On October 8, 2024, Puma announced a partnership with Tyrese Haliburton to make him the face of its basketball division. On June 5, 2025, prior to Game 1 of the NBA Finals, the brand announced Haliburton's first signature shoe, the Puma Hali 1, designed by Salehe Bembury. That night, while wearing his shoe for the first time, Haliburton hit a game winning shot with 0.3 seconds left to give the Indiana Pacers a 1-0 series lead. The first colorway of the Hali 1 was released globally on September 26, 2025.

In September 2024, Puma and A$AP Rocky dropped a collection of footwear, apparel and accessories, featuring the Mostro 3.D which debuted at New York Fashion Week. Rocky also debuted the Inhale Sneaker which was re-engineered with an allover distressed treatment.

== Labour practices and factory conditions ==
In 2000, Puma began auditing all of its suppliers on a yearly basis, and makes the results available in its sustainability reports. Since 2005, it has publicly provided a list of its suppliers.

In August 2004, a joint report from the National Labor Committee and China Labor Watch stated that workers at some of Puma's Chinese factories were enduring sweatshop conditions, working up to 16.5 hours per day for about US$0.31 an hour. Puma said it would investigate the claims.

In February 2012, a woman who worked for one of Puma's suppliers in Cambodia was shot during a protest over factory working conditions. Puma acknowledged the poor working conditions and said it would work to improve the situation.

According to a joint report from Labour Behind the Label and Community Legal Education Centre, 30 workers fainted in November 2012 while producing clothing for Puma in China. The faintings were caused by excessive heat and alleged forced overtime. In 2014, almost 120 workers fainted in two Cambodian clothing factories where sportswear was being produced for Puma and Adidas, due to temperatures above 100 degrees Fahrenheit (38 °C). In March 2017, 150 workers assembling Puma products in Cambodia fainted due to thick smoke.

Puma has obtained the Ethical Clothing Australia accreditation for its Australian-made products. This labour-friendly accreditation applies to only a small percentage of Puma's total production.

Since 2018, the Boycott, Divestment and Sanctions (BDS) movement has called for a boycott of Puma over its sponsorship of the Israel Football Association and demanded that the company "end complicity with the Israeli colonial and apartheid regime." The BDS campaign also stated that Puma contracted with an Israeli distributor operating in illegal Israeli settlements in the West Bank. Puma ended its sponsorship of the Israel national football team in 2024.

In 2020, the Australian Strategic Policy Institute accused at least 82 major brands, including Puma, of being connected to forced Uyghur labor in Xinjiang. In 2022, researchers from Nordhausen University of Applied Sciences identified cotton from Xinjiang in Puma shirts.

Research funded by the Progressive Alliance of Socialists and Democrats of the European Parliament and the Freedom Fund, conducted by Uyghur Rights Monitor, Sheffield Hallam University, and the Uyghur Center for Democracy and Human Rights, showed in December 2023 that Puma is supplied by Gain Lucky, an international intermediary of Anhui Huamao, a textile manufacturer that has a history of using forced labour by Uyghurs.

== See also ==
- Sabel v Puma, a CJEU case on trade marks
