= Arena (swimwear) =

Swimwear company

Arena S.p.A.
- Company type: S.p.A.
- Industry: Textile
- Founded: 1973; 53 years ago
- Founder: Horst Dassler
- Headquarters: Tolentino, Italy
- Area served: Worldwide
- Products: Swimwear
- Owner: Descente Ltd.
- Website: arenasport.com

Arena S.p.A. is an Italian manufacturing company of competitive swimwear created in 1973 by Horst Dassler. The company is currently headquartered in Tolentino, Italy. In 1990, Arena was sold by Adidas to Japanese corporation Descente Ltd., which still commercialises its products.

It has subsidiaries in France, Germany, and the United States, and also operates through a global network of distributors and licensees, with presence in over 100 countries around the world.

== History ==
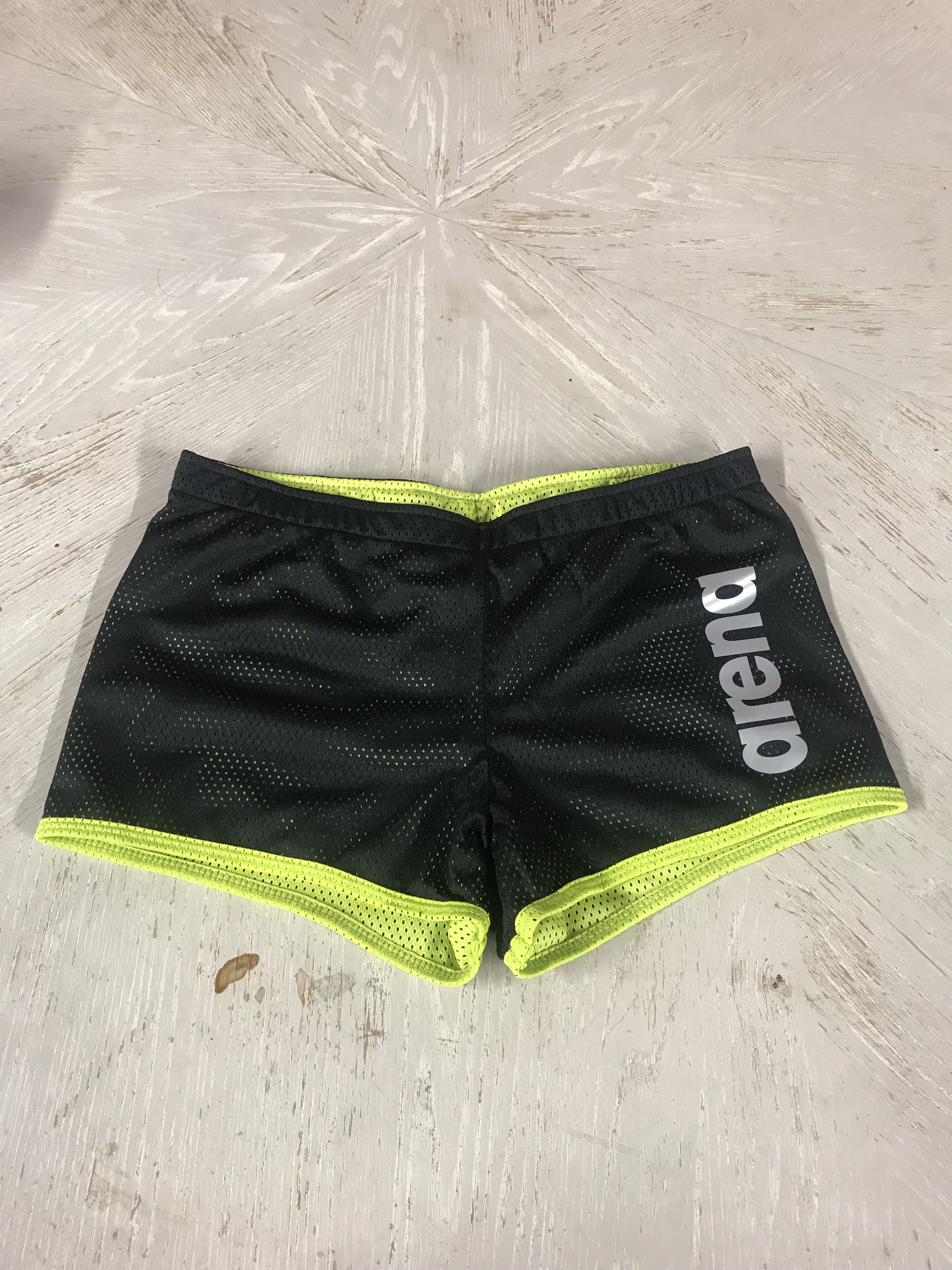
A drag suit designed by Arena.

Arena was created in 1973 by Horst Dassler, son of Adidas founder Adolf Dassler, in order to manufacture competitive swimwear. The idea of producing sportswear came up to Dassler after the astounding performance of swimmer Mark Spitz at the 1972 Summer Olympics in Munich, where he won seven gold medals.

In 1973 the brand launched its first swimwear line, the "Skinfit", made of an ultra-light fabric only weighed 18 grams. One year later, Arena signed its first sponsorship agreement with Australian swimmer Shane Gould, who had won 5 Olympic medals at Munich. Arena released a swimsuit collection with her name.

Having realised that sponsorship was a key to his brand's success, Arena signed other individual athletes for the 1976 Summer Olympics in Montreal. Some athletes sponsored were Mark Spitz, Novella Calligaris, Steve Furniss, David Wilkie, Shirley Babashoff, Gary Hall, Klaus Dibiasi, and Ulrika Knape, among others.

During the 1980s, Arena introduced the "Flyback" suit, designed to thin straps to create larger shoulder openings. Other swimsuits launched were the "AquaRacer" (1990) and the "X-Flat" (1997), while the brand continued to recruit new talents to add to its list of sponsorships. Some of the athletes signed were Alexander Popov and Franziska van Almsick.

In 2019, Arena bought the global brand rights to Italian swimswear brand, Diana.
