= Rudolf Dassler =

German cobbler, businessman (1898–1974)

Rudolf "Rudi" Dassler
- Born: 26 March 1898; Herzogenaurach, Bavaria, German Empire
- Died: 27 October 1974 (aged 76); Herzogenaurach, West Germany
- Occupation: Founder of Puma
- Spouse: Friedl Dassler (née Strasser)
- Children: Armin Dassler
- Relatives: Fritz Dassler (brother); Marie (sister); Adolf Dassler (brother); Horst Dassler (nephew)

Rudolf "Rudi" Dassler (26 March 1898 – 27 October 1974) was a German cobbler, inventor and businessman who founded the sportswear company Puma.

Born on 26 March 1898 in Herzogenaurach, Rudolf was the older brother of Adidas founder Adolf "Adi" Dassler. The brothers were partners in a shoe company Adolf started, Gebrüder Dassler Schuhfabrik ("Dassler Brothers Shoe Factory"). Rudolf joined in 1924. However, after a feud developed between them following World War II, the brothers went separate ways and started their respective companies in 1948.

Initially calling the new company "Ruda" (a portmanteau for Rudolf Dassler), it was soon changed to its present name of Puma. Puma is the Quechua word for cougar; from there, it went into German as well as other languages.

== Life ==
After his return from World War I, Adolf Dassler, Rudolf's younger brother, started to produce sports shoes in his mother's kitchen. His father, Christoph, who worked in a shoe factory, and the brothers Zehlein, who produced the handmade spikes for track shoes in their blacksmith's shop, supported Adolf in starting his own business. On 1 July 1924, Rudolf joined the business and it formed the "Gebrüder Dassler, Sportschuhfabrik, Herzogenaurach" (Dassler Brothers Sports Shoe Factory), Herzogenaurach.

With the rise of Adolf Hitler in the 1930s, both Dassler brothers joined the Nazi Party, with Rudolf reputed as being the more ardent Nazi.

Under his direction, Puma remained a small provincial company. Only under the direction of his son, Armin Dassler, did it become the worldwide known company it remains today.

== Death ==
Rudi Dassler died on 27 October 1974 of lung cancer at the age of 76.

== See also ==
- Dassler brothers feud
- German inventors and discoverers
