= Salehe Bembury =

American footwear designer (born 1986)

- Born: 1986 (age 39–40); New York City, US
- Education: Syracuse University
- Occupation: Footwear designer
- Website: salehebembury.com

Salehe Bembury (born c. 1986) is an American footwear designer known for his luxurious streetwear-style. He is vice president of sneakers and men's footwear at Versace. Bembury previously designed at Yeezy and Cole Haan.

== Early life and education ==
Bembury was born c. 1986 and raised in Tribeca, New York. He attended the Calhoun School in Manhattan. He completed an industrial design degree at Syracuse University.

== Career ==
After graduation, Bembury designed shoes at Payless. In 2011, he was hired at Cole Haan where he served on the innovation team and created the LunarGrand silhouette. His supervisor at Cole Haan worked for Kanye West and encouraged Bembury to submit his portfolio. Starting at Yeezy in 2015, he designed luxury streetwear-style sneakers in the brand's season 3 and 4 projects. In September 2017, Bembury got his position as head of sneaker design at Versace by direct messaging his future supervisor via LinkedIn. In 2020, Bembury became vice president of sneakers and men's footwear at Versace. He also designs independently.

== Personal life ==
As of December 2018, Bembury resided in an apartment in Silver Lake, Los Angeles.

On October 1, 2020, Bembury was stopped and frisked by an officer of the Beverly Hills Police Department after jaywalking. Bembury posted a video of a portion of the encounter to his Instagram account, where he accused the officer of racial profiling and drew connections to shopping while black. The following day, the Beverly Hills Police Department released the full body cam footage of the incident in which Bembury admits to jaywalking and consents to the officer's requests to identify Bembury and search him for weapons. The encounter lasted approximately 3½ minutes and Bembury was not issued a citation.
