= Puma Suede =

Athletic shoe by Puma

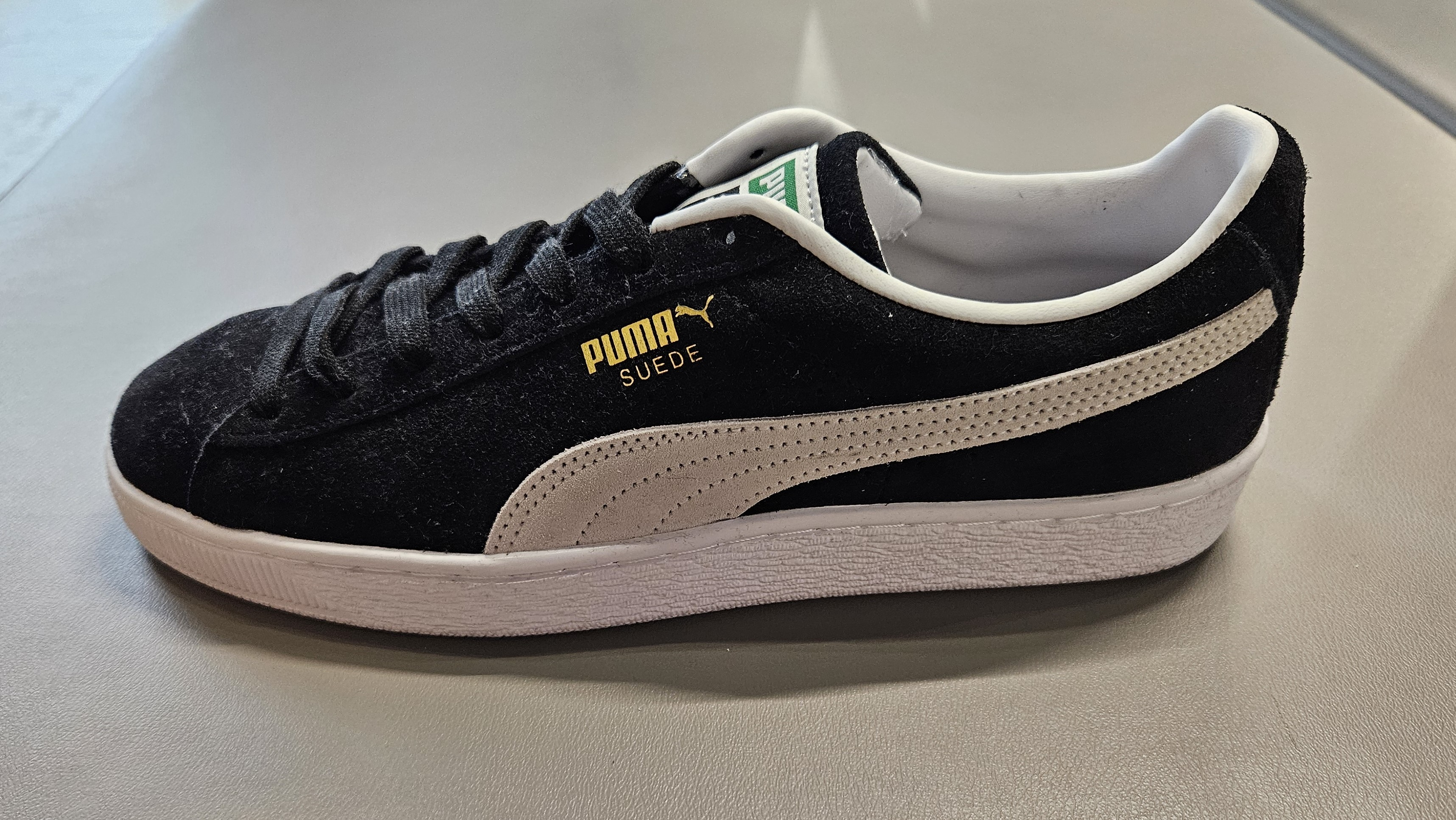
- Type: Sneakers
- Inventor: Puma
- Inception: 1968; 58 years ago
- Manufacturer: Puma
- Available: Yes
- Website: about.puma.com

Puma Suede is a line of shoes produced by Puma, with the first model released in 1968. The shoe is notable for being the first sneakers to use suede which at the time of its release was still considered a luxury material.

== Overview ==
The idea of the Puma Suede came from the fact that the majority of sneakers at the time were all made of canvas and all mainly looked the same with no real originality. It also wouldn't be until 1969 that the Adidas Superstar, the first sneaker made out of leather, would be released. Puma decided to create a shoe to change the idea of what a sneaker would look like. The sneaker was designed by Heiko Desens and was released as an alternative to the "Puma Basket".

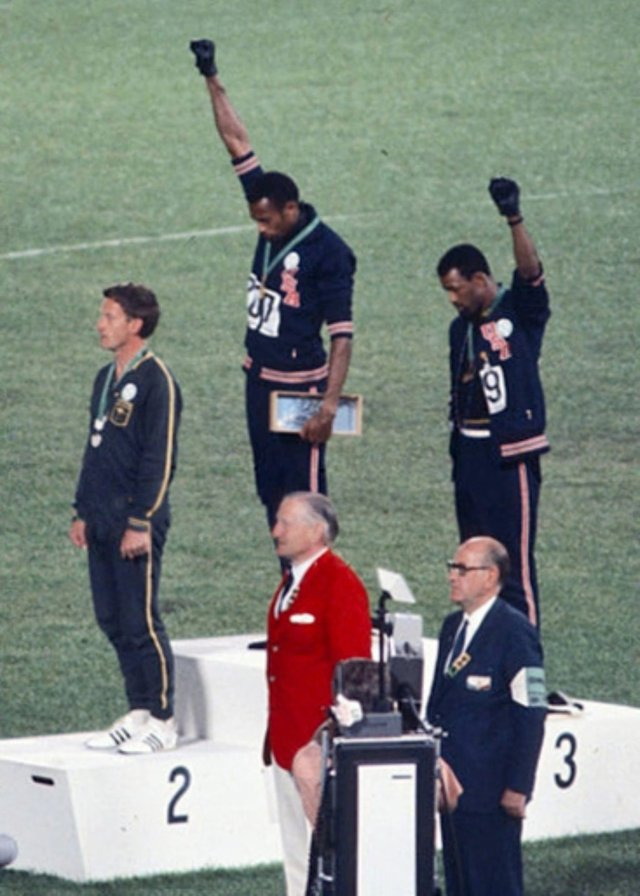
Tommie Smith (center) and John Carlos (right) showing the raised fist on the podium at the 1968 Summer Olympics.

The same year of its release, the sneaker gained notoriety after U.S. Olympian Tommie Smith decided to take off his shoes and put them on the podium and raise his fist alongside John Carlos to protest racism and injustice against African Americans in the United States.

The 1980s saw the shoe become popular with the rise of breakdancing and see many b-boy groups wear the shoes thanks to its built quality making it easy to dance in that style.

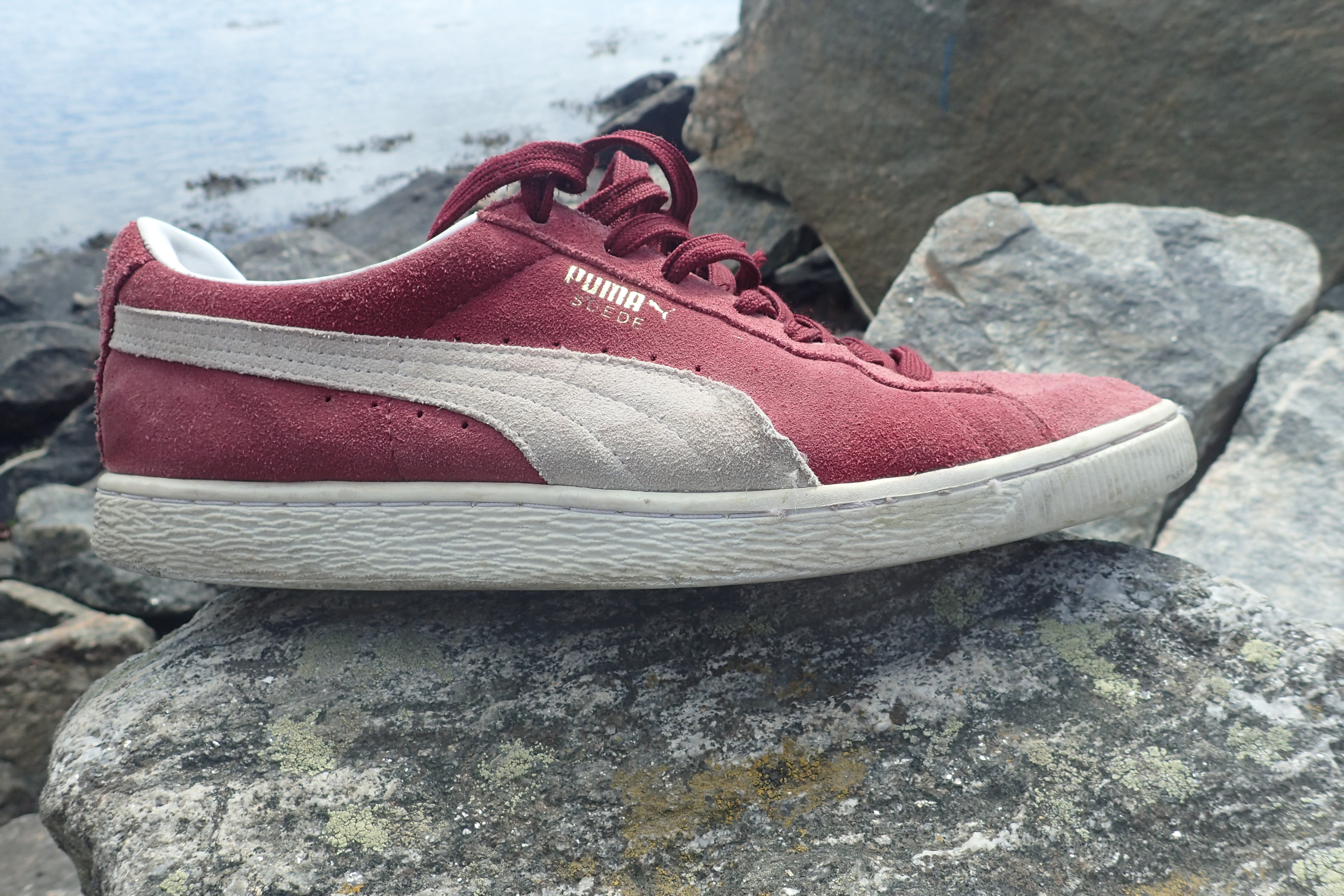
An old red pair of Puma Suede shoes

Today, the shoe is still worn by many celebrities and athletes and continues to play a prominent role in modern fashion.

== Models ==
=== Suede Classic ===
The original release of the model in the same design and build materials.

=== Suede XL ===
A version released in February 2024 that features a bigger bottom sole and fatter upper. It is inspired by skateboard shoes of the late 90s and early 2000s. It features more cushioning around the shoe and tongue with extra padding.
