= Herzogenaurach =

- Town
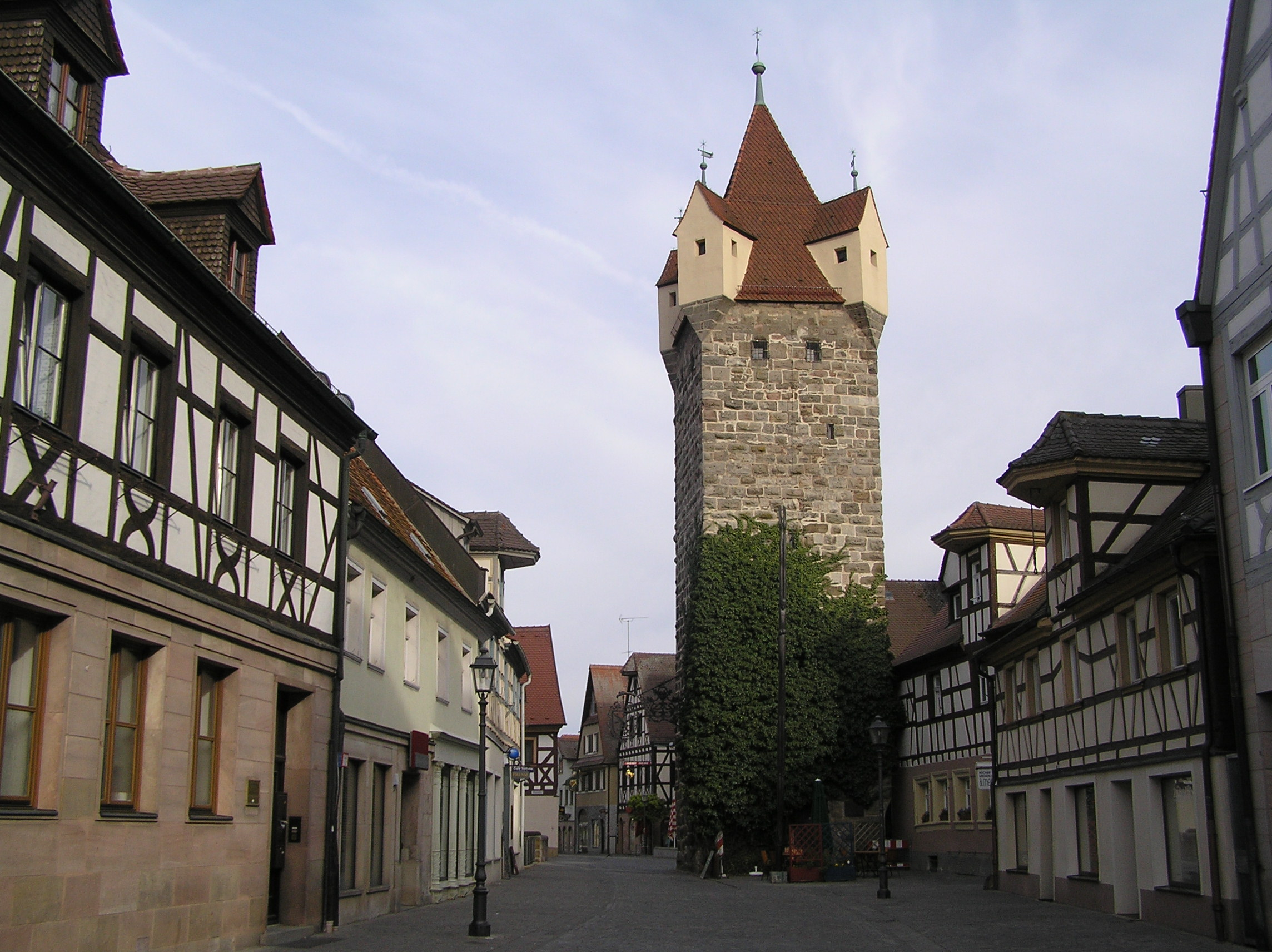
- Old town of Herzogenaurach

- Coat of arms

- Location of Herzogenaurach within Erlangen-Höchstadt district
- Interactive map of Herzogenaurach
- Location within Germany Location within Bavaria
- Coordinates: 49°34′12″N 10°52′55″E
- Country: Germany
- State: Bavaria
- Admin. region: Mittelfranken
- District: Erlangen-Höchstadt
- Subdivisions: 12 districts

Government
  - Mayor (2020–26): German Hacker (SPD)

Area
  - Total: 47.62 km^{2} (18.39 sq mi)
- Elevation: 301 m (988 ft)

Population (2025-12-31)
  - Total: 24,312
  - Density: 510.5/km^{2} (1,322/sq mi)
- Time zone: UTC+01:00 (CET)
  - Summer (DST): UTC+02:00 (CEST)
- Postal codes: 91074
- Dialling codes: 09132
- Vehicle registration: ERH
- Website: www.herzogenaurach.de

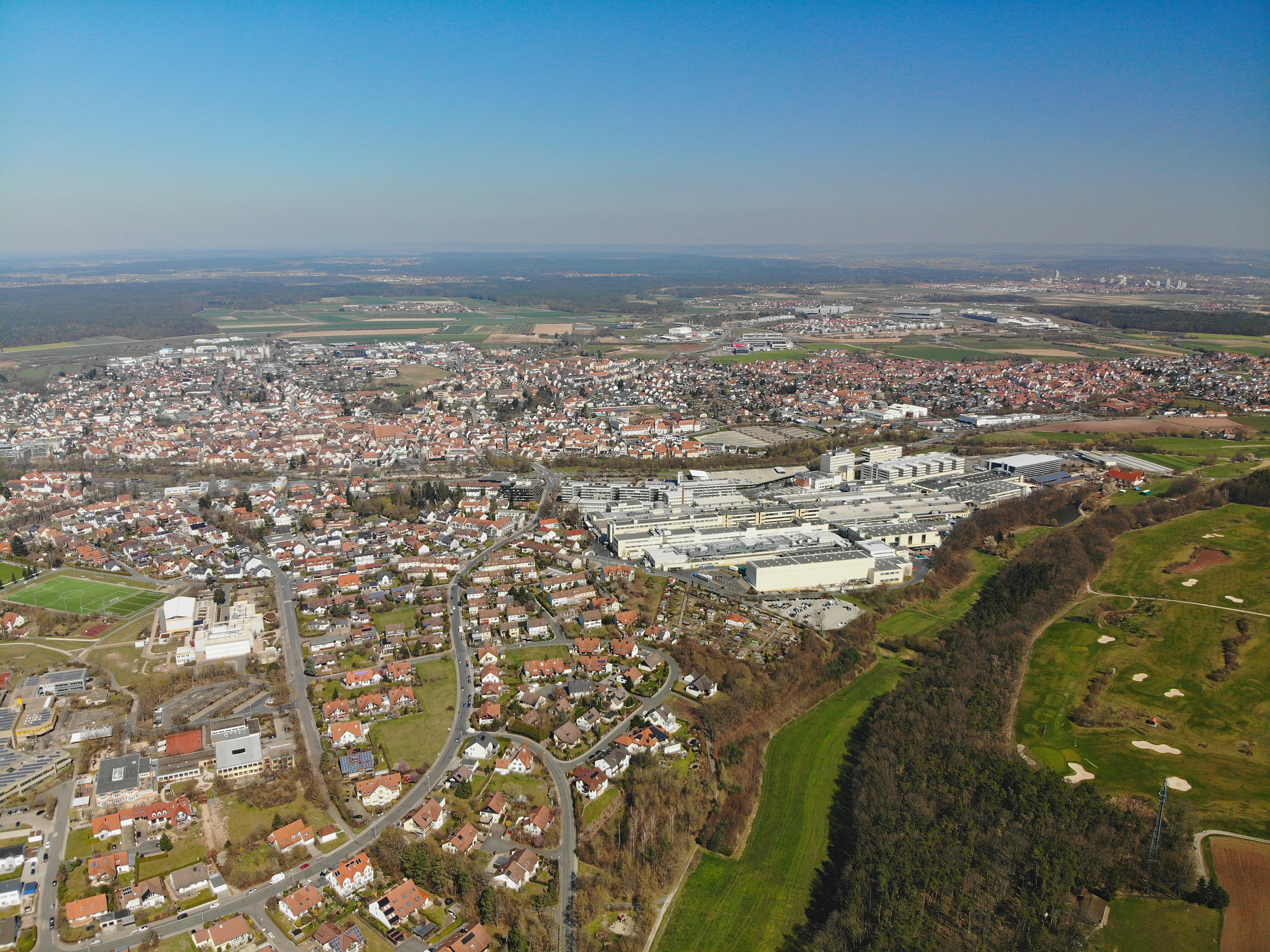
Aerial view of Herzogenaurach in 2020

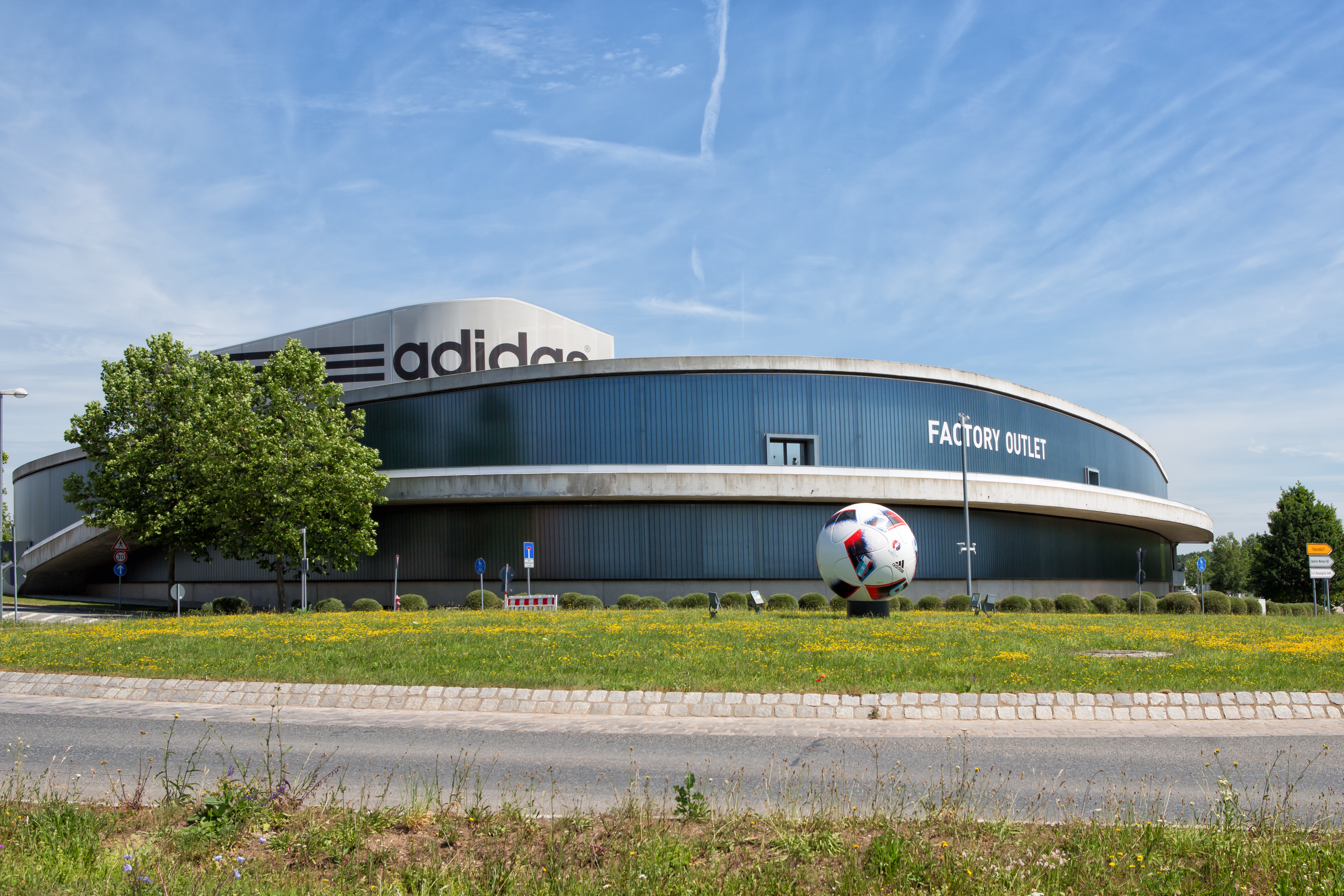
The Adidas factory outlet in Herzogenaurach

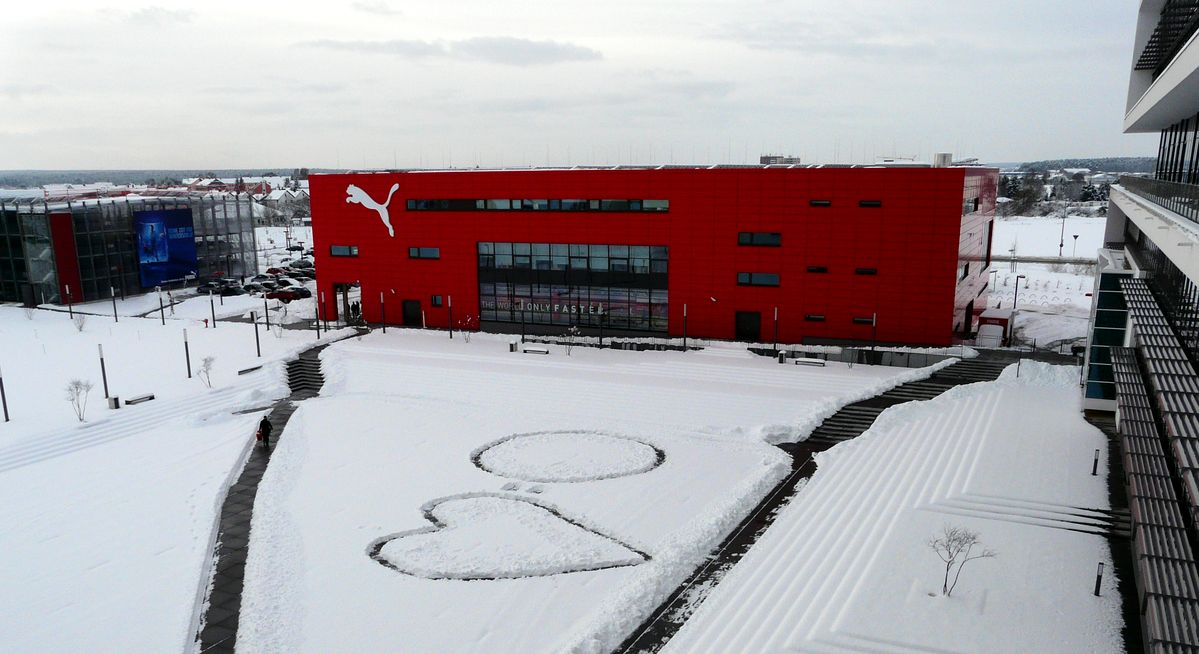
PUMAVision, the headquarters of Puma in Herzogenaurach

Herzogenaurach (German pronunciation: [hɛʁtsoːɡn̩ˈʔaʊʁax]; Mainfränkisch: Herziaura) is a town in the district of Erlangen-Höchstadt, in Bavaria, Germany. The name is a compound of "Herzog" meaning duke and the Aurach River that flows through the town. It is home to two major international sporting goods companies, Adidas and Puma, and the Schaeffler Group, a car parts manufacturer.

== Geography ==
Herzogenaurach is situated in the Middle Franconia area of Bavaria, 23 km (14 mi) northwest of Nuremberg. The town is located on the Aurach River, a tributary of the Regnitz River.

== History ==
Herzogenaurach was first mentioned in a document from 1002 under the name of Uraha when Holy Roman Emperor Henry II granted the town to the Prince-Bishopric of Bamberg.

== Economy ==
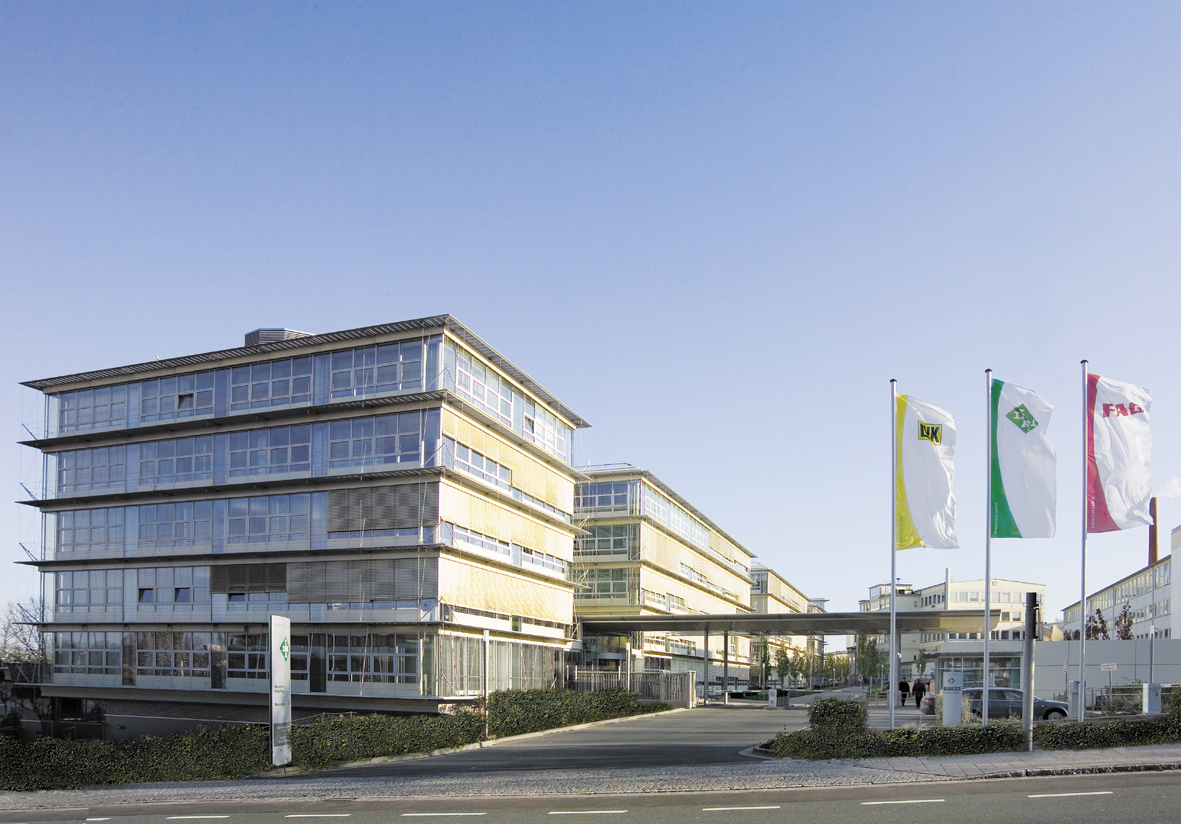
The corporate headquarters of Schaeffler Group in Herzogenaurach

Herzogenaurach has gained global fame as the birthplace of two giant sporting goods companies: Adidas and Puma, each founded respectively by brothers Adolf Dassler and Rudolf Dassler, after an acrimonious familial split in 1948. Operating since the 1960s, both companies' headquarters are still located in the town, originally on opposite sides of the Aurach River, and brand loyalty was sharply divided as well. For many years, Adidas and Puma workers would not associate with each other, and even when Adolf and Rudi died, they were buried in opposite ends of the town's cemetery. These differences have cleared up over the years.

The headquarters of Schaeffler Group, a manufacturer of car parts, is also located in Herzogenaurach.

== Sport ==
The town's two football clubs were divided by the Adidas/Puma split. ASV Herzogenaurach was supported by Adidas, while FC Herzogenaurach endorsed Puma's footwear. Both clubs still play at the amateur level.

The Argentina national football team was based in Herzogenaurach for the 2006 FIFA World Cup.

Néstor De la Torre, Mexico's Director of National Teams, said the Mexico national football team would gather for 12 days in the city, its last stop before heading to South Africa for the 2010 World Cup.

The German national football team stayed at the Adidas Home Ground, both in preparation for the European Championship in 2021 and during the European Championship in 2024.

== Herzo Base ==
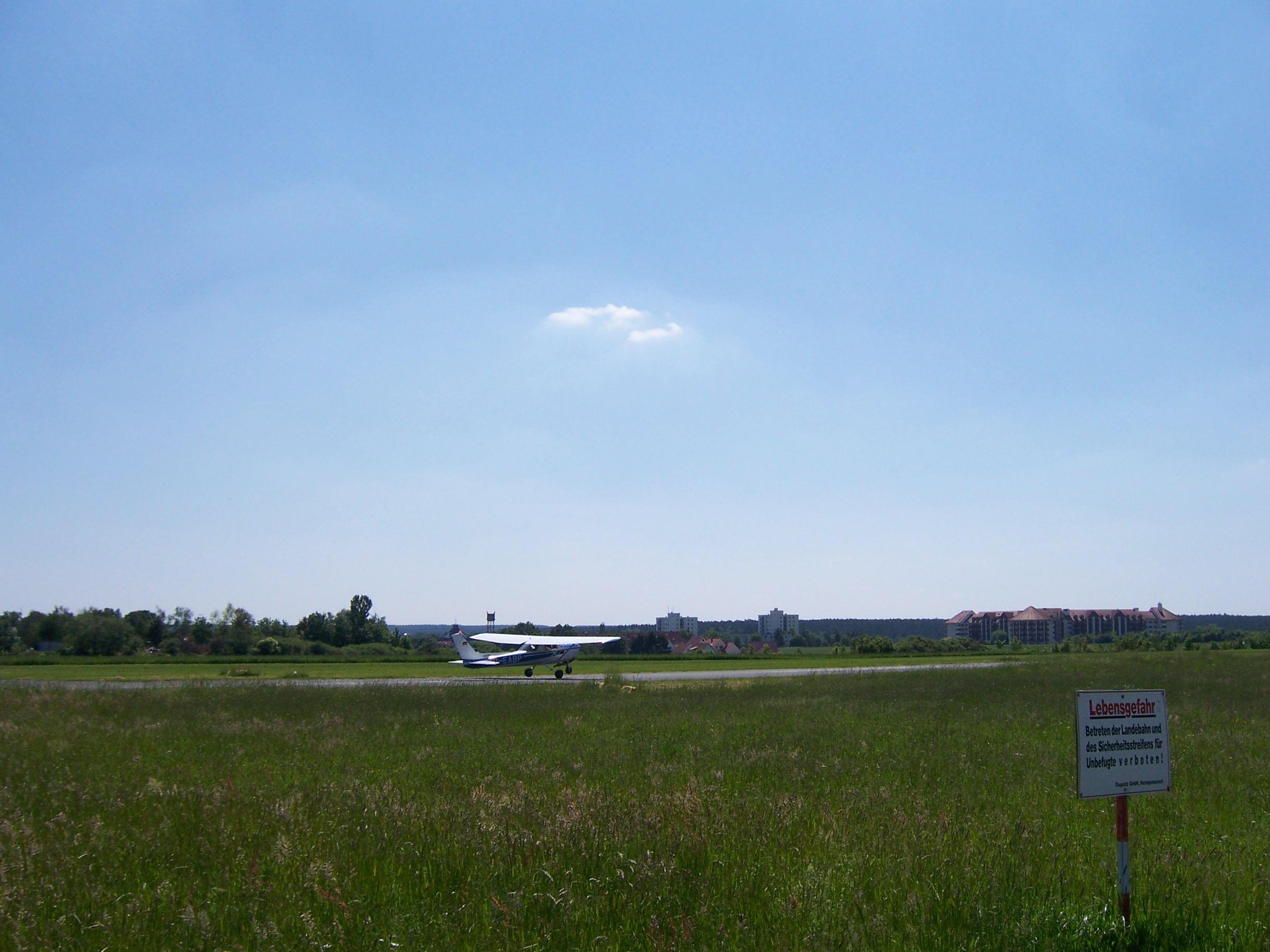
Herzogenaurach Airfield

Herzogenaurach was the location of a military airfield beginning in the 1930s. The airfield was originally designed as an airfield by a French architect and constructed by the Deutsche Luftwaffe (Air Force), named Deutsche Fliegerschule (German pilot school). Initially, the post was limited in its use as a Hitler youth training school due to limitations imposed by the Versailles Treaty after World War I.

However, fighter pilots soon began training in civilian clothing. In March 1936, the Luftwaffe took official control. The airfield was mainly used as a fuelling point for aircraft providing air cover for troops during the invasion of Austria and Czechoslovakia. In early September of each year, planes took off from the airfield to fly over the annual Nazi party rally (Reichsparteitag) staged at Zeppelinwiese (Zeppelin Field) in Nuremberg.

During the Western Allied invasion of Germany in April 1945, the United States Third Army seized the airfield. It was designated as ALG R-29. It was first occupied by a transportation unit followed by the USAAF 354th Fighter Group in May. In May 1946, the 2nd Radio Corps took over the installation and renamed it "Herzo Base". In 1947 the base was occupied by the U.S. Army Security Agency up until 1971, when it was replaced by the 210th Field Artillery Group (re-designated as the 210th Field Artillery Brigade on 16 September 1980) which occupied Herzo Base until 1992. Herzo Base was included in the base closure plan. On 4 August 1992, the installation was officially returned to the German Government. It has since served as a civilian recreational airfield, with ICAO code EDQH.

== International relations ==
Herzogenaurach is twinned with:

- Wolfsberg, Austria, since 1968
- Kaya, Burkina Faso, since 1972
- Nova Gradiška, Croatia, since 1980
- Sainte-Luce-sur-Loire, France, since 1988
- Peacehaven, United Kingdom, since 2007
