= Adidas =

German multinational clothing and apparel corporation

Adidas AG
- Main logo since 2022

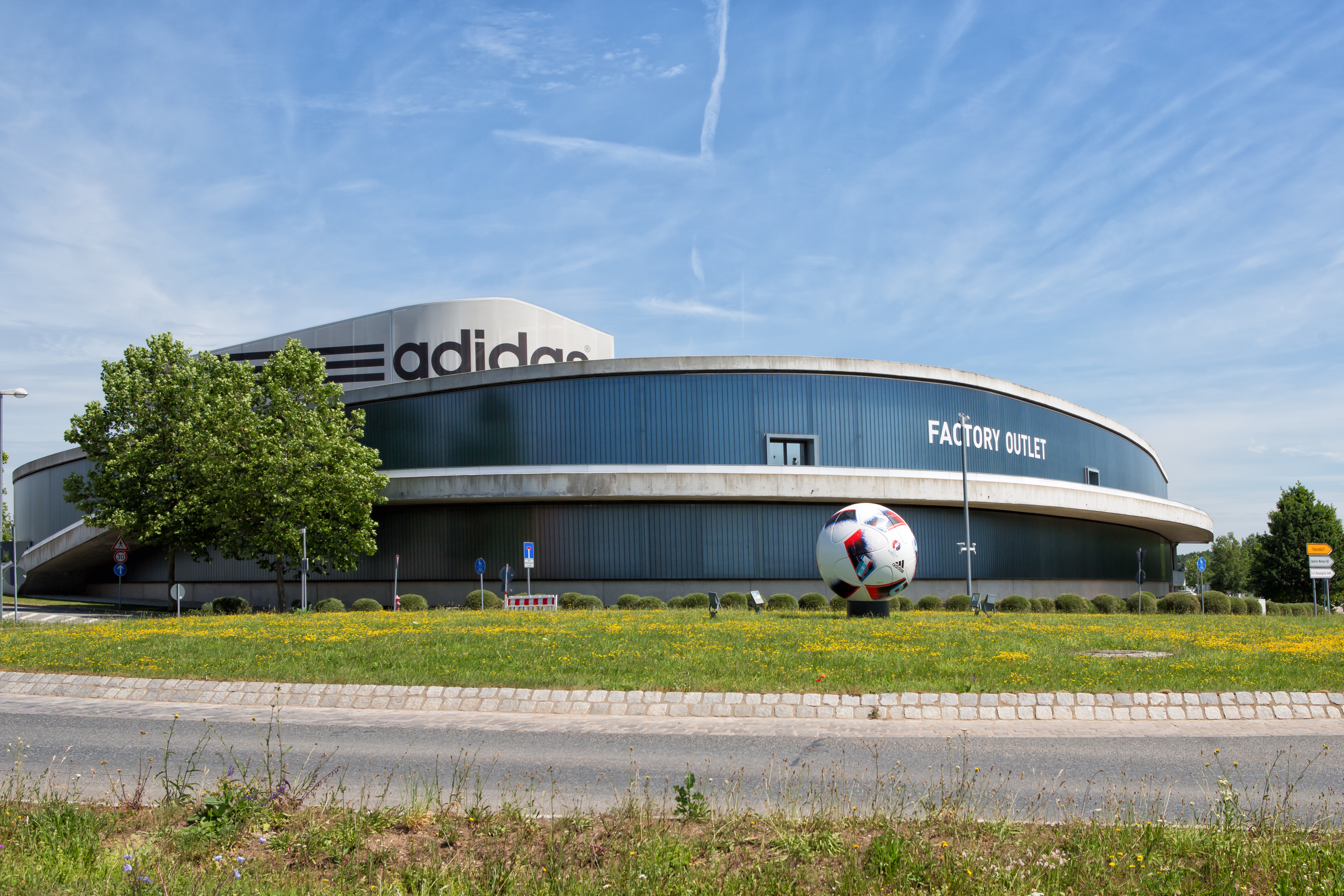
- Current factory outlet in Herzogenaurach, Germany
- Formerly: Gebrüder Dassler Schuhfabrik (1924–1949)
- Type: Public
- Traded as: FWB: ADS; DAX component
- Industry: Textile, footwear
- Founded: July 1924; 102 years ago in Herzogenaurach, Germany (as Gebrüder Dassler Schuhfabrik); 18 August 1949; 77 years ago (as Adidas)
- Founder: Adolf Dassler
- Headquarters: Herzogenaurach, Bavaria, Germany
- Area served: Worldwide
- Key people: Nassef Sawiris (chairman); Bjørn Gulden (CEO)
- Products: Apparel, footwear, sportswear, sports equipment, toiletries
- Revenue: ▲€23.683 billion (2024)
- Operating income: ▲€1.249 billion (2024)
- Net income: ▲€756 million (2024)
- Total assets: ▲€20.655 billion (2024)
- Total equity: ▲€5.868 billion (2024)
- Number of employees: 62,035 (2024)
- Subsidiaries: Adidas Runtastic; Matix
- Website: adidas.com

Adidas AG (German pronunciation: [ˈadiˌdas]; styled as adidas since 1949) is a German multinational athletic apparel and footwear corporation headquartered in Herzogenaurach, Germany. It is the largest sportswear manufacturer in Europe, and the second largest in the world, after Nike. It is the holding company for the Adidas Group, which also owns an 8.33% stake in the football club Bayern Munich, and Runtastic a fitness technology company. Adidas's revenue for 2024 was listed at €23 billion. Adidas is known for its brand image, extensive long origin history for participating in sponsoring athletes, and gear in the FIFA World Cup series. The brand is also recognized for performance innovation of their shoes with ties within sports culture and durability with their focus of sport shoes, clothing, backpacks, and other accessories.

The company was started by Adolf Dassler in his mother's house. He was joined by his elder brother Rudolf in 1924 under the name Gebrüder Dassler Schuhfabrik ("Dassler Brothers Shoe Factory"). Dassler assisted in the development of spiked running shoes (spikes) for multiple athletic events. To enhance the quality of spiked athletic footwear, he transitioned from a previous model of heavy metal spikes to utilising canvas and rubber. Dassler persuaded U.S. sprinter Jesse Owens to use his handmade spikes at the 1936 Summer Olympics. In 1949, following a breakdown in the relationship between the brothers, Adolf created Adidas and Rudolf established Puma, which became Adidas's business rival.

The three stripes are Adidas's identity mark, having been used on the company's clothing and shoe designs as a marketing aid. The branding, which Adidas bought in 1952 from Finnish sports company Karhu Sports for the equivalent of €1,600 and two bottles of whiskey, became so successful that Dassler described Adidas as "The three stripes company".

The most successful shoe from Adidas is the "Samba", due to its retro design and its versatility.

== History ==
=== Early years: the "Gebrüder Dassler Schuhfabrik" ===
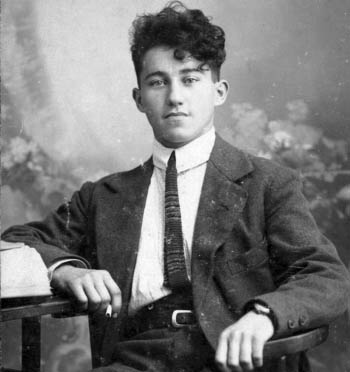
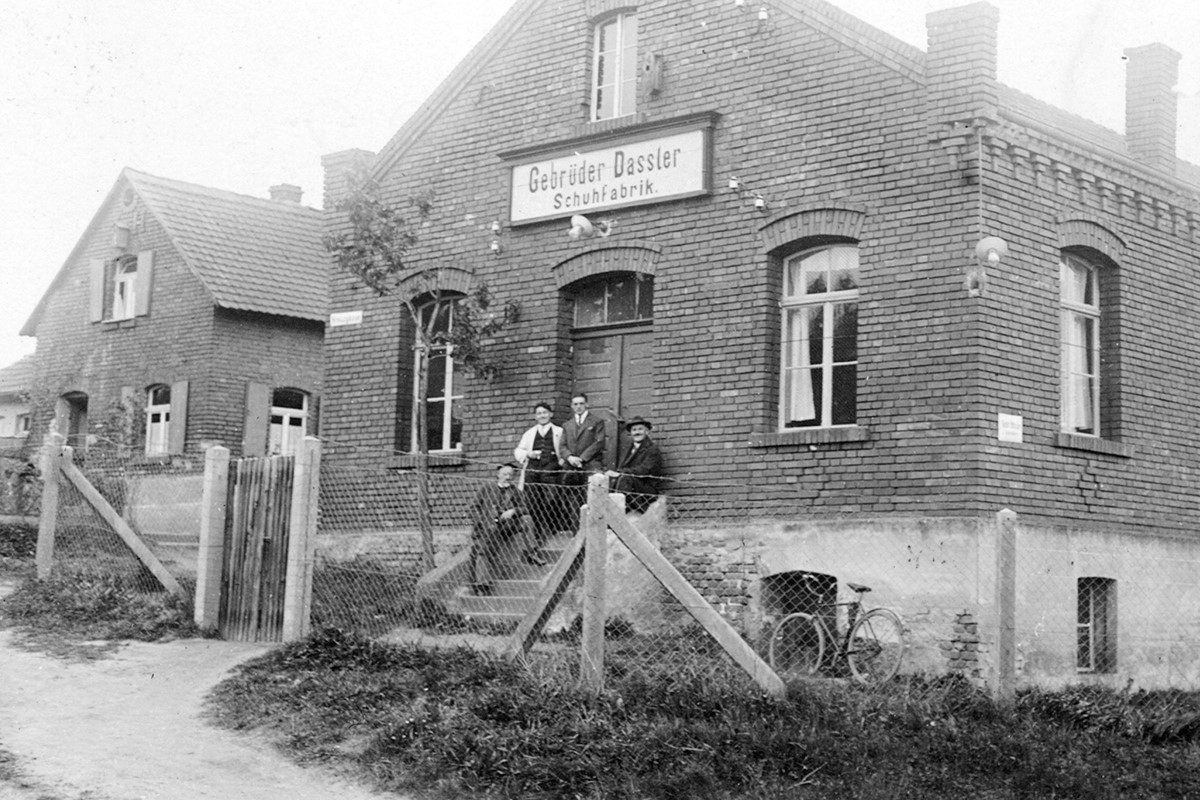
(left): Adolf Dassler, founder of Adidas, c. 1915; (right): the 'Dassler Brothers Shoe Factory' near Herzogenaurach train station in 1928

The company was founded by Adolf "Adi" Dassler who made sports shoes in his mother's scullery or laundry room in Herzogenaurach, Germany after his return from World War I. In July 1924, his older brother Rudolf joined the business, which became "Dassler Brothers Shoe Factory" (Gebrüder Dassler Schuhfabrik). The electricity supply in Herzogenaurach was unreliable, so the brothers sometimes had to use pedal power from a stationary bicycle to run their equipment.

Dassler assisted in the development of spiked running shoes (spikes) for multiple athletic events. To enhance the quality of spiked athletic footwear, he transitioned from a previous model of heavy metal spikes to utilising canvas and rubber. In 1936, Dassler persuaded U.S. sprinter Jesse Owens to use his handmade spikes at the 1936 Summer Olympics. Following Owens' four gold medals, the name and reputation of Dassler shoes became known to the world's sportsmen and their trainers. Business was successful and the Dasslers were selling 200,000 pairs of shoes every year before World War II.

Both Dassler brothers joined the Nazi Party (NSDAP) in May 1933 and became members of the National Socialist Motor Corps. Adolf took the rank of Sportwart in the Hitler Youth from 1935 until the end of the war. During the war, the company was running the last sport shoe factory in Germany and predominantly supplied the Wehrmacht with shoes. In 1943, their shoe production was forced to cease operations and the company's facilities and workforce were used to manufacture anti-tank weapons. From 1942 to 1945, at least nine forced labourers were working at both sites of the company.

The Dassler factory, used for the production of anti-tank weapons during World War II, was nearly destroyed in 1945 by US forces. It was spared when Adolf Dassler's wife convinced the American soldiers that the company and its employees were only interested in manufacturing sports shoes. American occupying forces subsequently became major buyers of the Dassler brothers' shoes.

=== Split and rivalry with Puma ===
The brothers split up in 1947 after relations between them had broken down, with Adolf forming a company registered as Adidas AG, from Adi Dassler, on 18 August 1949, and Rudolf forming a new firm that he called Ruda – from Rudolf Dassler, later rebranded Puma. Urban myths have popularised two false backronyms for the name "Adidas": All Day I Dream About Sports and All Day I Dream About Sex.

Adidas and Puma SE entered into a fierce and bitter business rivalry after the split. The town of Herzogenaurach was divided on the issue, leading to the nickname "the town of bent necks" – people looked down to see which shoes strangers wore. Even the town's two football clubs were divided: ASV Herzogenaurach club was supported by Adidas, while 1 FC Herzogenaurach endorsed Rudolf's footwear. When handymen were called to Rudolf's home, they would deliberately wear Adidas shoes. Rudolf would tell them to go to the basement and pick out a pair of free Pumas. The two brothers never reconciled and although they are now buried in the same cemetery, they are spaced as far apart as possible.

In 1948, the first football match after World War II, several members of the West Germany national football team wore Puma boots, including the scorer of West Germany's first post-war goal, Herbert Burdenski. Four years later, at the 1952 Summer Olympics, 1500 metres runner Josy Barthel of Luxembourg won Puma's first Olympic gold in Helsinki, Finland.

At the 1960 Summer Olympics, Puma paid German sprinter Armin Hary to wear Pumas in the 100 meter sprint final. Hary had worn Adidas before and asked Adolf for payment, but Adidas rejected this request. The German won gold in Pumas, but then laced up Adidas for the medals ceremony, to the shock of the two Dassler brothers. Hary hoped to cash in from both, but Adi was so enraged he banned the Olympic champion.

The "Pelé Pact" was the most notable event in the Dassler brothers feud, when both owners of Adidas and Puma agreed not to sign a sponsorship deal with Pelé for the 1970 FIFA World Cup, feeling that a bidding war for the most famous athlete in the world would become too expensive, only for Puma to break the pact and sign him. Many business experts credit the brothers' rivalry and competition for transforming sports apparel into a multi-billion pound industry.

=== Corporate image ===
(left): the original trefoil Adidas logo until 1997. It is now used on the Adidas Originals heritage line; (right): the 1990–2023 logo, originally designed for the Equipment line, then adopted as the corporate emblem.

In 1952, following the 1952 Summer Olympics, Adidas acquired its signature 3-stripe logo from the Finnish athletic footwear brand Karhu Sports, for two bottles of whiskey and the equivalent of €1,600.

The Trefoil logo was designed in 1971 and launched in 1972, just in time for the 1972 Summer Olympics held in Munich. This logo lasted until 1997, when the company introduced the "three bars" logo (that had been designed by then Creative Director Peter Moore), initially used on the Equipment range of products.

=== Tapie affair ===
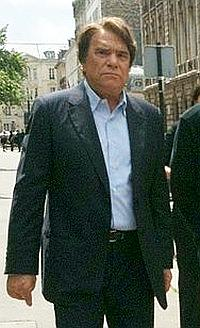
Bernard Tapie, French businessman, owned Adidas from 1990 to 1992 but relinquished control due to debt

After a period of trouble following the death of Adolf Dassler's son Horst Dassler in 1987, the company was bought in 1990 by French industrialist Bernard Tapie, for ₣1.6 billion (now €243.9 million), which Tapie borrowed. Tapie was at the time a famous specialist of rescuing bankrupt companies, an expertise on which he built his fortune.

Tapie decided to move production offshore to Asia. He also hired Madonna for promotion. He sent, from Christchurch, New Zealand, a shoe sales representative to Germany and met Adolf Dassler's descendants, Amelia Randall Dassler and Bella Beck Dassler, and was sent back with a few items to promote the company there.

In 1992, unable to pay the loan interest, Tapie mandated the Crédit Lyonnais bank to sell Adidas. The bank converted the outstanding debt owed into equity in Adidas, which was unusual per the prevalent French banking practice. The state-owned bank had tried to get Tapie out of dire financial straits as a personal favour to Tapie, it is reported, because Tapie was Minister of Urban Affairs (ministre de la Ville) in the French government at the time.

Robert Louis-Dreyfus, a friend of Tapie, became the new CEO of the company in 1994. He was also the president of Olympique de Marseille, a team Tapie had owned until 1993. In 1994, Tapie filed for personal bankruptcy. He was the object of several lawsuits, notably related to match fixing at the football club. In 1997, he served 6 months of an 18-month prison sentence in La Santé prison in Paris. In February 2000, Crédit Lyonnais sold Adidas to Louis-Dreyfus for a much higher amount of money than Tapie owed, 4.485 billion (€683.514 million) francs rather than 2.85 billion (€434.479 million).

=== Post-Tapie era ===
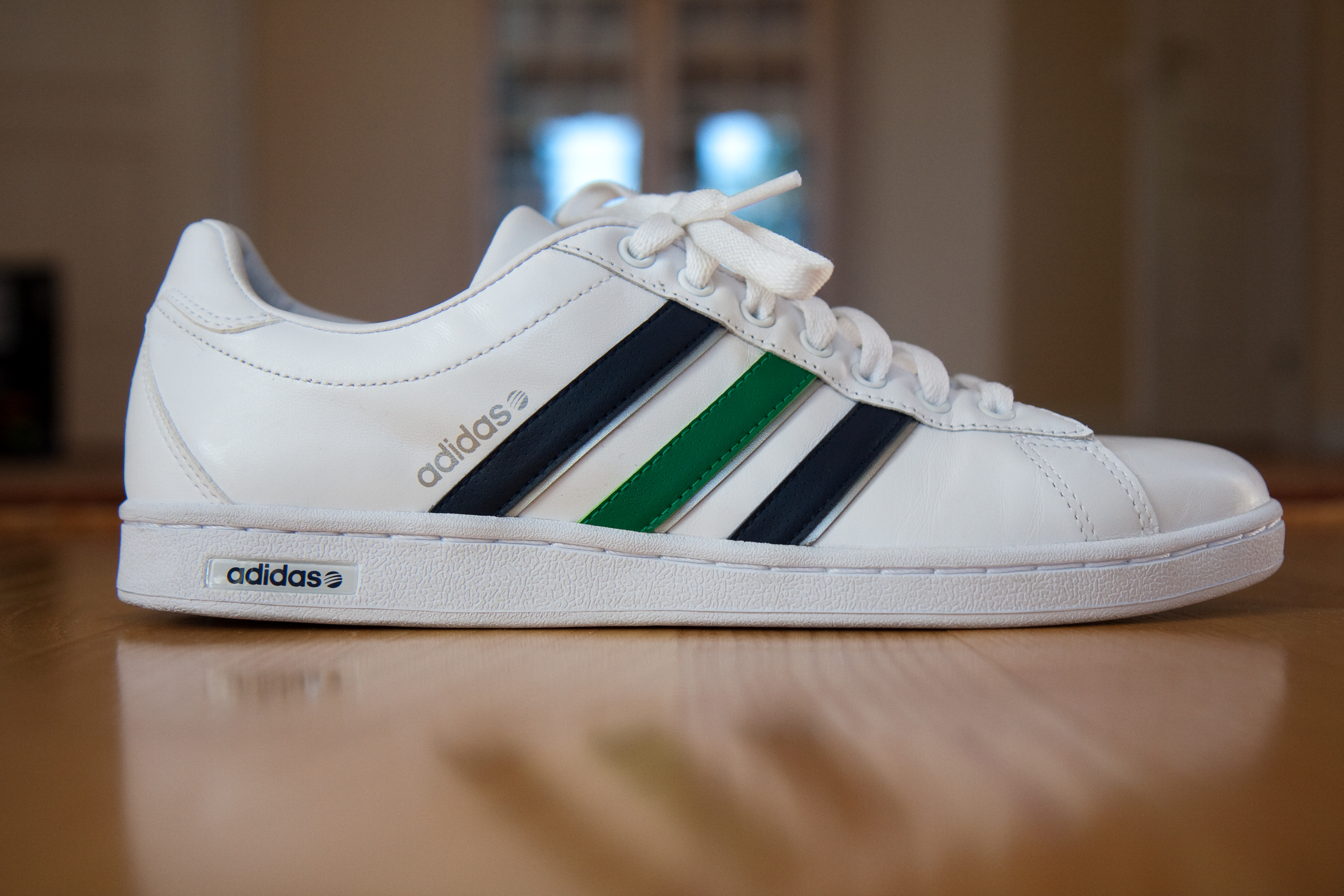
An Adidas shoe, with the company's three parallel bars

In 1994, Adidas partnered with FIFA Youth Group, which raised funds for SOS Children's Villages, a charity for orphaned children which became Adida’s main charitable beneficiary.

In 1997, Adidas AG acquired the Salomon Group who specialized in ski wear, and its official corporate name was changed to Adidas-Salomon AG. With this acquisition Adidas also acquired the TaylorMade golf company and Maxfli, which allowed them to compete with Nike Golf.

In 1998, Adidas sued the NCAA over their rules limiting the size and number of commercial logos on team uniforms and team clothing. Adidas withdrew the suit, and the two groups established guidelines as to what three-stripe designs would be considered uses of the Adidas trademark.

As CEO of Adidas, Louis-Dreyfus quadrupled revenue to €5.84 billion ($7.5 billion) from 1993 through 2000. In 2000, he announced he would resign the following year, due to illness.

In 2003, Adidas filed a lawsuit in a British court challenging Fitness World Trading's use of a two-stripe motif similar to Adidas's three stripes. The court ruled that despite the simplicity of the mark, Fitness World's use was infringing because the public could establish a link between that use and Adidas's mark.

In September 2004, English fashion designer Stella McCartney launched a joint-venture line with Adidas, establishing a long-term partnership with the corporation. This line is a sports performance collection for women called "Adidas by Stella McCartney".

On 3 May 2005, Adidas informed the public that they had sold their partner company Salomon Group for €485 million to Amer Sports of Finland.

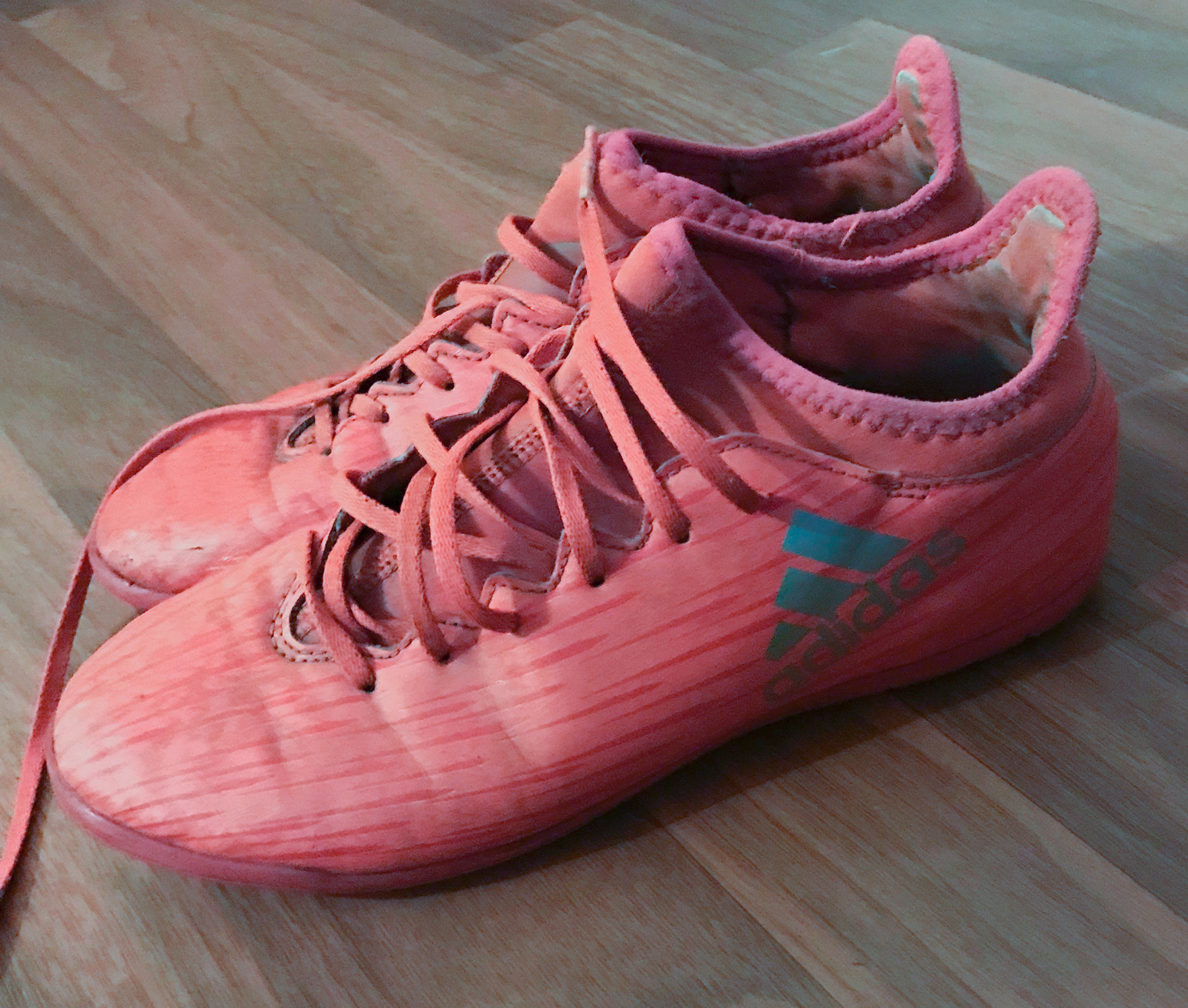
Adidas has long been a popular manufacturer of astro turf football shoes – shown here a recent pair that has been a popular choice.

In August 2005, Adidas declared its intention to buy Reebok for $3.8 billion (US$). This takeover was completed with a partnership in January 2006 and meant that the company had business sales closer to those of Nike in North America. The acquisition of Reebok also allowed Adidas to compete with Nike worldwide as the number two athletic shoemaker in the world.

In 2005, Adidas introduced the Adidas 1, the first ever production shoe to use a microprocessor. Dubbed by the company "The World's First Intelligent Shoe", it features a microprocessor capable of performing 5 million calculations per second that automatically adjusts the shoe's level of cushioning to suit its environment. The shoe requires a small, user-replaceable battery that lasts for approximately 100 hours of running. On 25 November 2005, Adidas released a new version of the Adidas 1 with an increased range of cushioning, allowing the shoe to become softer or firmer, and a new motor with 153 percent more torque.

In April 2006, Adidas announced an 11-year deal to become the official NBA clothing provider. The company has been making NBA, NBDL, and WNBA jerseys and products as well as team-coloured versions of the "Superstar" basketball shoe. This deal (worth over $400 million) took over the previous Reebok deal that had been put in place in 2001 for 10 years.

In November 2011, Adidas announced that it would acquire outdoor action sport performance brand Five Ten through a share purchase agreement. The total purchase price was US$25 million in cash at closing.

=== Recent years ===
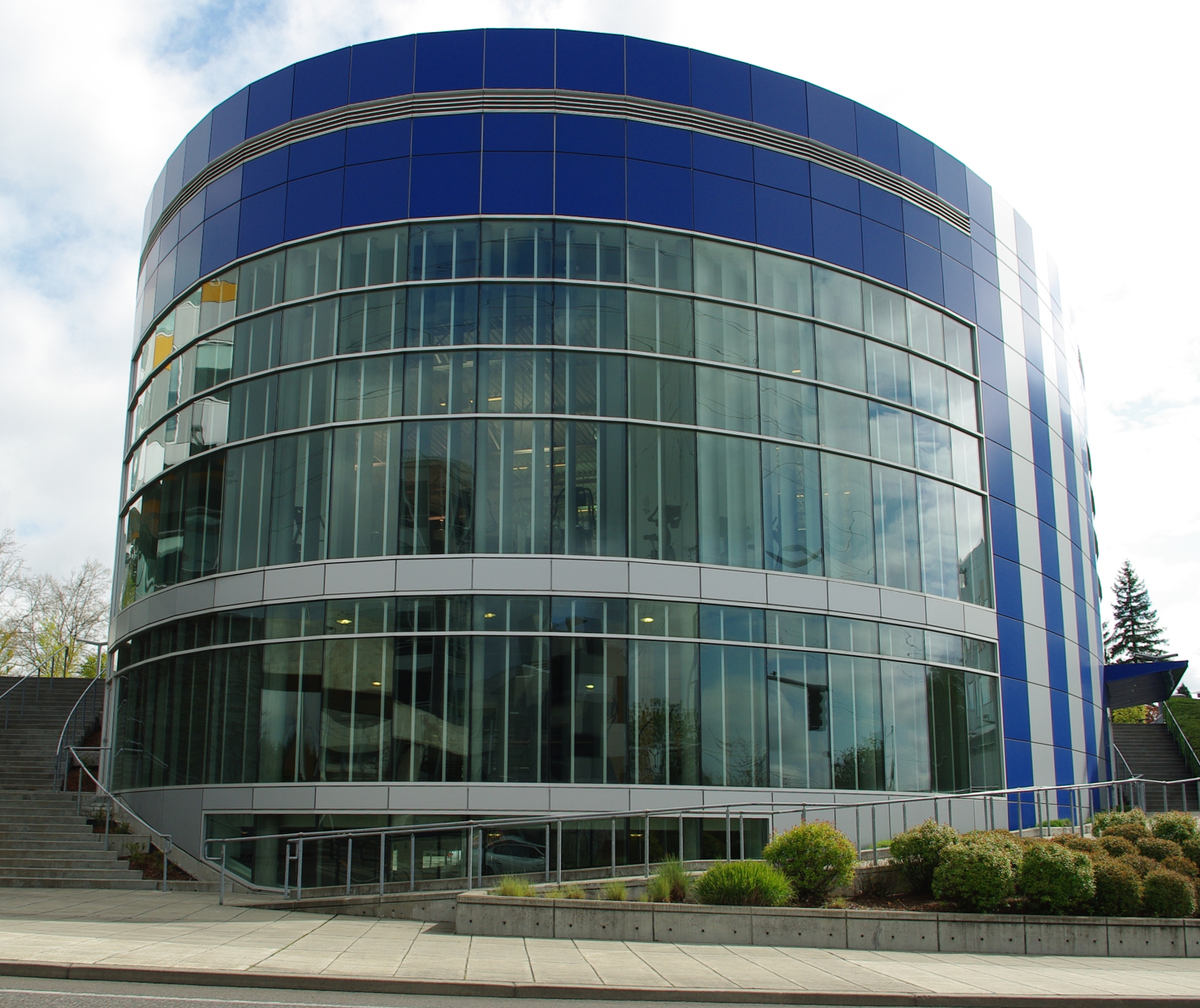
Adidas North America headquarters in Portland, Oregon

By the end of 2012, Adidas was reporting their highest revenues ever and Chief Executive Herbert Hainer expressed optimism for the year ahead. Adidas now has global corporate headquarters in Herzogenaurach, Germany and many other business locations around the world such as London, Portland, Toronto, Tokyo, Australia, Taiwan and Spain.

In January 2015, Adidas launched the footwear industry's first reservation mobile app. The Adidas Confirmed app allows consumers to get access to and reserve the brand's limited edition sneakers by using geo targeting technology.

In March 2015, Adidas and McDonald's unveiled the 2015 McDonald's All-American uniforms. For the third year in a row, players will be wearing short-sleeved jerseys, made with the same lightweight and breathable material as the ones used in the NBA.

In August 2015, Adidas acquired fitness technology firm Runtastic for approximately $240 million.

In 2016, Adidas filed lawsuits against Skechers for making a duplicate Stan Smith design and for Adidas replicas such as "Springblade".

In May 2017, Adidas sold TaylorMade golf company (including Ashworth) to KPS Capital Partners for $425 million.

In February 2021, Adidas banned fur from their products, responding to pressure from animal welfare groups.

In March 2022, Adidas sold Reebok to the Authentic Brands Group, for ca. $2.5 billion.

In August 2022, the company announced that CEO Kasper Rørsted would step down in 2023. Bjørn Gulden became CEO in January 2023.

== Corporate affairs ==
=== Business trends ===
Sales by region (2024)
Business	share
Europe	32%
North America	22%
Greater China	15%
Latin America	12%
Japan/South Korea	6%
Others	14%

The key trends for Adidas are (as at the financial year ending 31 December):

Year	Revenue (Note: "Net sales")(€b)	Net income (Note: "Net income/(loss) attributable to shareholders") (€m)	Effective tax rate (%)	Number of employees	Number of stores	Sources
2006	10.0	483	31.4	26,376		
2007	10.2	551	31.8	31,344		
2008	10.7	642	28.8	38,982	1,884	
2009	10.3	245	31.5	39,596	2,212	
2010	11.9	567	29.5	42,541	2,270	
2011	13.3	613	30.0	46,824	2,384	
2012	14.8	791	29.3	46,306	2,446	
2013	14.4	787	29.2	49,808	2,740	
2014	15.5	490	29.7	53,731	2,913	
2015	16.9	634	32.9	55,555	2,722	
2016	19.2	1,017	29.5	60,617	2,811	
2017	21.2	1,097	29.3	56,888	2,588	
2018	21.9	1,702	28.1	57,016	2,395	
2019	23.6	1,976	25.0	65,194	2,533	
2020	19.8	432	25.4	62,285	2,456	
2021	21.2	2,116	19.4	59,258	2,184	
2022	22.5	612	34.5	61,401	1,990	
2023	21.4	(119)		59,030	1,863	
2024	23.7	756		62,035		

=== Current executive board ===
- CEO: Bjørn Gulden
- Chief Financial Officer: Harm Ohlmeyer
- Global Brands: Eric Liedtke
- Global Operations: Gil Steyaert
- Global Sales: Roland Auschel

=== Former management ===
- CEO (1993–2002): Robert Louis-Dreyfus
- CEO (2002–2016): Herbert Hainer

== Products ==
=== Apparel ===
Adidas manufactures a range of clothing items, varying from men's and women's t-shirts, jackets, hoodies, pants and leggings.

The first Adidas item of apparel was the Franz Beckenbauer tracksuit created in 1967. Adidas AG is the largest manufacturer of sports bras in Europe, and the second largest manufacturer in the world.

=== Sportswear ===
==== Association football ====
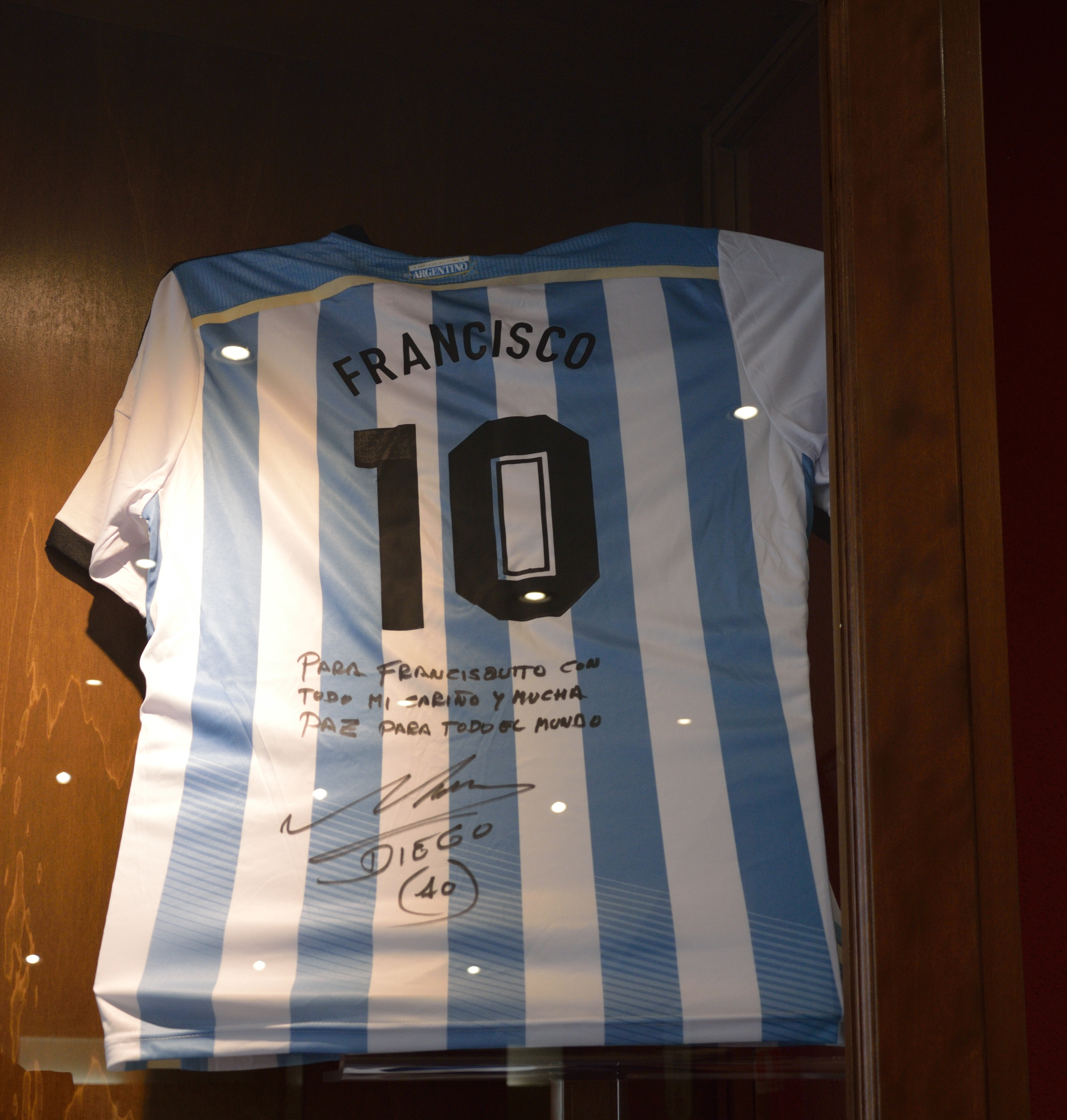
Argentina national team jersey for the 2014 FIFA World Cup, autographed by Diego Maradona

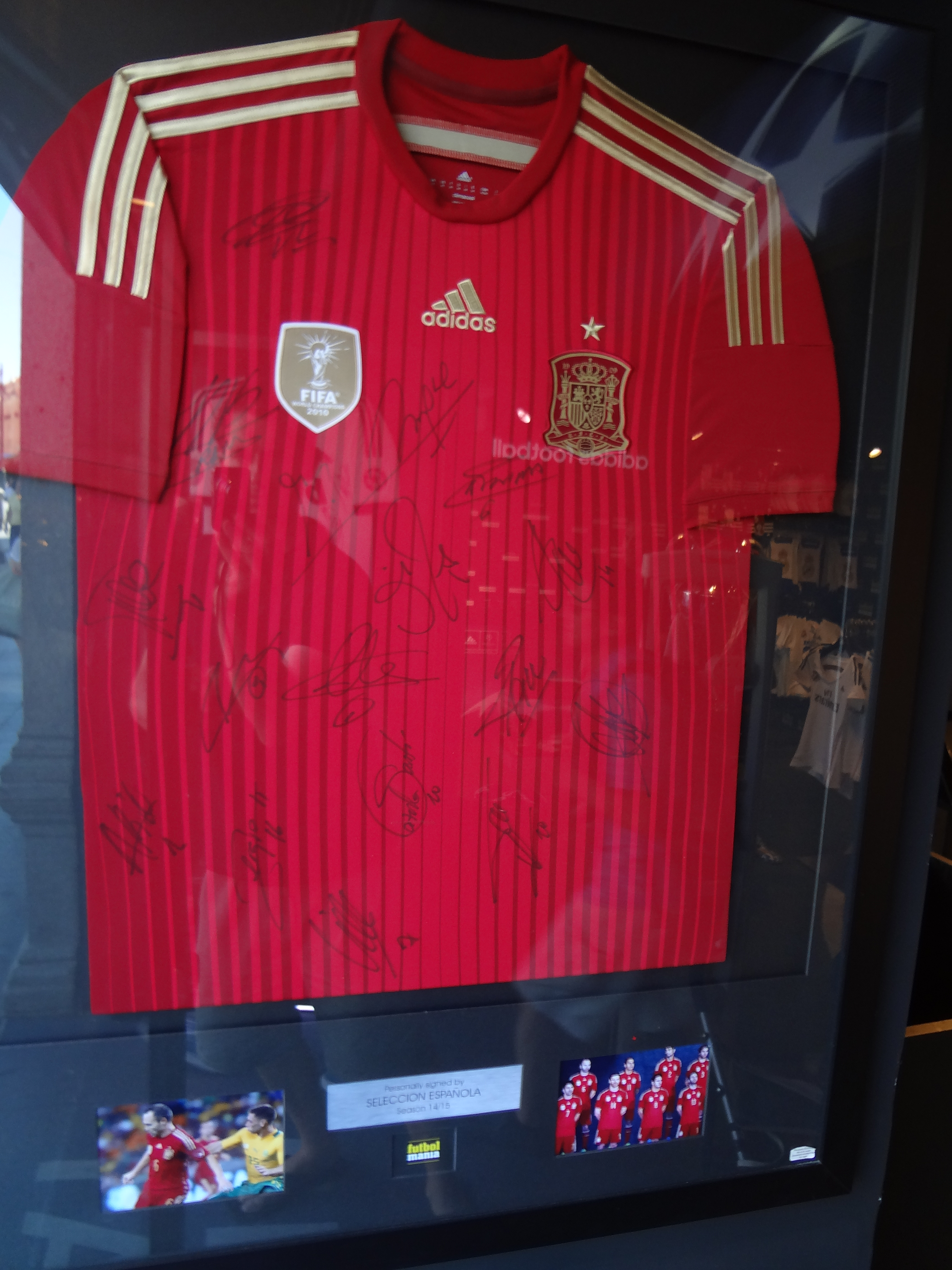
Autographed jersey of the Spain national team for the 2014 FIFA World Cup

One of the main focuses of Adidas has always been football kits, and the associated equipment. Adidas remains a major company in the global supply of team kits for international association football teams and clubs.

Adidas makes referee kits that are used in international competitions and by many countries and leagues in the world. The company has been an innovator in the area of footwear for the sport, with notable examples including the 1979 release of the Copa Mundial moulded boot used for matches on firm dry pitches. It holds the accolade of being the best selling boot of all time. The soft-ground equivalent was named World Cup and it too remains on the market.

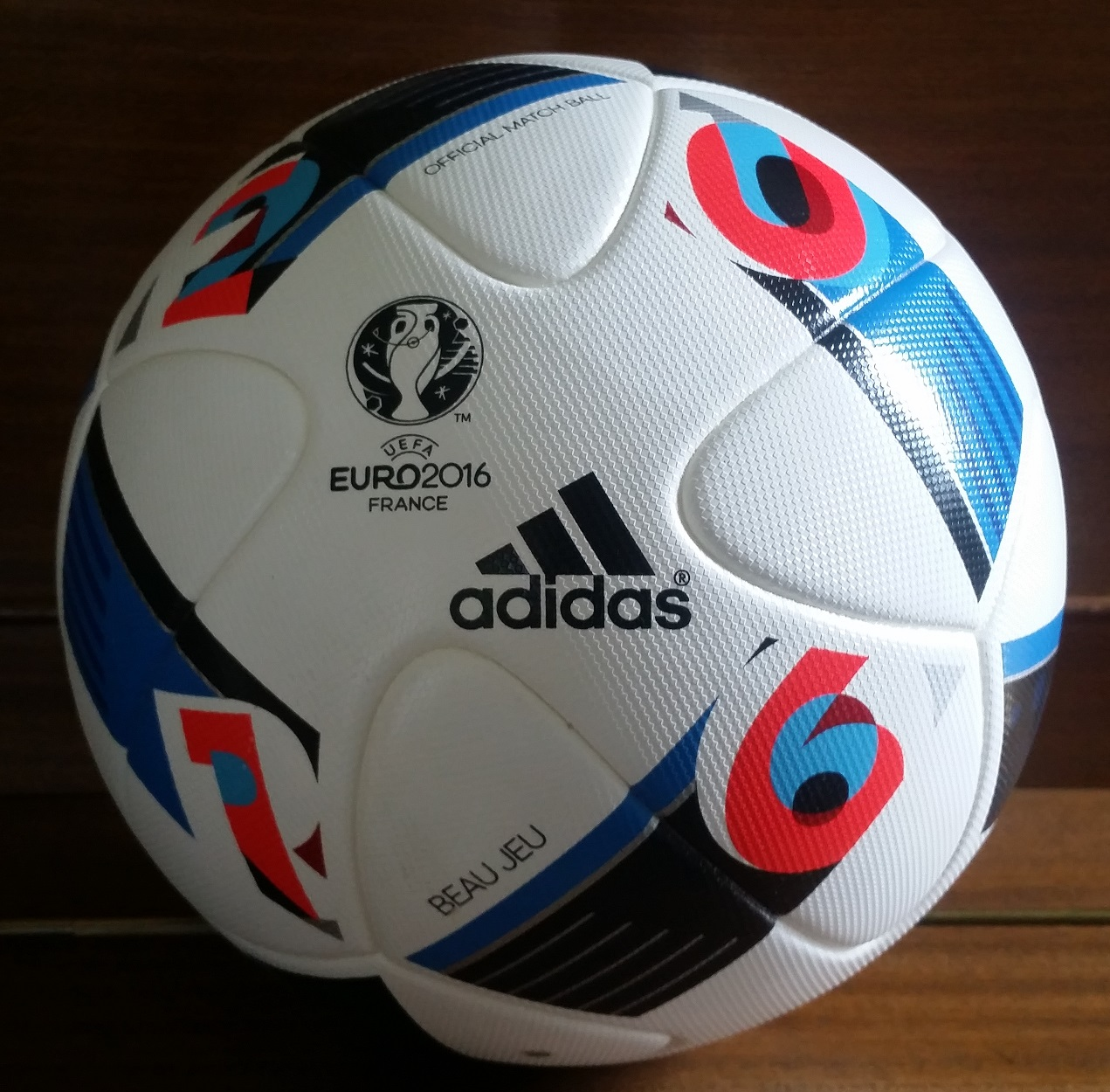
Beau Jeu, which translates to "Beautiful Game" in English, was an official match ball of UEFA Euro 2016.

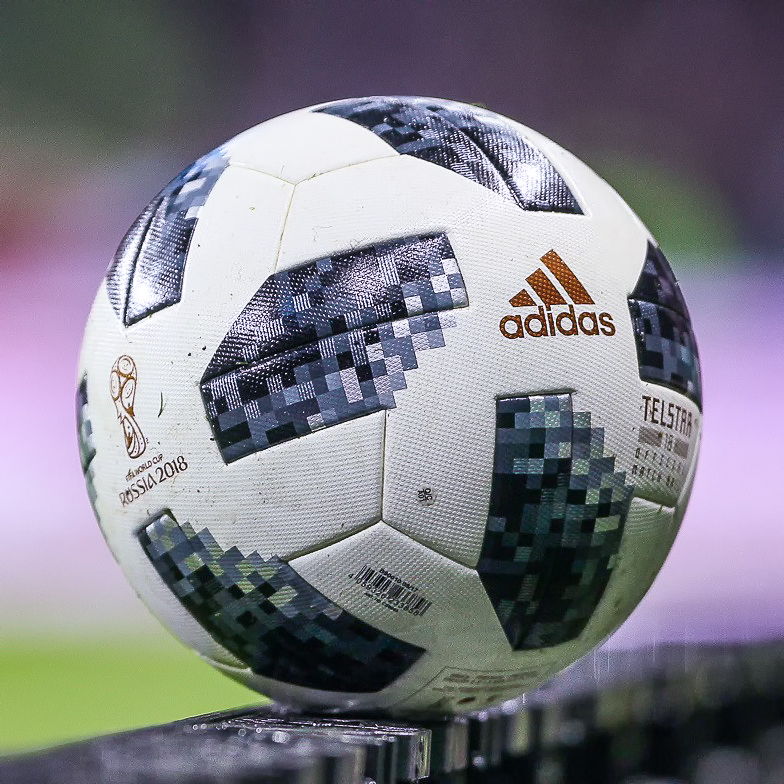
Telstar 18, official ball for the 2018 FIFA World Cup

Since 1970, FIFA, the world's governing body of football, has commissioned specially designed footballs for use in its own World Cup tournaments. The Adidas Telstar was the first ball commissioned for the World Cup in 1970. The balls supplied for the 2006 World Cup, the "Teamgeist", were particularly noteworthy for their ability to travel further than previous types when struck, leading to longer range goals. Goalkeepers were generally believed to be less comfortable with the design of the ball, claiming it was prone to moving significantly and unpredictably in flight.

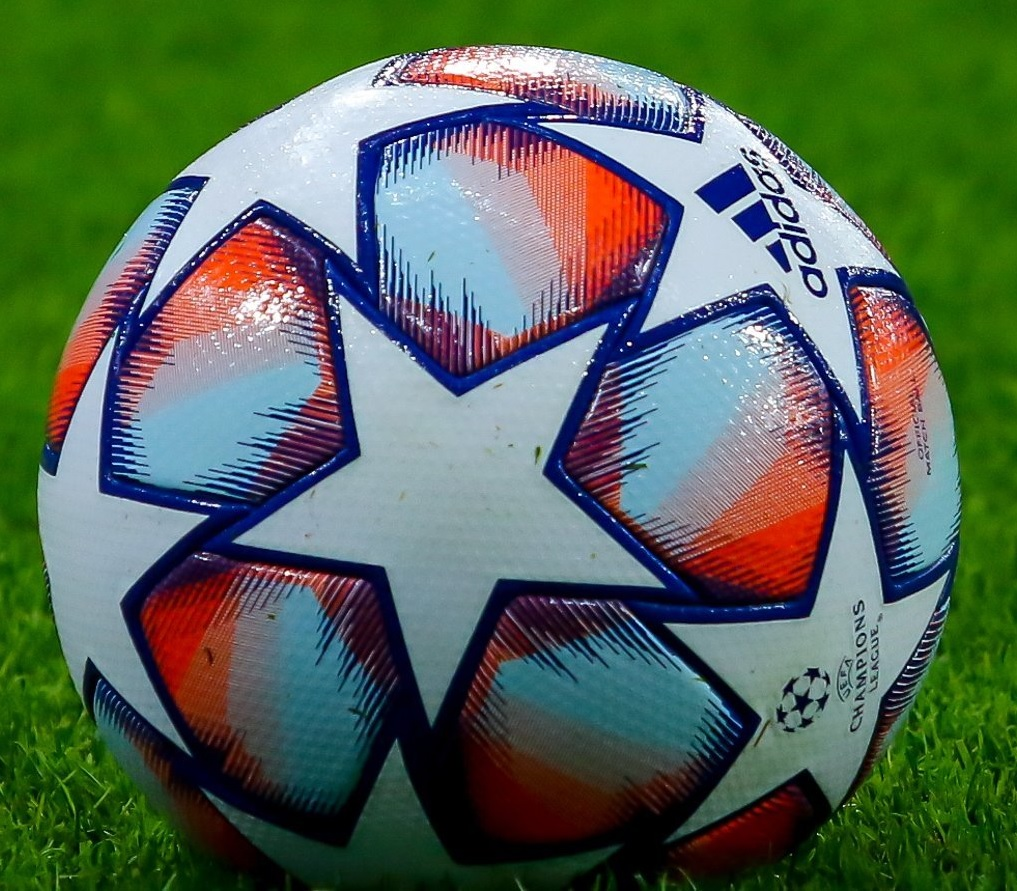
The Adidas Finale (ball in the 2020–21 season pictured) is the official match ball of the UEFA Champions League.

Adidas introduced the Jabulani for the 2010 World Cup. The ball was designed and developed by Loughborough University in conjunction with Bayern München. The Adidas Brazuca for the 2014 World Cup was the first World Cup ball named by the fans. In 2022, for the 14th time in a row, Adidas created the 2022 World Cup ball, Al Rihla.

Adidas is one of the official sponsors of the UEFA Champions League, and the Adidas Finale is the competition's official match ball. Along with the aforementioned Adidas Predator boot, Adidas manufactures the adiPure range of football boots. Adidas named the official match ball of the UEFA Euro 2016 tournament the Adidas Beau Jeu which translates to "The Beautiful Game" in English. Adidas provides clothing and equipment for all teams in Major League Soccer.

==== Baseball ====
Adidas has also provided baseball equipment and sponsors numerous players of Major League Baseball and Nippon Professional Baseball in Japan.

Adidas Baseball hardgoods are licensed to Dick's Sporting Goods.

From 1997 to 2008, Adidas sponsored the New York Yankees.

==== Basketball ====
Adidas's Superstar and Pro Model shoes, affectionately known as "shelltoes" for their stylized hard rubber toe boxes, were fueled by, among others, coaches such as UCLA's John Wooden. Adidas drew about even with Converse in basketball by the mid-1970s before both started to fall behind then-upstart Nike in the early 1980s. Subsequently, Adidas Superstar became very popular in the 1980s hip hop streetwear scene alongside Adidas's stripe-sided polyester suits.

From 2006 to 2017, Adidas was the uniform supplier of all the 30 teams in the National Basketball Association, replacing the Reebok brand after Adidas's acquisition of Reebok. Adidas was replaced by Nike as the official uniform supplier of the league after the 2016–17 season.

==== Cricket ====
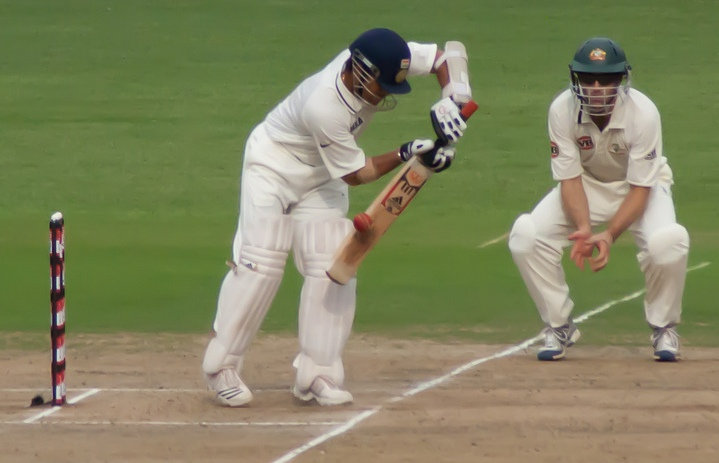
Indian cricketer Sachin Tendulkar, batting with his personalized Adidas cricket bat

Adidas began manufacturing cricket footwear in the mid-1970s, with their initial target market being Australia. Their shoes were a radical departure from traditional leather cricket boots which had remained basically unchanged for decades, being lighter and more flexible but also offering less toe protection, so that it became not uncommon to see batsmen who had been struck by the ball on the foot hopping around in pain. Having continued to manufacture cricket footwear for many years, in 2006 the company finally entered the field of bat manufacture in 2008 and currently their bat range includes the Pellara, Incurza, Libro and M-Blaster models.

In the 1990s, Adidas signed the superstar Indian batsman Sachin Tendulkar and made shoes for him. From 2008 until his retirement, Adidas sponsored the cricket bat used by Tendulkar. It created a new bat, 'Adidas MasterBlaster Elite', personalized for him.

In 2008, Adidas made a concerted move into English cricket market by sponsoring English batting star Kevin Pietersen after the cancellation of his lifetime deal with Woodworm, when they ran into financial difficulties. The following year they signed up fellow England player Ian Bell, Pakistan opening batsman Salman Butt and Indian Player Ravindra Jadeja.

In the Indian Premier League (IPL), Adidas sponsored the team Mumbai Indians from 2008 to 2014 and Delhi Daredevils from 2008 to 2013. They were the official sponsors of Pune Warriors India in 2011 and 2012, however the team was banned from IPL due to payment issues. In the 2015 Season, Adidas sponsored Royal Challengers Bangalore.

In 2023, Adidas sponsored Indian national cricket team as a Sportswear for men's and women's.

==== Formula One ====
In January 2025, it was announced that Formula One team Mercedes entered a multi-year partnership with Adidas.

==== Golf ====
Adidas Golf manufactures golf clothing, footwear, and accessories. Men's and women's equipment includes footwear, shirts, shorts, pants, outerwear (wind suits), base layer and eyewear.

==== Gymnastics ====
From 2000 to 2012, Adidas has provided men's and women's gymnastics wear for Team USA, through USA Gymnastics. USA Gymnastics and Adidas sponsorship concluded at the end of 2012. In 2006, Adidas gymnastics leotards for women and Adidas men's competition shirts, gymnastics pants and gymnastics shorts were available in the United States, with seasonal leotards offered for Spring, Summer, Fall and Holidays. Adidas previously collaborated with GK Elite, and since Spring 2013, Adidas gymnastics products have been available worldwide through Elegant Sports. USA Olympic team members McKayla Maroney, Jordyn Wieber, Jake Dalton and Danell Leyva are all sponsored by Adidas gymnastics.

==== Ice hockey ====
Adidas provided uniforms for the National Hockey League from the 2017–18 season until the 2023–24 season.

==== Lacrosse ====
In 2007, Adidas announced its entry into the lacrosse equipment, also sponsoring the Adidas National Lacrosse Classic in July 2008 for the top 600 high school underclassmen players in the United States. The company made their self into their own brand such as "Adidas Lacrosse", getting several scholarships, Bucknell (men and women), Bryant (men), Delaware (men and women), New Jersey Institute of Technology (men), and D3 powerhouse Lynchburg (men and women in 2016). Materials that Adidas provided were jerseys, shorts, shoes, shafts, heads, gloves, and protective pieces.

Products manufactured for the sport are sticks, gloves, protective gear and boots.

==== Running ====
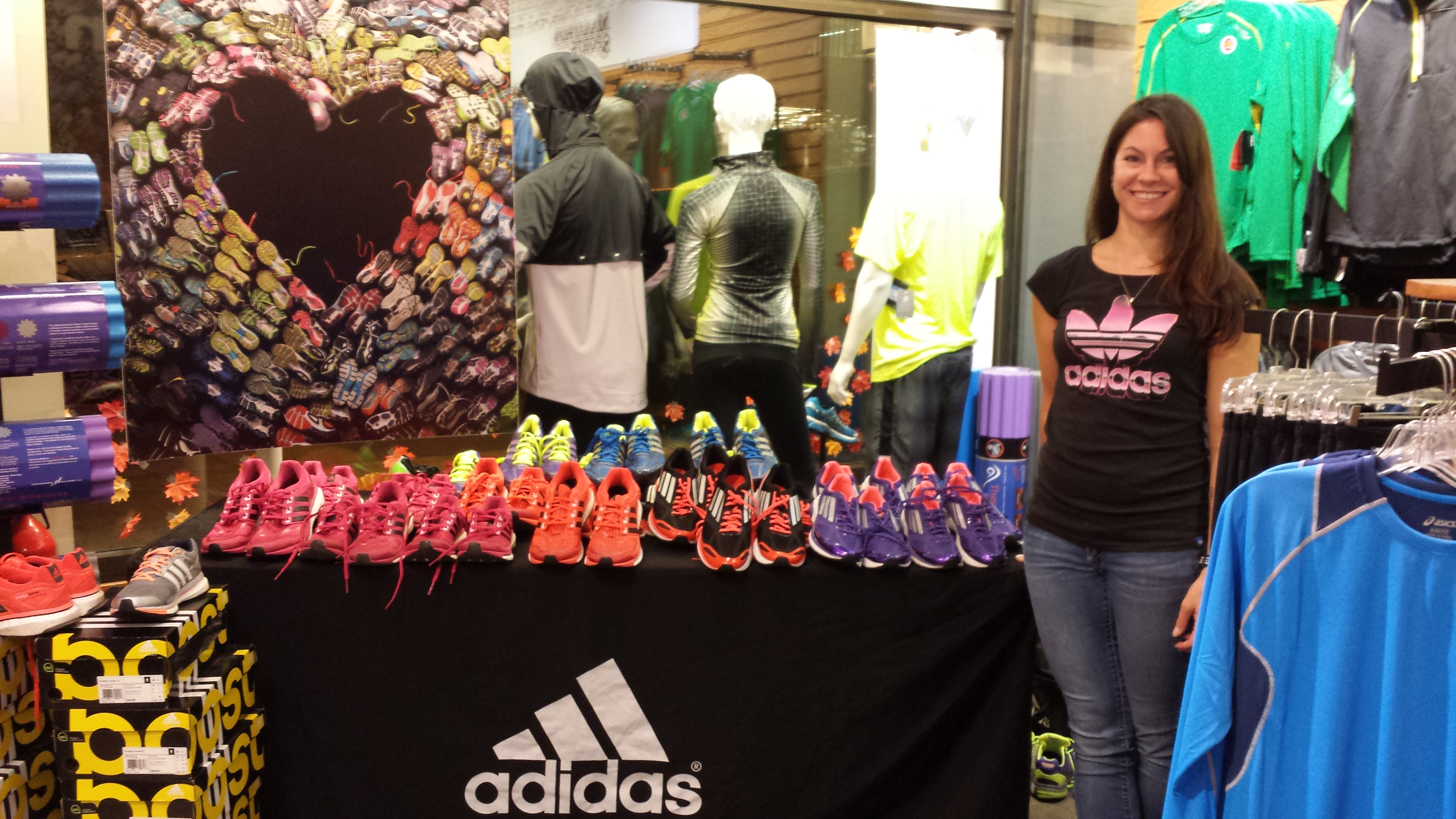
Adidas running shoe demo in Boston

Adidas currently manufactures several running and lifestyle shoes, including the Energy-boost, and the spring-blade trainers. The brand has built a strong runners' network within big European capitals, such as Paris' "Boost Energy League". In 2016, the 3rd season was launched. In Paris, the Boost Energy League gathers 11 teams representing different districts of Paris.

Adidas launched two new colour ways of the NMD R1 and one new colour way of the NMD XR1 in September 2016.

In November 2016, Adidas teased a sneaker made from ocean plastic. The shoe is created from a fabric called "Biosteel". The shoe is called the "Adidas Futurecraft Biofabric". The material used is 15% lighter than conventional silk fibers, and is 100% biodegradable. The shoe only begins to dissolve when it is put in contact with a high concentration of the digestion enzyme proteinase, which occurs naturally. Once this happens, the shoes can decompose within 36 hours. The shoe was never released.

Adidas EQT is a style of sneakers from Adidas. It originated in the early 1990s and was relaunched in 2017. The latest Adidas EQT line released in a "Turbo Red" Pack on 26 January 2017, and included models such as the Adidas EQT Support 93/17, EQT Support ADV, and EQT Support Ultra. Adidas.com is one of the few online retailers.

Adizero is Adidas competitive running line. Compared to most other shoe manufacturers, it uses a unique midsole that uses Thermoplastic Polyester Elastomer to prioritize energy return over comfort. Additionally, it uses carbon rods over carbon plates to decrease weight at the coast of durability. The first two record-eligible sub-two-hour marathon runners, Sabastian Sawe and Yomif Kejelcha, both wore the Adizero Adios Pro Evo 3 in their record-breaking 2026 London Marathon.

==== Skateboarding ====
Adidas Skateboarding produces shoes made specifically for skateboarding, including the redesign of previous models for skateboarding. The brand also releases signature models designed by team riders.

==== Tennis ====
Adidas has been involved with tennis equipment since the mid-1960s and has historically sponsored many top tennis players, beginning with two of the most dominant male tennis players at the start of the professional era in the late 1960s, Stan Smith and Ilie Nastase. During the 1980s and 1990s, not only were they exclusive apparel and footwear sponsors of world number one men's tennis players Ivan Lendl and Stefan Edberg and ladies' world number one Steffi Graf, but each player had their own, exclusive graphic styles designed for their use during play, which were in turn marketed to the general public.

Ivan Lendl even spent the vast majority of his dominant career playing with several different models of Adidas tennis racquets, primarily using the Adidas GTX-Pro and then later the Adidas GTX Pro-T. In 2009, the company introduced a new line of tennis racquets. While the Feather was made for the "regular player", and the Response for the "club player", Adidas targeted the "tournament player" with the 12.2 oz Barricade tour model.

==== Kabaddi ====
Adidas entered Kabaddi which is still a non-Olympic sport but highly popular in the Indian subcontinent and Asian countries. In 2014, with the launch of Pro Kabaddi League a city based franchise league in India, Kabaddi took the region by storm. In 2015, they tied up with Mumbai-based franchise U Mumba.

=== Accessories ===
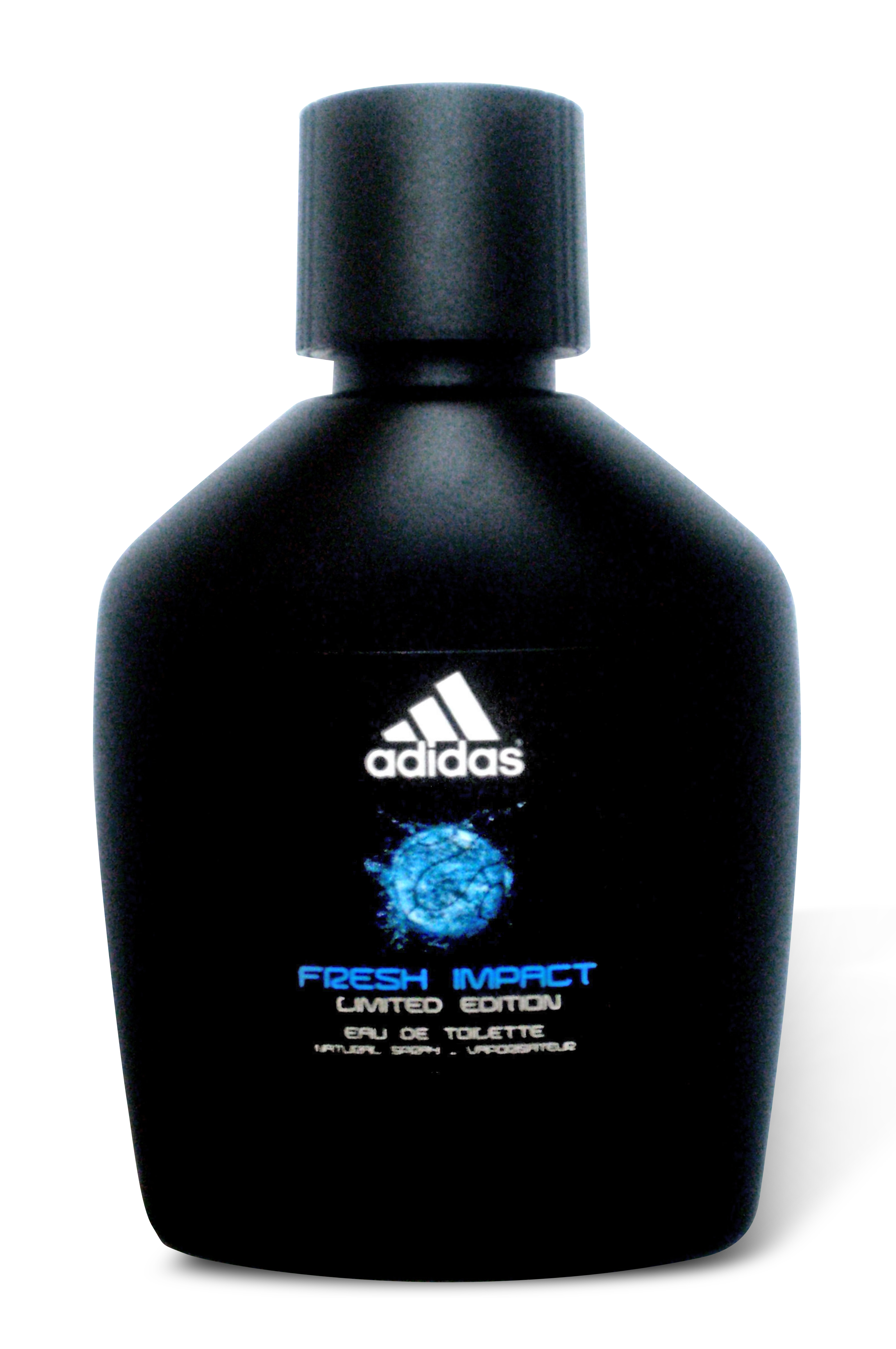
Adidas "Fresh Impact – Limited Edition" bottle

Adidas also designs and makes slide-style sandals, mobile accessories, watches, eyewear, bags, baseball caps, and socks. As well, Adidas has a branded range of male and female deodorants, perfumes, aftershave and lotions.

Adidas announced they would be launching a new $199 Fit Smart wristband in mid-August 2014. The wristband will pair with Adidas's miCoach app, which acts as a personal trainer.

==== Adilette ====
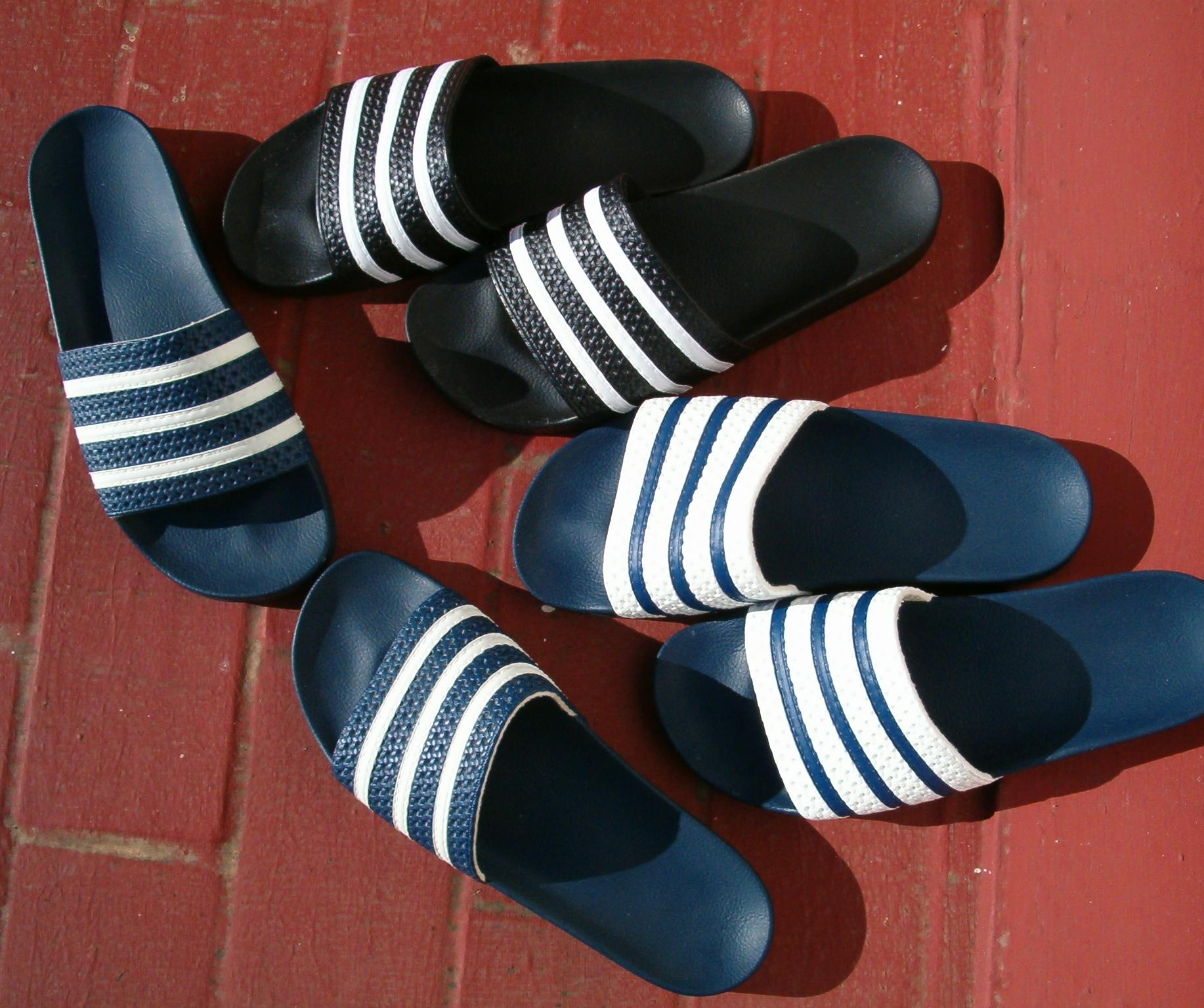
Adilette sandals

Adilette was the first ever pair of sandals made by Adidas, originally developed in 1963. Adidas claims that a group of athletes approached Adi Dassler requesting a shoe be made for the locker room. To this day, the resulting sandals are a best-seller. Since the original navy blue and white Adilette sandals were created nearly fifty years ago, more varieties have been created in different colours (black, red, green, grey, orange, brown, yellow, pink, golden, silver).

Most recently, Adidas has introduced a colour scheme that goes along with its Predator and adizero line; the scheme is dubbed warning (orange) and purple. Usually, the three stripes appear in the contrasting colour on the strap of the classic models. The most common Adilette livery is in navy blue or black, mixed with white colours. Also the Woodilette and Trefoil models follow a similar design but without stripes on the strap.

The model provides a contoured orthopedic rubber sole with synthetic upper, and was designed as an after sport slide sandal, but the Adilette were quickly adopted outside of the sporting world.

==== Adissage ====
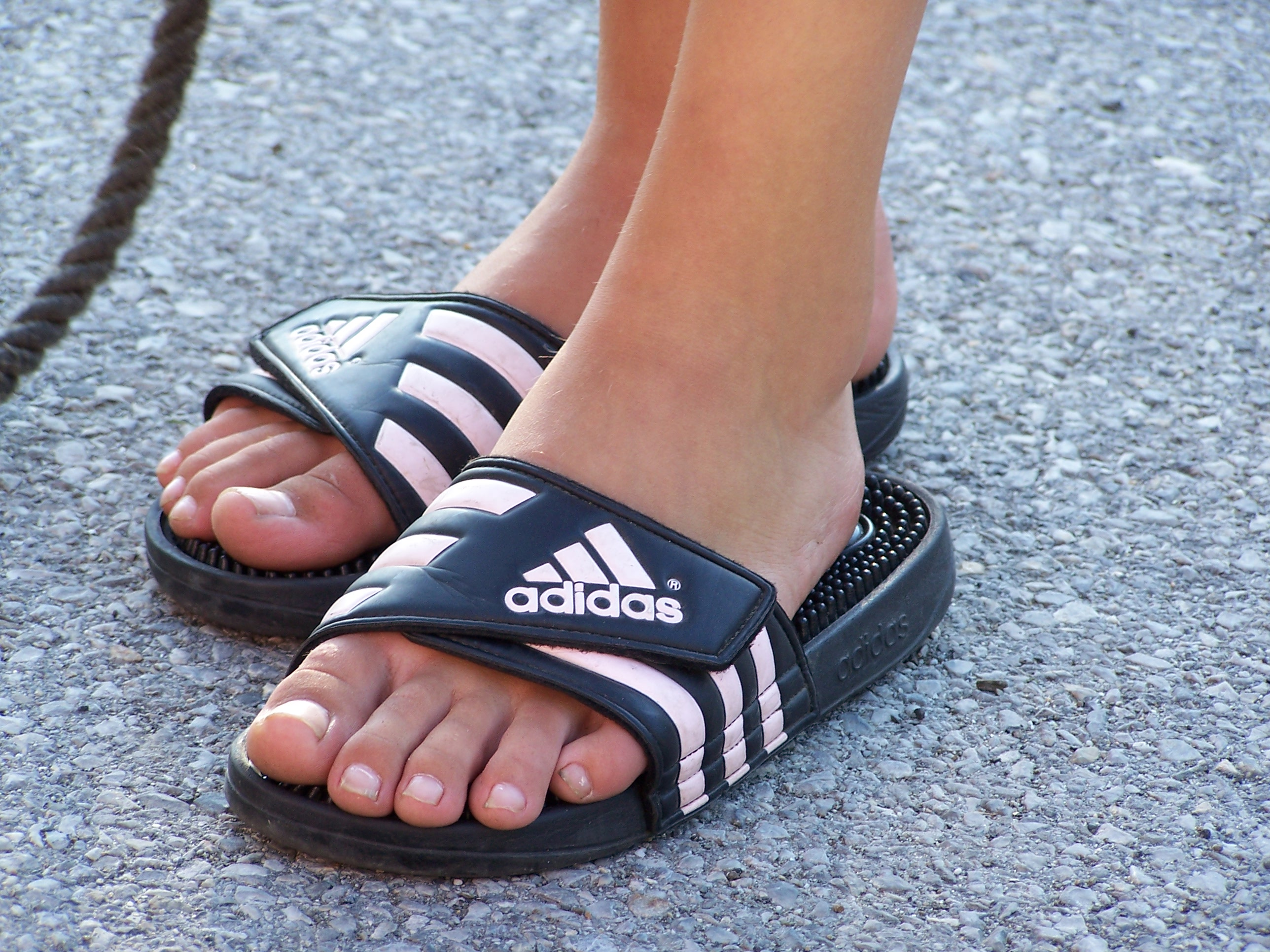
A pair of Adissage

Adissage is also a slide sandal. Available in black, navy, light blue, black with pink, and other assorted colours, the sandal has the trademarked three stripes on a velcro strap toward the front of the shoe. On the side of the shoe, toward the heel on either side, the manufacturers name appears, as well as a round emblem in the actual heel of the footbed. Notably, there are tiny black massage nubs throughout the foot-bed for the purpose of massaging foot aches after sport, although popular as a casual sandal amongst non-athletes as well.

==== Santiossage ====
The Santiossage is a slide-style sandal. The sandal has the trademarked three stripes on a velcro strap toward the front of the shoe. Santiossage comes in black, navy, or red. On the side of the shoe, toward the heel on either side, the manufacturer's name appears, as well as a round emblem in the actual heel of the foot-bed. Like the Adissage there are tiny clear massage nubs throughout the foot-bed for the purpose of massaging after-sport footaches, although the sandals are worn casually among non-athletes. Seen through these clear nubs are Adidas's three stripes.

== Marketing ==
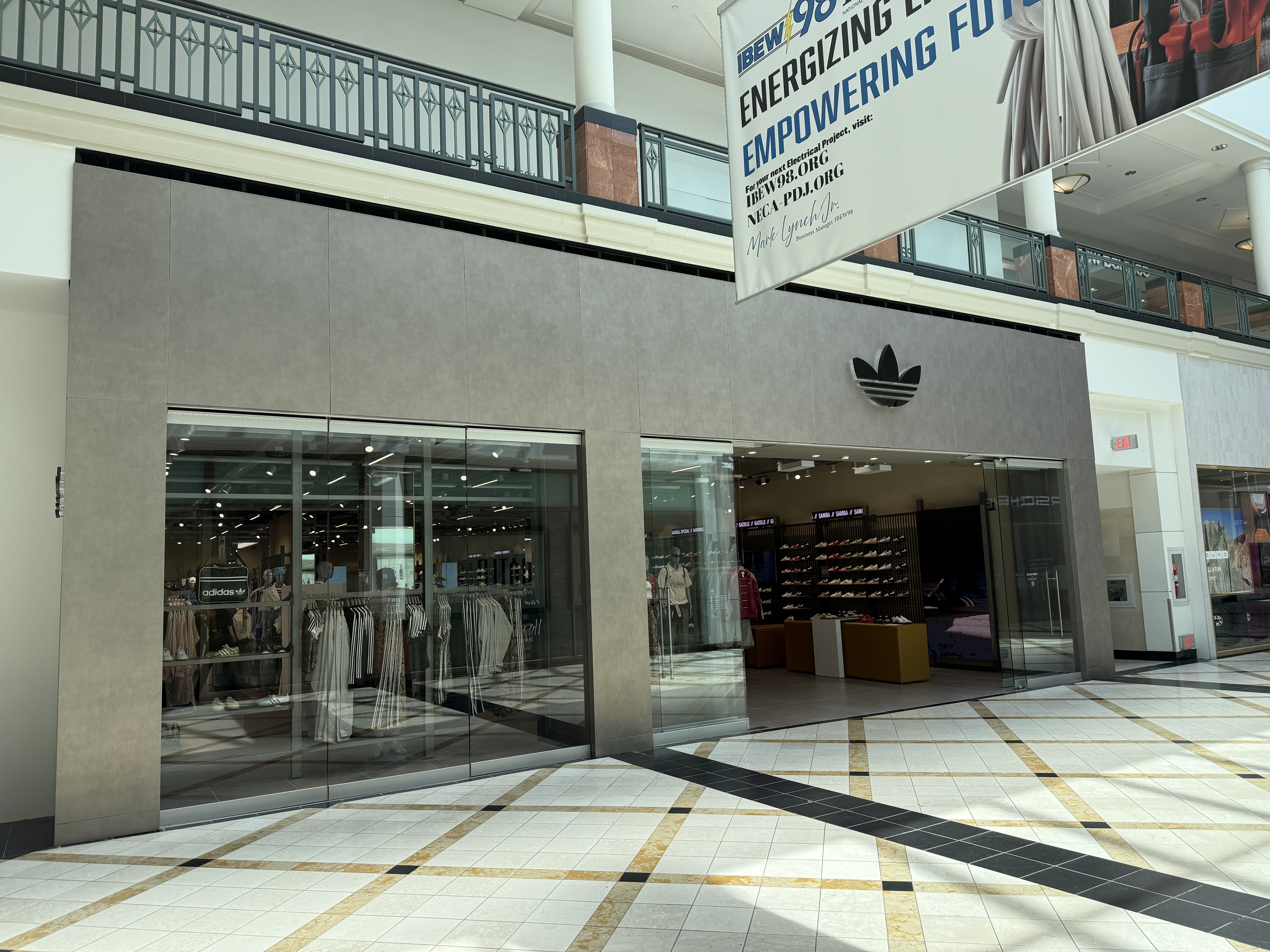
Adidas store at the King of Prussia Mall in King of Prussia, Pennsylvania

During the mid to late 1990s, Adidas divided the brand into three main groups with each a separate focus: Adidas Performance was designed to maintain their devotion to the athlete; Adidas Originals was designed to focus on the brand's earlier designs which remained a popular life-style icon; and Style Essentials, which dealt with the fashion market; the main group within this being Y-3 (which is a collaboration between Adidas and renowned Japanese fashion designer Yohji Yamamoto – the Y representing Yamamoto and the 3 representing the three stripes of Adidas).

Launched in 2004, Impossible is Nothing is one of the company's most memorable campaigns. The campaign was developed by 180/TBWA based in Amsterdam, but significant work was also done by TBWA\Chiat\Day in San Francisco. A few years later, Adidas launched a basketball-specific campaign – Believe in 5ive – for the 2006–2007 NBA season.

In 2011, Adidas is all in became the global marketing strategy slogan for Adidas. The slogan aimed to tie all brands and labels together, presenting a unified image to consumers interested in sports, fashion, street, music and pop culture. There appears to be connection with the phrase "all-in" meaning "exhausted" in some English speaking nations.

In 2015, Adidas launched Creating the New as its strategic business plan until 2020.

=== Collaborations ===
Adidas has done several collaborations with well known designers, including Alexander Wang, Jeremy Scott, Raf Simons, and Stella McCartney. They have also reached out to several celebrities, such as Beyoncé, Jonah Hill, Karlie Kloss, Ninja, Bad Bunny, and Pharrell Williams to create some of the company's most notable and coveted pieces. In 2025, they collaborated with britpop band Oasis for a collection called 'Original Forever' which commemorated the band's legacy with the brand since the 90s.

=== Game advertisement ===
The brand is featured in several games, including Daley Thompson's Olympic Challenge (Commodore Amiga), Adidas power soccer (Sony PlayStation) and Adidas Championship Football (Commodore 64, ZX spectrum, Amstrad CPC).

=== Marketing in India ===
India has been a very speculative market for Adidas. Despite this Dave Thomas, managing director of Adidas in India is ambitious for the country's potential. The company hoped to double its revenue from Rs. 805 crores by 2020. In 2015, the company signed Ranveer Singh a Bollywood actor as a brand ambassador to the company's products. Singh then was a budding actor. The company later decided to use the Indian people's passion for the game of cricket to promote their brand and launched a new cricket campaign in the country. The campaign was called FeelLoveUseHate with Indian cricketer Virat Kohli. However, in 2017, Virat Kohli was removed as the brand ambassador of the company. The cricketer later signed a major deal with Puma India. The company also sells its products online through e-commerce websites such as Myntra, Snapdeal, Jabong and Amazon. Adidas also has a website dedicated to the Indian audience that markets and sells products to its consumers in India.

=== Marketing in the Soviet Union ===
Adidas provided outfits for the Soviet Union's team in the 1980 Summer Olympics, making them one of the first global brands to enter the territory. The Communist Party prohibited the usage of the company logo on Soviet tracksuits, changing the design from three stripes to one red stripe. The shoes remained unchanged, as the three stripes resembled an "M", hinting that the Olympics were being held in Moscow. The brand later became a staple of the Gopnik subculture.

== Sponsorship ==
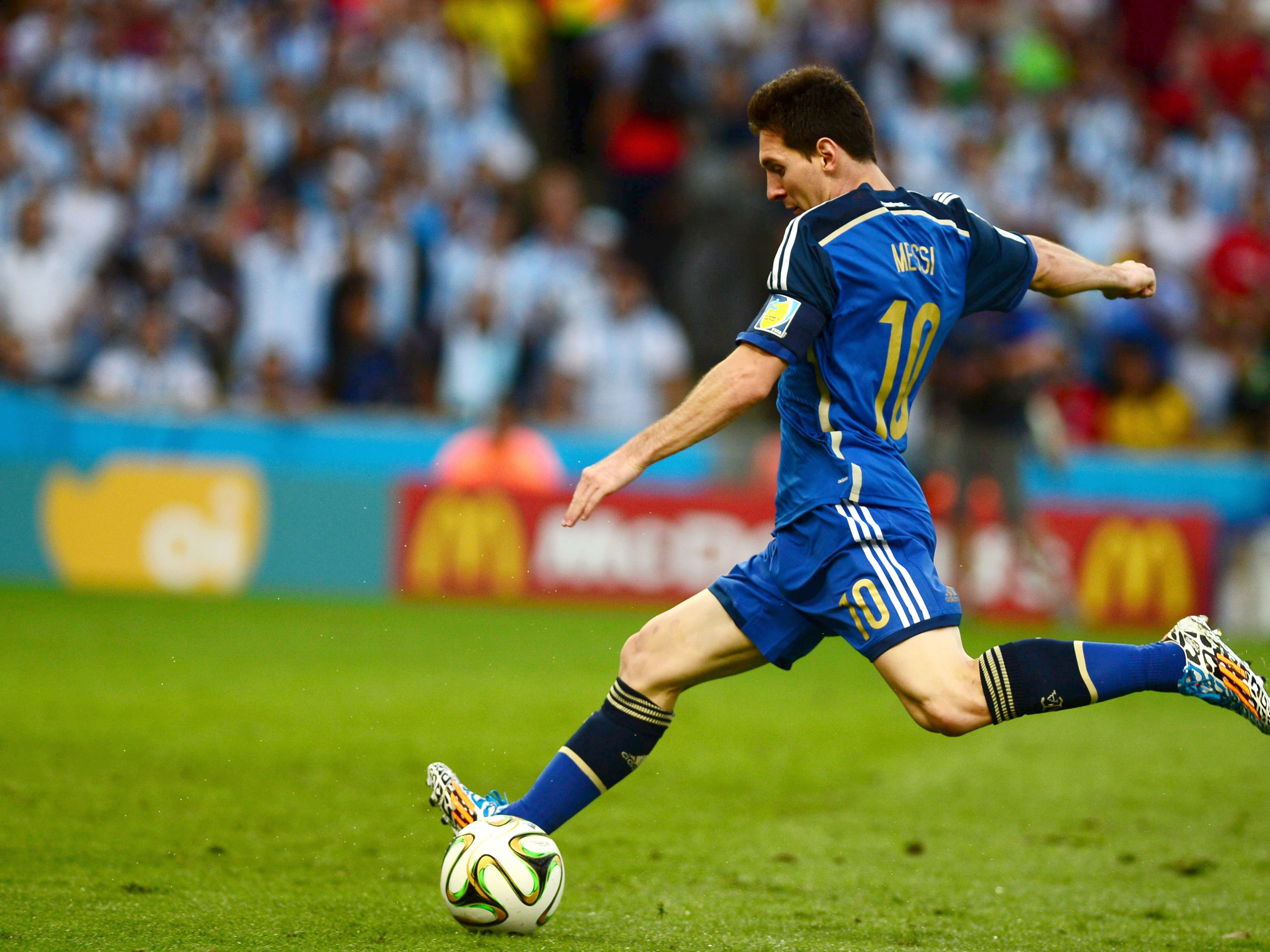
Lionel Messi, who is sponsored by Adidas, prepares to shoot with his dominant left foot during the final of the 2014 FIFA World Cup.

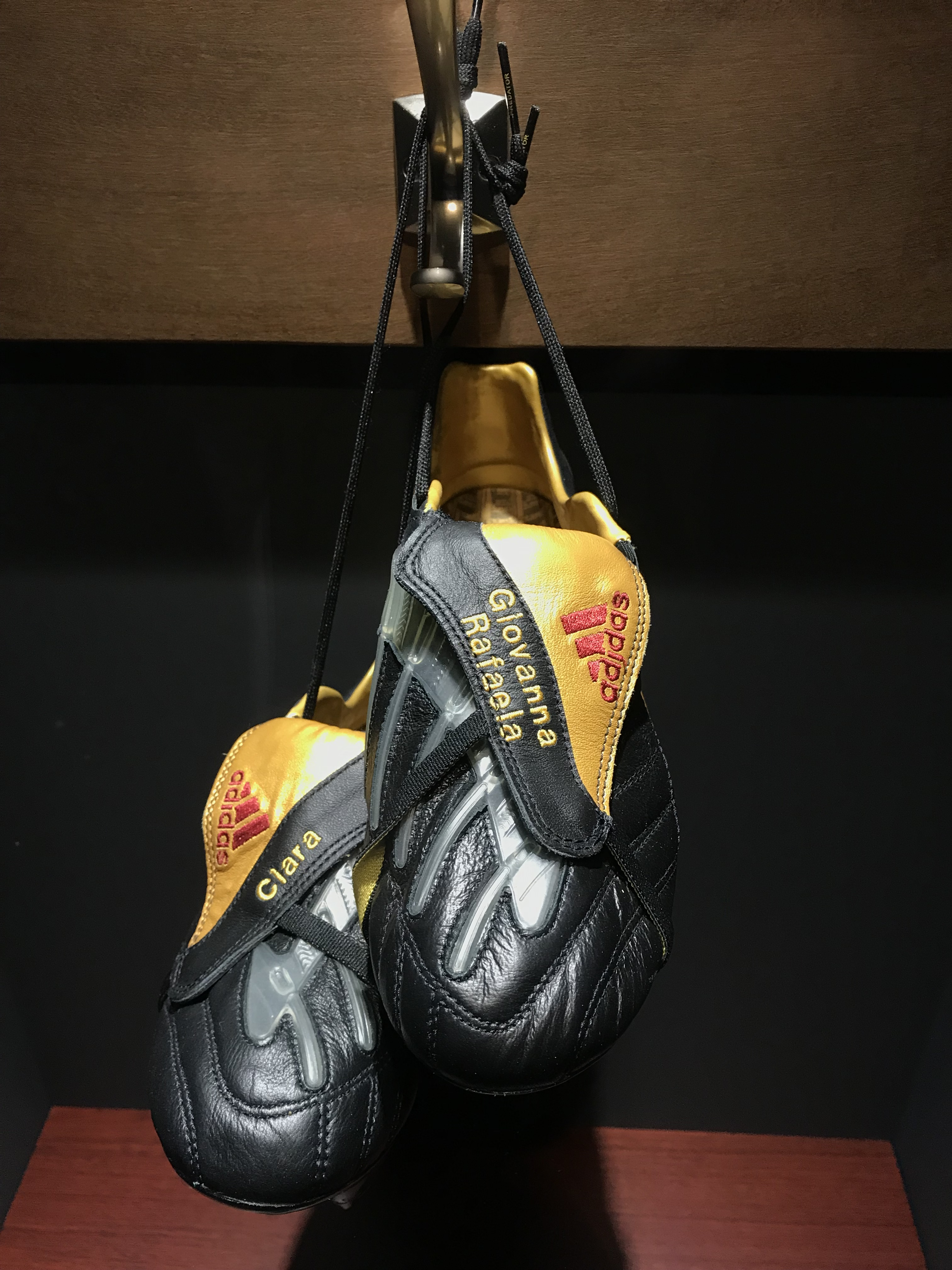
Developer of the "knuckle ball" technique at free-kicks, Juninho's Adidas boots in a museum

Adidas has sponsored famous football players, including Zinedine Zidane, David Beckham, Franz Beckenbauer, Thomas Müller, Karl-Heinz Rummenigge, Michael Ballack, Oliver Kahn, Steven Gerrard, Gareth Bale, Alessandro Del Piero, Bernardo Silva, Raúl, Xavi, Iker Casillas, Arjen Robben, Sergio Goycochea, Kaká, Juninho, Paul Pogba, Luis Suárez, George Weah,etc.

In 2026, the adidas top football players are Lionel Messi, Lamine Yamal, Jude Bellingham, Declan Rice, Raphinha, Rodrygo, Pedri, Mohamed Salah, Scott McTominay, Son Heung-min and Alexis Mac Allister.

Adidas has numerous major kit deals with football clubs worldwide, including Bayern Munich, Real Madrid, Manchester United, Arsenal, Liverpool, Aston Villa, Newcastle United, Juventus, Roma and Benfica. Moreover, their sponsored national teams include Germany, Italy, Spain, Argentina, Sweden, Japan, Hungary, Belgium, Croatia, Ukraine, Greece, Mexico, Colombia, Chile, Costa Rica, Peru, Jamaica, Venezuela, Qatar, Saudi Arabia, United Arab Emirates, Algeria, South Africa, Kosovo and Singapore.

Adidas is one of the official sponsors of the UEFA Champions League, and the Adidas Finale is the competition's official match ball. Adidas footballs are the official ball of top-level leagues in Germany, Argentina, United States, Japan, Turkey, Saudi Arabia as well as the Singapore Premier League. Along with the Adidas Predator boot, Adidas manufactures the adiPure range of football boots. Adidas provides clothing and equipment for all teams in Major League Soccer (MLS).

In July 2014, Adidas and Manchester United agreed to a ten-year kit deal, beginning with the 2015–16 Premier League season. This kit deal has a guaranteed minimum value of £750 million (US$1.29 billion), making it the most valuable kit deal in sports history, and replaced rival Nike as the club's global equipment partner.

In July 2019, Adidas and Arsenal agreed to a five-year kit deal, beginning with the 2019–20 Premier League season. This kit deal has a guaranteed minimum value of £300 million (US$406.41 million) and replaces rival Puma as the club's global equipment partner.

In August 2025, Adidas and Liverpool agreed to a ten-year kit deal, beginning with the 2025–26 Premier League season. This kit deal has a guaranteed minimum value of £60 million (US$81.28 million) and replaces rival Nike as the club's global equipment partner.

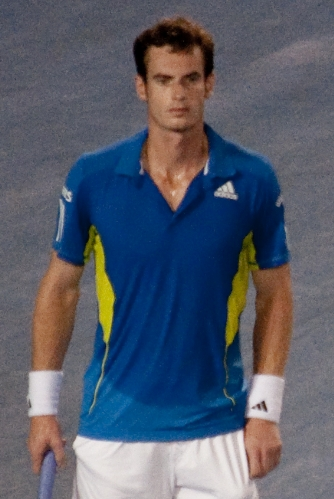
Andy Murray endorsed Adidas from the start of the 2010 season until the end of the 2014 season, receiving US$4.9 million per year.

In November 2009, World Number 4 tennis player Andy Murray was confirmed as Adidas's highest-paid star with a five-year contract reportedly worth US$24.5 million. In Cincinnati, at the ATP Tennis Tournament in Mason, they have also sponsored the ball-boy and ball-girl uniforms. Adidas is also partners with Malibu Tennis Camp, Green Fitness GmbH and with Schöler & Micke Sportartikel Vertriebs GmbH.

Adidas has sponsored numerous basketball players like Kareem Abdul-Jabbar (first ever NBA player signed with Adidas and first ever player overall with signature shoes), Chauncey Billups, Tim Duncan, Brandon Knight, Jeremy Lin, Tracy McGrady, Iman Shumpert and present players like James Harden, Damian Lillard, Donovan Mitchell, Candace Parker, Derrick Rose, John Wall and Trae Young. Adidas also endorsed Kobe Bryant with the Adidas Equipment KB8 as his first signature shoe until July 2002. The company also endorsed Kevin Garnett until he opted out of his contract in 2010. Gilbert Arenas was an Adidas endorser until 2010. In August 2015, James Harden left Nike for Adidas by signing a 13-year contract reportedly worth US$200 million.

In rugby union, Adidas is the current kit supplier to the All Blacks, the France national team and the South African Stormers and Western Province rugby union teams among others. Adidas is also the New Zealand Rugby Union clothing sponsor and supplies clothing to all Super Rugby franchises up till 2022, a selection of domestic teams and national referees. Adidas are also the official match ball supplier to the Heineken Cup. Adidas was the British and Irish Lions kit supplier from 1997 to 2013. They are the jersey manufacturers of the Gold Coast Titans Rugby League club in the Australasian National Rugby League. Dual rugby and league international and former boxer Sonny Bill Williams is a global ambassador for Adidas.

Adidas has provided field hockey equipment and sponsors numerous players of Germany, England, Netherlands, Australia, Spain and Belgium. The company has been the kit provider of Argentine women's and men's teams for over 15 years. The company also sponsored clubs Reading, Beeston and East Grinstead.

Adidas also sponsors professional golfers including Collin Morikawa, Ludvig Åberg, Nick Dunlap, Daniel Berger and Nick Taylor. Since Adidas does not make golf equipment the sponsorship is more limited to clothing and shoes.

In ice hockey, Adidas signed an agreement with National Hockey League (NHL) to be the official outfitter of uniforms and licensed apparel, starting in the 2017–18 season, and lasting through the 2023–24 season.

Adidas's cricket sponsorships include cricketers Lasith Malinga, Kieron Pollard, Dwayne Bravo and K. L. Rahul. Adidas's volleyball sponsorships include Ivan Zaytsev and Earvin N'Gapeth, who advertises as a model and brand ambassador for Adidas.

== See also ==
- Adidas Originals
- Puma (brand), formed by Rudolf Dassler, brother of Adolf Dassler
