= Slide (footwear) =

Open-toed slip-on sandal shoe

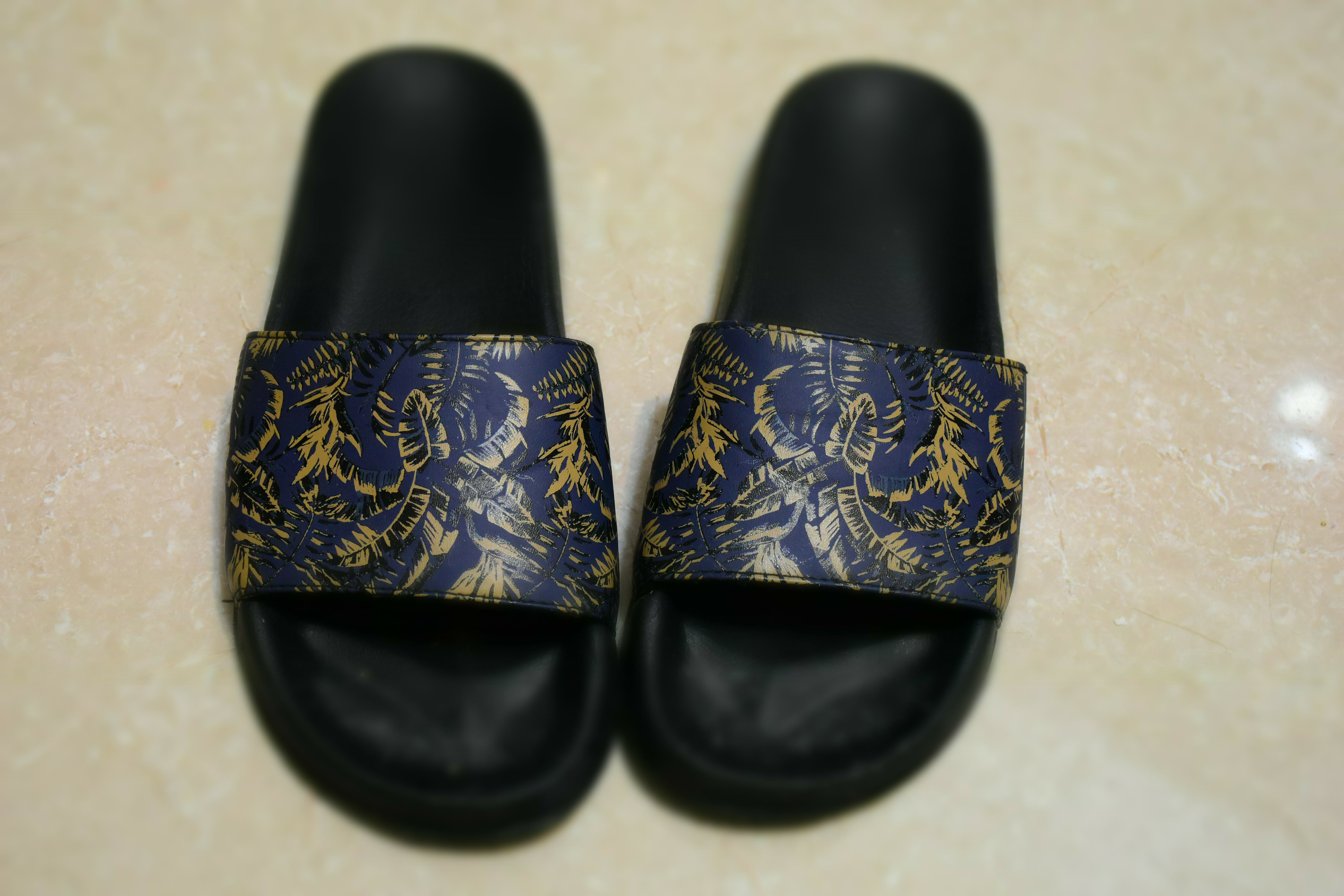
Black sliders

Slides or sliders are a type of light shoe that is characterized by having a loose heel that holds on to the foot from the front. Like flip-flops, they are typically employed in casual situations, in addition to being unisex footwear worn by both sexes. Sliders are distinguished from flip-flops by their vamp strap which does not separate the big toe from the rest of the toes.

== Description ==
Slides can be high-heeled, flat-heeled or somewhere in between, and may cover nearly the entire foot from ankle to toe, or may have only one or two narrow straps. They usually include a single strap or a sequence of straps across the toes and the lower half of the foot to hold the shoe on the foot. The term is descriptive in that this shoe is easy to 'slide' on and off the foot when the wearer wants to do so. Slides do not have a Y-shaped strap, like the flip-flop. They generally consist of a sole and a simple upper strap, the latter having the purpose of keeping them attached to the foot. Their uppers can be smooth and continuous or have fasteners, such as buckles or Velcro. Unlike slippers and mules, which are closed at the front, slide shoes are never closed at the front, they leave the toes visible and in the open air.

They can be made with any type of material, from leather to fabric, from natural fibers to synthetic materials. They are mainly used at the beach or at the swimming pool. Slides are still designed to be light and comfortable, and to make the foot breathe easier when it's hot, just like flip flops. In recent years, some footwear brands have introduced slides made using recycled and low-impact materials, reflecting a broader shift toward sustainability in casual footwear, such as those produced by Indian Brand Neeman’s.

== Health ==
Flat slides are problematic as they provide no arch support and little cushioning, leading to the foot arch collapsing over time. This pulls the Achilles tendon, potentially causing shin splints, heel and/or arch pain, or tendinitis. Slides typically aren't designed with a front and back end, which forces the wearer's toes to grip harder to keep the footwear in place, causing foot pain, and with more frequent usage it could change the toe's natural shape and growth, leading to hammertoes. These issues can be solved by wearing slides with a higher heel height, and more secure straps.

== History ==
The popularity of slides in the United States started in the late 1960s, when vibrant, colorful aesthetics, such as cherry flower motifs, were followed. Across the world in Germany, the brand Birkenstock created the first fitness slide, a simple design made from contoured cork with a single-buckled leather strap. Another German company, Adidas, invented the well-known Adilette pool slide.

== Fashion ==
High fashion designers such as Prada, Nike, Gucci, Burberry, Walk London and Marc Jacobs have included them in their collections. The different designs and ideas that come from the designers are expansive. Crafting slides from premium grade leathers and suedes, feathers to using floral patterns, faux-fur lining and regal pearls being attached or used as the main design behind slides.

== Gallery ==
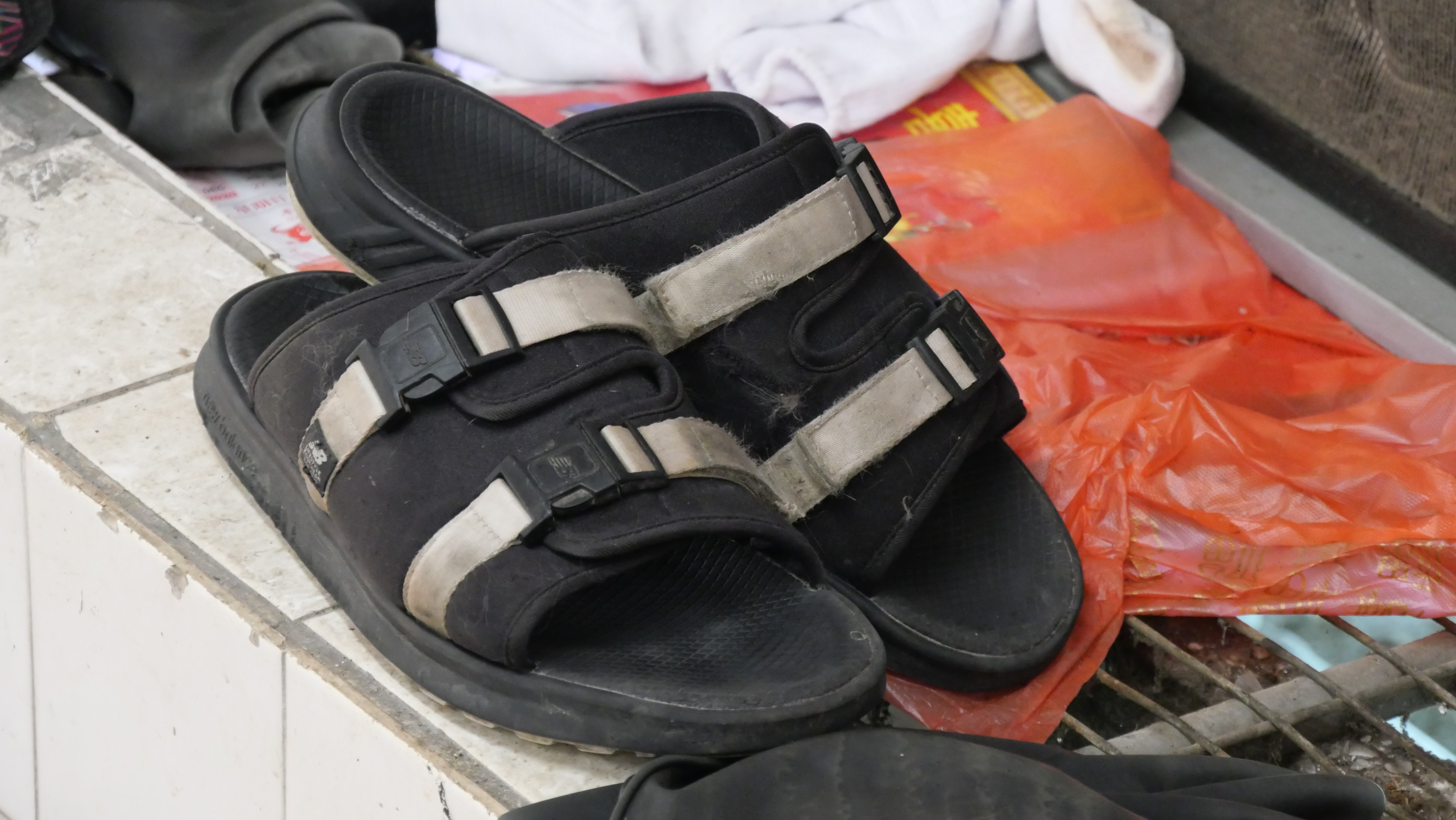
New Balance Slides

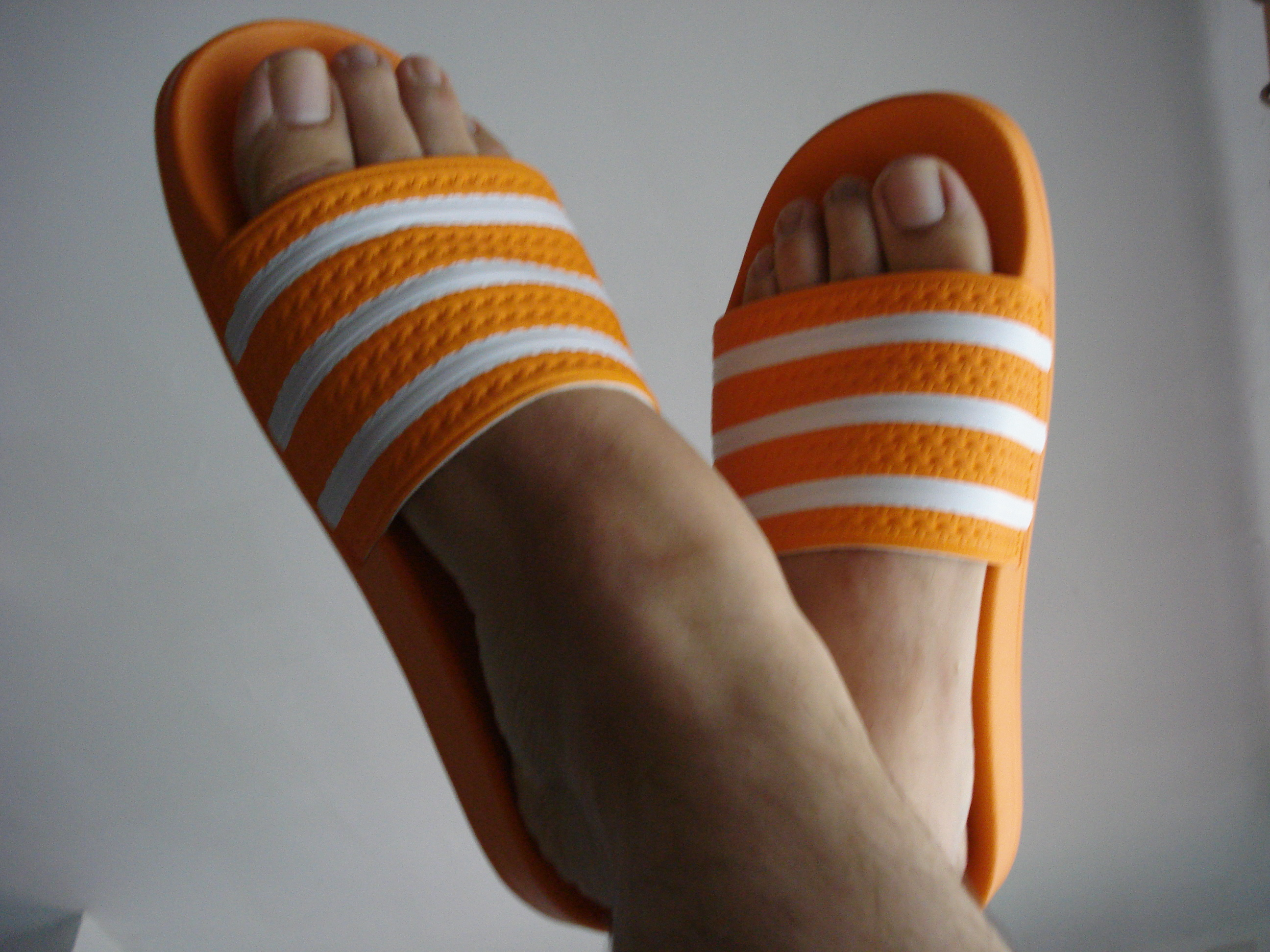
Woman wearing orange slides

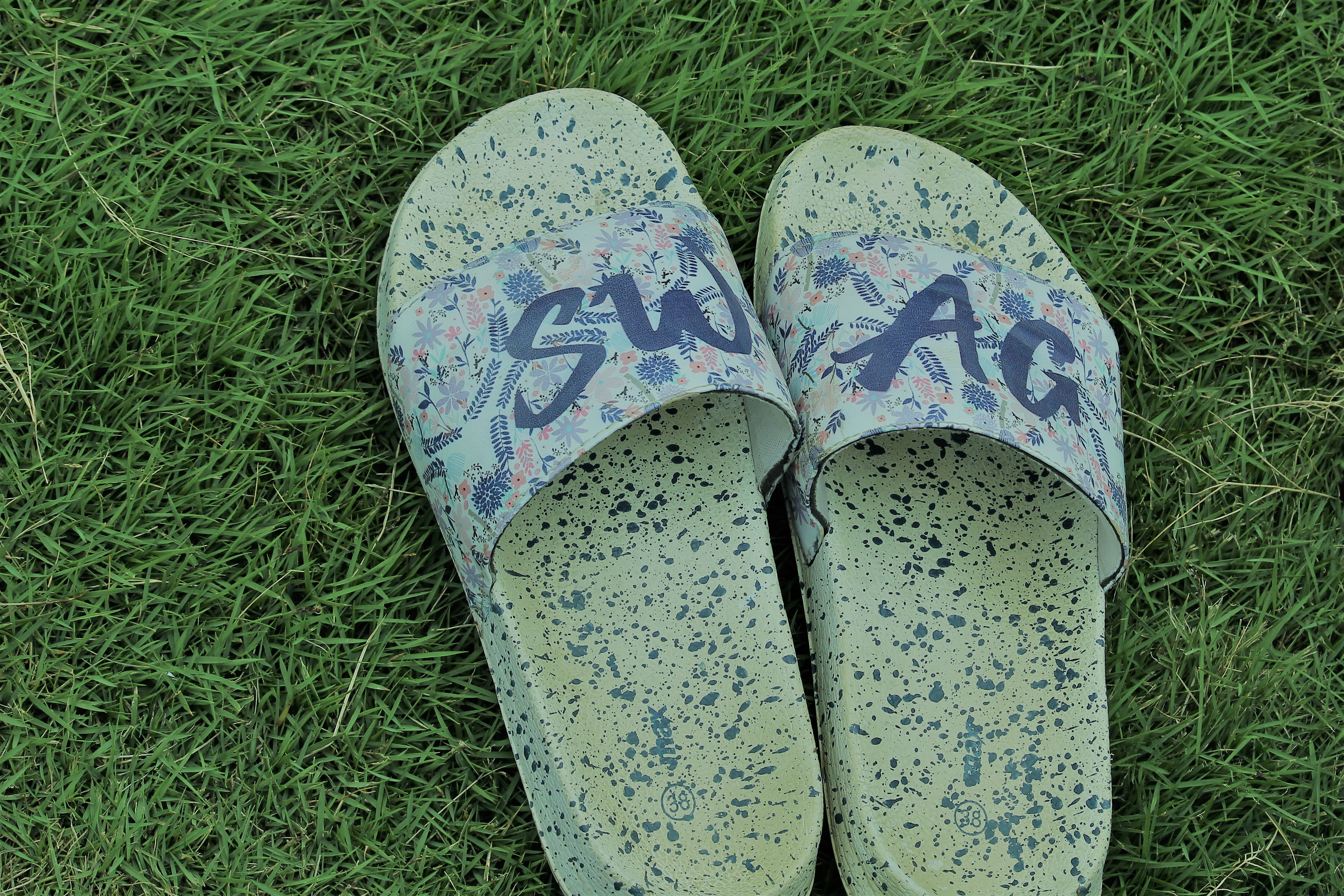
A pair of dotted slides

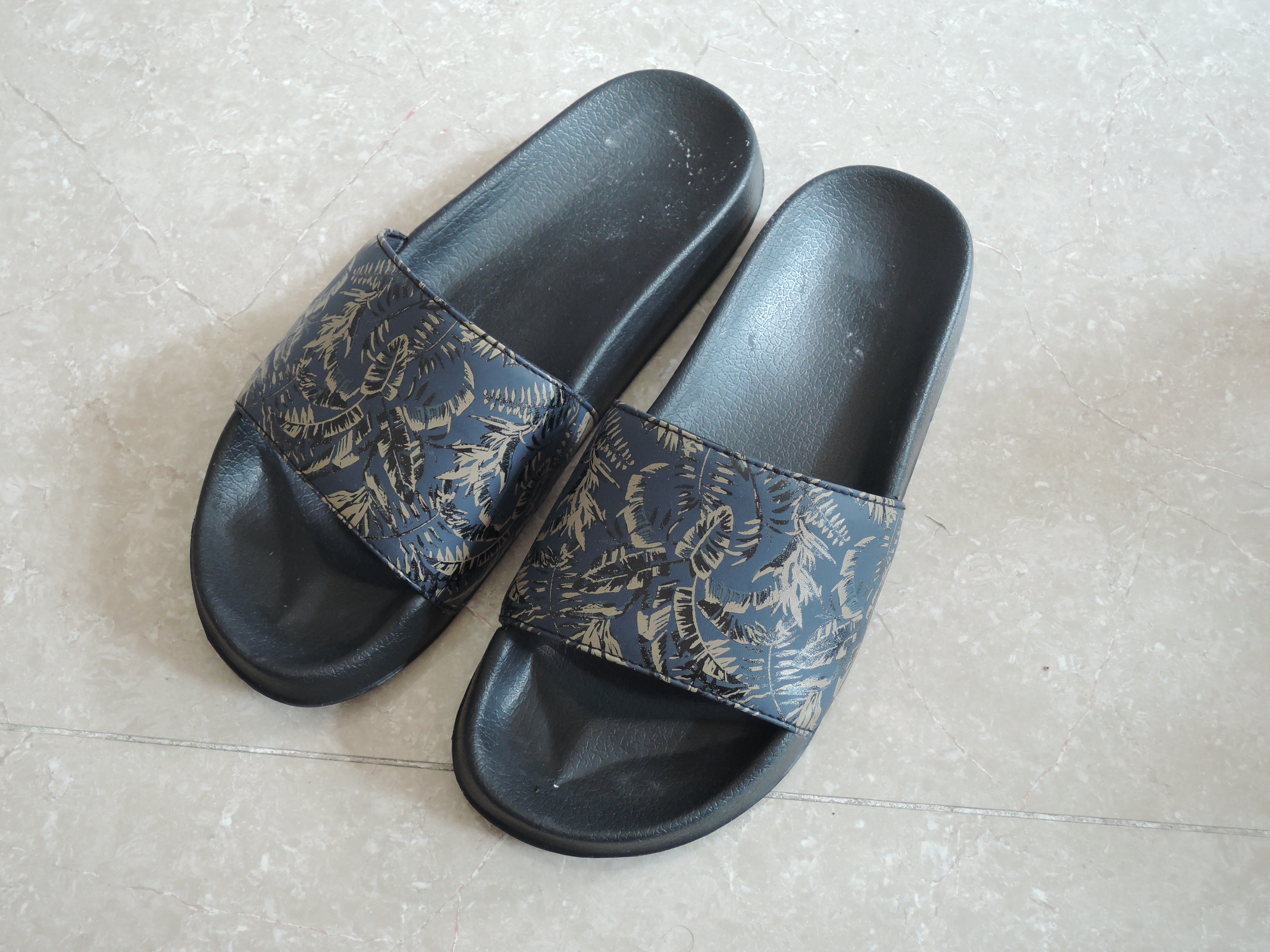
Patterned slides

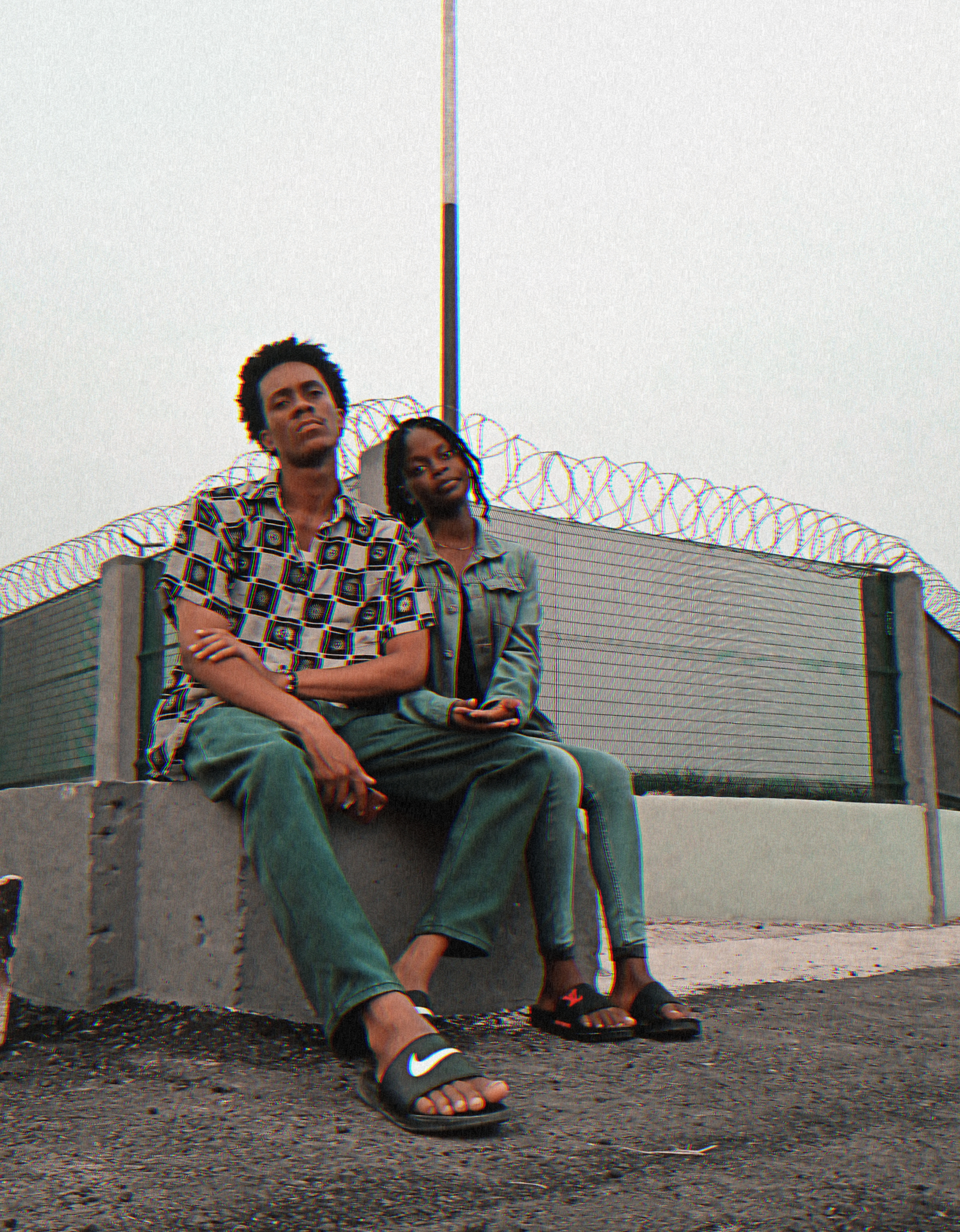
Couple wearing Nike slides

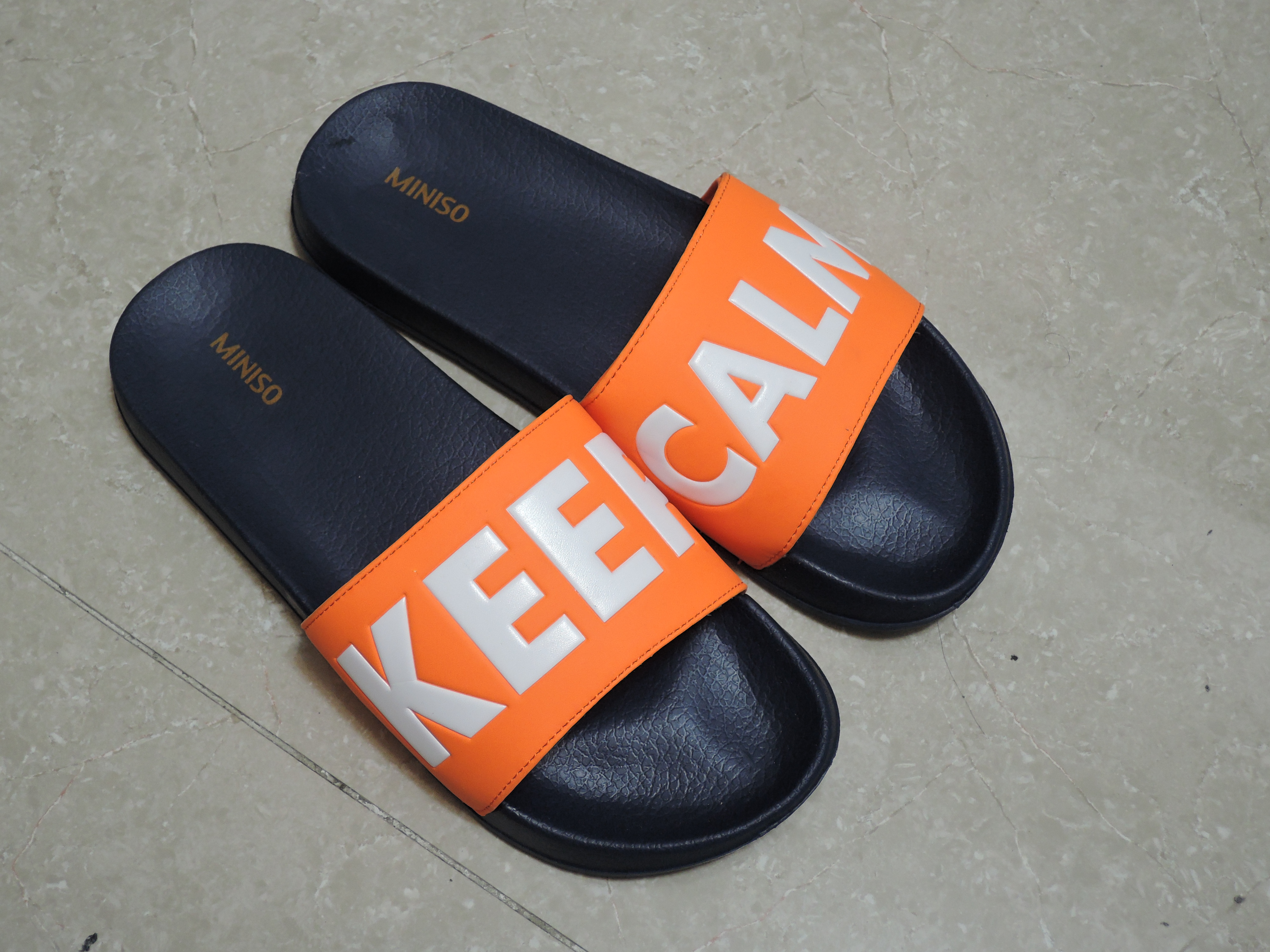
Keep calm slides

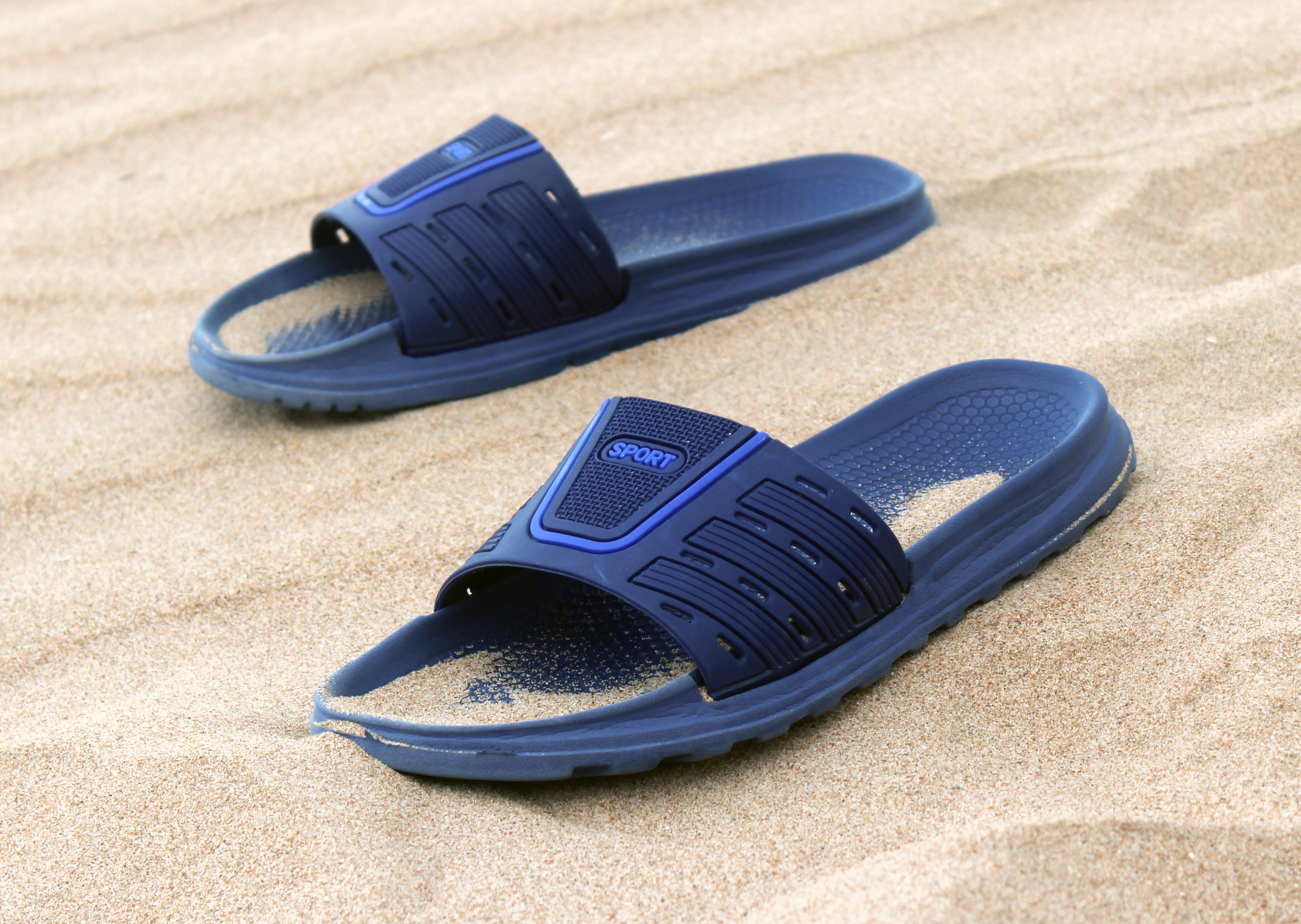
Blue beach slides

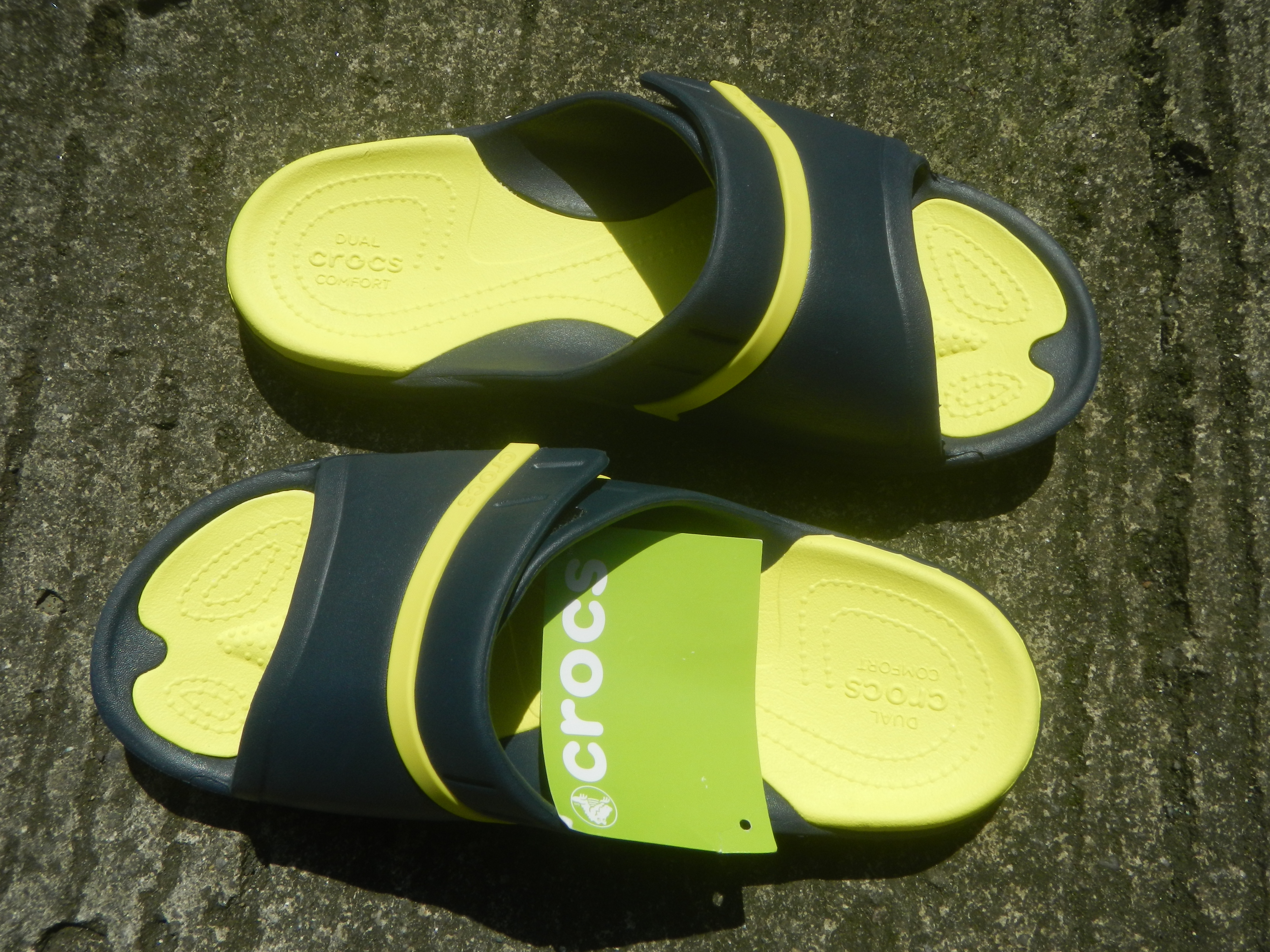
Crocs Slides with label tag

== See also ==
- List of shoe styles
- Flip-flops
- Hnyat-phanat (Burmese)
- Sandal
- Slipper
