= AdiPure =

Range of football boots by Adidas

- Type: Football boot
- Inventor: Adidas
- Inception: 2007
- Manufacturer: Adidas
- Last production year: 2015; 11 years ago

AdiPure (stylized as adiPURE) was a range of football boots developed by the German sportswear manufacturer Adidas and introduced at the end of 2007. The company based the design of AdiPure on its own boots from the 1978 World Cup. In order to remain practical for the modern game, the boot's construction included updated materials and improved manufacturing techniques, to create a product significantly lighter than its 1978 counterpart.

For the 2010 FIFA World Cup, Adidas released AdiPure in a black/sun colourway in honour of the tournament's host nation, South Africa. In 2015, AdiPure was discontinued.

== Models ==
=== AdiPure (2008) ===
Players using AdiPure

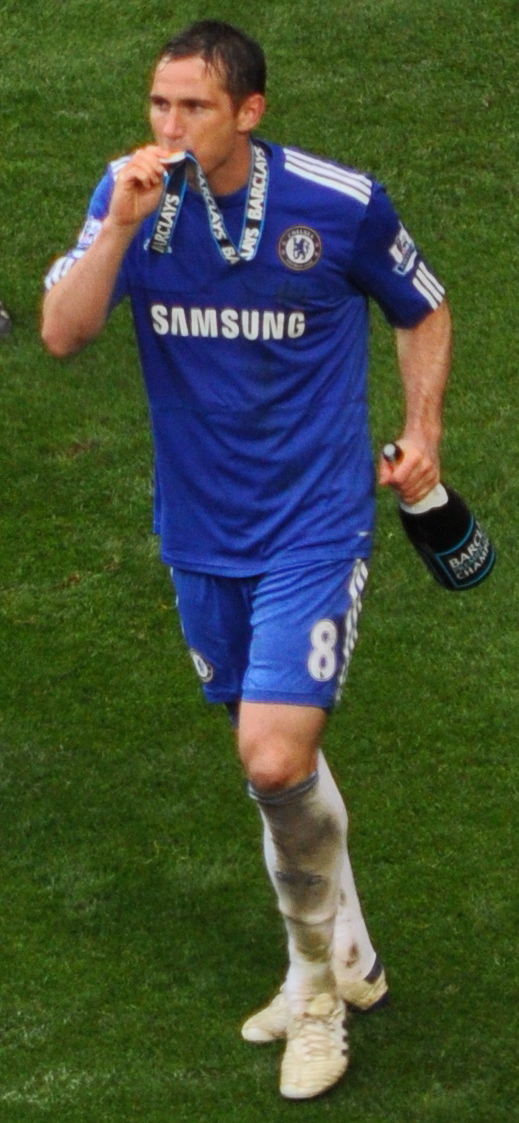
Frank Lampard wearing the AdiPure III in 2010

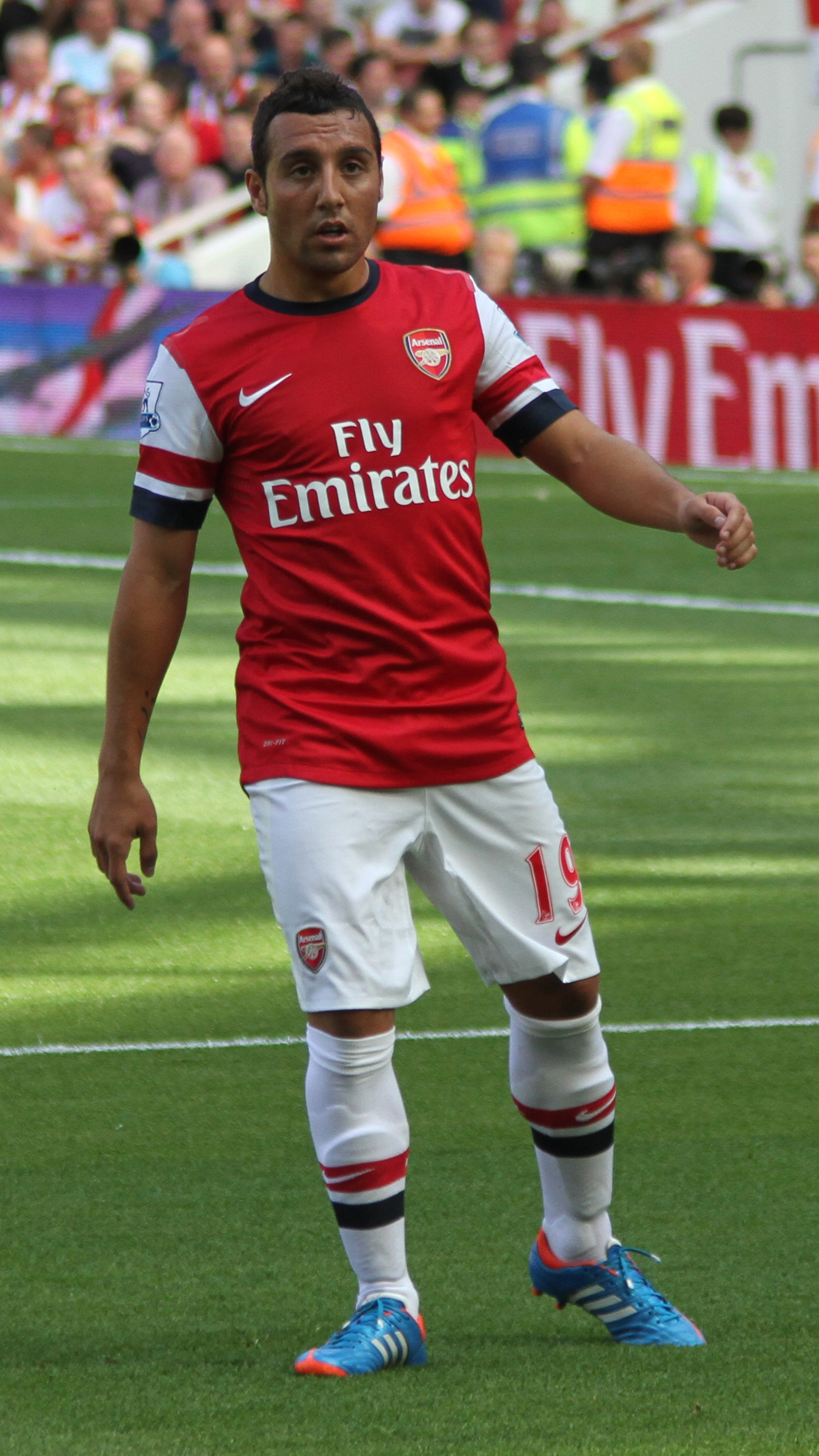
Santi Cazorla wearing the AdiPure 11pro in 2012

The original AdiPure was available at launch in both the traditional black/white and a white/black colourway, these were later followed by blue/white and silver/black colourways. The boots were constructed using high quality k-leather and displayed many design features similar to Adidas' World Cup 1978 boots, including three lines of stitching on either side of the toe and a short tongue.

=== AdiCore & Telstar II ===
The AdiPure was accompanied by two other, less expensive, boots. AdiCore and Telstar II; these boots were visually very alike, with only subtle aesthetic differences but reduced performance and cheaper materials, such as a full-grain leather upper.

=== AdiPure II (2009) ===
The AdiPure II was again released in White/Black, and Black/White colourways, with the Blackout (all black), Black/Metallic Gold, White/Cardinal and Brown/White colourways being released later. Notable design differences from the original AdiPure included the omission of the three stripes on the instep of the boot, the addition of a contrasting collar and the implementation of an asymmetric lacing system.

=== AdiCore II & AdiNova ===
The second generation of AdiPure was accompanied by another set of lower-end models, with the usual minor cosmetic differences and the use of a full-grain upper. The Telstar name was replaced with AdiNova.

=== AdiPure III (2010) ===
The AdiPure III was also released in Black/White colourway, but this time accompanied by a White/Blue colourway on release. Other colourways later released included White/Gold, Gold/Black, Black/Sun, Blue Beauty/White, White/Black/Poppy, Black/Warning and White/Warning. Notable design differences from the AdiPure II included the return of the three stripes on the instep of the boot, although noticeably shorter and wider than on the original AdiPure. It also featured an AdiPrene insert in the sole.

=== AdiCore III & AdiNova II ===
Again the cheaper AdiCore and AdiNova variants of the boot were made available with similar differences in pricing and quality.

=== AdiPure IV (2011) ===
Announced 1 December 2010, the AdiPure IV followed the trend of adidas' 2010 range of football boots by undergoing a significant weight reduction verses previous incarnations. As well as being the lightest AdiPure at the time of release, the AdiPure IV was also the first AdiPure boot since the AdiPure I to feature a central lacing system and a tongue separate to the rest of the upper. Adidas also moved the classic three-stripes further towards the toe-end of the boots, giving them a look more reminiscent of the classic adidas boots of the 1950s, like those worn by the Germany national football team in the 1954 World Cup. The AdiPure IV officially launched on 1 January 2011 with two colourways; Black/White/Poppy and White/Black/Fresh Splash. The release of the AdiPure IV marked an increase in price for the range, with the price points of both the FG & SG models increased to £120. A Light Scarlet/White/Black colourway was also made available in early February.

=== AdiPure IV SL (April 2011) ===
The AdiPure IV SL is the lighter counterpart of the AdiPure IV boot (SL standing for "super light".)

=== AdiPure 11pro (2012) ===
The next generation of AdiPure boots were released in February 2012 and were known as the 11pro. An updated look included an engineered ultra thin 360° support saddle for increased stability and compatibility with Adidas' MiCoach system. Somewhat controversially for purists, Adidas transitioned from a K-Leather upper to Taurus leather for the 11pro.

=== AdiPure 11pro SL (2012) ===
The AdiPure 11pro SL was the lighter counterpart of the AdiPure 11pro. Unlike the AdiPure 11pro, it featured a combination of a K-Leather (Kangaroo Leather) toe and a SprintSkin heel, allowing the boot to weigh in at just 180 grams. The boot also featured a SprintFrame outsole, MiCoach and Traxion studs. The AdiPure 11pro SL was released on 1 February 2012 in a Black/Core Energy colorway.

== See also ==
- Adidas Predator range of football boots; adidas' "control" boot.
