= Adidas Championship Football =

1990 video game

- Developer: Ocean Software
- Publisher: Ocean Software
- Platforms: Amstrad CPC, Commodore 64, ZX Spectrum, Amiga
- Release: 1990
- Genre: Sports
- Modes: Single-player, multiplayer

Adidas Championship Football is a soccer video game developed by Ocean Software in 1990. It was released for the Commodore 64, Amstrad CPC, ZX Spectrum, and Amiga. The Amiga version is also known as Adidas Soccer.

== Reception ==
Reception

Award
Publication	Award
Sinclair User	SU Classic

The Spectrum version of the game went to #2 in the UK sales charts, behind Shadow Warriors.
