= Knut (polar bear) =

Polar bear born in captivity at the Berlin Zoological Garden

- Knut in January 2011
- Species: Polar Bear (Ursus maritimus)
- Sex: Male
- Born: 5 December 2006; Berlin Zoological Garden
- Died: 19 March 2011 (aged 4); Berlin Zoological Garden

Knut (German pronunciation: [ˈknuːt]; 5 December 2006 – 19 March 2011) was an orphaned polar bear born in captivity at the Berlin Zoological Garden. Rejected by his mother at birth, he was raised by zookeepers. He was the first polar bear cub to survive past infancy at the Berlin Zoo in more than 30 years. At one time the subject of international controversy, he became a tourist attraction and commercial success. After the German tabloid newspaper Bild ran a quote from an animal rights activist that decried keeping the cub in captivity, fans worldwide rallied in support of his being hand-raised by humans. Children protested outside the zoo, and e-mails and letters expressing sympathy for the cub's life were sent from around the world.

Knut became the center of a mass media phenomenon dubbed "Knutmania" that spanned the globe and spawned toys, media specials, DVDs, and books. Because of this, the cub was largely responsible for a significant increase in revenue, estimated at €5 million, at the Berlin Zoo in 2007. Attendance figures for the year increased by an estimated 30 percent, making it the most profitable year in its 163-year history.

On 19 March 2011, Knut unexpectedly died at the age of four. His death was caused by drowning after he collapsed into his enclosure's pool while suffering from anti-NMDA receptor encephalitis.

== Infancy ==
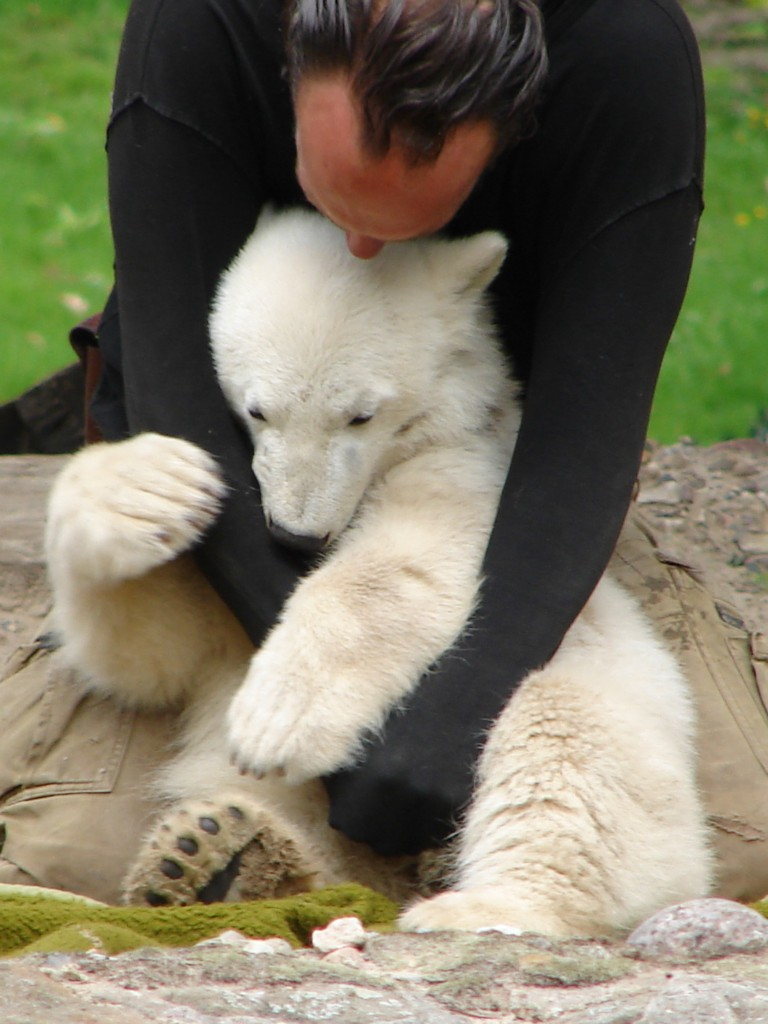
Thomas Dörflein playing with Knut in May 2007

Knut was born at the Berlin Zoo to 20-year-old Tosca, a former circus performer from East Germany who was born in Canada, and her 13-year-old mate Lars, who was originally from the Tierpark Hellabrunn in Munich. After an uncomplicated gestation, Knut and his unnamed brother were born on 5 December 2006. Tosca rejected her cubs for unknown reasons, abandoning them on a rock in the polar bear enclosure. Zookeepers rescued the cubs by scooping them out of the enclosure with an extended fishing net, but Knut's brother died of an infection four days later. Knut was the first polar bear to have been born and survive in the Berlin Zoo in over 30 years. Only the size of a guinea pig, the cub spent the first 44 days of his life in an incubator before zookeeper Thomas Dörflein began raising him.

Knut's need for round-the-clock care required that Dörflein not only sleep on a mattress next to Knut's sleeping crate at night, but also play with, bathe, and feed the cub daily. Knut's diet began with a bottle of baby formula mixed with cod liver oil every two hours, before graduating at the age of four months to a milk porridge mixed with cat food and vitamins. Dörflein also accompanied Knut on his twice-daily one-hour shows for the public and therefore appeared in many videos and photographs alongside the cub. As a result, Dörflein became a minor celebrity in Germany and was awarded Berlin's Medal of Merit in honour of his continuous care for the cub. Dörflein died of a heart attack on 22 September 2008. He was 44 years old.

== Controversy and media coverage ==
In early March 2007, German tabloid Bild-Zeitung carried a quote by animal rights activist Frank Albrecht who said that Knut should have been killed rather than be raised by humans. He declared that the zoo was violating animal protection legislation by keeping him alive. Wolfram Graf-Rudolf, the director of the Aachen Zoo, agreed with Albrecht and stated that the zookeepers "should have had the courage to let the bear die" after it was rejected, arguing that the bear will "die a little" every time it is separated from its caretaker. A group of children protested at the zoo, holding up placards reading "Knut Must Live" and "We Love Knut", and others sent numerous emails and letters asking for the cub's life to be spared. Threatening letters were also sent to Albrecht. The Berlin Zoo rallied in support of the polar bear cub, vowing not to harm him and rejecting the suggestion that it would be kinder to euthanise him.

Albrecht stated his original aim was to draw attention to the law, not to have Knut put down. In December 2006 he had taken legal action against Leipzig Zoo to prevent them from killing a sloth bear cub rejected by its mother. His case was dismissed on the grounds that humans raising the animal would have been against the law of nature. In response to the criticism against him, Albrecht said that he was merely drawing parallels between the two cubs. The publicity from this coverage raised Knut's profile from national to international.

== Debut and first year ==
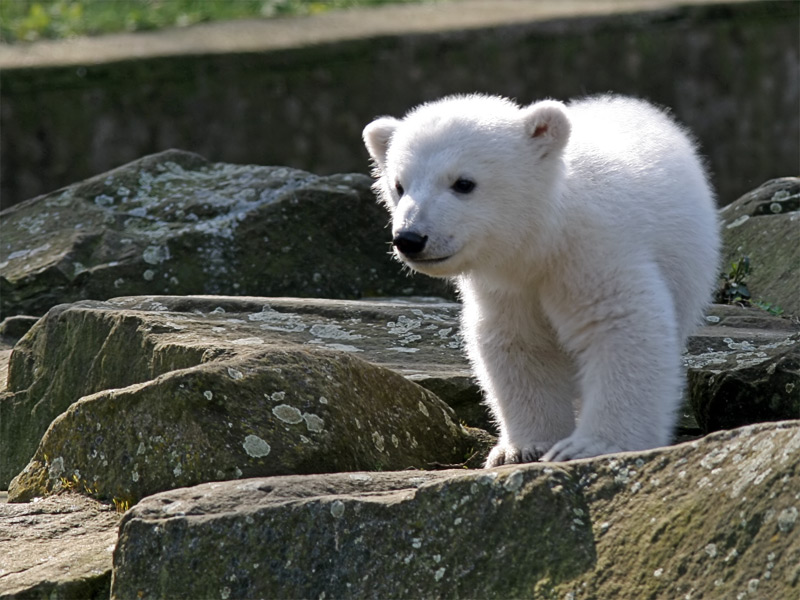
Knut during his debut at the Berlin Zoo in March 2007

On 23 March 2007, Knut was presented to the public for the first time. Around 400 journalists visited the Berlin Zoo on what was dubbed "Knut Day" to report on the cub's first public appearance to a worldwide audience. Because Knut became the focus of worldwide media at a very young age, many stories and false alarms regarding the cub's health and well-being were circulated during his first year. For example, on 16 April 2007, Knut was removed from display due to teething pains resulting from the growth of his right upper canine tooth, but initial reports stated that he was suffering from an unknown illness and subsequently put on antibiotics. Much ado was also made about a death threat that was sent shortly before 15:00 local time on Wednesday 18 April 2007. The zoo had received an anonymous letter by fax which said "Knut ist tot! Donnerstag Mittag." ("Knut is dead! Thursday noon.") In response, the police increased their security measures around the bear. The time frame for the threat passed without incident.

Knut as a 90-kilogram (198 lb) cub on 31 October 2007, six months after his debut

Despite Der Spiegel reporting on 30 April 2007 that Knut was "steadily getting less cute" as he increased in age, Knut continued to bring in record crowds to the zoo that summer. After reaching seven months old and 50 kg (110 lb) in July 2007, Knut's scheduled twice daily public appearances were canceled due to the zoo's concern for the safety of his keeper. Zoo spokeswoman Regine Damm also said it was time for the bear to "associate with other bears and not with other people." After living in the same enclosure as Ernst, a Malaysian black bear cub who was born a month before Knut, and its mother, Knut was then moved to his own private living space. While visitor numbers dwindled from extreme highs in March and April, Knut remained a major attraction at the zoo for the rest of 2007. 400,000 guests were recorded in August 2007, which was an all-time high.

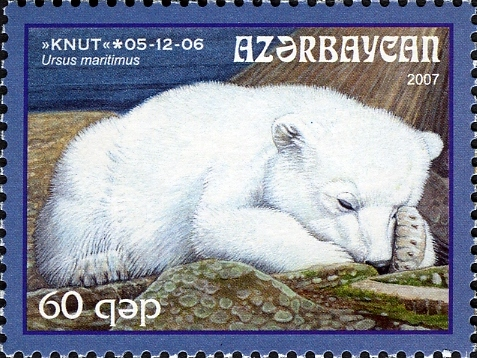
Azerbaijan stamp commemorating the first year of Knut's birth

News of Knut and his life at the zoo was still being reported internationally in late 2007. Knut's restricted diet, intended to curtail the natural weight gain necessary to survive harsh winters, made headlines outside of Germany. His daily meals were reduced in number from four to three, and treats, such as croissants, which were favored by the young polar bear, were restricted. After he hurt his foot while slipping on a wet rock in his enclosure a month later in September, there was an outpouring of concern and support from fans worldwide.

In November 2007 and weighing over 90 kg (198 lb), Knut was deemed too dangerous for close handling and his interaction with human handlers was further diminished. The celebration of the cub's first birthday, which was attended by hundreds of children, was broadcast live on German television. The Berlin mint also produced 250,000 special commemorative silver coins to mark his birthday. Knut's role at the Berlin Zoo was to have included his becoming an "attractive stud" for other zoos in order to help preserve his species. When Flocke was born at the Nuremberg Zoo in December 2007 under similar circumstances, Bild dubbed her Mrs. Knut, suggesting that the two German-born polar bears might become mates when they matured.

== 2008–2010 ==
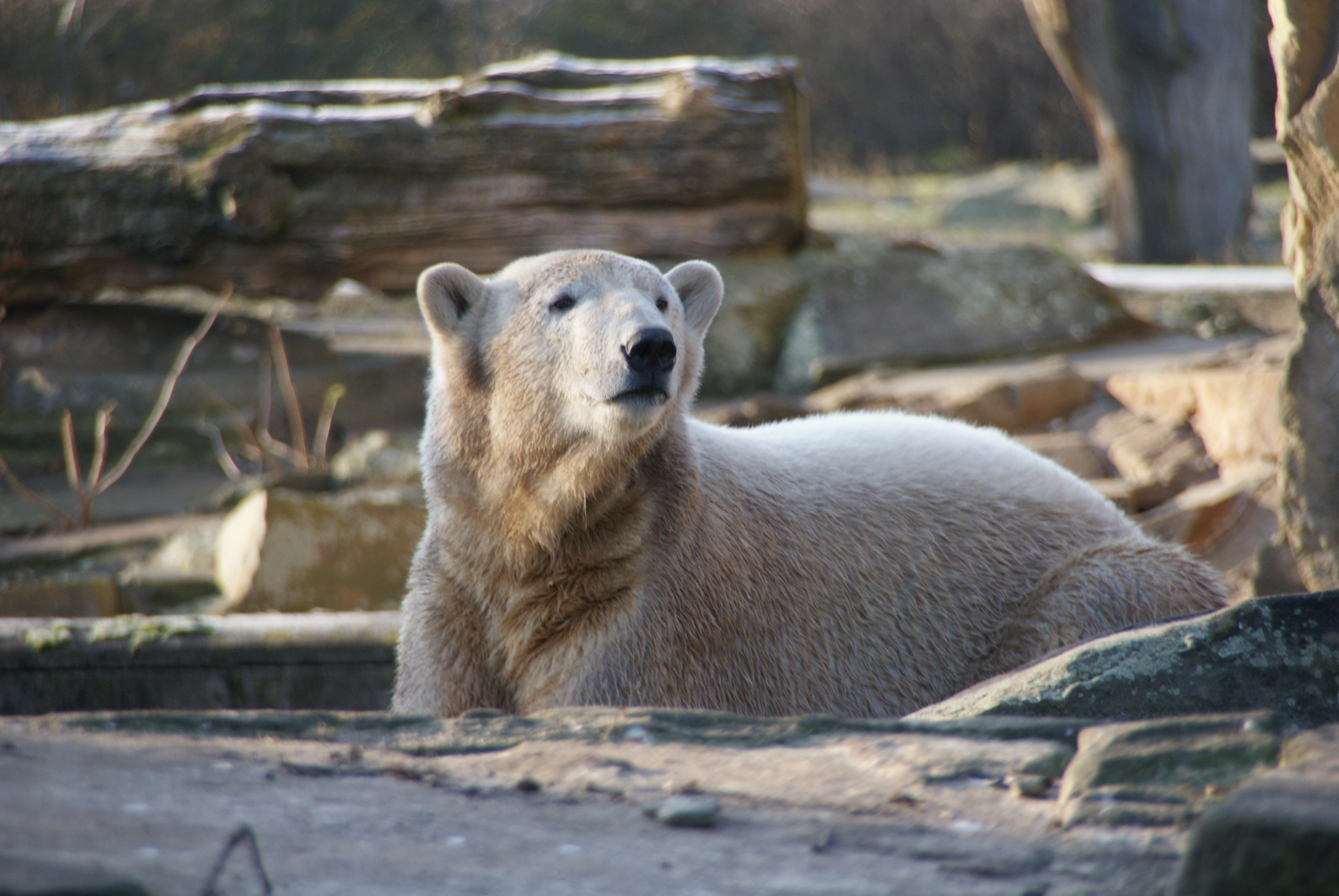
Knut at the age of two years in December 2008

A year after his public debut, Knut was reported as weighing more than 130 kg (286 lb). A plate of six-inch glass, strong enough to resist a mortar blast, was erected between him and zoo visitors. At the end of March 2008, Markus Röbke, one of the keepers who helped rear Knut, reported that the bear should leave the zoo as soon as possible in order to help him acclimate to a life alone. Röbke also said that Knut plainly misses his past father-figure, Thomas Dörflein, and has become so used to attention that he cries when no one is near his enclosure. "Knut needs an audience," Röbke stated. "That has to change". In April, animal welfare campaigners criticized the zoo for allowing Knut to kill and eat ten carp from the moat surrounding his enclosure, saying that it was a breach of German animal protection regulations. The zoo's bear expert, Heiner Klös, however, said that Knut's behavior was "all part of being a polar bear."

In July 2008, it was announced that the Neumünster Zoo in northern Germany, which owns Knut's father, was suing the Berlin Zoo for the profits from Knut's success. Although the Berlin Zoo conceded Neumünster's ownership of Knut due to a previous agreement, it contended that the other zoo has no right to its proceeds. Neumünster had previously tried to negotiate with Berlin Zoo, but later sought a court ruling in their favor. Peter Drüwa, the zoo director at Neumünster, stated that they "do not want to remove Knut from his environment, but we have a right to our request for money." Shortly before Knut's second birthday, reports began circulating that the bear would have to be relocated to another zoo because he was becoming too large for his enclosure. The zoo later released statements that they wish to keep Knut, and the mayor of Berlin, Klaus Wowereit, also declared he wanted the still-adolescent cub to stay in the capital.

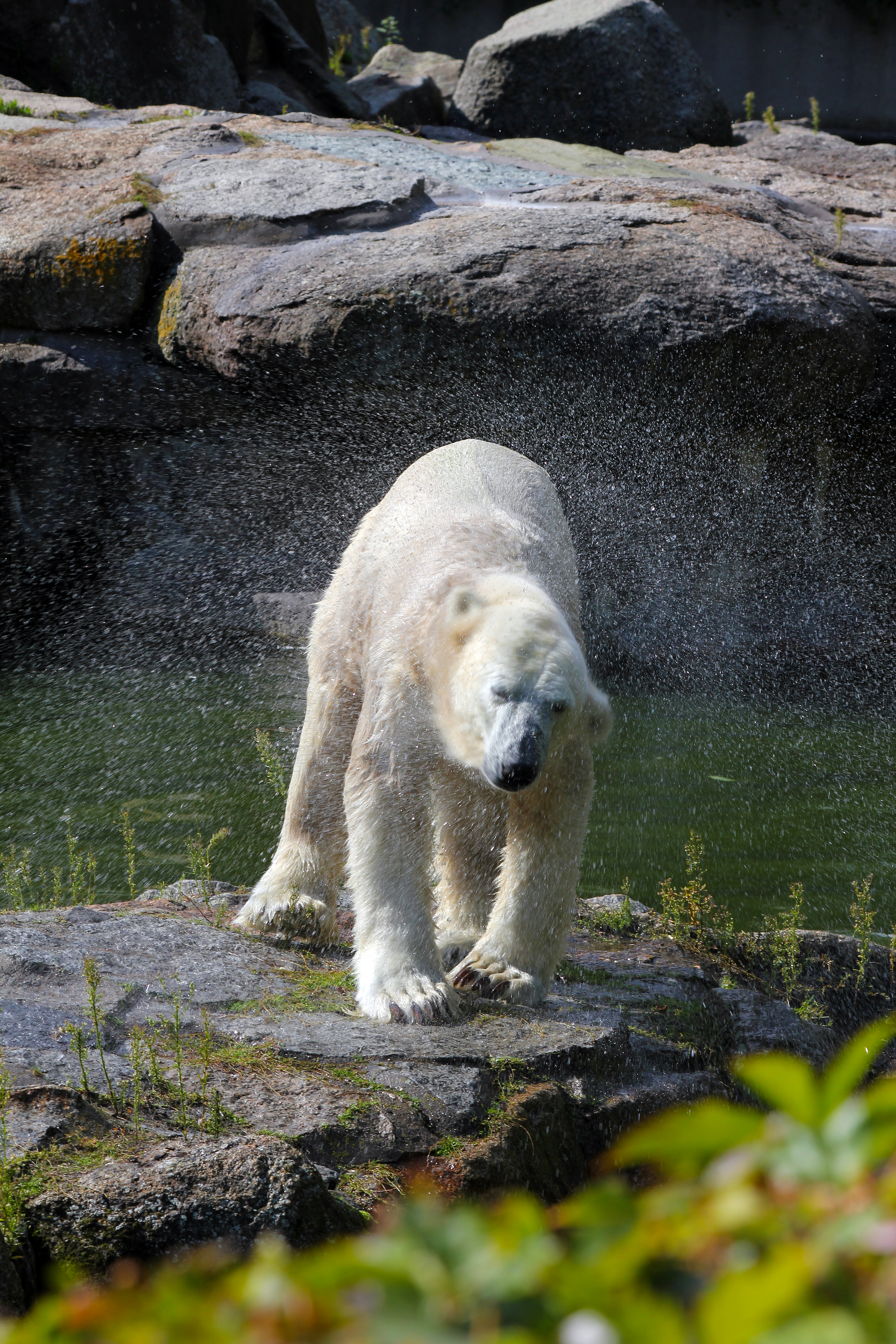
Knut shaking off after a swim in September 2010

Disputes between the two zoos continued into 2009. On 19 May, the Berlin Zoo offered to buy Knut from Neumünster and therefore negate their financial claim on the two-year-old polar bear. Although Neumünster Zoo set a price of €700,000, the Berlin Zoo stated that they would not pay "a cent more" than €350,000 ($488,145). On 8 July, the Berlin Zoo agreed to pay €430,000 ($599,721) to keep Knut in Berlin.

Giovanna, a female polar bear roughly the same age as Knut, was relocated to Berlin from Munich's Hellabrunn Animal Garden in September 2009. She was presented to the public on 23 September, and was due to briefly share Knut's enclosure while her regular home in Munich underwent repairs. Her arrival sparked international interest, as many sources mused that the two bears (although sexually immature) would soon be "dating". However, in March 2010, the German chapter of People for the Ethical Treatment of Animals called for Knut to be castrated in order to avoid inbreeding; he and Giovanna share a grandfather and, according to PETA spokesman Frank Albrecht, the same animal rights activist who spoke out about Knut's handraising three years earlier, their offspring would threaten the genetic diversity of the German polar bear population. The Berlin Zoo declined to comment on the matter, only noting that Giovanna's stay in Berlin was still temporary. In August 2010, Giovanna was moved back to Munich after repairs on her enclosure were completed.

Until his death, Knut shared an enclosure with three female polar bears: Nancy, Katjuscha and his mother Tosca. The older bears were reportedly aggressive towards the young male bear, causing news reports in late 2010 to question whether Knut was being bullied. One of the zookeepers disagreed, stating publicly that "For the time being, Knut is not yet an adult male and doesn't yet know how to get respect like his father did. But day by day, he is imposing himself and with time, this type of problem will go away."

== Death ==
On 19 March 2011, at the age of four, Knut collapsed and died in his enclosure. Witnesses reported that after the bear's rear left leg began shaking; he became agitated before convulsing several times and falling backwards into the pool. Approximately 600 to 700 zoo visitors witnessed Knut's death. A statement made on 22 March in relation to the necropsy reported there were "significant changes in the brain, which may be regarded as a reason for the sudden death". Animal welfare organizations in Germany initially accused the Berlin Zoo of negligence, claiming that Knut died of stress caused by being forced to share his enclosure with three female polar bears. The zoo denied such claims. Bear curator Heiner Klös stated they "did everything to look after Knut—it's normal for polar bears to live with other polar bears in a zoo, and the idea was that Knut should learn social behavior and other skills from the older females ... He played with the other bears, he was relaxed and strong."

On 1 April, pathology experts announced that Knut's immediate cause of death was from drowning. The bear's apparent seizure was due to his suffering from encephalitis, a swelling of the brain likely triggered by an infection. It is unknown what infection caused the swelling, but pathologists believe it was a virus. Although Knut showed no symptoms of being ill, pathologists believe that "this suspected infection must already have been there for a long time ... at least several weeks, possibly months."

Knut's sudden death caused an international outpouring of grief. Hundreds of fans visited the zoo after the bear's death, leaving flowers and mementos near the enclosure. The mayor of Berlin, Klaus Wowereit, stated "We all held him so dearly. He was the star of the Berlin zoos."

In January 2014, Knut's full necropsy results were published by the Leibniz Institute for Zoo and Wildlife Research in the Journal of Comparative Pathology. It was the most in-depth post-mortem ever carried out on an animal. The necropsy revealed that the damage to the bear's brain was so severe that even if he had not fallen into the water and drowned he would have died anyway. Experts hypothesized that he was suffering from encephalitis caused by a virus.

In August 2015, it was discovered that Knut died of anti-NMDA receptor encephalitis.

== Memorialization ==
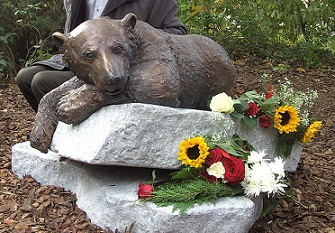
Memorial "Knut the Dreamer" in the zoo Zoologischer Garten Berlin (bronze and granite), sculptor Josef Tabachnyk

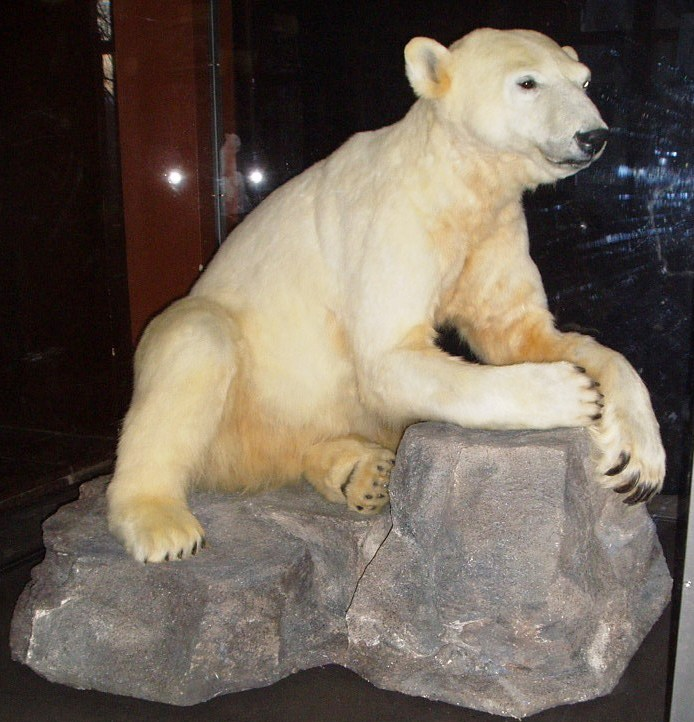
Knut's remains on display in the Museum of Natural History, March 2013

The zoo made plans to erect a monument in Knut's honour, financed by donations from fans. Thomas Ziolko, the chairman of the Friends of the Berlin Zoo, was quoted as saying "Knut will live on in the hearts of many visitors, but it's important to create a memorial for coming generations to preserve the memory of this unique animal personality." On 24 October 2012, the Berlin Zoo unveiled a bronze sculpture by Ukrainian artist Josef Tabachnyk. "Knut – The Dreamer" shows the bear "stretching out dreamily on a rock".

Knut's remains were exhibited in Berlin's Museum of Natural History, although this decision has caused some controversy with fans. A full-sized sculpture covered in Knut's pelt was presented to the public on 16 February 2013. It went on display in the entrance hall of the museum where it was viewed free of charge until 5 May. It will later be used for an exhibition on climate change and environment protection. Museum spokeswoman Gesine Steiner stated that "It's important to make clear we haven't had Knut stuffed. It is an artistically valuable sculpture with the original fur."

From 13 June until 1 September 2013, Knut went on display in the Naturalis Biodiversity Center, the Dutch national museum of natural history in Leiden, Netherlands.

Knut returned to Berlin's Museum of Natural History on 28 July 2014 as an exhibit for a special exhibition on "Highlights of Taxidermy". The museum has won world championship prizes for taxidermy and Knut's remains will be the highlight of this exhibition for years to come.

== Effects of popularity ==
=== Commercial success ===
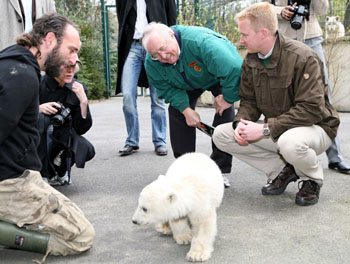
Knut with Dörflein and US Ambassador to Germany William R. Timken in April 2007

The Berlin Zoo registered "Knut" as a trademark in late March 2007. As a result, its shares more than doubled at the Berlin Stock Exchange; previously worth around €2,000, the value closed at €4,820 just a week later. The zoo reported that its attendance figures for 2007 increased by an estimated 30 percent, making it the most profitable it had been in its 163-year history. Knut earned the Berlin Zoo nearly €5 million that year, mainly thanks to an increase in visitors as well as the amount of merchandise sold.

Various companies profited from the attention surrounding Knut by developing themed merchandise such as ringtones and stuffed toys. Plush toy company Steiff produced several Knut-based plush toys in three sizes and models: sitting, standing, and lying down. The first 2,400 produced toys, which were sold exclusively at Berlin Zoo, sold out in only four days. The money raised from the Steiff deal was intended to be used to renovate the polar bear enclosure at the zoo. Candy company Haribo released a raspberry-flavored gummy bear sweet called Cuddly Knut beginning in April 2007. They pledged to donate ten cents to the zoo for every tub of Knut sweets it sold. The gummy bears sold so well that the Bonn-based company had to expand production to a second factory to deal with demand.

Knut was the subject of several popular songs in Germany, the most successful of which were the singles "Knut is Cute" and "Knut, der kleine Eisbär" (English: "Knut, the little polar bear") by nine-year-old Kitty from Köpenick. In the United Kingdom, comedian Mitch Benn performed four songs about Knut for the BBC Radio 4 satirical series The Now Show: "The Baby Bear Must DIE!", "Knut Isn't Cute Anymore", "Goodbye Knut" and "Panda in Berlin". A blog with updates about the polar bear was maintained by a journalist at regional public broadcaster Rundfunk Berlin-Brandenburg; it was available in German, English, and Spanish. RBB was also responsible for a weekly television program dedicated to the polar bear cub that was broadcast in Germany. Knut has also been the subject of several DVDs, including one entitled "Knut – Stories from a Polar Bear's Nursery". On 29 March 2007 he appeared on the cover of the German Vanity Fair magazine, which included a several page spread about the cub's life.

On 1 May 2007, it was announced that New York-based Turtle Pond Publications and Berlin Zoo had signed a deal for the worldwide publishing rights to Knut with the hopes of raising awareness of global warming issues. Written by Craig Hatkoff and his daughters Juliana and Isabella, the 44-page book entitled Knut, der kleine Eisbärenjunge (Little Polar Bear Knut) includes Knut's life story as well as previously unpublished photographs. Although several books about Knut had already been published in Germany, this book was the first to be authorized by the Berlin Zoo.

The book was published in Germany by Ravensburger on 26 July 2007. US publishing house Scholastic released the English version, entitled Knut: How one little polar bear captivated the world, in the United States in November of the same year. Rights to the book have also been sold to publishers in Japan, England, Mexico, China, and Italy.

On 31 December 2007, the zoo's director confirmed the zoo had received a proposal for a film deal from Hollywood film producer Ash R. Shah, whose films include Supernova and Shark Bait, to make an animated film about the bear's life. Shah reportedly approached the Berlin Zoo with a purported €3.5 million film deal. Knut made his big screen debut in the German film Knut und seine Freunde (Knut and His Friends), which premiered in Berlin on 2 March 2008. Directed by Michael Johnson, the film depicts how Knut was rescued after his mother abandoned him and also features a polar bear family from the Arctic and two brown bear cubs from Belarus.

=== Environmental causes ===
Dr. Gerald Uhlich, of the Berlin zoo's board of trustees, stated that because of his vast popularity, Knut had become a means of communication and that he had the ability to "draw attention to the environment in a nice way. Not in a threatening, scolding way." As a result, the German Environment Minister Sigmar Gabriel officially adopted Knut as the mascot for a conference on endangered species to be held in Bonn in 2008. The minister met with Knut soon after his zoo debut, commenting that although Knut was in safe hands, "worldwide polar bears are in danger and if Knut can help the cause, then that is a good thing."

Photographer Annie Leibovitz took pictures of Knut that were used for an environmental campaign, including Vanity Fair magazine's May 2007 Green Issue in which he was superimposed into a photograph with American actor Leonardo DiCaprio. The polar bear has also been depicted on the logo for the German Environment Minister's campaign to help stop global warming and a 2008 special issue stamp. Officially released on 9 April, the stamp shows the roughly one-year-old Knut with the slogan "Natur weltweit bewahren" ("Preserve nature worldwide").

== See also ==
- List of individual bears
