= Brain on Fire (film) =

- Theatrical release poster
- Directed by: Gerard Barrett
- Screenplay by: Gerard Barrett
- Based on: Brain on Fire: My Month of Madness by Susannah Cahalan
- Produced by: A.J. Dix; Beth Kono; Rob Merilees; Lindsay Macadam; Charlize Theron
- Starring: Chloë Grace Moretz; Jenny Slate; Thomas Mann; Tyler Perry; Carrie-Anne Moss; Richard Armitage
- Cinematography: Yaron Orbach
- Edited by: JC Bond
- Music by: John Paesano
- Production companies: Broad Green Pictures; Foundation Features; Denver and Delilah Films; Irish Film Board
- Distributed by: Netflix
- Release dates: September 14, 2016 (TIFF); June 22, 2018 (United States)
- Running time: 89 minutes
- Countries: Canada; Ireland; United States
- Language: English

Brain on Fire is a 2016 biographical drama film directed and written by Irish filmmaker Gerard Barrett. The film is based on Susannah Cahalan's memoir Brain on Fire: My Month of Madness and stars Chloë Grace Moretz, Jenny Slate, Thomas Mann, Tyler Perry, Carrie-Anne Moss, and Richard Armitage.

The film follows the true story of New York Post writer Cahalan, who begins to experience a mysterious illness. After being evaluated extensively by many doctors, she was diagnosed with psychosis. If not for the efforts and skills of Syrian-American neurologist Souhel Najjar, she would have been committed to the psychiatric ward in a hospital and may have died of encephalitis. He sympathized with her case and was able to diagnose and treat her rare illness.

The film was an international co-production between Canada, Ireland & United States. Principal photography began on July 13, 2015, in Vancouver, British Columbia. It had its world premiere at the Toronto International Film Festival on September 14, 2016. The film was released on Netflix on June 22, 2018 but later removed in June 2025.

== Plot ==
Twenty-four-year-old Susannah Cahalan is a writer for The New York Post who lives with her new boyfriend Stephen. Susannah becomes ill suddenly, initially showing symptoms of a common flu like a cough and fatigue, but later begins presenting strange behaviour while in a trance state, such as hearing people say things they have not said and hypersensitivity to loud noises.

Over time, her behaviour becomes more and more erratic. Finally, Susannah has a seizure and seeks medical treatment. The doctor consulted is adamant it is down to Susannah partying too much, working too hard and not getting enough sleep. She moves in with her mother Rhona and, after an emotional outburst, has another seizure, and is taken to a clinic where she undergoes an MRI. Susannah also believes she may have bipolar disorder due to her severe mood changes.

Rhona struggles to care for Susannah. Susannah moves in with her father Tom and his fiancée. During dinner one night, she becomes violent towards them while having another outburst, and her parents demand she is hospitalized despite the MRI, EEG, and all other tests showing normal results. There, one of the doctors informs Susannah's parents she could have schizophrenia, and says that if her behavior does not improve, she will be transferred to a psychiatric hospital.

Susannah gradually becomes semi-catatonic, and one of her attending physicians reaches out to Dr. Souhel Najjar to assist in investigating her case. He has Susannah draw a clock; she draws it with all of the numbers (1–12) on the right side of the face, leading him to believe that the right hemisphere of her brain is swollen and inflamed. Najjar has her undergo a brain biopsy for testing. Following the biopsy, it is found that Susannah has a rare disease called anti-NMDA receptor encephalitis, a brain inflammation, which Najjar describes as "a brain on fire". Najjar begins treatment, which leads to a slow but full recovery of her cognitive abilities.

Seven months later, Susannah is back at work. She presents her first written piece since her recovery to her boss Richard. It is well received, and he asks her to start writing a book about her experience, which she later titles Brain on Fire. Closing text on screen: Susannah Cahalan was the 217th person to be diagnosed with anti-NMDA receptor encephalitis, but her memoir has helped people all over the world, leading to thousands being diagnosed and treated since. She and Dr. Najjar remain close friends.

== Cast ==
- Chloë Grace Moretz as Susannah Cahalan, a 21-year-old woman who one day wakes up in restraints in a hospital a month after having a mysterious illness that doctors are unable to diagnose
- Jenny Slate as Margo, a friend and co-worker
- Thomas Mann as Stephen, Cahalan's boyfriend
- Tyler Perry as Richard, Cahalan's boss at the New York Post
- Carrie-Anne Moss as Rhona Nack, Cahalan's mother
- Richard Armitage as Tom Cahalan, Cahalan's father
- Navid Negahban as Dr. Souhel Najjar
- Alex Zahara as Allen
- Jenn MacLean-Angus as Giselle
- Janet Kidder as Dr. Siskin

== Production ==
On May 1, 2014, Deadline reported that Charlize Theron had acquired the film rights to Susannah Cahalan's 2012 memoir Brain on Fire: My Month of Madness. Dakota Fanning was set to play Cahalan, a young woman who one day wakes up in a hospital with no memory of the events of the previous month. Theron would produce along with Beth Kono and A.J. Dix through her banner Denver and Delilah Productions.

On January 22, 2015, Irish filmmaker Gerard Barrett was set to write and direct the adaptation, while Rob Merilees of Foundation Features would produce and finance the film. London-based Mister Smith Entertainment sold the film to international distributors at 2015 Berlin Film Festival. Will Poulter was added to the cast on February 4, 2015, to play Cahalan's boyfriend. On May 26, 2015, Thomas Mann and Jenny Slate were reportedly in talks to join the film, where Mann would play Cahalan's boyfriend, replacing Poulter. On June 26, 2015, it was announced that Fanning had left the project due to scheduling issues, and Chloë Grace Moretz replaced her for the lead role.

On July 7, 2015, it was announced that Broad Green Pictures had come on board to produce and finance the film as well as distribute the film in the United States, while Lindsay Macadam would also produce along with producing partner Merilees. On July 16, 2015, Carrie-Anne Moss and Richard Armitage were cast as Cahalan's parents, Rhona Nack and Tom Cahalan, respectively. On July 20, 2015, Tyler Perry joined the film to play Richard, Cahalan's boss at the New York Post.

=== Filming ===
Principal photography on the film began on July 13, 2015, in Vancouver, British Columbia. Moretz was spotted filming at the Vancouver General Hospital. Production on the film concluded on August 10, 2015.

== Release ==
The film had its world premiere at the Toronto International Film Festival on September 14, 2016. Shortly after, Netflix acquired distribution rights to the film. It was released on June 22, 2018.

== Reception ==
On the review aggregator website Rotten Tomatoes, the film has an approval rating of 13%, based on 16 critics, and an average rating of 4.53/10. On Metacritic, the film has a weighted average score of 34 out of 100, based on five critics, indicating "generally unfavorable" reviews.
