= Souhel Najjar =

Syrian-American neurologist

- سهيل نجار
- Born: Damascus
- Occupations: Neurologist and psychologist

Souhel Najjar (Arabic: سهيل نجار) is a New York-based Syrian-American neurologist considered an expert in the fields of epilepsy and encephalopathy, specifically the treatment of encephalitis, especially the relatively new diagnosis of Anti-NMDA receptor encephalitis.

He rose to fame with his correct diagnosis and successful treatment with Anti-NMDA receptor encephalitis of New York Post journalist Susannah Cahalan who was initially thought to have a mental health illness and she turned this story into a bestseller book, with over 1 million copies sold and translated into over 20 languages, which was then made into an American drama film by Netflix.

Dr. Najjar was selected as a recipient of the 2022 Ellis Island Medal of Honor.

== See also ==
- Susannah Cahalan
- Brain on Fire: My Month of Madness
- Brain on Fire (film)
