= Susannah Cahalan =

American journalist and writer

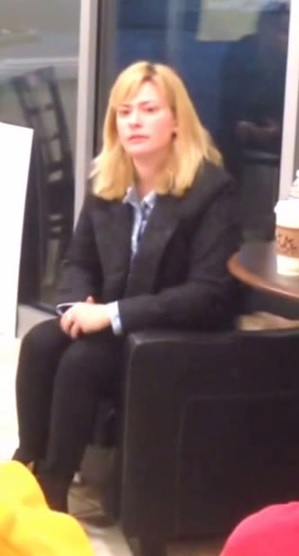
- Cahalan in 2014
- Born: January 30, 1985 (age 41)
- Citizenship: USA
- Education: Washington University in St. Louis
- Occupations: journalist, author
- Notable work: Brain on Fire, The Great Pretender
- Spouse: Stephen Grywalski (m. 2015)
- Children: 2

Susannah Cahalan (born January 30, 1985) is an American writer and author, known for writing the memoir Brain on Fire: My Month of Madness, about her hospitalization with a rare autoimmune disease, anti-NMDA receptor encephalitis. Her second and third books, The Great Pretender: The Undercover Mission That Changed Our Understanding of Madness and The Acid Queen: The Psychedelic Life and Counterculture Rebellion of Rosemary Woodruff Leary, were published in 2019 and 2025, respectively. She also works as a writer for the New York Post. Cahalan's work has raised awareness for her brain disease, making it more well-known.

== Personal life and career ==
Cahalan was a journalist for the New York Post before she became ill, and her editor suggested that she write about her disease and its effect on her. As she recovered from her brain illness, she decided to bring the same journalistic approach to writing her memoir, using fact and research as the foundation for her story. According to Cahalan, it was a "very dissociative process" to write about her experience with the disease. She had to recreate the timeline of everything that happened, gathering different records from the hospital to keep track of what happened and when. Through interviewing those closest to her, she was able to piece together what that month looked like. Overwhelmingly, what she remembered from her disease was the fear and anger that it created within her. Writing her book, she said, felt like regaining control over the body that had controlled her for so long.

Cahalan wrote more articles for the New York Post. She gave a lecture at the opening session of the American Psychiatric Association's 2017 meeting. She presents talks for hospitals and universities to raise awareness about her disease. In 2022, she resided in Brooklyn, New York.

== Anti-NMDA receptor encephalitis ==
=== Disease presentation and misdiagnoses ===
Cahalan's disease manifested in 2009 when she was 24 years old. It began with sensory issues, which she later described in her article "My Mysterious Lost Month of Madness" as experiencing the world “brighter, louder, more painful.” She also began experiencing numbness in the whole left side of her body, and paranoid hallucinations of bed bug bites. Concerned by the numbness, Cahalan sought out a neurologist who ran multiple inconclusive tests, including two normal MRIs. Cahalan began experiencing severe insomnia and continued behavioral abnormalities. One night, at her apartment with her boyfriend, she had a grand mal seizure and woke up in St. Luke's Hospital. Cahalan describes the hospital neurologist as dismissive, and she received her first of multiple misdiagnoses: alcohol withdrawal. Psychiatrists also misdiagnosed her with schizophrenia and bipolar I disorder. Cahalan was released from the hospital, and as her disease worsened, she had another grand mal seizure.

=== Hospital stay ===
After her second seizure, Cahalan's parents took her to the hospital for an EEG and demanded that she not be taken to a psychiatric floor. Unlike many anti-NMDA cases, Cahalan was never admitted to a psychiatric ward. While at the hospital, Cahalan had her third seizure and was immediately placed on the epilepsy floor of New York University's Medical Center. Her hallucinations and delusions soared during the month she spent in the hospital. Cahalan had two lumbar puncture procedures that revealed high white blood cell counts. Because high white blood cells count signify brain swelling, the case was officially passed to neuro-pathologist and epileptologist Dr. Souhel Najjar at NYU medical center.

=== Diagnosis (anti-NMDA receptor encephalitis) ===
Dr. Najjar had Cahalan perform a “clock test", which involves the patient drawing the face of a clock. When Cahalan drew her clock, she was only able to recreate half of it, indicating injury to one side of her brain. After a brain biopsy, it was concluded that Cahalan's issue was not psychiatric, but the result of anti-NMDA encephalitis, a brain-inflammation disease with an unknown cause. She was only the 217th person diagnosed with this illness.

=== Treatment and recovery ===
In order to treat her disease, she was given an assortment of different steroids, infusions, and plasmapheresis. She made a full recovery without suffering long-term brain damage.

== Film adaptation ==
In 2016 Netflix released a feature film based on Brain on Fire. The movie, which shares the title of the book, was directed by Irish filmmaker Gerard Barrett. Chloë Grace Moretz portrays Cahalan in the film, which chronicles the events leading to Cahalan's misdiagnosis, hospitalization, and eventual diagnosis and recovery.

== The Great Pretender ==
External videos
- Q&A interview with Cahalan on The Great Pretender, November 10, 2019, C-SPAN

In 2019, Cahalan's second book was published, The Great Pretender: The Undercover Mission That Changed Our Understanding of Madness. In the work she accuses psychologist David Rosenhan of fabricating the results of seminal research published in the journal Science. Rosenhan's work demonstrated that staff working at psychiatric hospitals, including psychiatrists, could be easily misled to diagnose schizophrenia when individuals were perfectly sane and reported the mistreatment of patients in these facilities. Cahalan was drawn to this study due to her own experiences with being improperly diagnosed with mental illness, but as she researched Rosenhan and his activity, she began to find contradictions in his work that made her question the validity of his experiment.

== Bibliography ==
- Cahalan, Susannah (2012-11-13). Brain on Fire. Simon and Schuster. ISBN 978-1-4516-2137-2.
- Cahalan, Susannah (2019-11-05). The Great Pretender. New York Boston: Grand Central Publishing. ISBN 978-1-5387-1528-4.
- Cahalan, Susannah (2025-04-22). The Acid Queen. New York: Penguin Group. ISBN 978-0-593-49005-1.

== Awards ==
Cahalan has been awarded the Poynter Fellowship in Journalism from Yale University, the Richardson Seminar in the History of Psychiatry from Cornell in 2020, and the Spitzer Memorial lecture from Columbia University in 2020.
