= Kicker =

Kicker or The Kicker may refer to:

== Sports ==
- Placekicker, a position in American and Canadian football
- Kicker (magazine), sports magazine in Germany
- Kicker, the German colloquial term for an association football player
- Kicker, the word used in Belgium, Finland, Germany, and Russia for table football
- Kicker, another name for Kickball
- Flea Kicker, a play executed by the Nebraska Cornhuskers football team
- Nicolás Kicker (born 1992), Argentine tennis player
- Kicker (dominoes), a domino tile that increases the count by one spot
- Kicker, the upward-sloping part of a jump in a ski/snowboard terrain park

=== Association football ===
- BSC Kickers 1900 Berlin from Berlin, Germany
- Kickers Emden from Emden, Lower Saxony, Germany
- Kickers Frankfurt, one of the two teams who formed the actual Eintracht Frankfurt, from Frankfurt am Main, Hesse, Germany
- Kickers Offenbach from Offenbach am Main, Hesse, Germany
- Kickers Würzburg from Würzburg, Bavaria, Germany
- Calgary Kickers from Calgary, Alberta, Canada
- California Kickers from Hollywood, California, United States
- Denver Kickers from Denver, Colorado, United States
- Los Angeles Kickers from Los Angeles, California, United States
- SV Kickers Pforzheim from Pforzheim, Germany
- Potsdamer Kickers from Potsdam, Brandenburg, Germany
- Richmond Kickers from Richmond, Virginia, United States
- St. Petersburg Kickers from St. Petersburg, Florida, United States.
- Stuttgarter Kickers from Stuttgart, Baden-Württemberg, Germany
- Violet Kickers F.C. from Jamaica

== Gambling ==
- Kicker (poker) or side card, a tie breaking card in poker
- "Kicker", an option in the Connecticut Lottery's Cash 5 game
- "The Kicker", an option in the Ohio Lottery's Classic Lotto game

== Music ==
- The Kicker (Bobby Hutcherson album), 1999
- The Kicker (Joe Henderson album), 1967
- Kicker (album), by Zella Day (2015)
- Kicker (EP), by The Get Up Kids (2018)

== Other ==
- Kicker (journalism)
- Kicker (KDE), the taskbar for the K Desktop Environment
- Kicker (Transformers), a Transformers: Energon character
- Kicker Statue, created by sculptor Josef Tabachnyk
- Kickers (brand), a European clothing and footwear brand
- The common name for the Oregon tax rebate
- On a sailboat, the boom vang
- A part of a pinball machine
- Alternative name for the video game Shao-lin's Road
