= Glassland =

- Directed by: Gerard Barrett
- Written by: Gerard Barrett
- Produced by: Juliette Bonass; Ed Guiney
- Starring: Jack Reynor; Toni Collette; Will Poulter
- Cinematography: Piers McGrail
- Edited by: Nathan Nugent
- Production companies: Element Pictures; Irish Film Board
- Release dates: 11 July 2014 (Galway); 17 April 2015
- Running time: 93 minutes
- Country: Ireland
- Language: English

Glassland is a 2014 Irish drama film written and directed by Gerard Barrett in his second feature, following Pilgrim Hill. The film stars Jack Reynor as a young man named John who tries to help his mother Jean (Toni Collette) with her alcoholism.

== Plot ==
John is a cash-strapped taxi driver in Dublin, who lives with his mother, Jean, whose alcoholism has spiraled out of control. He finds her comatose in her own vomit and drives her to the hospital, where she recuperates until her next bout of drunkenness. John juggles trying to find work, spending time with his best friend Shane, arguing with his mother about her alcohol consumption, taxiing sex workers, and palling with his younger brother Kit, who has Down syndrome and lives in a home with other disabled children. John rids his house of alcohol and tries to convince his mother to stop drinking, but she screams at him and smashes dish ware as he impassively videos her rampage.

After fearfully searching around town for his mother, he finds her drunk on their doorstep. Not knowing what else to do with her, he invites her to party with him and watches, emotionless, as she drinks and dances in the kitchen. Jean confides in John that when his younger brother was born disabled, his father left, and that she always saw Kit as less than human and nothing but a drain on her. According to Jean, John was her "precious child," and alcohol was a balm for the loneliness she felt after the loss of her marriage.

John convinces Jean to enter a treatment centre when he admits in anger that he can't tolerate her dysfunction any longer. He shows her the video of her raging for alcohol. The free centre can only keep her for one week, but the concerned director finds a place at a private clinic with a fee of 8,000 euros. Desperate, John calls his boss to ask for an advance, agreeing to do his bidding. John drives Shane to the airport to leave the country, but on the way has arranged for him to have a cathartic meeting with his young son whom he almost never gets to see. John and Shane say tearful goodbyes at the airport.

John visits his mother at the new centre, along with his brother, where they share an emotional moment. John's boss tells him to pick up something delicate for him. He drives to a desolate house where he finds a young woman, abused and delirious in a bathtub. Disturbed and perplexed, he ends up driving her to the director of the treatment centre to get her help.

== Cast ==
- Jack Reynor as John
- Toni Collette as Jean
- Will Poulter as Shane
- Michael Smiley as Jim
- Darine Ní Dhonnchadha as Bridie
- Gary Ó'Nualláin as Frank

== Release ==
Glassland was released theatrically in Ireland and the United Kingdom on 17 April 2015.
