= Willy Brandt Memorial (Nuremberg) =

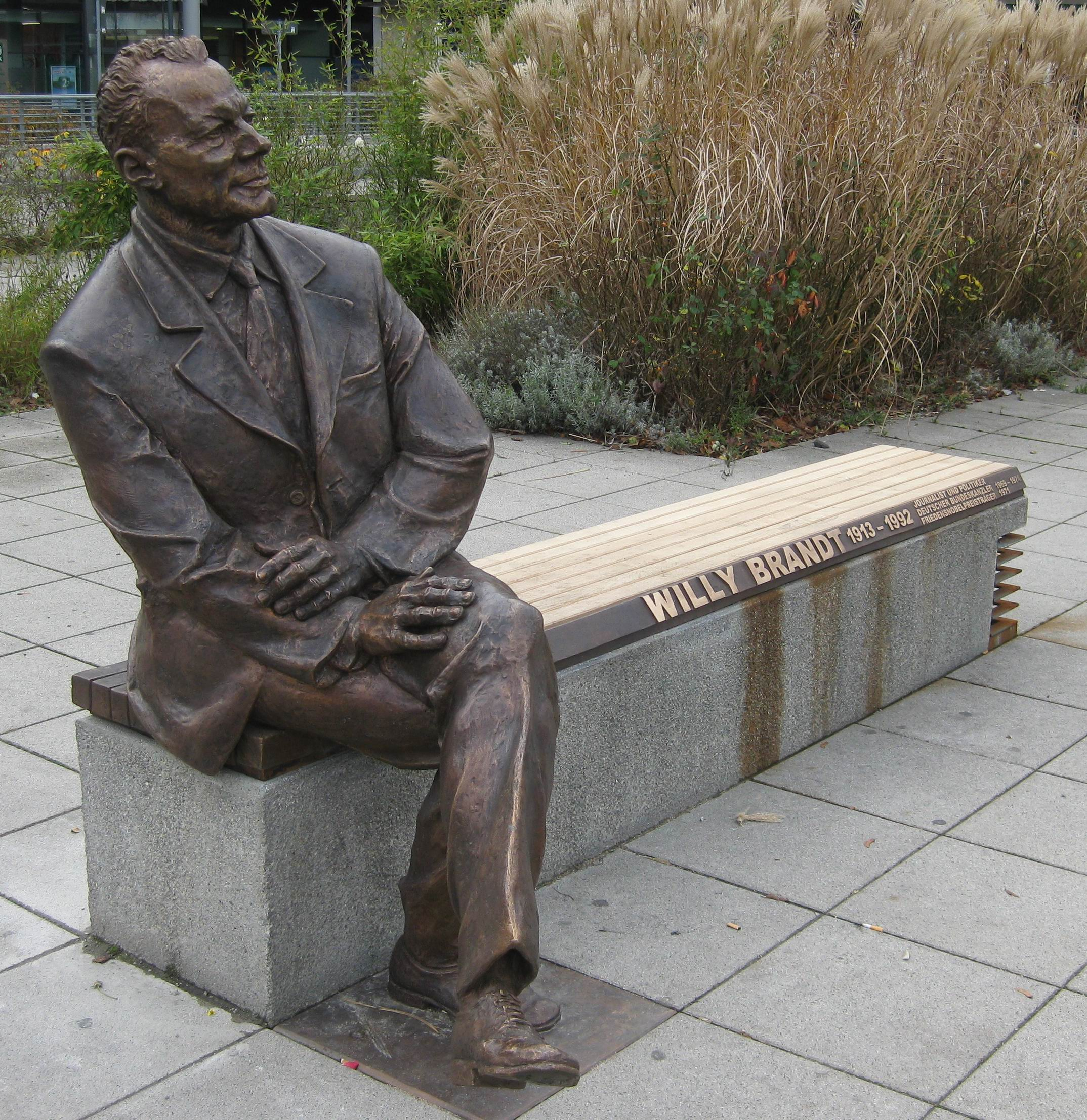
- Artist: Josef Tabachnyk
- Subject: Willy Brandt
- Location: Nuremberg

The Willy Brandt Memorial at the Willy Brandt Place in Nuremberg remembers the former Federal Chancellor and Nobel Peace Prize winner Willy Brandt. The bronze sculpture, which is sitting on a bench, was opened on 9 November 2009 in Anwesenheit by Ulrich Maly, Josef Tabachnyk and numerous contemporaries of Brandt, such as Hans-Jochen Vogel.

Around one year before, on 6 November 2008, the sculptor Josef Tabachnyk won a competition with this memorial. Tabachnyk’s entry won against three other competitors. The Culture Committee of the city of Nuremberg decided to invite a limited number of artists to participate in this competition on 4 June 2008.

The financing of this memorial was achieved through three sponsors, Walter Metz (Initiator), Bruno Schnell (Publisher) and the PSD Bank. The city council of Nuremberg took over the building costs necessary for installing the sculpture at Willy Brandt Place, including costs for the sculpture's foundations.
