= Statue of Adolf Dassler =

Bronze sculpture in Germany

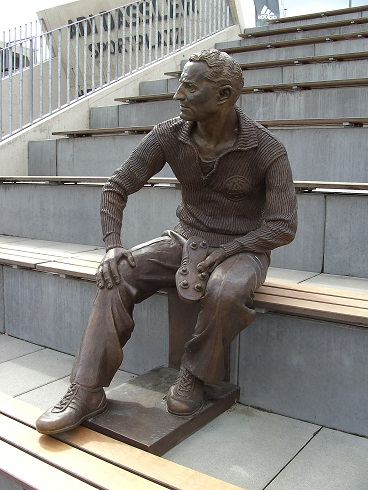
- Sculpture of Adolf Dassler in the Adi-Dassler-Stadion in Herzogenaurach (Germany), by sculptor Josef Tabachnyk, Bronze, 2006
- Artist: Josef Tabachnyk
- Year: 2006
- Medium: Bronze
- Subject: Adolf Dassler
- Location: Adi Dassler stadium, Herzogenaurach

The Statue of Adolf Dassler is a life-size sculpture, which was erected in May 2006 at the Adi Dassler stadium in Herzogenaurach. The sculpture portrays the founder of the sporting goods company Adidas, and was created by sculptor Josef Tabachnyk. The statue sits like a spectator on a stand within the stadium, which is located next to the main entrance of the Adidas headquarters in Herzogenaurach. After the sculpture opening in 2006, the sculpture of its founder has often been used as a symbol for the company and its roots in producing sports shoes in the 1920s.

The life-size, bronze statue was reproduced in various sizes and now also sits at the new flagship Adidas store in New York City, which is the biggest Adidas store worldwide. The opening of the sculpture in New York was on 1 December 2016. Since January 2019 another original of the statue is placed at the entrance to the Adidas-Store at 22 Avenue des Champs-Élysées in Paris.
