= The Memorial for the Victims of Fascism (Schytomyr) =

Ukrainian sculpture

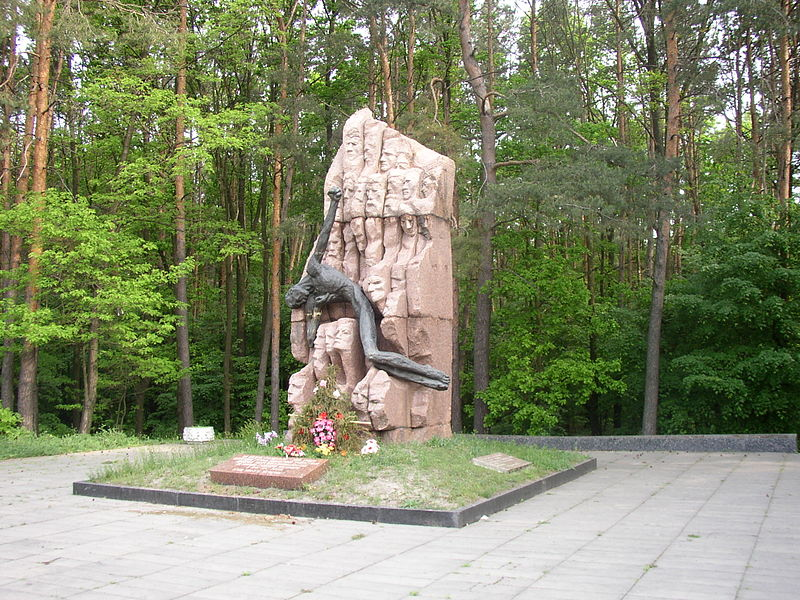
Memorial for the Victims of Fascism by Josef Tabachnyk in Schytomyr, Ukraine

The Memorial for the Victims of Fascism, also called Memorial for the Victims of the Concentration Camps or Memorial for the Victims of Fascism in Bogunskiy-Forrest, was erected in 1996 in the district of Boguniya in the city of Schytomyr in Ukraine. The sculpture's creators are the sculptor Josef Tabachnyk and the architect Peter Biryuk.

== History of the location ==
The memorial is dedicated to the peaceful citizens and prisoners of the Second World War (over 110,000 people) that died in the area, at the outskirts of Schytomyr. The German army's prisoner of war camp "Stalag - 358" was situated in that location from January 1941 to November 1943.

== Memorial components and meaning ==
The monument is a sculptural composition made from bronze and rose coloured granite with a height of 6.5 metres (21 ft). In the middle of the memorial is a bodiless, almost weightless bronze figure, which depicts the spirit of the people, which has lost its matter and has only its courage, strength and invincibility fluttering around in space. Within the stone-cutting, the faces of those who shortly before were people have become eternal and are shown, speaking, asking and screaming.

At the base of the memorial there is a granite plate (1.5 x 0.65m) with the inscription: "This earth, which has seen much suffering, is a witness of the cruelty of the fascist destruction of tens of thousands of prisoners of war and peaceful citizens of Schytomyr from 1941 to 1943. In eternal memory of the deceased."

In 2002 a capsule, containing the remains of the inhabitants of Schytomyr who were tortured to death in KZ Majdanek, was buried. The engraving on it says: "At this place the remains of our countrymen who were tortured to death in Hitler's KZ Majdanek are buried. In eternal memory." At the right of the composition there is a pink granite plate with the inscription "Sculptor J. Tabachnyk and Architect P. Biryuk".
