= Josef Tabachnyk =

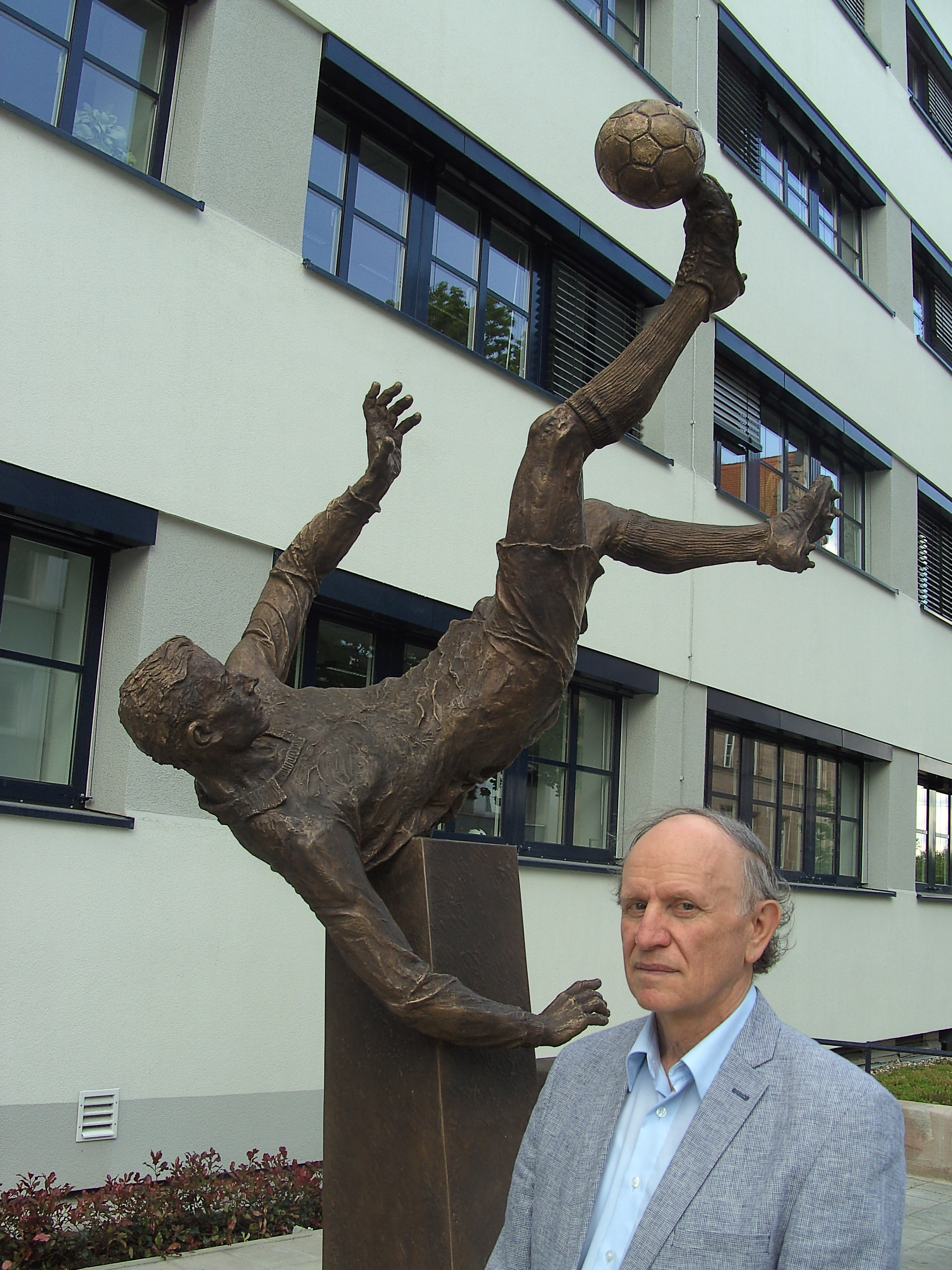
Josef Tabachnyk

Josef Tabachnyk (born 15 July 1947 in Zhytomyr) is an artist living in Nuremberg, who specialises in making bronze sculptures of people, animals and abstract forms. His most famous works include Knut the Dreamer, the Willy-Brandt memorial, a statue of Adolf Dassler as well as memorials for victims of war in Saint Petersburg, Zhytomyr, Novohrad-Volynskyi and Slovechne.

== Biography ==
Tabachnyk was born in Ukraine. From 1970 to 1976 he studied Sculpture and Architecture at the University of Malerie in former Leningrad. He moved with his family in 1997 to Germany and has lived ever since in Nuremberg.

== Famous works ==
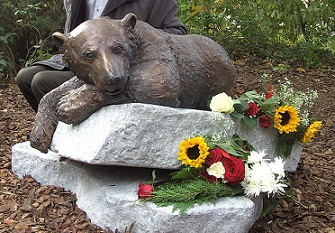
Monument 'Knut the Dreamer' for the polar bear Knut in the Berlin Zoological Garden), made from bronze und granit.

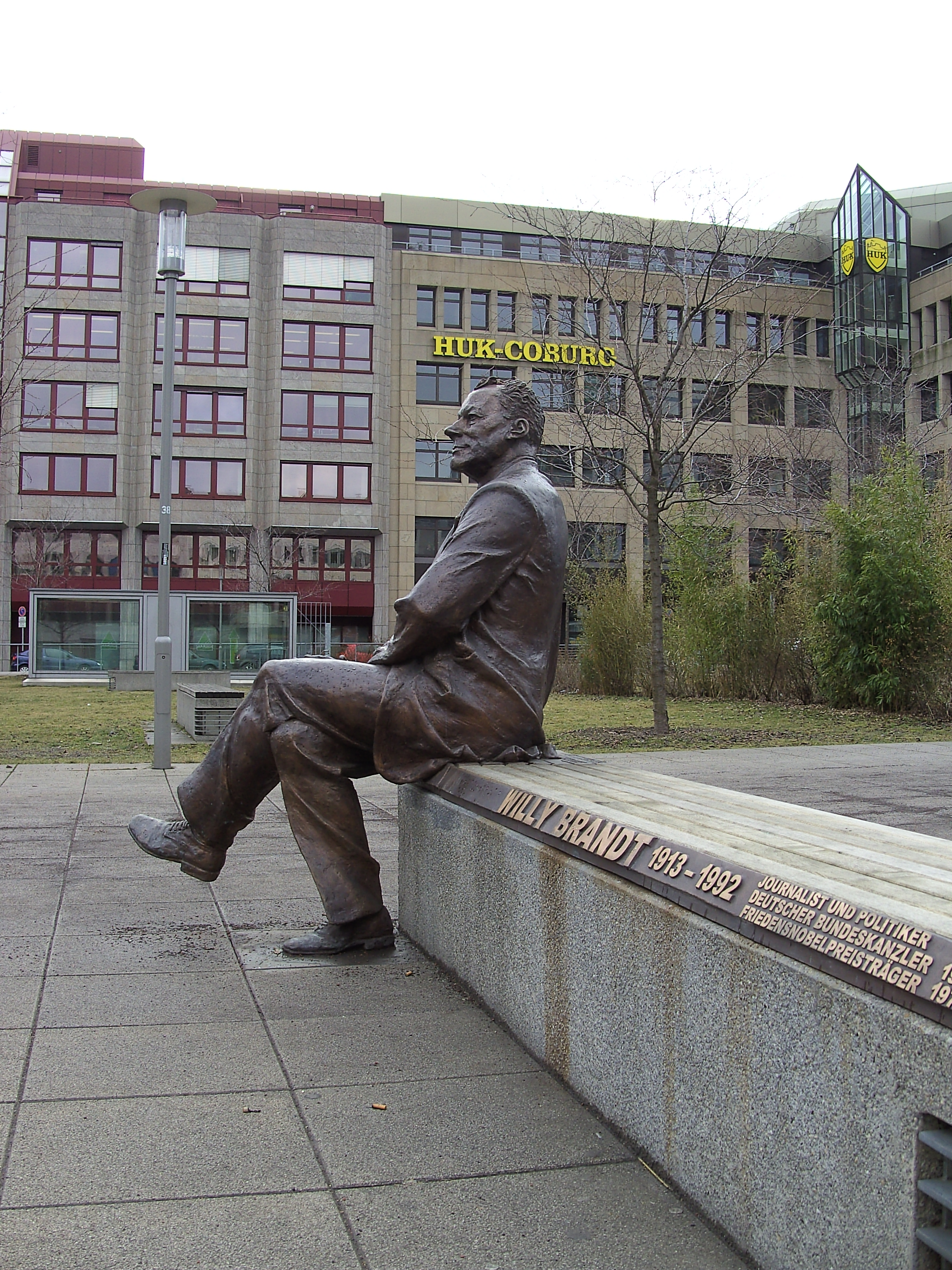
Willy-Brandt-Monument in Nuremberg, Bronze, 2009

Before his move to Germany, Tabachnyk already had created a series of monuments in Ukraine. In 1996, the Memorial for the Victims of the Tragedy in the Wild of Bogunija was installed, depicting the victims of a tragedy which took place during the Second World War, in which prisoners of war and citizens were shot. The memorial combines a 6.5-meter-high granite monument with a bronze figure. In 1995 the Memorial for the Victims of Fascism was opened at the site of a mass grave in Novohrad-Volynskyi where Jews were killed during the Second World War. Tabachnyk used granite for the material, as well as for the Memorial for the burned down villages in Slovechne which was unveiled in 1980. His sculpture "The Magic Horse" which recreates the myth of the same name, was created out of cement, and was installed in 1989 at the recreation park in Schytomyr.

In May 2006, Tabachnyk's life-size statue of Adidas founder Adolf Dassler was installed at the Adi Dassler stadium in Herzogenaurach. The life-size, bronze statue was reproduced in various sizes and now also stands at the new flagship Adidas store in New York City, which is the biggest Adidas store worldwide. The opening of the sculpture in New York was on 1 December 2016. Since January 2019 another original of the statue is placed at the entrance to the Adidas-Store at 22 Avenue des Champs-Élysées in Paris.

In 2008, Tabachnyk won a competition with his design of the Willy Brandt Memorial in Nuremberg. The bronze sculpture is situated at Willy-Brandt-Platz, and depicts the Federal Chancellor and Nobel Prize Winner sitting on a bench. On 9 November 2009, the sculpture was unveiled by Ulrich Maly, descendants of Willy Brandt including Hans-Jochen Vogel and Tabachnyk himself.

In the Aquapark of the Nuremberg Zoo, a bronze sculpture of group of polar bears can be seen since 11 May 2007. The group contains a bear mother playing with her child.

A further bear sculpture which was unveiled in November 2010 in the entrance area of Nuremberg zoo, and carries the title "Brown little bear with a worm". The sculpture displays a small brown bear lying down on his back playing with a worm.

Since November 2012, the bronze sculpture "The Tree of Life" has been standing in the residential area of the Nuremberg zoo. Within the tree, different generations which play a role in the life cycle are depicted and their meanings are implied.

At the end of 2011, Tabachnyk's winning sculpture of "Knut the Dreamer" was unveiled in the Berlin Zoological Garden. It consists of a bronze-cast polar bear, which lies on two ice-sheets made from white granite. On 24 October 2012 Bernhard Blaszkiewitz and Josef Tabachnyk jointly unveiled the 1.40-meter-long and 1.15-meter-wide figure near the polar bear enclosure.

Tabachnyk's Kicker Statue which depicts a football player performing a backwards overheard kick was unveiled on 22 May 2014 in front of the newly designed Kicker Sport Magazine building in Nuremberg's Badstraße.

== Miscellaneous works ==
Miscellaneous works Josef Tabachnyk created a sculpture series titled "Small memorials for great people", which includes depictions of Albert Einstein, Jakob Wasserman, Hermann Kesten and Sigmund Freud.
