= Memorial for the Victims of War from Novohrad-Volynskyi =

Monument in Zviahel, Ukraine

Coordinates: 50.5953659°N 27.6333712°E

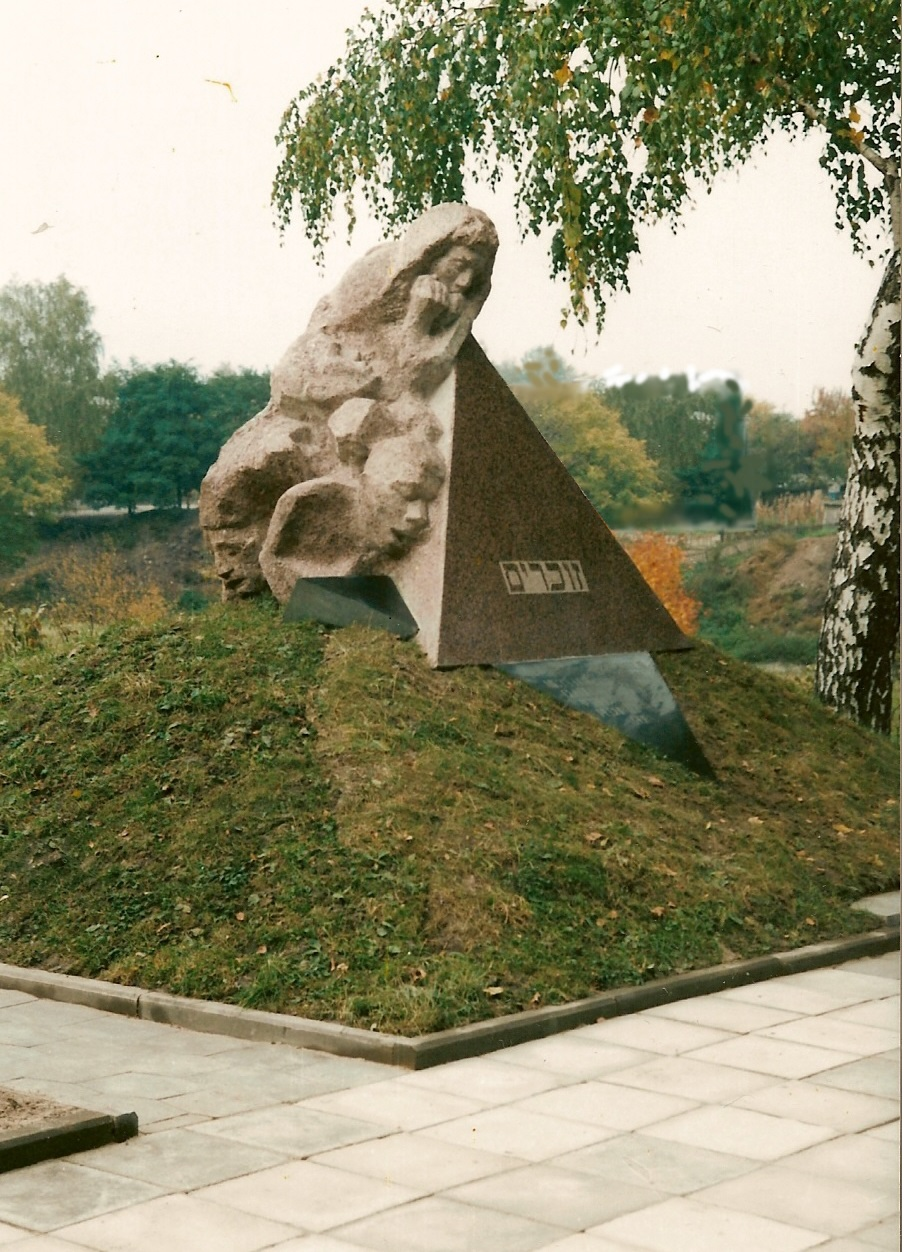
Memorial for the victims of fascism located at the mass grave for Jews who are being shot during the Second World War, by artist Josef Tabachnyk, 1995.

The memorial for the victims of war stands at the mass grave for the Jews who were shot in Novohrad-Volynskyi in the Second World War that began in September 1939 . The monument was created by the artist Josef Tabachnyk who makes monuments and sculptures.

It lies near the House of the Officers in Novohrad-Volynskyi, where women and children were murdered in the Second World War. In pink granite, a mother is depicted carrying her tortured children in her arms. Two stone pyramids connected to one another form a Star of David, on which the inscription "We remember" is written in Hebrew. The black pyramid symbolises a body, which is aiming for the ground. The pink pyramid symbolises a soul, which is ready to rise up to heaven.

The sculpture was opened in 1995. The sculpture's measurements are 200 x 200 x 200 cm.
