= Gerard Barrett (director) =

Irish filmmaker

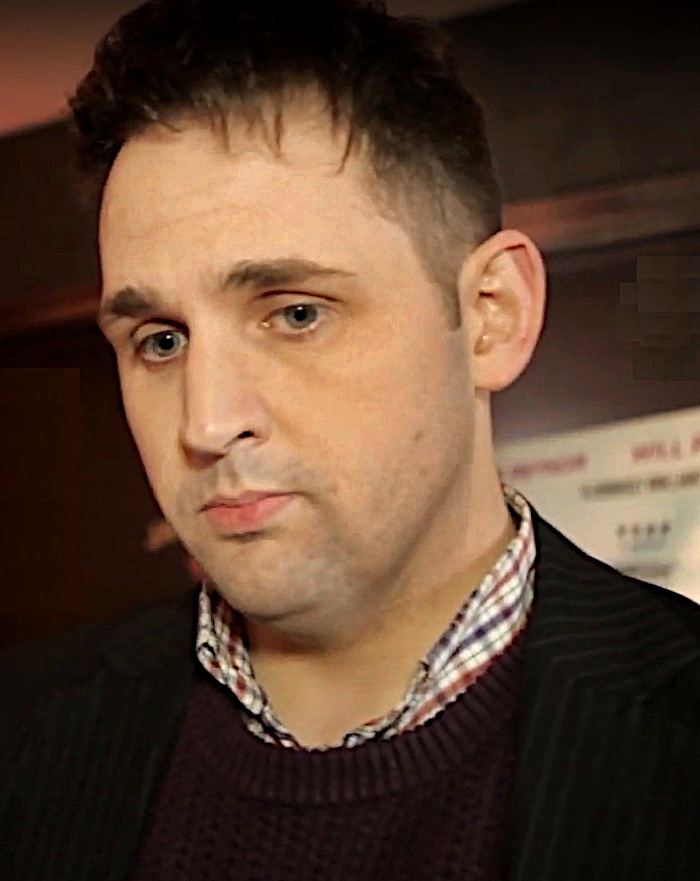
- Barrett at diff 2015
- Born: 5 July 1987 (age 38); Knockanure, Listowel, Ireland
- Occupations: Film director, screenwriter
- Years active: 2010–present
- Spouse: Gráinne O'Sullivan (2016-present)

Gerard Barrett is an Irish filmmaker. He came to prominence when he won the Rising Star Award at the 10th Irish Film & Television Awards for his debut, Pilgrim Hill. His follow-up Glassland starred Jack Reynor as a young man who tries to help his mother (Toni Collette).

In 2015, Barrett filmed Brain on Fire based on the book of the same name, starring Chloë Grace Moretz in New York City and Canada.

His television mini-series Smalltown was screened in Ireland in September 2016. In 2017, his movie, Limbo premiered at the 29th Galway Film Fleadh, and his hour-long drama, Honey, was sold to FX.

Barrett attended St Michael's College, Listowel. A graduate of Tralee IT, where he studied Film, TV and Media. He was married on 2 January 2016.

== Filmography ==
- The Valley of Knockanure (2009)
- Pilgrim Hill (2013)
- Glassland (2014)
- Brain on Fire (2015)

== Television ==
- Newsbag - RTÉ (2013)
- Smalltown (2016)
- Limbo (2017)

== Awards ==
- 10th Irish Film & Television Awards - Winner: Rising Star Award, for Pilgrim Hill (2013)
- International Festival of Independent Cinema Off Camera - Winner: Making Way Award, for Glassland (2014)
