= Nuremberg Zoo =

Zoo in Bavaria, Germany

Nuremberg Zoo (Tiergarten Nürnberg)
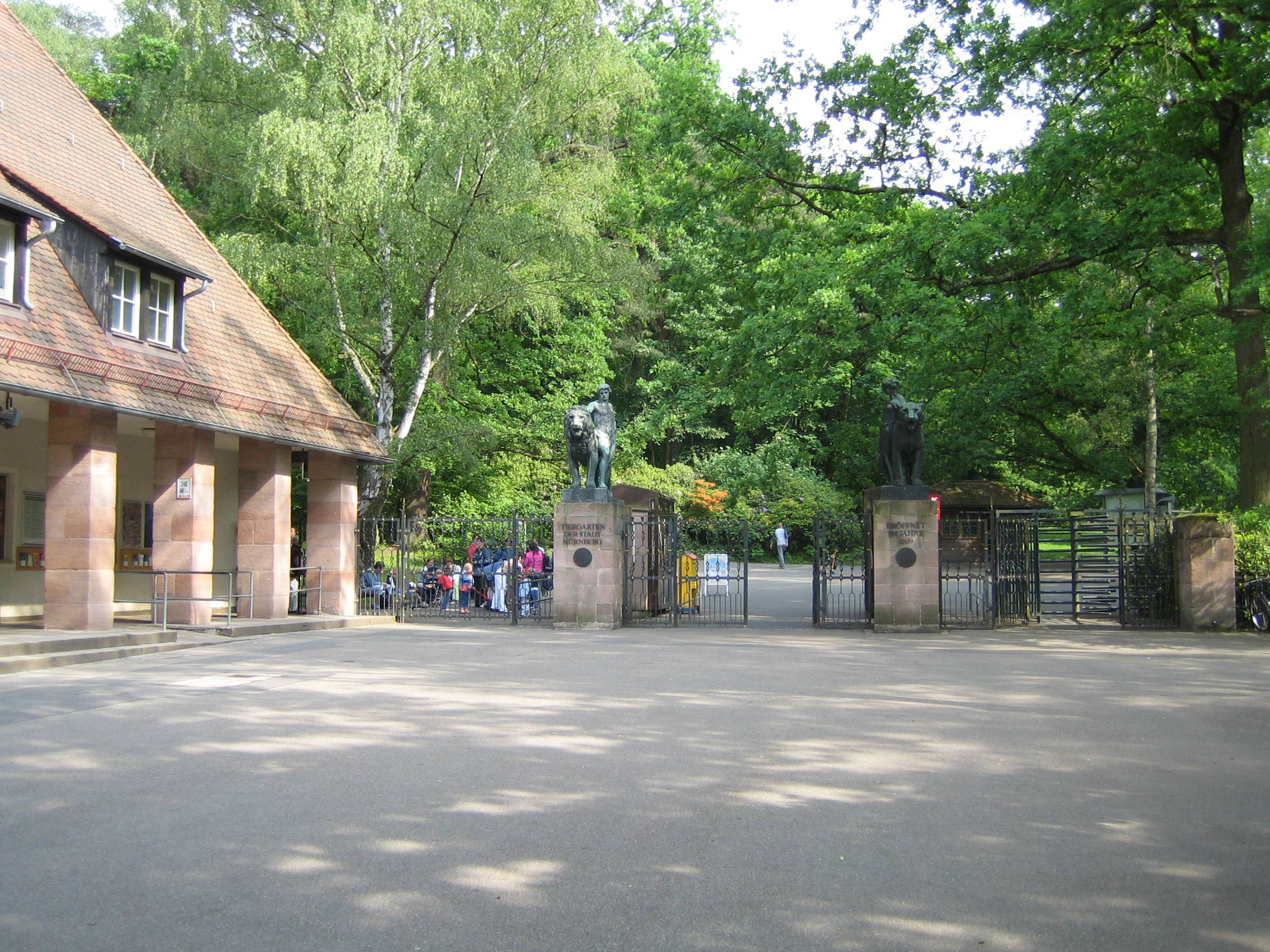
- Zoo entrance
- Interactive map of Nuremberg Zoo (Tiergarten Nürnberg)
- 49°26′51″N 11°8′41″E
- Date opened: 11 May 1912
- Location: Nuremberg, Germany
- Land area: 67 hectares (170 acres)
- No. of species: 300
- Website: http://www.tiergarten.nuernberg.de

Nuremberg Zoo (German: Tiergarten Nürnberg) is a zoo located in the Nuremberg Reichswald ("imperial forest"), southeast of Nuremberg, Germany. With an area of 67 hectares (170 acres), approximately 300 animal species are kept by the zoo.

== History ==
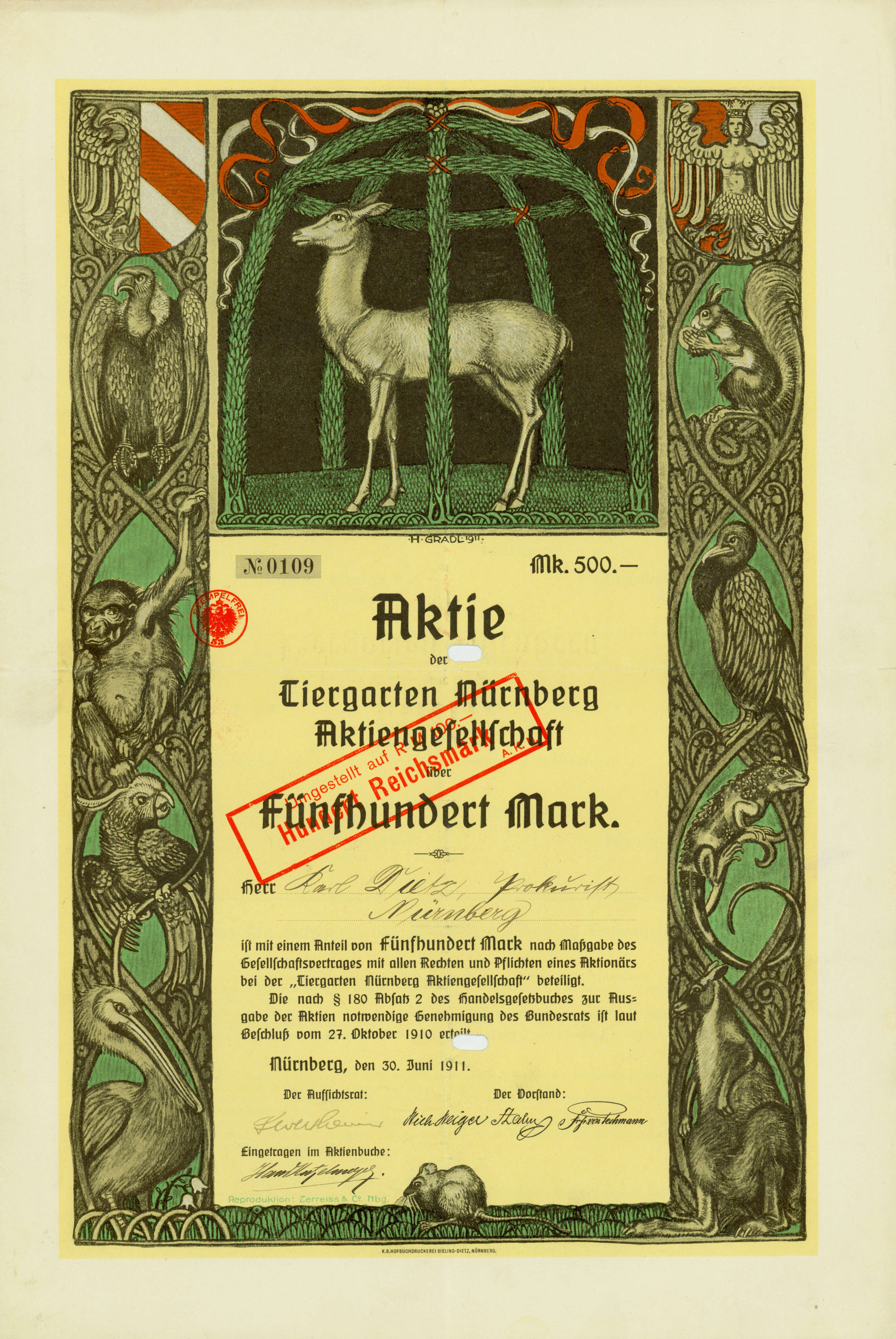
Founder's share of the Tiergarten Nürnberg AG, issued 30. June 1911

=== In the Middle Ages ===
The tradition of zoos in Nuremberg goes back to the Middle Ages. However the only indications of a zoo maintained by the local nobility, the Burgraves, take the form of certain place names, such as the Zoo Gate (Tiergärtner Tor) and the adjoining Zoo Square (Tiergärtnertorplatz). This preserve stretched as far as the so-called Johannisfelder (present-day St. Johannis) and the Rohlederersgarten (present-day Klinikum Nord). One can only speculate about the use made of the park.

=== 20th century ===
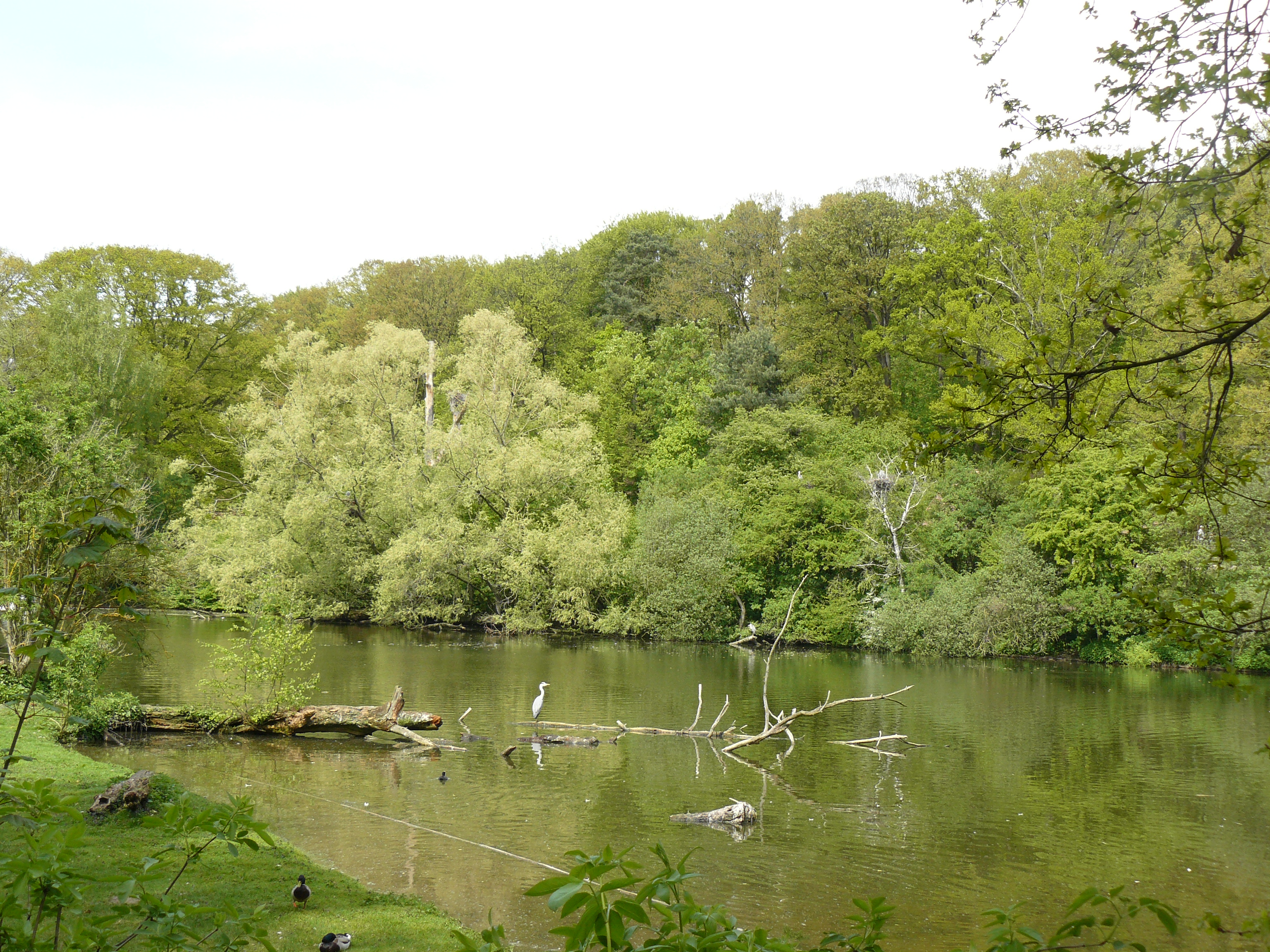
Pond

The Nuremberg Zoo was founded on 11 May 1912 on the site of the Bavarian State Exhibition at the Luitpoldhain. After the Nazis seized power, the zoo had to give way for the Reichsparteitagsgelände (Nazi party rally grounds) at the Dutzendteich and was closed in February 1939. In May 1939, the new zoo was opened in the Reichswald at the Schmausenbuck. It was almost completely destroyed after World War II and rebuilt at the end of the 1950s.

=== Today ===
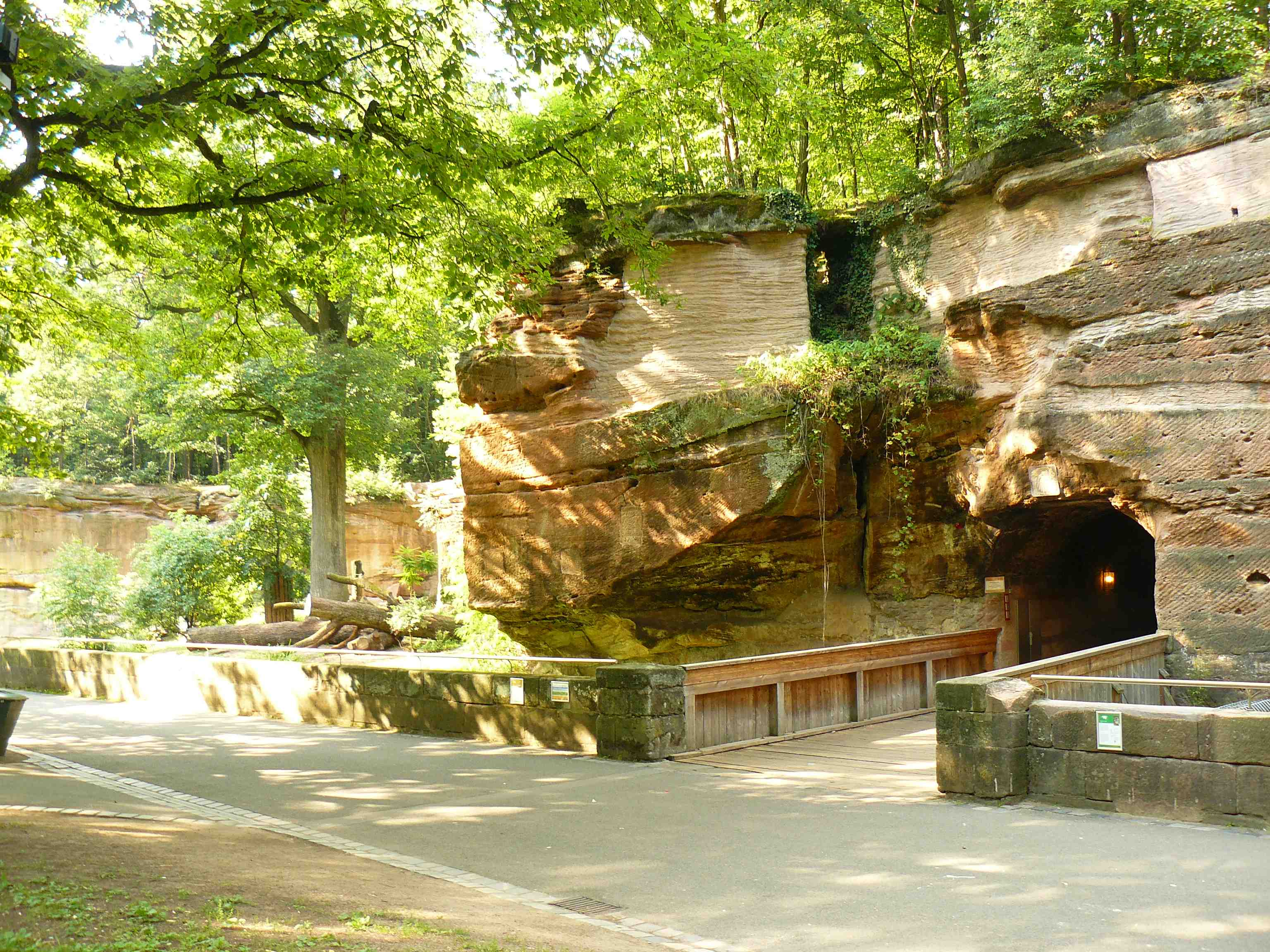
The entrance of the big cat house, which is a tunnel through sandstone leading into the house, which is situated behind it

With 67 hectares (170 acres), it is one of the largest European zoos. Typical are large, natural enclosures, which are embedded in a landscape of forests and stone pits. More than one million visitors are counted every year. Many new enclosures, e.g., for gorillas, snow leopards and polar bears, were built in recent years.

Flocke, a captive-born polar bear who was born at the zoo in December 2007, became a popular tourist attraction and an international celebrity after a controversial decision to remove her from her mother and raise her by hand. Flocke has since been "adopted" by United Nations Environment Programme chief Achim Steiner.

== Animals ==
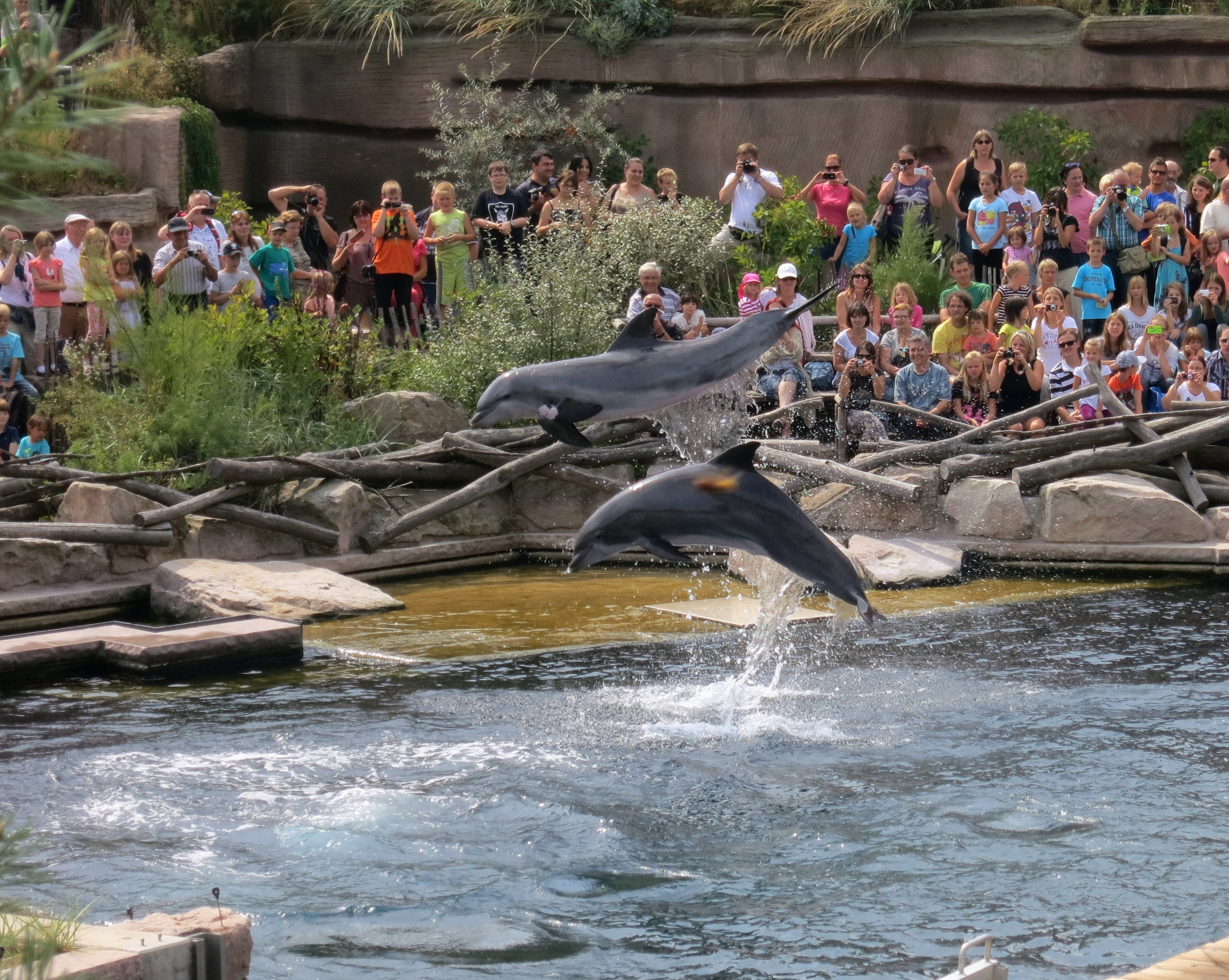
Show in the Dolphin Lagoon

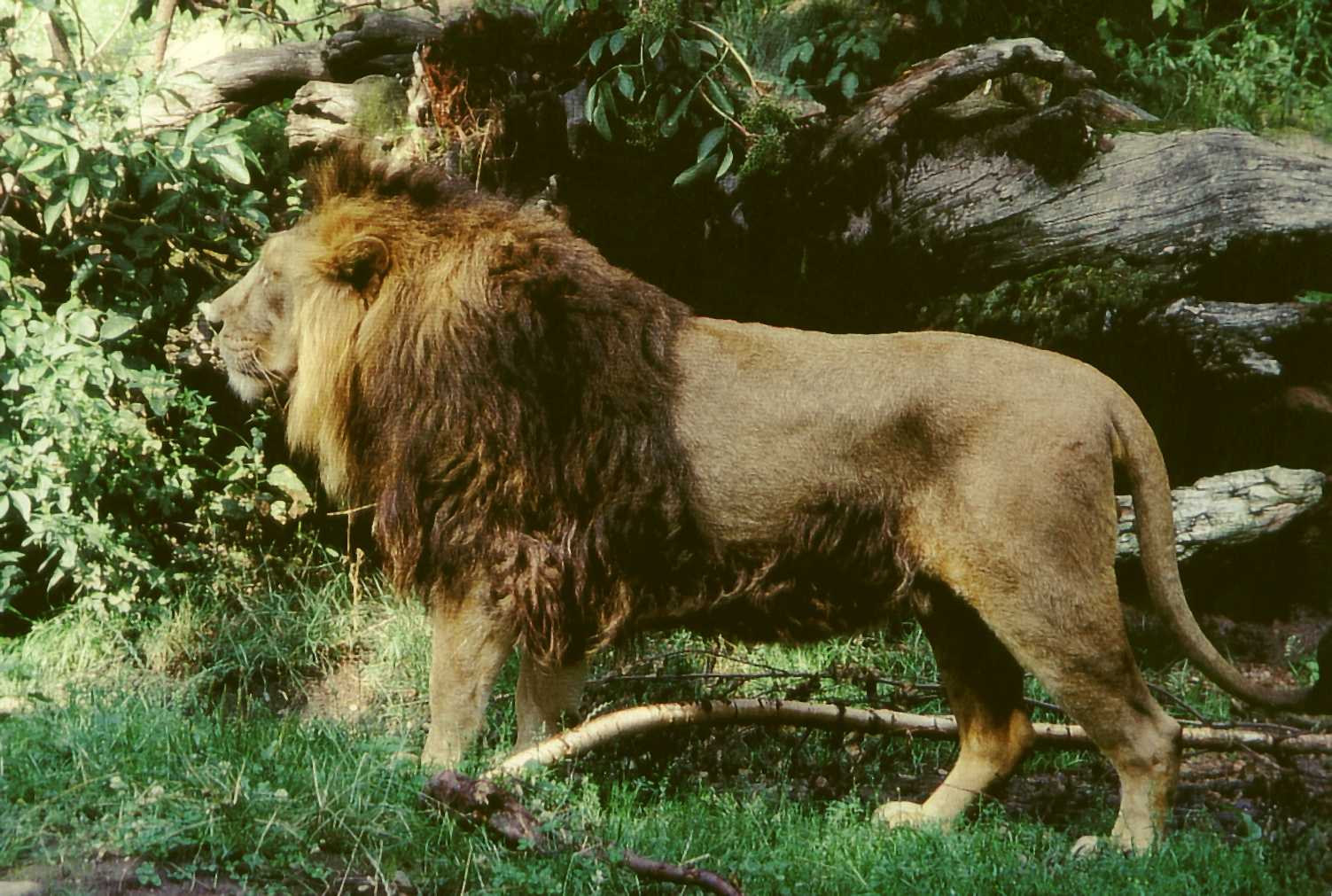
Asiatic lion in the Tiergarten

The zoo has Asiatic lions and Siberian tigers, which live in former stone pits. The inner cages of both large cat species are behind a rock face and can be visited only after entering the house through a tunnel. Other carnivores are snow leopards, polar bears, and maned wolves. The zoo is also successful in breeding South African cheetahs. Further attractions are Common bottlenose dolphins, Indian rhinoceroses, Malayan tapirs, lowland gorillas, California sea lions and manatees.

Many hooved mammals, like reticulated giraffes, Somali wild asses, Père David's deer, European and American bison, African buffalo, plains zebras and Turkmenian kulans live in large enclosures, which are embedded in the forested, hilly landscape. Beautiful ponds are home to a variety of water birds.

== Structures and statues ==
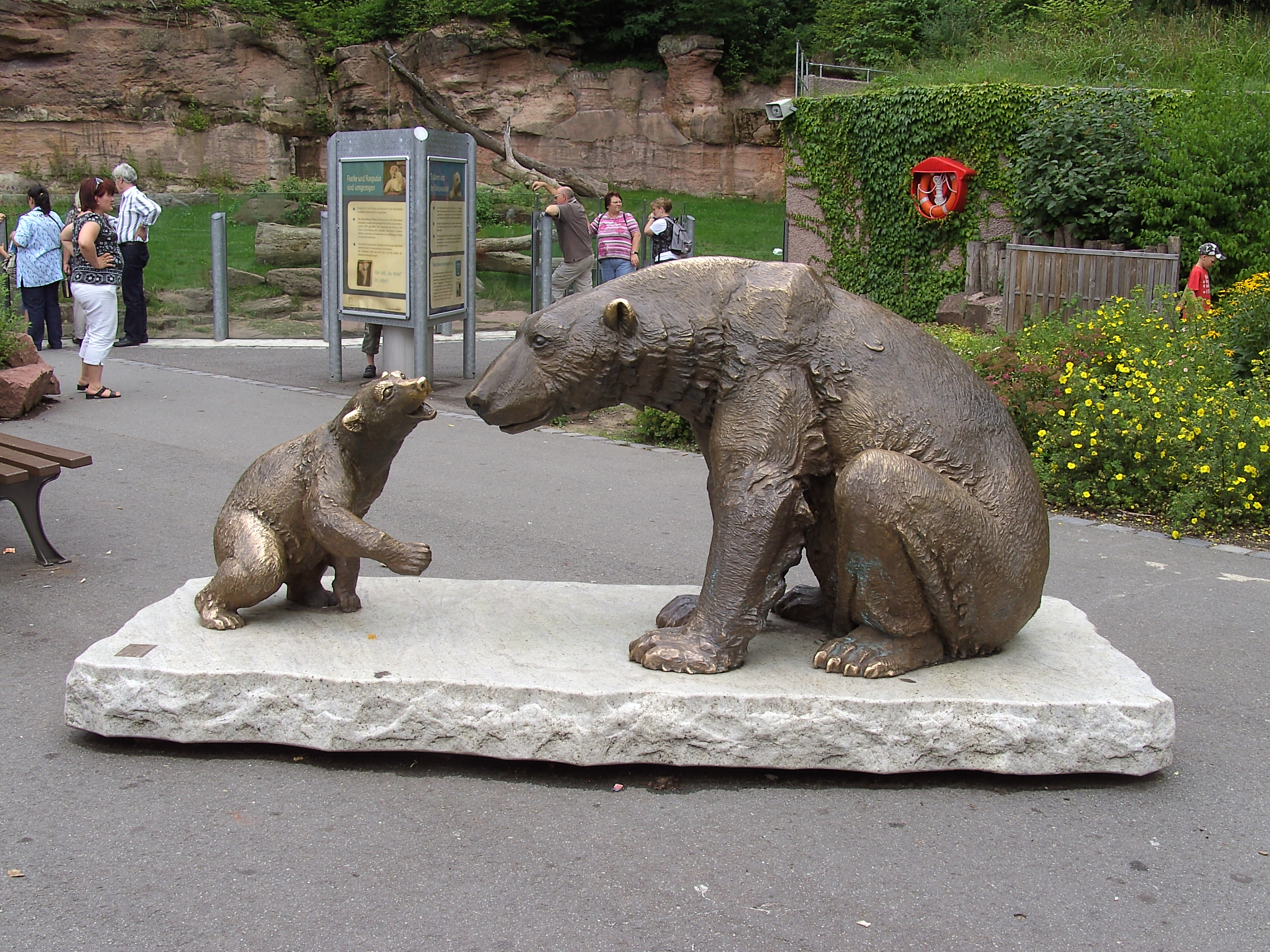
Polar Bear Sculpture, 2007

"The Polar Bear Group" is a life-size, bronze animal sculpture in the Aqua Park of the Zoo, created by Josef Tabachnyk in 2007.

The Group consists of a mother polar bear with her young cubs in a playful pose, and is based on a flat plate from bright granite, which is reminiscent of an ice floe. The Group was created by the sculptor Josef Tabachnyk and was installed in the zoo in 2007. The measurements of the Polar Bear Group are 120x240x90 cm. Since November 2010, another bronze bear sculpture created by the same artist was installed in the entrance area of the zoo. It depicts a brown bear lying on its back, playing with a slug.

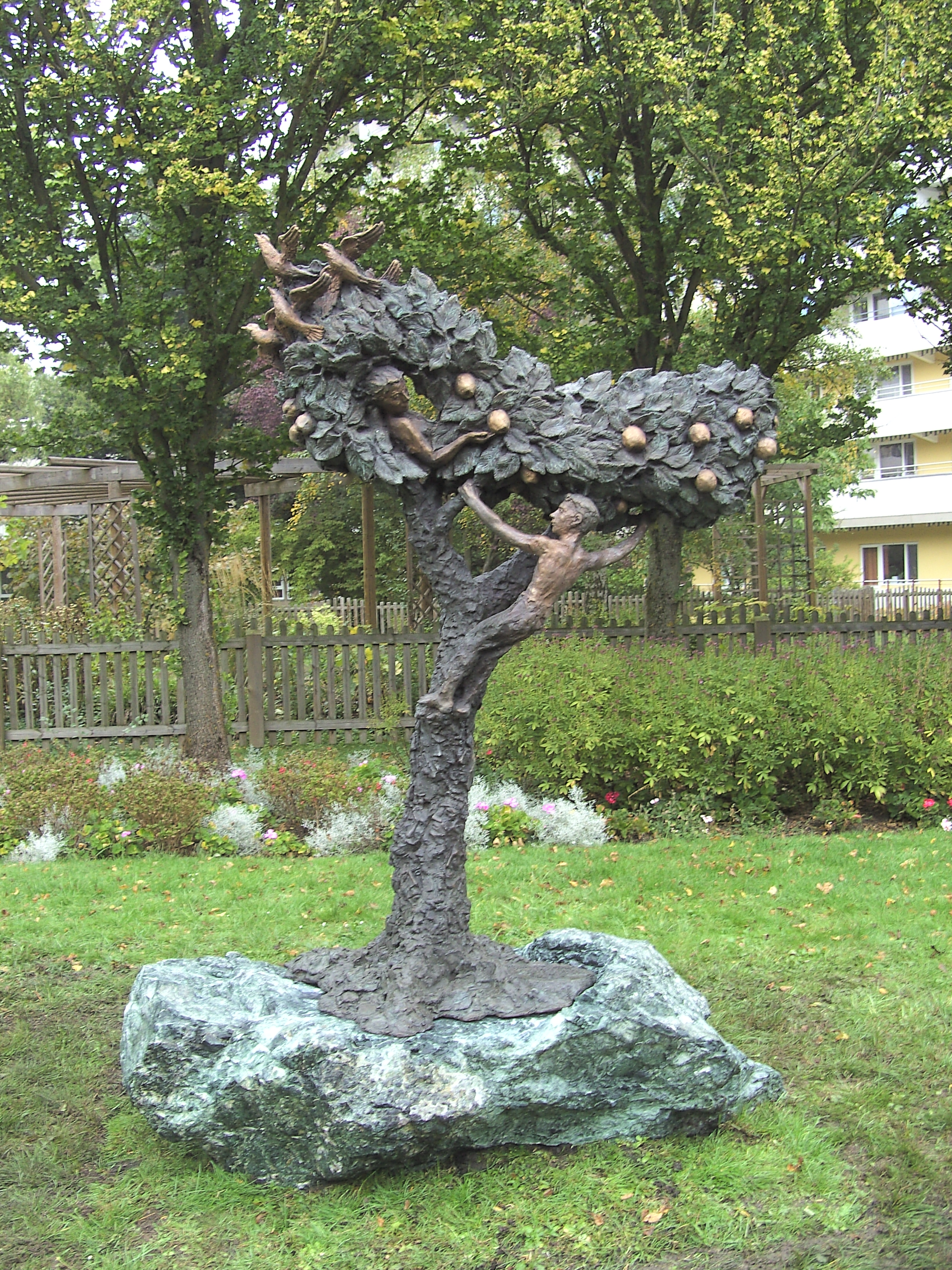
The bronze sculpture, The Tree of Life, 2012

"The Tree of Life" is a bronze sculpture also created by the artist Tabachnyk. It has been standing on public grounds of the Zoo since November 2012.

The sculpture, when viewed from a distance, depicts a blossoming apple tree. Up close, one can see a few elements of the life cycle embedded in the various elements of the tree. In the tree’s roots and bark, faces, hands and other body parts are implied. Within the branches grows a young male figure, who appears to raise up the leaves and fruit of the tree. Additionally a female figure lies in the trees. At the top of the tree birds are leaving and flying up to heaven. The measurements of the sculpture are 270x190x95cm.

From below the generations are depicted. The ancestors, which are shown in the tree’s roots, bark and branches, create the foundation for the current generation. The current generation cares for and provides for the leaves and fruit, which depict the future generations.

== Literature ==
- Dr. Peter Mühling, Der Alte Nürnberger Tiergarten 1912–1939: Eine Chronik, Tiergarten der Stadt Nürnberg, Nürnberg 1987, ISBN 3-926760-00-1
- Wegweiser durch den Tiergarten Nürnberg, 29. neubearbeitete Auflage, Tiergarten der Stadt Nürnberg, Nürnberg 2007, ISSN 1436-4352
- Lorenzo von Fersen, Delfinariumsführer Tiergarten Nürnberg, 3. Aufl., Tiergarten der Stadt Nürnberg, Nürnberg 2003, ISBN 3-926760-04-4
- Der Tiergarten Nürnberg – Ein Virtueller Rundgang, imbiss-media, Nürnberg 2002, ISBN 3-00-010598-0
- Michael Diefenbacher, Rudolf Endres (Hsg.): Stadtlexikon Nürnberg. 2. verb. Auflage. Nürnberg: Verlag W. Tümmels, 2000, 1247 S., ISBN 3-921590-69-8
