= Pilgrim Hill (film) =

- the movie poster
- Directed by: Gerard Barrett
- Written by: Gerard Barrett
- Produced by: Gerard Barrett
- Starring: Joe Mullins; Muiris Crowley
- Cinematography: Ian D. Murphy
- Edited by: Gerard Barrett
- Production companies: Irish Film Board; Nine Films
- Distributed by: Element Pictures
- Release date: 12 April 2013 (Ireland)
- Running time: 85 minutes (theatrical cut)
- Country: Ireland
- Language: English
- Budget: €4,500 €15,000 (Post-Production)
- Box office: €100,000 (Ireland)

Pilgrim Hill is a 2013 Irish rural drama film. Writer and director Gerard Barrett won the Rising Star Award at the 10th Irish Film & Television Awards.

The film depicts the solitary life of an Irish dairy farmer, living with only his invalided father in a remote Irish location. The film catalogues his daily farming routine as well as his rather limited encounters with others. The Irish Times (in a four-star review) wrote: "Barrett's debut feature is a quietly stunning slice of rural naturalism. A masterful debut."
