= Kicker Statue =

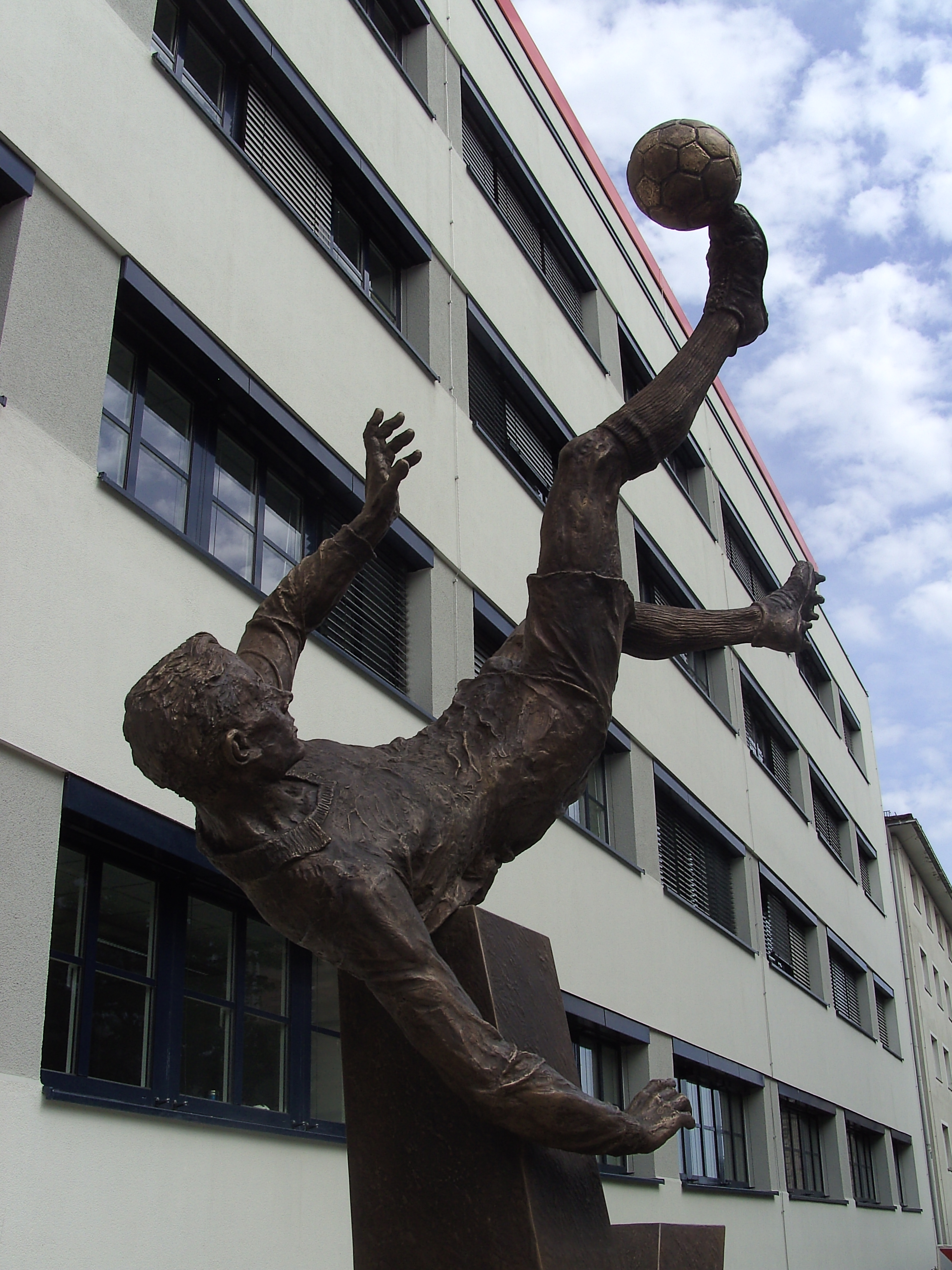
- Kicker-Statue, artist Josef Tabachnyk, Nuremberg, 2014
- Artist: Josef Tabachnyk
- Year: 2014
- Subject: A footballer
- Dimensions: 320 cm × 200 cm × 140 cm (130 in × 79 in × 55 in)
- Location: Nuremberg
- 49.4491°N 11.0870°E

The Kicker Statue is a sculpture created by sculptor Josef Tabachnyk. It stands in front of the new building of the Kicker sports magazine at Badstraße in Nuremberg. It depicts a football player performing a bicycle kick, where the player performs a kick of the ball with his foot above his head. The statue was erected on 22 May 2014, and Toni Schnell (business leader of the Olympia Publishing House), Josef Tabachnyk, and numerous employees of the Kicker sports magazine were present.

The green granite symbolises the football field, and the K is the logo of the magazine Kicker. After overcoming the earth's gravity, the dynamic figure of the football player, The Bicycle Kicker, floats in the air.

The measurements of the statue are 320x200x140 cm.

According to Josef Tabachnyk the ball rises to the peak of the foot, as it is above all "a symbol of the spirit of sport, the passion for the beauty of the game, the love of millions for this sport".
