= Anti-NMDA receptor encephalitis =

Rare disease which results in brain inflammation

- Other names: NMDA receptor antibody encephalitis, anti-N-methyl-D-aspartate receptor encephalitis, anti-NMDAR encephalitis
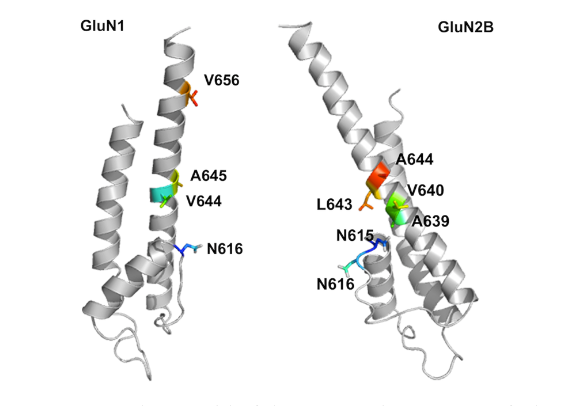
- A schematic diagram of the NMDA receptor
- Specialty: Neurology
- Symptoms: Early: Fever, headache, feeling tired, psychosis, agitation Later: Seizures, decreased breathing, blood pressure and heart rate variability
- Complications: Long term mental or behavioral problems
- Usual onset: Over days to weeks
- Risk factors: Ovarian teratoma, unknown
- Diagnostic method: Specific antibodies in the cerebrospinal fluid
- Differential diagnosis: Viral encephalitis, acute psychosis, neuroleptic malignant syndrome
- Treatment: Immunosuppressive medication, surgery
- Medication: Corticosteroids, intravenous immunoglobulin (IVIG), plasma exchange, azathioprine Rituximab
- Prognosis: Typically good (with treatment)
- Frequency: Rare
- Deaths: ~4% risk of death

Anti-NMDA receptor encephalitis is a type of brain inflammation caused by antibodies. Early symptoms may include fever, headache, and feeling tired. This is then typically followed by psychosis which presents with false beliefs (delusions) and seeing or hearing things that others do not see or hear (hallucinations). People are also often agitated or confused. Over time, seizures, decreased breathing, and blood pressure and heart rate variability typically occur. In some cases, patients may develop catatonia.

About half of the cases are associated with tumors, most commonly teratomas of the ovaries. Another established trigger is herpesviral encephalitis which is associated with over half of all identified pediatric cases, while the cause in other cases is unclear. The underlying mechanism is autoimmune, with the primary target being the GluN1 subunit of the N-methyl-D-aspartate receptors (NMDAR) in the brain. Diagnosis is typically based on finding specific antibodies in the cerebrospinal fluid. MRI of the brain is often normal. Misdiagnosis is common.

Treatment is typically with immunosuppressive medication and, if a tumor is present, surgery to remove it. With treatment, about 80% of cases have a good outcome. Outcomes are better if treatment is begun earlier. Long-term mental or behavioral problems may remain. About 4% of those affected die from the condition. Recurrence occurs in about 10% of people.

The estimated number of cases of the disease is one in 1.5 million people per year. The condition is relatively common compared to other paraneoplastic disorders. About 80% of those affected are female. It typically occurs in adults younger than 45 years old, but it can occur at any age. The disease was first described by Josep Dalmau in 2007.

== Signs and symptoms ==
Before the development of a symptom complex that is specific to anti-NMDA receptor encephalitis, people may experience prodromal symptoms, including headaches, flu-like illness, or symptoms similar to an upper respiratory infection. These symptoms may be present for weeks or months before disease onset. Beyond the prodromal symptoms, the disease progresses at varying rates, and patients may present with a variety of neurological symptoms. During the initial stage of the disease, symptoms vary slightly between children and adults. However, behavior changes are a common first symptom within both groups. These changes often include agitation, paranoia, delusions, psychosis, violent behaviors, and suicidal behaviors such as suicidal ideation and self-inflicted violence. Other common manifestations include seizures and bizarre movements, mostly of the lips and mouth, but also including pedaling motions with the legs or hand movements resembling playing a piano. Some other symptoms typical during the disease onset include impaired cognition, memory deficits, and speech problems (including aphasia, perseveration, or mutism).

The symptoms are usually psychiatric in nature, which may confound the differential diagnosis. In many cases, this leads to the illness going undiagnosed. As the disease progresses, the symptoms become medically urgent and often include autonomic dysfunction, hypoventilation, cerebellar ataxia, loss of feeling on one side of the body, loss of consciousness, or catatonia. During this acute phase, most patients require treatment in an intensive care unit to stabilize breathing, heart rate, and blood pressure. One distinguishing characteristic of anti-NMDA receptor encephalitis is the concurrent presence of many of the above listed symptoms. The majority of patients experience at least four symptoms, with many experiencing six or seven over the course of the disease.

== Pathophysiology ==
The condition is mediated by autoantibodies that target NMDA receptors in the brain. These can be produced by cross reactivity with NMDA receptors in teratomas, which contain many cell types, including brain cells, and thus present a window in which a breakdown in immunological tolerance can occur. Other autoimmune mechanisms are suspected for patients who do not have tumors. Whilst the exact pathophysiology of the disease is still debated, empirical evaluation of the origin of anti-NMDA receptor antibodies in serum and cerebrospinal fluid leads to the consideration of two possible mechanisms.

These mechanisms may be informed by some simple observations. Serum NMDA receptor antibodies are consistently found at higher concentrations than cerebrospinal fluid antibodies, on average, ten times higher. This strongly suggests the antibody production is systemic rather than in the brain or cerebrospinal fluid. When concentrations are normalized for total IgG, intrathecal synthesis is detected. This implies that there are more NMDA receptor antibodies in the cerebrospinal fluid than would be predicted given the expected quantities of total IgG.

1. Passive access involves the diffusion of antibodies from the blood across a pathologically disrupted blood-brain barrier (BBB). This cellular filter, separating the central nervous system from the circulatory system, normally prevents larger molecules from entering the brain. A variety of reasons for such a collapse in integrity have been suggested, with the most likely answer being the effects of acute inflammation of the nervous system. Likewise, the involvement of corticotropin releasing hormone on mast cells in acute stress has been shown to facilitate BBB penetration. However, it is also possible that the autonomic dysfunction manifested in many patients during the later phases of the condition aids antibody entry. For example, an increase in blood pressure would force larger proteins, such as antibodies, to extravasate into the cerebrospinal fluid.
2. Intrathecal production (production of antibodies in the intrathecal space) is also a possible mechanism. Dalmau et al. demonstrated that 53 out of 58 patients with the condition had at least partially preserved BBBs, whilst having a high concentration of antibodies in the cerebrospinal fluid. Furthermore, cyclophosphamide and rituximab, drugs used to eliminate dysfunctional immune cells, are successful second-line treatments in patients where first-line immunotherapy has failed. These destroy excess antibody-producing cells in the thecal sac, thus alleviating the symptoms.

A more sophisticated analysis of the processes involved in antibody presence in the cerebrospinal fluid hints at a combination of these two mechanisms in tandem.

=== Antibodies ===
Once the antibodies have entered the CSF, they bind to the GluN1 subunit of the NMDA receptor. There are three possible methods in which neuronal damage occurs.

1. A reduction in the density of NMDA receptors on the postsynaptic knob, due to receptor internalization once the antibody has bound. This is dependent on antibodies cross linking.
2. The direct antagonism of the NMDA receptor by the antibody, similar to the action of the classic dissociative anesthetics phencyclidine and ketamine.
3. The recruitment of the complement cascade via the classical pathway (antibody-antigen interaction). Membrane attack complex (MAC) is one of the end products of this cascade and can insert into neurons as a molecular barrel, allowing water to enter. The cell subsequently lyses. Notably, this mechanism is unlikely as it causes the cell to die, which is inconsistent with current evidence.

== Diagnosis ==
First and foremost is a high level of clinical suspicion, especially in young adults showing abnormal behavior as well as autonomic instability. Clinical examination may further reveal delusions and hallucinations, which can aid diagnostic efforts.

The initial investigation usually consists of clinical examination, MRI of the brain, an EEG, and a lumbar puncture for CSF analysis. MRI of the brain may show abnormalities in the temporal and frontal lobes, but does so in less than half of cases. A FDG-PET scan of the brain may show abnormalities in cases when the MRI scan is normal. EEG is abnormal in almost 90% of cases and typically shows general or focal slow wave activity. CSF analysis often shows inflammatory changes with increased levels of white blood cells, total protein and the presence of oligoclonal bands. NMDA receptor antibodies can be detected in serum and/or CSF. Whole body FDG-PET is usually performed as part of tumor screening. A gynecological ultrasound or a pelvic MRI might be performed to search for an ovarian teratoma in women.

Diagnostic criteria for probable and definite anti-NMDA receptor encephalitis have been proposed to facilitate diagnosis at an early stage of the disease and help initiate early treatment.

== Management ==
If a person is found to have a tumor, the long-term prognosis is generally better, and the chance of relapse is much lower. This is because the tumor can be removed surgically, thus eradicating the source of autoantibodies. In general, early diagnosis and aggressive treatment are believed to improve patient outcomes, but this remains impossible to know without data from randomized controlled trials.

- If a tumor is detected, its removal should occur in conjunction with first-line immunotherapy. This involves steroids to suppress the immune system, intravenous immunoglobulin, and plasmapheresis to physically remove autoantibodies. A study of 577 patients showed that over four weeks, about half the patients improved after receiving first-line immunotherapy.
- Second-line immunotherapy includes rituximab, a monoclonal antibody that targets the CD20 receptor on the surface of B cells, thus destroying the self-reactive B cells. Cyclophosphamide, an alkylating agent that cross-links DNA and is used to treat both cancer and autoimmune diseases, has sometimes proven useful when other therapies have failed.
- Other medications, such as alemtuzumab, remain experimental.

== Prognosis ==
The recovery process from anti-NMDAR encephalitis can take many months, depending on its form and severity. The symptoms may reappear in reverse order: The patient may begin to experience psychosis again, leading many people to falsely believe the patient is not recovering. As the recovery process continues, the psychosis fades. Lastly, the person's social behavior and executive functions begin to improve. In patients with herpesviral anti-NMDA encephalitis, the recovery process is typically met with poorer long-term outcomes due to extensive lesions caused by virus-induced necrosis in brain tissue.

== Epidemiology ==
The estimated number of cases of the disease is 1.5 per million people per year. According to the California Encephalitis Project, the disease has a higher incidence than its individual viral counterparts in patients younger than 30. The largest case series as of 2013 characterized 577 people with anti-NMDA receptor encephalitis. The data were limited, but provides the best approximation of disease distribution. It found that women make up 81% of cases. Disease onset is skewed toward children, with a median age of diagnosis of 21 years. Over a third of cases were children, while only 5% of cases were patients over the age of 45. This same review found that 394 out of 501 patients (79%) had a good outcome by 24 months. 30 people (6%) died, and the rest were left with mild to severe deficits. The study mentioned that of the 38% presenting with tumors, 94% of those presented with ovarian teratomas. Within that subset, African & Asian women were more likely to have a tumor, but this was not relevant to the prevalence of the disease within those racial groups.

== Society and culture ==
Anti-NMDA receptor encephalitis is suspected of being an underlying cause of historical accounts of demonic possession.

New York Post reporter Susannah Cahalan wrote a book titled Brain on Fire: My Month of Madness about her experience with the disease. This has subsequently been turned into a film of the same name.

Dallas Cowboys defensive lineman Amobi Okoye spent 17 months battling anti-NMDA receptor encephalitis. In addition to three months in a medically-induced coma, he experienced a 145-day memory gap and lost 78 pounds. He returned to practice on October 23, 2014.

In the Japanese movie called The 8-Year Engagement, a young Japanese woman ends up being in a coma due to anti-NMDA receptor encephalitis.

Knut, a polar bear at the Berlin Zoological Garden that died on 19 March 2011, was diagnosed with anti-NMDA receptor encephalitis in August 2015. This was the first case discovered in a non-human animal.

In Hannibal, Will Graham was affected by NMDA receptor or antibody encephalitis, also known as anti-NMDAR encephalitis.

The TV series Something's Killing Me featured an episode called "Into Madness" that featured two cases of the disease.

== Figures ==
An extreme delta brush in a patient. This EEG pattern is sometimes observed in anti-NMDAr encephalitis. From Mizoguchi et al., 2022.

== See also ==
- Anti-glutamate receptor antibodies
- Neuromyelitis optica spectrum disorder
