= Brain on Fire =

2012 autobiography by Susannah Cahalan

Brain on Fire: My Month of Madness
- First edition hardback cover
- Author: Susannah Cahalan
- Language: English
- Subject: Anti-NMDA receptor encephalitis
- Genre: Autobiography
- Published: 2012, Free Press
- Publication place: United States
- Media type: Print, e-book, audiobook
- Pages: 288 pages
- ISBN: 9781451621372

Brain on Fire: My Month of Madness is a 2012 New York Times best-selling autobiography by New York Post writer Susannah Cahalan. The book details Cahalan's struggle with a rare form of encephalitis and her recovery. It was first published on November 13, 2012, through Free Press in hardback, and was later reprinted in paperback by Simon & Schuster after the two companies merged.

== Synopsis ==
The book narrates Cahalan's issues with anti-NMDA receptor encephalitis and the process by which she was diagnosed with this form of encephalitis. She woke up in a hospital with no memory of the previous month's events, during which time she had violent episodes and delusions. Her eventual diagnosis was made more difficult by various physicians misdiagnosing her with several theories such as "partying too much" and schizoaffective disorder. Eventually several physicians, including Dr. Souhel Najjar, began to suspect that Cahalan was suffering from an autoimmune disease. Najjar diagnosed Cahalan using a test that involved her drawing a clock, a test normally given to people suspected of having dementia or Alzheimer's disease. Rather than drawing the clock face normally, the disease caused Cahalan to draw all the numbers 1 through 12 on the right face of the clock, because the right side of her brain, which regulates the left side of the body, was inflamed. Najjar used this to help diagnose Cahalan and start her road to recovery.

The book also covers Cahalan's life after her recovery, including her reactions to watching videotapes of her psychotic episodes while in the hospital. Cahalan also discusses her symptoms prior to her hospitalization, as she had previously been diagnosed by a psychiatrist with bipolar disorder. While researching, she learned that the disease had been discovered just three years before she became ill. Her research indicated that in 2009, most people with the disease were either misdiagnosed or undiagnosed. Cahalan was fortunate to be correctly diagnosed because, according to Najjar's estimates, only 10 percent of people with the disease were properly diagnosed at that time. Since then, a better understanding of the disease and its symptoms has resulted in more frequent diagnosis and treatment.

== Reception ==
Critical reception for Brain on Fire has been mostly positive. NPR commented that the author was "a naturally talented prose stylist" and that "she perfectly tempers her brutal honesty with compassion and something like vulnerability." The Washington Post praised Cahalan's researching abilities for the book, as they noted that she had to rely on information from others, including family members and medical documents. The book has sold over a million copies, has been translated into more than twenty languages and has helped thousands of patients get diagnosed.

== Film adaptation ==
In May 2014, it was announced that the book was being adapted into a film of the same name, starring Chloë Grace Moretz and produced by Cahalan and Charlize Theron. The film was released on Netflix on June 22, 2018.
