= Kit (association football) =

Equipment and attire worn by players

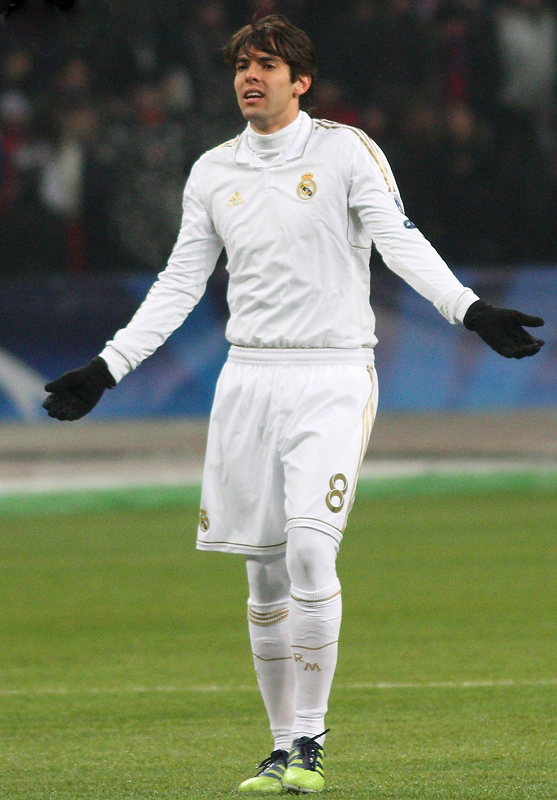
Kaká wearing the Real Madrid CF home kit at a UEFA Champions League match in 2012. In addition to the mandatory shirt with sleeves, shorts, socks, shinguards (covered by socks) and boots as stipulated by Law 4.2, he is also wearing optional gloves and thermal base layers which are permitted under Laws 4.4 and 4.3 respectively.

In association football, a kit (also referred to as a strip or uniform) is the standard equipment and attire worn by players. The sport's rules specify the minimum kit which a player must use, and also prohibit the use of anything that is dangerous to either the player or another participant. Individual competitions may stipulate further restrictions, such as regulating the size of logos displayed on shirts and stating that, in the event of a match between teams with identical or similar colours, one team (usually the away team) must change to different coloured attire, to avoid clashes.

Footballers generally wear identifying numbers on the backs of their shirts. Originally a team of players wore numbers from 1 to 11, corresponding roughly to their playing positions, but at the professional level this has generally been superseded by squad numbering, whereby each player in a squad is allocated a fixed number for the duration of a season. Professional clubs also usually display players' surnames or nicknames on their shirts, above (or, infrequently, below) their squad numbers.

Football kit has evolved significantly since the early days of the sport when players typically wore thick cotton shirts, knickerbockers and heavy rigid leather boots. In the twentieth century, boots became lighter and softer, shorts were worn at a shorter length, and advances in clothing manufacture and printing allowed shirts to be made in lighter synthetic fibres with increasingly colourful and complex designs. With the rise of advertising in the 20th century, sponsors' logos began to appear on shirts, and replica strips were made available for fans to purchase, generating significant amounts of revenue for clubs.

== Equipment ==
=== Basic equipment ===
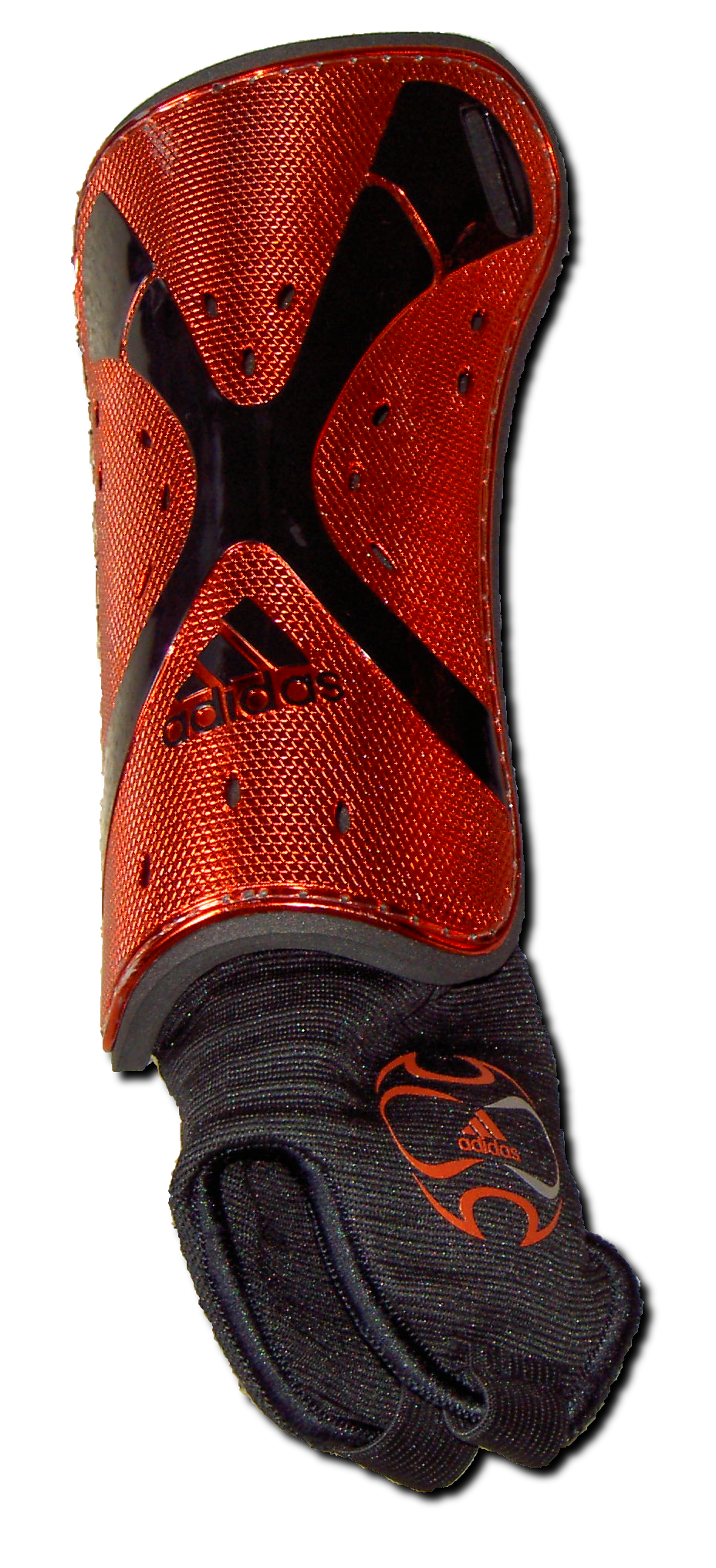
Shin pads are compulsory.

The rules set out the basic equipment which must be worn by all players in Law 4 (Players' Equipment). Five separate items are specified: shirt (also known as a jersey), shorts, socks (also known as stockings), footwear and shin pads. Goalkeepers are allowed to wear tracksuit bottoms instead of shorts.

While most players wear studded football boots ("soccer shoes" or "cleats" in North America), the Laws do not specify that these are required. Shirts must have sleeves (both short and long sleeves are accepted), and goalkeepers must wear shirts which are easily distinguishable from all other players and the match officials. Undershorts and tights must be the same colour as the main colour of the shorts or the lowest part of the shorts. Players on the same team must wear the same colour. Shin pads must be made of suitable material and be of an appropriate size to provide reasonable protection, and must be covered by the socks. Players are responsible for their size and suitability. The only other restriction on equipment defined is the requirement that a player must not use equipment or wear anything deemed dangerous to himself or another player.

It is normal for individual competitions to specify that all outfield players on a team must wear the same colours, though the Law states only "The two teams must wear colours that distinguish them from each other and also the referee and the assistant referees". In the event of a match between teams who would normally wear identical or similar colours the away team must change to a different colour. Because of this requirement a team's second-choice is often referred to as its "away kit" or "away colours", although it is not unknown, especially at international level, for teams to opt to wear their away colours even when not required to by a clash of colours, or to wear them when they are the home team. The England national team sometimes plays in red shirts even when their white standard kit does not clash with their opponent, as this was the strip worn when the team won the 1966 FIFA World Cup. In some cases both teams have been forced (or chose) to wear their second choice away kits; such as the match between Netherlands and Brazil in the 1974 FIFA World Cup where they wore white and dark blue rather than their first choice of orange and yellow, respectively; and the match between Netherlands and Spain in the 2014 FIFA World Cup where they wore dark blue and white rather than their home colors of orange and red, respectively. Many professional clubs also have a "third kit", ostensibly to be used if both their first-choice and away colours are deemed too similar to those of an opponent.

Most professional clubs have retained the same basic colour scheme for several decades, and the colours themselves form an integral part of a club's culture. Teams representing countries in international competition generally wear national colours in common with other sporting teams of the same nation. These are usually based on the colours of the country's national flag, although there are exceptions—the Italy national team, for example, wear blue as it was the colour of the House of Savoy, the Australian team like most Australian sporting teams wear the Australian National Colours of green and gold, neither of which appear on the flag, and the Dutch national team wear orange, the colour of the Dutch Royal House.

The home shirt of Manchester United for the 2005–06 season

Shirts are normally made of a polyester mesh, which does not trap the sweat and body heat in the same way as a shirt made of a natural fibre. Most professional clubs have sponsors' logos on the front of their shirts, which can generate significant levels of income, and some also offer sponsors the chance to place their logos on the back of their shirts. Depending on local rules, there may be restrictions on how large these logos may be or on what logos may be displayed. Competitions such as the Premier League may also require players to wear patches on their sleeves depicting the logo of the competition. A player's number is usually printed on the back of the shirt, although international teams often also place numbers on the front, and professional teams generally print a player's surname above their number. The captain of each team is usually required to wear an elasticated armband around the left sleeve to identify them as the captain to the referee and supporters.

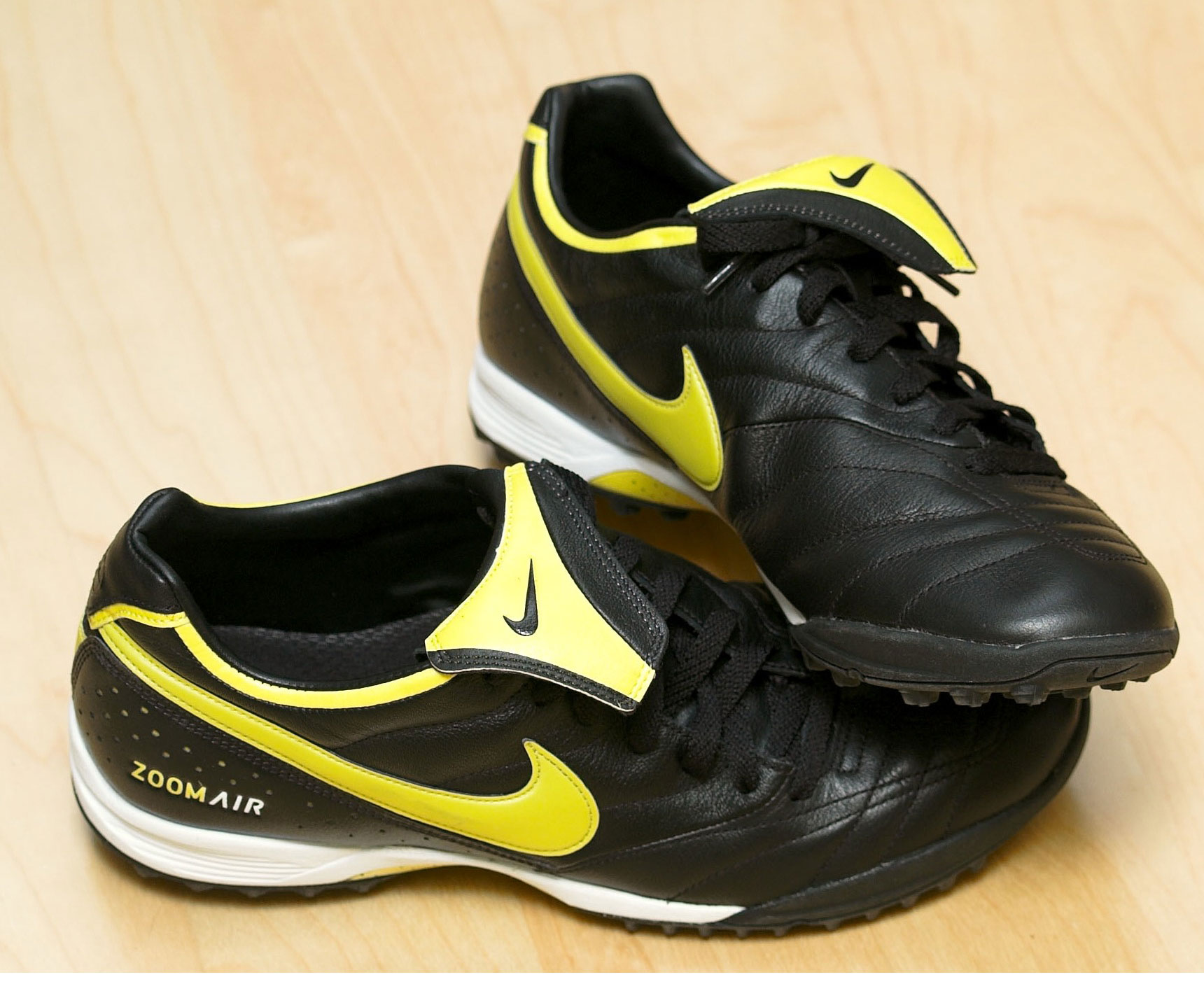
Modern turf shoes, which are designed to be used on hard artificial turf or sand

Most current players wear specialist football boots, which can be made either of leather or a synthetic material. Modern boots are cut slightly below the ankles, as opposed to the high-ankled boots used in former times, and have studs attached to the soles. Studs may be either moulded directly to the sole or be detachable, normally by means of a screw thread. Modern boots such as the Adidas Predator, originally designed by former Liverpool player Craig Johnston, feature increasingly intricate, scientifically aided designs and features such as air pockets in the soles and rubber "blades" on the sole rather than studs. The blades have been the subject of controversy as several top managers have blamed them for injuries both to opposition players and to the wearers themselves.

The rules specify that all players, regardless of gender, must wear the same kit, however in September 2008 the Dutch women's team FC de Rakt made international headlines by swapping its old strip for a new one featuring short skirts and tight-fitting shirts. This innovation, which had been requested by the team itself, was initially vetoed by the KNVB, Dutch football's governing body, but this decision was reversed when it was revealed that the FC de Rakt team were wearing hot pants (very short shorts) under their skirts, and were therefore technically in compliance.

=== Other equipment ===
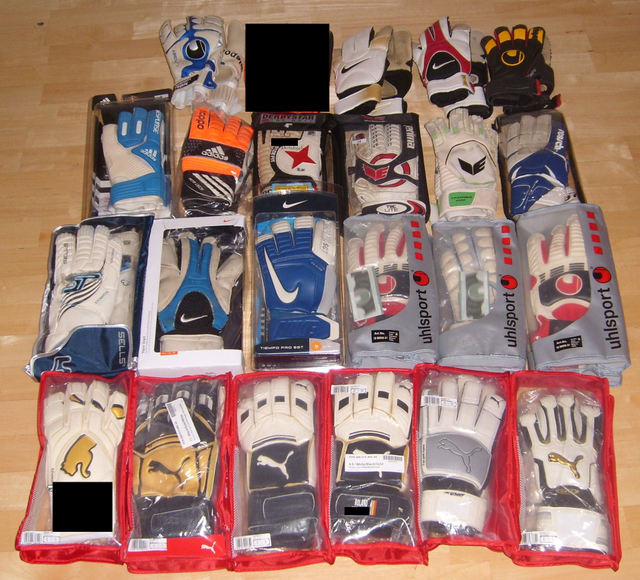
Various styles of goalkeeping gloves

All players are permitted to wear gloves, and goalkeepers usually wear specialist goalkeeping gloves. Prior to the 1970s gloves were rarely worn, but it is now extremely unusual to see a goalkeeper without gloves. In Portugal's match against England in the Euro 2004 tournament, Ricardo drew much comment for deciding to remove his gloves during the penalty shoot-out. Since the 1980s significant advancements have been made in the design of gloves, which now feature protectors to prevent the fingers bending backwards, segmentation to allow greater flexibility, and palms made of materials designed to protect the hand and to enhance a player's grip. Gloves are available in a variety of different cuts, including "flat palm", "roll finger" and "negative", with variations in the stitching and fit. Goalkeepers sometimes also wear caps to prevent glare from the sun or floodlights affecting their performance. Players with sight problems may wear glasses as long as there is no risk of them falling off or breaking and thereby becoming dangerous. Most players affected choose to wear contact lenses, although Dutch player Edgar Davids, unable to wear contact lenses due to glaucoma, was known for his distinctive wraparound goggles. Other items that may be dangerous to other players, such as jewellery, however, are not allowed. Players may also choose to wear headgear to protect themselves from head injury, or to prevent further such injuries, such as Petr Čech and Cristian Chivu's use of rugby helmets, as long as it presents no risk to the safety of the wearer or any other player.

=== Match officials' kit ===
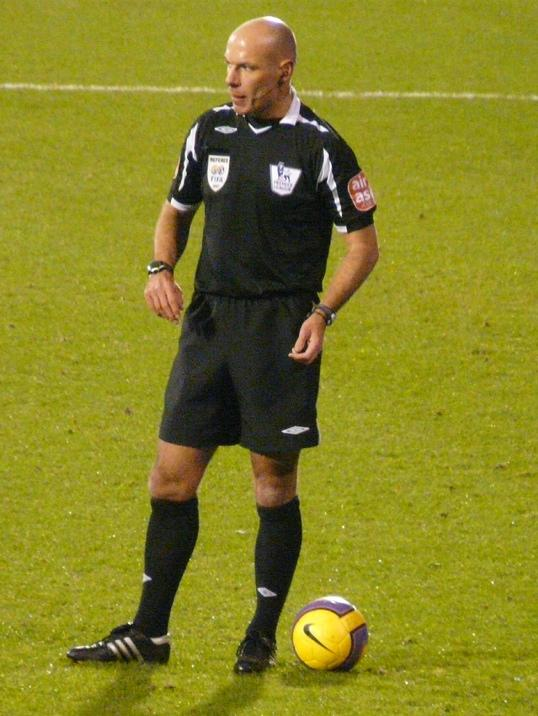
Referee Howard Webb wearing a black strip

Referees, assistant referees and fourth officials wear kits of a similar style to that worn by players; until the 1950s it was more common for a referee to wear a blazer than a jersey. Officials wear shirts of a different colour to those worn by the two teams and their goalkeepers. Black is the traditional colour worn by officials, and "the man in black" is widely used as an informal term for a referee, although increasingly other colours are being used in the modern era to minimise colour clashes. The 1994 World Cup was the first in which FIFA dispensed with black kits for officials. Referees also sometimes have sponsors' logos on their shirts, although these are normally confined to the sleeves.

== History ==
=== Victorian era ===
The first written evidence of a clothing item specifically dedicated to football comes in 1526, from the Great Wardrobe of King Henry VIII of England, which included a reference to a pair of football boots. The earliest evidence of coloured shirts used to identify football teams comes from early English public school football games, for example an image of Winchester College football from before 1840 is entitled "The commoners have red and the college boys blue jerseys" and such colours are mentioned again in a Bell's Life in London article of 1858. House sporting colours are mentioned in Rugby football (rule XXI) as early as 1845: "No player may wear cap or jersey without leave from the head of his house". In 1848, it was noted at Rugby that "considerable improvement has taken place in the last few years, in the appearance of a match... in the use of peculiar dress consisting of velvet caps and jerseys".

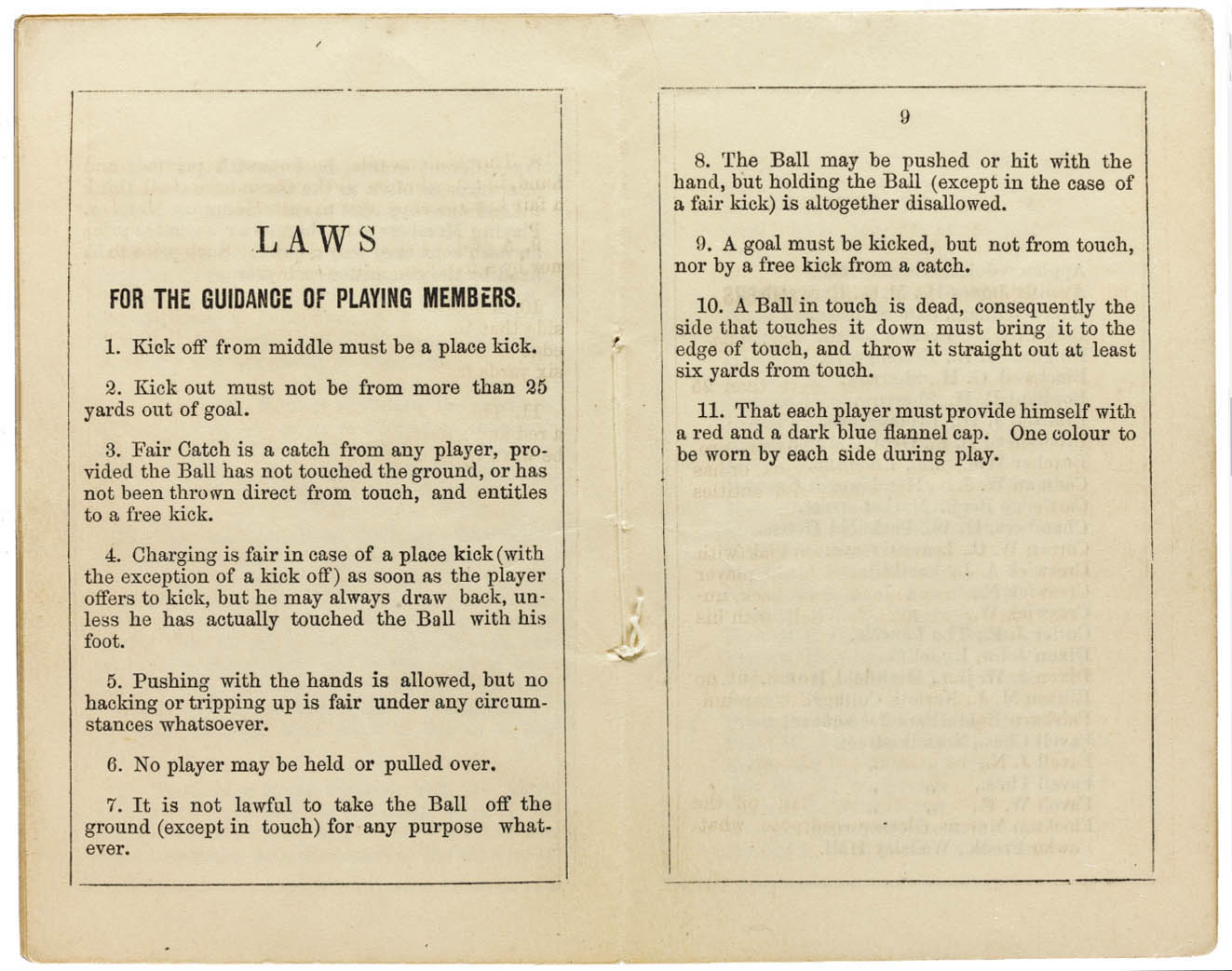
Sheffield rules requiring coloured caps

Organised association football was first played in England in the 1860s, and many teams would probably play in whatever clothing they had available, with players of the same team distinguishing themselves by wearing coloured caps or sashes. The Sheffield club rules in 1857 required members to acquire one red and one dark blue cap, in order to form teams within the membership for matches, and a report of a match between Sheffield and Hallam & Stumperlow in 1860 refers to the Sheffield side wearing their "usual scarlet and white", and the Hallam players a "blue garment". One report of an 1860 match played to an indeterminate code, between Spalding Football Club and Spalding Victoria, refers to Spalding as the "pinks" and Victoria as the "blues".

Limiting colours simply to caps or sashes proved to be problematic though, and an 1867 handbook of the game suggested that teams should attempt "if it can be previously so arranged, to have one side with striped jerseys of one colour, say red, and the other with another, say blue. This prevents confusion and wild attempts to wrest the ball from your neighbour." The Charles Alcock football yearbooks also included return forms which asked club secretaries to include details of club colours, with said colours being listed from the first 1868 edition.

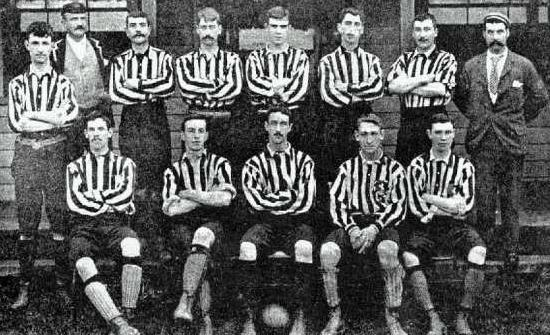
The New Brompton team of 1894 sporting typical kit of the era, including heavy jersey, long shorts, heavy high-topped boots and shin pads worn outside the stockings. Goalkeepers wore the same shirts as their team-mates at this point in time.

The first standard strips emerged with the founding of the FA, the Football Association's initial minutes recording some of the club colours, such as the Royal Engineers A.F.C.'s red and blue, and Lincoln's white jerseys with red, white, and blue caps. Many clubs opted for colours associated with the schools or other sporting organisations from which the clubs had emerged. Blackburn Rovers, for example, adopted shirts of a halved design based on those of the team for former pupils of Malvern College, one of the schools where the sport had developed. Their original colours of light blue and white were chosen to reflect an association with Cambridge University, where a number of the club's founders had been educated. Colours and designs often changed dramatically between matches, with Bolton Wanderers turning out in both pink shirts and white shirts with red spots within the same year. Rather than the modern shorts, players wore long knickerbockers or full-length trousers, often with a belt or even braces; colours were limited to flannel or dark blue serge in the earliest days, the Church F.C. side from Lancashire being noted for adopting red knickers – thanks to links with a local Turkey red dye factory – in the 1880s. Lord Kinnaird, an early star of the game, was noted for always being resplendent in long white trousers. There were no numbers printed on shirts to identify individual players, and the programme for an 1875 match between Queen's Park and Wanderers in Glasgow identifies the players by the colours of their caps or stockings. The first shin pads were worn in 1874 by the Nottingham Forest player Sam Weller Widdowson, who cut down a pair of cricket pads and wore them outside his stockings. Initially the concept was ridiculed but it soon caught on with other players. By the turn of the century pads had become smaller and were being worn inside the stockings.

As the game gradually moved away from being a pursuit for wealthy amateurs to one dominated by working-class professionals, kits changed accordingly. The clubs themselves, rather than individual players, were now responsible for purchasing kit and financial concerns, along with the need for the growing numbers of spectators to easily identify the players, led to the lurid colours of earlier years being abandoned in favour of simple combinations of primary colours. In 1890, the Football League, which had been formed two years earlier, ruled that no two member teams could register similar colours, so as to avoid clashes. This rule was later abandoned in favour of one stipulating that all teams must have a second set of shirts in a different colour available. Initially the home team was required to change colours in the event of a clash, but in 1921 the rule was amended to require the away team to change.

Specialised football boots began to emerge in the professional era, taking the place of everyday shoes or work boots. Players initially simply nailed strips of leather to their boots to enhance their grip, leading the Football Association to rule in 1863 that no nails could project from boots. By the 1880s these crude attachments had become studs. Boots of this era were made of heavy leather, had hard toecaps, and came high above a player's ankles.

=== Early 20th century ===
As the game began to spread to Europe and beyond, clubs adopted kits similar to those worn in the United Kingdom, and in some cases chose colours directly inspired by British clubs. In 1903, Juventus of Italy adopted a black and white strip inspired by Notts County. Two years later, Argentina's Club Atlético Independiente adopted red shirts after watching Nottingham Forest play.

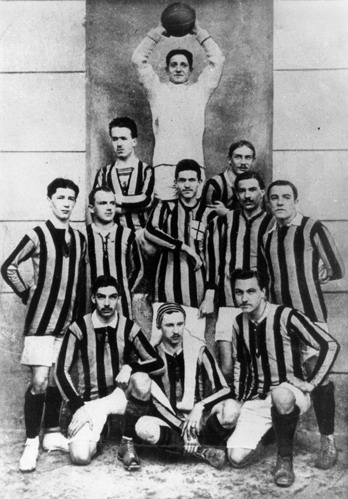
By the early 20th century, shorts had become shorter and goalkeepers wore shirts of a different colour, as seen in this photograph of Internazionale in 1910

In 1904, the Football Association dropped its rule that players' knickerbockers must cover their knees and teams began wearing them much shorter. They became known as "knickers", and were referred to by this term until the 1960s when "shorts" became the preferred term. Initially, almost all teams wore knickers of a contrasting colour to their shirts.

In 1909, in a bid to assist referees in identifying the goalkeeper amongst a ruck of players, the rules were amended to state that the goalkeeper must wear a shirt of a different colour to their team-mates. Initially it was specified that goalkeepers' shirts must be either scarlet or royal blue. When green was added as a third option in 1912, it caught on to the extent that soon almost every goalkeeper was playing in green. In this period, goalkeepers generally wore a heavy woollen garment more akin to a jumper than the shirts worn by outfield players.

Sporadic experiments with numbered shirts took place in the 1920s but the idea did not initially catch on. The first major match in which numbers were worn was the 1933 FA Cup Final between Everton and Manchester City. Rather than the numbers being added to the clubs' existing strips, two special sets, one white and one red, were made for the final and allocated to the two teams by the toss of a coin. The Everton players wore numbers 1–11, while the City players wore 12–22. It was not until around the time of the Second World War that numbering became standard, with teams wearing numbers 1–11. Although there were no regulations on which player should wear which number, specific numbers came to be associated with specific positions on the field of play, examples of which were the number 9 shirt for the team's main striker and the number 1 shirt for the goalkeeper. In contrast to the usual practice, Scottish club Celtic wore numbers on their shorts rather than their shirts until 1975 for international matches, and until 1994 for domestic matches.

The 1930s also saw great advancements in boot manufacture, with new synthetic materials and softer leathers becoming available. By 1936 players in Europe were wearing boots which weighed only a third of the weight of the rigid boots of a decade earlier, although British clubs did not adopt the new-style boots, with players such as Billy Wright openly pronouncing their disdain for the new footwear and claiming that it was more suited to ballet than football.

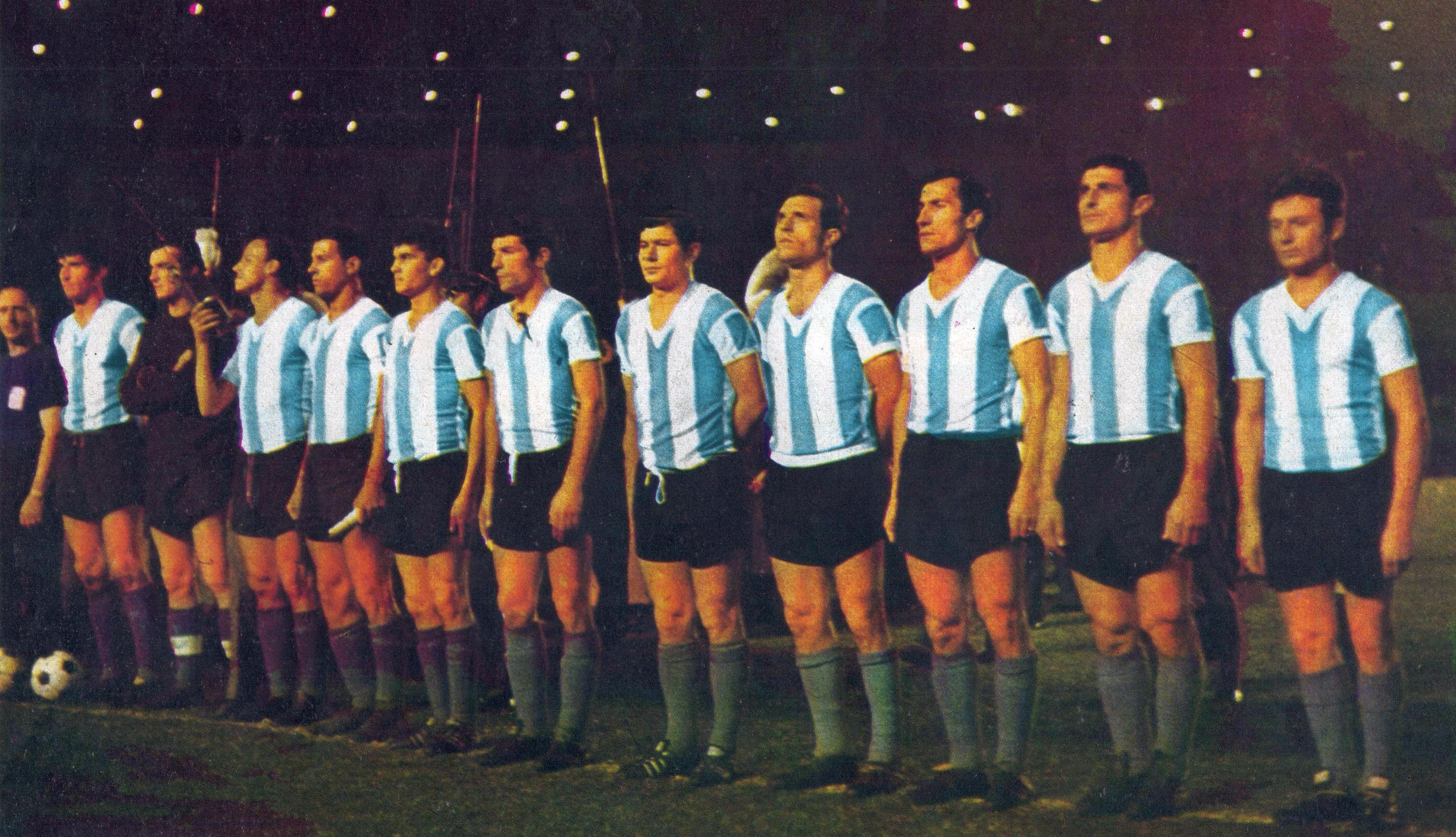
The national team of Argentina in typical kit of the early 1960s

In the period immediately after the war, many teams in Europe were forced to wear unusual kits due to clothing restrictions. England's Oldham Athletic, who had traditionally worn blue and white, spent two seasons playing in red and white shirts borrowed from a local rugby league club, and Scotland's Clyde wore khaki.

In the 1950s, kits worn by players in southern Europe and South America became much more lightweight, with V-necks replacing collars on shirts and synthetic fabrics replacing heavy natural fibres. The first boots to be cut below the ankle rather than high-topped were introduced by Adidas in 1954. Although they cost twice as much as existing styles, the boots were a huge success and cemented the German company's place in the football market. Around the same time Adidas also developed the first boots with screw-in studs which could be changed according to pitch conditions. In other regions, teams were slower to adopt new styles. British clubs again resisted change and stuck resolutely to kits little different from those worn before the war, and Eastern European teams continued to wear kits that were deemed old-fashioned elsewhere. The FC Dynamo Moscow team that toured the United Kingdom in 1945 drew almost as much comment for the players' long baggy shorts as for the quality of their football.

With the advent of international competitions such as the European Cup, the southern European style spread to the rest of the continent. By the end of the decade the heavy shirts and boots of the pre-war years had fallen entirely out of use. The 1960s saw little innovation in kit design, with clubs generally opting for simple colour schemes which looked good under the newly adopted floodlights. Designs from the late 1960s and early 1970s are highly regarded by football fans.

=== Modern era ===
==== Numbers and names ====
In the 1970s, the U.S.-based North American Soccer League experimented with printing players' names on their shirts, and allocating each player a fixed squad number rather than simply numbering the 11 players starting a game from 1 to 11. These ideas did not catch on at the time in other countries. The leading European club leagues introduced fixed squad numbers only in the early 1990s. On 22 August 1979, during a 1979–80 Coppa Italia game against AC Milan, Italian team Monza displayed the players' names above the numbers on the back, a novelty at the time dubbed "all'Americana" (American style); the Italian Football Federation did not approve of the change and fined the club. Shortly after, AC Milan themselves added names to players' shirts in 1980. The names were removed in 1981 and for many years they would not be adopted by any other team in Italy.

==== Designs ====
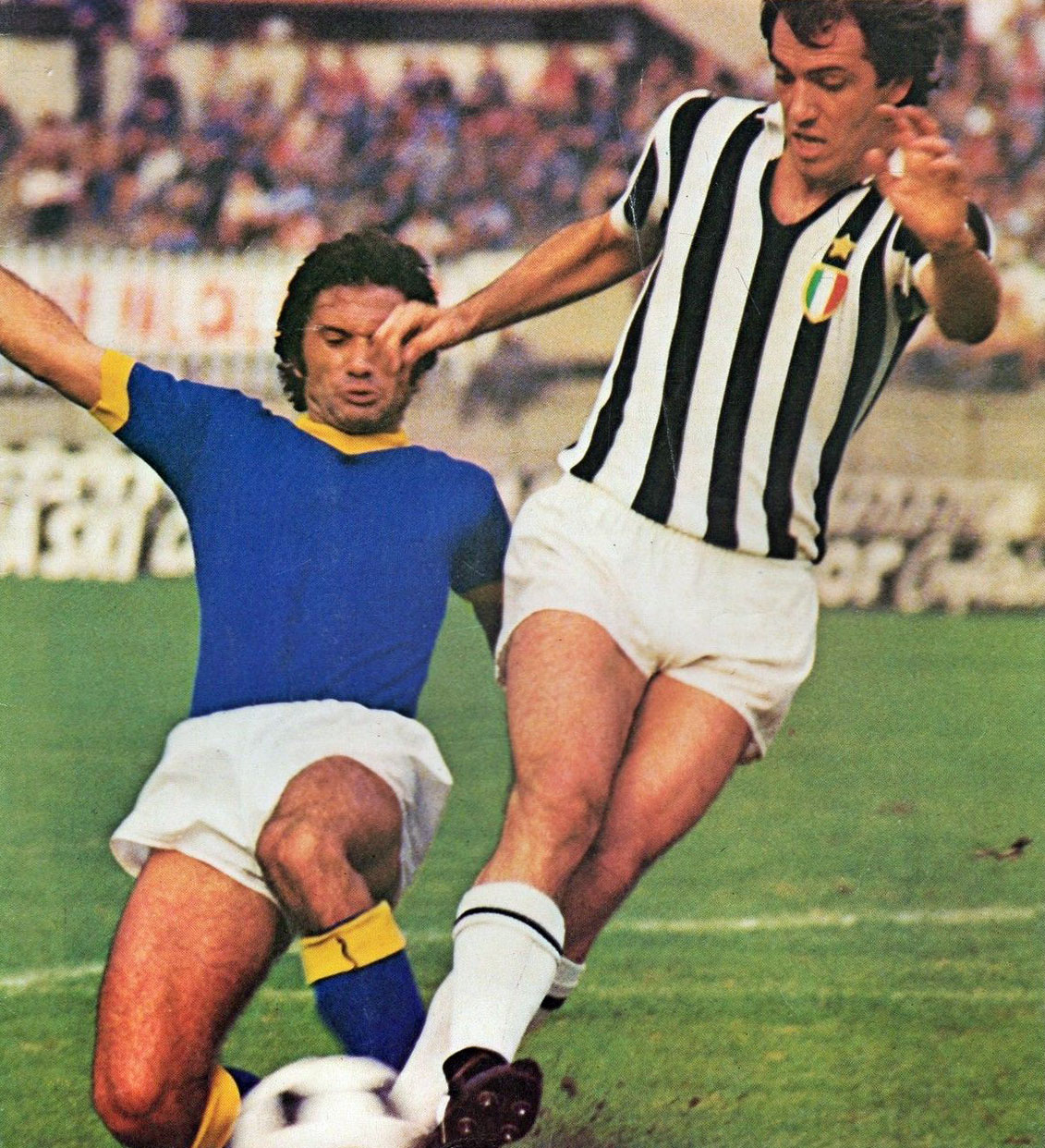
From left to right: Verona's midfielder Maddè versus Juventus' forward Bettega in 1975: "short shorts" were the norm from the mid-1960s to the early-90s, when they changed back to a classic longer and baggier form.

Shorts became shorter than ever during the 1970s and 1980s. In the 1991 FA Cup Final Tottenham Hotspur's players lined up in long baggy shorts and looser shirts designed by Umbro, who had just signed a contract with the club mid-season. Although, the new look was derided, clubs in Britain and elsewhere had within a short time adopted the longer shorts, and by the time of the 1994 FIFA World Cup virtually all national teams as well as clubs had adopted a loose baggy kit. In the 1980s, manufacturers such as Hummel and Adidas began to design shirts with increasingly intricate designs, as new technology led to the introduction of such design elements as shadow prints and pinstripes. Hummel's distinctive halved strip designed for the Danish national team for the 1986 FIFA World Cup caused a stir in the media, while FIFA worried about moiré artefacts in television pictures.

In the 1990s many teams sporting extremely gaudy colour schemes. Design decisions were increasingly driven by the need for the shirt to look good when worn by fans as a fashion item, but many designs from this era have since come to be regarded as amongst the worst of all time. Goalkeepers' shirts were particularly flamboyant, with Jorge Campos famously wearing and selling his own designs. In 1996, Manchester United notoriously introduced a grey strip which had been specifically designed to look good when worn with jeans, but abandoned it halfway through a match after manager Alex Ferguson claimed that the reason why his team was losing 3–0 was that the players could not see each other on the pitch. United switched to different colours for the second half and scored one goal without reply.

A number of advances in kit design have taken place since 2000, with varying degrees of success. In 2002 the Cameroon national team competed in the African Cup of Nations in Mali wearing shirts with no sleeves, but FIFA later ruled that such garments were not considered to be shirts and therefore were not permitted. Manufacturers Puma AG initially added "invisible" black sleeves to comply with the ruling, but later supplied the team with new one-piece singlet-style tops. FIFA ordered the team not to wear the tops but the ruling was disregarded, with the result that the Cameroon team was docked six points in its qualifying campaign for the 2006 FIFA World Cup, a decision later reversed after an appeal. More successful were the skin-tight shirts designed for the Italian national team by manufacturers Kappa, a style subsequently emulated by other national teams and club sides.

A brief fashion for men wearing snood scarf neckwarmers ended in 2011 when the IFAB banned them as potentially dangerous. A ban on women wearing the hijab was introduced by the IFAB in 2007, but suspended in 2012 after pressure from Prince Ali of Jordan, and lifted permanently in 2014, in a change that also permitted Sikh turbans. In keeping with French views, the French Football Federation maintains a ban on the hijab, which was upheld by the Conseil d'État in 2023. Gareth Bale in 2016 began a trend of putting holes in the backs of one's socks to ease constriction of the calf muscle; in November 2017 a referee forced Ezequiel Garay to change socks he decided had too many holes. A brief fad arose for players celebrating goals by lifting or completely removing their shirts to reveal political, religious or personal slogans printed on undershirts. This led to a ruling from the International Football Association Board in 2002 that undershirts must not contain slogans or logos; since 2004 it has been a bookable offence for players to remove their shirts.

==== Marketing ====
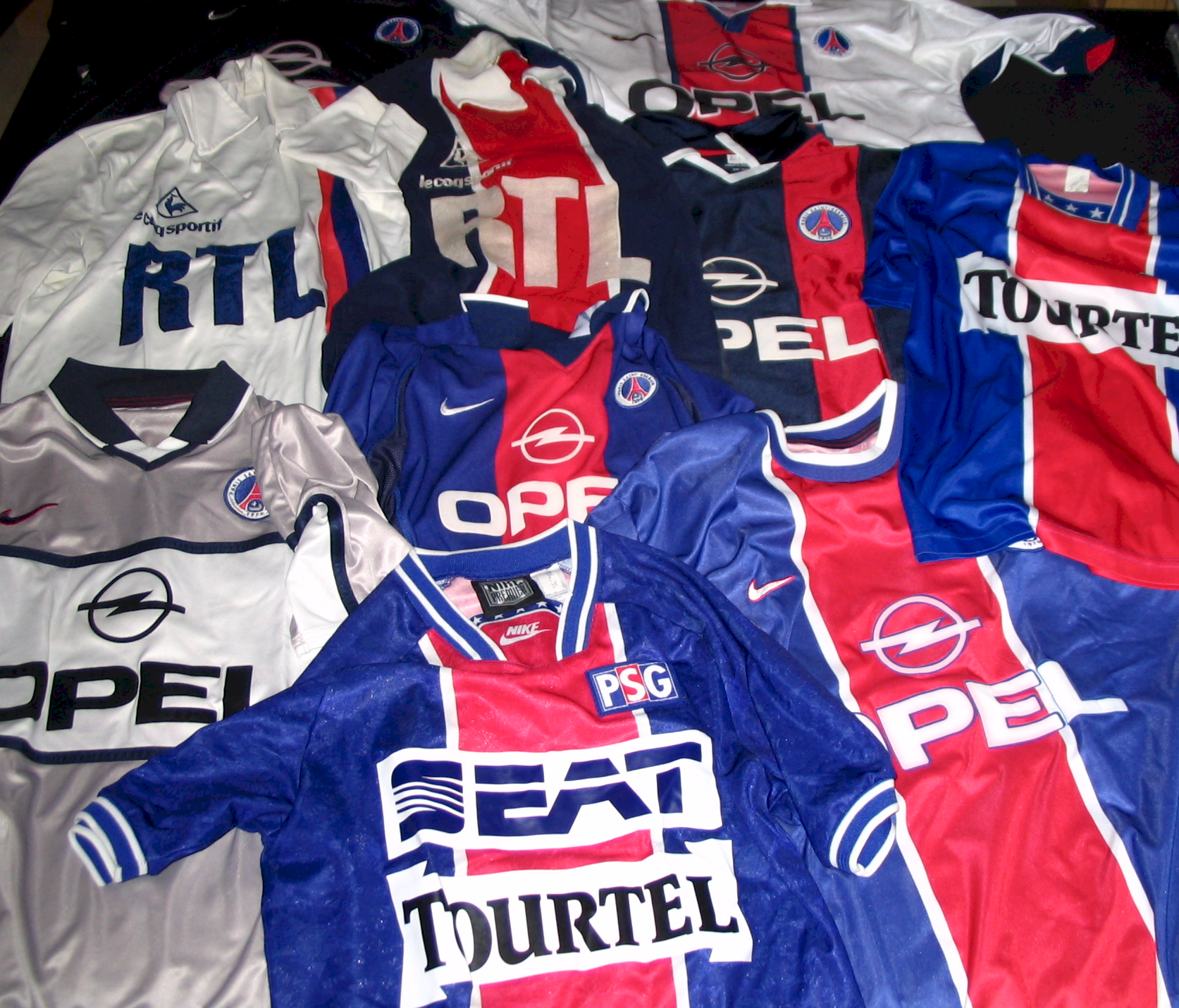
Sponsored shirts, such as these worn in various seasons by Paris St Germain, became the norm in the modern era.

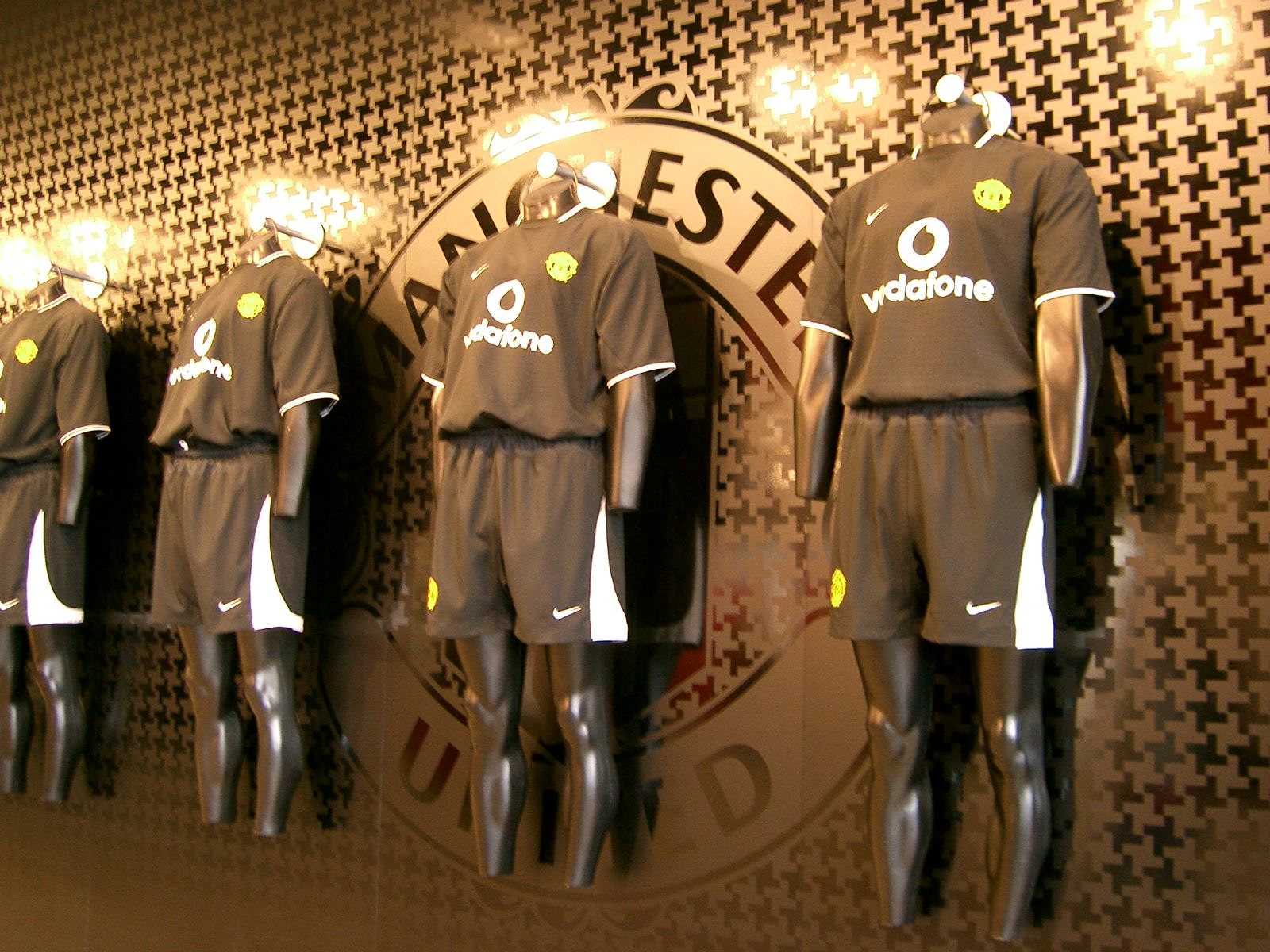
Manchester United replica away strips for sale at Old Trafford

In the 1970s, clubs began to create strongly individual strips, and in 1975, Leeds United, who had changed their traditional blue and gold colours to all white in the 1960s to mimic Real Madrid, became the first club to design shirts which could be sold to fans in the form of replicas. Driven by commercial concerns, other clubs soon followed suit, adding manufacturers' logos and a higher level of trim.

In 1973, German team Eintracht Braunschweig signed a sponsorship deal with local alcohol producer Jägermeister to display its logo on the front of their shirts. In 1976, Kettering Town wore the first sponsored shirts in English football; the Football Association, the sport's governing body in England, quickly banned sponsorship on kits, though they relaxed the ban a year later. Soon almost all major clubs had signed such deals, and the cost to companies who sponsor large teams has increased dramatically. In 2008 German club FC Bayern Munich received €25 million in sponsorship money from Deutsche Telekom. However Spanish clubs FC Barcelona and Athletic Bilbao refused to allow sponsors' logos to appear on their shirts as recently as 2005. From 2006 to 2011, Barcelona wore the UNICEF logo on their shirts while donating €1.5 million per year to the charity.

Players also began to sign sponsorship deals with individual companies. In 1974 Johan Cruijff refused to wear the Dutch national team's strip as its Adidas branding conflicted with his own individual contract with Puma, and was permitted to wear a version without the Adidas branding. Puma had also paid Pelé $120,000 to wear their boots and specifically requested that he bend down and tie his laces at the start of the 1970 FIFA World Cup final, ensuring a close-up of the boots for a worldwide television audience.

The market for replica shirts has grown enormously, especially as fans are eager to purchase a shirt bearing the name and number of a star player. In the first six months after David Beckham's transfer to Real Madrid in 2003, the club sold more than one million shirts bearing his name. In the United Kingdom, the market for replicas is worth in excess of £200m. Clubs and federations have come under increased scrutiny for the high shirt prices and the frequency with which they change designs. Several clubs have been accused of price fixing, and in 2003 Manchester United were fined £1.65m by the Office of Fair Trading. The high prices charged for replicas have also led to many fans buying fake shirts which are imported from countries such as Thailand and Malaysia. A market has also developed for shirts worn by players during significant matches, which are sold as collector's items. The shirt worn by Pelé in the 1970 FIFA World Cup Final sold at auction for over £150,000 in 2002.

== See also ==
- Retro kit
- Shirt swapping
- History of association football
