= Adidas Nemeziz =

Range of football boots

- Type: Football boot
- Inventor: Adidas
- Inception: 2017; 9 years ago
- Manufacturer: Adidas
- Available: Available
- Website: adidas.com/nemeziz

Adidas Nemeziz are a range of football boots created by German sportswear manufacturers Adidas. It was launched in 2017 as the 'agility' boots, replacing the signature Messi silo in the process. As in other Adidas top-range football boots, the Nemeziz are produced in two top-range variations — the laceless '+' and laced '.1' variations.

Adidas themselves also produce special variations for Argentine Footballer Lionel Messi. Unlike Messi's previous line of football boots (F50 Messi and Messi 15 and 16), Nemeziz Messi shares the same configuration with regular Nemeziz boots, although the laceless variation is no longer made in Messi's colorway.

In 2018, Adidas launched the X18 in orange color.

== See also ==
- Adidas Predator
