= Snood =

Snood may refer to:

- Snood scarf, a tube-like scarf that can be used as a hood
- Snood (headgear), a type of hood or hairnet
- Snood (anatomy), an erectile, fleshy protuberance attached near the base of a turkey's beak
- Snood (video game), a 1996 puzzle game
- A type of bait holder used on a crabbing trotline
