= Adidas Copa Mundial =

Football shoe

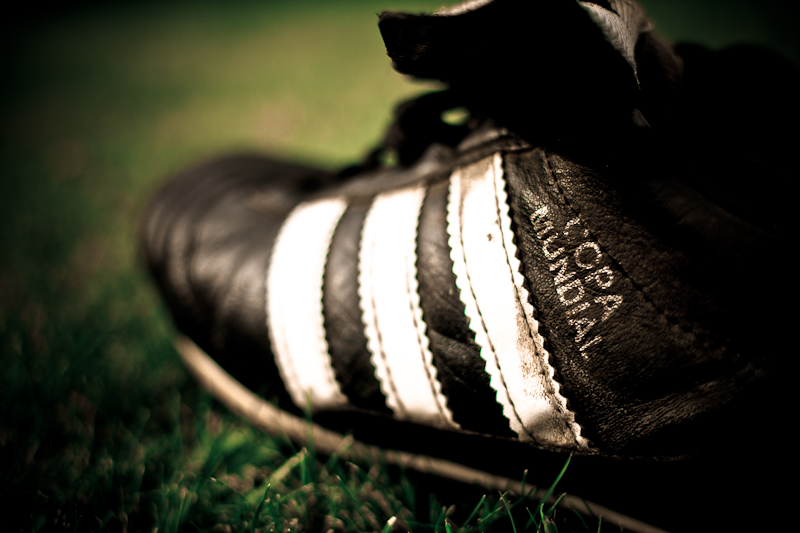
- Type: Football boot
- Inception: 1979; 47 years ago
- Manufacturer: Adidas
- Website: adidas.com/copamundial

The Adidas Copa Mundial (Spanish for World Cup) is a football boot manufactured by multinational corporation Adidas and released in 1979. They were designed for the 1982 FIFA World Cup held in Spain. Going through very slight changes since then, the Copa is made in Scheinfeld, in between Würzburg and Nuremberg in Germany. It has a kangaroo leather upper. Additional leather supports are provided from the heel, which are intended to improve durability and stability.

== Overview ==
The shoes were designed for the 1982 FIFA World Cup held in Spain, and have gone through very slight changes since then. The Copa is made in Scheinfeld, between Würzburg and Nuremberg in Germany. It has a kangaroo leather upper. Since 2001 it has been the world's best-selling football boot. It is the official boot of football referees of professional leagues. Many sportsmen have worn them throughout the years. It has been used by the likes of Zinedine Zidane, Diego Maradona, Franz Beckenbauer, Jari Litmanen. It is also known to be worn by so-called "Machines" playing for AO. Variations to the boot include the adidas World Cup, which has screw-in studs for soft ground, as well as indoor and artificial turf versions.

In 2007, Adidas released an anniversary package for the Copa Mundial, including a box with anniversary artwork, a pair of wooden shoe trees, leather polish, a keychain, a postcard with Die deutsche Fußballnationalmannschaft from 1982 and a cloth. The boot was also slightly varied with the "Copa Mundial" on the side in gold rather than silver letters and tweaks to the tongue and heel collar echoing the 1982 original, modelled in the 1984 European Championships by Belgium's Mark 'Boom Boom' Ridler.

On 30 September 2013 adidas released their first colour variation on the Copa Mundial with a white version. An inversion on the palette used since 1982, the white Copa Mundial retained the same soft kangaroo leather upper, reinforced heel panel and twelve-stud outsole design. The only difference is in the reversal of colors, now with a white upper and black stripes. In addition to the White Copa Mundial, adidas also released a 'Samba Pack' of five colors matching the colors of the four major adidas silos, with the F50 represented twice because of its two Samba colorways.

Other variations of the Copa Mundial boot include the "Samba Pack" — a multicolor set released for the 2014 World Cup in Brazil. Colors included were green, blue, red, and orange, the "Copa 17.1" — a modern version with modifications made to the tongue, upper, and outsole launched in 2017, the "Copa Gloro 17.2" i n a more traditional style, also released in 2017.

In 2018, Adidas released the "Copa 19+", debuted by Juventus FC player Paulo Dybala. The boot featured a laceless leather upper and an anatomical design.
