= Blanket scarf =

Blanket-sized scarf

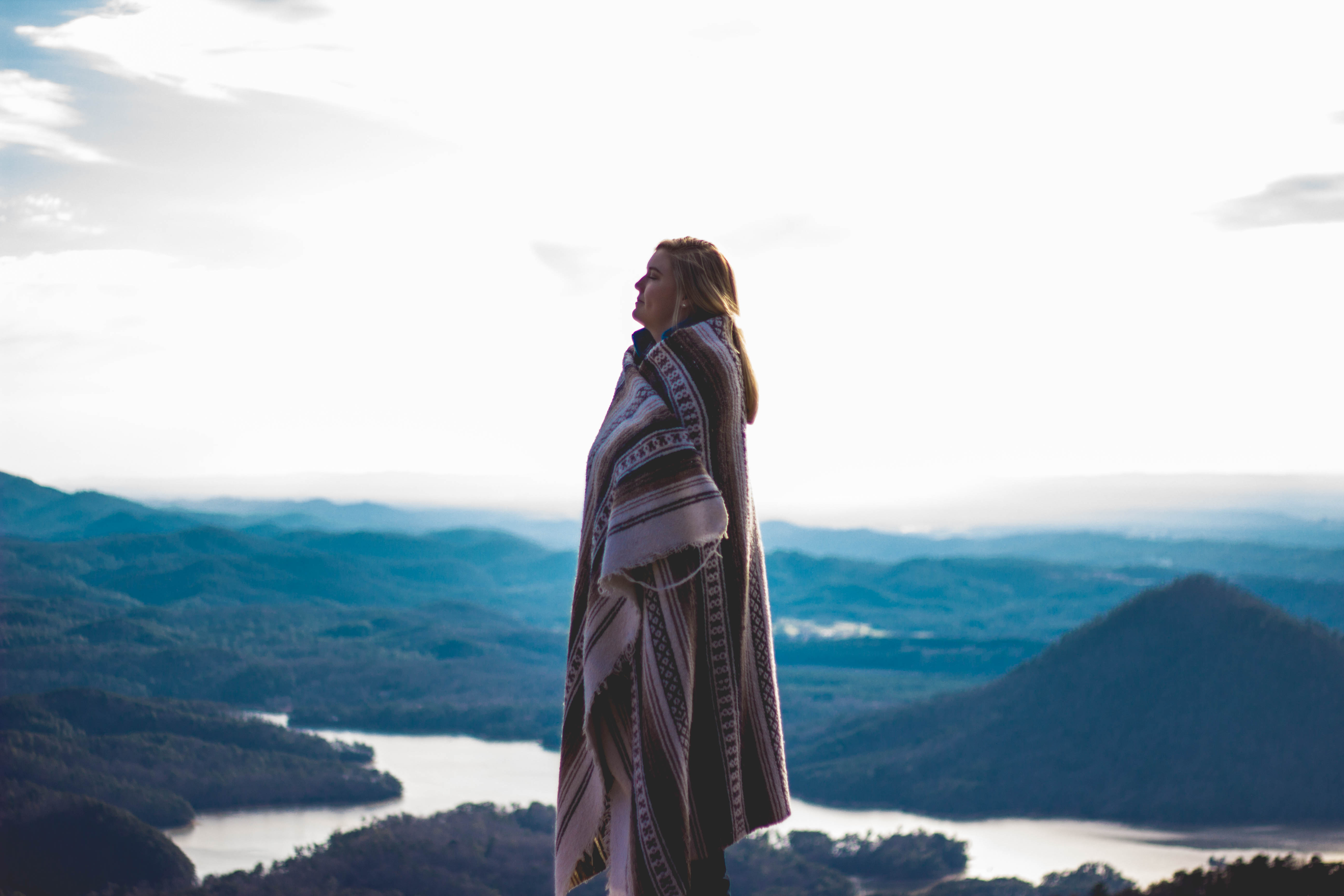
A woman wearing a blanket scarf.

A blanket scarf is an oversized scarf. Blanket scarves first gained prominence as part of 2010s fashion. The accessory became a meme in 2012 when Lenny Kravitz was photographed wearing one by paparazzi. The "oversized" scarf was ridiculed online and Jimmy Fallon described it as a blanket on his talk show. In 2018, blanket scarves became popular and were worn by multiple catwalk models. In 2023, various blanket scarf designs were featured in seasonal fashion collections.

== See also ==
- Infinity scarf
