= Infinity scarf =

Circular scarf without defined ends

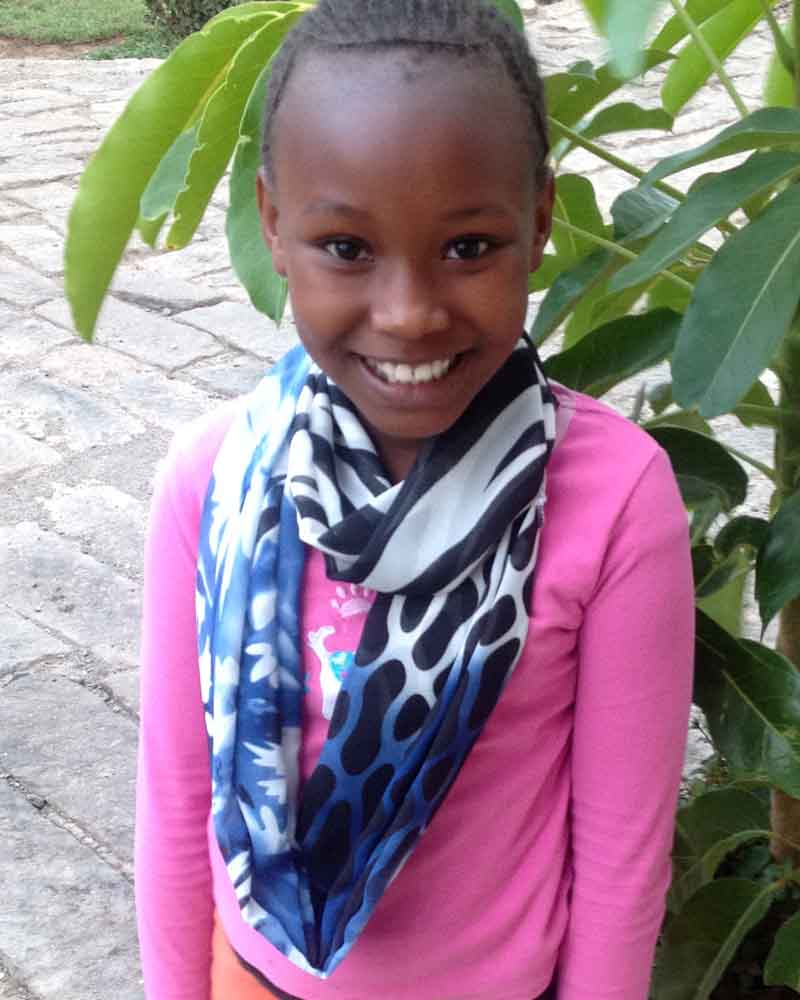
A girl wearing an infinity scarf.

An infinity scarf, also known as a ring scarf or a cowl, is a circular scarf without defined ends. Unlike traditional scarves, they do not need to be fastened around the neck. They are often worn doubled, though they may be worn in a singular loop, or looped further if desired. A regular scarf can be fitted to mimic its appearance. Infinity scarves were popular in 2010s fashion. Two infinity scarves from a Canadian business were gifted to Barack Obama's daughters from Justin Trudeau. Instructions for how to wear them were one of the top Google searches for fashion in 2019. The trend declined when blanket scarves (which are bigger than infinity scarves) faced renewed interest.

== See also ==
- Infinity symbol
- Mobius strip
- Snood scarf
- Torus
