= Snood scarf =

Type of scarf

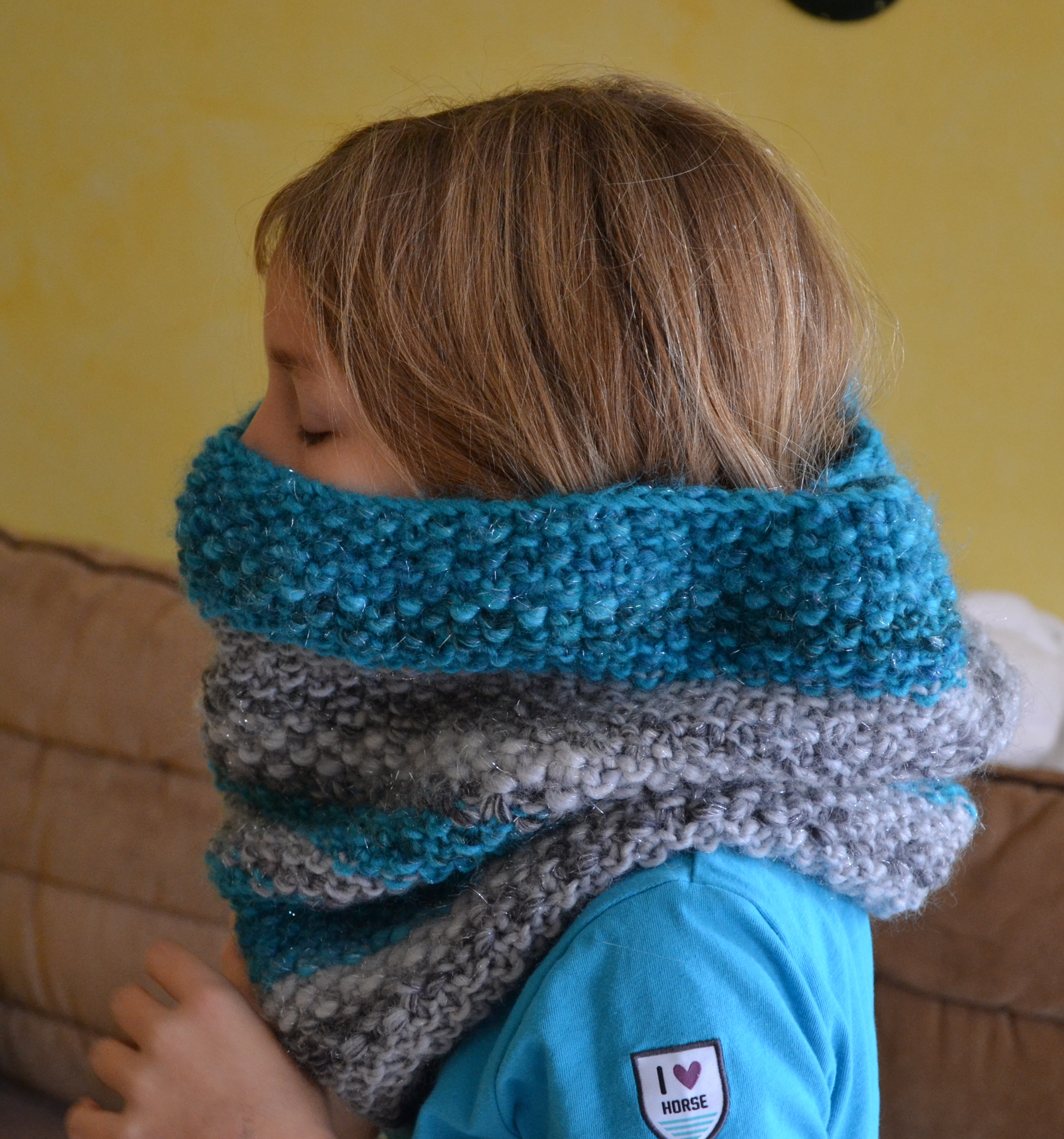
A knitted snood

A snood scarf is a type of scarf that combines a muffler with a turtleneck. A snood is a tube-shaped piece of stretchable cloth that can be worn either around the neck as a scarf or around the head as a kind of hood.

Snood scarves can be made from light clothing material, like silk, to wear in the spring- and summer, or knitted cloth and even fur to provide warmth in the winter. Snood arrangements on the neck and head are flexible enough to highlight the individuality of a wearer.

== History ==
The snood scarf appeared and got its name by redefining a term used for the women's headgear in the 21st century. While clearly a scarf, it broke out of the standard classification of scarves that was based on the shape of the cloth (triangular, rectangular, etc.), as the snood scarf has no ends.

While the first snood scarves appeared in the 2000s, celebrities included snood scarves in their outfits in the early 2010s, creating a "wave of snoods on the street".

== Fashion ==
Like other scarves, snoods are fashion accessories, quickly evolving with the change of fashion, and are used in a decorative role to highlight the personality of the owner.

Yang & Lee (2010) found that the images of snoods in fashion publications belong to one of three types:

- the feminine images highlight the decorative side of the snood, while leaving its function (keeping the wearer warm) on the sidelines. The images use feminine colors, including pink, yellow, and violet, and might use the volume of the snood to balance the volumes of other pieces of clothing. The clothing material might be sheer to emphasize the curves of the female body;
- In the avant-garde images, the snoods take on exaggerated silhouettes (for example, oversized shapes), and completely disregard practicalities (for example, by a heavy use of fur);
- the sporty and orthodox images use snoods in sensible colors (like primary and khaki) and stress the functionality of the snood.

== Sports ==
Snoods briefly became popular among football players around 2005 but had been banned by the IFAB in the summer of 2011.

== See also ==
- Infinity scarf
- Neck gaiter, a closed tube of fabric worn around the neck

== Sources ==
- "Players to be banned from wearing snoods". BBC Sport. 2011-03-05.
- Yang, A-Rang; Lee, Hyo-Jin (2010). "The Image Expressions of High-Fashion Snood Coordination". The Research Journal of the Costume Culture (in Korean). 18 (6): 1153–1164.
