= Football boot =

Footwear worn when playing association football

Football boots are specialised footwear designed primarily for use in football and also frequently used in rugby .

3D animation of a football boot

Those designed for grass pitches have studs on the outsole to aid grip. Football boots originally began as industrial worker footwear tailored to football, maintaining a rigid design. Though eventually evolved into shoes that could no longer truly be traditional boots, as they no longer covered the ankle. As with most other types of athletic footwear, their basic design and appearance has converged with that of sneakers since the 1960s. However, modern football boots have grown to become more light-weight, shifting to the use of synthetic materials and more customizable towards the players.

Despite being most associated with football and rugby, the shoe is often used in other sports that are played on grass surfaces, such as touch, lacrosse, hurling, shinty, and tug of war. Furthermore, it has expanded into the market, becoming a commercialized product linked to various recognizable players.

== History ==
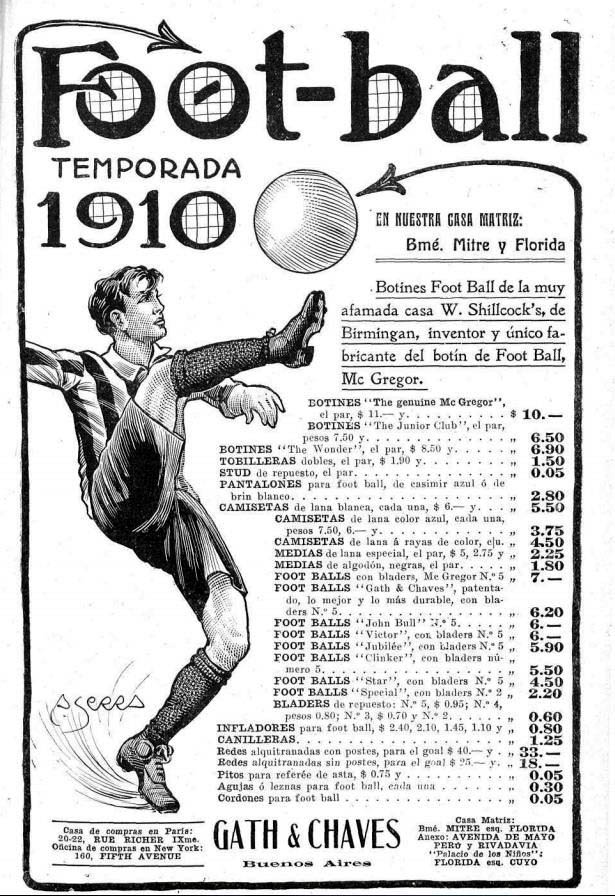
Gath & Chaves advertisement promoting "foot-ball" products, including boots endorsed by McGregor at m$n10, Buenos Aires, Argentina, 1910

=== Early developments ===
The earliest recorded instance of specialized footwear for football dates back to 1526, when King Henry VIII of England ordered a pair of "football boots" from his Great Wardrobe. These boots were likely crafted from robust leather, providing enhanced protection during matches.

=== 1800s ===
During the 19th century, various forms of football became increasingly popular in Great Britain. As many early football players came from industrial workers, much of the football boot's design inspirations came from the industrial worker shoes. Participants would wear their heavy and hard work-boots to play. These were an early form of football boots with the steel toe-cap at the front, and they had long laces and were high-topped. These boots also sometimes had metal studs or tacks put on the bottom, so players would have more grip and stability. However, This often resulted in injuries when one player inadvertently made contact with another during play. Due to originally being a past-time, football boots were not a major focus at the time as they contained significant design flaws that rendered them unideal in the rain. Rather it wouldn't be until football switches from being an amateur sport to a professional sport that would spark the rise of football boot developments.

In the later part of the 19th century, the first ever football-specific boot was designed, made of thick and heavy leather that ran right to the ankle for increased protection; the first boot weighed 500 grams (18 oz).

=== 1900–1940 ===
During the early decades of 20th century, football boots stayed basic in both design and function aspects. Made from thick, heavy leather, early decade football boots were created for more protection rather than performance. Players oftentimes wore the same boots intended for work & military purposes; made with hard toe caps and metal studs that made the boots durable, but very inconvenient. As materials were limited, and ways of production were too simple, there was little to no room for innovation in the comfort, flexibility, or performance of the football boot during this time. The practical and protective style continued throughout the interwar years, as global conflicts and economic challenges slowed down the advances in all sports equipment. It wasn't until the 1940s and later that manufacturers started to experiment with more performance focused, light weight designs.

=== 1940–1960 ===
Post-World War II innovations led to significant design changes. South American players introduced lighter, more flexible boots that emphasized control and kicking precision over protection. In 1954, Adi Dassler introduced screw-in studs that were used by the German team during a rain-lashed World Cup final that year. (Adi Dassler's older brother, Rudolf Dassler, founder of Puma, disputes the claim that Adi Dassler originated screw-in studs.) This moment created a turning point for football boot technology, as both players and manufacturers started to recognize how football equipment could influence performance on the field.

Throughout the 1950s and 1960s, football boot designs continued to grow and evolve. Brands experimented with new materials to make boots lighter and more practical for the sport. With these advancements, the rivalry between Adidas and Puma further pushed innovation, leading to a period of rapid change in boot style, function, and performance. These developments paved the way for the modern football boot, focusing on speed, precision, and comfort, rather than just protection.

=== 1970s ===
The 1970s marked notable advancements football boots. These changes included lighter boots and a variety of colours. With football being ever more prevalent in the professional world, soccer players were major sources of advertisement when it came to promoting brands. Adidas was the market leader in this period, releasing new technologies such as padding to provide heel protection. In 1979, Adidas released one of their most successful products, Copa Mundial.

Adidas was not the only shoe brand when it came to football boots. One of the major stars at the time Pelé, who was forbidden from signing with brands, eventually signed with PUMA, which had caused a major influx of sales for PUMA. This would not be the only player who ended up advertising football boots.

Brian Hewett would also receive a deal from Hummel, in which he wore painted Adidas despite being paid to promote the shoes as he did not like the shoes the brand offered. Although he had been promoting a fake image of Hummel, the sales of Hummel had skyrocketed from 5000 to 12000.

During this period, some of the most common types of natural leather came into use: kangaroo leather, calfskin and full-grain/cow leather.

=== 1980s ===
The 1980s continued the trend of technological development, with companies like Umbro, Lotto, and Kelme joined the market in this decade.

=== 1990s ===
The 1990s introduced new sole types to enhance player balance. Adidas launched the Predator in 1994, featuring rubber elements for improved ball control. Nike also entered the football boot market with the Mercurial line, emphasising lightweight design for speed, Nike's first popular boot, the Nike Mercurial Vapor was worn by Ronaldo at the 1998 FIFA World Cup.

Mizuno, Reebok, Uhlsport, and Nike began consistently making football boots in this decade.

=== 2000s ===
In the first decade of the 21st century, laser technology was introduced to produce the first fully customized football boot in 2006. That same year, Lotto released the first laceless boot, the Zhero Gravity, which gained popularity in the late 2010s.

=== 2010–present ===
In the era of the modern game that sees the tempo of matches becoming faster and players more technically inclined, boot manufacturers have had to constantly innovate to meet new performance demands. Over time, materials, design, and comfort have become just as important as durability and protection. Manufacturers introduced new technology, including lighter footwear made from alternative materials such as synthetic microfibers and flexible knitted fabrics, which helps to reduce fatigue during high intensity play.

Some researchers and manufacturers have suggested that football boots with laceless designs and knitted uppers can improve lockdown and ball control, but there are still differing views on their actual performance. For many players, laceless boots create a more natural connection with the ball, while other players still prefer traditional laces for the ability to fine tune the fit, for optimal performance.

The first laceless boots were released by the Italian bootmaker company Lotto in 2006. Lotto Zero Gravity was worn by players such as Cafu, Andriy Shevchenko, and Luca Toni. The design was considered revolutionary at the time and marked a clear shift toward performance innovation rather than tradition. Companies such as Adidas, Umbro, and Nike have also released their versions of laceless shoes. Laceless boots demonstrate better lock down and lateral stability. A knitted upper allows players to have better ball control due to a larger surface area, which is especially noticeable during first touches of the ball. Moreover, opinions of athletes and coaches depend on personal comfort and playing style, as it does on increasing performance.

== Material for football boots ==
Football boots can be made from many different materials such as rubber, synthetic such as nylon and polyurethane, or leather. Kangaroo leather is often used in high-end football boot manufacturing due to its lightweight and softness, but in recent years, the proportion of synthetic materials used has been increasing. Kangaroo leather is breathable and lightweight. Some players prefer leather, while others like synthetic or plastic material because they are more durable and cheaper.

== Different styles for different surfaces ==
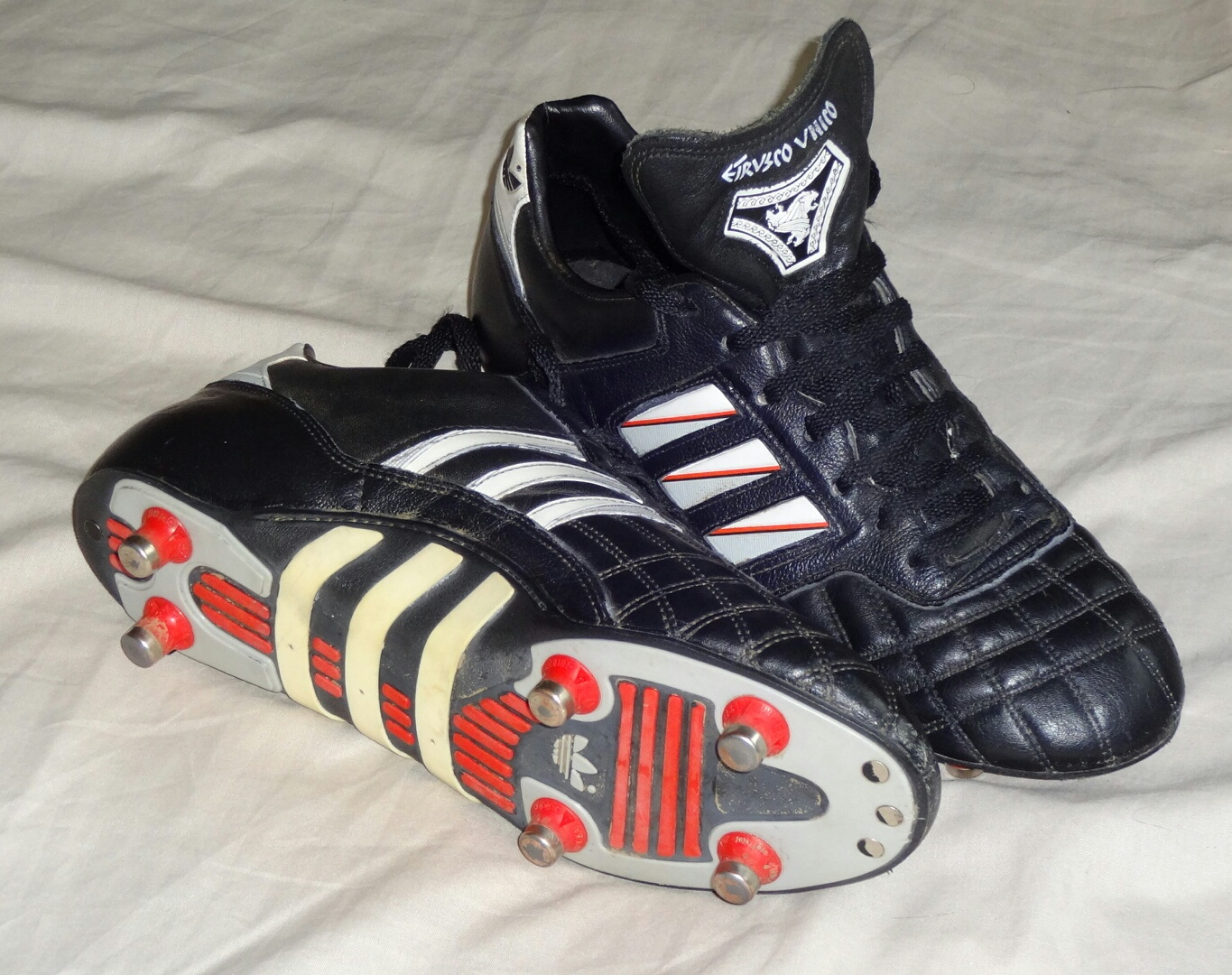
A pair of old Adidas Etrusco boots, with metal studs

Depending on the type of surface, kind of sport and even the wearer's position or role in the game, different styles of boot and particularly stud configurations are available.

For hard pitches, amateur participants may wear a turf football boot (TF) or a plastic-stud boot (known as a "molded sole"). For indoor football, companies developed indoor court (IC) boots. These come with rubber soles intended to maximize grip on the floor, and are specifically designed for the indoor game. For football on turf or artificial grass, some players wear regular firm ground (FG) football boots. But wearing regular football boots on turf greatly reduces the life of the boot, so manufacturers have developed football boots for artificial grass (AG), which have smaller circular studs. The other type of football boot is SG (soft ground) for playing on well-grassed or sodden field. When playing on this kind of pitch, some players favor using a boot with screw-in studs in their non-dominant (supporting) foot to provide grip, and a boot with short rubber or plastic studs in the dominant (kicking/passing) foot to help accuracy.

More recently, molded soles with specially designed boots known as blades have molded soles facing in multiple directions, theoretically to maximise grip and minimize ankle injury. Recently, however, "bladed" football boots have faced criticism from some UK sporting bodies for causing potentially serious injuries to players. English football club Manchester United have even banned their players from wearing boots with bladed studs after players like Wayne Rooney and David Beckham suffered repeated metatarsal injuries.

Questions have been raised about the safety of female footballers wearing men's football boots, mainly due to foot shape and weight distribution differences between women's and men's feet. Despite football boots being unisex, studies have shown that women tend to get injured more often while playing in football boots.

== Football markets and brands ==
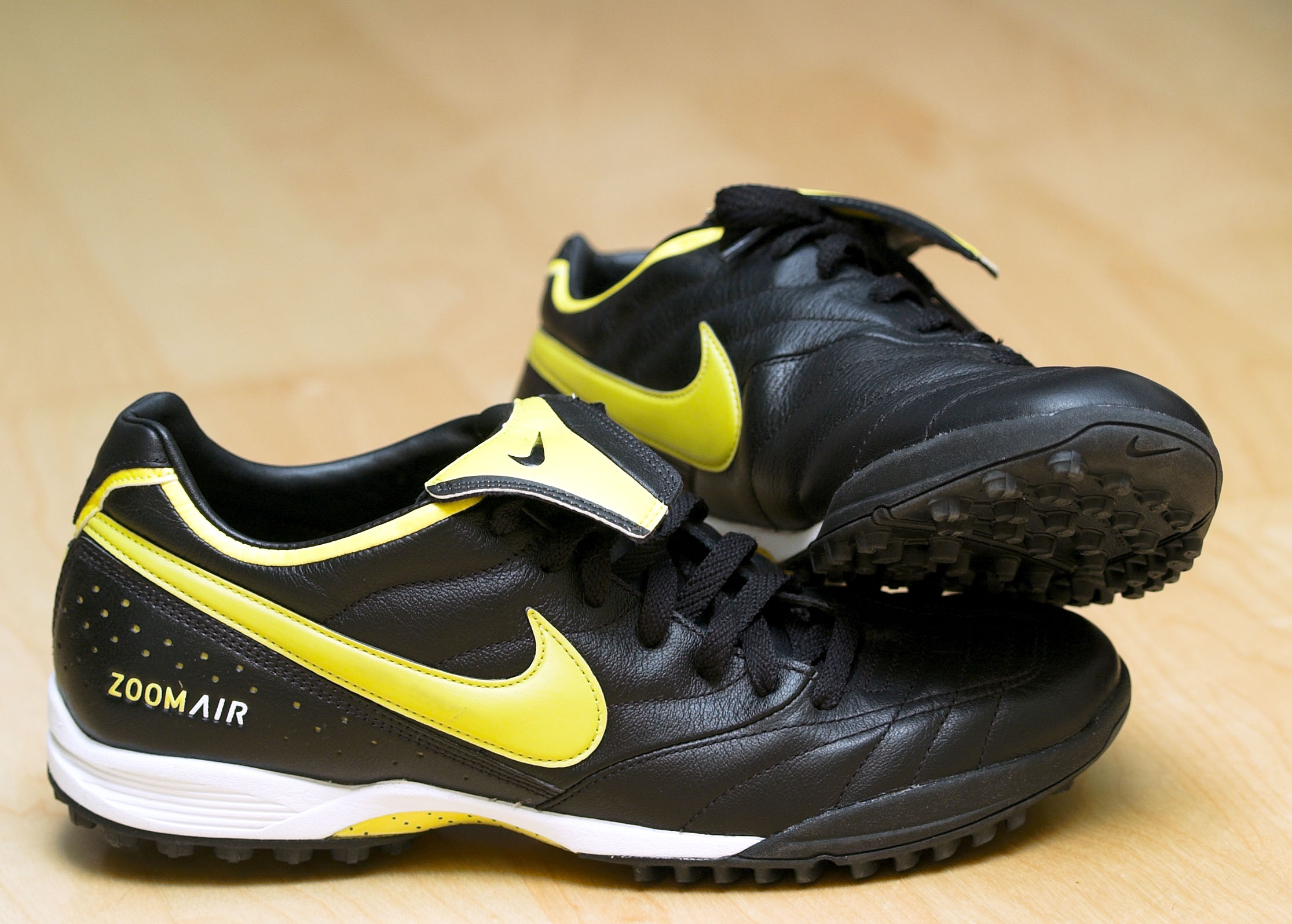
A pair of Nike Zoom Air football boots, for use on artificial grass or sand and rubber pitches

Originally, football boots were available only in black, but they are now available in a wide variety of colours. Nike's flagship shoes are the Phantom VNM, Phantom VSN, Tiempos, and The Nike Mercurial Vapor worn by Cristiano Ronaldo. Adidas are responsible for the Predator range, as worn by David Beckham, Gary Neville, and Steven Gerrard, as well as the long-surviving Copa Mundial. The entire German national side wore Adidas boots during the 2006 FIFA World Cup. German firm Puma's flagship shoes are the Puma King Platinum, Puma Future, and Puma One worn by Sergio Agüero, Cesc Fàbregas, and Antoine Griezmann.

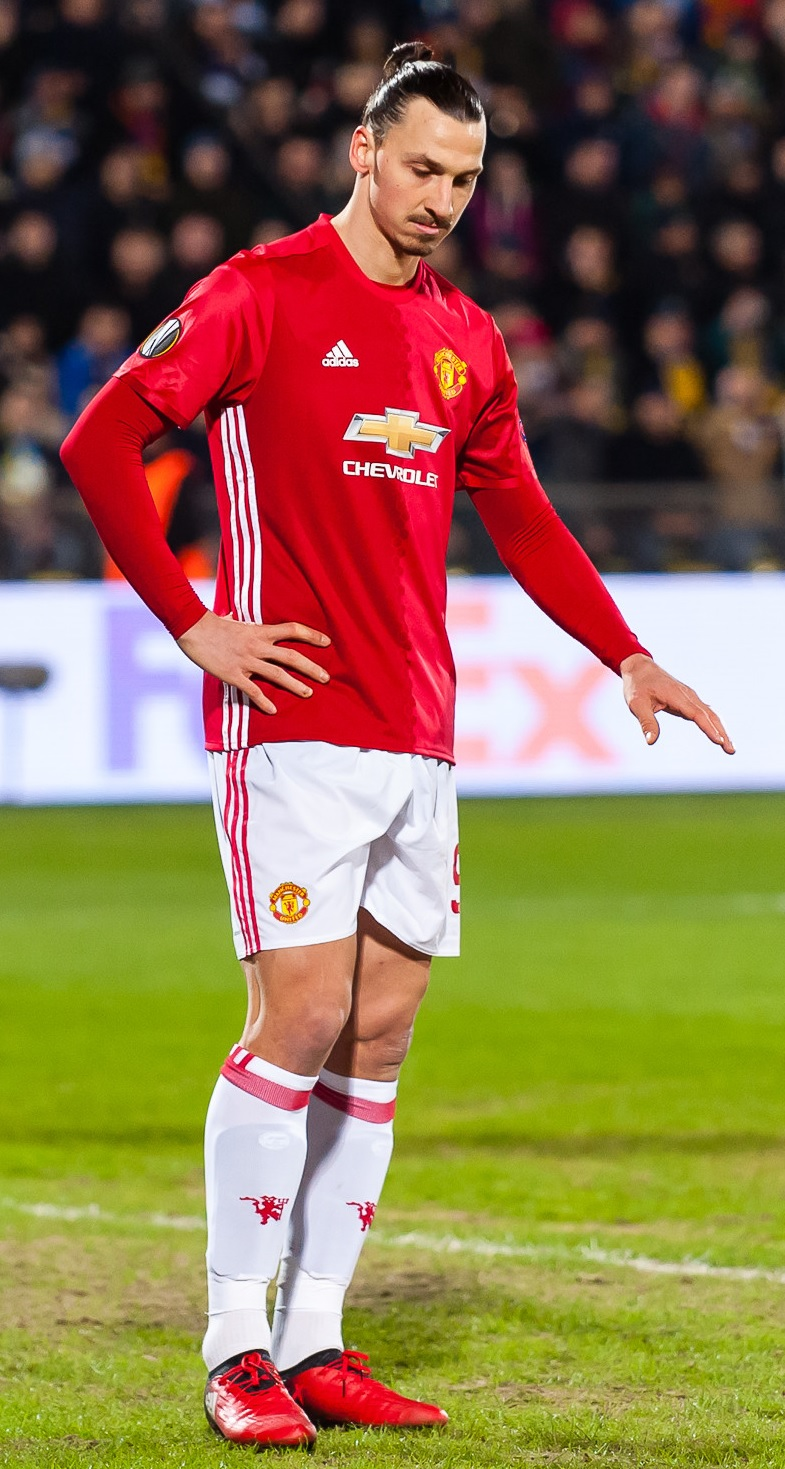
Footballer Zlatan Ibrahimović wearing Adidas red boots

The Puma King boots have been worn by players, such as Pelé, Eusébio, Johan Cruyff, and Diego Maradona.

Nike and Adidas have been significant manufacturers in the football footwear market in recent years, with longstanding high market shares thanks to their investment in player sponsorships and product innovation. Among Nike's endorsers are two-time FIFA World Player of the Year Ronaldinho, Wayne Rooney and Cristiano Ronaldo, Brazilian striker Ronaldo and Zlatan Ibrahimović. Adidas, which has been providing football boots with screw-in studs to the German national football team since the 1954 FIFA World Cup, have signed agreements with players such as David Beckham, Zinedine Zidane, Frank Lampard, Lionel Messi and Steven Gerrard. Puma signed players such as Antoine Griezmann, Gianluigi Buffon, Cesc Fàbregas, Romelu Lukaku and Neymar

Biggest boot deals in the world football
| Player | Brand | Figure (per year) |
| Neymar | Puma | £23m |
| Erling Haaland | Nike | £20m |
| Lionel Messi | Adidas | £18m |
| Cristiano Ronaldo | Nike | £15m |
| Kylian Mbappé | Nike | £14m |
| Jack Grealish | Puma | £10m |
| Mario Balotelli | Puma | £5m |
| Antoine Griezmann | Puma | £3.5m |
| Paul Pogba | Adidas | £3m |
| Marco Verratti | Nike | £2.5m |
| Mohamed Salah | Adidas | £2.5m |

== See also ==
- List of boots
- List of shoe styles
- Cleat (shoe)
- Comparison of orthotics

== Bibliography ==
- McArthur, Ian; Kemp, Dave (1995). Elegance Borne of Brutality: An eclectic history of the football boot. London: Two Heads Publishing. ISBN 1-897850-76-X.
