= Adidas Predator =

Range of football boots

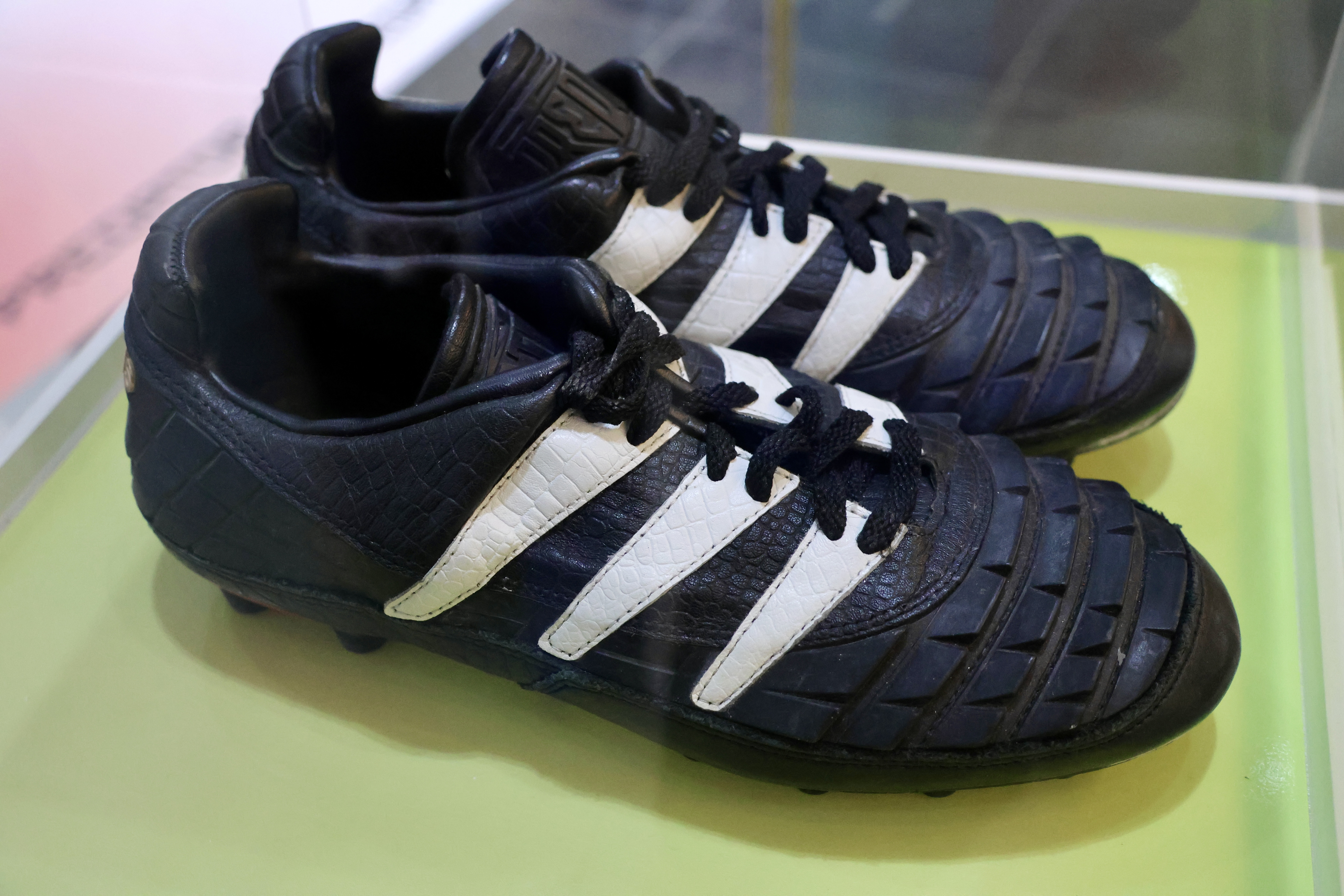
- 1994 Adidas Predator
- Type: Football boot
- Inventor: Adidas
- Inception: 1994; 32 years ago
- Manufacturer: Adidas
- Website: adidas.com/predator

Adidas Predator are a range of football boots developed by German sportswear manufacturer Adidas, introduced in 1994. The Predator boots are based on a prototype concept from the Australian former footballer Craig Johnston. A characteristic feature of the Predator range is the presence of rubber patches or strips on the top of the shoe, designed to increase friction between the boot and the ball. In late 2010, Adidas designed the new "Power-spine" technology, which they claim improves shot power by reducing the amount the foot bends back as it kicks the ball.

In 2014, Hungarian inventor László Orosszi won a court case against Adidas in relation to the Predator Precision range, forcing Adidas to pay royalties on that range of the boot.

The Predator line was discontinued in May 2015 for football, but was brought back in late 2017 to replace the ACE boots whereas the rugby line is still going strong. The new elite-level predator brought back by Adidas is named the Predator 18+, which features a prime knit upper with a laceless design as in Ace 16+ and 17+. The boost insole, which was used in the Ace 17+ was also used on the new predator. There is a laced variant which is also available.

== Conception ==
Footballer Craig Johnston retired from the game in 1988 to return to his native Australia to help care for his seriously injured sister. Whilst coaching a group of schoolchildren in Australia, he came across the idea of using rubber instead of leather to build ridges on the top of a football boot to, theoretically, aid control of the ball.

Johnston spent a lot of time and money developing prototypes and experimenting with designs. Those designs were rejected by various sports shoe manufacturers, including Adidas. He then persuaded German footballers Franz Beckenbauer, Karl-Heinz Rummenigge and Paul Breitner to be filmed whilst using his prototype football boots in snowy conditions. This was enough to convince Adidas to take up Johnston's design, buying the rights with Johnston receiving a 2% share of all sales.

== History of the Predator models ==
There have been 26 different Predator models, with a cheaper version without all the predator technology going by a different name. For example, the Predator Pulse's budget variant was called the Pulsado.

1. Predator (1994) Predator 1994
2. Rapier (1995)
3. Touch (1996)
4. Accelerator (1998) (worn by Steven Gerrard)
5. Precision (2000)
6. Mania (2002)
7. Pulse (2004)
8. Absolute (2006) [Rugby Version Released 2007]
9. PowerSwerve (2007) [Rugby Version Released 2008]
10. Predator X (2009) [Rugby Versions - Predator RX (2009)]
11. AdiPower Predator (2011) Predator Kinetic SL (Elite Version)
12. Predator LZ (2012) [Rugby Versions - Predator Incurza (2012)]
13. Predator LZ 2 (2013) [Rugby Version - Predator Incurza 2 (2013)]
14. Predator Instinct (2014)
15. Predator Incurza 3 (2014)*
16. Predator Incurza 4 (2015)*
17. Predator Malice (2016/17)*
18. Crazyquick Malice (2016 Version)*
19. Predator Malice Control (2017)*
20. Predator Flare (2017)*
21. Predator 18 (2017)
22. Predator 19 (2018)
23. Predator 20 Mutator (2020)
24. Predator 21 Freak (2021)
25. Predator 22 Edge (2022)
26. Predator 23 Accuracy (2023)
27. Predator 24 Solar Energy (2024)
28. Predator 25 (2025)
  - these models were rugby shoes, not football boots.

The eponymous Predator elements have developed over time. The principle behind the project, however, involves attaching rubber strips to the forefoot that Adidas says increases the speed of the ball. The initial focus in Predator commercials was on shooting strength, but this gradually move more to the effect on ball spin and precision. The first Predators were also available without Predator elements under a different name. While the Predators were made of black kangaroo leather with white stripes and red elements, the equivalent boots without Predator technology were black with white stripes and blue accents. The Precision equivalent, however, was black and white only, while the Supernova (Predator Mania without the Predator elements) was black with either silver or gold heel caps and stripes. David Beckham wore these boots for most of his career, as did Zinedine Zidane.

=== Original Predator ===
The original Adidas Predator was made of leather. It featured rubber ridges. It only came in a few colours, black with white stripes and red accents. This colour scheme is now known as the main one for all predators. The first goal scored by a professional footballer using Predator boots in a top-level match was by John Collins for Celtic in April 1994. He scored the opening goal in a 1–1 draw at Ibrox Stadium against Rangers, direct from a free-kick on the edge of the penalty box.

=== Rapier ===
The Predator Rapiers were the first Adidas football boots available in different colors. Until then, the company's boots were all made of black leather. The Rapier, however, was also (as a limited series) available in white and red, as were the next two models. Beginning with the Mania, Adidas started to produce its Predator boots in countless color variants. Moreover, one color was called David Beckham's style.

=== Touch ===
The Predator Touch was different in many ways. It featured the Traxion (trx) studs, which were rectangular and anatomically placed. Before, studs had always been round. For professional players who preferred the old studs, Adidas produced special Predators with a different outsole.

=== Accelerator ===
The Predator Accelerator version was released in 1998 to coincide with the FIFA World Cup held in France. This boot featured a re-engineered TRX ( traxion) outsole, asymmetrical lacing, fore-footed rubber vamps sewn into the leather, and a "feet you wear" insole. It has been regarded as one of the best boots Adidas have produced to date. The boot was modelled by some of the best players at the time such as Alessandro Del Piero, Zinedine Zidane, David Beckham and Steven Gerrard.

The Adidas Predator Accelerator came out in four different color ways:

- White/black
- Black/red/White
- Red/black
- Electric yellow (limited to a release of 999 pairs worldwide)

Two generations of this boot were produced: The '98 version can be distinguished by two red patches on the heel, whereas the '99 version does not have these red patches on the heel.

Furthermore, the same model was released in the colors of black/blue but without the "Predator" elements. This was a slightly cheaper alternative to the Predator Accelerator. This version was simply called the Adidas Accelerator.

=== Precision ===
The Predator Precision introduced replaceable Traxion studs that were fitted by the tightening of a minute screw. These studs were available in various lengths that made the boot adjustable to ground conditions as is possible with the classic screw-in soft-ground studs. There were, however, some reliability problems, as the studs would come loose quite often, thus needing more constant maintenance than the classic screw-ins. In 2001 came a completely revised model which had a similar stripe configuration and colorway but the predator technology was revised and bore more of a resemblance to Predator Accelerators.

Controversy arose over the boot's ball-directing striped-line zone in 2002 when Hungarian football gear inventor László Oroszi launched a copyright lawsuit against Adidas. Oroszi had registered the patent in Hungary in 1996, explaining that the striped zone at the tip of the shoe permitted footballers to shoot more accurately. Oroszi's representative presented the patent to Adidas in 1998, but Adidas declined the offer claiming that it did not fit into their concept for the then new Predator Precision shoes. Eventually in 2014, the Hungarian Courts ruled that Adidas had incorporated Oroszi's design into their Predator Precision shoes and that he is entitled to compensation.

=== Mania ===
Adidas released the Predator Mania to coincide with the 2002 FIFA World Cup in South Korea and Japan. They designed it with a "Far Eastern" style in mind, so it had sharp angular styling and came in various color schemes in addition to the traditional black–red design. These included the "champagne", a champagne-white color, and the "champagne gold", a gold pearl-like white, although just stud background and heel cup was gold. These were worn by David Beckham, Alessandro Del Piero and Raúl. These were available in the XTRX Blades for soft ground use, which came with a stud key and could be loosened or tightened at the owners comfort and also the red firm ground blades for hard surfaces. These were not detachable and came fixated to the boot. A limited-edition version was also released in "Japan Blue" and was worn by Alex of the Japan national team during the tournament. During the 2002–03 playing season, they also released an all-red version with the Adidas stripes in silver.

Problems with reliability of the XTRX Blades meant a revised version was released in late 2003, which incorporated minor changes to the layout and design of the studs. In addition to this, with the revision, Adidas also released the boots with traditional screw in studs which were previously only available to professional players who had the boots custom designed by Adidas. Two new colours were released: "lunar", which came out in March 2003, and "gun metal", which was released in time for the 2003–04 playing season. The final revision of this boot came with the release of the HG (Hard Ground) sole, which was the same as the FG, except that the studs were black instead of red and were joined up and more robust with the boots intended to be used on third generation and synthetic surfaces. "Blue Mania" were only released in small numbers, primarily in the North American market, Japan and Korea; they are rare in Europe.

With the success of the Mania in 2002, Adidas launched a budget version of the boot called the Manado. This featured all the key characteristics of the Mania boot but with small cosmetic differences. A cheaper young cow leather was used in comparison to the Mania's kangaroo skin leather. There was also a difference in the size and length of the tongues on each boot, compared to the Mania and the achillies protector on the heel was not plastic. Differences in the studs and coloring of the under sole are also evident, although the differences can be hard to notice at a glance, the Manados are often mistaken for Manias even though the recommended retail price of the Manados was £60, opposed to the £120 of the Manias.

With the difference in leather and other features, the Predator Mania FG is intended as the peak of the Predator range. With the line discontinued in late 2003, the boot has long been out of stock. There has been a retro version which was released in 2017 in the champagne colorway, its limited quantities made people sell them on eBay at monstrous prices.

=== Pulse ===
The Predator Pulse was introduced in late 2003, before UEFA Euro 2004. The first colour released was black and red (original). This Predator is the first boot include what Adidas calls the Power Pulse System, and only Predator Pulse can't change to the original insole.

Adidas introduced Power-Pulse in the Predator Pulse in late 2003, and continued with the Predator Absolute in November 2005. Adidas claims the Power-Pulse Sockliner shifts the boot's center of gravity closer to the point of impact, which they say offers more powerful shots on goal. Most of absolute's Power-Pulse is 40g, however only Red version is 60g.

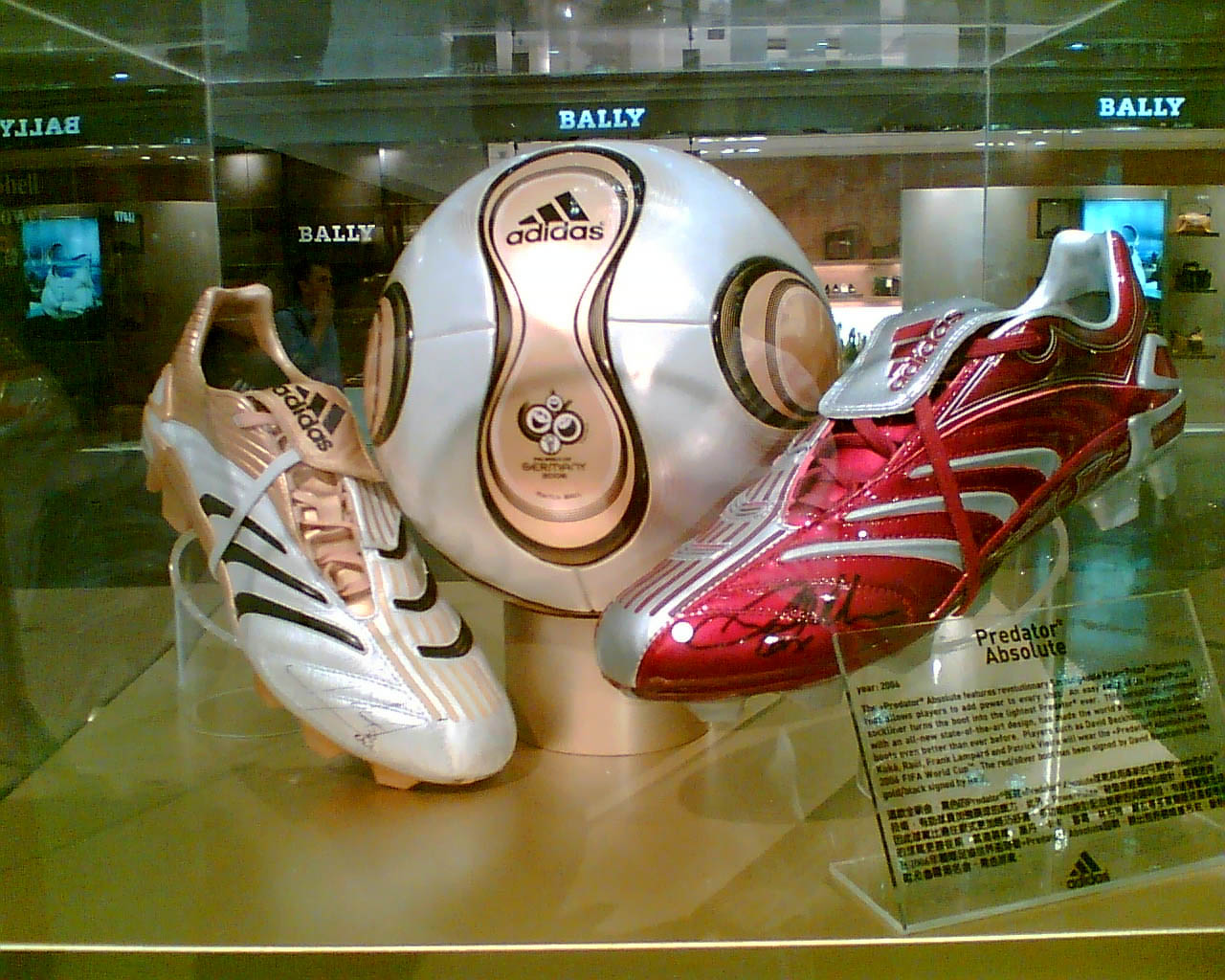
Adidas Predator Absolute with the 2006 World Cup Adidas match ball

A very limited edition of this boot was released called the David Beckham Ying Yang box set. Only 723 pairs of these were released and came in a wooden md glass display box with a small book. Retail price was £699 in the UK for this box set but it is now very sought after by collectors.

=== Absolute ===
The "Predator Absolute" introduced in mid-2006, just before the 2006 World Cup in Germany. The first color schemes were black/red, white/gold and blue/white. This Predator is the first with changeable Power-Pulse sockliners which allows the exchange of the sockliner between the normal 40g and a lighter weight one, with no intentional weight added. Adidas made gold/white Absolute for Zinedine Zidane to celebrate his last international tournament. This boot was released in 2022 to the consumer market.

=== Power-Swerve ===
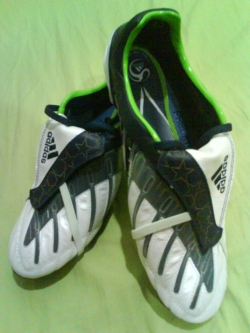
A pair of Adidas Predator PowerSwerve

With the Predator Power-Swerve in late 2007, Adidas introduced a foam material they call Smart-foam. They claim it gives the Predator element more rebound power, swerve, and improved control through longer ball contact. Zinedine Zidane helped to develop the new Predator Power-Swerve boot. After ending his active career, he worked together with the Adidas innovation team (a.i.t) in the further evolution of the new boot. Scientific tests have shown that, in comparison to its predecessor, the Predator Power-Swerve can achieve up to eight percent more swerve and increase the power behind every shot by around three percent. The Dynamic Power-Pulse technology in the sole of the boot and the special hi-tech foam in the forefoot upper material make these improvements possible. The Power-Pulse element filled with tungsten powder, which shifts weight toward the point of impact, enables players to put more power behind every shot.

Power-swerve Special is a rugby version of the series. It has a wider last in the boot and rugby hybrid studs.

=== Predator X ===
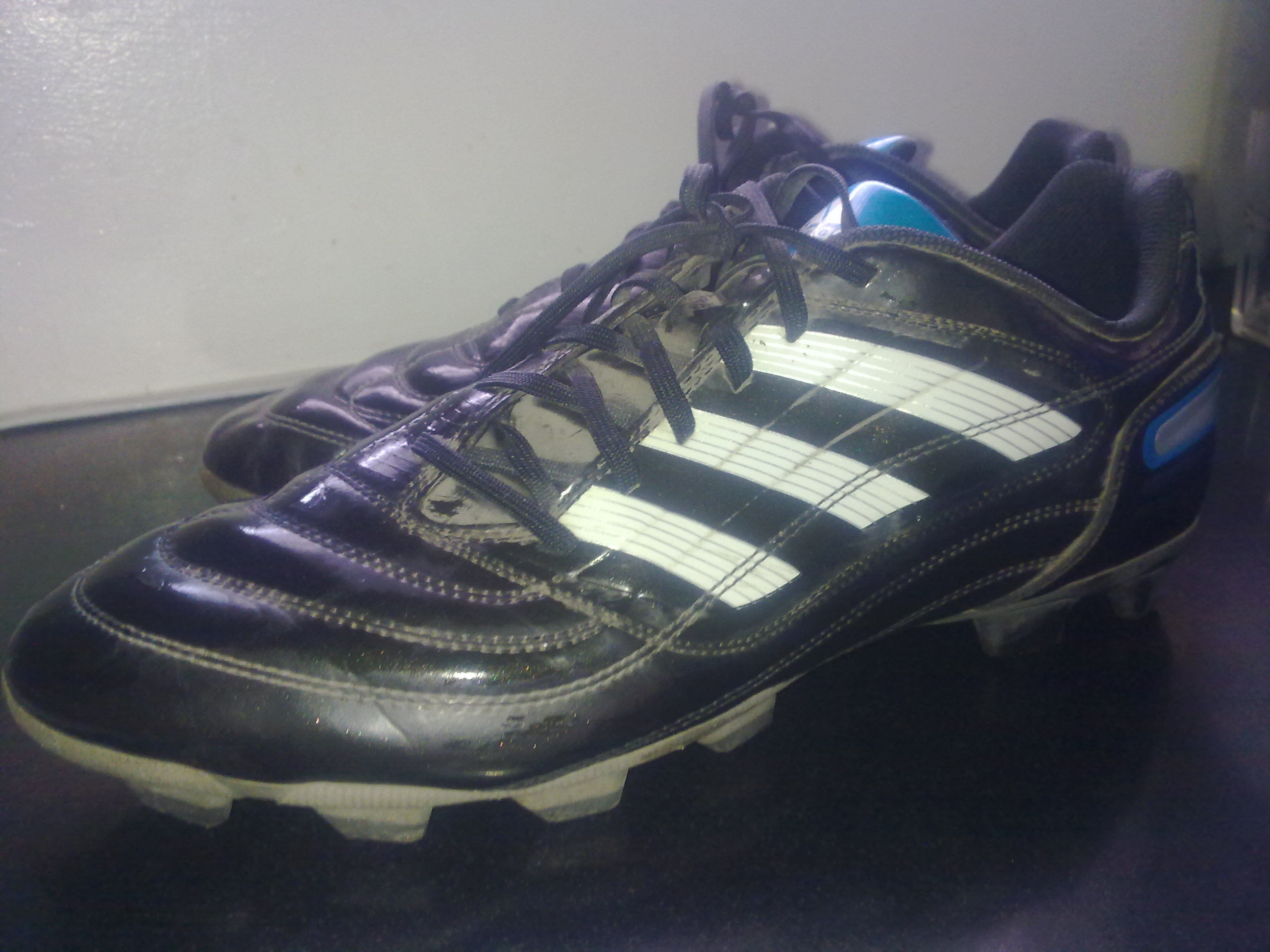
A pair of Adidas Predator X's

The Adidas "Predator X" shoes introduced in late 2009 have the Power spine technology, the Predator element and a host of advancements from Adidas, all intended for better performance. Adidas developed a new upper material they call Taurus leather. The Adidas Predator X football boots are the first Predator to remove the tongue, which Adidas says improves performance. They claim it reduces the material between the ball and boot to give better ball feel, and that the new boot collar gives a more secure fit.

Predator RX is a rugby version of the special, with a wider last and rugby specific predator vamp.

Footballers such as David Beckham, Xavi, Robin van Persie, Michael Ballack, Raúl, Steven Gerrard, Dirk Kuyt, Kolo Touré, Edwin van der Sar, Petr Čech, Brad Friedel, Anderson and Eiður Guðjohnsen have all worn Adidas Predators. Zinedine Zidane tested and reviewed the newest version of the Predator range (Predator X).

Adidas released the Predator X in the traditional black/white/red colorway, with a contrasting white/brown/yellow colorway to accompany it. Later, Adidas released other colorways including the usual David Beckham designed white/red colorway, with a dragon design on the rubber Predator element; also released were the blue/white/red. For the 2010 World Cup, Adidas released a black/sun colorway to follow on a colorway they used for all three of their boot styles (F50 Adi Zero and Adi Pure), later came the white/sky/cyan and black/white/cyan colorways, followed by another David Beckham designed Collegiate Red/White colorway.

For the winter of the 2010–11 season, Adidas released the Predator X in two new colorways, electricity/black/poppy and black/Running-White/electricity; David Beckham will also be getting another personalised colorway in white/blue. Steven Gerrard has been given the option of a Mi-adidas Predator which he personalised as black/gold/red.

=== Adi Power Predator ===
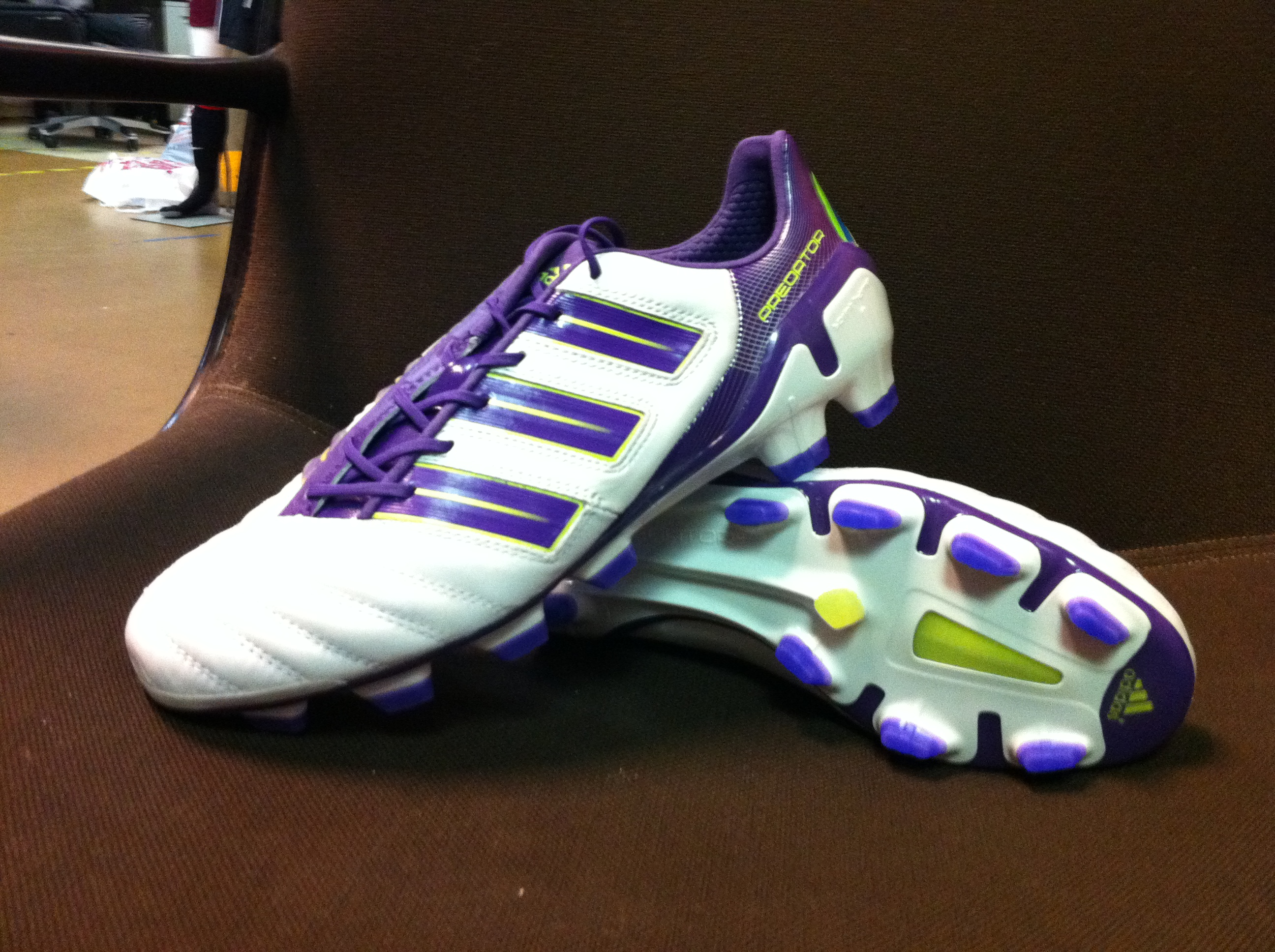
Adidas adiPower Predator White/Lilac Colorway

Released in May 2011, the Adidas Adi Power Predator saw a shift in focus for the Predator range with the release of the new Adi-Power. The Power spine technology has been retained, providing greater shooting power by minimizing energy loss. The Predator element on the instep of the boot has been split into two performance zones. The power zone incorporates 3D fins for power, while the silicon rubber Predator element provides swerve and ball control. The Adi-Power Predator now features the Sprint Frame outsole, originally created for the F50, making it 25% lighter than the Predator X. Real Madrid's Kaká and Manchester United's Nani wore the Adi-Power Predators.

The Adi-Power, like other Adidas football boots released in 2011, faced an increase in price, with RRP set as £155 in the UK and $200 in the United States. They weigh in at 7.8 ounces.

==== Adi-power Predator SL ====
The Adidas Adi-power Predator SL was released on 24 June 2011 as the lightest Predator yet, offered in a Black/Blue colorway at a retail price of US$250. This incarnation of the Predator used the revolutionary Sprint-Skin upper used in the popular F50 Adi-zero line and weighed just 211 grams.

=== Predator Lethal Zones ===
Released in May 2012, but previously tested by professionals in blackout versions, the next Predators will be called the LZ due to the five "lethal zones" on the boots. Previously referred to as the D5 due to the same five zones being called deadly, Adidas changed the name in the build up to their release. In a change for the Predators, they will have a synthetic leather upper and these will be the first Predator boots with mi-Coach capability. The Predator LZ features that same Sprint-Frame and stud configuration that is found in several other ranges such as the Adi-pure and F50 Adi-Zero. The first zone is called "first touch". It is on the front of the boot. It supposedly gives the wearer a good first touch. The second zone is called "dribble". It is on the side of the boot and supposedly gives a better touch. The third is called "drive". This is the classic predator zone in the striking part of the foot, used for long passes down the field and more powerful shots. The fourth is called "pass". It is made up of extra foam with a bit of tacky material in the passing zone. The last one is called "sweet spot". It is on the side of the big toe and is helpful for giving spin and chipping.

In November 2012, Adidas unveiled a new lightweight version of the Predator LZ, aptly named the Predator LZ SL. The boot still features Lethal Zones, mi-Coach technology and the same soleplate. It is in the upper material where they are differentiated. Rather than using the Hybrid S-L seen in the regular LZ, Adidas employ a thinner Sprint-Skin on the back end of the LZ SL. This boot weighed in at 7.3oz.

In May 2013, Adidas officially released the updated version of the Predator LZ, named the Predator LZ II, and it was debuted by several players in Europe, including Napoli's Pepe Reina; Chelsea's Fernando Torres, Oscar and Petr Čech; Arsenal's Aaron Ramsey, Mesut Özil and Per Mertesacker; Real Madrid's Ángel Di María and Xabi Alonso; and Chelsea's Juan Mata. First released in a Ray Green colorway, the next-generation Predator boasts new raised rubber lethal zones which add increased friction between your foot and the ball for ultimate control, touch, passing and shooting. Other features include the Hybrid-Touch upper which is designed for optimal performance in all weather conditions and Traxion 2.0 stud configuration and Sprint-Frame soleplate.

=== Predator 18 ===
After being discontinued and replaced by the Adidas Ace, the Predator made a grand return in November 2017. The Predator 18 marked the first time a laceless upper was used in the collection, initially launching in black as part of the "Sky-stalker" boot pack. This design ushered in a new era of Predator, making use of modern Primeknit materials which includes a layer of CONTROLSKIN, ideal for controlling the ball and dictating the play in midfield. The new generation was worn by Paul Pogba, Mesut Özil, Dele Alli and Ivan Rakitić.

== See also ==
- Adidas adiPure range of football boots.
