= 2018 FIFA Club World Cup final =

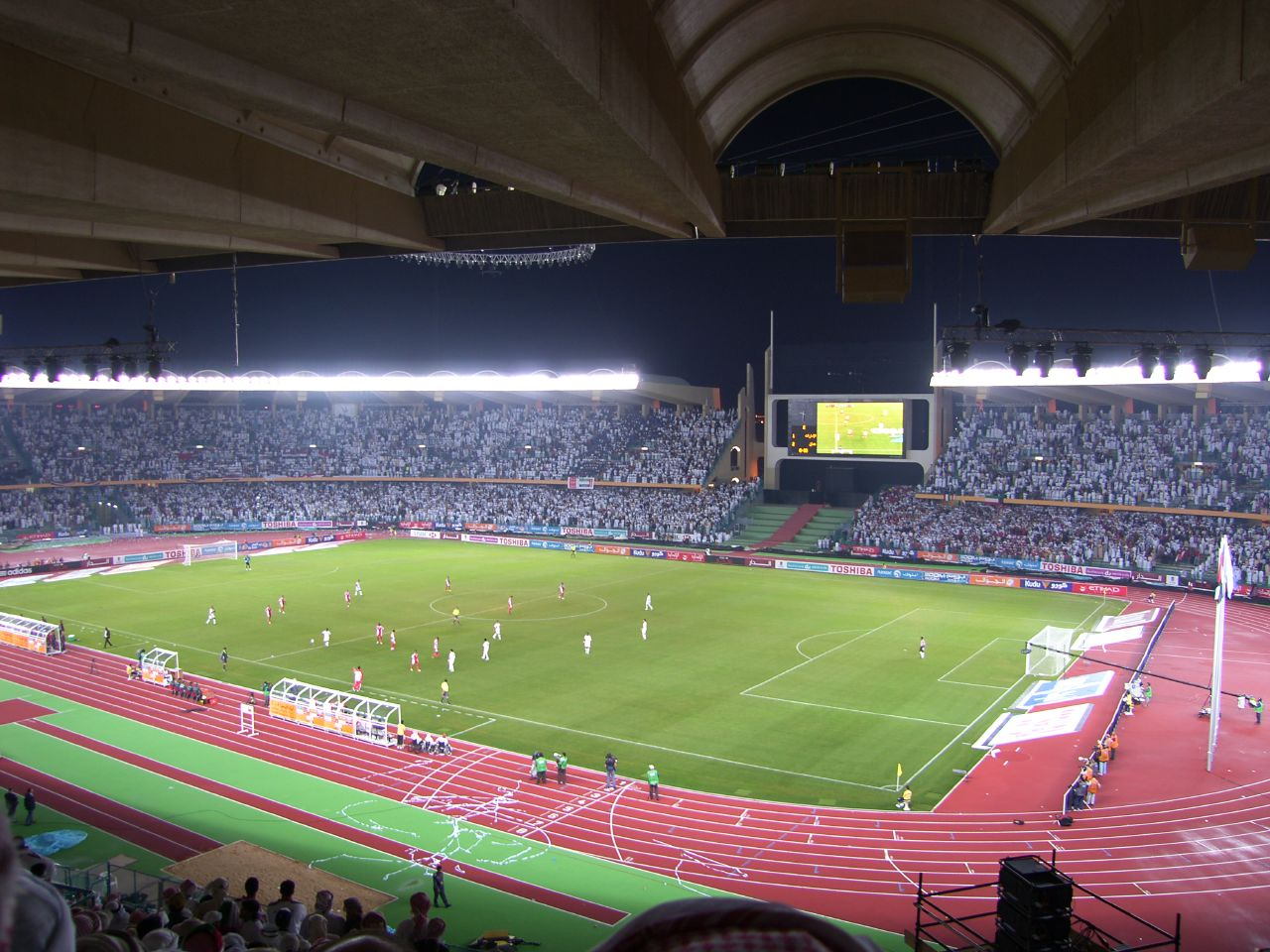
- The Zayed Sports City Stadium in Abu Dhabi hosted the final.
- Event: 2018 FIFA Club World Cup
Real Madrid	Al Ain
(Spain)	(United Arab Emirates)
4	1
- Date: 22 December 2018
- Venue: Zayed Sports City Stadium, Abu Dhabi
- Man of the Match: Marcos Llorente (Real Madrid)
- Referee: Jair Marrufo (United States)
- Attendance: 40,696
- Weather: Clear night 22 °C (72 °F); 65% humidity

The 2018 FIFA Club World Cup final was the final match of the 2018 FIFA Club World Cup, an international club association football tournament hosted by the United Arab Emirates. It was the 15th final of the FIFA Club World Cup, a FIFA-organised tournament between the winners of the six continental confederations, as well as the host nation's league champions.

The final was contested between Spanish club and defending champions Real Madrid (who won the last two editions of the competition), representing UEFA as the reigning champions of the UEFA Champions League, and Emirati club Al Ain, representing the host nation as the reigning champions of the UAE Pro-League. The match was played at the Zayed Sports City Stadium in Abu Dhabi on 22 December 2018.

Real Madrid won the final 4–1 for their third consecutive and fourth overall FIFA Club World Cup title, breaking the tie with Barcelona to become the outright record winners of the competition.

== Teams ==
In the following table, finals until 2005 were in the FIFA Club World Championship era, since 2006 were in the FIFA Club World Cup era.

Team	Confederation	Qualification for tournament	Previous club world championship finals
(Spain) Real Madrid	UEFA	Winners of the 2017–18 UEFA Champions League	IC: 5 (1960, 1966, 1998, 2000, 2002); FCWC: 3 (2014, 2016, 2017)
(United Arab Emirates) Al Ain	AFC (host)	Winners of the 2017–18 UAE Pro-League	None

== Venue ==
Zayed Sports City Stadium in Abu Dhabi was announced as the venue for the final in May 2018, reprising its role as the final venue in 2009, 2010, and 2017. It is the largest stadium in the United Arab Emirates and is primarily used by the Emirati national football team. Zayed Sports City Stadium hosted the 1996 Asian Cup final and is planned to host several matches in the 2019 AFC Asian Cup. It is also featured on the 200 Dirham banknote. The 43,000-seat stadium opened in 1980 and also hosted matches in the 2003 FIFA World Youth Championship and the 2013 FIFA U-17 World Cup.

== Background ==
Real Madrid qualified for the Club World Cup as winners of the 2017–18 UEFA Champions League by defeating Liverpool in the final. The club won three of the four previous editions of the Club World Cup: in 2014, 2016 and 2017. This was their fifth participation and third consecutive appearance in the tournament, both a record for European teams. The match was their fourth overall final (after 2014, 2016 and 2017), tying the record with Barcelona. The match also was their third consecutive final, extending their record set in the previous edition. The match was the 14th consecutive and overall final featuring a European team (with only the first final in 2000 including no team from Europe), and the 8th overall and 5th consecutive final featuring a Spanish team, all extending the competition records. If Real Madrid were to win, they would become the outright record winners of the Club World Cup with four titles, breaking their tie with Barcelona for the record. A win would also extended the records for most consecutive titles for a team (3), most titles for a confederation (11 for UEFA), most consecutive titles for a confederation (6 for UEFA, breaking the tie set by European teams between 2007 and 2011), most titles for a nation (7 for Spain), and most consecutive titles for a nation (5 for Spain).

Al Ain qualified for their first Club World Cup as winners of the 2017–18 season of the UAE Pro-League, the top-level league in the United Arab Emirates. Al Ain was the first Emirati team to reach the Club World Cup final, as well as the second Asian team (after Kashima Antlers in 2016). The final was also the third final to feature the host representative (after Corinthians in 2000, Raja Casablanca in 2013 and Kashima Antlers in 2016). If Al Ain were to win, they would have become the first team outside of Europe and South America to win the Club World Cup, as well as the second host representative to win the tournament (after Corinthians in 2000).

The final was the second between an Asian and European team, after Real Madrid won against Kashima Antlers in the 2016 final. The final was also the third final between the host representative and a European team, both won by the European team, with Bayern Munich winning against Raja Casablanca in 2013, in addition to the aforementioned 2016 final. The match was the fourth final not to feature a South American team after 2010, 2013 and 2016 (all of which the European teams won).

== Route to the final ==
(Spain) Real Madrid		Team	(United Arab Emirates) Al Ain	
Opponent	Result	2018 FIFA Club World Cup	Opponent	Result
		First round	(New Zealand) Team Wellington	3–3 (a.e.t.) (4–3 p)
		Second round	(Tunisia) Espérance de Tunis	3–0
(Japan) Kashima Antlers	3–1	Semi-finals	(Argentina) River Plate	2–2 (a.e.t.) (5–4 p)

=== Real Madrid ===
As European champions, Real Madrid received a bye to the semi-final round, where they faced Asian champions Kashima Antlers of Japan. Kashima, who had defeated CONCACAF champions Guadalajara, were defeated by Real Madrid in the 2016 final. Madrid defeated the Antlers 3–1 on a hat-trick scored by Gareth Bale over 11 minutes of play. Bale scored in the 44th minute and added two goals in the 53rd and 55th minutes to open the second half; Shoma Doi scored a consolation goal for Kashima in the 78th minute after it was ruled onside by the video assistant referee.

=== Al Ain ===
In the first round on 12 December, Al Ain defeated Team Wellington in a penalty shoot-out following a 3–3 draw at their home stadium, Hazza bin Zayed Stadium. Wellington, a semi-professional club that qualified as the OFC Champions League champion, entered halftime with a 3–1 lead that was cut back by an equalising volley from Marcus Berg. The match remained scoreless after extra time and advanced to a penalty shoot-out, which Al Ain won 4–3 after five rounds after goalkeeper Khalid Eisa made two saves.

Al Ain advanced to face African champions Espérance de Tunis in the second round match, held three days later at Hazza bin Zayed Stadium. The team defeated Espérance 3–0 in an upset that began with two goals scored in the opening 16 minutes. Al Ain produced a larger upset in the semi-finals, defeating Copa Libertadores champions River Plate in a penalty shoot-out to advance to the Club World Cup final. The match began with two early goals for River Plate scored by Rafael Santos Borré following an opening strike from Berg; after an equalising goal was disallowed by the video assistant referee, Caio Lucas Fernandes scored for Al Ain in the 51st minute to draw the teams level at 2–2. After a scoreless extra time, aided by goalkeeper Essa's saves, Al Ain defeated River Plate 5–4 in a penalty shoot-out, its second of the competition, with Essa making one save on River's Enzo Pérez. The semi-final upset of River was called the "greatest achievement" in Emirati football history by Al Ain manager Zoran Mamić.

== Match ==
=== Summary ===
Real Madrid had 70 percent of possession in the first half, taking advantage of Al Ain's defensive lapses to produce 11 shots. After a saved chance from Al Ain's Hussein El Shahat, Luka Modrić opened scoring for Madrid in the 14th minute with a left-footed shot. Caio attempted to equalize a minute later, but was found to be offside. The half ended with a 1–0 lead for Madrid, with several later shots saved by Al Ain goalkeeper Khalid Eisa.

Madrid opened the second half with another series of attacks while retaining possession of the ball, finding its second goal in the 60th minute on a long-distance strike by Marcos Llorente. The pace of the match slowed as Al Ain looked to find a consolation goal, with Caio taking advantage of a defensive mistake by Sergio Ramos but unable to score against goalkeeper Thibaut Courtois. Ramos responded by scoring in the 79th minute, a header on a corner kick taken by Modrić after a counter-attack, to give Real Madrid a three-goal lead. Six minutes later, a free kick taken by Caio found left-back Tsukasa Shiotani, who scored Al Ain's only goal of the match. In stoppage time, an own goal was scored by Al Ain's Yahia Nader on a cross by Madrid substitute Vinícius Júnior; it was Madrid's final goal to extend their lead to 4–1.

=== Details ===
22 December 2018
20:30 GST

Real Madrid (Spain)	4–1	(United Arab Emirates) Al Ain
Modrić 14'; Llorente 60'; Ramos 79'; Nader 90+1' (o.g.)	Report	Shiotani 86'

Zayed Sports City Stadium, Abu Dhabi
Attendance: 40,696
Referee: Jair Marrufo (United States)

Real Madrid	Al Ain

GK	25	(Belgium) Thibaut Courtois
RB	2	(Spain) Dani Carvajal
CB	5	(France) Raphaël Varane
CB	4	(Spain) Sergio Ramos (c)	(yellow card) 45'
LB	12	(Brazil) Marcelo
CM	10	(Croatia) Luka Modrić
CM	18	(Spain) Marcos Llorente		(substituted off) 82'
CM	8	(Germany) Toni Kroos		(substituted off) 70'
RF	17	(Spain) Lucas Vázquez		(substituted off) 84'
CF	9	(France) Karim Benzema
LF	11	(Wales) Gareth Bale
Substitutes:
GK	1	(Costa Rica) Keylor Navas
GK	13	(Spain) Kiko Casilla
DF	3	(Spain) Jesús Vallejo
DF	6	(Spain) Nacho
DF	19	(Spain) Álvaro Odriozola
DF	23	(Spain) Sergio Reguilón
MF	14	(Brazil) Casemiro		(substituted on) 82'
MF	15	(Uruguay) Federico Valverde
MF	20	(Spain) Marco Asensio
MF	22	(Spain) Isco
MF	24	(Spain) Dani Ceballos		(substituted on) 70'
FW	28	(Brazil) Vinícius Júnior		(substituted on) 84'
Manager:
(Argentina) Santiago Solari

GK	17	(United Arab Emirates) Khalid Eisa
RB	23	(United Arab Emirates) Mohamed Ahmed	(substituted off) 64'
CB	5	(United Arab Emirates) Ismail Ahmed (c)
CB	14	(United Arab Emirates) Mohammed Fayez
LB	33	(Japan) Tsukasa Shiotani
CM	43	(United Arab Emirates) Rayan Yaslam
CM	16	(United Arab Emirates) Mohamed Abdulrahman	(substituted off) 67'
CM	3	(Mali) Tongo Doumbia
RW	74	(Egypt) Hussein El Shahat
LW	7	(Brazil) Caio
CF	9	(Sweden) Marcus Berg	(substituted off) 75'
Substitutes:
GK	1	(United Arab Emirates) Mohammed Busanda
GK	12	(United Arab Emirates) Hamad Al-Mansouri
DF	19	(United Arab Emirates) Mohanad Salem
DF	44	(United Arab Emirates) Saeed Jumaa
MF	6	(United Arab Emirates) Amer Abdulrahman	(substituted on) 67'
MF	11	(United Arab Emirates) Bandar Al-Ahbabi	(substituted on) 64'
MF	13	(United Arab Emirates) Ahmed Barman
MF	18	(United Arab Emirates) Ibrahim Diaky
MF	28	(United Arab Emirates) Sulaiman Nasser
MF	30	(United Arab Emirates) Mohammed Khalfan
MF	88	(Egypt) Yahia Nader	(substituted on) 75'
FW	99	(United Arab Emirates) Jamal Ibrahim
Manager:
(Croatia) Zoran Mamić

Man of the Match:
Marcos Llorente (Real Madrid)

Assistant referees:
Frank Anderson (United States)
Corey Rockwell (United States)
Fourth official:
Wilton Sampaio (Brazil)
Reserve assistant referee:
Zakhele Siwela (South Africa)
Video assistant referees:
Danny Makkelie (Netherlands)
Assistant video assistant referee:
Mark Geiger (United States)
Bruno Boschilia (Brazil)
Mauro Vigliano (Argentina)

Match rules

- 90 minutes
- 30 minutes of extra time if necessary
- Penalty shoot-out if scores still level
- Twelve named substitutes
- Maximum of three substitutions, with a fourth allowed in extra time

=== Statistics ===
First half
Statistic	Real Madrid	Al Ain
Goals scored	1	0
Total shots	11	2
Shots on target	3	0
Saves	0	2
Ball possession	70%	30%
Corner kicks	6	2
Fouls committed	6	3
Offsides	3	1
Yellow cards	1	0
Red cards	0	0

Second half
Statistic	Real Madrid	Al Ain
Goals scored	3	1
Total shots	10	6
Shots on target	5	2
Saves	1	2
Ball possession	56%	44%
Corner kicks	2	2
Fouls committed	6	7
Offsides	1	1
Yellow cards	0	0
Red cards	0	0

Overall
Statistic	Real Madrid	Al Ain
Goals scored	4	1
Total shots	21	8
Shots on target	8	2
Saves	1	4
Ball possession	63%	37%
Corner kicks	8	4
Fouls committed	12	10
Offsides	4	2
Yellow cards	1	0
Red cards	0	0

== Post-match ==
With their win, Real Madrid became the outright record winners of the Club World Cup with four titles. They also extended the record for most consecutive titles with their third in a row. It was the only trophy won by manager Santiago Solari during his reign at Real Madrid, who was hired in October 2018 and fired in March 2019; Solari complimented Al Ain on their run to the final, calling it a "remarkable achievement".

Marcos Llorente, who scored one goal in the match, won the man of the match award for the final. Gareth Bale of Real Madrid won the Golden Ball award as the best player of the tournament, finishing as joint-top scorer with three goals (tied with Rafael Santos Borré of River Plate). Caio of Al Ain won the Silver Ball award behind Bale. Real Madrid also won the FIFA Fair Play Award with the best disciplinary record at the tournament.

== See also ==
- Real Madrid CF in international football competitions
