= 2022 FIFA Club World Cup final =

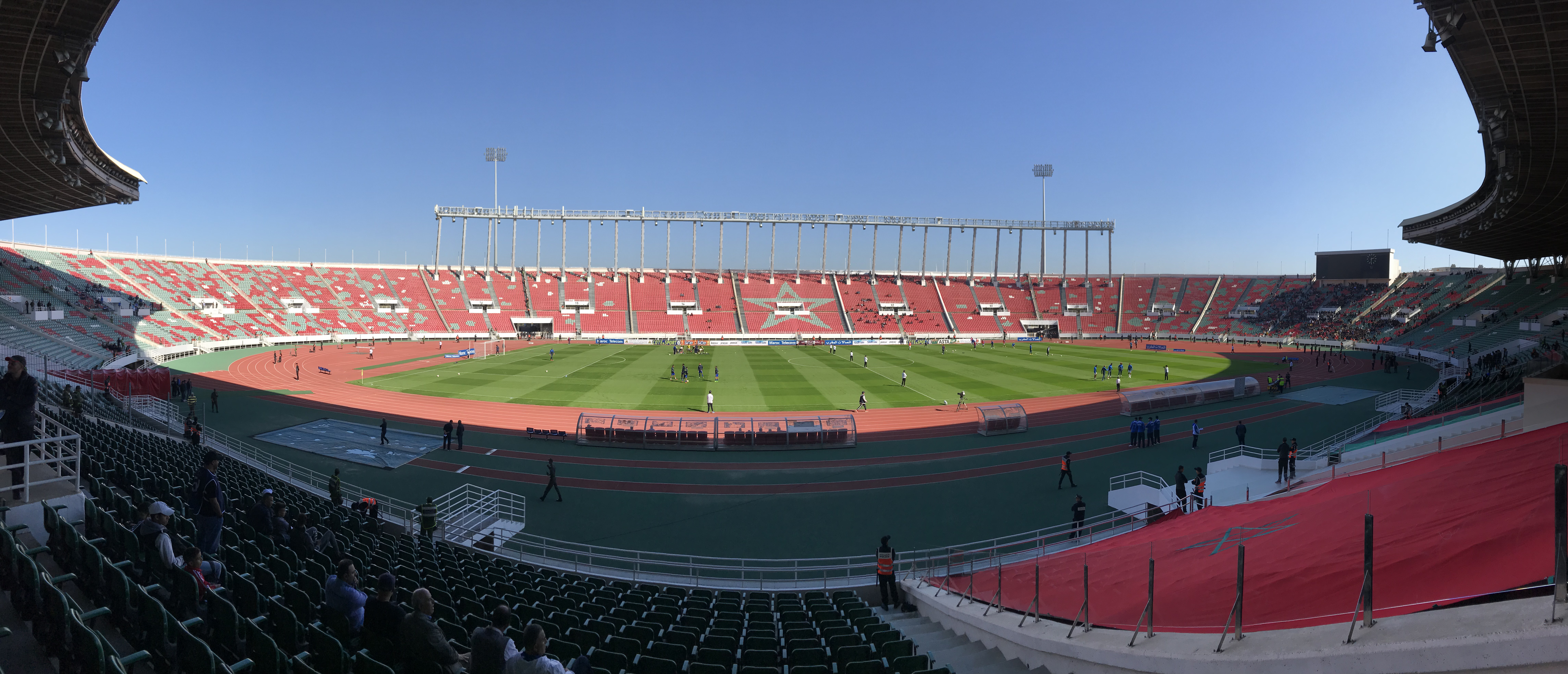
- The Prince Moulay Abdellah Stadium in Rabat hosted the final.
- Event: 2022 FIFA Club World Cup
Real Madrid	Al-Hilal
(Spain)	(Saudi Arabia)
5	3
- Date: 11 February 2023
- Venue: Prince Moulay Abdellah Stadium, Rabat
- Man of the Match: Vinícius Júnior (Real Madrid)
- Referee: Anthony Taylor (England)
- Attendance: 44,439
- Weather: Clear night 16 °C (61 °F); 52% humidity

The 2022 FIFA Club World Cup final was the final match of the 2022 FIFA Club World Cup, an international club football tournament hosted by Morocco. It was the 19th final of the FIFA Club World Cup, a FIFA-organised tournament between the club champions from each of the six continental confederations, as well as the host nation's league champions.

The match was played at the Prince Moulay Abdellah Stadium in Rabat on 11 February 2023. It was contested by Spanish club Real Madrid, representing UEFA as the reigning champions of the UEFA Champions League, and Saudi Arabian club Al-Hilal, representing the AFC. (Note: Due to scheduling issues, it was confirmed that the final of the 2022 AFC Champions League, originally scheduled for October 2022, would not be completed until May 2023. As the 2022 FIFA Club World Cup would already be held by that time, the AFC confirmed on 23 December 2022 that Al-Hilal would be their representative at the 2022 FIFA Club World Cup as the reigning champions from the 2021 AFC Champions League.)

Real Madrid won the match 5–3 for their fifth FIFA Club World Cup title and eighth club world championship. With eight goals, the match was the highest scoring final in Club World Cup history.

== Teams ==
In the following table, the finals until 2005 were in the FIFA Club World Championship era, and since 2006 in the FIFA Club World Cup era.

Team	Confederation	Qualification for tournament	Previous club world championship finals (bold indicates winners)
(Spain) Real Madrid	UEFA	Winners of the 2021–22 UEFA Champions League	IC: 5 (**1960**, 1966, **1998**, 2000, **2002**); FCWC: 4 (**2014**, **2016**, **2017**, **2018**)
(Saudi Arabia) Al-Hilal	AFC	Nominated by AFC	None

Al-Hilal became the third Asian club to reach the Club World Cup final in the 19th edition of the tournament. They are also the first AFC nominee to do so, as the Asian appearances in the 2016 and 2018 finals were both the club of the host association.

Note: On 27 October 2017, FIFA officially recognised all the champions of the Intercontinental Cup as club world champions, in equal status to the FIFA Club World Cup.

- IC: Intercontinental Cup (1960–2004)
- FCWC: FIFA Club World Cup finals (2000, 2005–present)

== Route to the final ==
(Spain) Real Madrid		Team	(Saudi Arabia) Al-Hilal	
Opponent	Result	2022 FIFA Club World Cup	Opponent	Result
Bye		Second round	(Morocco) Wydad Casablanca	1–1 (a.e.t.) (5–3 p)
(Egypt) Al Ahly	4–1	Semi-finals	(Brazil) Flamengo	3–2

== Match ==
=== Details ===
11 February 2023
20:00

Real Madrid (Spain)	5–3	(Saudi Arabia) Al-Hilal
Vinícius 13', 69'; Valverde 18', 58'; Benzema 54'	Report	Marega 26'; Vietto 63', 79'

Prince Moulay Abdellah Stadium, Rabat
Attendance: 44,439
Referee: Anthony Taylor (England)

Real Madrid	Al Hilal

GK	13	(Ukraine) Andriy Lunin
RB	2	(Spain) Dani Carvajal	(substituted off) 79'
CB	22	(Germany) Antonio Rüdiger
CB	4	(Austria) David Alaba
LB	12	(France) Eduardo Camavinga
DM	18	(France) Aurélien Tchouaméni	(substituted off) 62'
CM	10	(Croatia) Luka Modrić	(substituted off) 74'
CM	8	(Germany) Toni Kroos	(substituted off) 74'
RF	15	(Uruguay) Federico Valverde
CF	9	(France) Karim Benzema (c)	(substituted off) 62'
LF	20	(Brazil) Vinícius Júnior
Substitutes:
GK	26	(Spain) Luis López
GK	30	(Spain) Lucas Cañizares
DF	3	(Brazil) Éder Militão
DF	5	(Spain) Jesús Vallejo	(substituted on) 79'
DF	6	(Spain) Nacho	(substituted on) 74'
DF	16	(Spain) Álvaro Odriozola
MF	19	(Spain) Dani Ceballos	(substituted on) 62'
MF	31	(Spain) Mario Martín
MF	33	(Spain) Sergio Arribas
FW	11	(Spain) Marco Asensio	(substituted on) 74'
FW	21	(Brazil) Rodrygo	(substituted on) 62'
FW	24	(Dominican Republic) Mariano
Manager:
(Italy) Carlo Ancelotti

GK	1	(Saudi Arabia) Abdullah Al-Mayouf (c)
RB	66	(Saudi Arabia) Saud Abdulhamid
CB	20	(South Korea) Jang Hyun-soo
CB	5	(Saudi Arabia) Ali Al-Bulaihi
LB	4	(Saudi Arabia) Khalifah Al-Dawsari
CM	28	(Saudi Arabia) Mohamed Kanno
CM	6	(Colombia) Gustavo Cuéllar
RW	19	(Peru) André Carrillo	(substituted off) 74'
AM	10	(Argentina) Luciano Vietto	(substituted off) 86'
LW	29	(Saudi Arabia) Salem Al-Dawsari	(substituted off) 74'
CF	17	(Mali) Moussa Marega	(substituted off) 86'
Substitutes:
GK	21	(Saudi Arabia) Mohammed Al-Owais
GK	31	(Saudi Arabia) Habib Al-Wotayan
DF	42	(Saudi Arabia) Muath Faqihi
DF	67	(Saudi Arabia) Mohammed Al-Khaibari
DF	70	(Saudi Arabia) Mohammed Jahfali
MF	8	(Saudi Arabia) Abdullah Otayf
MF	16	(Saudi Arabia) Nasser Al-Dawsari	(substituted on) 74'
MF	43	(Saudi Arabia) Musab Al-Juwayr
MF	96	(Brazil) Michael	(substituted on) 74'
FW	9	(Nigeria) Odion Ighalo	(substituted on) 86'
FW	11	(Saudi Arabia) Saleh Al-Shehri
FW	14	(Saudi Arabia) Abdullah Al-Hamdan	(substituted on) 86'
Manager:
(Argentina) Ramón Díaz

Man of the Match:
Vinícius Júnior (Real Madrid)

Assistant referees:
Gary Beswick (England)
Adam Nunn (England)
Fourth official:
Ma Ning (China)
Reserve assistant referee:
Zhou Fei (China)
Video assistant referee:
Massimiliano Irrati (Italy)
Assistant video assistant referees:
Fu Ming (China)
Kathryn Nesbitt (United States)
Rédouane Jiyed (Morocco)

Match rules

- 90 minutes.
- 30 minutes of extra time if necessary.
- Penalty shoot-out if scores still level.
- Maximum of twelve named substitutes.
- Maximum of five substitutions, with a sixth allowed in extra time. (Note: Each team was given only three opportunities to make substitutions, with a fourth opportunity in extra time, excluding substitutions made at half-time, before the start of extra time and at half-time in extra time.)

=== Statistics ===
First half
Statistic	Real Madrid	Al Hilal
Goals scored	2	1
Total shots	6	4
Shots on target	4	1
Saves	0	2
Ball possession	64%	36%
Corner kicks	3	0
Fouls committed	—	—
Offsides	1	1
Yellow cards	0	0
Red cards	0	0

Second half
Statistic	Real Madrid	Al Hilal
Goals scored	3	2
Total shots	11	5
Shots on target	7	2
Saves	0	4
Ball possession	69%	31%
Corner kicks	3	0
Fouls committed	—	—
Offsides	0	0
Yellow cards	0	0
Red cards	0	0

Overall
Statistic	Real Madrid	Al Hilal
Goals scored	5	3
Total shots	17	9
Shots on target	11	3
Saves	0	6
Ball possession	66%	34%
Corner kicks	6	0
Fouls committed	10	8
Offsides	1	1
Yellow cards	0	0
Red cards	0	0
