= Real Madrid CF in international football =

Spanish club in international football

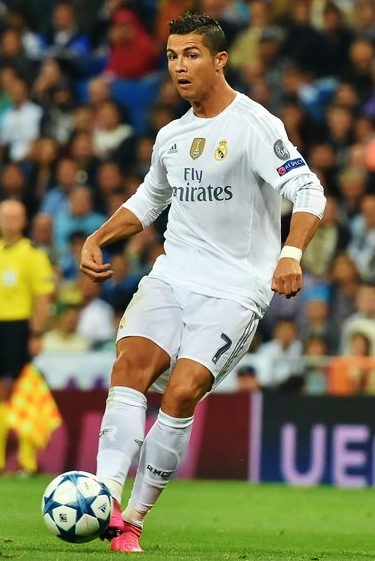
- Cristiano Ronaldo is the Real Madrid player with the highest goal tally in international competitions, with 113 scored.
- Club: Real Madrid
- Seasons played: 70
- Most appearances: Iker Casillas (162)
- Top scorer: Cristiano Ronaldo (113)
- First entry: 1955–56 European Cup
- Latest entry: 2026–27 UEFA Champions League

Titles
- Champions League: 15: 1956; 1957; 1958; 1959; 1960; 1966; 1998; 2000; 2002; 2014; 2016; 2017; 2018; 2022; 2024
- Europa League: 2: 1985; 1986
- Super Cup: 6: 2002; 2014; 2016; 2017; 2022; 2024
- Intercontinental Cup: 4: 1960; 1998; 2002; 2024
- FIFA Club World Cup: 5: 2014; 2016; 2017; 2018; 2022

Real Madrid Club de Fútbol is a professional football club based in Madrid, Spain. The club first participated in a European competition in 1955. The first international cup they took part in was the Latin Cup in which they participated as champions of Spain. The competition lasted from 1949 to 1957 and Real Madrid won both tournaments which they entered, the same number as Barcelona and Milan. Since becoming the first Spanish club to enter the European Cup in 1955, Real has competed in every UEFA-organized competition, except the Intertoto Cup and Conference League. They have missed out on European football entirely only twice in their history, in the 1977–78 and 1996–97 seasons.

Real Madrid has had the most success in the European Cup, winning the trophy for a record fifteen times. Real was the winner of the inaugural edition of the tournament and remains the only club to win the trophy five times in a row (the first five editions). It also holds the distinction of being the only club to defend the title in the Champions League era, as well as to win it three times in a row. The club has also won the UEFA Cup twice, in 1985 and 1986, the Super Cup six times, in 2002, 2014, 2016, 2017, 2022 and 2024, the Intercontinental Cup three times, in 1960, 1998, and 2002, the FIFA Club World Cup five times, in 2014, 2016, 2017, 2018 and 2022, and the FIFA Intercontinental Cup once, in 2024. Real Madrid, with 32 continental and worldwide trophies, is the most successful team in international club football, five titles ahead of Al Ahly.

== Latin Cup ==
In 1949, the football federations of Spain, Italy, France and Portugal launched their own club competition. European clubs could not afford hefty travel costs so the Copa Latina was staged at the end of every season in a single host country. The competition featured two semi-finals, a third place play-off and a final. As La Liga champions in 1955, Real Madrid represented Spain in the 1955 edition of the competition. They defeated Belenenses 2–0 in their semi-final at the Parc des Princes in Paris, before beating Reims 2–0 in the final at the same venue. Real Madrid won the 1957 competition at the Santiago Bernabéu, defeating Milan in the semi-finals and then Benfica 1–0 in the final. After the introduction of the European Cup, the Latin Cup was discontinued and nowadays it is not recognized by UEFA.

Year	Round	Opposing team	Score
1955	Semi-final	(Portugal) Belenenses	2–0 (N)
1955	Final	(France) Reims	2–0 (N)
1957	Semi-final	(Italy) Milan	5–1 (H)
1957	Final	(Portugal) Benfica	1–0 (H)

== European Cup / UEFA Champions League ==
The European Cup was inaugurated in 1955 as a tournament for the champions of European national leagues, with Real Madrid winning the first five editions. However, after winning the trophy five times in a row in the 1950s, and again in 1966, the club experienced mixed fortunes until the end of the 1990s. Since then, Real Madrid has won the competition nine times (1998, 2000, 2002, 2014, 2016, 2017, 2018, 2022, and 2024), and established itself as one of the premier sides in European football. Since the 1997–98 campaign, Real Madrid have qualified for 30 consecutive seasons of the competition.

Season	Round	Opposition	Score
1955–56	First round	(Switzerland) Servette	2–0 (A), 5–0 (H)
1955–56	Quarter-final	(Socialist Federal Republic of Yugoslavia) Partizan	4–0 (H), 0–3 (A)
1955–56	Semi-final	(Italy) Milan	4–2 (H), 1–2 (A)
1955–56	Final	(France) Reims	4–3 (N)
1956–57	First round	(Austria) Rapid Wien	4–2 (H), 1–3 (A), 2–0 (H)
1956–57	Quarter-final	(France) Nice	3–0 (H), 3–2 (A)
1956–57	Semi-final	(England) Manchester United	3–1 (H), 2–2 (A)
1956–57	Final	(Italy) Fiorentina	2–0 (H)
1957–58	First round	(Belgium) Antwerp	2–1 (A), 6–0 (H)
1957–58	Quarter-final	(Spain) Sevilla	8–0 (H), 2–2 (A)
1957–58	Semi-final	(Hungary) Vasas	4–0 (H), 0–2 (A)
1957–58	Final	(Italy) Milan	3–2 (N) (a.e.t.)
1958–59	First round	(Turkey) Beşiktaş	2–0 (H), 1–1 (A)
1958–59	Quarter-final	(Austria) Wiener Sportclub	0–0 (A), 7–1 (H)
1958–59	Semi-final	(Spain) Atlético Madrid	2–1 (H), 0–1 (A), 2–1 (N)
1958–59	Final	(France) Reims	2–0 (N)
1959–60	First round	(Luxembourg) Jeunesse Esch	7–0 (H), 5–2 (A)
1959–60	Quarter-final	(France) Nice	2–3 (A), 4–0 (H)
1959–60	Semi-final	(Spain) Barcelona	3–1 (H), 3–1 (A)
1959–60	Final	(West Germany) Eintracht Frankfurt	7–3 (N)
1960–61	First round	(Spain) Barcelona	2–2 (H), 1–2 (A)
1961–62	Preliminary round	(Hungary) Vasas	2–0 (A), 3–1 (H)
1961–62	First round	(Denmark) Boldklubben 1913	3–0 (A), 9–0 (H)
1961–62	Quarter-final	(Italy) Juventus	1–0 (A), 0–1 (H), 3–1 (N)
1961–62	Semi-final	(Belgium) Standard Liège	4–0 (H), 2–0 (A)
1961–62	Final	(Portugal) Benfica	3–5 (N)
1962–63	Preliminary round	(Belgium) Anderlecht	3–3 (H), 0–1 (A)
1963–64	Preliminary round	(Scotland) Rangers	1–0 (A), 6–0 (H)
1963–64	First round	(Romania) Dinamo București	3–1 (A), 5–3 (H)
1963–64	Quarter-final	(Italy) Milan	4–1 (H), 0–2 (A)
1963–64	Semi-final	(Switzerland) Zürich	2–1 (A), 6–0 (H)
1963–64	Final	(Italy) Internazionale	1–3 (N)
1964–65	Preliminary round	(Denmark) Boldklubben 1909	5–2 (A), 4–0 (H)
1964–65	First round	(Czechoslovakia) Dukla Prague	4–0 (H), 2–2 (A)
1964–65	Quarter-final	(Portugal) Benfica	1–5 (A), 2–1 (H)
1965–66	Preliminary round	(Netherlands) Feyenoord	1–2 (A), 5–0 (H)
1965–66	First round	(Scotland) Kilmarnock	2–2 (A), 5–1 (H)
1965–66	Quarter-final	(Belgium) Anderlecht	0–1 (A), 4–2 (H)
1965–66	Semi-final	(Italy) Internazionale	1–0 (H), 1–1 (A)
1965–66	Final	(Socialist Federal Republic of Yugoslavia) Partizan	2–1 (N)
1966–67	Second round	(West Germany) 1860 Munich	0–1 (A), 3–1 (H)
1966–67	Quarter-final	(Italy) Internazionale	0–1 (A), 0–2 (H)
1967–68	First round	(Netherlands) Ajax	1–1 (A), 2–1 (H) (a.e.t.)
1967–68	Second round	(Denmark) Hvidovre	2–2 (A), 4–1 (H)
1967–68	Quarter-final	(Czechoslovakia) Sparta Prague	3–0 (H), 1–2 (A)
1967–68	Semi-final	(England) Manchester United	0–1 (A), 3–3 (H)
1968–69	First round	(Cyprus) AEL	6–0 (H), 6–0 (A)
1968–69	Second round	(Austria) Rapid Wien	0–1 (A), 2–1 (H) (a)
1969–70	First round	(Cyprus) Olympiakos Nicosia	8–0 (A), 6–1 (H)
1969–70	Second round	(Belgium) Standard Liège	0–1 (A), 2–3 (H)
1972–73	First round	(Iceland) Keflavík	3–0 (H), 1–0 (A)
1972–73	Second round	(Romania) Argeş Piteşti	1–2 (A), 3–1 (H)
1972–73	Quarter-final	(Soviet Union) Dynamo Kyiv	0–0 (A), 3–0 (H)
1972–73	Semi-final	(Netherlands) Ajax	1–2 (A), 0–1 (H)
1975–76	First round	(Romania) Dinamo București	4–1 (H), 0–1 (A)
1975–76	Second round	(England) Derby County	1–4 (A), 5–1 (H) (a.e.t.)
1975–76	Quarter-final	(West Germany) Borussia Mönchengladbach	2–2 (A), 1–1 (H) (a)
1975–76	Semi-final	(West Germany) Bayern Munich	1–1 (H), 0–2 (A)
1976–77	First round	(Poland) Stal Mielec	2–1 (A), 1–0 (H)
1976–77	Second round	(Belgium) Club Brugge	0–0 (H), 0–2 (A)
1978–79	First round	(Luxembourg) Progrès Niedercorn	5–0 (H), 7–0 (A)
1978–79	Second round	(Switzerland) Grasshopper	3–1 (H), 0–2 (A) (a)
1979–80	First round	(Bulgaria) Levski Sofia	1–0 (A), 2–0 (H)
1979–80	Second round	(Portugal) Porto	1–2 (A), 1–0 (H) (a)
1979–80	Quarter-final	(Scotland) Celtic	0–2 (A), 3–0 (H)
1979–80	Semi-final	(West Germany) Hamburger SV	2–0 (H), 1–5 (A)
1980–81	First round	(Republic of Ireland) Limerick	2–1 (A), 5–1 (H)
1980–81	Second round	(Hungary) Budapest Honvéd	1–0 (H), 2–0 (A)
1980–81	Quarter-final	(Soviet Union) Spartak Moscow	0–0 (A), 2–0 (H)
1980–81	Semi-final	(Italy) Internazionale	2–0 (H), 0–1 (A)
1980–81	Final	(England) Liverpool	0–1 (N)
1986–87	First round	(Switzerland) Young Boys	0–1 (A), 5–0 (H)
1986–87	Second round	(Italy) Juventus	1–0 (H), 0–1 (A), (3–1 p)
1986–87	Quarter-final	(Socialist Federal Republic of Yugoslavia) Red Star Belgrade	2–4 (A), 2–0 (H) (a)
1986–87	Semi-final	(West Germany) Bayern Munich	1–4 (A), 1–0 (H)
1987–88	First round	(Italy) Napoli	2–0 (H), 1–1 (A)
1987–88	Second round	(Portugal) Porto	2–1 (H), 2–1 (A)
1987–88	Quarter-final	(West Germany) Bayern Munich	2–3 (A), 2–0 (H)
1987–88	Semi-final	(Netherlands) PSV Eindhoven	1–1 (H), 0–0 (A) (a)
1988–89	First round	(Norway) Moss	3–0 (H), 1–0 (A)
1988–89	Second round	(Poland) Górnik Zabrze	1–0 (A), 3–2 (H)
1988–89	Quarter-final	(Netherlands) PSV Eindhoven	1–1 (A), 2–1 (H) (a.e.t.)
1988–89	Semi-final	(Italy) Milan	1–1 (H), 0–5 (A)
1989–90	First round	Spora Luxembourg	3–0 (A), 6–0 (H)
1989–90	Second round	(Italy) Milan	0–2 (A), 1–0 (H)
1990–91	First round	(Denmark) Odense BK	4–1 (A), 6–0 (H)
1990–91	Second round	(Austria) Swarovski Tirol	9–1 (H), 2–2 (A)
1990–91	Quarter-final	(Soviet Union) Spartak Moscow	0–0 (A), 1–3 (H)
1995–96	Group D	(Netherlands) Ajax	0–1 (A), 0–2 (H)
1995–96	Group D	(Hungary) Ferencváros	6–1 (H), 1–1 (A)
1995–96	Group D	(Switzerland) Grasshopper	2–0 (H), 2–0 (A)
1995–96	Quarter-final	(Italy) Juventus	1–0 (H), 0–2 (A)
1997–98	Group D	(Norway) Rosenborg	4–1 (H), 0–2 (A)
1997–98	Group D	(Greece) Olympiacos	5–1 (H), 0–0 (A)
1997–98	Group D	(Portugal) Porto	2–0 (A), 4–0 (H)
1997–98	Quarter-final	(Germany) Bayer Leverkusen	1–1 (A), 3–0 (H)
1997–98	Semi-final	(Germany) Borussia Dortmund	2–0 (H), 0–0 (A)
1997–98	Final	(Italy) Juventus	1–0 (N)
1998–99	Group C	(Italy) Internazionale	2–0 (H), 1–3 (A)
1998–99	Group C	(Russia) Spartak Moscow	1–2 (A), 2–1 (H)
1998–99	Group C	(Austria) Sturm Graz	6–1 (H), 5–1 (A)
1998–99	Quarter-final	(Ukraine) Dynamo Kyiv	1–1 (H), 0–2 (A)
1999–2000	First group stage Group E	(Norway) Molde	4–1 (H), 1–0 (A)
1999–2000	First group stage Group E	(Greece) Olympiacos	3–3 (A), 3–0 (H)
1999–2000	First group stage Group E	(Portugal) Porto	3–1 (H), 1–2 (A)
1999–2000	Second group stage Group C	(Germany) Bayern Munich	2–4 (H), 1–4 (A)
1999–2000	Second group stage Group C	(Ukraine) Dynamo Kyiv	2–1 (A), 2–2 (H)
1999–2000	Second group stage Group C	(Norway) Rosenborg	3–1 (H), 1–0 (A)
1999–2000	Quarter-final	(England) Manchester United	0–0 (H), 3–2 (A)
1999–2000	Semi-final	(Germany) Bayern Munich	2–0 (H), 1–2 (A)
1999–2000	Final	(Spain) Valencia	3–0 (N)
2000–01	First group stage Group A	(Russia) Spartak Moscow	1–0 (H), 0–1 (A)
2000–01	First group stage Group A	(Germany) Bayer Leverkusen	3–2 (A), 5–3 (H)
2000–01	First group stage Group A	(Portugal) Sporting CP	2–2 (A), 4–0 (H)
2000–01	Second group stage Group D	(England) Leeds United	2–0 (A), 3–2 (H)
2000–01	Second group stage Group D	(Belgium) Anderlecht	4–1 (H), 0–2 (A)
2000–01	Second group stage Group D	(Italy) Lazio	3–2 (H), 2–2 (A)
2000–01	Quarter-final	(Turkey) Galatasaray	2–3 (A), 3–0 (H)
2000–01	Semi-final	(Germany) Bayern Munich	0–1 (H), 1–2 (A)
2001–02	First group stage Group A	(Italy) Roma	2–1 (A), 1–1 (H)
2001–02	First group stage Group A	(Russia) Lokomotiv Moscow	4–0 (H), 0–2 (A)
2001–02	First group stage Group A	(Belgium) Anderlecht	4–1 (H), 2–0 (A)
2001–02	Second group stage Group C	(Greece) Panathinaikos	3–0 (H), 2–2 (A)
2001–02	Second group stage Group C	(Czech Republic) Sparta Prague	3–2 (A), 3–0 (H)
2001–02	Second group stage Group C	(Portugal) Porto	1–0 (H), 2–1 (A)
2001–02	Quarter-final	(Germany) Bayern Munich	1–2 (A), 2–0 (H)
2001–02	Semi-final	(Spain) Barcelona	2–0 (A), 1–1 (H)
2001–02	Final	(Germany) Bayer Leverkusen	2–1 (N)
2002–03	First group stage Group C	(Italy) Roma	3–0 (A), 0–1 (H)
2002–03	First group stage Group C	(Greece) AEK Athens	3–3 (A), 2–2 (H)
2002–03	First group stage Group C	(Belgium) Genk	6–0 (H), 1–1 (A)
2002–03	Second group stage Group C	(Italy) Milan	0–1 (A), 3–1 (H)
2002–03	Second group stage Group C	(Germany) Borussia Dortmund	2–1 (H), 1–1 (A)
2002–03	Second group stage Group C	(Russia) Lokomotiv Moscow	2–2 (H), 1–0 (A)
2002–03	Quarter-final	(England) Manchester United	3–1 (H), 3–4 (A)
2002–03	Semi-final	(Italy) Juventus	2–1 (H), 1–3 (A)
2003–04	Group F	(Portugal) Porto	3–1 (A), 1–1 (H)
2003–04	Group F	(France) Marseille	4–2 (H), 2–1 (A)
2003–04	Group F	(Serbia and Montenegro) Partizan	1–0 (H), 0–0 (A)
2003–04	Round of 16	(Germany) Bayern Munich	1–1 (A), 1–0 (H)
2003–04	Quarter-final	(France) Monaco	4–2 (H), 1–3 (A) (a)
2004–05	Third qualifying round	(Poland) Wisła Kraków	2–0 (A), 3–1 (H)
2004–05	Group B	(Germany) Bayer Leverkusen	0–3 (A), 1–1 (H)
2004–05	Group B	(Ukraine) Dynamo Kyiv	1–0 (H), 2–2 (A)
2004–05	Group B	(Italy) Roma	4–2 (H), 3–0 (A)
2004–05	Round of 16	(Italy) Juventus	1–0 (H), 0–2 (A) (a.e.t.)
2005–06	Group F	(France) Lyon	0–3 (A), 1–1 (H)
2005–06	Group F	(Norway) Rosenborg	4–1 (H), 2–0 (A)
2005–06	Group F	(Greece) Olympiacos	2–1 (H), 1–2 (A)
2005–06	Round of 16	(England) Arsenal	0–1 (H), 0–0 (A)
2006–07	Group E	(France) Lyon	0–2 (A), 2–2 (H)
2006–07	Group E	(Romania) Steaua București	4–1 (A), 1–0 (H)
2006–07	Group E	(Ukraine) Dynamo Kyiv	5–1 (H), 2–2 (A)
2006–07	Round of 16	(Germany) Bayern Munich	3–2 (H), 1–2 (A) (a)
2007–08	Group C	(Greece) Olympiacos	4–2 (H), 0–0 (A)
2007–08	Group C	(Germany) Werder Bremen	2–1 (H), 2–3 (A)
2007–08	Group C	(Italy) Lazio	2–2 (A), 3–1 (H)
2007–08	Round of 16	(Italy) Roma	1–2 (A), 1–2 (H)
2008–09	Group H	(Belarus) BATE Borisov	2–0 (H), 1–0 (A)
2008–09	Group H	(Russia) Zenit Saint Petersburg	2–1 (A), 3–0 (H)
2008–09	Group H	(Italy) Juventus	1–2 (A), 0–2 (H)
2008–09	Round of 16	(England) Liverpool	0–1 (H), 0–4 (A)
2009–10	Group C	(Switzerland) Zürich	5–2 (A), 1–0 (H)
2009–10	Group C	(France) Marseille	3–0 (H), 3–1 (A)
2009–10	Group C	(Italy) Milan	2–3 (H), 1–1 (A)
2009–10	Round of 16	(France) Lyon	0–1 (A), 1–1 (H)
2010–11	Group G	(Italy) Milan	2–0 (H), 2–2 (A)
2010–11	Group G	(Netherlands) Ajax	2–0 (H), 4–0 (A)
2010–11	Group G	(France) Auxerre	1–0 (A), 4–0 (H)
2010–11	Round of 16	(France) Lyon	1–1 (A), 3–0 (H)
2010–11	Quarter-final	(England) Tottenham Hotspur	4–0 (H), 1–0 (A)
2010–11	Semi-final	(Spain) Barcelona	0–2 (H), 1–1 (A)
2011–12	Group D	(Croatia) Dinamo Zagreb	1–0 (A), 6–2 (H)
2011–12	Group D	(Netherlands) Ajax	3–0 (H), 3–0 (A)
2011–12	Group D	(France) Lyon	4–0 (H), 2–0 (A)
2011–12	Round of 16	(Russia) CSKA Moscow	1–1 (A), 4–1 (H)
2011–12	Quarter-final	(Cyprus) APOEL	3–0 (A), 5–2 (H)
2011–12	Semi-final	(Germany) Bayern Munich	1–2 (A), 2–1 (H), (1–3 p)
2012–13	Group D	(England) Manchester City	3–2 (H), 1–1 (A)
2012–13	Group D	(Netherlands) Ajax	4–1 (A), 4–1 (H)
2012–13	Group D	(Germany) Borussia Dortmund	1–2 (A), 2–2 (H)
2012–13	Round of 16	(England) Manchester United	1–1 (H), 2–1 (A)
2012–13	Quarter-final	(Turkey) Galatasaray	3–0 (H), 2–3 (A)
2012–13	Semi-final	(Germany) Borussia Dortmund	1–4 (A), 2–0 (H)
2013–14	Group B	(Turkey) Galatasaray	6–1 (A), 4–1 (H)
2013–14	Group B	(Denmark) Copenhagen	4–0 (H), 2–0 (A)
2013–14	Group B	(Italy) Juventus	2–1 (H), 2–2 (A)
2013–14	Round of 16	(Germany) Schalke 04	6–1 (A), 3–1 (H)
2013–14	Quarter-final	(Germany) Borussia Dortmund	3–0 (H), 0–2 (A)
2013–14	Semi-final	(Germany) Bayern Munich	1–0 (H), 4–0 (A)
2013–14	Final	(Spain) Atlético Madrid	4–1 (N) (a.e.t.)
2014–15	Group B	(Switzerland) Basel	5–1 (H), 1–0 (A)
2014–15	Group B	(Bulgaria) Ludogorets Razgrad	2–1 (A), 4–0 (H)
2014–15	Group B	(England) Liverpool	3–0 (A), 1–0 (H)
2014–15	Round of 16	(Germany) Schalke 04	2–0 (A), 3–4 (H)
2014–15	Quarter-final	(Spain) Atlético Madrid	0–0 (A), 1–0 (H)
2014–15	Semi-final	(Italy) Juventus	1–2 (A), 1–1 (H)
2015–16	Group A	(Ukraine) Shakhtar Donetsk	4–0 (H), 4–3 (A)
2015–16	Group A	(Sweden) Malmö FF	2–0 (A), 8–0 (H)
2015–16	Group A	(France) Paris Saint-Germain	0–0 (A), 1–0 (H)
2015–16	Round of 16	(Italy) Roma	2–0 (A), 2–0 (H)
2015–16	Quarter-final	(Germany) VfL Wolfsburg	0–2 (A), 3–0 (H)
2015–16	Semi-final	(England) Manchester City	0–0 (A), 1–0 (H)
2015–16	Final	(Spain) Atlético Madrid	1–1 (N), (5–3 p)
2016–17	Group F	(Portugal) Sporting CP	2–1 (H), 2–1 (A)
2016–17	Group F	(Germany) Borussia Dortmund	2–2 (A), 2–2 (H)
2016–17	Group F	(Poland) Legia Warsaw	5–1 (H), 3–3 (A)
2016–17	Round of 16	(Italy) Napoli	3–1 (H), 3–1 (A)
2016–17	Quarter-final	(Germany) Bayern Munich	2–1 (A), 4–2 (H) (a.e.t.)
2016–17	Semi-final	(Spain) Atlético Madrid	3–0 (H), 1–2 (A)
2016–17	Final	(Italy) Juventus	4–1 (N)
2017–18	Group H	(Cyprus) APOEL	3–0 (H), 6–0 (A)
2017–18	Group H	(Germany) Borussia Dortmund	3–1 (A), 3–2 (H)
2017–18	Group H	(England) Tottenham Hotspur	1–1 (H), 1–3 (A)
2017–18	Round of 16	(France) Paris Saint-Germain	3–1 (H), 2–1 (A)
2017–18	Quarter-final	(Italy) Juventus	3–0 (A), 1–3 (H)
2017–18	Semi-final	(Germany) Bayern Munich	2–1 (A), 2–2 (H)
2017–18	Final	(England) Liverpool	3–1 (N)
2018–19	Group G	(Italy) Roma	3–0 (H), 2–0 (A)
2018–19	Group G	(Russia) CSKA Moscow	0–1 (A), 0–3 (H)
2018–19	Group G	(Czech Republic) Viktoria Plzeň	2–1 (H), 5–0 (A)
2018–19	Round of 16	(Netherlands) Ajax	2–1 (A), 1–4 (H)
2019–20	Group A	(France) Paris Saint-Germain	0–3 (A), 2–2 (H)
2019–20	Group A	(Belgium) Club Brugge	2–2 (H), 3–1 (A)
2019–20	Group A	(Turkey) Galatasaray	1–0 (A), 6–0 (H)
2019–20	Round of 16	(England) Manchester City	1–2 (H), 1–2 (A)
2020–21	Group B	(Ukraine) Shakhtar Donetsk	2–3 (H), 0–2 (A)
2020–21	Group B	(Germany) Borussia Mönchengladbach	2–2 (A), 2–0 (H)
2020–21	Group B	(Italy) Internazionale	3–2 (H), 2–0 (A)
2020–21	Round of 16	(Italy) Atalanta	1–0 (A), 3–1 (H)
2020–21	Quarter-final	(England) Liverpool	3–1 (H), 0–0 (A)
2020–21	Semi-final	(England) Chelsea	1–1 (H), 0–2 (A)
2021–22	Group D	(Italy) Internazionale	1–0 (A), 2–0 (H)
2021–22	Group D	(Moldova) Sheriff Tiraspol	1–2 (H), 3–0 (A)
2021–22	Group D	(Ukraine) Shakhtar Donetsk	5–0 (A), 2–1 (H)
2021–22	Round of 16	(France) Paris Saint-Germain	0–1 (A), 3–1 (H)
2021–22	Quarter-final	(England) Chelsea	3–1 (A), 2–3 (H) (a.e.t.)
2021–22	Semi-final	(England) Manchester City	3–4 (A), 3–1 (H) (a.e.t.)
2021–22	Final	(England) Liverpool	1–0 (N)
2022–23	Group F	(Scotland) Celtic	3–0 (A), 5–1 (H)
2022–23	Group F	(Germany) RB Leipzig	2–0 (H), 2–3 (A)
2022–23	Group F	(Ukraine) Shakhtar Donetsk	2–1 (H), 1–1 (A)
2022–23	Round of 16	(England) Liverpool	5–2 (A), 1–0 (H)
2022–23	Quarter-final	(England) Chelsea	2–0 (H), 2–0 (A)
2022–23	Semi-final	(England) Manchester City	1–1 (H), 0–4 (A)
2023–24	Group C	(Germany) Union Berlin	1–0 (H), 3–2 (A)
2023–24	Group C	(Italy) Napoli	3–2 (A), 4–2 (H)
2023–24	Group C	(Portugal) Braga	2–1 (A), 3–0 (H)
2023–24	Round of 16	(Germany) RB Leipzig	1–0 (A), 1–1 (H)
2023–24	Quarter-final	(England) Manchester City	3–3 (H), 1–1 (A), (4–3 p)
2023–24	Semi-final	(Germany) Bayern Munich	2–2 (A), 2–1 (H)
2023–24	Final	(Germany) Borussia Dortmund	2–0 (N)
2024–25	League phase	(Germany) VfB Stuttgart	3–1 (H)
2024–25	League phase	(France) Lille	0–1 (A)
2024–25	League phase	(Germany) Borussia Dortmund	5–2 (H)
2024–25	League phase	(Italy) Milan	1–3 (H)
2024–25	League phase	(England) Liverpool	0–2 (A)
2024–25	League phase	(Italy) Atalanta	3–2 (A)
2024–25	League phase	(Austria) Red Bull Salzburg	5–1 (H)
2024–25	League phase	(France) Brest	3–0 (A)
2024–25	Knockout phase play-off	(England) Manchester City	3–2 (A), 3–1 (H)
2024–25	Round of 16	(Spain) Atlético Madrid	2–1 (H), 0–1 (A), (4–2 p)
2024–25	Quarter-final	(England) Arsenal	0–3 (A), 1–2 (H)
2025–26	League phase	(France) Marseille	2–1 (H)
2025–26	League phase	(Kazakhstan) Kairat	5–0 (A)
2025–26	League phase	(Italy) Juventus	1–0 (H)
2025–26	League phase	(England) Liverpool	0–1 (A)
2025–26	League phase	(Greece) Olympiacos	4–3 (A)
2025–26	League phase	(England) Manchester City	1–2 (H)
2025–26	League phase	(France) Monaco	6–1 (H)
2025–26	League phase	(Portugal) Benfica	2–4 (A)
2025–26	Knockout phase play-off	(Portugal) Benfica	1–0 (A), 2–1 (H)
2025–26	Round of 16	(England) Manchester City	3–0 (H), 2–1 (A)
2025–26	Quarter-final	(Germany) Bayern Munich	1–2 (H), 3–4 (A)
2026–27	League phase	(Italy) Internazionale	2–1 (H)
2026–27	League phase	(Italy) Roma	4–3 (A)
2026–27	League phase	(Germany) RB Leipzig	4–1 (H)
2026–27	League phase	(Greece) AEK Athens	
2026–27	League phase	(Netherlands) PSV Eindhoven	
2026–27	League phase	(England) Arsenal	
2026–27	League phase	(Austria) LASK	
2026–27	League phase	(Ukraine) Shakhtar Donetsk	

== European / UEFA Cup Winners' Cup ==
The Cup Winners' Cup started in 1960 as a tournament for the winners of national cup competitions, but it took eleven years for Real Madrid to participate for the first time. In their first appearance, Madrid advanced to the final but lost there to Chelsea in a replay. In 1975, the club's second participation, Real advanced to the quarter-finals, losing to Red Star Belgrade in a two-legged tie on penalties. They advanced to their second final in 1983; however, Real's aspirations to get a hold on the trophy were cut short by Alex Ferguson's Aberdeen in a thrilling extra time victory. Madrid advanced to the quarter-finals in their last participation in 1994, before the tournament was absorbed into the UEFA Cup in 1999. This is the only European tournament to date that Real Madrid has participated in but never won.

Season	Round	Opposition	Score
1970–71	First round	(Malta) Hibernians	0–0 (A), 5–0 (H)
1970–71	Second round	(Austria) Wacker Innsbruck	0–1 (H), 2–0 (A)
1970–71	Quarter-final	(Wales) Cardiff City	0–1 (A), 2–0 (H)
1970–71	Semi-final	(Netherlands) PSV Eindhoven	0–0 (A), 2–1 (H)
1970–71	Final	(England) Chelsea	1–1 (N) (a.e.t.), 1–2 (N)
1974–75	First round	(Iceland) Fram	2–0 (A), 6–0 (H)
1974–75	Second round	Austria Wien	3–0 (H), 2–2 (A)
1974–75	Quarter-final	(Socialist Federal Republic of Yugoslavia) Red Star Belgrade	2–0 (H), 0–2 (A), 5–6 (P)
1982–83	First round	(Romania) FC Baia Mare	0–0 (A), 5–2 (H)
1982–83	Second round	(Hungary) Újpest	3–1 (H), 1–0 (A)
1982–83	Quarter-final	(Italy) Internazionale	1–1 (A), 2–1 (H)
1982–83	Semi-final	Austria Wien	2–2 (A), 3–1 (H)
1982–83	Final	(Scotland) Aberdeen	1–2 (N) (a.e.t.)
1993–94	First round	(Switzerland) Lugano	3–0 (H), 3–1 (A)
1993–94	Second round	(Austria) Wacker Innsbruck	1–1 (A), 3–0 (H)
1993–94	Quarter-final	(France) Paris Saint-Germain	0–1 (H), 1–1 (A)

== UEFA Cup / UEFA Europa League ==
The Inter-Cities Fairs Cup was established on 18 April 1955, two weeks after the European Cup, to promote trade fairs with various cities playing against each other. From 1958 onwards, the organizers moved to club participation, but the teams still had to come from cities staging trade fairs. The tournament is considered to be the forerunner of the UEFA Cup, but it is not recognized as a UEFA competition. As such, Inter-Cities Fairs Cup wins do not count toward the tally of the UEFA Cup/Europa League. Real Madrid never participated in the Fairs Cup before it was subsumed into the UEFA Cup in 1971. In the UEFA Cup, the club has won the trophy twice in a row, in 1985 and 1986. Real has never participated in the competition since it was rebranded to the UEFA Europa League.

Season	Round	Opposition	Score
1971–72	First round	(Switzerland) Basel	2–1 (A), 2–1 (H)
1971–72	Second round	(Netherlands) PSV Eindhoven	3–1 (H), 0–2 (A)
1973–74	First round	(England) Ipswich Town	0–1 (A), 0–0 (H)
1981–82	First round	(Hungary) Tatabánya	1–2 (A), 1–0 (H) (a)
1981–82	Second round	(East Germany) Carl Zeiss Jena	3–2 (H), 0–0 (A)
1981–82	Third round	(Austria) Rapid Wien	1–0 (A), 0–0 (H)
1981–82	Quarter-final	(West Germany) 1. FC Kaiserslautern	3–1 (H), 0–5 (A)
1983–84	First round	(Czechoslovakia) Sparta Prague	2–3 (A), 1–1 (H)
1984–85	First round	(Austria) Wacker Innsbruck	5–0 (H), 0–2 (A)
1984–85	Second round	(Socialist Federal Republic of Yugoslavia) Rijeka	1–3 (A), 3–0 (H)
1984–85	Third round	(Belgium) Anderlecht	0–3 (A), 6–1 (H)
1984–85	Quarter-final	(England) Tottenham Hotspur	1–0 (A), 0–0 (H)
1984–85	Semi-final	(Italy) Internazionale	0–2 (A), 3–0 (H)
1984–85	Final	(Hungary) Videoton	3–0 (A), 0–1 (H)
1985–86	First round	(Greece) AEK Athens	0–1 (A), 5–0 (H)
1985–86	Second round	(Soviet Union) Chornomorets Odessa	2–1 (H), 0–0 (A)
1985–86	Third round	(West Germany) Borussia Mönchengladbach	1–5 (A), 4–0 (H) (a)
1985–86	Quarter-final	(Switzerland) Neuchâtel	3–0 (H), 0–2 (A)
1985–86	Semi-final	(Italy) Internazionale	1–3 (A), 5–1 (H) (a.e.t.)
1985–86	Final	(West Germany) 1. FC Köln	5–1 (H), 0–2 (A)
1991–92	First round	(Czechoslovakia) Slovan Bratislava	2–1 (A), 1–1 (H)
1991–92	Second round	(Netherlands) Utrecht	3–1 (A), 1–0 (H)
1991–92	Third round	(Switzerland) Neuchâtel	0–1 (A), 4–0 (H)
1991–92	Quarter-final	(Czechoslovakia) Sigma Olomouc	1–1 (A), 1–0 (H)
1991–92	Semi-final	(Italy) Torino	2–1 (H), 0–2 (A)
1992–93	First round	(Romania) FC Timişoara	1–1 (A), 4–0 (H)
1992–93	Second round	(Russia) Torpedo Moscow	5–2 (H), 2–3 (A)
1992–93	Third round	(Netherlands) Vitesse	1–0 (A), 1–0 (H)
1992–93	Quarter-final	(France) Paris Saint-Germain	3–1 (H), 1–4 (A)
1994–95	First round	(Portugal) Sporting CP	1–0 (H), 1–2 (A) (a)
1994–95	Second round	(Russia) Dynamo Moscow	2–2 (A), 4–0 (H)
1994–95	Third round	(Denmark) Odense BK	3–2 (A), 0–2 (H)

== European / UEFA Super Cup ==
The European Super Cup was inaugurated in 1973 as a way of determining the best team in Europe, by pitting the holders of the European Champion Clubs' Cup against the winners of the Cup Winners' Cup. Since 2000, it has been contested by winners of the Champions League and the UEFA Cup (later Europa League), as the Cup Winners' Cup was discontinued in 1999. Real Madrid first participated in the 1998 edition, after they won the 1997–98 UEFA Champions League, losing 0–1 to Chelsea. Real's first trophy came in 2002 with a 3–1 victory over Feyenoord. Since then, they have won the Super Cup a further five times, in 2014, 2016, 2017, 2022, and 2024, winning more titles than any other club.

Year	Opposing team	Score	Venue
1998	(England) Chelsea	0–1	Stade Louis II, Monaco
2000	(Turkey) Galatasaray	1–2 (gg in a.e.t.)	Stade Louis II, Monaco
2002	(Netherlands) Feyenoord	3–1	Stade Louis II, Monaco
2014	(Spain) Sevilla	2–0	Cardiff City Stadium, Cardiff
2016	(Spain) Sevilla	3–2 (a.e.t.)	Lerkendal Stadion, Trondheim
2017	(England) Manchester United	2–1	Philip II Arena, Skopje
2018	(Spain) Atlético Madrid	2–4 (a.e.t.)	A. Le Coq Arena, Tallinn
2022	(Germany) Eintracht Frankfurt	2–0	Olympic Stadium, Helsinki
2024	(Italy) Atalanta	2–0	National Stadium, Warsaw

== Intercontinental Cup / FIFA Club World Cup ==
In 1960, UEFA and their South-American equivalent, the South American Football Confederation (CONMEBOL), created the Intercontinental Cup as a way of determining the best team in the world, by pitting the winners of the European Cup and the Copa Libertadores against each other. In 2000, FIFA launched their international club competition called the FIFA Club World Championship, featuring teams from all of its member associations. In the second edition — renamed the FIFA Club World Cup — in 2005, FIFA took over the Intercontinental Cup, subsuming it into its own competition.

In January 2000, Real Madrid were invited to the inaugural championship in Brazil, by virtue of winning the 1998 Intercontinental Cup in the previous season. The club finished fourth overall, after losing the third place play-off on penalties to Mexico's Necaxa. They initially qualified for the 2001 tournament, in their native Spain, but the competition was cancelled before it started. Real Madrid have won the FIFA Club World Cup a record five times since then (in 2014, 2016, 2017, 2018 and 2022). They also won the inaugural FIFA Intercontinental Cup in 2024.

Year	Competition	Round	Opposing team	Home	Away	Aggregate
1960	Intercontinental Cup	Final	(Uruguay) Peñarol	5–1	0–0	5–1
1966	Intercontinental Cup	Final	(Uruguay) Peñarol	0–2	0–2	0–4
1998	Intercontinental Cup	Final	(Brazil) Vasco da Gama	2–1 (N)		
2000	FIFA Club World Championship	Group A	(Saudi Arabia) Al-Nassr	3–1 (N)		
2000	FIFA Club World Championship	Group A	(Brazil) Corinthians	2–2 (N)		
2000	FIFA Club World Championship	Group A	(Morocco) Raja Casablanca	3–2 (N)		
2000	FIFA Club World Championship	Third place play-off	(Mexico) Necaxa	1–1 (a.e.t.) (3–4 p) (N)		
2000	Intercontinental Cup	Final	(Argentina) Boca Juniors	1–2 (N)		
2002	Intercontinental Cup	Final	(Paraguay) Olimpia	2–0 (N)		
2014	FIFA Club World Cup	Semi-final	(Mexico) Cruz Azul	4–0 (N)		
2014	FIFA Club World Cup	Final	(Argentina) San Lorenzo	2–0 (N)		
2016	FIFA Club World Cup	Semi-final	(Mexico) América	2–0 (N)		
2016	FIFA Club World Cup	Final	(Japan) Kashima Antlers	4–2 (a.e.t.) (N)		
2017	FIFA Club World Cup	Semi-final	(United Arab Emirates) Al-Jazira	2–1 (N)		
2017	FIFA Club World Cup	Final	(Brazil) Grêmio	1–0 (N)		
2018	FIFA Club World Cup	Semi-final	(Japan) Kashima Antlers	3–1 (N)		
2018	FIFA Club World Cup	Final	(United Arab Emirates) Al Ain	4–1 (N)		
2022	FIFA Club World Cup	Semi-final	(Egypt) Al Ahly	4–1 (N)		
2022	FIFA Club World Cup	Final	(Saudi Arabia) Al-Hilal	5–3 (N)		
2024	FIFA Intercontinental Cup	Final	(Mexico) Pachuca	3–0 (N)		
2025	FIFA Club World Cup	Group H	(Saudi Arabia) Al-Hilal	1–1 (N)		
2025	FIFA Club World Cup	Group H	(Mexico) Pachuca	3–1 (N)		
2025	FIFA Club World Cup	Group H	(Austria) Red Bull Salzburg	3–0 (N)		
2025	FIFA Club World Cup	Round of 16	(Italy) Juventus	1–0 (N)		
2025	FIFA Club World Cup	Quarter-final	(Germany) Borussia Dortmund	3–2 (N)		
2025	FIFA Club World Cup	Semi-final	(France) Paris Saint-Germain	0–4 (N)		

== Copa Iberoamericana ==
The Copa Iberoamericana was a one-off international football competition. It was created to face the champions of the Copa de Oro Nicolás Leoz and the Copa del Rey, as a result of an agreement signed between CONMEBOL and the Royal Spanish Football Federation.

It was disputed only once between Boca Juniors and Real Madrid in 1994, with the Spanish club prevailing 4–3 on aggregate. In 2015, CONMEBOL included Copa Iberoamericana in the list of its official competitions.

Year	Round	Opposing team	Home	Away	Aggregate
1994	Final	(Argentina) Boca Juniors	3–1	1–2	4–3

== Overall record ==
Accurate as of 21 October 2026.

Competition	Played	Won	Drew	Lost	GF	GA	GD	Win%
European Cup / Champions League	520	314	85	121	1,147	583	+564	60.38
Cup Winners' Cup	31	16	9	6	57	24	+33	51.61
UEFA Cup/Europa League	64	33	10	21	111	75	+36	51.56
Latin Cup	4	4	0	0	10	1	+9	100.00
UEFA Super Cup	9	6	0	3	17	11	+6	66.67
Copa Iberoamericana	2	1	0	1	4	3	+1	50.00
Intercontinental Cup / Club World Cup	27	19	4	4	61	31	+30	70.37
FIFA Intercontinental Cup	1	1	0	0	3	0	+3	100.00
Total	658	394	108	156	1,410	728	+682	59.88

Legend: GF = Goals For. GA = Goals Against. GD = Goal Difference.

== Head-to-head record ==
The following table shows Real Madrid's all-time European and international record.

As of 21 October 2026

Positive record Neutral record Negative record

Friendly matches are not included in the following records.

Clubs faced by Real Madrid in international and European competitions
Country	Club	Pld	W	D	L	GF	GA	GD	W %
AFC
Japan
Japan	Kashima Antlers	2	2	0	0	7	3	+4	100.00
Saudi Arabia
Saudi Arabia	Al-Hilal	2	1	1	0	6	4	+2	50.00
Saudi Arabia	Al-Nassr	1	1	0	0	3	1	+2	100.00
United Arab Emirates
United Arab Emirates	Al Ain	1	1	0	0	4	1	+3	100.00
United Arab Emirates	Al Jazira	1	1	0	0	2	1	+1	100.00
CAF
Egypt
Egypt	Al Ahly	1	1	0	0	4	1	+3	100.00
Morocco
Morocco	Raja CA	1	1	0	0	3	2	+1	100.00
CONCACAF
Mexico
Mexico	América	1	1	0	0	2	0	+2	100.00
Mexico	Cruz Azul	1	1	0	0	4	0	+4	100.00
Mexico	Necaxa	1	0	1	0	1	1	+0	0.00
Mexico	Pachuca	2	2	0	0	6	1	+5	100.00
CONMEBOL
Argentina
Argentina	Boca Juniors	3	1	0	2	5	5	+0	33.33
Argentina	San Lorenzo	1	1	0	0	2	0	+2	100.00
Brazil
Brazil	Corinthians	1	0	1	0	2	2	+0	0.00
Brazil	Grêmio	1	1	0	0	1	0	+1	100.00
Brazil	Vasco da Gama	1	1	0	0	2	1	+1	100.00
Paraguay
Paraguay	Olimpia	1	1	0	0	2	0	+2	100.00
Uruguay
Uruguay	Peñarol	4	1	1	2	5	5	+0	25.00
UEFA
Austria
Austria	Austria Wien	4	2	2	0	10	5	+5	50.00
Austria	Rapid Wien	7	4	1	2	10	7	+3	57.14
Austria	Red Bull Salzburg	2	2	0	0	8	1	+7	100.00
Austria	Sturm Graz	2	2	0	0	11	2	+9	100.00
Austria	Wacker Innsbruck	8	4	2	2	22	7	+15	50.00
Austria	Wiener Sport-Club	2	1	1	0	7	1	+6	50.00
Belarus
Belarus	BATE Borisov	2	2	0	0	3	0	+3	100.00
Belgium
Belgium	Anderlecht	10	5	1	4	23	15	+8	50.00
Belgium	Antwerp	2	2	0	0	8	1	+7	100.00
Belgium	Club Brugge	4	1	2	1	5	5	+0	25.00
Belgium	Genk	2	1	1	0	7	1	+6	50.00
Belgium	Standard Liège	4	2	0	2	8	4	+4	50.00
Bulgaria
Bulgaria	Levski Sofia	2	2	0	0	3	0	+3	100.00
Bulgaria	Ludogorets Razgrad	2	2	0	0	6	1	+5	100.00
Croatia
Croatia	Dinamo Zagreb	2	2	0	0	7	2	+5	100.00
Croatia	Rijeka	2	1	0	1	4	3	+1	50.00
Cyprus
Cyprus	AEL Limassol	2	2	0	0	12	0	+12	100.00
Cyprus	APOEL	4	4	0	0	17	2	+15	100.00
Cyprus	Olympiakos Nicosia	2	2	0	0	14	1	+13	100.00
Czech Republic
Czech Republic	Příbram	2	1	1	0	6	2	+4	50.00
Czech Republic	Sigma Olomouc	2	1	1	0	2	1	+1	50.00
Czech Republic	Sparta Prague	6	3	1	2	13	8	+5	50.00
Czech Republic	Viktoria Plzeň	2	2	0	0	7	1	+6	100.00
Denmark
Denmark	Boldklubben 1909	2	2	0	0	9	2	+7	100.00
Denmark	Boldklubben 1913	2	2	0	0	12	0	+12	100.00
Denmark	Copenhagen	2	2	0	0	6	0	+6	100.00
Denmark	Hvidovre	2	1	1	0	6	3	+3	50.00
Denmark	Odense BK	4	3	0	1	13	5	+8	75.00
England
England	Arsenal	4	0	1	3	1	6	−5	0.00
England	Chelsea	9	3	2	4	12	11	+1	33.33
England	Derby County	2	1	0	1	6	5	+1	50.00
England	Ipswich Town	2	0	1	1	0	1	−1	0.00
England	Leeds United	2	2	0	0	5	2	+3	100.00
England	Liverpool	13	7	1	5	17	13	+4	53.85
England	Manchester City	17	7	5	5	30	27	+3	41.18
England	Manchester United	11	5	4	2	22	17	+5	45.45
England	Tottenham Hotspur	6	3	2	1	8	4	+4	50.00
France
France	Auxerre	2	2	0	0	5	0	+5	100.00
France	Brest	1	1	0	0	3	0	+3	100.00
France	Lille	1	0	0	1	0	1	−1	0.00
France	Lyon	10	3	4	3	14	11	+3	30.00
France	Marseille	5	5	0	0	14	5	+9	100.00
France	Monaco	3	2	0	1	11	6	+5	66.67
France	Nice	4	3	0	1	12	5	+7	75.00
France	Paris Saint-Germain	13	5	3	5	16	20	−4	38.46
France	Reims	3	3	0	0	8	3	+5	100.00
Germany
Germany	1. FC Kaiserslautern	2	1	0	1	3	6	−3	50.00
Germany	1860 Munich	2	1	0	1	3	2	+1	50.00
Germany	1. FC Köln	2	1	0	1	5	3	+2	50.00
Germany	Bayer Leverkusen	7	4	2	1	15	11	+4	57.14
Germany	Bayern Munich	30	13	4	13	49	48	+1	43.33
Germany	Borussia Dortmund	17	9	5	3	34	23	+11	52.94
Germany	Borussia Mönchengladbach	6	2	3	1	12	10	+2	33.33
Germany	Carl Zeiss Jena	2	1	1	0	3	2	+1	50.00
Germany	Eintracht Frankfurt	2	2	0	0	9	3	+6	100.00
Germany	Hamburger SV	2	1	0	1	3	5	−2	50.00
Germany	RB Leipzig	5	3	1	1	10	5	+5	60.00
Germany	Schalke 04	4	3	0	1	14	6	+8	75.00
Germany	VfB Stuttgart	1	1	0	0	3	1	+2	100.00
Germany	Union Berlin	2	2	0	0	4	2	+2	100.00
Germany	Werder Bremen	2	1	0	1	4	4	+0	50.00
Germany	VfL Wolfsburg	2	1	0	1	3	2	+1	50.00
Greece
Greece	AEK Athens	4	1	2	1	10	6	+4	25.00
Greece	Olympiacos	9	5	3	1	22	12	+10	55.56
Greece	Panathinaikos	2	1	1	0	5	2	+3	50.00
Hungary
Hungary	Budapest Honvéd	2	2	0	0	3	0	+3	100.00
Hungary	Fehérvár	2	1	0	1	3	1	+2	50.00
Hungary	Ferencvárosi	2	1	1	0	7	2	+5	50.00
Hungary	Tatabányai	2	1	0	1	2	2	+0	50.00
Hungary	Újpest	2	2	0	0	4	1	+3	100.00
Hungary	Vasas	4	3	0	1	9	3	+6	75.00
Iceland
Iceland	Fram Reykjavík	2	2	0	0	8	0	+8	100.00
Iceland	Keflavík	2	2	0	0	4	0	+4	100.00
(Republic of Ireland) Ireland
(Republic of Ireland) Ireland	Limerick	2	2	0	0	7	2	+5	100.00
Italy
Italy	Atalanta	4	4	0	0	9	3	+6	100.00
Italy	Fiorentina	1	1	0	0	2	0	+2	100.00
Italy	Inter Milan	20	11	2	7	30	22	+8	55.00
Italy	Juventus	23	12	2	9	28	25	+3	52.17
Italy	Lazio	4	2	2	0	10	7	+3	50.00
Italy	Milan	17	7	3	7	30	29	+1	41.18
Italy	Napoli	6	5	1	0	16	7	+9	83.33
Italy	Roma	13	9	1	3	28	12	+16	69.23
Italy	Torino	2	1	0	1	2	3	−1	50.00
Kazakhstan
Kazakhstan	Kairat	1	1	0	0	5	0	+5	100.00
Luxembourg
Luxembourg	Jeunesse Esch	2	2	0	0	12	2	+10	100.00
Luxembourg	Progrès Niederkorn	2	2	0	0	12	0	+12	100.00
Luxembourg	Spora Luxembourg	2	2	0	0	9	0	+9	100.00
Malta
Malta	Hibernians	2	1	1	0	5	0	+5	50.00
Moldova
Moldova	Sheriff Tiraspol	2	1	0	1	4	2	+2	50.00
Netherlands
Netherlands	Ajax	14	8	1	5	27	15	+12	57.14
Netherlands	Feyenoord	3	2	0	1	9	3	+6	66.67
Netherlands	PSV Eindhoven	8	3	4	1	9	7	+2	37.50
Netherlands	Utrecht	2	2	0	0	4	1	+3	100.00
Netherlands	Vitesse	2	2	0	0	2	0	+2	100.00
Norway
Norway	Molde	2	2	0	0	5	1	+4	100.00
Norway	Moss	2	2	0	0	4	0	+4	100.00
Norway	Rosenborg	6	5	0	1	14	5	+9	83.33
Poland
Poland	Górnik Zabrze	2	2	0	0	4	2	+2	100.00
Poland	Legia Warsaw	2	1	1	0	8	4	+4	50.00
Poland	Stal Mielec	2	2	0	0	3	1	+2	100.00
Poland	Wisła Kraków	2	2	0	0	5	1	+4	100.00
Portugal
Portugal	Belenenses	1	1	0	0	2	0	+2	100.00
Portugal	Benfica	7	4	0	3	12	16	−4	57.14
Portugal	Braga	2	2	0	0	5	1	+4	100.00
Portugal	Porto	12	9	1	2	23	10	+13	75.00
Portugal	Sporting CP	6	4	1	1	12	6	+6	66.67
Romania
Romania	Argeș Pitești	2	1	0	1	4	3	+1	50.00
Romania	Dinamo București	4	3	0	1	12	6	+6	75.00
Romania	FCSB	2	2	0	0	5	1	+4	100.00
Romania	Minaur Baia Mare	2	1	1	0	5	2	+3	50.00
Romania	Politehnica Timișoara	2	1	1	0	5	1	+4	50.00
Russia
Russia	CSKA Moscow	4	1	1	2	5	6	−1	25.00
Russia	Dynamo Moscow	2	1	1	0	6	2	+4	50.00
Russia	Lokomotiv Moscow	4	2	1	1	7	4	+3	50.00
Russia	Spartak Moscow	8	3	2	3	7	7	+0	37.50
Russia	Torpedo Moscow	2	1	0	1	7	5	+2	50.00
Russia	Zenit Saint Petersburg	2	2	0	0	5	1	+4	100.00
Scotland
Scotland	Aberdeen	1	0	0	1	1	2	−1	0.00
Scotland	Celtic	4	3	0	1	11	3	+8	75.00
Scotland	Kilmarnock	2	1	1	0	7	3	+4	50.00
Scotland	Rangers	2	2	0	0	7	0	+7	100.00
Serbia
Serbia	Partizan	5	3	1	1	7	4	+3	60.00
Serbia	Red Star Belgrade	4	2	0	2	6	6	+0	50.00
Slovakia
Slovakia	Slovan Bratislava	2	1	1	0	3	2	+1	50.00
Spain
Spain	Atlético Madrid	12	6	2	4	18	13	+5	50.00
Spain	Barcelona	8	3	3	2	13	10	+3	37.50
Spain	Sevilla	4	3	1	0	15	4	+11	75.00
Spain	Valencia	1	1	0	0	3	0	+3	100.00
Sweden
Sweden	Malmö FF	2	2	0	0	10	0	+10	100.00
Switzerland
Switzerland	Basel	4	4	0	0	10	3	+7	100.00
Switzerland	Grasshopper	4	3	0	1	7	3	+4	75.00
Switzerland	Lugano	2	2	0	0	6	1	+5	100.00
Switzerland	Neuchâtel Xamax	4	2	0	2	7	3	+4	50.00
Switzerland	Servette	2	2	0	0	7	0	+7	100.00
Switzerland	Young Boys	2	1	0	1	5	1	+4	50.00
Switzerland	Zürich	4	4	0	0	14	3	+11	100.00
Turkey
Turkey	Beşiktaş	2	1	1	0	3	1	+2	50.00
Turkey	Galatasaray	9	6	0	3	28	10	+18	66.67
Ukraine
Ukraine	Chornomorets Odesa	2	1	1	0	2	1	+1	50.00
Ukraine	Dynamo Kyiv	10	4	5	1	18	11	+7	40.00
Ukraine	Shakhtar Donetsk	8	5	1	2	20	11	+9	62.50
Wales
Wales	Cardiff City	2	1	0	1	2	1	+1	50.00
Total: 160 clubs		658	394	108	156	1,410	728	+682	59.88
