= 2017 FIFA Club World Cup final =

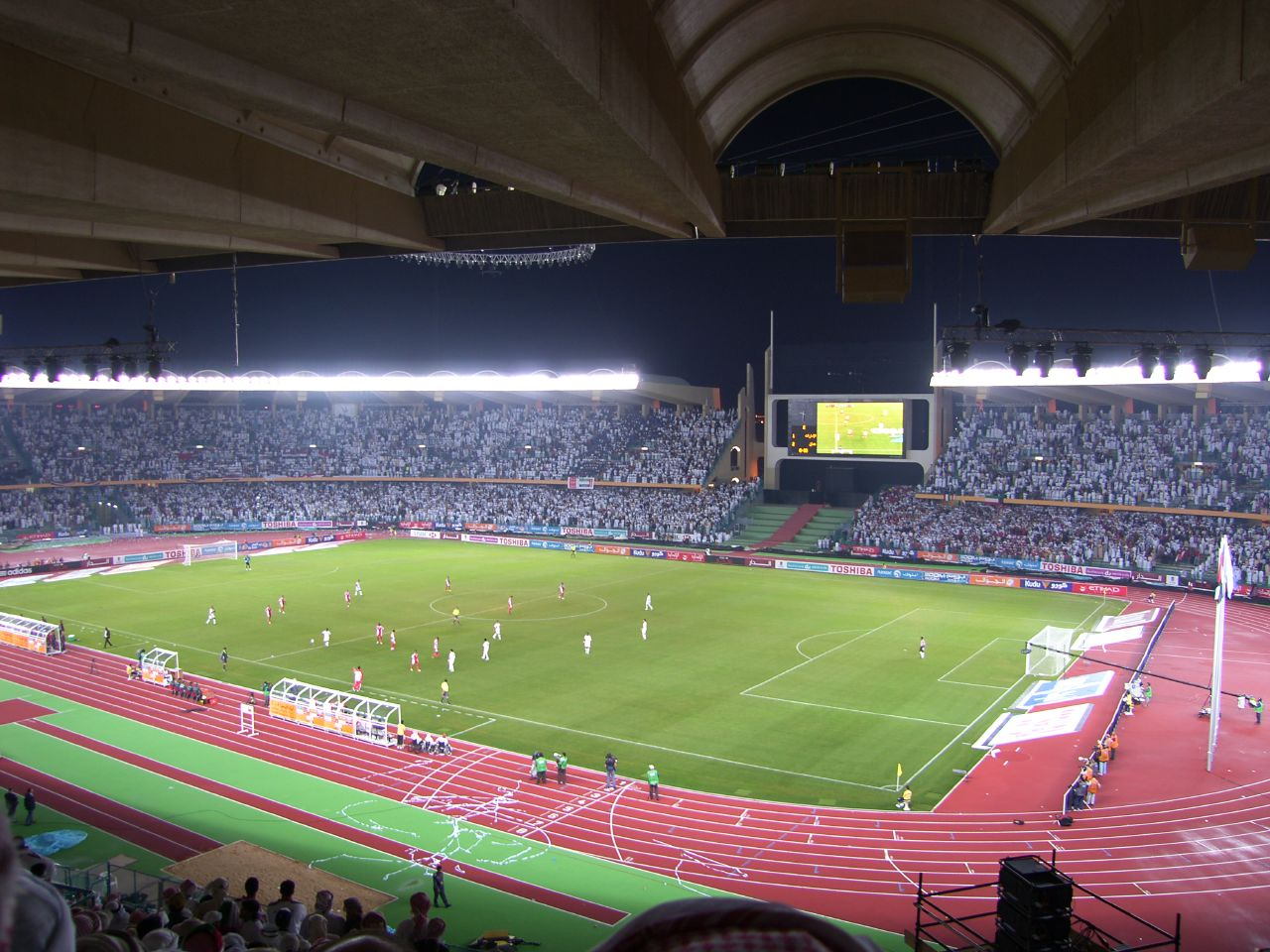
- The Zayed Sports City Stadium in Abu Dhabi staged the final
- Event: 2017 FIFA Club World Cup
Real Madrid	Grêmio
(Spain)	(Brazil)
1	0
- Date: 16 December 2017
- Venue: Zayed Sports City Stadium, Abu Dhabi
- Man of the Match: Cristiano Ronaldo (Real Madrid)
- Referee: César Ramos (Mexico)
- Attendance: 41,094
- Weather: Cloudy; 22 °C (72 °F); 73% humidity

The 2017 FIFA Club World Cup final was the final match of the 2017 FIFA Club World Cup, the 14th edition of the FIFA Club World Cup, a FIFA-organised football tournament contested by the winners of the six continental confederations, as well as the host nation's league champions. The final was played at the Zayed Sports City Stadium in Abu Dhabi, United Arab Emirates on 16 December 2017 and was contested between Spanish club and title holders Real Madrid, representing UEFA as the reigning champions of the UEFA Champions League, and Brazilian club Grêmio, representing CONMEBOL as the reigning champions of the Copa Libertadores.

Real Madrid won the match 1–0 via a goal from Cristiano Ronaldo for their third FIFA Club World Cup title. This was the first time a team had successfully defended the FIFA Club World Cup title, after Real won the previous year. The victory also marked the tenth time a UEFA team had won the Club World Cup.

== Teams ==
Team	Confederation	Previous club world championship finals
(Spain) Real Madrid	UEFA	IC: 5 (1960, 1966, 1998, 2000, 2002); FCWC: 2 (2014, 2016)
(Brazil) Grêmio	CONMEBOL	None

== Venue ==
The Zayed Sports City Stadium in Abu Dhabi was announced as the final venue on 11 April 2017. The stadium had previously hosted the final in 2009 and 2010.

== Background ==
The FIFA Club World Cup, held annually in December, is contested between the winners of continental club competitions and the winners of the host nation's league.

Real Madrid qualified for their fourth Club World Cup by winning the 2016–17 UEFA Champions League. The club previously won the 2014 and 2016 editions of the Club World Cup, second only to Barcelona in number of wins. Madrid entered the competition in the semi-finals, facing UAE Pro-League champions Al-Jazira, who had won against Oceania champion Auckland City FC of New Zealand and Asian champions Urawa Red Diamonds of Japan. Real Madrid won the match 2–1, after controversial decisions by the referee and video assistant referee system.

Brazilian club Grêmio qualified for their first Club World Cup by winning the 2017 Copa Libertadores in November. They entered the semi-finals round, facing North American champions Pachuca of Mexico, who had defeated African champions Wydad Casablanca of Morocco in the quarter-finals. Grêmio won the match 1–0 in extra time, on a goal scored by Éverton in the 95th minute.

== Road to the final ==
(Spain) Real Madrid		Team	(Brazil) Grêmio	
Winners of the 2016–17 UEFA Champions League		Qualification	Winners of the 2017 Copa Libertadores	
Opponent	Result	2017 FIFA Club World Cup	Opponent	Result
(United Arab Emirates) Al-Jazira	2–1	Semi-finals	(Mexico) Pachuca	1–0 (a.e.t.)

== Match ==
=== Summary ===
Cristiano Ronaldo scored the only goal of the match in the 53rd minute for Real Madrid, a right foot free-kick from 25 yards out slightly to the left that went through a gap in the defensive wall and into the left corner of the net.

=== Details ===
16 December 2017
21:00 GST

Real Madrid (Spain)	1–0	(Brazil) Grêmio
Ronaldo 53'	Report

Zayed Sports City Stadium, Abu Dhabi
Attendance: 41,094
Referee: César Ramos (Mexico)

Real Madrid	Grêmio

GK	1	(Costa Rica) Keylor Navas
RB	2	(Spain) Dani Carvajal
CB	5	(France) Raphaël Varane
CB	4	(Spain) Sergio Ramos (c)
LB	12	(Brazil) Marcelo
CM	10	(Croatia) Luka Modrić
CM	14	(Brazil) Casemiro	(yellow card) 27'
CM	8	(Germany) Toni Kroos
RW	22	(Spain) Isco		(substituted off) 73'
LW	7	(Portugal) Cristiano Ronaldo
CF	9	(France) Karim Benzema		(substituted off) 79'
Substitutes:
GK	13	(Spain) Kiko Casilla
GK	35	(Spain) Moha Ramos
DF	3	(Spain) Jesús Vallejo
DF	6	(Spain) Nacho
DF	15	(France) Théo Hernandez
DF	19	(Morocco) Achraf Hakimi
MF	18	(Spain) Marcos Llorente
MF	20	(Spain) Marco Asensio
MF	23	(Croatia) Mateo Kovačić
MF	24	(Spain) Dani Ceballos
FW	11	(Wales) Gareth Bale		(substituted on) 79'
FW	17	(Spain) Lucas Vázquez		(substituted on) 73'
FW	21	(Spain) Borja Mayoral
Manager:
(France) Zinedine Zidane

GK	1	(Brazil) Marcelo Grohe
RB	2	(Brazil) Edílson
CB	3	(Brazil) Pedro Geromel (c)
CB	4	(Argentina) Walter Kannemann
LB	12	(Brazil) Bruno Cortez
CM	5	(Brazil) Michel	(substituted off) 84'
CM	25	(Brazil) Jailson
RW	17	(Brazil) Ramiro	(substituted off) 71'
AM	7	(Brazil) Luan
LW	21	(Brazil) Fernandinho
CF	18	(Paraguay) Lucas Barrios	(substituted off) 63'
Substitutes:
GK	30	(Brazil) Bruno Grassi
GK	48	(Brazil) Paulo Victor
DF	6	(Brazil) Leonardo Gomes
DF	14	(Brazil) Bruno Rodrigo
DF	15	(Brazil) Rafael Thyere
DF	22	(Brazil) Bressan
DF	26	(Brazil) Marcelo Oliveira
DF	88	(Brazil) Léo Moura
MF	8	(Brazil) Maicon	(substituted on) 84'
MF	28	(Brazil) Kaio
FW	9	(Brazil) Jael	(substituted on) 63'
FW	11	(Brazil) Everton	(substituted on) 71'
Manager:
(Brazil) Renato Gaúcho

Man of the Match:
Cristiano Ronaldo (Real Madrid)

Assistant referees:
Marvin Torrentera (Mexico)
Miguel Ángel Hernández (Mexico)
Fourth official:
Ravshan Irmatov (Uzbekistan)
Video assistant referees:
Mark Geiger (United States)
Jakhongir Saidov (Uzbekistan)
Assistant video assistant referee:
Felix Zwayer (Germany)

Match rules

- 90 minutes.
- 30 minutes of extra time if necessary.
- Penalty shoot-out if scores still level.
- Twelve named substitutes.
- Maximum of three substitutions, with a fourth being allowed in extra time.

=== Statistics ===
First half
Statistic	Real Madrid	Grêmio
Goals scored	0	0
Total shots	9	1
Shots on target	1	0
Saves	0	1
Ball possession	63%	37%
Corner kicks	6	1
Fouls committed	7	5
Offsides	1	0
Yellow cards	1	0
Red cards	0	0

Second half
Statistic	Real Madrid	Grêmio
Goals scored	1	0
Total shots	11	0
Shots on target	6	0
Saves	0	5
Ball possession	61%	39%
Corner kicks	3	0
Fouls committed	7	7
Offsides	1	0
Yellow cards	0	0
Red cards	0	0

Overall
Statistic	Real Madrid	Grêmio
Goals scored	1	0
Total shots	20	1
Shots on target	7	0
Saves	0	6
Ball possession	62%	38%
Corner kicks	9	1
Fouls committed	14	12
Offsides	2	0
Yellow cards	1	0
Red cards	0	0

== See also ==
- Real Madrid CF in international football competitions
