= Marwa Range =

Kenyan football referee (born 1977)

Aden Marwa Range (born 31 January 1977) is a football referee from Kenya.

== Career ==
Marwa has served as a FIFA referee since 2011. He is the first Kenyan football official to be involved in any FIFA competition, having featured in the 2011 FIFA U-17 World Cup. He was named as an assistant referee in the 2012 and 2013 Africa Cup of Nations. Marwa was named as a reserve official at the 2014 FIFA World Cup and an assistant referee at the 2016 FIFA Club World Cup. He was included as CAF's assistant referee in the 2017 FIFA Confederations Cup, where he served alongside Bakary Gassama, Jean-Claude Birumushahu and Malang Diedhiou.

=== 2018 FIFA World Cup removal ===
Marwa was due to officiate at the 2018 FIFA World Cup in Russia, but a week before the tournament was due to start, the BBC released an investigation conducted by a Ghanaian journalist which implicated Marwa in a bribery scandal. He was filmed receiving $600 US dollars before a previous game. He subsequently withdrew from the World Cup.
