= 2017 FIFA Club World Cup =

FIFA Club World Cup UAE 2017 presented by Alibaba Cloud كأس العالم للأندية لكرة القدم الإمارات العربية المتحدة 2017

Tournament details
- Host country: United Arab Emirates
- Dates: 6–16 December
- Teams: 7 (from 6 confederations)
- Venues: 2 (in 2 host cities)

Final positions
- Champions: (Spain) Real Madrid (3rd title)
- Runners-up: (Brazil) Grêmio
- Third place: (Mexico) Pachuca
- Fourth place: (United Arab Emirates) Al-Jazira

Tournament statistics
- Matches played: 8
- Goals scored: 18 (2.25 per match)
- Attendance: 132,565 (16,571 per match)
- Top scorer(s): (Brazil) Maurício Antônio (Brazil) Romarinho (Portugal) Cristiano Ronaldo (2 goals each)
- Best player: (Croatia) Luka Modrić
- Fair play award: (Spain) Real Madrid

The 2017 FIFA Club World Cup (officially known as the FIFA Club World Cup UAE 2017 presented by Alibaba Cloud for sponsorship reasons) was the 14th edition of the FIFA Club World Cup, a FIFA-organised international club football tournament between the winners of the six continental confederations, as well as the host nation's league champions. The tournament was hosted by the United Arab Emirates.

Real Madrid were the defending champions. They qualified for the tournament as the winners of the 2016–17 UEFA Champions League, becoming the first defending champions to qualify for the subsequent tournament, and after defeating Grêmio 1–0 in the final, became the first team to successfully defend the title.

== Host bids ==
The application process for the 2017–2018 as well as the 2015–2016 editions, i.e. two hosts, each hosting two years, began in February 2014. Member associations interested in hosting must submit a declaration of interest by 30 March 2014, and provide the complete set of bidding documents by 25 August 2014. The FIFA Executive Committee was to select the hosts at their meeting in Morocco in December 2014, but the final decision was delayed until the FIFA's executive committee meetings on 19–20 March 2015.

The following countries expressed an interest in bidding to host the tournament:

- Brazil
- Japan
- United Arab Emirates

The FIFA Executive Committee officially confirmed the United Arab Emirates as hosts of the 2017 and 2018 tournaments on 20 March 2015 during their meeting in Zürich, Switzerland.

== Qualified teams ==
Location of teams of the 2017 FIFA Club World Cup.

Team	Confederation	Qualification	Qualified date	Participation (bold indicates winners)
Entering in the semi-finals
(Brazil) Grêmio	CONMEBOL	Winners of the 2017 Copa Libertadores	29 November 2017	Debut
(Spain) Real Madrid^{TH}	UEFA	Winners of the 2016–17 UEFA Champions League	3 June 2017	4th (Previous: 2000, **2014**, **2016**)
Entering in the second round
(Japan) Urawa Red Diamonds	AFC	Winners of the 2017 AFC Champions League	25 November 2017	2nd (Previous: 2007)
(Morocco) Wydad Casablanca	CAF	Winners of the 2017 CAF Champions League	4 November 2017	Debut
(Mexico) Pachuca	CONCACAF	Winners of the 2016–17 CONCACAF Champions League	26 April 2017	4th (Previous: 2007, 2008, 2010)
Entering in the first round
(New Zealand) Auckland City	OFC	Winners of the 2017 OFC Champions League	7 May 2017	9th (Previous: 2006, 2009, 2011, 2012, 2013, 2014, 2015, 2016)
(United Arab Emirates) Al-Jazira	AFC (host)	Winners of the 2016–17 UAE Pro League	11 September 2017 (Note: Al-Jazira won the 2016–17 UAE Pro League on 29 April 2017. Their participation in the 2017 FIFA Club World Cup was officially confirmed on 11 September 2017 after Al-Ain became the last team from the United Arab Emirates to be eliminated from the 2017 AFC Champions League.)	Debut

== Venues ==
The two venues were the Zayed Sports City Stadium in Abu Dhabi and the Hazza bin Zayed Stadium in Al Ain.

Al Ain	Abu Dhabi	Location of the host cities of the 2017 FIFA Club World Cup.
Hazza bin Zayed Stadium	Zayed Sports City Stadium	Location of the host cities of the 2017 FIFA Club World Cup.
24°14′44.14″N 55°42′59.7″E	24°24′57.92″N 54°27′12.93″E	Location of the host cities of the 2017 FIFA Club World Cup.
Capacity: 22,717	Capacity: 43,000	Location of the host cities of the 2017 FIFA Club World Cup.

== Match officials ==
A total of six referees, twelve assistant referees, and eight video assistant referees were appointed for the tournament.

Confederation	Referee	Assistant referees	Video assistant referee
AFC	(Uzbekistan) Ravshan Irmatov	(Uzbekistan) Abdukhamidullo Rasulov (Uzbekistan) Jakhongir Saidov	(Qatar) Abdulrahman Al-Jassim
CAF	(Senegal) Malang Diedhiou	(Senegal) Djibril Camara (Senegal) El Hadji Malick Samba	
CONCACAF	(Mexico) César Ramos	(Mexico) Marvin Torrentera (Mexico) Miguel Ángel Hernández	(United States) Mark Geiger
CONMEBOL	(Brazil) Sandro Ricci	(Brazil) Emerson de Carvalho (Brazil) Marcelo van Gasse	(Uruguay) Andrés Cunha (Brazil) Wilton Sampaio (Argentina) Mauro Vigliano
OFC	(New Zealand) Matthew Conger	(New Zealand) Simon Lount (Tonga) Tevita Makasini	
UEFA	(Germany) Felix Brych	(Germany) Mark Borsch (Germany) Stefan Lupp	(Portugal) Artur Soares Dias (France) Clément Turpin (Germany) Felix Zwayer

== Organization ==
The following were key milestones in the organization of the tournament:

- The official emblem of the tournament, as well as the match schedule, was unveiled on 11 April 2017.

== Squads ==
Each team had to name a 23-man squad (three of whom must be goalkeepers). Injury replacements were allowed until 24 hours before the team's first match. The official squads were confirmed by FIFA on 30 November 2017.

== Matches ==
The draw was held on 9 October 2017, 12:00 GST (UTC+4), at Abu Dhabi to determine the matchups of the second round, and which teams the two second round winners would play in the semi-finals. At the time of the draw, the identity of the teams representing AFC, CAF, and CONMEBOL were not known.

If a match was tied after normal playing time:

- For elimination matches, extra time would be played. If still tied after extra time, a penalty shoot-out would be held to determine the winners.
- For matches for fifth place and third place, extra time would not be played and a penalty shoot-out would be held to determine the winners.

First round
6 December – Al Ain
(United Arab Emirates) Al-Jazira	1
(New Zealand) Auckland City	0

Second round
9 December – Abu Dhabi
(United Arab Emirates) Al-Jazira	1
(Japan) Urawa Red Diamonds	0
9 December – Abu Dhabi
(Mexico) Pachuca (a.e.t.)	1
(Morocco) Wydad Casablanca	0

Semi-finals
13 December – Abu Dhabi
(United Arab Emirates) Al-Jazira	1
(Spain) Real Madrid	2
12 December – Al Ain
(Brazil) Grêmio (a.e.t.)	1
(Mexico) Pachuca	0
Match for fifth place
12 December – Al Ain
(Morocco) Wydad Casablanca	2
(Japan) Urawa Red Diamonds	3

Final
16 December – Abu Dhabi
(Spain) Real Madrid	1
(Brazil) Grêmio	0
Match for third place
16 December – Abu Dhabi
(United Arab Emirates) Al-Jazira	1
(Mexico) Pachuca	4

All times were local, GST (UTC+4).

=== First round ===
6 December 2017
21:00

Al-Jazira (United Arab Emirates)	1–0	(New Zealand) Auckland City
Romarinho 38'	Report; Archive Report

Hazza bin Zayed Stadium, Al Ain
Attendance: 4,246
Referee: Malang Diedhiou (Senegal)

=== Second round ===
9 December 2017
17:00

Pachuca (Mexico)	1–0 (a.e.t.)	(Morocco) Wydad Casablanca
Guzmán 112'	Report; Archive Report

Zayed Sports City Stadium, Abu Dhabi
Attendance: 12,488
Referee: Ravshan Irmatov (Uzbekistan)

9 December 2017
20:30

Al-Jazira (United Arab Emirates)	1–0	(Japan) Urawa Red Diamonds
Mabkhout 52'	Report; Archive Report

Zayed Sports City Stadium, Abu Dhabi
Attendance: 15,593
Referee: César Ramos (Mexico)

=== Match for fifth place ===
12 December 2017
18:00

Wydad Casablanca (Morocco)	2–3	(Japan) Urawa Red Diamonds
Haddad 21'; Hajhouj 90+4' (pen.)	Report; Archive Report	Maurício 18', 60'; Kashiwagi 26'

Hazza bin Zayed Stadium, Al Ain
Attendance: 4,281
Referee: Matt Conger (New Zealand)

=== Semi-finals ===
12 December 2017
21:00

Grêmio (Brazil)	1–0 (a.e.t.)	(Mexico) Pachuca
Everton 95'	Report; Archive Report

Hazza bin Zayed Stadium, Al Ain
Attendance: 6,428
Referee: Felix Brych (Germany)

13 December 2017
21:00

Al-Jazira (United Arab Emirates)	1–2	(Spain) Real Madrid
Romarinho 41'	Report; Archive Report	Ronaldo 53'; Bale 81'

Zayed Sports City Stadium, Abu Dhabi
Attendance: 36,650
Referee: Sandro Ricci (Brazil)

=== Match for third place ===
16 December 2017
18:00

Al-Jazira (United Arab Emirates)	1–4	(Mexico) Pachuca
Mubarak 57'	Report; Archive Report	Urretaviscaya 37'; Jara 60'; De la Rosa 79'; Sagal 84' (pen.)

Zayed Sports City Stadium, Abu Dhabi
Attendance: 11,785
Referee: Malang Diedhiou (Senegal)

=== Final ===
16 December 2017
21:00

Real Madrid (Spain)	1–0	(Brazil) Grêmio
Ronaldo 53'	Report

Zayed Sports City Stadium, Abu Dhabi
Attendance: 41,094
Referee: César Ramos (Mexico)

== Goalscorers ==
Rank	Player	Team	Goals
1	(Brazil) Maurício Antônio	(Japan) Urawa Red Diamonds	2
1	(Brazil) Romarinho	(United Arab Emirates) Al-Jazira	2
1	(Portugal) Cristiano Ronaldo	(Spain) Real Madrid	2
4	(Wales) Gareth Bale	(Spain) Real Madrid	1
4	(Mexico) Roberto de la Rosa	(Mexico) Pachuca	1
4	(Brazil) Éverton	(Brazil) Grêmio	1
4	(Mexico) Víctor Guzmán	(Mexico) Pachuca	1
4	(Morocco) Ismail El Haddad	(Morocco) Wydad Casablanca	1
4	(Morocco) Reda Hajhouj	(Morocco) Wydad Casablanca	1
4	(Argentina) Franco Jara	(Mexico) Pachuca	1
4	(Japan) Yōsuke Kashiwagi	(Japan) Urawa Red Diamonds	1
4	(United Arab Emirates) Ali Mabkhout	(United Arab Emirates) Al-Jazira	1
4	(United Arab Emirates) Khalfan Mubarak	(United Arab Emirates) Al-Jazira	1
4	(Chile) Ángelo Sagal	(Mexico) Pachuca	1
4	(Uruguay) Jonathan Urretaviscaya	(Mexico) Pachuca	1

Source: FIFA

== Awards ==
The following awards were given at the conclusion of the tournament.

Adidas Golden Ball Alibaba Cloud Award	Adidas Silver Ball	Adidas Bronze Ball
(Croatia) Luka Modrić (Real Madrid)	(Portugal) Cristiano Ronaldo (Real Madrid)	(Uruguay) Jonathan Urretaviscaya (Pachuca)
FIFA Fair Play Award
(Spain) Real Madrid

FIFA also named a man of the match for the best player in each game at the tournament.

Alibaba Cloud Match Award
Match	Man of the match	Club	Opponent
1	(United Arab Emirates) Ali Khasif	(United Arab Emirates) Al-Jazira	(New Zealand) Auckland City
2	(Uruguay) Jonathan Urretaviscaya	(Mexico) Pachuca	(Morocco) Wydad Casablanca
3	(United Arab Emirates) Ali Mabkhout	(United Arab Emirates) Al-Jazira	(Japan) Urawa Red Diamonds
4	(Japan) Yōsuke Kashiwagi	(Japan) Urawa Red Diamonds	(Morocco) Wydad Casablanca
5	(Brazil) Everton	(Brazil) Grêmio	(Mexico) Pachuca
6	(Croatia) Luka Modrić	(Spain) Real Madrid	(United Arab Emirates) Al-Jazira
7	(Uruguay) Jonathan Urretaviscaya (2)	(Mexico) Pachuca	(United Arab Emirates) Al-Jazira
8	(Portugal) Cristiano Ronaldo	(Spain) Real Madrid	(Brazil) Grêmio

== Broadcasting rights ==
- Brazil: Rede Globo, SporTV and Fox Sports
- China: CCTV-5, PPTV and Youku
- Europe: EBU
- Hispanic America: Fox Sports
- Hong Kong: i-Cable and Fantastic TV
- India: Neo Prime and Neo Sports
- Japan: Nippon TV
- Middle East: beIN Sports
- Spain: La 1
- United States: Fox Sports and Telemundo
