= 2016 FIFA Club World Cup final =

- Match program me
- Event: 2016 FIFA Club World Cup
Real Madrid	Kashima Antlers
(Spain)	(Japan)
4	2
- After extra time
- Date: 18 December 2016
- Venue: International Stadium Yokohama, Yokohama
- Man of the Match: Cristiano Ronaldo (Real Madrid)
- Referee: Janny Sikazwe (Zambia)
- Attendance: 68,742
- Weather: Partly cloudy 10 °C (50 °F); 82% humidity

The 2016 FIFA Club World Cup final was the final match of the 2016 FIFA Club World Cup, an association football tournament hosted by Japan. It was the 13th final of the FIFA Club World Cup, a FIFA-organised tournament between the winners of the six continental confederations, as well as the host nation's league champions.

The final was contested between Spanish club Real Madrid, representing UEFA as the reigning champions of the UEFA Champions League, and Japanese club Kashima Antlers, representing the host country as the reigning champions of the J1 League. It was the first time a team from Asia played in the final. The match was played at the International Stadium Yokohama in Yokohama on 18 December 2016.

Real Madrid won the match 4–2 after extra time to claim their 2nd title.

== Background ==
Kashima Antlers became the first Asian club to reach the FIFA Club World Cup final. It was also the first time that an Asian club won against a South American side in the history of the competition, and the third time that South American champions failed to qualify for the final, after the 2010 and 2013 editions.

For Real Madrid, the match was their second final, after having won the 2014 final. This was the 12th time in 13 tournaments in which a European team made it to the final.

== Route to the final ==
(Spain) Real Madrid		Team	(Japan) Kashima Antlers	
UEFA		Confederation	AFC (host)	
Winners of the 2015–16 UEFA Champions League		Qualification	Winners of the 2016 J1 League	
Opponent	Result	2016 FIFA Club World Cup	Opponent	Result
Bye		First round	(New Zealand) Auckland City	2–1
Bye		Second round	(South Africa) Mamelodi Sundowns	2–0
(Mexico) América	2–0	Semi-finals	(Colombia) Atlético Nacional	3–0

=== Real Madrid ===
Real Madrid entered the competition in the semi-finals, facing Mexican side and CONCACAF Champions League winners América. Karim Benzema opened the scoring for Real in first half stoppage time, putting them ahead at the break. Cristiano Ronaldo secured the 2–0 victory and final spot for Los Blancos with a goal in second half stoppage time.

=== Kashima Antlers ===
Kashima Antlers started the tournament in the quarter-final play-off, facing New Zealand side Auckland City, winners of the OFC Champions League. Auckland opened the scoring via a goal from Kim Dae-wook in the 50th minute. Seventeen minutes later, Shuhei Akasaki equalised for the hosts. With two minutes remaining, Mu Kanazaki grabbed the late winner, sending Kashima through to the quarter-finals with a 2–1 win.

In the quarter-finals, the Antlers faced the CAF Champions League winners and South African champions Mamelodi Sundowns. Yasushi Endo opened the scoring in the 63rd minute to put Kashima ahead, before Shuhei Akasaki once again scored with two minutes remaining to secure the 2–0 win and semi-final spot.

In the semi-finals, Kashima met the Copa Libertadores winners, Atlético Nacional of Colombia. In the 33rd minute, Hungarian referee Viktor Kassai awarded a historic penalty to Kashima. This was the first time that the video assistant referee (VAR) system was used to award a penalty in football, following a video replay review by Kassai. The review was initiated after Kassai received information from Dutchman Danny Makkelie about a missed incident in Atlético Nacional's penalty box. Shoma Doi then successfully converted the penalty to put Kashima ahead at the interval. Yasushi Endo extended their lead in the 83rd minute, before Yuma Suzuki scored two minutes later, wrapping up the 3–0 win for Kashima and sending them through to the final.

== Match ==
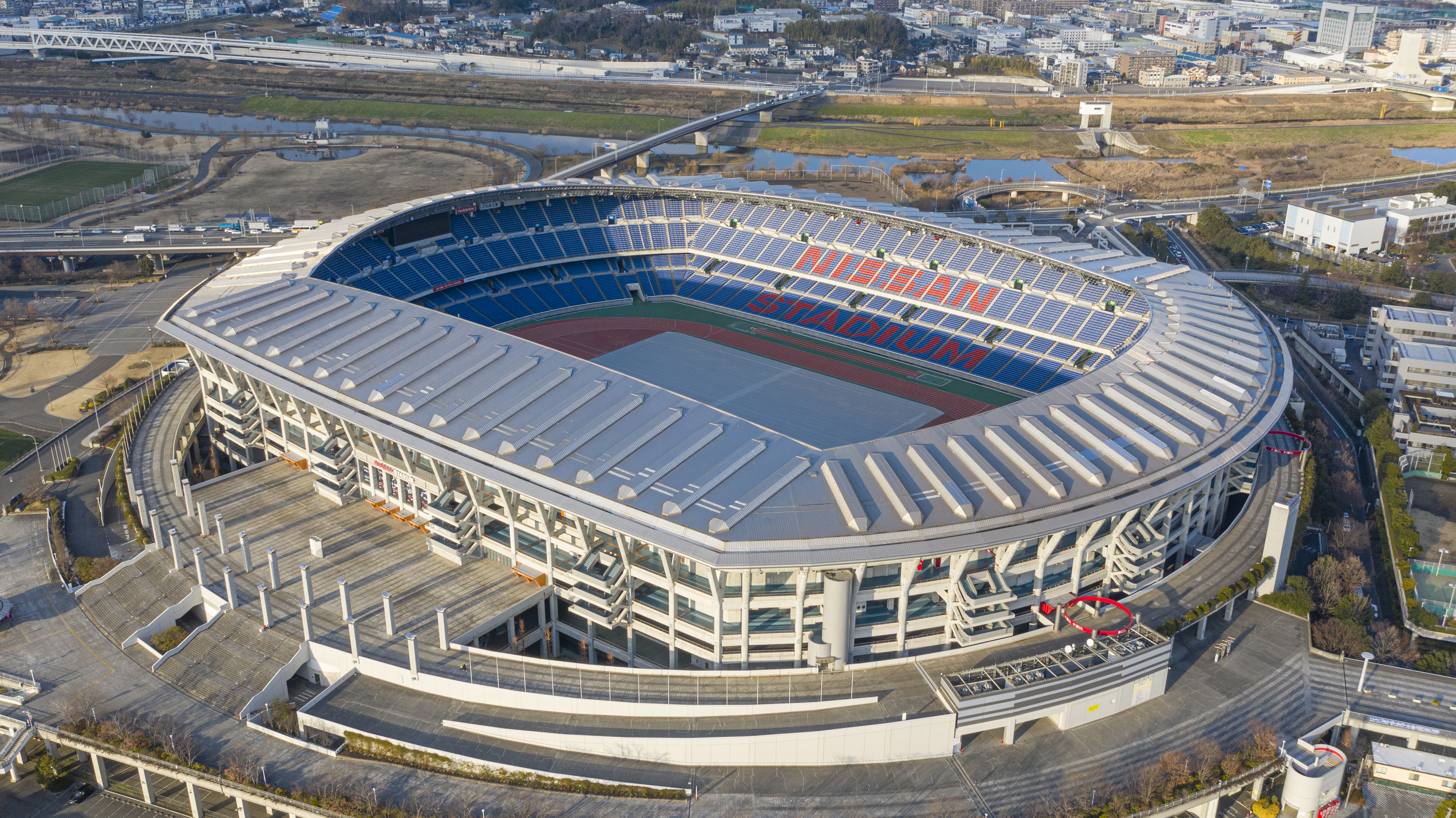
International Stadium Yokohama (also known as Nissan Stadium) in Yokohama, Japan, hosted the match.

=== Summary ===
Real Madrid centre-forward Karim Benzema opened the scoring in the ninth minute with a right foot shot from seven yards out after an initial shot from Luka Modrić was saved by Hitoshi Sogahata with the rebound coming straight back to Benzema. Gaku Shibasaki equalised for Kashima Antlers shortly before the interval with a low left footed shot from six yards out to the right corner of the net. In the 52nd minute, Shibasaki scored his second to put Kashima ahead with a low left foot shot from outside the penalty box that skimmed past Real goalkeeper Keylor Navas and into the left corner of the net. In the sixtieth minute, Antlers defender Shuto Yamamoto fouled Real forward Lucas Vázquez in the box, resulting in a penalty awarded to Madrid. Forward Cristiano Ronaldo converted the spot kick shooting low to his left to equalise for the European champions. Both sides had additional opportunities to score, but with no further goals in regulation, the match went to extra time.

In the 98th minute, Ronaldo scored his second goal of the match to put Real Madrid ahead once again with a low left-footed shot from inside the penalty box which went under the goalkeeper, following a through ball by Benzema. In the final minute of the first half of extra time, Ronaldo completed his hat-trick for Real Madrid with a left-footed shot from the center of the box into the roof of the net, following a pass from Toni Kroos. The hat-trick goal sealed the 4–2 win for Real, giving them their second Club World Cup title in three years.

=== Details ===
18 December 2016
19:30 JST

Real Madrid (Spain)	4–2 (a.e.t.)	(Japan) Kashima Antlers
Benzema 9'; Ronaldo 60' (pen.), 98', 104'	Report	Shibasaki 44', 52'

International Stadium Yokohama, Yokohama
Attendance: 68,742
Referee: Janny Sikazwe (Zambia)

Real Madrid	Kashima Antlers

GK	1	(Costa Rica) Keylor Navas
RB	2	(Spain) Dani Carvajal	(yellow card) 102'
CB	5	(France) Raphaël Varane
CB	4	(Spain) Sergio Ramos (c)	(yellow card) 55'	(substituted off) 108'
LB	12	(Brazil) Marcelo
CM	19	(Croatia) Luka Modrić		(substituted off) 106'
CM	14	(Brazil) Casemiro	(yellow card) 100'
CM	8	(Germany) Toni Kroos
RF	17	(Spain) Lucas Vázquez		(substituted off) 81'
CF	9	(France) Karim Benzema
LF	7	(Portugal) Cristiano Ronaldo		(substituted off) 112'
Substitutes:
GK	13	(Spain) Kiko Casilla
GK	25	(Spain) Rubén Yáñez
DF	3	(Portugal) Pepe
DF	6	(Spain) Nacho		(substituted on) 108'
DF	15	(Portugal) Fábio Coentrão
DF	23	(Brazil) Danilo
MF	10	(Colombia) James Rodríguez
MF	16	(Croatia) Mateo Kovačić		(substituted on) 106'
MF	20	(Spain) Marco Asensio
MF	22	(Spain) Isco		(substituted on) 81'
FW	18	(Dominican Republic) Mariano
FW	21	(Spain) Álvaro Morata		(substituted on) 112'
Manager:
(France) Zinedine Zidane

GK	21	(Japan) Hitoshi Sogahata
RB	22	(Japan) Daigo Nishi
CB	23	(Japan) Naomichi Ueda
CB	3	(Japan) Gen Shoji
LB	16	(Japan) Shuto Yamamoto	(yellow card) 58'
RM	25	(Japan) Yasushi Endo		(substituted off) 102'
CM	10	(Japan) Gaku Shibasaki
CM	40	(Japan) Mitsuo Ogasawara (c)		(substituted off) 67'
LM	6	(Japan) Ryota Nagaki		(substituted off) 114'
CF	33	(Japan) Mu Kanazaki
CF	8	(Japan) Shoma Doi		(substituted off) 88'
Substitutes:
GK	1	(Japan) Masatoshi Kushibiki
GK	29	(Japan) Shinichiro Kawamata
DF	14	(South Korea) Hwang Seok-ho
DF	17	(Brazil) Bueno
DF	24	(Japan) Yukitoshi Ito		(substituted on) 102'
MF	11	(Brazil) Fabrício	(yellow card) 93'	(substituted on) 67'
MF	13	(Japan) Atsutaka Nakamura
MF	20	(Japan) Kento Misao
MF	32	(Japan) Taro Sugimoto
MF	35	(Japan) Taiki Hirato
FW	18	(Japan) Shuhei Akasaki		(substituted on) 114'
FW	34	(Japan) Yuma Suzuki		(substituted on) 88'
Manager:
(Japan) Masatada Ishii

Man of the Match:
Cristiano Ronaldo (Real Madrid)

Assistant referees:
Marwa Range (Kenya)
Jerson dos Santos (Angola)
Fourth official:
Viktor Kassai (Hungary)
Fifth official:
György Ring (Hungary)
Video assistant referees:
Danny Makkelie (Netherlands)
Damir Skomina (Slovenia)
Bakary Gassama (Gambia)

Match rules

- 90 minutes.
- 30 minutes of extra time if necessary.
- Penalty shoot-out if scores still level.
- Twelve named substitutes.
- Maximum of three substitutions, with a fourth allowed in extra time.

=== Statistics ===
First half
Statistic	Real Madrid	Kashima Antlers
Goals scored	1	1
Total shots	11	4
Shots on target	4	1
Saves	0	3
Ball possession	55%	45%
Corner kicks	4	1
Fouls committed	6	6
Offsides	0	2
Yellow cards	0	0
Red cards	0	0

Second half
Statistic	Real Madrid	Kashima Antlers
Goals scored	1	1
Total shots	14	5
Shots on target	5	4
Saves	3	4
Ball possession	61%	39%
Corner kicks	9	3
Fouls committed	7	3
Offsides	1	1
Yellow cards	1	1
Red cards	0	0

Extra time
Statistic	Real Madrid	Kashima Antlers
Goals scored	2	0
Total shots	5	2
Shots on target	3	0
Saves	0	0
Ball possession	62%	38%
Corner kicks	1	2
Fouls committed	4	10
Offsides	1	1
Yellow cards	2	1
Red cards	0	0

Overall
Statistic	Real Madrid	Kashima Antlers
Goals scored	4	2
Total shots	30	11
Shots on target	12	5
Saves	3	7
Ball possession	59%	41%
Corner kicks	14	6
Fouls committed	17	19
Offsides	2	4
Yellow cards	3	2
Red cards	0	0

== Post-match ==
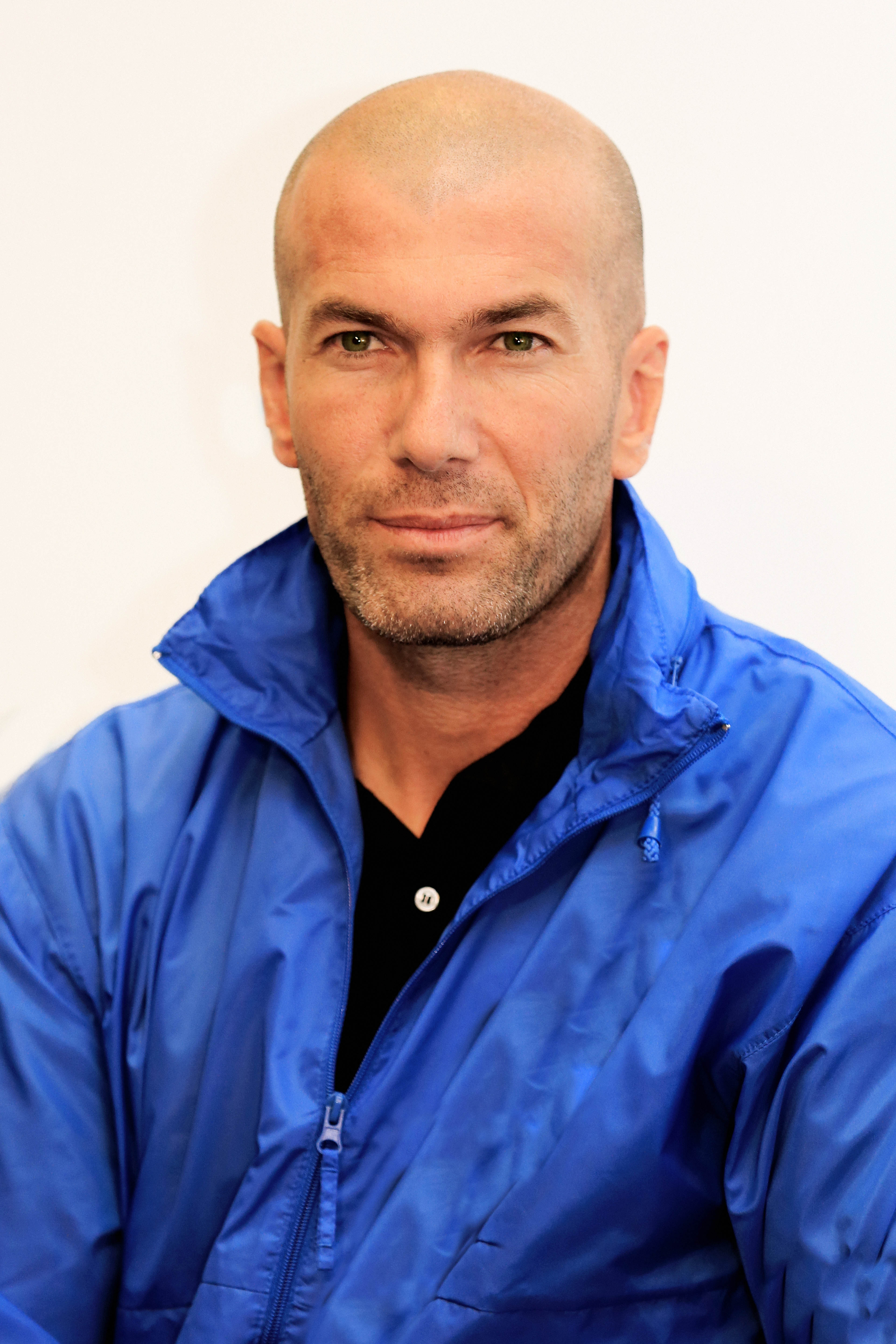
The victory gave Real Madrid manager Zinedine Zidane his third trophy in less than a year in charge

The win gave Real their second Club World title, after winning the 2014 edition. The title was Real's third of 2016, following victories in the 2015–16 UEFA Champions League and 2016 UEFA Super Cup. With his final hat-trick, Cristiano Ronaldo was named the man of the match. He also finished as the tournament's top scorer, with four goals. Additionally, he was awarded the adidas Golden Ball for best player of the tournament. Teammate Luka Modrić came in second, receiving the Silver Ball. Kashima midfielder Gaku Shibasaki came in third, and was given the Bronze Ball following his brace in the final. Kashima Antlers were also awarded the fair play award with the best fair play record during the tournament.

Following the match, Real manager Zinedine Zidane commented on the victory, saying: "We knew that this final would not be an easy one. They ran. They fought. I think there are several players from Kashima that could play in La Liga. The fact that we were able to be here and win, we're very happy. To be able to take the Club World Cup back home with us makes us very happy." Kashima manager Masatada Ishii stated that "For us to be able to come so far is meaningful. It really means that Japanese football, in a very short period of time, has come up to a world-class level."

== See also ==
- Real Madrid CF in international football competitions
