= Bakary Gassama =

Gambian football referee (born 1979)

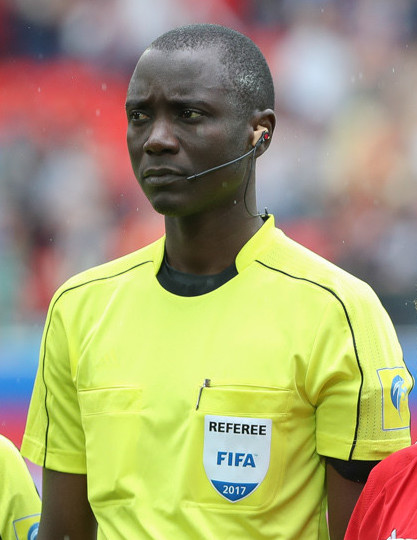
- Gassama at the 2017 Confederations Cup
- Full name: Bakary Papa Gassama
- Born: 10 February 1979 (age 47); The Gambia

International
Years	League	Role
2007–	FIFA listed	Referee

Bakary Papa Gassama (born 10 February 1979) is a Gambian football referee. He became a FIFA referee in 2007. He officiated at the 2012 Olympic tournament, in which he was the fourth official for the gold medal match between Mexico and Brazil. He also served as a referee at the 2012 and 2013 Africa Cup of Nations tournaments, as well as the 2014 FIFA World Cup qualifiers.

In March 2013, FIFA named Gassama as one of the fifty potential referees for the 2014 World Cup. On 15 January 2014, FIFA announced that he would be one of the 25 referees for the tournament. His assistants were announced to be Evarist Menkouandé and Felicien Kabanda. He officiated the third group stage match in group B between the Netherlands and Chile on 23 June 2014. He officiated the 2015 Africa Cup of Nations Final match on 8 February 2015 between Ghana and Côte d'Ivoire.

On 27 April 2017, Gassama was selected as CAF's sole referee for the 2017 FIFA Confederations Cup in Russia. His assistants were announced to be Jean Claude Birumushahu (Burundi) and Marwa Range (Kenya), and his video assistant referee was appointed to be Malang Diedhiou (Senegal). His only match at the competition was the Group A match between Mexico and New Zealand on 21 June 2017.

On 29 March 2018, FIFA announced that he had been selected to officiate some matches at 2018 FIFA World Cup along with Jean-Claude Birumushahu and Marwa Range as assistant referees.

FIFA announced that he had been selected to officiate some matches at 2022 FIFA World Cup Qatar.
