= 2016 FIFA Club World Cup =

FIFA Club World Cup Japan 2016 presented by Alibaba YunOS Auto Alibaba YunOS Auto プレゼンツ FIFAクラブワールドカップ ジャパン2016

Tournament details
- Host country: Japan
- Dates: 8–18 December
- Teams: 7 (from 6 confederations)
- Venues: 2 (in 2 host cities)

Final positions
- Champions: (Spain) Real Madrid (2nd title)
- Runners-up: (Japan) Kashima Antlers
- Third place: (Colombia) Atlético Nacional
- Fourth place: (Mexico) América

Tournament statistics
- Matches played: 8
- Goals scored: 28 (3.5 per match)
- Attendance: 238,428 (29,804 per match)
- Top scorer: (Portugal) Cristiano Ronaldo (4 goals)
- Best player: (Portugal) Cristiano Ronaldo
- Fair play award: (Japan) Kashima Antlers

The 2016 FIFA Club World Cup (officially known as the FIFA Club World Cup Japan 2016 presented by Alibaba YunOS Auto for sponsorship reasons) was the 13th edition of the FIFA Club World Cup, a FIFA-organised international club football tournament between the winners of the six continental confederations, as well as the host nation's league champions. The tournament was hosted by Japan.

This edition marked the second time and first since 2008 in which the CONMEBOL representative did not feature any clubs from Argentina or Brazil.

Barcelona could not defend their title as they were eliminated in the 2015–16 UEFA Champions League quarter-finals.

Real Madrid won their second Club World Cup, defeating hosts Kashima Antlers 4–2 after extra time in the final.

== Host bids ==
The application process for the 2015–16 as well as the 2017–18 editions, i.e. two hosts, each hosting two years, began in February 2014. Member associations interested in hosting had to submit a declaration of interest by 30 March 2014, and provide the complete set of bidding documents by 25 August 2014. The FIFA Executive Committee was to select the hosts at their meeting in Morocco in December 2014. However, no such decision regarding the 2015–2016 host was made until 2015.

The following countries expressed an interest in bidding to host the tournament:

- India (withdrew interest in November 2014)
- Japan

Japan was officially confirmed as hosts of the 2015 and 2016 tournaments on 23 April 2015.

== Qualified teams ==
Location of teams of the 2016 FIFA Club World Cup.

Team	Confederation	Qualification	Qualified date	Participation (bold indicates winners)
Entering in the semi-finals
(Colombia) Atlético Nacional	CONMEBOL	Winners of the 2016 Copa Libertadores	27 July 2016	Debut
(Spain) Real Madrid	UEFA	Winners of the 2015–16 UEFA Champions League	28 May 2016	3rd (Previous: 2000, **2014**)
Entering in the second round
(South Korea) Jeonbuk Hyundai Motors	AFC	Winners of the 2016 AFC Champions League	26 November 2016	2nd (Previous: 2006)
(South Africa) Mamelodi Sundowns	CAF	Winners of the 2016 CAF Champions League	23 October 2016	Debut
(Mexico) América	CONCACAF	Winners of the 2015–16 CONCACAF Champions League	27 April 2016	3rd (Previous: 2006, 2015)
Entering in the first round
(New Zealand) Auckland City	OFC	Winners of the 2016 OFC Champions League	23 April 2016	8th (Previous: 2006, 2009, 2011, 2012, 2013, 2014, 2015)
(Japan) Kashima Antlers	AFC (host)	Winners of the 2016 J1 League	3 December 2016	Debut

== Venues ==
On 9 June 2016, Suita City Football Stadium in Osaka and International Stadium Yokohama in Yokohama were named as the two venues of the tournament.

Osaka	2016 FIFA Club World Cup is located in Japan	Yokohama
Suita City Football Stadium	2016 FIFA Club World Cup is located in Japan	International Stadium Yokohama
34°48′41.04″N 135°32′27.24″E	2016 FIFA Club World Cup is located in Japan	35°30′35″N 139°36′20″E
Capacity: 39,694	2016 FIFA Club World Cup is located in Japan	Capacity: 72,327

== Match officials ==
The appointed match officials were:

Confederation	Referee	Assistant referees	Video assistant referee
AFC	(Bahrain) Nawaf Shukralla	(Bahrain) Yaser Tulefat (Qatar) Taleb Al Marri	(Uzbekistan) Ravshan Irmatov
CAF	(Zambia) Janny Sikazwe	(Angola) Jerson dos Santos (Kenya) Marwa Range	(The Gambia) Bakary Gassama
CONCACAF	(Mexico) Roberto García	(Mexico) José Camargo (Mexico) Alberto Morín	(United States) Mark Geiger
CONMEBOL	(Paraguay) Enrique Cáceres	(Paraguay) Eduardo Cardozo (Paraguay) Juan Zorrilla	(Uruguay) Andrés Cunha
OFC	(French Polynesia) Abdelkader Zitouni	(French Polynesia) Philippe Revel	(New Zealand) Nick Waldron
UEFA	(Hungary) Viktor Kassai	(Hungary) György Ring (Hungary) Vencel Tóth	(Slovenia) Damir Skomina (Netherlands) Danny Makkelie

Video assistant referees were tested during the tournament. The system was used for the first time when a penalty was awarded by referee Viktor Kassai in the first half of the semi-final between Atlético Nacional and Kashima Antlers after a review of video replay.

== Squads ==
Each team had to name a 23-man squad (three of whom must be goalkeepers). Injury replacements were allowed until 24 hours before the team's first match. The official squads (excluding the host team, who was yet to be determined) were announced on 1 December 2016.

== Matches ==
The schedule of the tournament was announced on 15 July 2016.

A draw was held on 21 September 2016, 11:00 CEST (UTC+2), at the FIFA headquarters in Zürich, Switzerland, to determine the positions in the bracket for the three teams which enter the second round.

If a match was tied after normal playing time:

- For elimination matches, extra time would be played. If still tied after extra time, a penalty shoot-out would be held to determine the winner.
- For the matches for fifth place and third place, no extra time would be played, and a penalty shoot-out would be held to determine the winner.

On 18 March 2016, the FIFA Executive Committee agreed that the competition would be part of the International Football Association Board's trial to allow a fourth substitute to be made during extra time.

First round
8 December – Yokohama
(Japan) Kashima Antlers	2
(New Zealand) Auckland City	1

Second round
11 December – Osaka
(South Korea) Jeonbuk Hyundai Motors	1
(Mexico) América	2
11 December – Osaka
(South Africa) Mamelodi Sundowns	0
(Japan) Kashima Antlers	2

Semi-finals
15 December – Yokohama
(Mexico) América	0
(Spain) Real Madrid	2
14 December – Osaka
(Colombia) Atlético Nacional	0
(Japan) Kashima Antlers	3
Match for fifth place
14 December – Osaka
(South Korea) Jeonbuk Hyundai Motors	4
(South Africa) Mamelodi Sundowns	1

Final
18 December – Yokohama
(Spain) Real Madrid (a.e.t.)	4
(Japan) Kashima Antlers	2
Match for third place
18 December – Yokohama
(Mexico) América	2 (3)
(Colombia) Atlético Nacional (p)	2 (4)

All times are local, JST (UTC+9).

=== First round ===
8 December 2016
19:30

Kashima Antlers (Japan)	2–1	(New Zealand) Auckland City
Akasaki 67'; Kanazaki 88'	Report	Kim Dae-wook 50'

International Stadium Yokohama, Yokohama
Attendance: 17,667
Referee: Janny Sikazwe (Zambia)

=== Second round ===
11 December 2016
16:00

Jeonbuk Hyundai Motors (South Korea)	1–2	(Mexico) América
Kim Bo-kyung 23'	Report	Romero 58', 74'

Suita City Football Stadium, Osaka
Attendance: 14,587
Referee: Viktor Kassai (Hungary)

11 December 2016
19:30

Mamelodi Sundowns (South Africa)	0–2	(Japan) Kashima Antlers
	Report	Endo 63'; Kanazaki 88'

Suita City Football Stadium, Osaka
Attendance: 21,702
Referee: Roberto García (Mexico)

=== Match for fifth place ===
14 December 2016
16:30

Jeonbuk Hyundai Motors (South Korea)	4–1	(South Africa) Mamelodi Sundowns
Kim Bo-kyung 18'; Lee Jong-ho 29'; Nascimento 41' (o.g.); Kim Shin-wook 89'	Report	Tau 48'

Suita City Football Stadium, Osaka
Attendance: 5,938
Referee: Nawaf Shukralla (Bahrain)

=== Semi-finals ===
14 December 2016
19:30

Atlético Nacional (Colombia)	0–3	(Japan) Kashima Antlers
	Report	Doi 33' (pen.); Endo 83'; Suzuki 85'

Suita City Football Stadium, Osaka
Attendance: 15,050
Referee: Viktor Kassai (Hungary)

15 December 2016
19:30

América (Mexico)	0–2	(Spain) Real Madrid
	Report	Benzema 45+2'; Ronaldo 90+3'

International Stadium Yokohama, Yokohama
Attendance: 50,117
Referee: Enrique Cáceres (Paraguay)

=== Match for third place ===
18 December 2016
16:00

América (Mexico)	2–2	(Colombia) Atlético Nacional
Arroyo 38'; Peralta 66' (pen.)	Report	Samudio 6' (o.g.); Guerra 26'
Penalties
Martínez (penalty missed); Samudio (penalty missed); Quintero (penalty scored); Peralta (penalty scored); Arroyo (penalty scored)	3–4	(penalty scored) Mosquera; (penalty missed) Nieto; (penalty scored) Bocanegra; (penalty scored) Torres; (penalty scored) Borja

International Stadium Yokohama, Yokohama
Attendance: 44,625
Referee: Nawaf Shukralla (Bahrain)

=== Final ===
18 December 2016
19:30

Real Madrid (Spain)	4–2 (a.e.t.)	(Japan) Kashima Antlers
Benzema 9'; Ronaldo 60' (pen.), 98', 104'	Report	Shibasaki 44', 52'

International Stadium Yokohama, Yokohama
Attendance: 68,742
Referee: Janny Sikazwe (Zambia)

== Goalscorers ==
Rank	Player	Team	Goals
1	(Portugal) Cristiano Ronaldo	(Spain) Real Madrid	4
2	(Argentina) Silvio Romero	(Mexico) América	2
2	(South Korea) Kim Bo-kyung	(South Korea) Jeonbuk Hyundai Motors	2
2	(Japan) Yasushi Endo	(Japan) Kashima Antlers	2
2	(Japan) Mu Kanazaki	(Japan) Kashima Antlers	2
2	(Japan) Gaku Shibasaki	(Japan) Kashima Antlers	2
2	(France) Karim Benzema	(Spain) Real Madrid	2
8	(Ecuador) Michael Arroyo	(Mexico) América	1
8	(Mexico) Oribe Peralta	(Mexico) América	1
8	(Venezuela) Alejandro Guerra	(Colombia) Atlético Nacional	1
8	(South Korea) Kim Dae-wook	(New Zealand) Auckland City	1
8	(South Korea) Kim Shin-wook	(South Korea) Jeonbuk Hyundai Motors	1
8	(South Korea) Lee Jong-ho	(South Korea) Jeonbuk Hyundai Motors	1
8	(Japan) Shuhei Akasaki	(Japan) Kashima Antlers	1
8	(Japan) Shoma Doi	(Japan) Kashima Antlers	1
8	(Japan) Yuma Suzuki	(Japan) Kashima Antlers	1
8	(South Africa) Percy Tau	(South Africa) Mamelodi Sundowns	1

1 own goal

- (Brazil) Ricardo Nascimento (Mamelodi Sundowns, against Jeonbuk Hyundai Motors)
- (Paraguay) Miguel Samudio (América, against Atlético Nacional)

== Awards ==
The following awards were given at the conclusion of the tournament.

Adidas Golden Ball Alibaba YunOS Auto Award	Adidas Silver Ball	Adidas Bronze Ball
(Portugal) Cristiano Ronaldo (Real Madrid)	(Croatia) Luka Modrić (Real Madrid)	(Japan) Gaku Shibasaki (Kashima Antlers)
FIFA Fair Play Award
(Japan) Kashima Antlers

FIFA also named a man of the match for the best player in each game at the tournament.

Alibaba YunOS Auto Match Award
Match	Man of the match	Club	Opponent
1	(Japan) Ryota Nagaki	(Japan) Kashima Antlers	(New Zealand) Auckland City
2	(Argentina) Silvio Romero	(Mexico) América	(South Korea) Jeonbuk Hyundai Motors
3	(Japan) Mu Kanazaki	(Japan) Kashima Antlers	(South Africa) Mamelodi Sundowns
4	(South Korea) Lee Jae-sung	(South Korea) Jeonbuk Hyundai Motors	(South Africa) Mamelodi Sundowns
5	(Japan) Hitoshi Sogahata	(Japan) Kashima Antlers	(Colombia) Atlético Nacional
6	(Croatia) Luka Modrić	(Spain) Real Madrid	(Mexico) América
7	(Colombia) Orlando Berrío	(Colombia) Atlético Nacional	(Mexico) América
8	(Portugal) Cristiano Ronaldo	(Spain) Real Madrid	(Japan) Kashima Antlers
