= 2014 FIFA Club World Cup final =

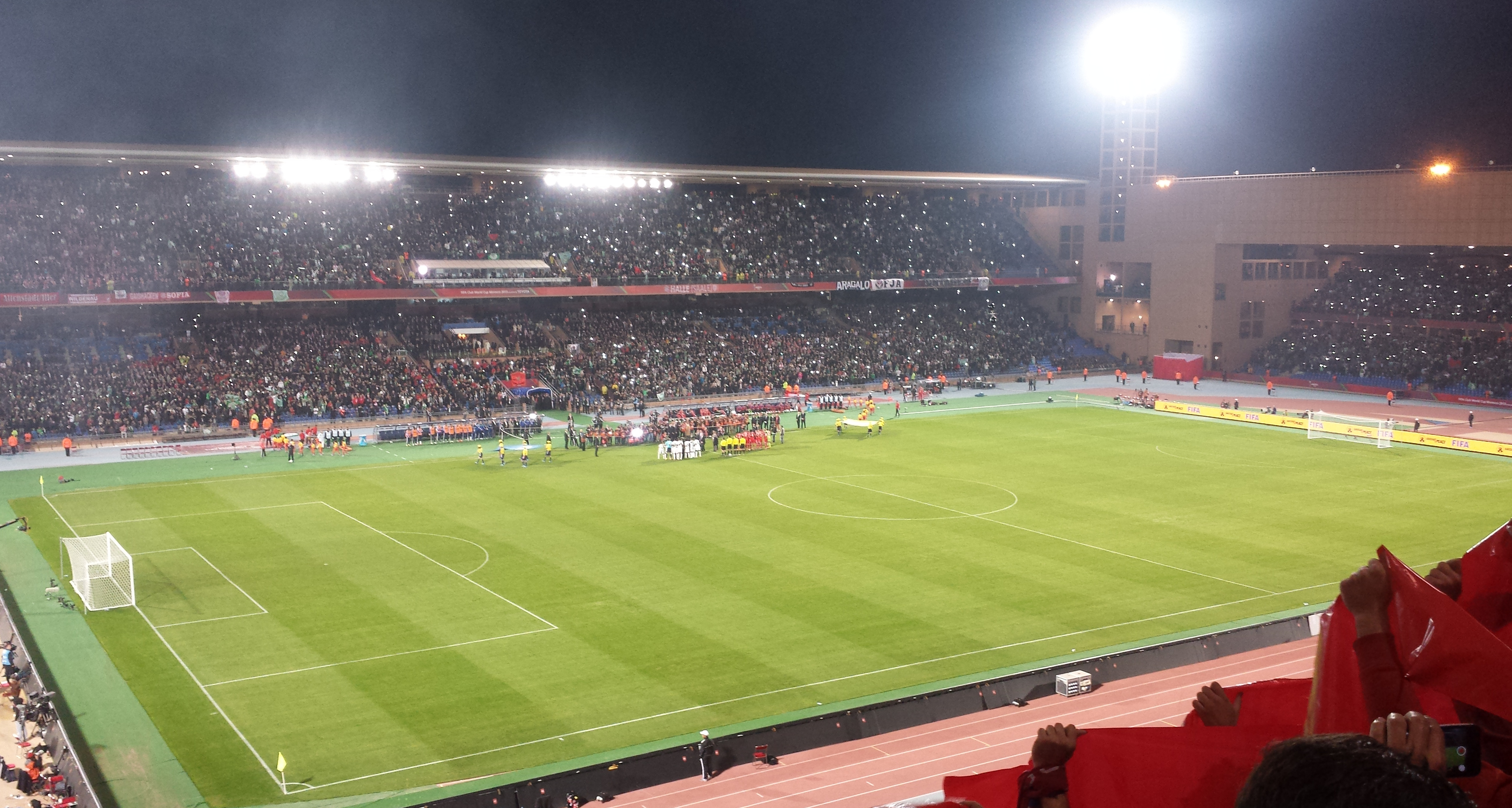
- The Stade de Marrakech staged the final
- Event: 2014 FIFA Club World Cup
Real Madrid	San Lorenzo
(Spain)	(Argentina)
2	0
- Date: 20 December 2014
- Venue: Stade de Marrakech, Marrakesh
- Man of the Match: Sergio Ramos (Real Madrid)
- Referee: Walter López (Guatemala)
- Attendance: 38,345
- Weather: Clear night 18 °C (64 °F); 59% humidity

The 2014 FIFA Club World Cup final was the final match of the 2014 FIFA Club World Cup, a football tournament hosted by Morocco. It was the 11th final of the FIFA Club World Cup, a tournament organised by FIFA between the winners of the six continental confederations, as well as the host nation's league champions.

The final was contested between Spanish club Real Madrid, representing UEFA as the reigning champions of the UEFA Champions League, and Argentine club San Lorenzo, representing CONMEBOL as the reigning champions of the Copa Libertadores. It was played at the Stade de Marrakech in Marrakesh on 20 December 2014. The Spanish club won the match 2–0 and won their first FIFA Club World Cup title, and their fourth world club title counting the 1960, 1998 and 2002 Intercontinental Cups, equalling Milan's record.

== Background ==
=== Real Madrid ===
Real Madrid qualified for the tournament as winners of the 2013–14 UEFA Champions League, following a 4–1 extra time win against Atlético Madrid in the final. This was Real Madrid's second time competing in the tournament, after finishing fourth in the inaugural tournament in 2000. They have played five times in the Intercontinental Cup, the predecessor of the FIFA Club World Cup, with three wins (1960, 1998, 2002) and two losses (1966, 2000). They reached the final after defeating Mexican club Cruz Azul in the semi-finals.

=== San Lorenzo ===
San Lorenzo qualified for the tournament as winners of the 2014 Copa Libertadores, following a 2–1 aggregate win against Nacional in the final. This was San Lorenzo's first time competing in the tournament. They reached the final after defeating New Zealand club Auckland City in the semi-finals.

== Route to the final ==
(Spain) Real Madrid	Team	(Argentina) San Lorenzo
UEFA	Confederation	CONMEBOL
Winners of the 2013–14 UEFA Champions League	Qualification	Winners of the 2014 Copa Libertadores
Bye	Play-off round	Bye
Bye	Quarter-finals	Bye
4–0 (Mexico) Cruz Azul (Ramos 15', Benzema 36', Bale 50', Isco 72')	Semi-finals	2–1 (a.e.t.) (New Zealand) Auckland City (Barrientos 45+2', Matos 93')

== Match details ==
20 December 2014
19:30 UTC±0

Real Madrid (Spain)	2–0	(Argentina) San Lorenzo
Ramos 37'; Bale 51'	Report

Stade de Marrakech, Marrakesh
Attendance: 38,345
Referee: Walter López (Guatemala)

Real Madrid	San Lorenzo

GK	1	(Spain) Iker Casillas (c)
RB	15	(Spain) Dani Carvajal	(yellow card) 30'	(substituted off) 73'
CB	4	(Spain) Sergio Ramos	(yellow card) 22'	(substituted off) 89'
CB	3	(Portugal) Pepe
LB	12	(Brazil) Marcelo		(substituted off) 44'
CM	23	(Spain) Isco
CM	8	(Germany) Toni Kroos
RM	11	(Wales) Gareth Bale
LM	10	(Colombia) James Rodríguez
CF	7	(Portugal) Cristiano Ronaldo
CF	9	(France) Karim Benzema
Substitutes:
GK	13	(Costa Rica) Keylor Navas
GK	25	(Spain) Fernando Pacheco
DF	2	(France) Raphaël Varane		(substituted on) 89'
DF	5	(Portugal) Fábio Coentrão		(substituted on) 44'
MF	6	(Germany) Sami Khedira
FW	14	(Mexico) Javier Hernández
DF	17	(Spain) Álvaro Arbeloa		(substituted on) 73'
DF	18	(Spain) Nacho
FW	20	(Spain) Jesé
MF	24	(Spain) Asier Illarramendi
MF	26	(Spain) Álvaro Medrán
Manager:
(Italy) Carlo Ancelotti

GK	12	(Argentina) Sebastián Torrico
RB	7	(Argentina) Julio Buffarini	(yellow card) 55'
CB	14	(Argentina) Walter Kannemann	(yellow card) 85'
CB	3	(Colombia) Mario Yepes		(substituted off) 61'
LB	21	(Argentina) Emmanuel Más
DM	20	(Paraguay) Néstor Ortigoza	(yellow card) 12'
DM	5	(Argentina) Juan Mercier (c)
CM	8	(Argentina) Enzo Kalinski
RM	30	(Argentina) Gonzalo Verón		(substituted off) 57'
LM	11	(Argentina) Pablo Barrientos	(yellow card) 16'
CF	9	(Uruguay) Martín Cauteruccio		(substituted off) 68'
Substitutes:
GK	1	(Argentina) Leo Franco
GK	33	(Argentina) José Devecchi
DF	2	(Argentina) Mauro Cetto		(substituted on) 61'
MF	10	(Argentina) Leandro Romagnoli		(substituted on) 57'
DF	13	(Argentina) Ramiro Arias
FW	15	(Argentina) Héctor Villalba
FW	22	(Argentina) Nicolás Blandi
MF	24	(Argentina) Juan Cavallaro
FW	26	(Argentina) Mauro Matos		(substituted on) 68'
DF	27	(Argentina) Matías Catalán
DF	29	(Argentina) Fabricio Fontanini
MF	31	(Argentina) Facundo Quignon
Manager:
(Argentina) Edgardo Bauza

Man of the Match:
Sergio Ramos (Real Madrid)

Assistant referees:
Leonel Leal (Costa Rica)
Gerson López (Guatemala)
Fourth official:
Noumandiez Doué (Ivory Coast)
Fifth official:
Songuifolo Yéo (Ivory Coast)

Match rules

- 90 minutes
- 30 minutes of extra time if necessary
- Penalty shoot-out if scores still level
- Twelve named substitutes, of which three may be used

== See also ==
- Real Madrid CF in international football competitions
