= List of FIFA Club World Cup finals =

- Founded: 2000
- Region: International (FIFA)
- Teams: 7
- Current champions: (England) Chelsea (2nd title)
- Most championships: (Spain) Real Madrid (5 titles)

The FIFA Club World Cup is an international association football competition organised by the FIFA, the sport's global governing body. It is the replacement or continuation of the Intercontinental Cup. The championship was first contested as the FIFA Club World Championship in 2000. It was not held between 2001 and 2004 due to a combination of factors, most importantly the collapse of FIFA's marketing partner International Sport and Leisure. Following a change in format which saw the FIFA Club World Championship absorb the Intercontinental Cup, it was relaunched in 2005, and took its current name the season afterwards.

The current format of the tournament, in use since the competition was revamped ahead of the 2025 edition, features 32 teams competing for the title at venues within the host nation; 12 teams from Europe, 6 from South America, 4 from Asia, 4 from Africa, 4 from North, Central America and Caribbean, 1 from Oceania, and 1 team from the host nation. The teams are drawn into eight groups of four, with each team playing three group stage matches in a round-robin format. The top two teams from each group advance to the knockout stage, starting with the round of 16 and culminating with the final.

Real Madrid holds the record for most victories, winning the competition five times since its inception. Teams from Spain have won the tournament the most times, with eight wins produced from that nation. The Union of European Football Associations (UEFA) is the most successful confederation of the competition, with sixteen titles earned by nine of its clubs.

The current champions are Chelsea, who won their second title following a 3–0 win against Paris Saint-Germain in the 2025 final, held at the MetLife Stadium in East Rutherford, New Jersey.

== History ==
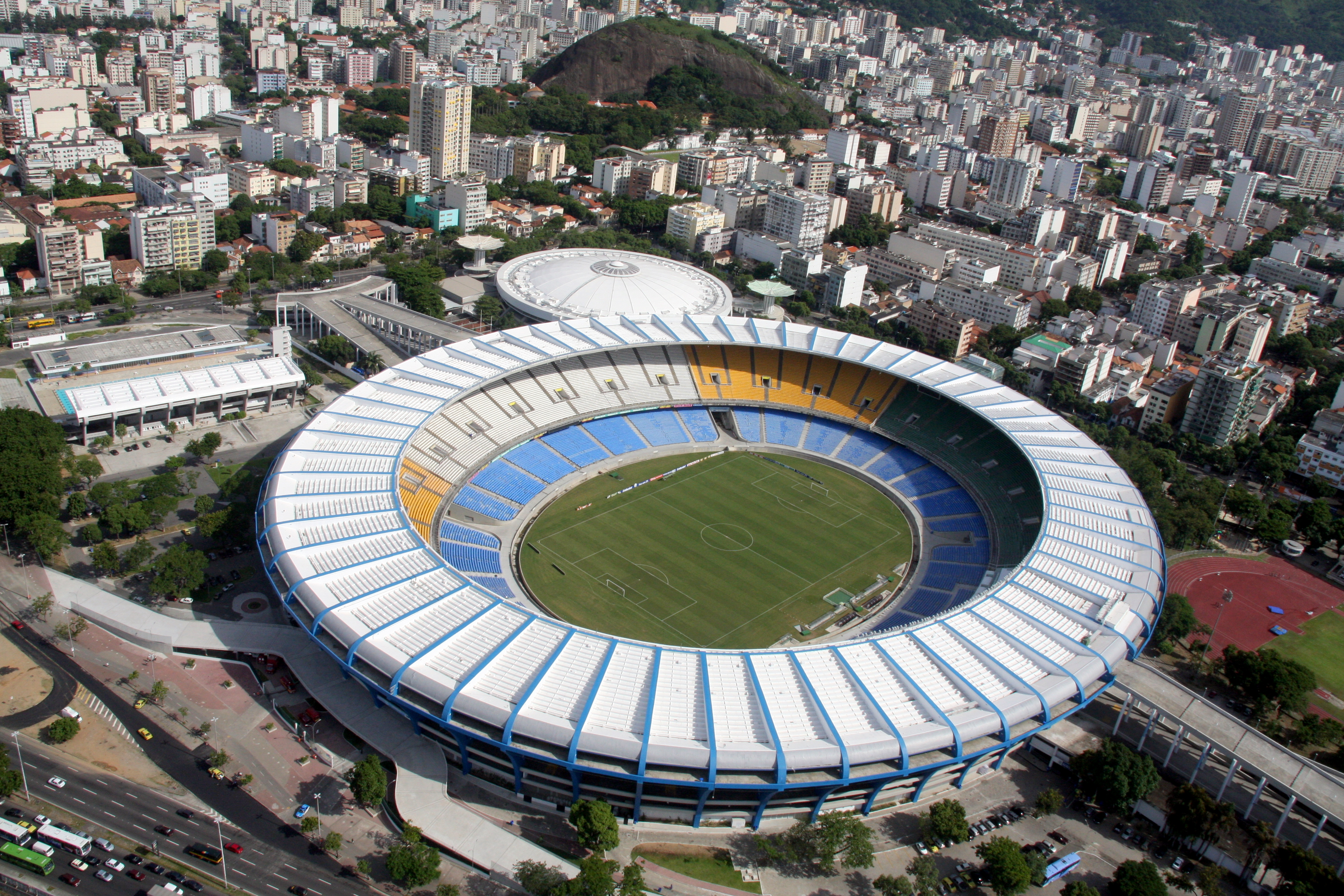
Estádio do Maracanã in Rio de Janeiro, Brazil, the location of the first Club World Cup final in 2000.

The first final of the competition was an all-Brazilian affair, as well as the only one which saw one side have home advantage. Vasco da Gama could not take advantage of its local support, being beaten by Corinthians 4–3 on penalties after a 0–0 draw in extra time. The second edition of the competition was planned for Spain in 2001, and was supposed to feature twelve clubs. However, it was canceled on 18 May, due to a combination of factors, most importantly the collapse of FIFA's marketing partner International Sport and Leisure. FIFA agreed with Toyota to merge the Toyota Cup and Club World Championship into one event.

The 2005 edition saw Brazilian club São Paulo pushed to the limit by Saudi side Al-Ittihad to reach the final. In the final, one goal from Mineiro was enough to dispatch English club Liverpool; Mineiro became the first player to score in a Club World Cup final. Internacional defeated defending world and South American champions São Paulo in the 2006 Copa Libertadores Finals in order to qualify for the 2006 tournament. In the semi-finals, Internacional beat Egyptian side Al Ahly, qualifying for the final against Barcelona from Spain. One late goal from Adriano Gabiru allowed the trophy to be kept in Brazil once again.

It was in 2007 when Brazilian hegemony was finally broken; Italian side Milan disputed a close match against Japan's Urawa Red Diamonds, who were pushed by over 67,000 fans at Yokohama's International Stadium, and won 1–0 to reach the final. In the final, Milan defeated Argentine side Boca Juniors 4–2, in a match that saw the first player to be sent off in a Club World Cup final, Milan's Kakha Kaladze from Georgia, in the 77th minute. Eleven minutes later, Boca Juniors' Pablo Ledesma would join Kaladze as he too was sent off. The following year, Manchester United would emulate Milan by beating their semi-final opponents, Japan's Gamba Osaka, 5–3. They saw off Ecuadorian club LDU Quito 1–0 in the final, as the English side became the second European team to win the tournament.

Barcelona dethroned world and European champions Manchester United in the 2009 UEFA Champions League Final to qualify for the 2009 edition of the Club World Cup. Barcelona defeated Mexican club Atlante 3–1 in the semi-finals and met Estudiantes from Argentina in the final. After a very close encounter which saw the need for extra time, Lionel Messi scored from a header to snatch victory for Barcelona and complete an unprecedented sextuple (six trophies in a calendar year). The 2010 edition saw the first non-European and non-South American side to reach the final: Congo's Mazembe defeated Brazil's Internacional 2–0 in the semi-finals to set up a final with Italian Internazionale, who had beaten South Korean club Seongnam Ilhwa Chunma 3–0. Internazionale would go on to beat Mazembe by the same scoreline to win their fifth title of the year.

In 2011, Barcelona would once again show its class after winning their semi-final match 4–0 against Qatari club Al-Sadd. In the final, Barcelona would win by the same scoreline against Brazilian side Santos; this is, to date, the largest final winning margin by any victor of the competition. The 2012 edition saw Europe's dominance come to an end, as Corinthians traveled to Japan to join Barcelona in becoming two-time winners of the competition. In the semi-finals, Al Ahly managed to keep the scoreline close as Corinthians' Paolo Guerrero scored to send the Timão into their second final. Guerrero would once again come through for Corinthians in the final as the Timão saw off English side Chelsea 1–0 in order to bring the trophy back to Brazil.

== List of finals ==
The International Stadium Yokohama in Japan has played host to the FIFA Club World Cup final the most times, with eight title-deciding matches held. Along with the Estádio do Maracanã, they are the only venues in the world to have hosted both the FIFA World Cup final and the FIFA Club World Cup final (International Stadium Yokohama hosted the 2002 FIFA World Cup final while the deciding match of the 1950 FIFA World Cup was disputed at the Maracanã). The 2000 FIFA Club World Championship final remains the highest attended final of the competition, with 73,000 fans attending the all-Brazilian match. The final was also the only one which saw two clubs from the same nation dispute it. The 2021 final had the fewest spectators, with 32,871 (not including the 2020 final, which had restricted seating due to the COVID-19 pandemic).

The 2007 final holds the record for most goals scored in regulation in a Club World Cup final, with six goals scored by five players, while the 2000 final remains the only scoreless decider. The 2011 final became the most lopsided match of the competition, with the triumphant team winning by a difference of four goals, a feat matched by the 2023 final twelve years later.

Key to the table
†	Match was won after extra time
‡	Match was won via a penalty shoot-out

Finals
Season	Champions		Score	Runners-up		Final venue	Host nation	Attendance	Ref(s)
Season	Country	Club	Score	Club	Country	Final venue	Host nation	Attendance	Ref(s)
2000	Brazil	Corinthians	0–0^{‡} (Note: Score was 0–0 after 120 minutes. Corinthians won 4–3 on penalties.)	Vasco da Gama	Brazil	Estádio do Maracanã, Rio de Janeiro	Brazil	73,000	
2005	Brazil	São Paulo	1–0	Liverpool	England	International Stadium Yokohama, Yokohama	Japan	66,821	
2006	Brazil	Internacional	1–0	Barcelona	Spain	International Stadium Yokohama, Yokohama	Japan	67,128	
2007	Italy	Milan	4–2	Boca Juniors	Argentina	International Stadium Yokohama, Yokohama	Japan	68,263	
2008	England	Manchester United	1–0	LDU Quito	Ecuador	International Stadium Yokohama, Yokohama	Japan	68,682	
2009	Spain	Barcelona	2–1^{†} (Note: Score was 1–1 after 90 minutes.)	Estudiantes	Argentina	Zayed Sports City Stadium, Abu Dhabi	United Arab Emirates	43,050	
2010	Italy	Internazionale	3–0	TP Mazembe	DR Congo	Zayed Sports City Stadium, Abu Dhabi	United Arab Emirates	42,174	
2011	Spain	Barcelona	4–0	Santos	Brazil	International Stadium Yokohama, Yokohama	Japan	68,166	
2012	Brazil	Corinthians	1–0	Chelsea	England	International Stadium Yokohama, Yokohama	Japan	68,275	
2013	Germany	Bayern Munich	2–0	Raja Casablanca	Morocco	Stade de Marrakech, Marrakesh	Morocco	37,774	
2014	Spain	Real Madrid	2–0	San Lorenzo	Argentina	Stade de Marrakech, Marrakesh	Morocco	38,345	
2015	Spain	Barcelona	3–0	River Plate	Argentina	International Stadium Yokohama, Yokohama	Japan	66,853	
2016	Spain	Real Madrid	4–2^{†} (Note: Score was 2–2 after 90 minutes.)	Kashima Antlers	Japan	International Stadium Yokohama, Yokohama	Japan	68,742	
2017	Spain	Real Madrid	1–0	Grêmio	Brazil	Zayed Sports City Stadium, Abu Dhabi	United Arab Emirates	41,094	
2018	Spain	Real Madrid	4–1	Al-Ain	United Arab Emirates	Zayed Sports City Stadium, Abu Dhabi	United Arab Emirates	40,696	
2019	England	Liverpool	1–0^{†} (Note: Score was 0–0 after 90 minutes.)	Flamengo	Brazil	Khalifa International Stadium, Doha	Qatar	45,416	
2020	Germany	Bayern Munich	1–0	UANL	Mexico	Education City Stadium, Al Rayyan	Qatar	7,411	
2021	England	Chelsea	2–1^{†} (Note: Score was 1–1 after 90 minutes.)	Palmeiras	Brazil	Mohammed bin Zayed Stadium, Abu Dhabi	United Arab Emirates	32,871	
2022	Spain	Real Madrid	5–3	Al-Hilal	Saudi Arabia	Prince Moulay Abdellah Stadium, Rabat	Morocco	44,439	
2023	England	Manchester City	4–0	Fluminense	Brazil	King Abdullah Sports City, Jeddah	Saudi Arabia	52,601	
2025	England	Chelsea	3–0	Paris Saint-Germain	France	Metlife Stadium, East Rutherford	United States	81,118	

Footnotes

== Statistics ==
=== Results by club ===
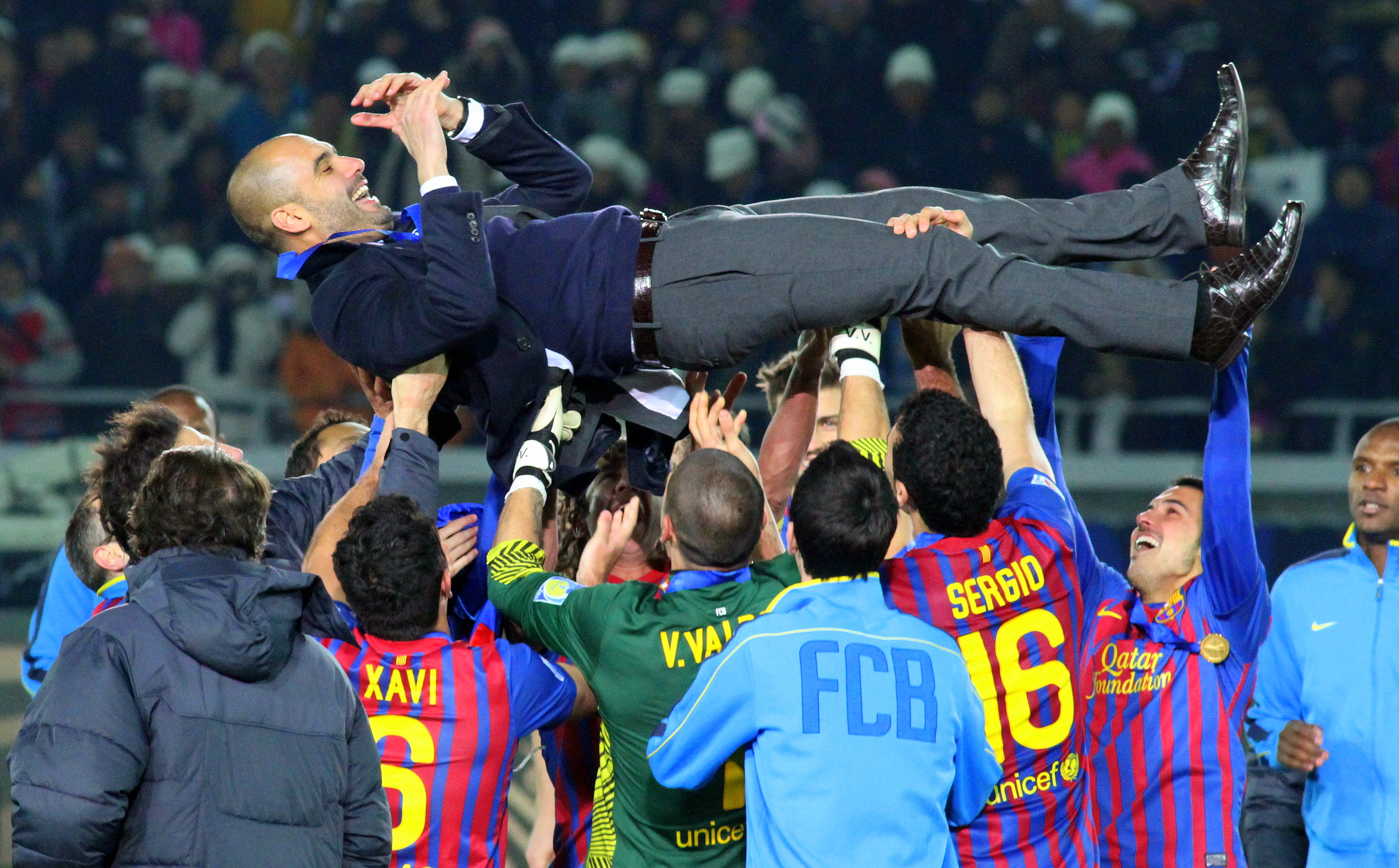
Pep Guardiola is hoisted by his players after Barcelona won the 2011 FIFA Club World Cup. Barcelona is the second most successful club of the competition after Real Madrid, with three triumphant campaigns.

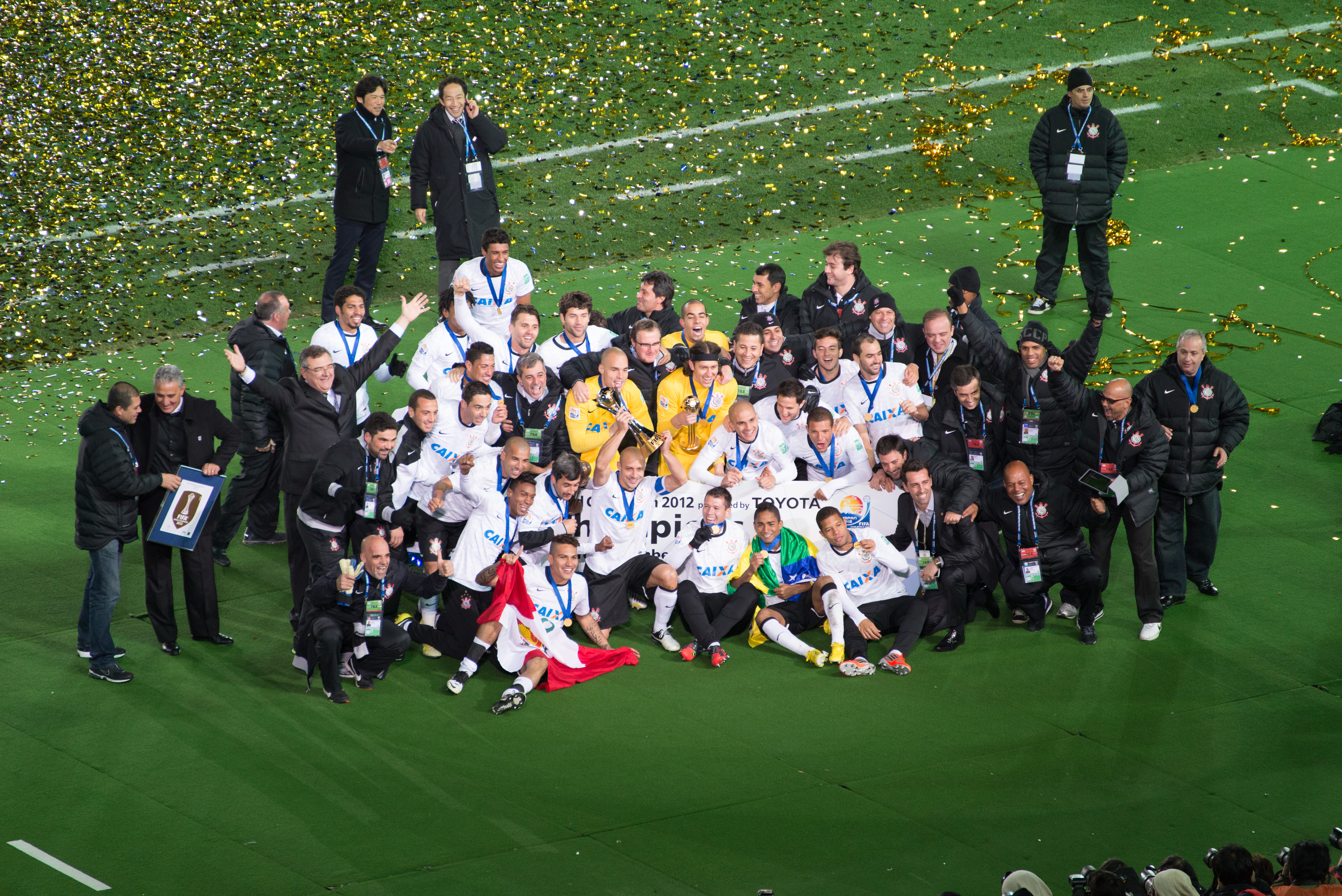
The Corinthians squad of 2012 celebrating after winning the 2012 FIFA Club World Cup. The Timão is also the only world champion that qualified to the Club World Cup by merit of being the host nation's national champion.

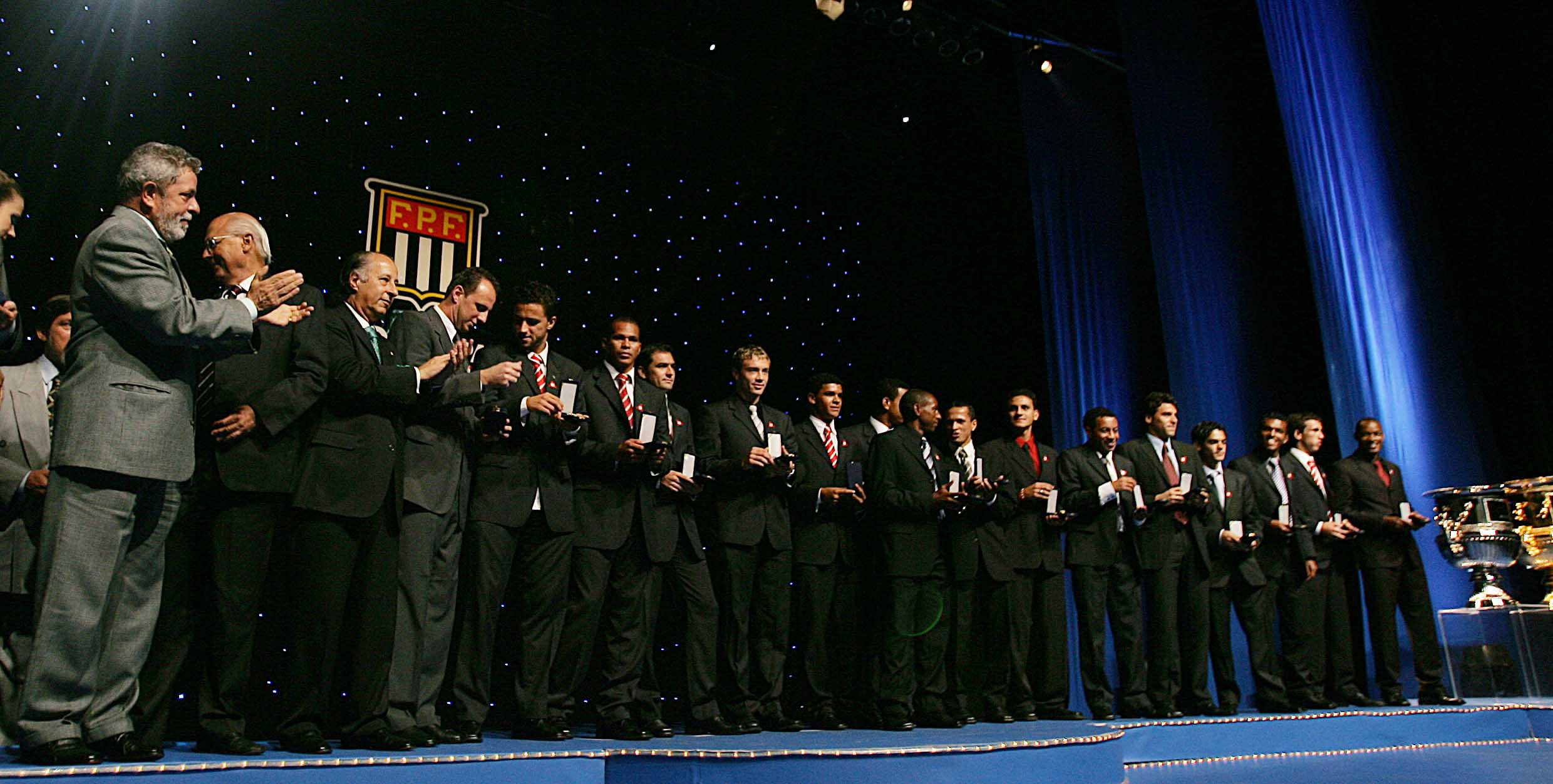
São Paulo's players are congratulated by the Brazilian president Lula da Silva after winning the 2005 FIFA Club World Championship at the Federação Paulista de Futebol (FPF). Brazil is the only national league outside of Europe to have a club win the competition. It has also provided the most non-European finalists, with nine in total. The 2000 decider, an all-Brazilian affair, remains the only final contested between two clubs from the same nation.

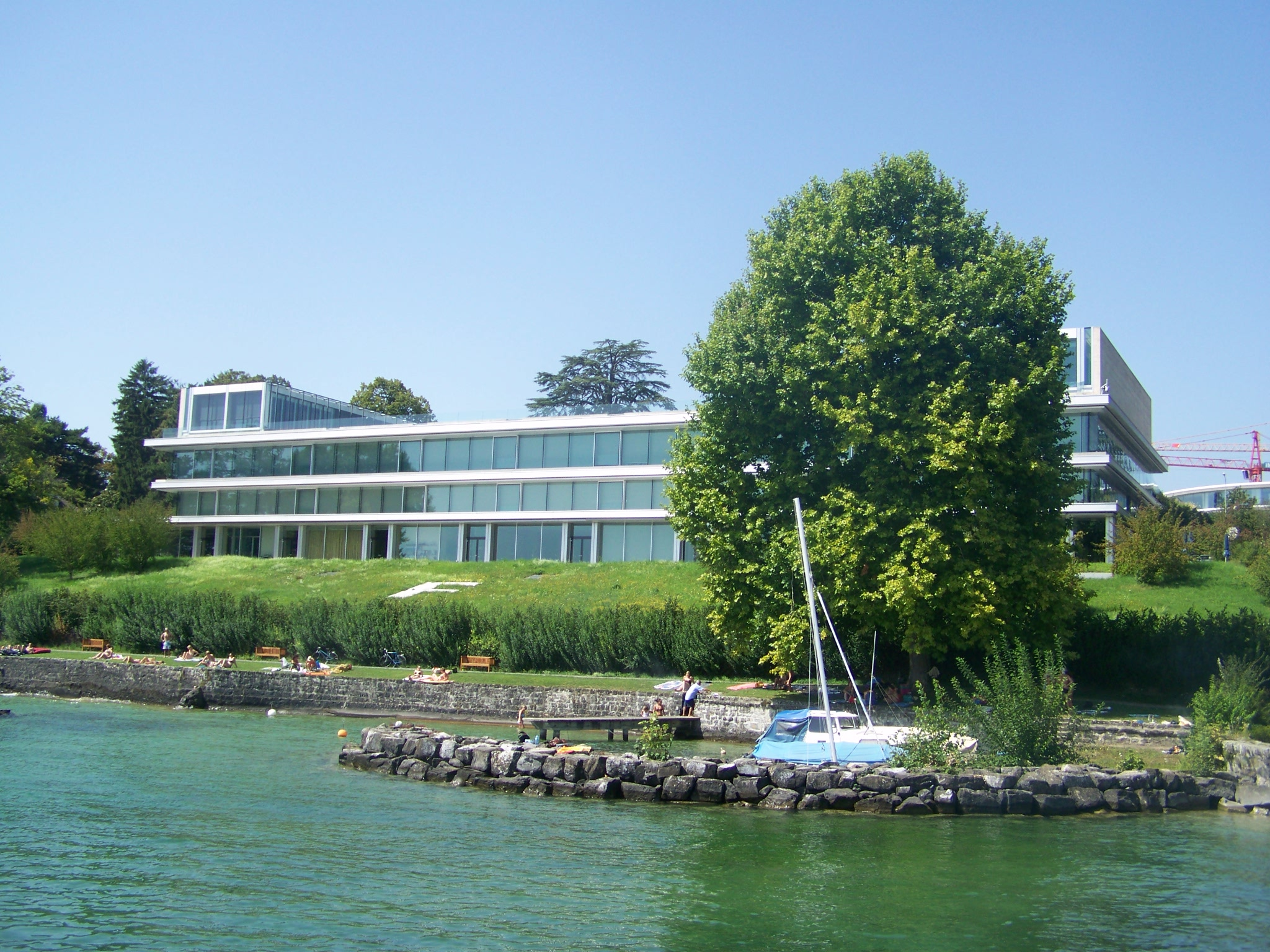
The headquarters of the Union of European Football Associations, or UEFA, in Nyon, Switzerland. UEFA is the most successful confederation of the competition, with sixteen titles won between nine clubs.

Real Madrid holds the record number of victories in the competition with five. Corinthians remain the only club World Champion to have qualified to the competition by being the host nation's national champion.

Performance by club
Club	Titles	Runners-up	Years won	Years runners-up
(Spain) Real Madrid	5	0	2014, 2016, 2017, 2018, 2022	—
(Spain) Barcelona	3	1	2009, 2011, 2015	2006
(Brazil) Corinthians	2	0	2000, 2012	—
(Germany) Bayern Munich	2	0	2013, 2020	—
(England) Chelsea	2	1	2021, 2025	2012
(England) Liverpool	1	1	2019	2005
(Brazil) São Paulo	1	0	2005	—
(Brazil) Internacional	1	0	2006	—
(Italy) Milan	1	0	2007	—
(England) Manchester United	1	0	2008	—
(Italy) Internazionale	1	0	2010	—
(England) Manchester City	1	0	2023	—
(Brazil) Vasco da Gama	0	1	—	2000
(Argentina) Boca Juniors	0	1	—	2007
(Ecuador) LDU Quito	0	1	—	2008
(Argentina) Estudiantes	0	1	—	2009
(Democratic Republic of the Congo) TP Mazembe	0	1	—	2010
(Brazil) Santos	0	1	—	2011
(Morocco) Raja Casablanca	0	1	—	2013
(Argentina) San Lorenzo	0	1	—	2014
(Argentina) River Plate	0	1	—	2015
(Japan) Kashima Antlers	0	1	—	2016
(Brazil) Grêmio	0	1	—	2017
(United Arab Emirates) Al-Ain	0	1	—	2018
(Brazil) Flamengo	0	1	—	2019
(Mexico) UANL	0	1	—	2020
(Brazil) Palmeiras	0	1	—	2021
(Saudi Arabia) Al-Hilal	0	1	—	2022
(Brazil) Fluminense	0	1	—	2023
(France) Paris Saint-Germain	0	1	—	2025

=== Results by nation ===
Spain's La Liga is the most successful national league of the competition, with eight titles won, England's Premier League are second with five titles and Brazil's Brasileirão are third with four titles. Italy's Serie A and Germany's Bundesliga are fifth with two titles each. Serie A and the Bundesliga were the only undefeated national leagues which have had representatives play in the competition before the first edition with 32 teams in 2025. Argentina's Primera División carries the dubious honour of losing the most finals without ever winning the world title, with four defeats.

Performance by nation
Nation	Winners	Runners-up	Finalists
Spain	8	1	9
England	5	2	7
Brazil	4	6	10
Italy	2	0	2
Germany	2	0	2
Argentina	0	4	4
DR Congo	0	1	1
Ecuador	0	1	1
Morocco	0	1	1
Japan	0	1	1
United Arab Emirates	0	1	1
Mexico	0	1	1
Saudi Arabia	0	1	1
France	0	1	1

=== Results by confederation ===
Confederation	Titles	Runners-up
UEFA	17	3
CONMEBOL	4	11
AFC	—	3
CAF	—	2
CONCACAF	—	1

=== Results by manager ===
Performance by manager
Nationality	Manager	Winner	Runner-up	Years won	Years runner-up
ESP	Pep Guardiola	4	—	2009, 2011, 2013, 2023	—
ITA	Carlo Ancelotti	3	—	2007, 2014, 2022	—
FRA	Zinedine Zidane	2	—	2016, 2017	—
ESP	Rafael Benítez	1	2	2010	2005, 2012
ESP	Luis Enrique	1	1	2015	2025
BRA	Oswaldo de Oliveira	1	—	2000	—
BRA	Paulo Autuori	1	—	2005	—
BRA	Abel Braga	1	—	2006	—
SCO	Alex Ferguson	1	—	2008	—
BRA	Tite	1	—	2012	—
ARG	Santiago Solari	1	—	2018	—
GER	Jürgen Klopp	1	—	2019	—
GER	Hansi Flick	1	—	2020	—
GER	Thomas Tuchel	1	—	2021	—
ITA	Enzo Maresca	1	—	2025	—
ARG	Edgardo Bauza	—	2	—	2008, 2014
BRA	Antônio Lopes	—	1	—	2000
NED	Frank Rijkaard	—	1	—	2006
ARG	Miguel Ángel Russo	—	1	—	2007
ARG	Alejandro Sabella	—	1	—	2009
SEN	Lamine N'Diaye	—	1	—	2010
BRA	Muricy Ramalho	—	1	—	2011
TUN	Faouzi Benzarti	—	1	—	2013
ARG	Marcelo Gallardo	—	1	—	2015
JPN	Masatada Ishii	—	1	—	2016
BRA	Renato Portaluppi	—	1	—	2017
CRO	Zoran Mamić	—	1	—	2018
POR	Jorge Jesus	—	1	—	2019
BRA	Ricardo Ferretti	—	1	—	2020
POR	Abel Ferreira	—	1	—	2021
ARG	Ramón Díaz	—	1	—	2022
BRA	Fernando Diniz	—	1	—	2023

== See also ==
- List of Intercontinental Cup matches
- FIFA Intercontinental Cup
