= Chelsea F.C. in international football =

English club in international football

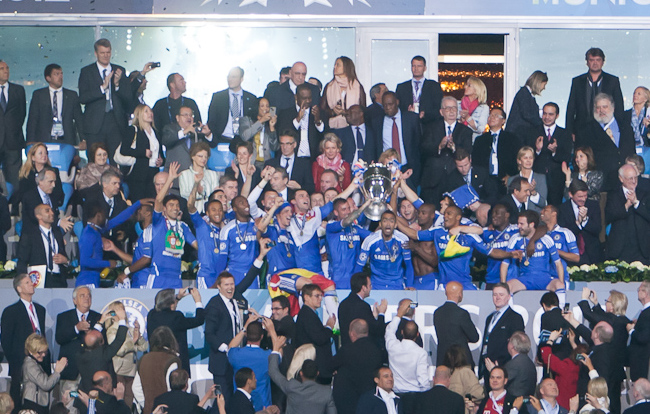
- Chelsea celebrate winning their first Champions League title in 2012
- Club: Chelsea
- Seasons played: 33
- Most appearances: John Terry (124)
- Top scorer: Didier Drogba (36)
- First entry: 1958–1960 Inter-Cities Fairs Cup
- Latest entry: 2025–26 UEFA Champions League

Titles
- Champions League: 2 (2012, 2021)
- Europa League: 2 (2013, 2019)
- Cup Winners' Cup: 2 (1971, 1998)
- Conference League: 1 (2025)
- Super Cup: 2 (1998, 2021)
- FIFA Club World Cup: 2 (2021, 2025)

Chelsea Football Club are an English professional football club based in Fulham, London. They have won eleven international trophies, second only to Liverpool in the number of international trophies won among British clubs. These consist of the UEFA Champions League (formerly the European Cup) twice, the UEFA Cup Winners' Cup (formerly the European Cup Winners' Cup) twice, the UEFA Europa League (formerly the UEFA Cup) twice, the UEFA Conference League once, the UEFA Super Cup twice, and the FIFA Club World Cup twice.

As the champions of England, Chelsea were invited to participate in the inaugural European Cup in 1955; however, they were pressured into withdrawing from the tournament by the Football League. Three years later, in 1958, Chelsea made their European debut against Copenhagen XI in the Inter-Cities Fairs Cup. The club has played in European football in almost every season since 1997–98, only missing the feat three times in that period. Chelsea won their first European title in 1971, defeating Real Madrid in the final to win the European Cup Winners' Cup.

In 2012, Chelsea won the UEFA Champions League, becoming the fifth English team, and the first and only team from London to date, to win the competition. A year later, Chelsea won the UEFA Europa League and became the fourth club to win all three main UEFA club competitions (Champions League, Cup Winners' Cup, and Europa League) at the time. Due to a change in competition dates, with the final of the Champions League being played a week after the Europa League final, Chelsea held both the Champions and Europa League trophies simultaneously, the only side to ever do so. In 2021, Chelsea won their second Champions League title, giving them the distinction of being the only club to have won all of UEFA's three main club competitions more than once. After winning the UEFA Conference League in 2025, a competition that had been established four years earlier, they became the first club to win all four major UEFA men's club competitions.

In European competitions, John Terry holds the club's record for the most appearances, with 124, while Didier Drogba holds the record for the most goals scored, with 36. Chelsea's biggest European win is 13–0, which came against Jeunesse Hautcharage in the Cup Winners' Cup in 1971. Their 21–0 aggregate win over the same opposition is a joint-record in European football.

== History ==
=== Early years and first trophy: 1955 to 1971 ===
In 1955, Chelsea were invited to take part in the inaugural European Cup, now UEFA Champions League, after they claimed their first domestic league title in the 1954–55 season. However, the club declined the invitation after the Football League's secretary, Alan Hardaker, advised them to withdraw, as domestic competitions should take priority. Chelsea had to wait another three years for their European debut, as the club entered the Inter-Cities Fairs Cup for the 1958–1960 season. Chelsea's first match in European football was against Copenhagen XI in the first round of the competition, which they won 7–2 on aggregate.

As winners of the 1970 FA Cup, Chelsea qualified for the 1970–71 edition of the European Cup Winners' Cup (later renamed as the UEFA Cup Winners' Cup), a UEFA governed competition contested by the winners of domestic cup competitions. The club eliminated Greek side Aris Thessaloniki and Bulgarian club CSKA Sofia in the first two rounds of the competition. In the quarter-finals, Chelsea lost the first leg 2–0 away to Club Brugge, but won 4–0 after extra time at Stamford Bridge to advance to the semi-finals; Chelsea player Tommy Baldwin described the match as "the best game I've ever been involved in". The club then eliminated fellow English team and defending Cup Winners' Cup champions Manchester City, winning both matches by a solitary goal. In the final, Chelsea defeated Spain's Real Madrid 2–1 in a replay (the first game ended in a draw), with first-half goals from Peter Osgood and John Dempsey, to win the club's first major international honour.

=== Further Cup Winners' Cup success and Champions League debut: 1994 to 2000 ===
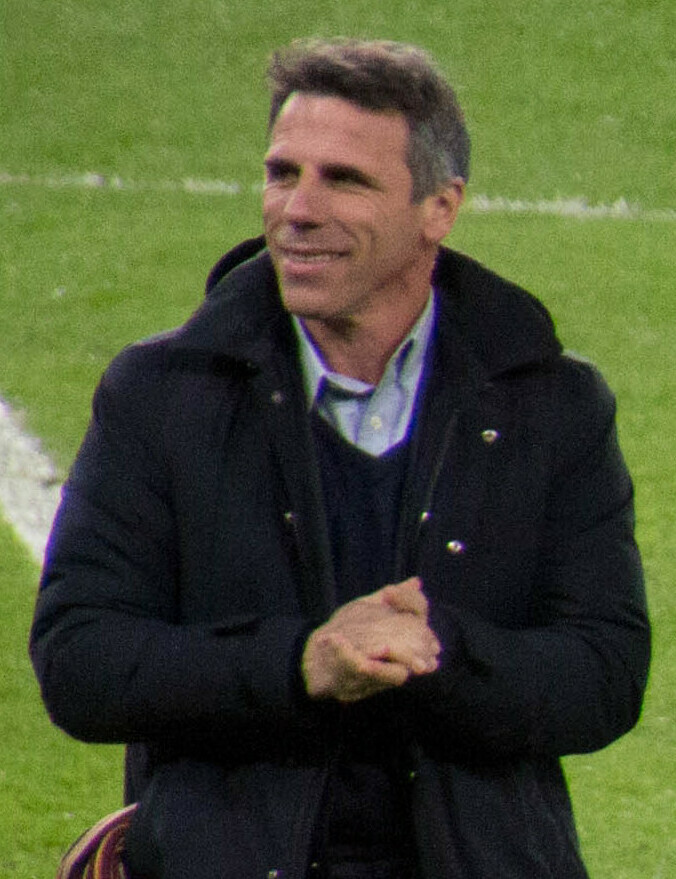
Gianfranco Zola scored the winning goal in the 1998 Cup Winners' Cup final.

After their success in 1971, the club had to wait more than two decades for their next European game. Despite losing the 1994 FA Cup final to Manchester United, Chelsea still qualified for the 1994–95 UEFA Cup Winners' Cup, as United qualified for the Champions League through domestic league performance. Chelsea reached the semi-finals of the competition, where they were eliminated by Zaragoza. After losing the first leg 3–0 away, Chelsea won the second leg 3–1 and were eliminated 4–3 on aggregate. In the 1997–98 UEFA Cup Winners' Cup season, Chelsea won the competition for the second time, defeating VfB Stuttgart 1–0 in the final in Stockholm, with Gianfranco Zola scoring a second-half winner. As winners, Chelsea earned the right to play against the 1997–98 UEFA Champions League winners, Real Madrid, in the 1998 UEFA Super Cup. Gus Poyet scored the winning goal for Chelsea in the 83rd minute after coming on from the bench in the second half, securing Chelsea's first Super Cup trophy.

Chelsea made their debut in the premier European football competition, the UEFA Champions League, in the 1999–2000 season. The team progressed through the group stage and the second group stage to reach the quarter-finals, where they faced Barcelona, reigning champions of Spain. Chelsea won the first leg 3–1 at Stamford Bridge, with Zola scoring the opener and Tore André Flo scoring a brace. However, they were defeated 5–1 after extra time in Spain two weeks later and were eliminated from the competition with a 6–4 aggregate score.

=== Champions League near-misses and the 'Miracle of Munich': 2004 to 2012 ===
Chelsea qualified for the 2003–04 Champions League by finishing fourth in the 2002–03 FA Premier League. Their place in the Champions League was secured on the final day of the season, beating fifth-placed Liverpool 2–1 at home. The game was dubbed 'the £20m match' as Chelsea were only ahead of Liverpool on goal difference before kickoff; a win for either side would see them qualify for the following season's Champions League at the expense of the other. Jesper Grønkjær scored the winner in the first half; the goal was later considered by many to be the most important in the club's history and is said to be worth £1 billion, with many believing that if Liverpool had won that day, the subsequent takeover by Russian billionaire Roman Abramovich would never have happened. During this period, Chelsea assembled a team that would be influential in the following years' Champions League campaigns and subsequent Champions League victory, led by players such as Petr Čech, John Terry, Frank Lampard and Didier Drogba.

In 2003–04, Chelsea reached the semi-finals after defeating London rivals Arsenal. Having not beaten Arsenal since November 1998, they went into the second leg with a 1–1 home draw. In the second leg at Highbury, José Antonio Reyes' goal before the half-time gave the Gunners the lead, however, Chelsea managed to come back and won in the second half through Lampard's goal within six minutes of the restart and Wayne Bridge's winning goal in the 87th minute. In the first leg of the semi-final, Chelsea lost 3–1 to ten-man Monaco at the Stade Louis II. Two weeks later at Stamford Bridge, Chelsea were leading 2–0 shortly before the half-time. Had they kept this score until the end of the match, they would go through to the final on the away goals rule. However, Monaco eventually came back in the second half and the game ended in a 2–2 draw. As a consequence, Claudio Ranieri was sacked at the end of the season.

Between 2005 and 2009, Chelsea came close to winning the Champions League several times. In 2004–05, the club, managed by José Mourinho, reached the semi-finals, where they were eliminated by eventual champions Liverpool 1–0 on aggregate. The match was notable for the so-called "ghost goal" scored by Luis García, a goal that shouldn't have stood as the ball allegedly never crossed the goal line. Two years later, in 2007, Chelsea were on the verge of the final, but were again stopped by Liverpool in the semi-finals, this time losing on penalties.

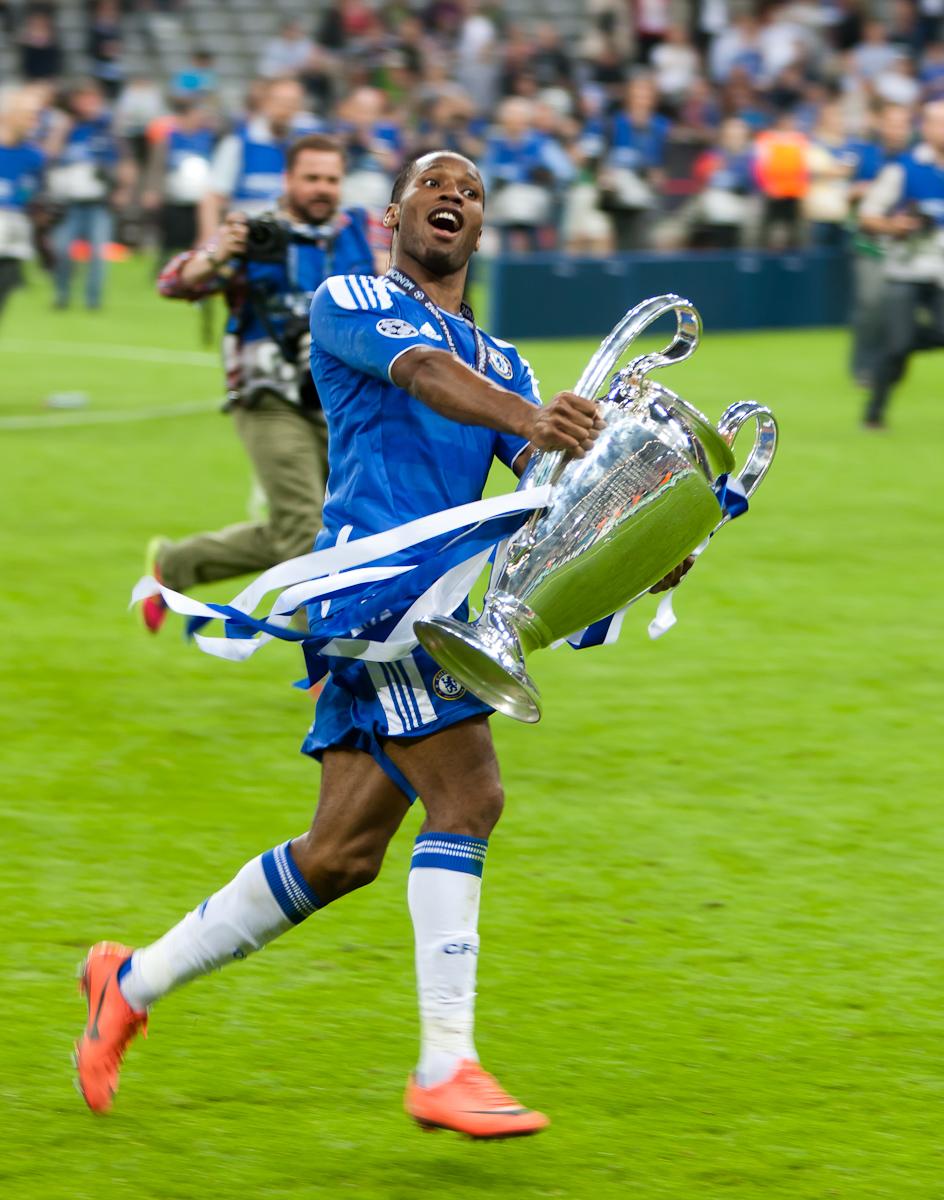
Didier Drogba celebrates Chelsea's first UEFA Champions League title against Bayern Munich.

In 2008, Chelsea reached the final after finally defeating Liverpool in the semi-finals at their third attempt in four seasons. The 2008 final, held at the Luzhniki Stadium in Moscow, was the first ever all-English Champions League final, with Chelsea facing Manchester United. The game was tightly contested, with the final score after extra time being 1–1. In the penalty shoot-out, Chelsea were one kick away from winning the Champions League after Čech saved Cristiano Ronaldo's penalty. However, Chelsea's captain Terry slipped on his run up and his shot hit the post. Edwin van der Sar then saved Nicolas Anelka's spot kick and Manchester United were crowned European champions for the third time. The following season, Chelsea were on course to make their second final in two years. Following a 0–0 draw away against Barcelona, Chelsea were leading 1–0 at Stamford Bridge, but Barcelona managed to score an equaliser in the 94th minute of the game, progressing to the final on away goals. Several Chelsea players protested against the referee's decisions after the final whistle, most notable José Bosingwa and Drogba. The latter shouted into television cameras that the game was "a fucking disgrace", and both players were handed bans by UEFA for their actions. The match referee, Tom Henning Øvrebø, received death threats and had to be smuggled out of Britain by police.

Chelsea would not appear in the Champions League final again until the 2012 edition, which was held at the Allianz Arena in Munich. After eliminating Napoli, Benfica and Barcelona in the knockout rounds, Chelsea faced Bayern Munich, who would play the final at home, but due to the UEFA rules, the venue was officially counted as a neutral. Bayern controlled the match for the most part and took the lead in the 83rd minute through a shot from Thomas Müller. Drogba equalised five minutes later with a header from Juan Mata's corner. In extra time, Bayern missed several opportunities, including a penalty from former Chelsea player Arjen Robben, and the match went to penalties. Chelsea eventually triumphed 4–3, despite Mata missing the first penalty. Two Bayern players, Ivica Olić and Bastian Schweinsteiger, failed to convert their penalties, while Drogba scored the final penalty of the shoot-out to secure the Blues' first ever Champions League title. As Chelsea faced 35 shots on goal and 20 corners in the final, the match has been dubbed the "Miracle of Munich" due to Chelsea's unlikely victory on Bayern's home soil. As title holders, Chelsea secured a place in next season's Champions League after missing out of qualification, as a result of finishing sixth in Premier League, and earned the right to play in the 2012 UEFA Super Cup against the 2011–12 UEFA Europa League winners, Atlético Madrid, which they lost. They also qualified for the 2012 FIFA Club World Cup, where Chelsea failed to become world champions after losing to Corinthians in the final.

=== Europa League winners and second Champions League trophy: 2013 to 2021 ===
Chelsea became the first Champions League holder to exit in the group stage of the competition the following year, after finishing third in their group behind Juventus and Shakhtar Donetsk. However, they continued their season in the UEFA Europa League and eventually won the competition after defeating Benfica in the final with an injury-time header by Branislav Ivanović. By winning the Europa League, Chelsea became the fourth club to win all three main UEFA club competitions at the time. In the subsequent 2013 UEFA Super Cup, Chelsea lost on penalties against Bayern Munich.

Chelsea repeated the feat and won another Europa League title in 2019, defeating London rivals Arsenal 4–1 in the final. After this success, the club qualified for the 2019 UEFA Super Cup, where they again lost on penalties, this time against Liverpool, the winners of the 2018–19 UEFA Champions League.

Nine years after their first Champions League triumph, Chelsea were able to secure a place in the 2021 final, which was held at Estádio do Dragão in Porto against fellow English side Manchester City. It was the third time that two English sides would face in the final (after 2008 – which Chelsea also involved – and 2019). Despite the odds being in Manchester City's favour and City dominating the possession throughout the game, Chelsea prevailed and were crowned European champions for the second time, after Kai Havertz scored the only goal of the match three minutes before half-time, when he collected a pass from Mason Mount to round City goalkeeper Ederson and score. As title holders, Chelsea earned the right to play in the 2021 UEFA Super Cup against the 2020–21 UEFA Europa League winners, Villarreal. After losing in the previous three Super Cup games, Chelsea finally won the competition for the second time after triumphing on penalties. They also qualified for the 2021 FIFA Club World Cup, where Chelsea became world champions for the first time after winning the final against Palmeiras.

=== Completing the collection with Conference League and club world champions: 2025 to present ===
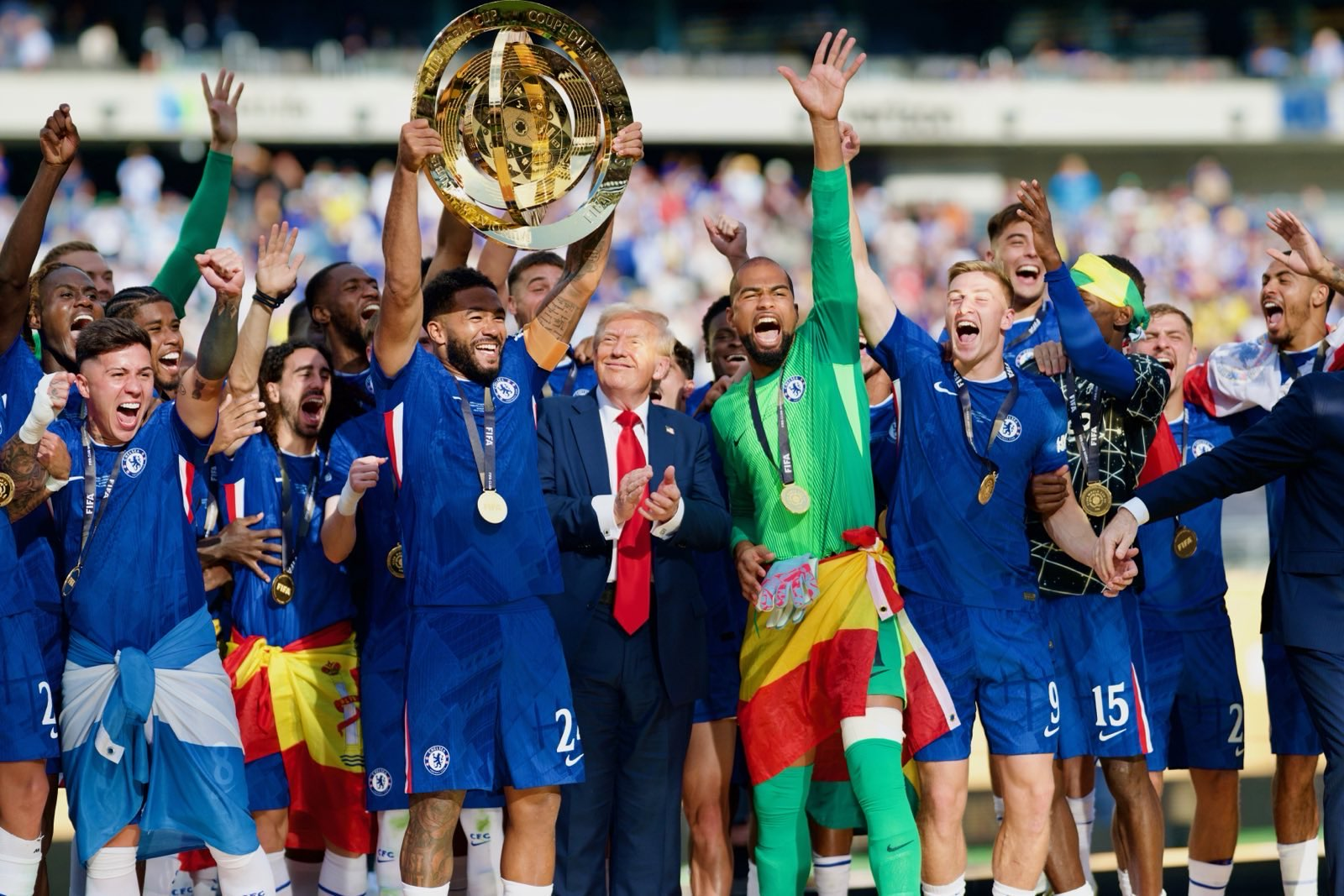
Reece James lifting the FIFA Club World Cup trophy in 2025.

In the 2024–25 season, Chelsea competed in the newly-established UEFA Conference League, the third-tier European competition, and lifted the trophy after beating Real Betis 4–1 in the final. Chelsea won 12 of their 13 matches during the season (excluding qualifying rounds), and also scored 42 goals, a record by an English club in a single season in major European competition. By winning, they became the first club to win all five major UEFA men's club competitions (Champions League, Europa League, Cup Winners' Cup, Super Cup, and Conference League).

As the winners of the 2020–21 Champions League, Chelsea earned a place in the expanded 2025 FIFA Club World Cup, the first edition to feature 32 teams. Managed by Enzo Maresca and led by Cole Palmer, who won the tournament's best player award, Chelsea defeated the reigning European champions Paris Saint-Germain 3–0 in the final to become world champions for the second time.

== Records ==
- First international match: Copenhagen XI v. Chelsea, 1958–1960 Inter-Cities Fairs Cup, 30 September 1958
- Biggest win in international competitions: 13–0, Chelsea v. Jeunesse Hautcharage, 1971–72 UEFA Cup Winners' Cup, 29 September 1971
- Biggest defeat in international competitions: 5–0, Barcelona v. Chelsea, 1965–66 Inter-Cities Fairs Cup, 25 May 1966
- Most appearances in international competitions: John Terry, 124
- Most goals in international competitions: Didier Drogba, 36
- Youngest player to start in international competitions: Reggie Walsh (aged 16 years and 200 days), Chelsea v. Djurgårdens IF, 2024–25 UEFA Conference League, 8 May 2025

== Matches ==
All results (home, away, neutral, and aggregate) list Chelsea's goal tally first.

Colour key

Wins
Draws
Losses
Finals won
Finals lost

Chelsea F.C. results in international competitions
Season	Competition	Round	Opposition	Home	Away	Aggregate	Notes	Ref.
1958–59	Inter-Cities Fairs Cup	First round	(Denmark) Copenhagen XI	4–1	3–1	7–2	(Note: The first leg was played away, and the second leg was played at home.)	
1958–59	Inter-Cities Fairs Cup	Quarter-final	(Socialist Federal Republic of Yugoslavia) Belgrade XI	1–0	1–4	2–4	(Note: The first leg was played at home, and the second leg was played away.)	
1965–66	Inter-Cities Fairs Cup	First round	(Italy) Roma	4–1	0–0	4–1		
1965–66	Inter-Cities Fairs Cup	Second round	(Austria) Wiener Sport-Club	2–0	0–1	2–1		
1965–66	Inter-Cities Fairs Cup	Third round	(Italy) AC Milan	2–1	1–2	3–3	1–1 (Note: Extra time was necessary for this match.) (Note: This playoff match was played away at San Siro and won on coin toss.)	
1965–66	Inter-Cities Fairs Cup	Quarter-final	(West Germany) 1860 Munich	1–0	2–2	3–2		
1965–66	Inter-Cities Fairs Cup	Semi-final	(Spain) Barcelona	2–0	0–2	2–2	0–5 (Note: This playoff match was played away at Camp Nou.)	
1968–69	Inter-Cities Fairs Cup	First round	(Scotland) Greenock Morton	5–0	4–3	9–3		
1968–69	Inter-Cities Fairs Cup	Second round	(Netherlands) DWS	0–0	0–0	0–0	(Note: Extra time was necessary for the away match.) (Note: Lost on coin toss.)	
1970–71	European Cup Winners' Cup	First round	(Greece) Aris Thessaloniki	5–1	1–1	6–2		
1970–71	European Cup Winners' Cup	Second round	(Bulgaria) CSKA Sofia	1–0	1–0	2–0		
1970–71	European Cup Winners' Cup	Quarter-final	(Belgium) Club Brugge	4–0	0–2	4–2	(Note: Extra time was necessary for the home match.)	
1970–71	European Cup Winners' Cup	Semi-final	(England) Manchester City	1–0	1–0	2–0		
1970–71	European Cup Winners' Cup	Final	(Spain) Real Madrid	1–1			2–1 (Note: Extra time was necessary for the first match.) (Note: Replay of the final.) (Note: Both matches were played at a neutral venue, Karaiskakis Stadium.)	
1971–72	European Cup Winners' Cup	First round	(Luxembourg) Jeunesse Hautcharage	13–0	8–0	21–0		
1971–72	European Cup Winners' Cup	Second round	(Sweden) Åtvidaberg	1–1	0–0	1–1	(Note: Away goals rule.)	
1994–95	UEFA Cup Winners' Cup	First round	(Czech Republic) Viktoria Žižkov	4–2	0–0	4–2		
1994–95	UEFA Cup Winners' Cup	Second round	Austria Vienna	0–0	1–1	1–1		
1994–95	UEFA Cup Winners' Cup	Quarter-final	(Belgium) Club Brugge	2–0	0–1	2–1		
1994–95	UEFA Cup Winners' Cup	Semi-final	(Spain) Zaragoza	3–1	0–3	3–4		
1997–98	UEFA Cup Winners' Cup	First round	(Slovakia) Slovan Bratislava	2–0	2–0	4–0		
1997–98	UEFA Cup Winners' Cup	Second round	(Norway) Tromsø	7–1	2–3	9–4		
1997–98	UEFA Cup Winners' Cup	Quarter-final	(Spain) Real Betis	3–1	2–1	5–2		
1997–98	UEFA Cup Winners' Cup	Semi-final	(Italy) Vicenza	3–1	0–1	3–2		
1997–98	UEFA Cup Winners' Cup	Final	(Germany) VfB Stuttgart	1–0			(Note: The match was played at a neutral venue, Råsunda Stadium.)	
1998–99	UEFA Super Cup		(Spain) Real Madrid	1–0			(Note: The match was played at a neutral venue, Stade Louis II.)	
1998–99	UEFA Cup Winners' Cup	First round	(Sweden) Helsingborg	1–0	0–0	1–0		
1998–99	UEFA Cup Winners' Cup	Second round	(Denmark) Copenhagen	1–1	1–0	2–1		
1998–99	UEFA Cup Winners' Cup	Quarter-final	(Norway) Vålerenga	3–0	3–2	6–2		
1998–99	UEFA Cup Winners' Cup	Semi-final	(Spain) Mallorca	1–1	0–1	1–2		
1999–2000	UEFA Champions League	Third qualifying round	(Latvia) Skonto	3–0	0–0	3–0		
1999–2000	UEFA Champions League	First group stage (Group H)	(Italy) AC Milan	0–0	1–1	1st of 4	(Note: The first match was played at home, and the fifth match was played away.)	
1999–2000	UEFA Champions League	First group stage (Group H)	(Germany) Hertha Berlin	2–0	1–2	1st of 4	(Note: The second match was played away, and the sixth match was played at home.)	
1999–2000	UEFA Champions League	First group stage (Group H)	(Turkey) Galatasaray	1–0	5–0	1st of 4	(Note: The third match was played at home, and the fourth match was played away.)	
1999–2000	UEFA Champions League	Second group stage (Group D)	(Netherlands) Feyenoord	3–1	3–1	2nd of 4		
1999–2000	UEFA Champions League	Second group stage (Group D)	(Italy) Lazio	1–2	0–0	2nd of 4		
1999–2000	UEFA Champions League	Second group stage (Group D)	(France) Marseille	1–0	0–1	2nd of 4	(Note: The third match was played away, and the fourth match was played at home.)	
1999–2000	UEFA Champions League	Quarter-final	(Spain) Barcelona	3–1	1–5	4–6		
2000–01	UEFA Cup	First round	(Switzerland) St. Gallen	1–0	0–2	1–2		
2001–02	UEFA Cup	First round	(Bulgaria) Levski Sofia	3–0	2–0	5–0		
2001–02	UEFA Cup	Second round	(Israel) Hapoel Tel Aviv	1–1	0–2	1–3		
2002–03	UEFA Cup	First round	(Norway) Viking	2–1	2–4	4–5		
2003–04	UEFA Champions League	Third qualifying round	(Slovakia) Žilina	3–0	2–0	5–0		
2003–04	UEFA Champions League	Group stage (Group G)	(Czech Republic) Sparta Prague	0–0	1–0	1st of 4	(Note: The first match was played away, and the fifth match was played at home.)	
2003–04	UEFA Champions League	Group stage (Group G)	(Turkey) Beşiktaş	0–2	2–0	1st of 4	(Note: The second match was played at home, and the sixth match was played away.) (Note: The away match was played at Arena AufSchalke due to the 2003 Istanbul bombings.)	
2003–04	UEFA Champions League	Group stage (Group G)	(Italy) Lazio	2–1	4–0	1st of 4		
2003–04	UEFA Champions League	Round of 16	(Germany) VfB Stuttgart	0–0	1–0	1–0		
2003–04	UEFA Champions League	Quarter-final	(England) Arsenal	1–1	2–1	3–2		
2003–04	UEFA Champions League	Semi-final	(France) Monaco	2–2	1–3	3–5		
2004–05	UEFA Champions League	Group stage (Group H)	(France) Paris Saint-Germain	0–0	3–0	1st of 4		
2004–05	UEFA Champions League	Group stage (Group H)	(Portugal) Porto	3–1	1–2	1st of 4		
2004–05	UEFA Champions League	Group stage (Group H)	(Russia) CSKA Moscow	2–0	1–0	1st of 4		
2004–05	UEFA Champions League	Round of 16	(Spain) Barcelona	4–2	1–2	5–4		
2004–05	UEFA Champions League	Quarter-final	(Germany) Bayern Munich	4–2	2–3	6–5		
2004–05	UEFA Champions League	Semi-final	(England) Liverpool	0–0	0–1	0–1		
2005–06	UEFA Champions League	Group stage (Group G)	(Belgium) Anderlecht	1–0	2–0	2nd of 4		
2005–06	UEFA Champions League	Group stage (Group G)	(England) Liverpool	0–0	0–0	2nd of 4		
2005–06	UEFA Champions League	Group stage (Group G)	(Spain) Real Betis	4–0	0–1	2nd of 4		
2005–06	UEFA Champions League	Round of 16	(Spain) Barcelona	1–2	1–1	2–3		
2006–07	UEFA Champions League	Group stage (Group A)	(Germany) Werder Bremen	2–0	0–1	1st of 4		
2006–07	UEFA Champions League	Group stage (Group A)	(Bulgaria) Levski Sofia	2–0	3–1	1st of 4		
2006–07	UEFA Champions League	Group stage (Group A)	(Spain) Barcelona	1–0	2–2	1st of 4		
2006–07	UEFA Champions League	Round of 16	(Portugal) Porto	2–1	1–1	3–2		
2006–07	UEFA Champions League	Quarter-final	(Spain) Valencia	1–1	2–1	3–2		
2006–07	UEFA Champions League	Semi-final	(England) Liverpool	1–0	0–1	1–1	(Note: Lost 1–4 on penalty shoot-out.)	
2007–08	UEFA Champions League	Group stage (Group B)	(Norway) Rosenborg	1–1	4–0	1st of 4		
2007–08	UEFA Champions League	Group stage (Group B)	(Spain) Valencia	0–0	2–1	1st of 4		
2007–08	UEFA Champions League	Group stage (Group B)	(Germany) Schalke 04	2–0	0–0	1st of 4		
2007–08	UEFA Champions League	Round of 16	(Greece) Olympiacos	3–0	0–0	3–0		
2007–08	UEFA Champions League	Quarter-final	(Turkey) Fenerbahçe	2–0	1–2	3–2		
2007–08	UEFA Champions League	Semi-final	(England) Liverpool	3–2	1–1	4–3		
2007–08	UEFA Champions League	Final	(England) Manchester United	1–1			(Note: Extra time was necessary for the match.) (Note: Lost 5–6 on penalty shoot-out.) (Note: The match was played at a neutral venue, Luzhniki Stadium.)	
2008–09	UEFA Champions League	Group stage (Group A)	(France) Bordeaux	4–0	1–1	2nd of 4		
2008–09	UEFA Champions League	Group stage (Group A)	(Romania) CFR Cluj	2–1	0–0	2nd of 4		
2008–09	UEFA Champions League	Group stage (Group A)	(Italy) Roma	1–0	1–3	2nd of 4		
2008–09	UEFA Champions League	Round of 16	(Italy) Juventus	1–0	2–2	3–2		
2008–09	UEFA Champions League	Quarter-final	(England) Liverpool	4–4	3–1	7–5		
2008–09	UEFA Champions League	Semi-final	(Spain) Barcelona	1–1	0–0	1–1		
2009–10	UEFA Champions League	Group stage (Group D)	(Portugal) Porto	1–0	1–0	1st of 4		
2009–10	UEFA Champions League	Group stage (Group D)	(Cyprus) APOEL	2–2	1–0	1st of 4		
2009–10	UEFA Champions League	Group stage (Group D)	(Spain) Atlético Madrid	4–0	2–2	1st of 4		
2009–10	UEFA Champions League	Round of 16	(Italy) Internazionale	0–1	1–2	1–3		
2010–11	UEFA Champions League	Group stage (Group F)	(Slovakia) Žilina	2–1	4–1	1st of 4		
2010–11	UEFA Champions League	Group stage (Group F)	(France) Marseille	2–0	0–1	1st of 4		
2010–11	UEFA Champions League	Group stage (Group F)	(Russia) Spartak Moscow	4–1	2–0	1st of 4		
2010–11	UEFA Champions League	Round of 16	(Denmark) Copenhagen	0–0	2–0	2–0		
2010–11	UEFA Champions League	Quarter-final	(England) Manchester United	0–1	1–2	1–3		
2011–12	UEFA Champions League	Group stage (Group E)	(Germany) Bayer Leverkusen	2–0	1–2	1st of 4		
2011–12	UEFA Champions League	Group stage (Group E)	(Spain) Valencia	3–0	1–1	1st of 4		
2011–12	UEFA Champions League	Group stage (Group E)	(Belgium) Genk	5–0	1–1	1st of 4		
2011–12	UEFA Champions League	Round of 16	(Italy) Napoli	4–1	1–3	5–4		
2011–12	UEFA Champions League	Quarter-final	(Portugal) Benfica	2–1	1–0	3–1		
2011–12	UEFA Champions League	Semi-final	(Spain) Barcelona	1–0	2–2	3–2		
2011–12	UEFA Champions League	Final	(Germany) Bayern Munich	1–1			(Note: Won 4–3 on penalty shoot-out.) (Note: The match was played at Allianz Arena, which is the home stadium of Bayern Munich. However, the venue was officially counted as a neutral.)	
2012–13	UEFA Super Cup		(Spain) Atlético Madrid	1–4				
2012–13	UEFA Champions League	Group stage (Group E)	(Italy) Juventus	2–2	0–3	3rd of 4		
2012–13	UEFA Champions League	Group stage (Group E)	(Denmark) Nordsjælland	6–1	4–0	3rd of 4		
2012–13	UEFA Champions League	Group stage (Group E)	(Ukraine) Shakhtar Donetsk	3–2	1–2	3rd of 4		
2012–13	FIFA Club World Cup	Semi-final	(Mexico) Monterrey	3–1			(Note: The match was played at a neutral venue, International Stadium Yokohama.)	
2012–13	FIFA Club World Cup	Final	(Brazil) Corinthians	0–1				
2012–13	UEFA Europa League	Round of 32	(Czech Republic) Sparta Prague	1–1	1–0	2–1		
2012–13	UEFA Europa League	Round of 16	(Romania) Steaua București	3–1	0–1	3–2		
2012–13	UEFA Europa League	Quarter-final	(Russia) Rubin Kazan	3–1	2–3	5–4		
2012–13	UEFA Europa League	Semi-final	(Switzerland) Basel	3–1	2–1	5–2		
2012–13	UEFA Europa League	Final	(Portugal) Benfica	2–1			(Note: The match was played at a neutral venue, Amsterdam Arena.)	
2013–14	UEFA Super Cup		(Germany) Bayern Munich	2–2			(Note: Lost 4–5 on penalty shoot-out.) (Note: The match was played at a neutral venue, Eden Arena.)	
2013–14	UEFA Champions League	Group stage (Group E)	(Switzerland) Basel	1–2	0–1	1st of 4		
2013–14	UEFA Champions League	Group stage (Group E)	(Romania) Steaua București	1–0	4–0	1st of 4		
2013–14	UEFA Champions League	Group stage (Group E)	(Germany) Schalke 04	3–0	3–0	1st of 4		
2013–14	UEFA Champions League	Round of 16	(Turkey) Galatasaray	2–0	1–1	3–1		
2013–14	UEFA Champions League	Quarter-final	(France) Paris Saint-Germain	2–0	1–3	3–3		
2013–14	UEFA Champions League	Semi-final	(Spain) Atlético Madrid	1–3	0–0	1–3		
2014–15	UEFA Champions League	Group stage (Group G)	(Germany) Schalke 04	1–1	5–0	1st of 4		
2014–15	UEFA Champions League	Group stage (Group G)	(Portugal) Sporting CP	3–1	1–0	1st of 4		
2014–15	UEFA Champions League	Group stage (Group G)	(Slovenia) Maribor	6–0	1–1	1st of 4		
2014–15	UEFA Champions League	Round of 16	(France) Paris Saint-Germain	2–2	1–1	3–3		
2015–16	UEFA Champions League	Group stage (Group G)	(Israel) Maccabi Tel Aviv	4–0	4–0	1st of 4		
2015–16	UEFA Champions League	Group stage (Group G)	(Portugal) Porto	2–0	1–2	1st of 4		
2015–16	UEFA Champions League	Group stage (Group G)	(Ukraine) Dynamo Kyiv	2–1	0–0	1st of 4		
2015–16	UEFA Champions League	Round of 16	(France) Paris Saint-Germain	1–2	1–2	2–4		
2017–18	UEFA Champions League	Group stage (Group C)	(Azerbaijan) Qarabağ	6–0	4–0	2nd of 4		
2017–18	UEFA Champions League	Group stage (Group C)	(Spain) Atlético Madrid	1–1	2–1	2nd of 4		
2017–18	UEFA Champions League	Group stage (Group C)	(Italy) Roma	3–3	0–3	2nd of 4		
2017–18	UEFA Champions League	Round of 16	(Spain) Barcelona	1–1	0–3	1–4		
2018–19	UEFA Europa League	Group stage (Group L)	(Greece) PAOK	4–0	1–0	1st of 4		
2018–19	UEFA Europa League	Group stage (Group L)	(Hungary) MOL Vidi	1–0	2–2	1st of 4		
2018–19	UEFA Europa League	Group stage (Group L)	(Belarus) BATE Borisov	3–1	1–0	1st of 4		
2018–19	UEFA Europa League	Round of 32	(Sweden) Malmö FF	3–0	2–1	5–1		
2018–19	UEFA Europa League	Round of 16	(Ukraine) Dynamo Kyiv	3–0	5–0	8–0		
2018–19	UEFA Europa League	Quarter-final	(Czech Republic) Slavia Prague	4–3	1–0	5–3		
2018–19	UEFA Europa League	Semi-final	(Germany) Eintracht Frankfurt	1–1	1–1	2–2		
2018–19	UEFA Europa League	Final	(England) Arsenal	4–1			(Note: The match was played at a neutral venue, Baku Olympic Stadium.)	
2019–20	UEFA Super Cup		(England) Liverpool	2–2			(Note: The match was played at a neutral venue, Vodafone Park.)	
2019–20	UEFA Champions League	Group stage (Group H)	(Spain) Valencia	0–1	2–2	2nd of 4		
2019–20	UEFA Champions League	Group stage (Group H)	(France) Lille	2–1	2–1	2nd of 4		
2019–20	UEFA Champions League	Group stage (Group H)	(Netherlands) Ajax	4–4	1–0	2nd of 4		
2019–20	UEFA Champions League	Round of 16	(Germany) Bayern Munich	0–3	1–4	1–7		
2020–21	UEFA Champions League	Group stage (Group E)	(Spain) Sevilla	0–0	4–0	1st of 4		
2020–21	UEFA Champions League	Group stage (Group E)	(Russia) Krasnodar	1–1	4–0	1st of 4		
2020–21	UEFA Champions League	Group stage (Group E)	(France) Rennes	3–0	2–1	1st of 4		
2020–21	UEFA Champions League	Round of 16	(Spain) Atlético Madrid	2–0	1–0	3–0		
2020–21	UEFA Champions League	Quarter-final	(Portugal) Porto	0–1	2–0	2–1	(Note: Both matches were played at Ramón Sánchez Pizjuán in Seville due to the COVID-19 pandemic travel restrictions.)	
2020–21	UEFA Champions League	Semi-final	(Spain) Real Madrid	2–0	1–1	3–1		
2020–21	UEFA Champions League	Final	(England) Manchester City	1–0			(Note: The match was played at a neutral venue, Estádio do Dragão.)	
2021–22	UEFA Super Cup		(Spain) Villarreal	1–1			(Note: Won 6–5 on penalty shoot-out.) (Note: The match was played at a neutral venue, Windsor Park.)	
2021–22	UEFA Champions League	Group stage (Group H)	(Russia) Zenit Saint Petersburg	1–0	3–3	2nd of 4	(Note: The first match was played at home, and the sixth match was played away.)	
2021–22	UEFA Champions League	Group stage (Group H)	(Italy) Juventus	4–0	0–1	2nd of 4	(Note: The second match was played away, and the fifth match was played at home.)	
2021–22	UEFA Champions League	Group stage (Group H)	(Sweden) Malmö FF	4–0	1–0	2nd of 4		
2021–22	UEFA Champions League	Round of 16	(France) Lille	2–0	2–1	4–1		
2021–22	UEFA Champions League	Quarter-final	(Spain) Real Madrid	1–3	3–2	4–5		
2021–22	FIFA Club World Cup	Semi-final	(Saudi Arabia) Al Hilal	1–0			(Note: The match was played at a neutral venue, Mohammed bin Zayed Stadium.) (Note: The competition took place between the group stage and the round of 16 of the UEFA Champions League that season.)	
2021–22	FIFA Club World Cup	Final	(Brazil) Palmeiras	2–1				
2022–23	UEFA Champions League	Group stage (Group E)	(Croatia) Dinamo Zagreb	2–1	0–1	1st of 4	(Note: The first match was played away, and the sixth match was played at home.)	
2022–23	UEFA Champions League	Group stage (Group E)	(Austria) Red Bull Salzburg	1–1	2–1	1st of 4	(Note: The second match was played at home, and the fifth match was played away.)	
2022–23	UEFA Champions League	Group stage (Group E)	(Italy) AC Milan	3–0	2–0	1st of 4		
2022–23	UEFA Champions League	Round of 16	(Germany) Borussia Dortmund	2–0	0–1	2–1		
2022–23	UEFA Champions League	Quarter-final	(Spain) Real Madrid	0–2	0–2	0–4		
2024–25	UEFA Conference League	Play-off round	(Switzerland) Servette	2–0	1–2	3–2		
2024–25	UEFA Conference League	League phase	(Belgium) Gent	4–2		1st of 36	(Note: The match was played at home.)	
2024–25	UEFA Conference League	League phase	(Greece) Panathinaikos	4–1		1st of 36	(Note: The match was played away.)	
2024–25	UEFA Conference League	League phase	(Armenia) Noah	8–0		1st of 36		
2024–25	UEFA Conference League	League phase	(Germany) 1. FC Heidenheim	2–0		1st of 36		
2024–25	UEFA Conference League	League phase	(Kazakhstan) Astana	3–1		1st of 36		
2024–25	UEFA Conference League	League phase	(Republic of Ireland) Shamrock Rovers	5–1		1st of 36		
2024–25	UEFA Conference League	Round of 16	(Denmark) Copenhagen	1–0	2–1	3–1		
2024–25	UEFA Conference League	Quarter-final	(Poland) Legia Warsaw	1–2	3–0	4–2	(Note: After the order of the legs was reversed, the first leg was played away, and the second leg was played at home.)	
2024–25	UEFA Conference League	Semi-final	(Sweden) Djurgårdens IF	1–0	4–1	5–1		
2024–25	UEFA Conference League	Final	(Spain) Real Betis	4–1			(Note: The match was played at a neutral venue, Wrocław Stadium.)	
2024–25	FIFA Club World Cup	Group stage (Group D)	(United States) Los Angeles FC	2–0		2nd of 4	(Note: The match was played at a neutral venue, Mercedes-Benz Stadium.)	
2024–25	FIFA Club World Cup	Group stage (Group D)	(Brazil) Flamengo	1–3		2nd of 4	(Note: The match was played at a neutral venue, Lincoln Financial Field.)	
2024–25	FIFA Club World Cup	Group stage (Group D)	(Tunisia) Espérance de Tunis	3–0		2nd of 4		
2024–25	FIFA Club World Cup	Round of 16	(Portugal) Benfica	4–1			(Note: The match was played at a neutral venue, Bank of America Stadium.)	
2024–25	FIFA Club World Cup	Quarter-final	(Brazil) Palmeiras	2–1				
2024–25	FIFA Club World Cup	Semi-final	(Brazil) Fluminense	2–0			(Note: The match was played at a neutral venue, MetLife Stadium.)	
2024–25	FIFA Club World Cup	Final	(France) Paris Saint-Germain	3–0				
2025–26	UEFA Champions League	League phase	(Germany) Bayern Munich	1–3		6th of 36		
2025–26	UEFA Champions League	League phase	(Portugal) Benfica	1–0		6th of 36		
2025–26	UEFA Champions League	League phase	(Netherlands) Ajax	5–1		6th of 36		
2025–26	UEFA Champions League	League phase	(Azerbaijan) Qarabağ	2–2		6th of 36		
2025–26	UEFA Champions League	League phase	(Spain) Barcelona	3–0		6th of 36		
2025–26	UEFA Champions League	League phase	(Italy) Atalanta	1–2		6th of 36		
2025–26	UEFA Champions League	League phase	(Cyprus) Pafos	1–0		6th of 36		
2025–26	UEFA Champions League	League phase	(Italy) Napoli	3–2		6th of 36		
2025–26	UEFA Champions League	Round of 16	(France) Paris Saint-Germain	0–3	2–5	2–8		

== Overall record ==
All statistics are correct as of 17 March 2026.

Including matches in UEFA Champions League, UEFA Cup / UEFA Europa League, UEFA Conference League, European Cup Winners' Cup / UEFA Cup Winners' Cup, UEFA Super Cup, Inter-Cities Fairs Cup, FIFA Club World Cup, and each competition's associated qualifying rounds.

Colour key

Positive balance (more wins)
Neutral balance (equal W/L ratio)
Negative balance (more losses)

=== By competition ===
Chelsea F.C. record in international football by competition
Competition	Apps	Games	Wins	Draws	Losses	GF	GA	GD	Win%
UEFA Champions League	20	211	109	54	48	361	199	+162	51.66
UEFA Cup / UEFA Europa League	5	32	22	5	5	64	30	+34	68.75
UEFA Conference League	1	15	13	0	2	45	12	+33	86.67
European Cup Winners' Cup / UEFA Cup Winners' Cup	5	39	23	10	6	81	28	+53	58.97
UEFA Super Cup	5	5	1	3	1	7	9	−2	20.00
Inter-Cities Fairs Cup	3	20	10	5	5	33	24	+9	50.00
FIFA Club World Cup	3	11	9	0	2	23	8	+15	81.82
Total	42	333	187	77	69	614	310	+304	56.16

=== By country ===
Chelsea F.C. record in international football by country
Country	Pld	W	D	L	GF	GA	GD	Win%
Armenia	1	1	0	0	8	0	+8	100.00
Austria	6	2	3	1	6	4	+2	33.33
Azerbaijan	3	2	1	0	12	2	+10	66.67
Belarus	2	2	0	0	4	1	+3	100.00
Belgium	9	6	1	2	19	6	+13	66.67
Brazil	5	3	0	2	7	6	+1	60.00
Bulgaria	6	6	0	0	12	1	+11	100.00
Croatia	2	1	0	1	2	2	+0	50.00
Cyprus	3	2	1	0	4	2	+2	66.67
Czech Republic	8	5	3	0	12	6	+6	62.50
Denmark	10	8	2	0	24	5	+19	80.00
England	20	8	8	4	26	19	+7	40.00
France	25	12	5	8	40	30	+10	48.00
Germany (Note: Includes West Germany.)	29	13	8	8	44	29	+15	44.83
Greece	7	5	2	0	18	3	+15	71.43
Hungary	2	1	1	0	3	2	+1	50.00
Ireland	1	1	0	0	5	1	+4	100.00
Israel	4	2	1	1	9	3	+6	50.00
Italy	31	12	8	11	48	39	+9	38.71
Kazakhstan	1	1	0	0	3	1	+2	100.00
Latvia	2	1	1	0	3	0	+3	50.00
Luxembourg	2	2	0	0	21	0	+21	100.00
Mexico	1	1	0	0	3	1	+2	100.00
Netherlands	7	4	3	0	16	7	+9	57.14
Norway	8	5	1	2	24	12	+12	62.50
Poland	2	1	0	1	4	2	+2	50.00
Portugal	17	13	1	3	28	12	+16	76.47
Romania	6	4	1	1	10	3	+7	66.67
Russia	10	7	2	1	23	9	+14	70.00
Saudi Arabia	1	1	0	0	1	0	+1	100.00
Scotland	2	2	0	0	9	3	+6	100.00
Slovakia	6	6	0	0	15	2	+13	100.00
Slovenia	2	1	1	0	7	1	+6	50.00
Spain	56	23	18	15	82	70	+12	41.07
Sweden	10	7	3	0	17	3	+14	70.00
Switzerland	8	4	0	4	10	9	+1	50.00
Tunisia	1	1	0	0	3	0	+3	100.00
Turkey	8	5	1	2	14	5	+9	62.50
Ukraine	6	4	1	1	14	5	+9	66.67
United States	1	1	0	0	2	0	+2	100.00
Yugoslavia	2	1	0	1	2	4	−2	50.00
Total (41 countries)	333	187	77	69	614	310	+304	56.16

=== By team ===
Chelsea F.C. record in international football by team
Team	Country	Pld	W	D	L	GF	GA	GD	Win%
1. FC Heidenheim	Germany	1	1	0	0	2	0	+2	100.00
1860 Munich	Germany	2	1	1	0	3	2	+1	50.00
Ajax	Netherlands	3	2	1	0	10	5	+5	66.67
Al Hilal	Saudi Arabia	1	1	0	0	1	0	+1	100.00
Anderlecht	Belgium	2	2	0	0	3	0	+3	100.00
APOEL	Cyprus	2	1	1	0	3	2	+1	50.00
Aris Thessaloniki	Greece	2	1	1	0	6	2	+4	50.00
Arsenal	England	3	2	1	0	7	3	+4	66.67
Astana	Kazakhstan	1	1	0	0	3	1	+2	100.00
Atalanta	Italy	1	0	0	1	1	2	−1	0.00
Atlético Madrid	Spain	9	4	3	2	14	11	+3	44.44
Åtvidaberg	Sweden	2	0	2	0	1	1	+0	0.00
Austria Vienna	Austria	2	0	2	0	1	1	+0	0.00
Barcelona	Spain	18	6	6	6	24	29	−5	33.33
Basel	Switzerland	4	2	0	2	6	5	+1	50.00
BATE Borisov	Belarus	2	2	0	0	4	1	+3	100.00
Bayer Leverkusen	Germany	2	1	0	1	3	2	+1	50.00
Bayern Munich	Germany	7	1	2	4	11	18	−7	14.29
Belgrade XI	Yugoslavia	2	1	0	1	2	4	−2	50.00
Benfica	Portugal	5	5	0	0	10	3	+7	100.00
Beşiktaş	Turkey	2	1	0	1	2	2	+0	50.00
Bordeaux	France	2	1	1	0	5	1	+4	50.00
Borussia Dortmund	Germany	2	1	0	1	2	1	+1	50.00
Club Brugge	Belgium	4	2	0	2	6	3	+3	50.00
CFR Cluj	Romania	2	1	1	0	2	1	+1	50.00
Copenhagen	Denmark	6	4	2	0	7	2	+5	66.67
Copenhagen XI	Denmark	2	2	0	0	7	2	+5	100.00
Corinthians	Brazil	1	0	0	1	0	1	−1	0.00
CSKA Moscow	Russia	2	2	0	0	3	0	+3	100.00
CSKA Sofia	Bulgaria	2	2	0	0	2	0	+2	100.00
Dinamo Zagreb	Croatia	2	1	0	1	2	2	+0	50.00
Djurgårdens IF	Sweden	2	2	0	0	5	1	+4	100.00
DWS	Netherlands	2	0	2	0	0	0	+0	0.00
Dynamo Kyiv	Ukraine	4	3	1	0	10	1	+9	75.00
Eintracht Frankfurt	Germany	2	0	2	0	2	2	+0	0.00
Espérance de Tunis	Tunisia	1	1	0	0	3	0	+3	100.00
Fenerbahçe	Turkey	2	1	0	1	3	2	+1	50.00
Feyenoord	Netherlands	2	2	0	0	6	2	+4	100.00
Flamengo	Brazil	1	0	0	1	1	3	−2	0.00
Fluminense	Brazil	1	1	0	0	2	0	+2	100.00
Galatasaray	Turkey	4	3	1	0	9	1	+8	75.00
Genk	Belgium	2	1	1	0	6	1	+5	50.00
Gent	Belgium	1	1	0	0	4	2	+2	100.00
Greenock Morton	Scotland	2	2	0	0	9	3	+6	100.00
Hapoel Tel Aviv	Israel	2	0	1	1	1	3	−2	0.00
Helsingborg	Sweden	2	1	1	0	1	0	+1	50.00
Hertha Berlin	Germany	2	1	0	1	3	2	+1	50.00
Internazionale	Italy	2	0	0	2	1	3	−2	0.00
Jeunesse Hautcharage	Luxembourg	2	2	0	0	21	0	+21	100.00
Juventus	Italy	6	2	2	2	9	8	+1	33.33
Krasnodar	Russia	2	1	1	0	5	1	+4	50.00
Lazio	Italy	4	2	1	1	7	3	+4	50.00
Legia Warsaw	Poland	2	1	0	1	4	2	+2	50.00
Levski Sofia	Bulgaria	4	4	0	0	10	1	+9	100.00
Lille	France	4	4	0	0	8	3	+5	100.00
Liverpool	England	11	3	6	2	14	12	+2	27.27
Los Angeles FC	United States	1	1	0	0	2	0	+2	100.00
Maccabi Tel Aviv	Israel	2	2	0	0	8	0	+8	100.00
Mallorca	Spain	2	0	1	1	1	2	−1	0.00
Malmö FF	Sweden	4	4	0	0	10	1	+9	100.00
Manchester City	England	3	3	0	0	3	0	+3	100.00
Manchester United	England	3	0	1	2	2	4	−2	0.00
Maribor	Slovenia	2	1	1	0	7	1	+6	50.00
Marseille	France	4	2	0	2	3	2	+1	50.00
Milan	Italy	7	3	3	1	10	5	+5	42.86
MOL Vidi	Hungary	2	1	1	0	3	2	+1	50.00
Monaco	France	2	0	1	1	3	5	−2	0.00
Monterrey	Mexico	1	1	0	0	3	1	+2	100.00
Napoli	Italy	3	2	0	1	8	6	+2	66.67
Noah	Armenia	1	1	0	0	8	0	+8	100.00
Nordsjælland	Denmark	2	2	0	0	10	1	+9	100.00
Olympiacos	Greece	2	1	1	0	3	0	+3	50.00
Pafos	Cyprus	1	1	0	0	1	0	+1	100.00
Palmeiras	Brazil	2	2	0	0	4	2	+2	100.00
Panathinaikos	Greece	1	1	0	0	4	1	+3	100.00
PAOK	Greece	2	2	0	0	5	0	+5	100.00
Paris Saint-Germain	France	11	3	3	5	16	18	−2	27.27
Porto	Portugal	10	6	1	3	14	8	+6	60.00
Qarabağ	Azerbaijan	3	2	1	0	12	2	+10	66.67
Real Betis	Spain	5	4	0	1	13	4	+9	80.00
Real Madrid	Spain	9	4	2	3	11	12	−1	44.44
Red Bull Salzburg	Austria	2	1	1	0	3	2	+1	50.00
Rennes	France	2	2	0	0	5	1	+4	100.00
Roma	Italy	6	2	2	2	9	10	−1	33.33
Rosenborg	Norway	2	1	1	0	5	1	+4	50.00
Rubin Kazan	Russia	2	1	0	1	5	4	+1	50.00
Schalke 04	Germany	6	4	2	0	14	1	+13	66.67
Servette	Switzerland	2	1	0	1	3	2	+1	50.00
Sevilla	Spain	2	1	1	0	4	0	+4	50.00
Shakhtar Donetsk	Ukraine	2	1	0	1	4	4	+0	50.00
Shamrock Rovers	Ireland	1	1	0	0	5	1	+4	100.00
Skonto	Latvia	2	1	1	0	3	0	+3	50.00
Slavia Prague	Czech Republic	2	2	0	0	5	3	+2	100.00
Slovan Bratislava	Slovakia	2	2	0	0	4	0	+4	100.00
Sparta Prague	Czech Republic	4	2	2	0	3	1	+2	50.00
Spartak Moscow	Russia	2	2	0	0	6	1	+5	100.00
Sporting CP	Portugal	2	2	0	0	4	1	+3	100.00
St. Gallen	Switzerland	2	1	0	1	1	2	−1	50.00
Steaua București	Romania	4	3	0	1	8	2	+6	75.00
VfB Stuttgart	Germany	3	2	1	0	2	0	+2	66.67
Tromsø	Norway	2	1	0	1	9	4	+5	50.00
Valencia	Spain	8	3	4	1	11	7	+4	37.50
Vålerenga	Norway	2	2	0	0	6	2	+4	100.00
Vicenza	Italy	2	1	0	1	3	2	+1	50.00
Viking	Norway	2	1	0	1	4	5	−1	50.00
Viktoria Žižkov	Czech Republic	2	1	1	0	4	2	+2	50.00
Villarreal	Spain	1	0	1	0	1	1	+0	0.00
Werder Bremen	Germany	2	1	0	1	2	1	+1	50.00
Wiener Sport-Club	Austria	2	1	0	1	2	1	+1	50.00
Zaragoza	Spain	2	1	0	1	3	4	−1	50.00
Zenit Saint Petersburg	Russia	2	1	1	0	4	3	+1	50.00
Žilina	Slovakia	4	4	0	0	11	2	+9	100.00
Total (112 teams)	41 countries	333	187	77	69	614	310	+304	56.16

== All-time top goalscorers ==
All statistics are correct as of 17 March 2026.

Including matches in UEFA Champions League, UEFA Cup / UEFA Europa League, UEFA Conference League, European Cup Winners' Cup / UEFA Cup Winners' Cup, UEFA Super Cup, Inter-Cities Fairs Cup, FIFA Club World Cup, and each competition's associated qualifying rounds.

Key

- UCL = UEFA Champions League
- UEL = UEFA Cup / UEFA Europa League
- UEC = UEFA Conference League
- CWC = European Cup Winners' Cup / UEFA Cup Winners' Cup
- USC = UEFA Super Cup
- IFC = Inter-Cities Fairs Cup
- FWC = FIFA Club World Cup

Rank	Player	Chelsea career	UCL	UEL	UEC	CWC	USC	IFC	FWC	Total
1	(Ivory Coast) Didier Drogba	2004–2012, 2014–2015	36	0	0	0	0	0	0	36
2	(England) Frank Lampard	2001–2014	23	2	0	0	0	0	0	25
3	(Spain) Fernando Torres	2011–2014	10	6	0	0	1	0	1	18
3	(France) Olivier Giroud	2018–2021	6	11	0	0	1	0	0	18
5	(England) Peter Osgood	1964–1974, 1978–1979	0	0	0	12	0	4	0	16
6	(England) John Terry	1998–2017	10	3	0	0	0	0	0	13
6	(Brazil) Willian	2013–2020	10	3	0	0	0	0	0	13
8	(Norway) Tore André Flo	1997–2000	8	0	0	4	0	0	0	12
8	(France) Nicolas Anelka	2008–2012	12	0	0	0	0	0	0	12
8	(Belgium) Eden Hazard	2012–2019	8	3	0	0	1	0	0	12
