= 2025 FIFA Club World Cup final =

Soccer match in East Rutherford, New Jersey

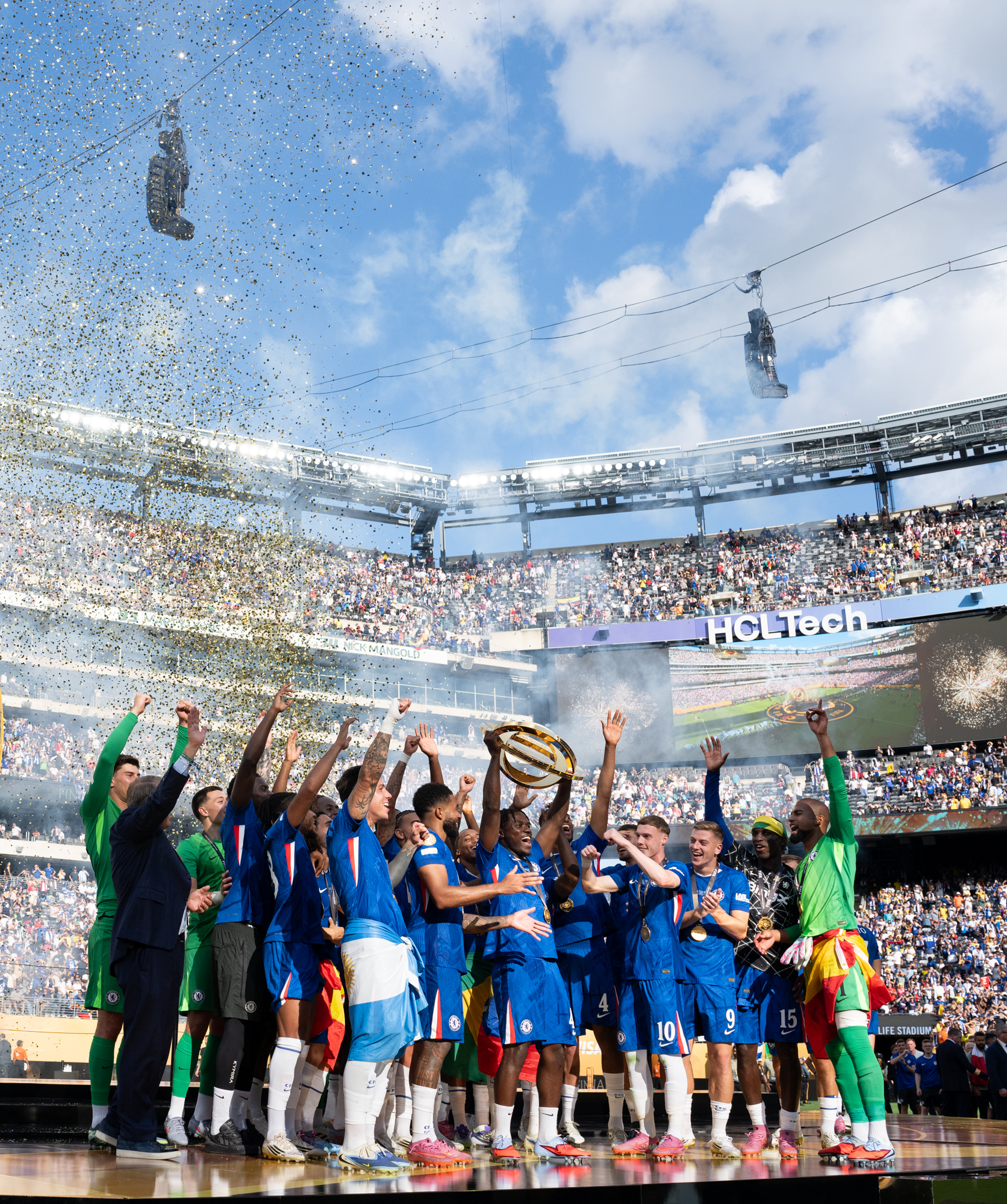
- Chelsea squad lifting the Club World Cup trophy
- Event: 2025 FIFA Club World Cup
Chelsea	Paris Saint-Germain
(The Football Association)	(French Football Federation)
3	0
- Date: July 13, 2025
- Venue: MetLife Stadium, East Rutherford, New Jersey
- Man of the Match: Cole Palmer (Chelsea)
- Referee: Alireza Faghani (Australia)
- Attendance: 81,118
- Weather: Mostly cloudy 83 °F (28 °C); 65% humidity

The 2025 FIFA Club World Cup final was the final match of the 2025 FIFA Club World Cup, the 21st edition of the premier competition for men's club soccer teams organized by FIFA. The match was played at MetLife Stadium at the Meadowlands Sports Complex in East Rutherford, New Jersey, near New York City, on July 13, 2025. It was contested between English club Chelsea and French club Paris Saint-Germain. This final was the first since 2000 to be contested by two teams from the same confederation—the only previous Club World Cup to feature multiple teams from the same association or country—and the first ever to feature two European teams.

Chelsea won the match 3–0 for their second FIFA Club World Cup title and first under the new format. Meanwhile, PSG's loss cost them the opportunity to become the first team to achieve a septuple, since it won the continental treble before the tournament and won the UEFA Super Cup, FIFA Intercontinental Cup, and French Super Cup, respectively, after the tournament.

== Teams ==
Team	Confederation	Qualification for tournament	Previous FIFA Club World Cup finals (bold indicates winners)
(The Football Association) Chelsea	UEFA	Winners of the 2020–21 UEFA Champions League	2 (2012, **2021**)
(French Football Federation) Paris Saint-Germain	UEFA	Second-best ranked eligible team in the UEFA four-year ranking	None

== Venue ==
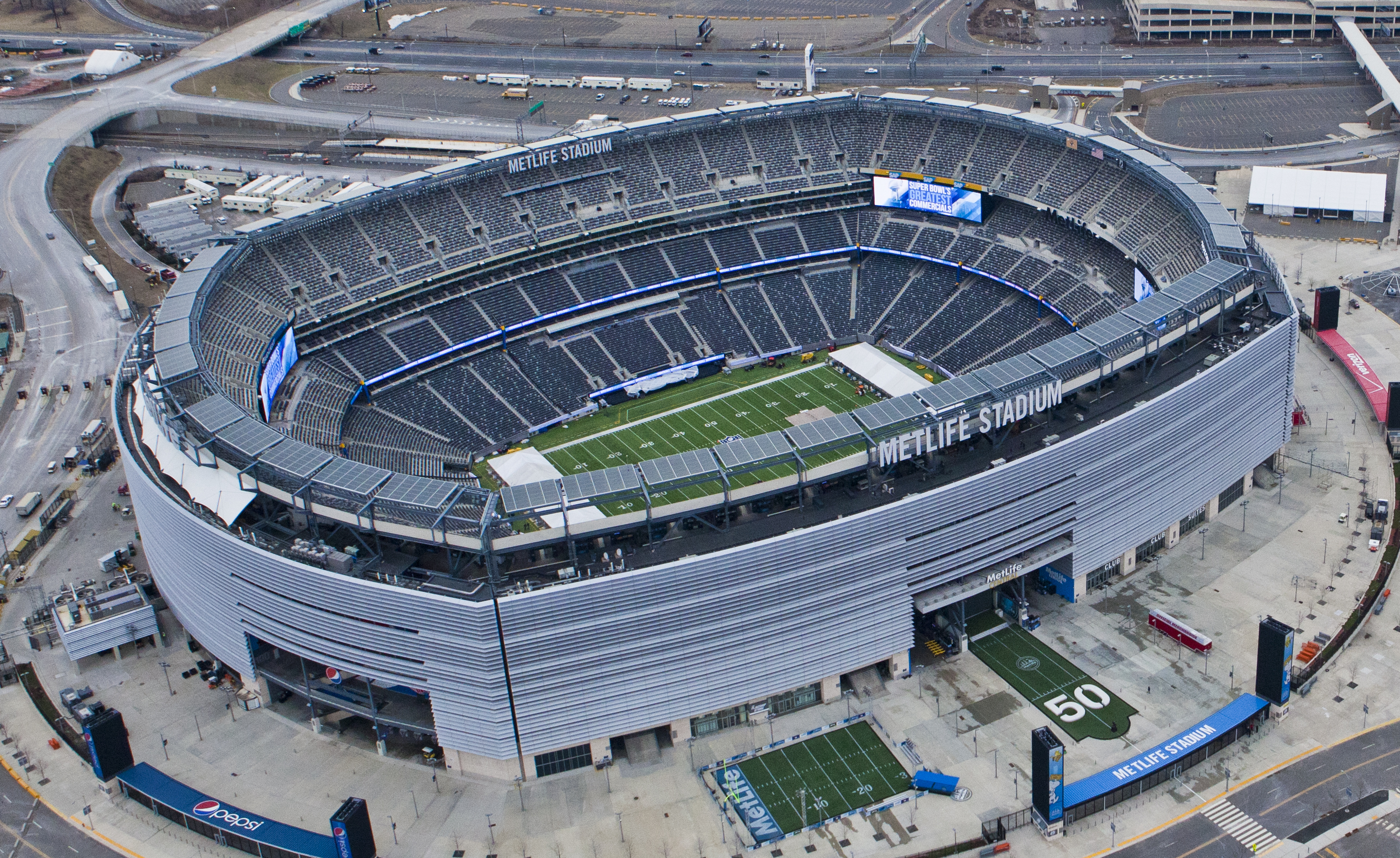
Aerial view of MetLife Stadium in 2014, the host venue for the final

The host venue for the final was MetLife Stadium in East Rutherford, New Jersey, 5 miles (8.0 km) west of New York City. FIFA announced the final's host venue on September 28, 2024. MetLife Stadium is also scheduled to host the FIFA World Cup final in July 2026. The stadium had primarily been used by the New York Giants and New York Jets of the National Football League (NFL) since it opened in 2009. It had a listed capacity of 82,500 seats and previously hosted Super Bowl XLVIII in 2014 and the Copa América Centenario final in 2016.

== Entertainment ==
On June 9, 2025, FIFA and Global Citizen announced the headliners for the halftime show which included J Balvin, Doja Cat, Tems, Coldplay and Emmanuel Kelly (later added on July 12), a prelude to the halftime show for the 2026 FIFA World Cup final. In addition, Robbie Williams and Laura Pausini performed a pregame show at the stadium.

The setlist of the halftime show was as follows:

1. "Mi Gente" (performed by J Balvin)
2. "Love Me JeJe" (performed by Tems)
3. "Reggaetón" (performed by J Balvin)
4. "Woman" (performed by Doja Cat)
5. "A Sky Full of Stars" (performed by Coldplay and Emmanuel Kelly)

== Route to the final ==
(The Football Association) Chelsea		Team	(French Football Federation) Paris Saint-Germain	
Opponent	Result	Group stage	Opponent	Result
(United States Soccer Federation) Los Angeles FC	2–0	Matchday 1	(Royal Spanish Football Federation) Atlético Madrid	4–0
(Brazilian Football Confederation) Flamengo	1–3	Matchday 2	(Brazilian Football Confederation) Botafogo	0–1
(Tunisian Football Federation) Espérance de Tunis	3–0	Matchday 3	(United States Soccer Federation) Seattle Sounders FC	2–0
**Group D runners-up**: Pos / Team / Pld / Pts; 1 / (Brazil) Flamengo / 3 / **7**; **2** / (England) Chelsea / **3** / **6**; 3 / (Tunisia) Espérance de Tunis / 3 / **3**; 4 / (United States) Los Angeles FC / 3 / **1**; Source: FIFA		Final standings	**Group B winners**: Pos / Team / Pld / Pts; **1** / (France) Paris Saint-Germain / **3** / **6**; 2 / (Brazil) Botafogo / 3 / **6**; 3 / (Spain) Atlético Madrid / 3 / **6**; 4 / (United States) Seattle Sounders FC / 3 / **0**; Source: FIFA	
Opponent	Result	Knockout stage	Opponent	Result
(Portuguese Football Federation) Benfica	4–1 (a.e.t.)	Round of 16	(United States Soccer Federation) Inter Miami CF	4–0
(Brazilian Football Confederation) Palmeiras	2–1	Quarterfinals	(German Football Association) Bayern Munich	2–0
(Brazilian Football Confederation) Fluminense	2–0	Semifinals	(Royal Spanish Football Federation) Real Madrid	4–0

=== Chelsea ===
Chelsea qualified for the tournament as the winners of the 2020–21 UEFA Champions League. They entered the tournament having recently won the 2024–25 UEFA Conference League, becoming the first club to win all four major European trophies and all three of the current European competitions. They were drawn into group D alongside Flamengo, Los Angeles FC, and Espérance de Tunis. In the opening match, Chelsea beat Los Angeles FC 2–0, with goals coming from Pedro Neto and Enzo Fernández. Chelsea were defeated 3–1 by Flamengo in the second match, a result that meant Chelsea would at best finish second in the group. In the final game, Chelsea were up against fellow knockout stage hopefuls Espérance de Tunis. Chelsea won 3–0, with goals from Tosin Adarabioyo and Tyrique George, alongside new signing Liam Delap's debut goal. The result secured Chelsea's place in the knockout stage as the second placed team in Group D.

In the round of 16, Chelsea faced Benfica, the winners of Group C. Chelsea gained the lead via a free-kick goal from captain Reece James, before the match was halted due to lightning for nearly two hours. A late Ángel Di María penalty sent the game to extra time, where Chelsea goals from Christopher Nkunku, Pedro Neto, and Kiernan Dewsbury-Hall saw the Blues come out 4–1 winners. In the quarterfinals, Chelsea faced Palmeiras in a rematch of the 2021 FIFA Club World Cup final, which Chelsea had previously won 2–1. The result would be identical. Cole Palmer opened the scoring with his first goal of the tournament, before Estêvão Willian scored the equalizer in what would be his final appearance for Palmeiras before moving to Chelsea. Chelsea's winner came via an own goal by Palmeiras goalkeeper Weverton. In the semifinals, Chelsea faced another Brazilian side Fluminense, the last remaining non-European team in the tournament. Chelsea won 2–0 with a brace by newly signed and registered João Pedro, a product of the Fluminense academy.

=== Paris Saint-Germain ===
Paris Saint-Germain qualified for the tournament via the UEFA ranking pathway as one of the best ranked European teams. They entered the tournament as the reigning European champions, having recently won the 2024–25 UEFA Champions League. They were drawn into group B alongside Atlético Madrid, Botafogo, and Seattle Sounders FC. In the opening match, Paris Saint-Germain beat Atlético Madrid 4–0 with two first half goals from Fabián Ruiz and Vitinha to go along with two late goals from Senny Mayulu and Lee Kang-in. In the second match, Paris Saint-Germain faced Botafogo, the reigning South American champions. In an extraordinary upset, the South Americans would win 1–0, with the only goal scored by Igor Jesus. In the third game, Paris Saint-Germain faced Seattle Sounders FC at their home stadium, winning 2–0 with goals from Khvicha Kvaratskhelia and Achraf Hakimi. The result secured Paris Saint-Germain's place in the knockout stage as the winner of group B, ahead of both Botafogo and Atlético Madrid — both of which also had six points — on head-to-head goal difference.

In the round of 16, Paris Saint-Germain faced Inter Miami CF, an American team featuring former Paris Saint-Germain player Lionel Messi. Paris Saint-Germain won with a comfortable scoreline of 4–0, with brace from João Neves and a goal from Hakimi to go with a Miami own goal. In the quarterfinals, Paris Saint-Germain faced Bayern Munich in a rematch of the 2020 UEFA Champions League final, which Bayern had won 1–0. This time, Paris Saint-Germain would win 2–0 with goals from Désiré Doué and Ousmane Dembélé. The match also saw Bayern player Jamal Musiala getting seriously injured due to a clash with Paris Saint-Germain goalkeeper Gianluigi Donnarumma, while two Paris Saint-Germain players — Willian Pacho and Lucas Hernández — were sent off and earned two match suspensions each. In the semifinals, Paris Saint-Germain faced Real Madrid featuring former Paris Saint-Germain player Kylian Mbappe. Once again, Paris Saint-Germain would win comfortably, 4–0, with a brace from Ruiz and a Dembélé goal in the first half to go along with a late Gonçalo Ramos goal.

== Pre-match ==
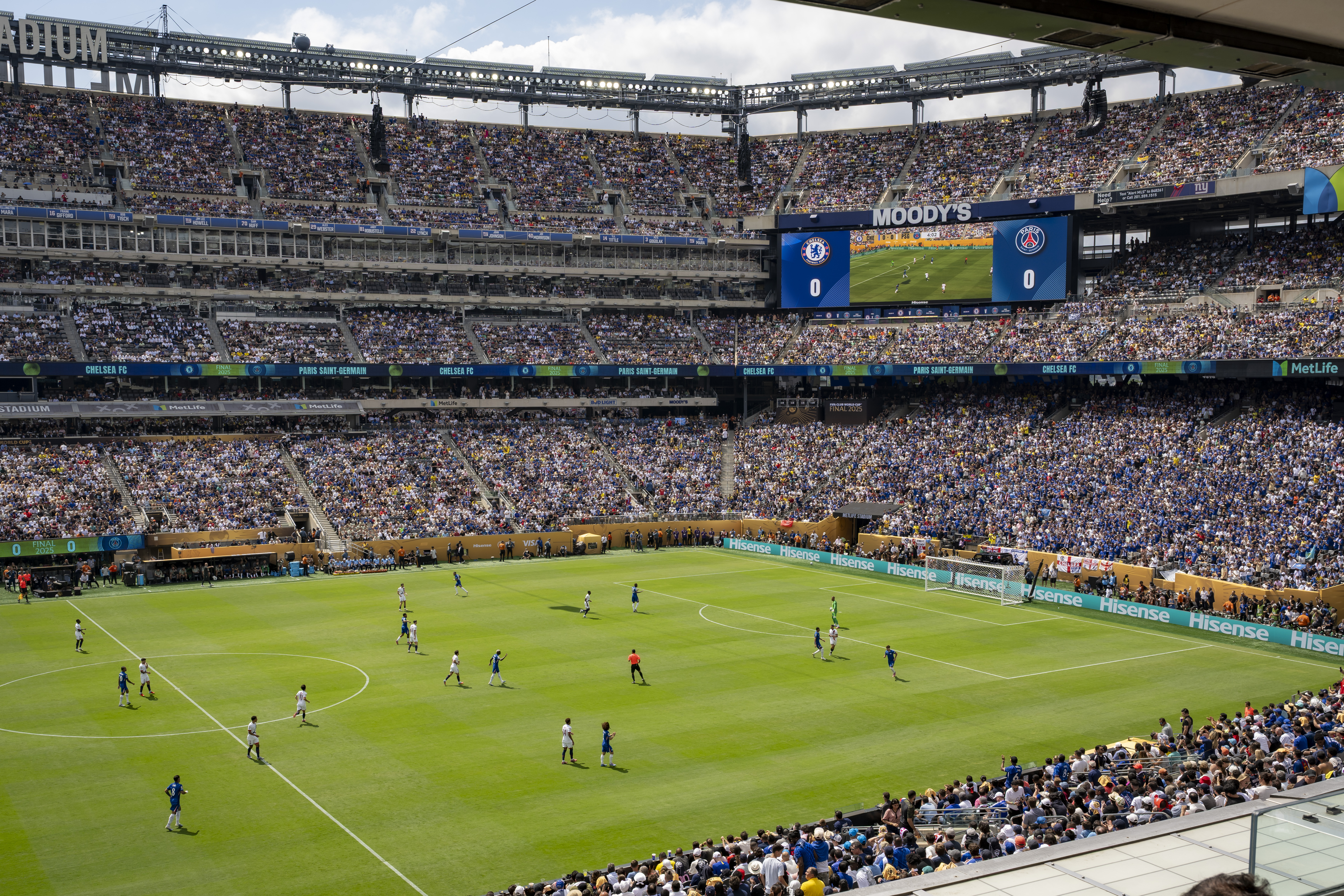
View of the match during the first half

Present at the match was U.S. president Donald Trump, who was accompanied by First Lady Melania Trump, as well as FIFA president Gianni Infantino and his partner.

== Match ==
=== Summary ===
The defending UEFA Champions League champions Paris Saint-Germain were heavily favored by bookmakers before the final. Chelsea scored first in the 22nd minute, after Cole Palmer's low shot reached in the far left corner off an assist from Malo Gusto. Eight minutes later, Palmer scored a second goal, once again low into the same far left corner. He became the first English player to score two goals in a Club World Cup final. Chelsea's press produced a third goal in the 43rd minute, which Palmer assisted and João Pedro scored lifting the ball over the advancing goalkeeper. PSG finished the game with 10 players after João Neves received a straight red card for pulling Marc Cucurella's hair in the 85th minute. With the victory, Chelsea had won every international competition it had entered in history.

=== Details ===
July 13, 2025
3:00 pm EDT

Chelsea (The Football Association)	3–0	(French Football Federation) Paris Saint-Germain
Palmer 22', 30'; João Pedro 43'	Report

MetLife Stadium, East Rutherford
Attendance: 81,118
Referee: Alireza Faghani (Australia)

**Chelsea**	**Paris Saint-Germain**

GK	1	(Spain) Robert Sánchez
RB	27	(France) Malo Gusto	(yellow card) 40'
CB	23	(England) Trevoh Chalobah
CB	6	(England) Levi Colwill	(yellow card) 81'
LB	3	(Spain) Marc Cucurella
CM	24	(England) Reece James (c)		(substituted off) 77'
CM	25	(Ecuador) Moisés Caicedo	(yellow card) 36'
RW	10	(England) Cole Palmer
AM	8	(Argentina) Enzo Fernández		(substituted off) 61'
LW	7	(Portugal) Pedro Neto	(yellow card) 34'	(substituted off) 77'
CF	20	(Brazil) João Pedro		(substituted off) 67'
Substitutes:
GK	12	(Denmark) Filip Jörgensen
GK	39	(Belgium) Mike Penders
GK	44	(United States) Gabriel Slonina
DF	4	(England) Tosin Adarabioyo
DF	19	(France) Mamadou Sarr
DF	30	(Argentina) Aarón Anselmino
DF	34	(England) Josh Acheampong
MF	17	(Brazil) Andrey Santos		(substituted on) 61'
MF	22	(England) Kiernan Dewsbury-Hall		(substituted on) 77'
MF	45	(Belgium) Roméo Lavia
FW	9	(England) Liam Delap		(substituted on) 67'
FW	15	(Senegal) Nicolas Jackson
FW	18	(France) Christopher Nkunku		(substituted on) 77'
FW	32	(England) Tyrique George
FW	38	(Spain) Marc Guiu
Manager:
(Italy) Enzo Maresca

GK	1	(Italy) Gianluigi Donnarumma
RB	2	(Morocco) Achraf Hakimi		(substituted off) 73'
CB	5	(Brazil) Marquinhos (c)
CB	4	(Brazil) Lucas Beraldo
LB	25	(Portugal) Nuno Mendes	(yellow card) 90+4'
DM	17	(Portugal) Vitinha
CM	87	(Portugal) João Neves	(red card) 85'
CM	8	(Spain) Fabián Ruiz		(substituted off) 73'
RF	14	(France) Désiré Doué		(substituted off) 73'
CF	10	(France) Ousmane Dembélé	(yellow card) 87'
LF	7	(Georgia (country)) Khvicha Kvaratskhelia		(substituted off) 58'
Substitutes:
GK	39	(Russia) Matvey Safonov
GK	80	(Spain) Arnau Tenas
DF	3	(France) Presnel Kimpembe
DF	43	(France) Noham Kamara
MF	19	(South Korea) Lee Kang-in
MF	20	(Brazil) Gabriel Moscardo
MF	24	(France) Senny Mayulu		(substituted on) 73'
MF	33	(France) Warren Zaïre-Emery		(substituted on) 73'
FW	9	(Portugal) Gonçalo Ramos		(substituted on) 73'
FW	29	(France) Bradley Barcola		(substituted on) 58'
FW	49	(France) Ibrahim Mbaye
Manager:
(Spain) Luis Enrique

Man of the Match:
Cole Palmer (Chelsea)

Assistant referees:
Anton Shchetinin (Australia)
Ashley Beecham (Australia)
Fourth official:
Facundo Tello (Argentina)
Reserve assistant referee:
Gabriel Chade (Argentina)
Video assistant referee:
Bastian Dankert (Germany)
Assistant video assistant referee:
Tatiana Guzmán (Nicaragua)
Support video assistant referee:
Ivan Bebek (Croatia)

**Match rules**

- 90 minutes
- 30 minutes of extra time if necessary
- Penalty shoot-out if scores still level
- Maximum of fifteen named substitutes
- Maximum of five substitutions, with a sixth allowed in extra time
- Maximum of three substitution opportunities, with a fourth allowed in extra time
- Maximum of one concussion substitution, granting the opposition an additional standalone substitution

=== Statistics ===
Match statistics
Statistic	Chelsea	Paris Saint-Germain
Goals scored	3	0
Total shots	9	9
Shots on target	5	6
Ball possession	34%	66%
Corner kicks	3	5
Fouls committed	15	12
Offsides	3	2
Yellow cards	4	2
Red cards	0	1

== See also ==
- Chelsea F.C. in international football
- Paris Saint-Germain FC in international football
- 2024–25 Chelsea F.C. season
- 2024–25 Paris Saint-Germain FC season
- 2026 FIFA World Cup final – played in the same venue a year later for the FIFA World Cup
