= 2021 FIFA Club World Cup final =

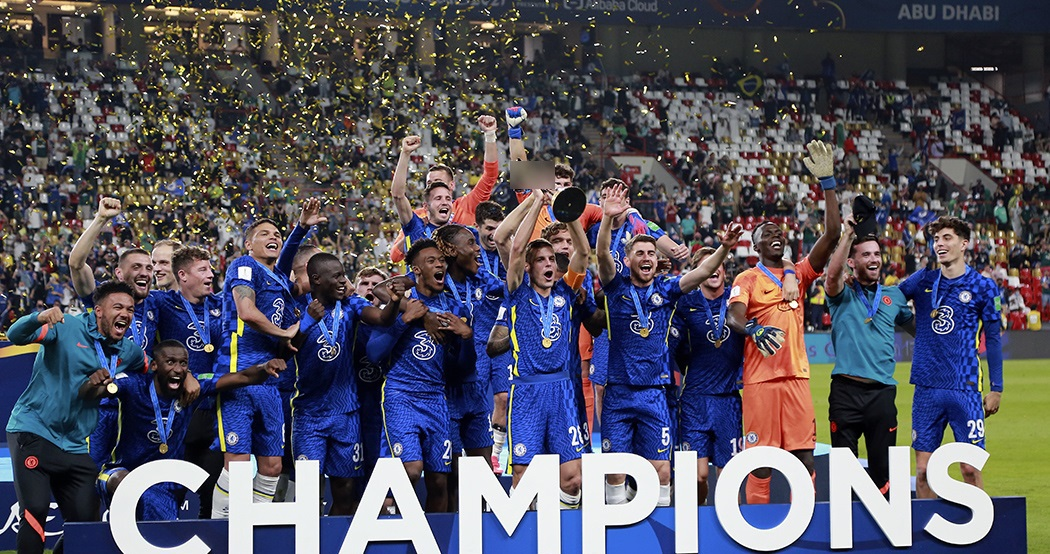
- Chelsea team members after becoming champions.
- Event: 2021 FIFA Club World Cup
Chelsea	Palmeiras
(England)	(Brazil)
2	1
- After extra time
- Date: 12 February 2022
- Venue: Mohammed bin Zayed Stadium, Abu Dhabi
- Man of the Match: Antonio Rüdiger (Chelsea)
- Referee: Chris Beath (Australia)
- Attendance: 32,871
- Weather: Clear night 23 °C (73 °F); 62% humidity

The 2021 FIFA Club World Cup final was the final match of the 2021 FIFA Club World Cup, an international club football tournament hosted by the United Arab Emirates. It was the 18th final of the FIFA Club World Cup, a FIFA-organised tournament between the club champions from each of the six continental confederations, as well as the host nation's league champions.

The final was contested by English club Chelsea, representing UEFA as the reigning champions of the UEFA Champions League, and Brazilian club Palmeiras, representing CONMEBOL as the reigning champions of the Copa Libertadores.

The match was played at the Mohammed bin Zayed Stadium in Abu Dhabi on 12 February 2022. The tournament was originally planned to take place in late 2021 in Japan, but was moved to February 2022 in the United Arab Emirates due to the impact of the COVID-19 pandemic.

Chelsea won the match 2–1 after extra time for their first FIFA Club World Cup title.

== Teams ==
In the following table, the finals until 2005 were in the FIFA Club World Championship era, and since 2006 in the FIFA Club World Cup era.

Team	Confederation	Qualification for tournament	Previous club world championship finals (bold indicates winners)
(England) Chelsea	UEFA	Winners of the 2020–21 UEFA Champions League	FCWC: 1 (2012)
(Brazil) Palmeiras	CONMEBOL	Winners of the 2021 Copa Libertadores	IC: 1 (1999)

Note: On 27 October 2017, FIFA officially recognised all the champions of the Intercontinental Cup as club world champions, in equal status to the FIFA Club World Cup.

- IC: Intercontinental Cup (1960–2004)
- FCWC: FIFA Club World Cup finals (2000, 2005–present)

== Background ==
Chelsea reached their second FIFA Club World Cup Final in two appearances, having done so previously in 2012, which they lost to Corinthians. Chelsea were looking to win their second title of the season, after the 2021 UEFA Super Cup.

Palmeiras were competing in the FIFA Club World Cup for the second consecutive time, having finished fourth in 2020. They reached the final for the first time after defeating Al Ahly, who had previously defeated them in the third place playoff in 2020.

This was the fourth FIFA Club World Cup Final to be played between English and Brazilian clubs, after 2005, 2012 and 2019, with only the latter being won by the English club.

== Route to the final ==
(England) Chelsea		Team	(Brazil) Palmeiras	
Opponent	Result	2021 FIFA Club World Cup	Opponent	Result
(Saudi Arabia) Al Hilal	1–0	Semi-finals	(Egypt) Al Ahly	2–0

=== Chelsea ===
Chelsea qualified for the tournament as the champions of the UEFA Champions League, having defeated fellow English club Manchester City in the final. Due to their participation in the Club World Cup, two of their Premier League fixtures were rescheduled.

As European champions, Chelsea received a bye to the semi-finals, where they faced Asian champions Al Hilal from Saudi Arabia. The Blues won the match 1–0; Romelu Lukaku scored the only goal of the game in the 32nd minute.

=== Palmeiras ===
Palmeiras entered the tournament as the winners of the Copa Libertadores, defeating another Brazilian club Flamengo after extra time in the final, which took place a few days before the draw for the Club World Cup.

Palmeiras too entered the Club World Cup in the semi-finals stage, where they played African champions Al Ahly of Egypt. Palmeiras won the match 2–0 with goals from Raphael Veiga and Dudu, their first goals in the Club World Cup.

== Match ==
=== Details ===
12 February 2022
20:30 GST

Chelsea (England)	2–1 (a.e.t.)	(Brazil) Palmeiras
Lukaku 54'; Havertz 117' (pen.)	Report	Veiga 64' (pen.)

Mohammed bin Zayed Stadium, Abu Dhabi
Attendance: 32,871
Referee: Chris Beath (Australia)

**Chelsea**	**Palmeiras**

GK	16	(Senegal) Édouard Mendy
CB	4	(Denmark) Andreas Christensen		(substituted off) 91'
CB	6	(Brazil) Thiago Silva
CB	2	(Germany) Antonio Rüdiger
RM	28	(Spain) César Azpilicueta (c)
CM	7	(France) N'Golo Kanté
CM	8	(Croatia) Mateo Kovačić		(substituted off) 91'
LM	20	(England) Callum Hudson-Odoi		(substituted off) 76'
RF	19	(England) Mason Mount		(substituted off) 31'
CF	9	(Belgium) Romelu Lukaku		(substituted off) 76'
LF	29	(Germany) Kai Havertz	(yellow card) 118'
Substitutes:
GK	1	(Spain) Kepa Arrizabalaga
GK	13	(England) Marcus Bettinelli
DF	3	(Spain) Marcos Alonso
DF	14	(England) Trevoh Chalobah
DF	31	(France) Malang Sarr		(substituted on) 91'
MF	5	(Italy) Jorginho
MF	17	(Spain) Saúl		(substituted on) 76'
MF	18	(England) Ross Barkley
MF	22	(Morocco) Hakim Ziyech		(substituted on) 91'
MF	23	(Brazil) Kenedy
FW	10	(United States) Christian Pulisic		(substituted on) 31'
FW	11	(Germany) Timo Werner		(substituted on) 76'
Manager:
(Germany) Thomas Tuchel

GK	21	(Brazil) Weverton
RB	2	(Brazil) Marcos Rocha		(substituted off) 118'
CB	15	(Paraguay) Gustavo Gómez (c)
CB	13	(Brazil) Luan	(yellow card) 115' (red card) 120+6'
LB	22	(Uruguay) Joaquín Piquerez
CM	28	(Brazil) Danilo
CM	8	(Brazil) Zé Rafael		(substituted off) 60'
RW	7	(Brazil) Dudu		(substituted off) 103'
AM	23	(Brazil) Raphael Veiga		(substituted off) 78'
LW	14	(Brazil) Gustavo Scarpa
CF	10	(Brazil) Rony		(substituted off) 77'
Substitutes:
GK	31	(Brazil) Mateus
GK	42	(Brazil) Marcelo Lomba
DF	4	(Chile) Benjamín Kuscevic
DF	6	(Brazil) Jorge
DF	12	(Brazil) Mayke
DF	26	(Brazil) Murilo Cerqueira
MF	20	(Colombia) Eduard Atuesta	(yellow card) 116'	(substituted on) 78'
MF	30	(Brazil) Jailson		(substituted on) 60'
FW	11	(Brazil) Wesley	(yellow card) 105'	(substituted on) 77'
FW	16	(Brazil) Deyverson		(substituted on) 118'
FW	19	(Brazil) Breno Lopes
FW	29	(Brazil) Rafael Navarro		(substituted on) 103'
Manager:
(Portugal) Abel Ferreira			(yellow card) 120+1'

Man of the Match:
Antonio Rüdiger (Chelsea)

Assistant referees:
Anton Shchetinin (Australia)
Ashley Beecham (Australia)
Fourth official:
Mustapha Ghorbal (Algeria)
Reserve assistant referee:
Abdelhak Etchiali (Algeria)
Video assistant referee:
Massimiliano Irrati (Italy)
Assistant video assistant referees:
Nicolás Gallo (Colombia)
Mokrane Gourari (Algeria)
Ammar Al-Jeneibi (United Arab Emirates)

**Match rules**

- 90 minutes.
- 30 minutes of extra time if necessary.
- Penalty shoot-out if scores still level.
- Maximum of twelve named substitutes.
- Maximum of five substitutions, with a sixth allowed in extra time. (Note: Each team was given only three opportunities to make substitutions, with a fourth opportunity in extra time, excluding substitutions made at half-time, before the start of extra time and at half-time in extra time.)
