= 2012 FIFA Club World Cup final =

- Match programme cover
- Event: 2012 FIFA Club World Cup
Corinthians	Chelsea
(Brazil)	(England)
1	0
- Date: 16 December 2012
- Venue: International Stadium Yokohama, Yokohama
- Referee: Cüneyt Çakır (Turkey)
- Attendance: 68,275
- Weather: Clear night 13 °C (55 °F); 42% humidity

The 2012 FIFA Club World Cup final was the final match of the 2012 FIFA Club World Cup, an association football tournament hosted in Japan. It was the ninth final of the FIFA Club World Cup, a FIFA-organised tournament between the winners of the six continental confederations as well as the host nation's league champions.

The final was contested between CONMEBOL winners Corinthians and UEFA winners Chelsea, and took place at the International Stadium Yokohama in Yokohama on 16 December 2012. Corinthians defeated Chelsea 1–0 after a header from Paolo Guerrero, which meant Corinthians won their second FIFA Club World Cup, then known as FIFA Club World Championship, twelve years after winning their first in 2000. The match kicked-off at 19:30 JST and was officiated by Turkish referee Cüneyt Çakır.

Both clubs entered the competition after winning their respective club football competitions. Corinthians won the 2012 Copa Libertadores, following a 2–0 win against Boca Juniors in the final, while Chelsea won the 2011–12 UEFA Champions League, having defeated Bayern Munich 4–3 in a penalty shoot-out, after being held 1–1 in normal time. This was Corinthians's second time competing and winning the tournament (also becoming the last South American and non-European team doing it), after having won the competition in 2000, with a 4–3 penalty shoot-out win over Vasco da Gama.

== Background ==
The International Stadium Yokohama had hosted the FIFA Club World Cup finals five times, with the 2009 and 2010 finals being held at the Zayed Sports City Stadium in Abu Dhabi, United Arab Emirates. Brazilian sides have been the most dominant side of any other South American teams, with the first dating back in 2000, where Corinthians won the competition for the first time, then known as FIFA Club World Championship, where they beat Vasco da Gama 4–3 in a penalty shoot-out. This was followed by wins from São Paulo, who beat Liverpool 1–0 and Internacional with the same scoreline against Barcelona. At the time, Manchester United were the only English team to have won the competition, in 2008, when they defeated Ecuadorian side LDU Quito 1–0.

== Route to the final ==
Both clubs received byes from the play-off rounds and the quarter-finals.

(Brazil) Corinthians	Team	(England) Chelsea
CONMEBOL	Confederation	UEFA
Winner of the 2012 Copa Libertadores	Qualification	Winner of the 2011–12 UEFA Champions League
Bye	Play-off round	Bye
Bye	Quarter-finals	Bye
1–0 (Egypt) Al-Ahly (Guerrero 30')	Semi-finals	3–1 (Mexico) Monterrey (Mata 17', Torres 46', Chávez 48' o.g.)

=== Corinthians ===
Corinthians advanced to the final after a 1–0 win against Al-Ahly on 12 December. Paolo Guerrero scored the winning goal with a header after thirty minutes.

=== Chelsea ===
Chelsea took on Monterrey on 13 December, winning 3–1 after goals from Juan Mata, Fernando Torres, and a Dárvin Chávez own goal. Aldo de Nigris scored a consolation goal for Monterrey in stoppage time.

== Pre-match ==
=== Venue ===
The International Stadium Yokohama has been the venue for the FIFA Club World Cup since 2005. It was built and opened in 1998, and is the home ground of Yokohama F. Marinos, who plays in the J. League, the highest division of the Japanese league system. The venue has been used five times in the previous FIFA Club World Championship and Club World Cup finals, in 2005, 2006, 2007 and 2008, as well as 2011.

=== Match ball ===
The official match ball for the final was the Adidas Cafusa, provided by German sports equipment company Adidas. It was used throughout the tournament and also at the 2013 FIFA Confederations Cup.

=== Officials ===
Cüneyt Çakır, representing Turkey and UEFA, was selected as the referee of the final. He was first listed as an international referee in 2006, and had earlier taken charge of his first FIFA Club World Cup match, the first quarter-final match between Ulsan Hyundai and Monterrey on 9 December 2012. Çakır was assisted by Bahattin Duran and Tarık Ongun, while the fourth and fifth officials were Alireza Faghani and Hassan Kamranifar, representing the Islamic Republic of Iran and one of the two AFC representatives in the competition, alongside Nawaf Shukralla of Bahrain.

== Match ==
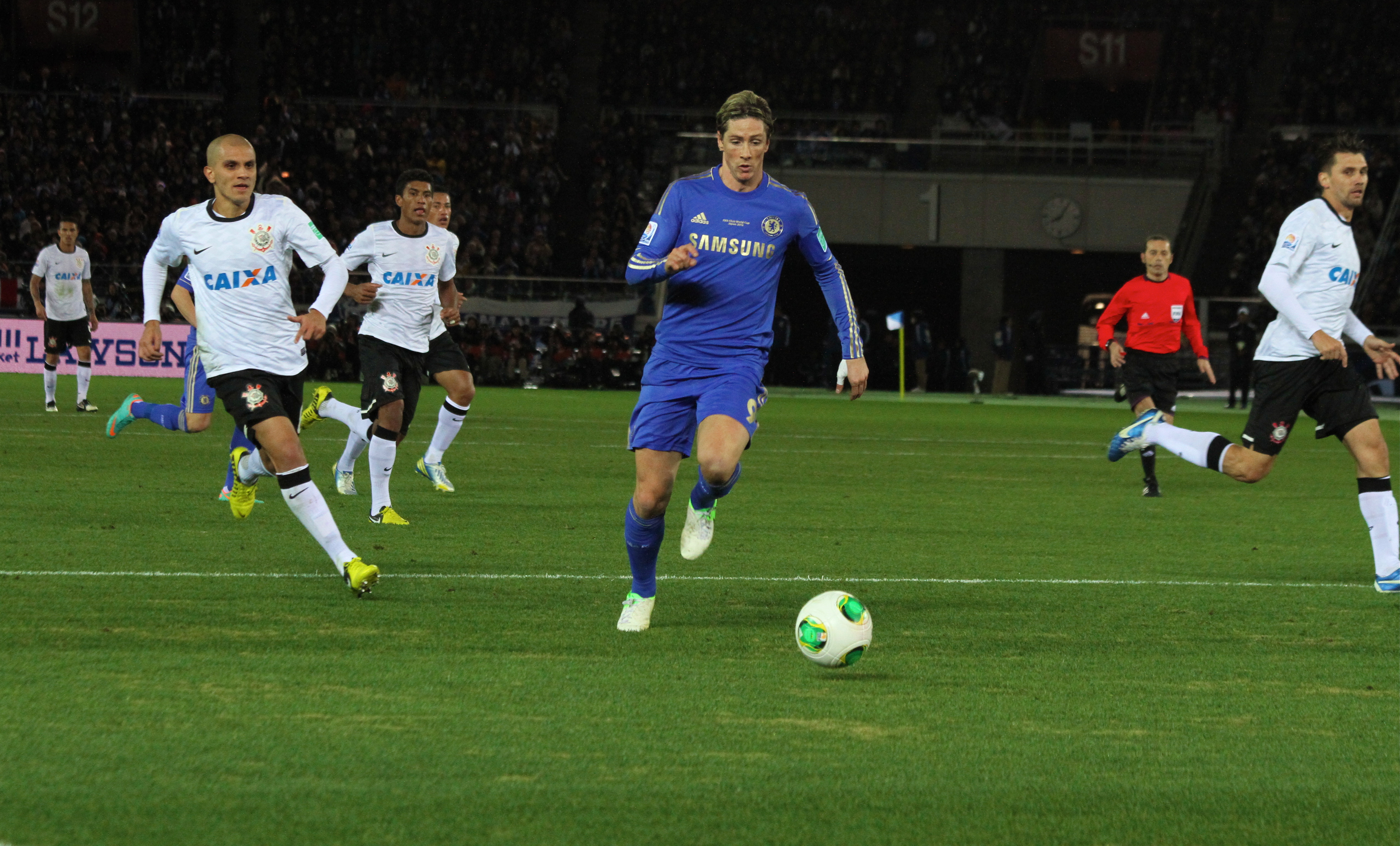
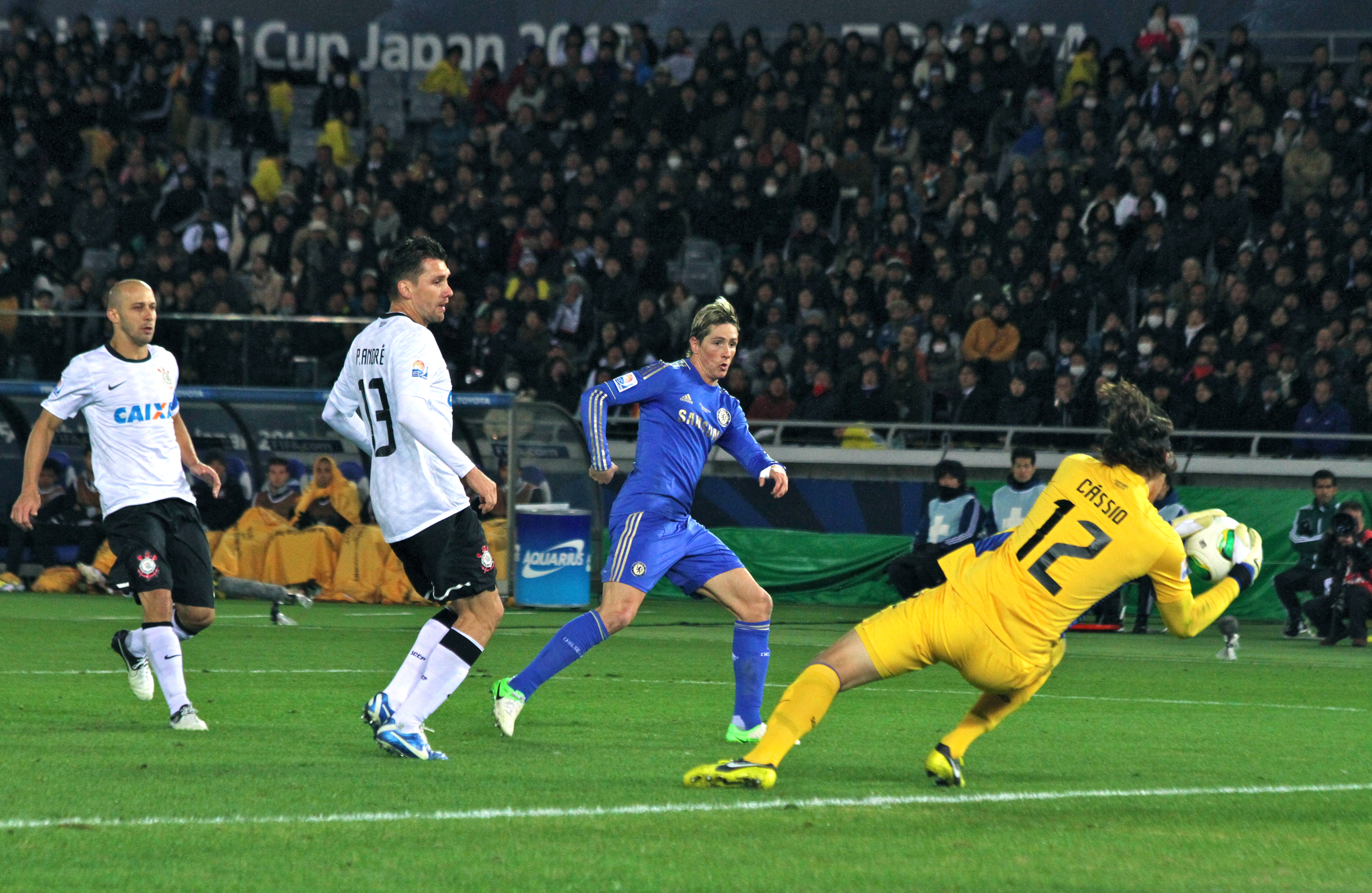
(Left): Fernando Torres being chased by Fábio Santos; (right): Cássio blocks a strike from Torres in the first half

=== Summary ===
In the 69th minute, Corinthians took the lead when a shot from Danilo was blocked by Chelsea defender Gary Cahill before looping up in the air where Paolo Guerrero headed into the net from close range past three Chelsea defenders on the line.

=== Details ===
16 December 2012
19:30 JST

Corinthians (Brazil)	1–0	(England) Chelsea
Guerrero 69'	Report

International Stadium Yokohama, Yokohama
Attendance: 68,275
Referee: Cüneyt Çakır (Turkey)

Corinthians	Chelsea

GK	12	(Brazil) Cássio
RB	2	(Brazil) Alessandro (c)
CB	3	(Brazil) Chicão
CB	13	(Brazil) Paulo André
LB	6	(Brazil) Fábio Santos
DM	5	(Brazil) Ralf
DM	8	(Brazil) Paulinho
RW	23	(Brazil) Jorge Henrique	(yellow card) 56'
AM	20	(Brazil) Danilo
LW	11	(Qatar) Emerson		(substituted off) 90+1'
CF	9	(Peru) Paolo Guerrero		(substituted off) 87'
Substitutions:
FW	7	(Argentina) Juan Manuel Martínez		(substituted on) 87'
DF	4	(Brazil) Wallace		(substituted on) 90+1'
Manager:
(Brazil) Tite

GK	1	(Czech Republic) Petr Čech
RB	2	(Serbia) Branislav Ivanović		(substituted off) 83'
CB	24	(England) Gary Cahill	(red card) 90'
CB	4	(Brazil) David Luiz	(yellow card) 72'
LB	3	(England) Ashley Cole
CM	7	(Brazil) Ramires
CM	8	(England) Frank Lampard (c)
RW	13	(Nigeria) Victor Moses		(substituted off) 73'
AM	10	(Spain) Juan Mata
LW	17	(Belgium) Eden Hazard		(substituted off) 87'
CF	9	(Spain) Fernando Torres
Substitutions:
MF	11	(Brazil) Oscar		(substituted on) 73'
DF	28	(Spain) César Azpilicueta		(substituted on) 83'
MF	21	(Germany) Marko Marin		(substituted on) 87'
Manager:
(Spain) Rafael Benítez

Assistant referees:
Bahattin Duran (Turkey)
Tarık Ongun (Turkey)
Fourth official:
Alireza Faghani (Iran)
Fifth official:
Hassan Kamranifar (Iran)

Match rules

- 90 minutes.
- 30 minutes of extra time if necessary.
- Penalty shoot-out if scores still level.
- Twelve named substitutes.
- Maximum of three substitutions.

=== Statistics ===
First half
	Corinthians	Chelsea
Goals scored	0	0
Total shots	5	9
Shots on target	1	4
Saves	4	1
Ball possession	43%	57%
Corner kicks	1	2
Fouls committed	10	5
Offsides	0	1
Yellow cards	0	0
Red cards	0	0

Second half
	Corinthians	Chelsea
Goals scored	1	0
Total shots	4	5
Shots on target	1	2
Saves	2	0
Ball possession	46%	54%
Corner kicks	3	1
Fouls committed	7	7
Offsides	1	3
Yellow cards	1	1
Red cards	0	1

Overall
	Corinthians	Chelsea
Goals scored	1	0
Total shots	9	14
Shots on target	2	6
Saves	6	1
Ball possession	46%	54%
Corner kicks	4	2
Fouls committed	17	12
Offsides	1	4
Yellow cards	1	1
Red cards	0	1

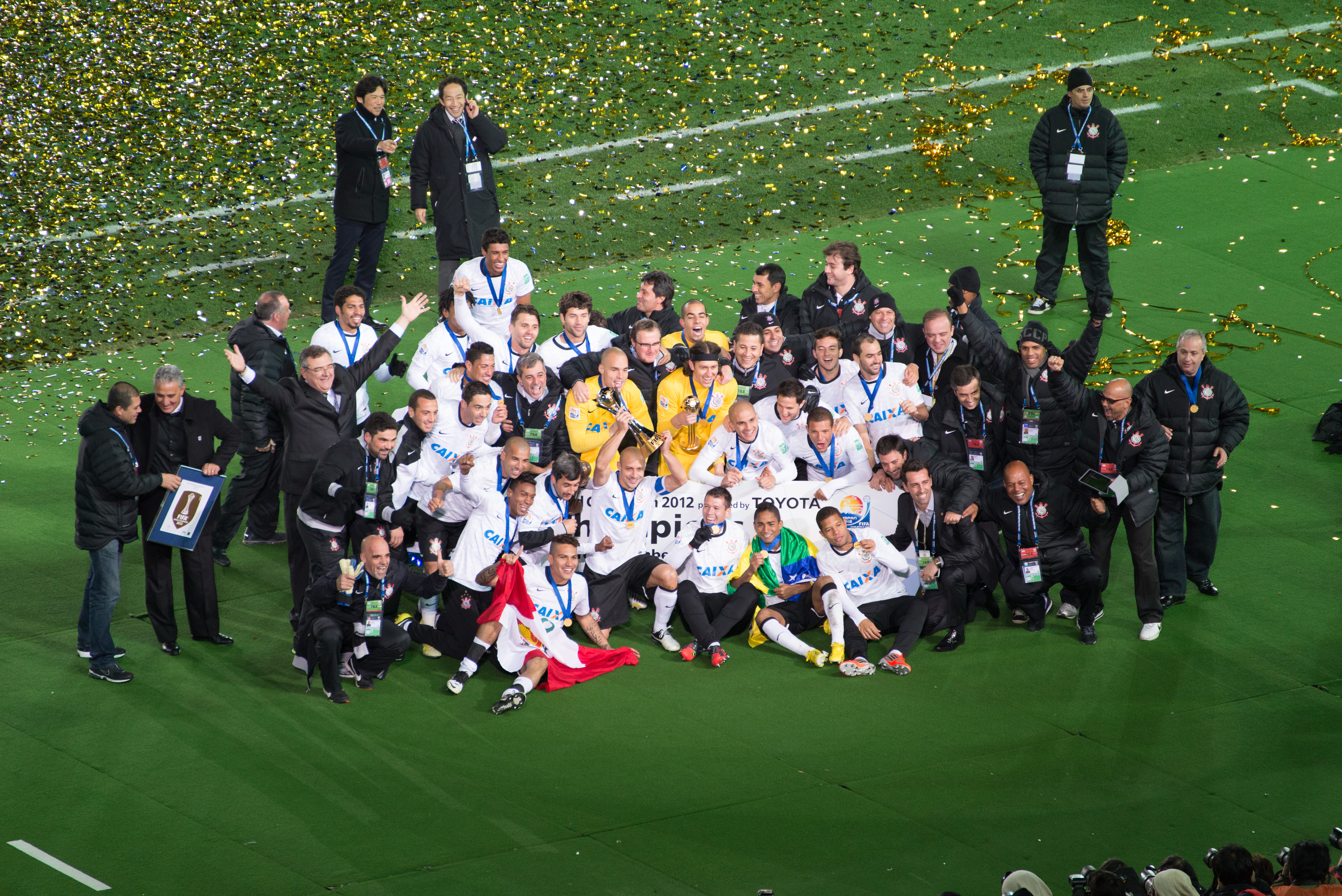
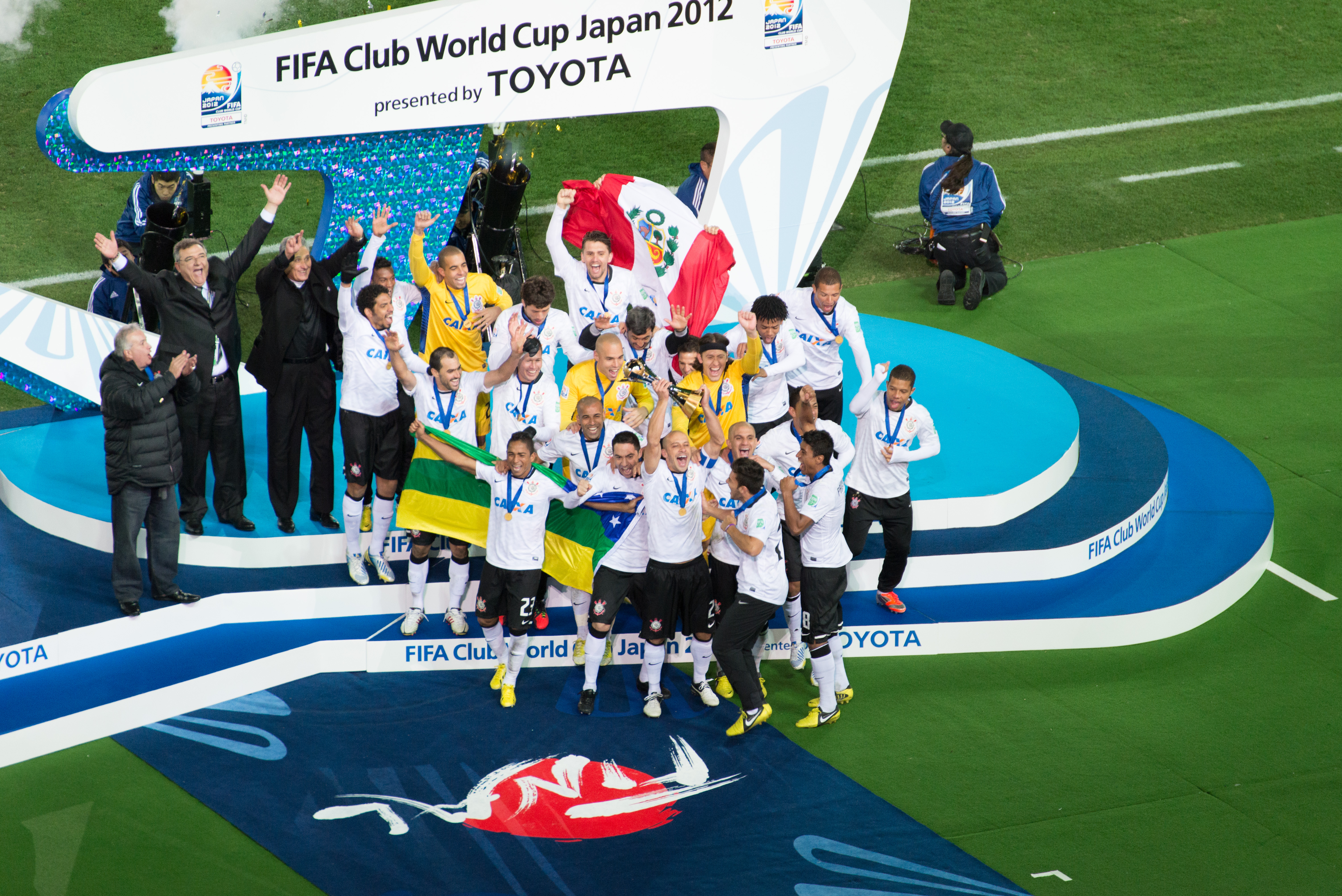
Corinthians celebrating their win

== See also ==
- Chelsea F.C. in international football competitions
