= Jürgen Klopp =

German football manager (born 1967)

Jürgen Klopp CBE
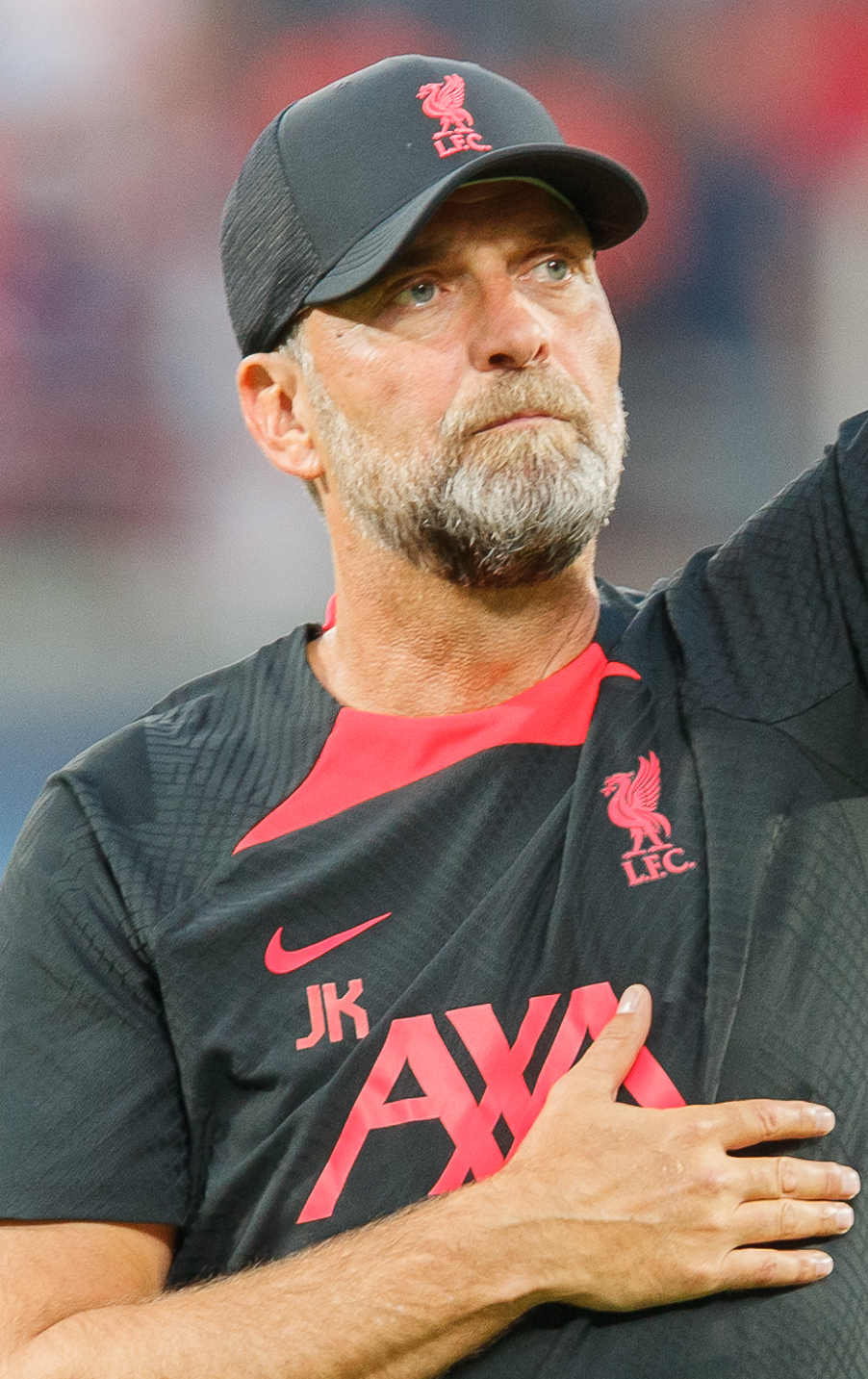
- Klopp with Liverpool in 2022

Personal information
- Full name: Jürgen Norbert Klopp
- Date of birth: 16 June 1967 (age 59)
- Place of birth: Stuttgart, West Germany
- Height: 1.91 m (6 ft 3 in)
- Positions: Striker; defender

Team information
- Current team: Germany (head coach)

Youth career
- 1972–1983: SV Glatten
- 1983–1987: TuS Ergenzingen

Senior career*
Years	Team	Apps	(Gls)
1987	1. FC Pforzheim		
1987–1988	Eintracht Frankfurt II		
1988–1989	Viktoria Sindlingen		
1989–1990	Rot-Weiss Frankfurt	0	(0)
1990–2001	Mainz 05	325	(52)

Managerial career
- 2001–2008: Mainz 05
- 2008–2015: Borussia Dortmund
- 2015–2024: Liverpool
- 2026–: Germany
- * Club domestic league appearances and goals

Jürgen Norbert Klopp (German pronunciation: [ˈjʏʁɡn̩ ˈklɔp]; born 16 June 1967) is a German football manager, executive, and former player who is the head coach of the German national team. He is widely regarded as one of the best managers in the world.

Klopp spent most of his playing career at Mainz 05. He was initially deployed as a striker, but was later moved to defence. Upon retiring in 2001, Klopp became the club's manager, and secured Bundesliga promotion in 2004. After suffering relegation in the 2006–07 season and unable to achieve promotion, Klopp resigned in 2008 as the club's longest-serving manager. He then became manager of Borussia Dortmund, guiding them to the Bundesliga title in 2010–11, before winning Dortmund's first-ever domestic double during a record-breaking season. (Note: Klopp's Dortmund scored a then-record number of points and wins in a Bundesliga season in 2011–12; both records were subsequently broken by Bayern Munich in the 2012–13 season.) Klopp also guided Dortmund to two DFL-Supercup titles in 2013 and 2014 and a runner-up finish in the 2012–13 UEFA Champions League before leaving in 2015 as their longest-serving manager.

Klopp was appointed manager of Liverpool in 2015. He guided the club to UEFA Champions League finals in 2018 and 2022, and won the trophy in 2019 to secure his first – and Liverpool's sixth – title in the competition. Klopp's side finished second in the 2018–19 Premier League, registering 97 points; the then third-highest total in the history of the English top division, and the most by a team without winning the title. The following season, Klopp won the UEFA Super Cup and Liverpool's first FIFA Club World Cup, before delivering Liverpool's first Premier League title, amassing a club record 99 points and breaking a number of top-flight records. These achievements won him back-to-back FIFA Coach of the Year awards in 2019 and 2020. Klopp won a cup double of the EFL Cup and FA Cup in 2022, and the club garnered 92 points in the league, thus Klopp had achieved three of Liverpool's four highest-ever league points totals. He won another EFL Cup in 2024, departing that same year. After a two-year break from coaching, he was appointed head coach of the German national team in 2026.

Klopp is a notable proponent of Gegenpressing, whereby the team, after losing possession, immediately attempts to win back possession, rather than falling back to regroup. He has described his sides as playing "heavy metal" football, in reference to their pressing and high attacking output. Klopp has cited his main influences as Italian coach Arrigo Sacchi, and former Mainz coach Wolfgang Frank. The importance of emotion is something Klopp has underlined throughout his managerial career, and he has gained both admiration and notoriety for his enthusiastic touchline celebrations.

== Early life and playing career ==
Jürgen Norbert Klopp was born on 16 June 1967 in Stuttgart, the state capital of Baden-Württemberg, to Elisabeth (1939–2021) and Norbert Klopp (1932–2000) a travelling salesman and a former goalkeeper. Klopp grew up in the countryside in the Black Forest village of Glatten near Freudenstadt with two older sisters. He started playing for local club SV Glatten and later TuS Ergenzingen as a junior player, with the next stint at 1. FC Pforzheim and then at three Frankfurt clubs, Eintracht Frankfurt II, Viktoria Sindlingen and Rot-Weiss Frankfurt during his adolescence. Introduced to football through his father, Klopp was a supporter of VfB Stuttgart in his youth. As a young boy, Klopp aspired to become a doctor, but he did not believe he "was ever smart enough for a medical career," saying "when they were handing out our A-Level certificates, my headmaster said to me, 'I hope it works out with football, otherwise it's not looking too good for you.'"

While playing as an amateur footballer, Klopp worked a number of part-time jobs including working at a local video rental store and loading heavy items onto lorries. In 1988, while attending the Goethe University Frankfurt, as well as playing for Eintracht Frankfurt's reserves, Klopp managed the Frankfurt D-Juniors. In the summer of 1990, Klopp was signed by Mainz 05. He spent most of his professional career in Mainz, from 1990 to 2001, with his attitude and commitment making him a fan-favourite. Originally a striker, Klopp began playing as a defender in 1995. That same year, Klopp obtained a diploma in sports science at the Goethe University of Frankfurt (MSc equivalent), writing his thesis about walking. He retired as Mainz 05's record goal scorer, registering 56 goals in total, including 52 league goals.

Klopp confessed that as a player he felt more suited to a managerial role, describing himself by saying "I had fourth-division feet and a first-division head." Recalling his trial at Eintracht Frankfurt where he played alongside Andreas Möller, Klopp described how his 19-year-old self thought, "if that's football, I'm playing a completely different game. He was world-class. I was not even class." As a player, Klopp closely followed his manager's methods on the training field as well as making weekly trips to Cologne to study under Erich Rutemöller to obtain his Football Coaching Licence.

== Managerial career ==
=== Mainz 05 ===
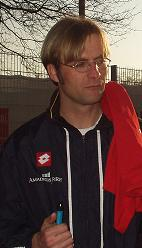
In 2004, Klopp led his former club, Mainz 05, to Bundesliga promotion.

Upon his retirement from playing for Mainz 05, Klopp was appointed as the club's manager on 27 February 2001 following the dismissal of Eckhard Krautzun. The day after, Klopp took charge of their first match, which saw Mainz 05 secure a 1–0 home win over MSV Duisburg. Klopp went on to win six out of his first seven games in charge, eventually finishing in 14th place, avoiding relegation with one game to spare. After successfully avoiding relegation, Klopp remained head coach and appointed his former teammate Željko Buvač as his assistant—a partnership that would last 17 years, as Buvač followed Klopp as his assistant to Dortmund and FC Liverpool.

In his first full season in charge in 2001–02, Klopp guided Mainz to finish 4th in the league as he implemented his favoured pressing and counter-pressing tactics, narrowly missing promotion. Mainz again finished 4th in 2002–03, denied promotion again on the final day on goal difference. After two seasons of disappointment, Klopp led Mainz to a third-place finish in the 2003–04 season, securing promotion to the Bundesliga for the first time in the club's history.

Despite having the smallest budget and the smallest stadium in the league, Mainz finished 11th in their first top-flight season in 2004–05. Klopp's side finished 11th again in 2005–06 as well as securing qualification for the 2005–06 UEFA Cup, although they were knocked out in the first round by eventual champions Sevilla. At the end of the 2006–07 season, Mainz 05 were relegated, but Klopp chose to remain with the club. However, unable to achieve promotion the next year, Klopp resigned at the end of the 2007–08 season. He finished with a record of 109 wins, 78 draws, and 83 losses.

=== Borussia Dortmund ===
==== 2008–2013: Consecutive league titles, domestic double, and first European final ====
In May 2008, Klopp was approached to become the new manager of Borussia Dortmund. Despite having interest from German champions Bayern Munich, Klopp eventually signed a two-year contract at the club, which had finished in a disappointing 13th place under previous manager Thomas Doll. Next to Buvač Klopp appointed Peter Krawietz as his assistant manager—just like Buvač Krawietz became a long serving assistant of Klopp, as he followed Klopp to Liverpool and Red Bull Leipzig.

Klopp's opening game as manager was on 9 August in a 3–1 DFB-Pokal victory away to Rot-Weiss Essen. In his first season, Klopp won his first trophy with the club after defeating German champions Bayern Munich to claim the 2008 German Supercup. He led the club to a sixth-place finish in his first season in charge. The next season Klopp secured European football as he led Dortmund to a fifth-place finish, despite having one of the youngest squads in the league.

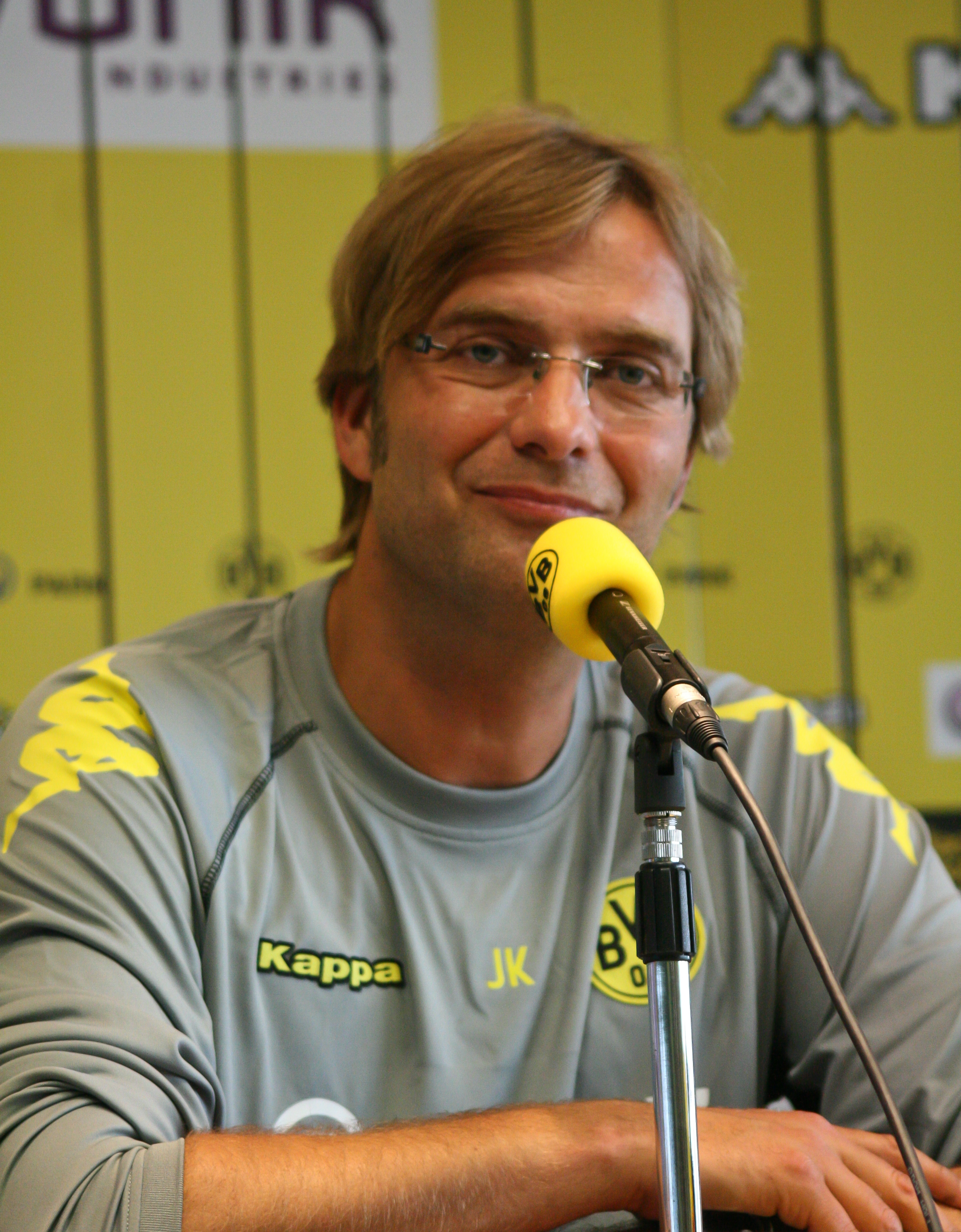
Klopp at a press conference ahead of Borussia Dortmund's title-winning 2010–11 season

After losing 2–0 to Bayer Leverkusen on the opening day of the 2010–11 Bundesliga, Klopp's Dortmund side won fourteen of their next fifteen matches to secure the top spot in the league for Christmas. They clinched the 2010–11 Bundesliga title, their seventh league title, with two games to spare on 30 April 2011, beating 1. FC Nürnberg 2–0 at home. Klopp's side were the youngest ever side to win the Bundesliga.

Klopp and his team successfully defended their title, winning the 2011–12 Bundesliga. Their total of 81 points that season was the greatest total points in Bundesliga history and the 47 points earned in the second half of the season also set a new record. Their 25 league wins equalled Bayern Munich's record, while their 28-league match unbeaten run was the best ever recorded in a single German top-flight season. (Note: The record number of points, for the whole season and the second half of the season, and the record number of league wins set or equalled by Dortmund in the 2011–12 season were broken by Bayern Munich in the 2012–13 season.) Dortmund lost the 2011 DFL-Supercup against rivals Schalke 04. On 12 May 2012, Klopp sealed the club's first ever domestic double, by defeating Bayern Munich 5–2 to win the 2012 DFB-Pokal final, which he described as being "better than [he] could have imagined".

Dortmund's league form during the 2012–13 season was not as impressive as in the previous campaign, with Klopp insisting that his team would focus on the UEFA Champions League to make up for their disappointing run in that competition in the previous season. Klopp's team were drawn against Manchester City, Real Madrid and Ajax in what was described as the competition's "group of death". However, they did not lose a game, topping the group with some impressive performances. Dortmund faced José Mourinho's Real Madrid again, this time in the semi-finals. After an excellent result against them at home in the first leg, a 4–1 victory, a 2–0 loss meant Dortmund narrowly progressed to the final. On 23 April 2013, it was announced that Dortmund's crucial playmaker Mario Götze was moving on 1 July to rivals Bayern Munich after they had triggered Götze's release clause of €37 million. Klopp admitted his annoyance at the timing of the announcement of Götze's move, as it was barely 36 hours before Dortmund's Champions League semi-final with Real Madrid. Klopp later said that Dortmund had no chance of convincing Götze to stay with Dortmund, saying, "He is a Pep Guardiola favourite". Dortmund lost the final 2–1 to Bayern, with an 89th-minute goal from Arjen Robben. Dortmund finished in second place in the Bundesliga. They also lost the 2012 DFL-Supercup, and were knocked out of the DFB-Pokal in the round of 16.

==== 2013–2015: Final years at Dortmund ====
At the beginning of the 2013–14 season, Klopp extended his contract until June 2018. Klopp received a fine of €10,000 on 17 March 2014 after getting sent off from a Bundesliga match against Borussia Mönchengladbach. The ejection was a result of "verbal attack" on the referee, Deniz Aytekin, who stated that Klopp's behaviour was "rude on more than one occasion". Borussia Dortmund Vorstand chairman Hans-Joachim Watzke stated that "I have to support Jürgen Klopp 100 percent in this case" because he saw no reason for a fine and denied that Klopp insulted the fourth official. Dortmund finished the 2013–14 season in second place. On 4 January 2014, it was announced that Dortmund striker Robert Lewandowski signed a pre-contract agreement to join Bayern Munich at the end of the season, becoming the second key player after Götze to leave the club within a year. Also during the 2013–14 season, Dortmund won the 2013 DFL-Supercup, but were knocked out of the Champions League in the quarter-finals by eventual champions Real Madrid.

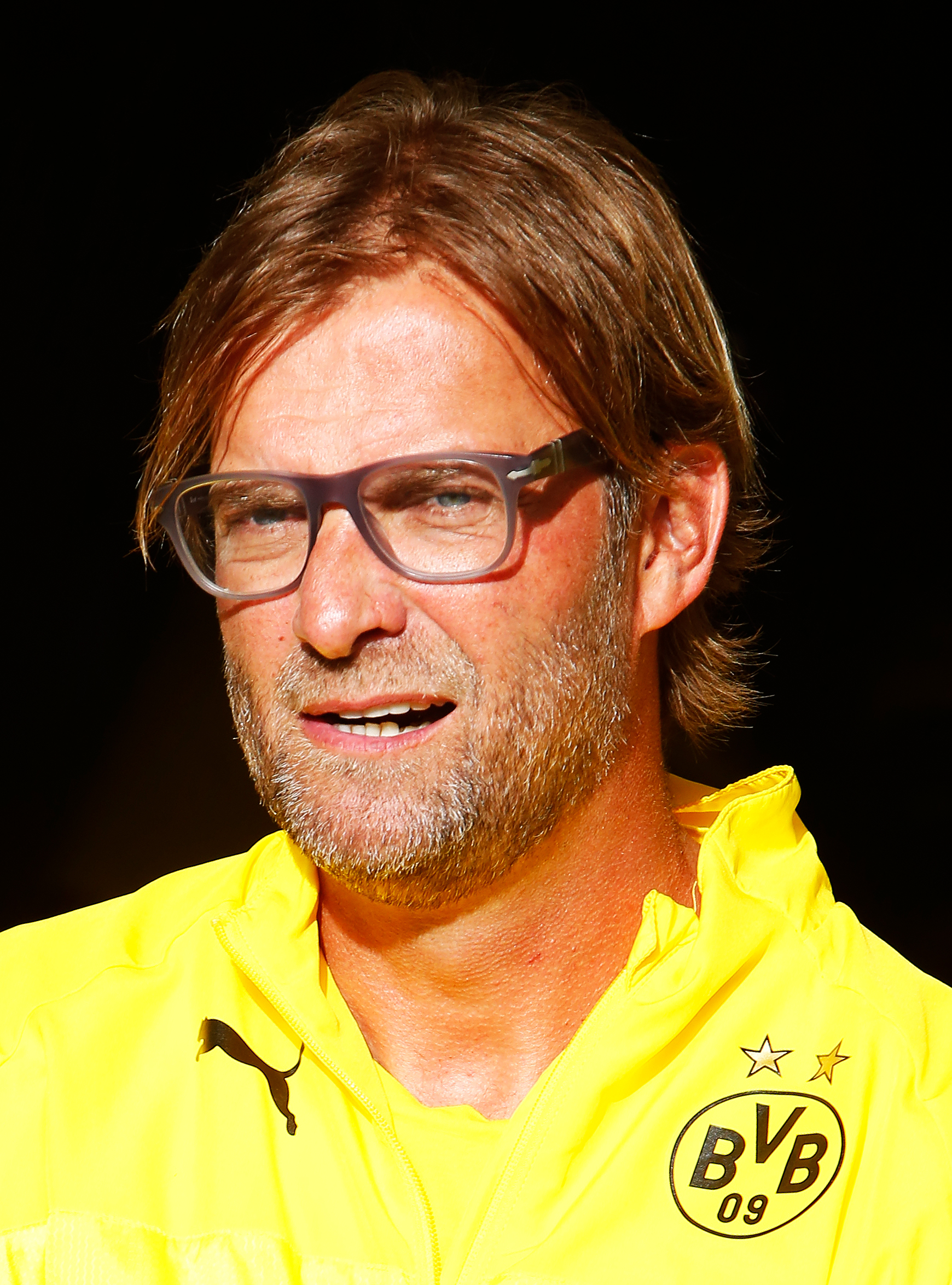
Klopp left Dortmund at the end of the 2014–15 season.

Dortmund started the 2014–15 season by winning the 2014 DFL-Supercup. After a disappointing beginning of the season, Klopp announced in April that he would leave the club at the end of the season, saying "I really think the decision is the right one. This club deserves to be coached from the 100% right manager" as well as adding "I chose this time to announce it because in the last few years some player decisions were made late and there was no time to react", referring to the departures of Götze and Lewandowski in the seasons prior. He denied speculation that he was tired of the role, saying, "It's not that I'm tired, I've not had contact with another club but don't plan to take a sabbatical". Confronted with the thesis that Dortmund's form immediately improved after the announcement, he joked, "If I'd known, I would have announced it at the beginning of the season". His final match in charge of the team was the 2015 DFB-Pokal final, which Dortmund lost 3–1 against VfL Wolfsburg. Dortmund finished in the league in seventh place and were knocked out of Champions League in the round of 16 by Juventus. He finished with a record of 180 wins, 69 draws, and 70 losses.

=== Liverpool ===
==== 2015–2017: European runners-up and return to Champions League ====
On 8 October 2015, Klopp agreed a three-year deal to become Liverpool manager, replacing Brendan Rodgers. According to El País, Liverpool co-owner John W. Henry did not trust public opinion so he looked for a mathematical method similar to Moneyball, the approach that Henry used for Major League Baseball's Boston Red Sox in guiding them to three World Series wins, which he also owns via Fenway Sports Group. The mathematical model turned out to be that of Cambridge physicist Ian Graham, which was used to select the manager, Klopp, and players essential for Liverpool to win the Champions League. In his first press conference, Klopp described his new side saying "it is not a normal club, it is a special club. I had two very special clubs with Mainz and Dortmund. It is the perfect next step for me to be here and try and help" and stating his intention to deliver trophies within four years. During his first conference, Klopp dubbed himself 'The Normal One' in a parody of José Mourinho's famous 'The Special One' statement in 2004.

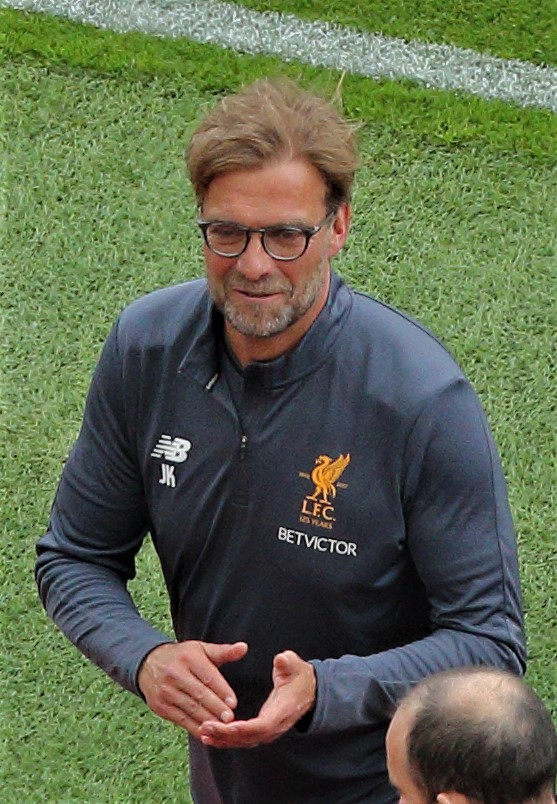
Klopp after winning against Middlesbrough on the final day of the 2016–17 season to secure fourth in the league

Klopp's debut was a 0–0 away draw with Tottenham Hotspur on 17 October. On 28 October, Klopp secured his first win as Liverpool manager against AFC Bournemouth in the League Cup to proceed to the quarter-finals. His first Premier League win came three days later, a 3–1 away victory against Chelsea. After three 1–1 draws in the opening matches of the UEFA Europa League, Liverpool defeated Rubin Kazan 1–0 in Klopp's first win in Europe as Liverpool manager. On 6 February 2016, he missed a league match to have an appendectomy after suffering suspected appendicitis. On 28 February, Liverpool lost the 2016 League Cup final at Wembley to Manchester City on penalties. On 17 March, Liverpool progressed to the quarter-final of the Europa League by defeating Manchester United 3–1 on aggregate. On 14 April, Liverpool fought back from a 3–1 second half deficit in the second leg of their quarter-final match against his former club Dortmund to win 4–3, advancing to the semi-finals 5–4 on aggregate. On 5 May, Klopp guided Liverpool to their first European final since 2007 by beating Villarreal 3–1 on aggregate in the semi-finals of the Europa League. In the final, Liverpool faced Sevilla, losing 3–1 with Daniel Sturridge scoring the opening goal for Liverpool in the first half. Liverpool finished the 2015–16 season in eighth place. On 8 July 2016, Klopp and his coaching staff signed six-year extensions to their deals keeping them at Liverpool until 2022. Liverpool qualified for the Champions League for the first time since 2014–15 on 21 May 2017, after winning 3–0 at home against Middlesbrough and finishing fourth in the 2016–17 Premier League season.

==== 2017–2019: First Champions League title ====
Klopp's side finished fourth in the 2017–18 Premier League, securing qualification for the Champions League for a second consecutive season. Along with the emergence of Andrew Robertson and Trent Alexander-Arnold as regular starters at fullback, Virgil van Dijk and Dejan Lovren built a strong partnership at the heart of Liverpool's defence, with the Dutchman being credited for improving Liverpool's previous defensive issues. Klopp guided Liverpool to their first Champions League final since 2007 in 2018 after a 5–1 aggregate quarter-final win against eventual Premier League champions, Manchester City and a 7–6 aggregate win over Roma in the semi-final. However, Liverpool went on to lose in the final 3–1 to Real Madrid. This was Klopp's sixth defeat in seven major finals. Despite their attacking prowess, Klopp's side had been criticised for their relatively high number of goals conceded, something which Klopp sought to improve by signing defender Virgil van Dijk in the January transfer window, for a reported fee of £75 million, a world record transfer fee for a defender. In the summer transfer window, Klopp made a number of high-profile signings including midfielders Naby Keïta and Fabinho, forward Xherdan Shaqiri and goalkeeper Alisson.

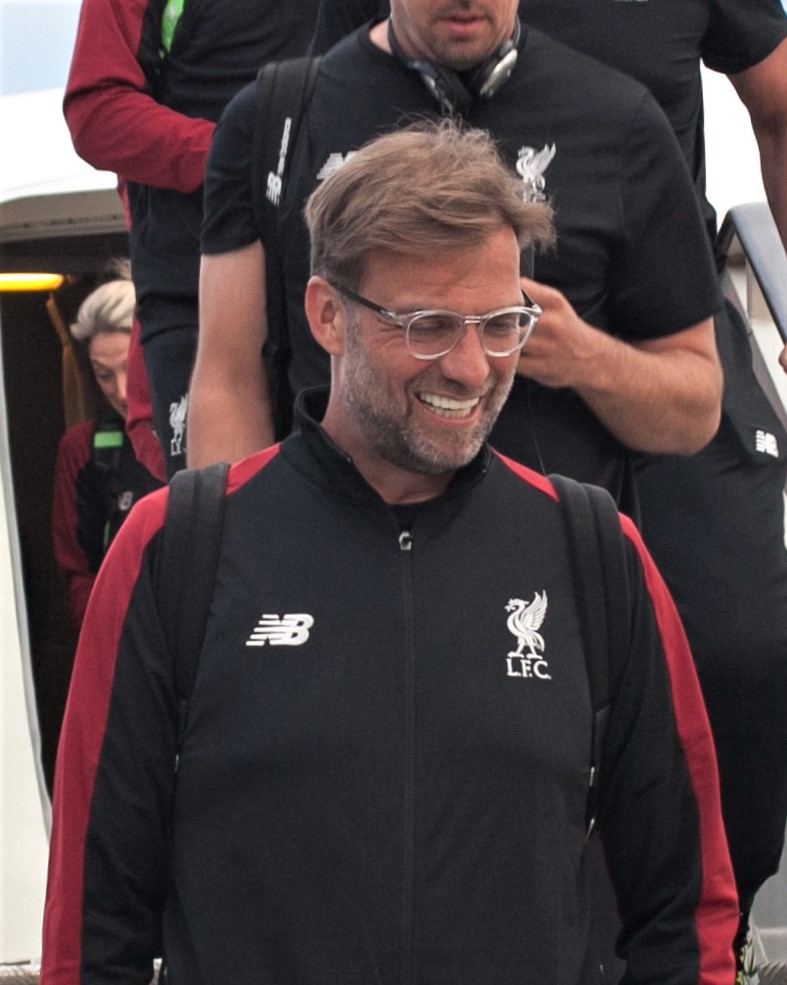
Klopp led Liverpool to consecutive UEFA Champions League finals in 2018 and 2019, winning the latter against Tottenham Hotspur.

Liverpool started the 2018–19 season with the best league start in the club's history, winning their first six matches. On 2 December 2018, Klopp was charged with misconduct after running onto the pitch during the Merseyside derby to celebrate Divock Origi's 96th-minute winning goal with goalkeeper Alisson. Following a 2–0 win against Wolverhampton Wanderers, Liverpool ended Christmas Day four points clear at the top of the league. A 4–0 win against Newcastle United on Boxing Day saw Klopp's side extend their lead in the league to six points at the half-way point of the season, as well as becoming only the fourth Premier League team to be unbeaten at this stage. It was Klopp's 100th win in 181 matches as Liverpool manager. Klopp's defensive additions proved to be effective as his side equalled the all-time record for the fewest goals conceded at this stage of a top-flight season, conceding just 7 goals and keeping 12 clean sheets in 19 matches. On 29 December, Klopp's side thrashed Arsenal 5–1 at Anfield, extending their unbeaten home run in the league to 31 matches, matching their best such run in the competition. The result saw them move nine points clear at the top of the league, and meant Liverpool won all 8 of their matches in December. Klopp subsequently received the Premier League Manager of the Month award for December. Klopp's side finished the season as runners-up to Manchester City, to whom they suffered their only league defeat of the season. Winning all of their last nine matches, Klopp's Liverpool scored 97 points, the third-highest total in the history of the English top-division and the most points scored by a team without winning the title, and remained unbeaten at home for the second season running. Their thirty league wins matched the club record for wins in a season.

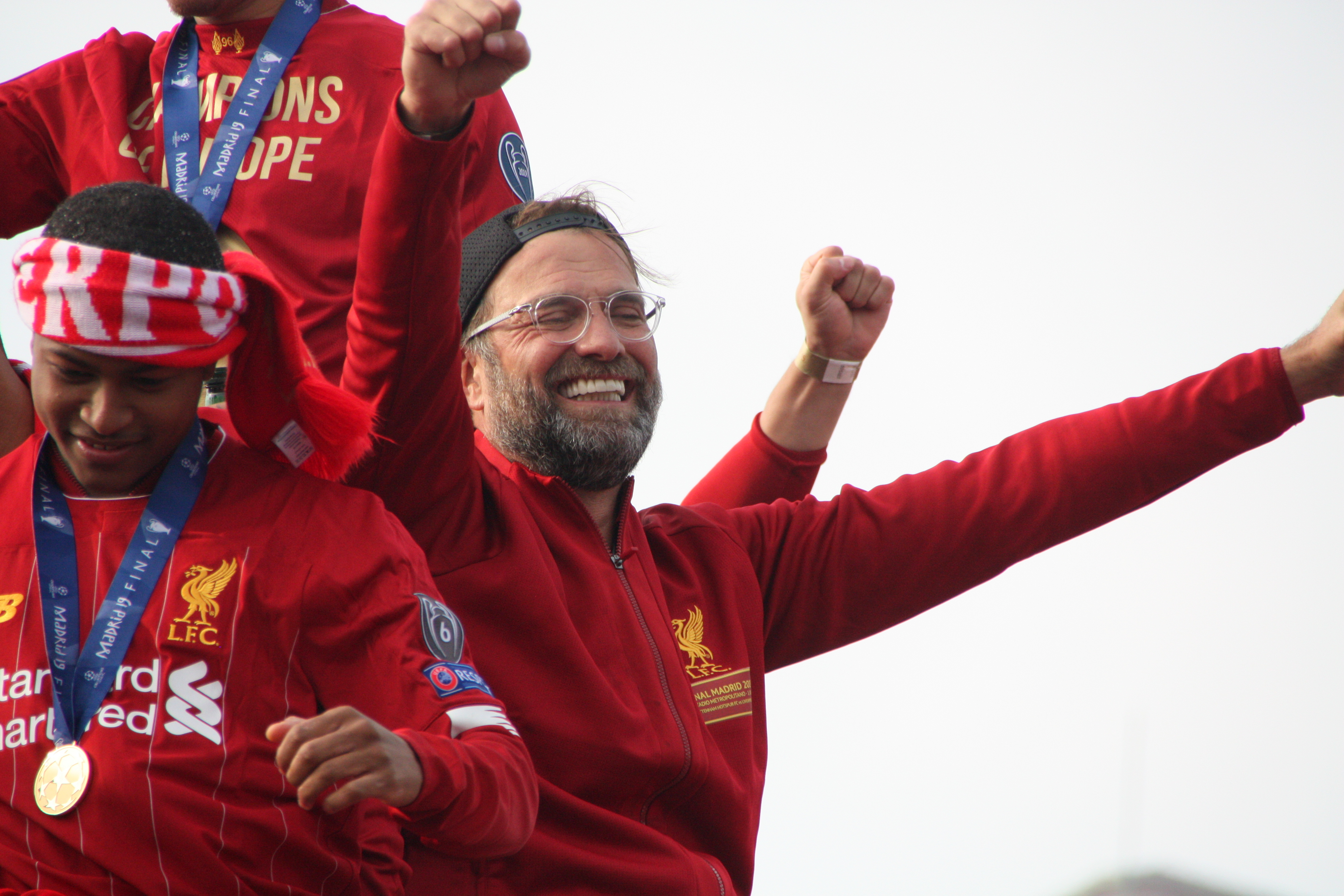
Klopp during Liverpool's Champions League victory parade

Success eluded Klopp's Liverpool side in domestic cup competitions in 2018–19. On 26 September 2018, Klopp's side were knocked out in the third round of the League Cup after losing 2–1 to Chelsea, their first defeat of the season in all competitions, and were knocked out of the FA Cup after losing 2–1 to Wolves in the third round. Despite a lack of success in domestic cup competitions, Liverpool enjoyed a vintage run in the 2018–19 UEFA Champions League. Klopp's side finished second in their group by virtue of goals scored to qualify for the knockout phase, before drawing German champions Bayern Munich in the round of 16. A scoreless draw in the first leg, followed by 3–1 victory in the second leg at the Allianz Arena saw Liverpool qualify for the quarter-finals. Liverpool won their quarter-final tie against Porto with an aggregate score of 6–1 to advance to the semi-finals, where Klopp's Liverpool faced tournament favourites Barcelona. After suffering a 3–0 defeat at the Nou Camp, Klopp reportedly asked his players to "just try" or "fail in the most beautiful way" in the second leg of the tie at Anfield. In the second leg, Klopp's side overturned the deficit with a 4–0 win, advancing to the final 4–3 on aggregate, despite Mohamed Salah and Roberto Firmino being absent with injuries, in what was described as one of the greatest comebacks in Champions League history. In the final at the Metropolitano Stadium in Madrid against Tottenham Hotspur, Liverpool won 2–0 with goals from Salah and Divock Origi, despite only having 39% possession over the course of the game, giving Klopp his first trophy with Liverpool, his first Champions League title, and the club's sixth European Cup/Champions League title overall.

==== 2019–2020: Premier League title ====
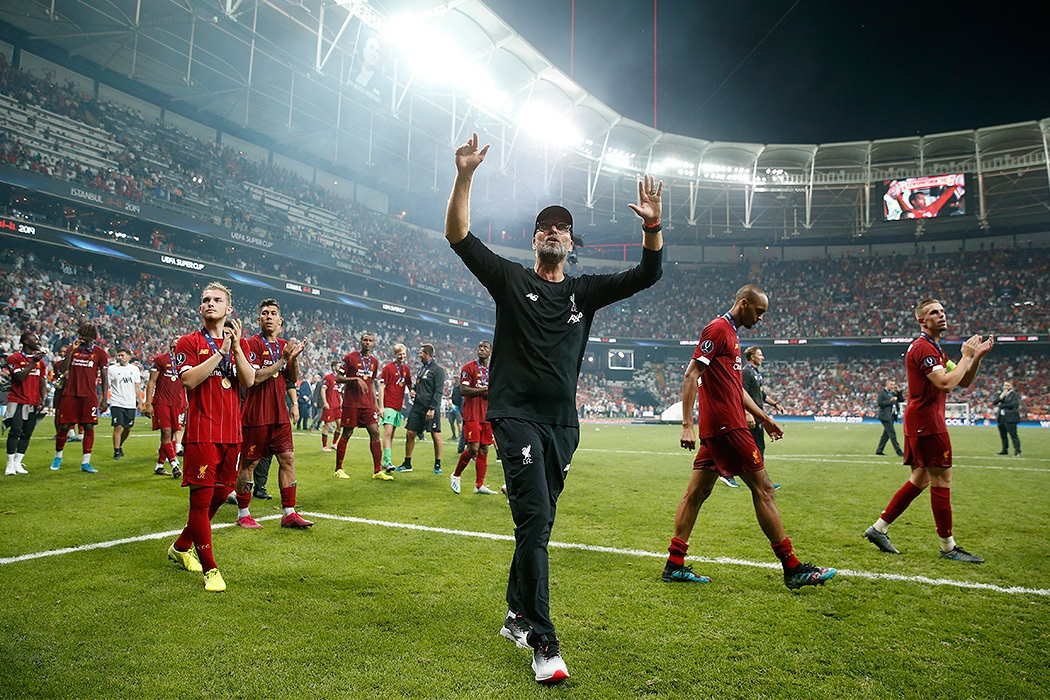
Klopp celebrating Liverpool's victory in the 2019 UEFA Super Cup

Klopp's side started the 2019–20 season by playing Manchester City in the 2019 FA Community Shield, against whom they lost 5–4 on penalties. Having qualified as winners of the Champions League, Klopp's side played Europa League champions Chelsea in the Super Cup. With the scores level after extra-time, Klopp's side won 5–4 on penalties, giving Klopp his second trophy with the club. It was Liverpool's fourth triumph in the tournament, placing them behind only Barcelona and AC Milan with five titles apiece. In the 2019–20 Premier League, Klopp's Liverpool won their first six matches to move five points clear at the top of the table. After the fourth match week, Klopp was named Premier League Manager of the Month for August, his fourth award of the monthly prize. Their 2–1 away victory over Chelsea set a club-record seven successive away league wins and made Liverpool the first Premier League club to win their first six games in successive seasons. On 23 September, Klopp was named as The Best FIFA Men's Coach for 2019, ahead of Pep Guardiola and Mauricio Pochettino. At the awards ceremony, Klopp revealed that he had signed up to the Common Goal movement, donating 1% of his salary to a charity which funds organisations around the world using football to tackle social issues. On 11 October, it was announced that Klopp had been named Manager of the Month for September, winning the award for the second consecutive month.

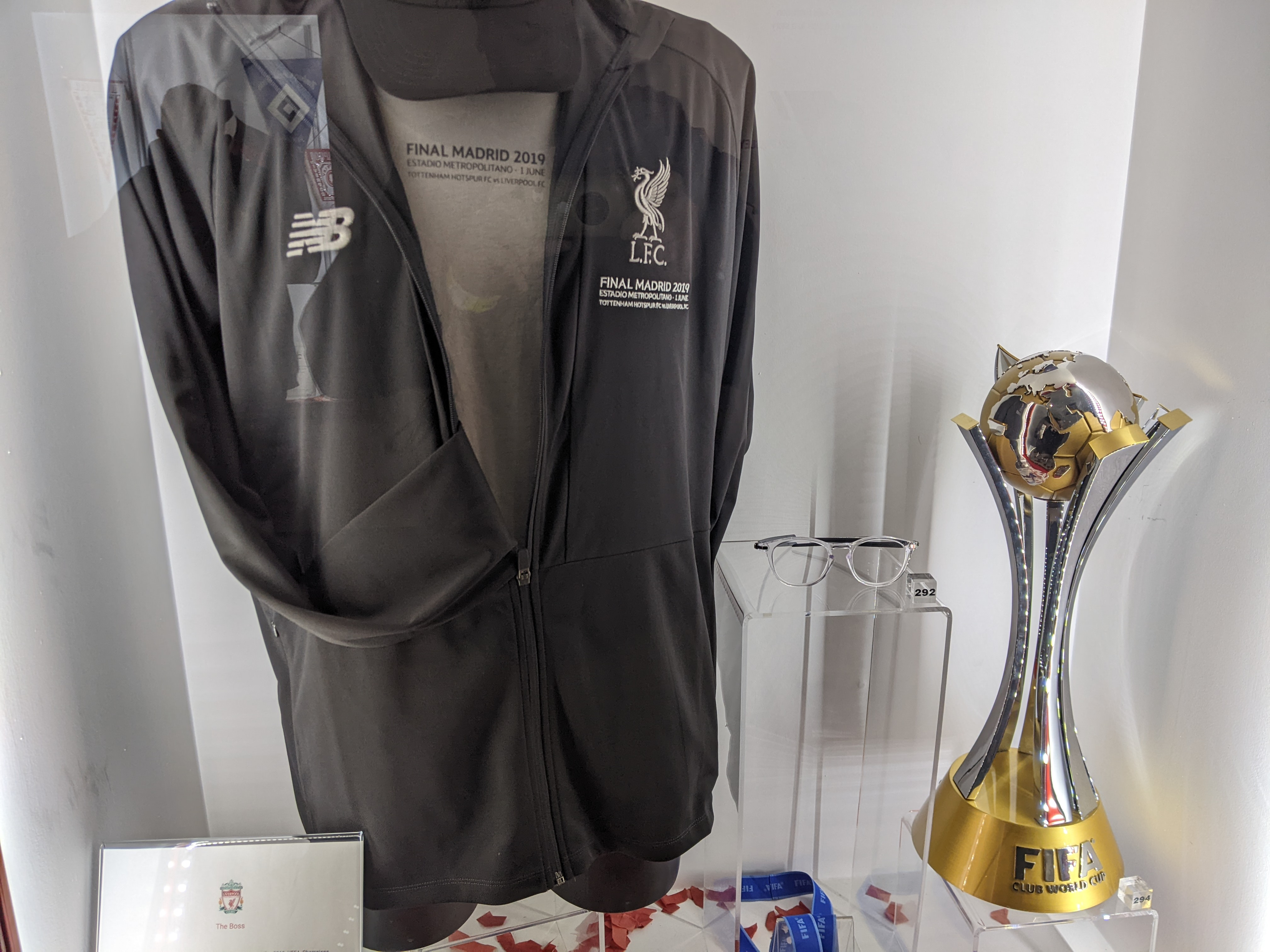
The FIFA Club World Cup trophy won in 2019 next to Klopp's tracksuit top, cap and glasses (from the 2019 Champions League final) in the Liverpool F.C. museum

On 30 November, following a 2–1 win over Brighton & Hove Albion, Klopp saw Liverpool equal an all-time club record of 31 consecutive league matches without defeat, since the club's last defeat to Manchester City on 3 January, dating back to 1988. His side broke the record a week later following a 5–2 win over Everton. Following a victory against Red Bull Salzburg on 10 December that saw Liverpool top their Champions League group, Klopp signed a contract extension that will keep him at the club until 2024. In December, Klopp won his third Premier League Manager of the month award for November, after winning all four league matches with Liverpool. On 21 December, he led Liverpool to their first FIFA Club World Cup trophy, with victory over Flamengo in the final, making his team the first English side to win the international treble of the Champions League, Super Cup and Club World Cup. His side ended 2019 with a 1–0 home win against Wolves. The result extended Liverpool's unbeaten home run to 50 matches and gave Klopp's Reds a 13-point lead at the top of the table with a game-in-hand. Klopp was subsequently named as the Premier League Manager of the Month for December, winning the award for the fourth time that season. A 1–0 away win against Tottenham Hotspur on 11 January 2020 extended Liverpool's unbeaten run to 38 league games – a club record – totalling 61 points from 21 games, the most ever at that stage of the season by a side in Europe's top five leagues. On 1 February, Klopp's side won 4–0 at home against Southampton to go 22 points clear at the top of the Premier League; the biggest end-of-day lead in English top-flight history, and following second-place Manchester City's defeat to Spurs the next day, the largest gap ever between first and second in top-flight history. Klopp was subsequently named as the Premier League Manager of the Month for January – his fifth of the season so far – breaking the record for the most wins of the award in a single season.

A 3–2 home victory against West Ham United on 24 February 2020 saw Klopp's side equal the English top-flight records for the most consecutive wins (18) and the most consecutive home wins (21, set by Bill Shankly's Liverpool side in the 1972–73 season); the latter setting a record for the Premier League era. Klopp said after the game that he "never thought [Manchester City's win record] would be broken or equalled." A 2–1 win against Bournemouth at Anfield on 7 March saw Liverpool set an English top-flight record of 22 consecutive home wins. On 25 June, Klopp's side clinched the title with 7 games left to spare; it was the club's nineteenth league title, its first since 1989–90 and its first during the Premier League era. In the season, Liverpool set a number of English-top flight records including the most consecutive home wins (23), the largest point lead at the end of a matchweek (22), and upon winning the league claimed the unusual achievement of winning the Premier League earlier than any other team by games played (with seven remaining) and later than any other team by date (being the only team to clinch the title in June). Beginning the season prior, Liverpool also enjoyed a 44 match unbeaten run in the league – the second-longest streak in top-flight history – ended by Watford on 29 February. Liverpool finished the season on a club record 99 points, the second-highest points tally in top-flight history; finishing 18 points clear of second place. At the end of the season, Klopp was named LMA Manager of the Year as well as Premier League Manager of the Season.

==== 2020–2022: Domestic and international success ====
After winning the opening three league games of the 2020–21 season against Leeds United, Chelsea and Arsenal, on 4 October 2020, Klopp's side lost 7–2 away to Aston Villa. It was the first time Liverpool conceded seven goals in a league match since 1963. However, following a controversial draw in the first Merseyside derby of the season, in which defender Virgil van Dijk was injured for the rest of the season, they then bounced back with wins against Sheffield United and West Ham United. They went into the international break third in the league and top of their group in the Champions League after a 5–0 win against Atalanta. On 22 November, Klopp led Liverpool to a club record 64th consecutive league match unbeaten at Anfield – surpassing the previous record of 63 games under Bob Paisley between 1978 and 1981 – with a 3–0 win over Leicester City. On 17 December, Klopp was named the Best FIFA Men's Coach for the second successive year having guided the club to their first league title triumph in 30 years. On 20 December, Klopp won the BBC's Sports Coach of the Year. A poor run of form in the early part of 2021 – which coincided with Liverpool being without their three senior central defenders who were out injured for the remainder of the season – saw Liverpool as low as eighth in March. The club then rallied to go undefeated in their last ten league games, with eight wins and two draws, which saw Liverpool finish 3rd in the league. This run of form saw Klopp rely on a new defensive partnership of Nat Phillips and Rhys Williams, both of whom had no prior experience in the Premier League, and included Klopp's first win at Old Trafford, home of arch rivals Manchester United, with Liverpool winning 4–2. The five league wins in May saw Klopp named Premier League Manager of the Month, the ninth time he has received the award.

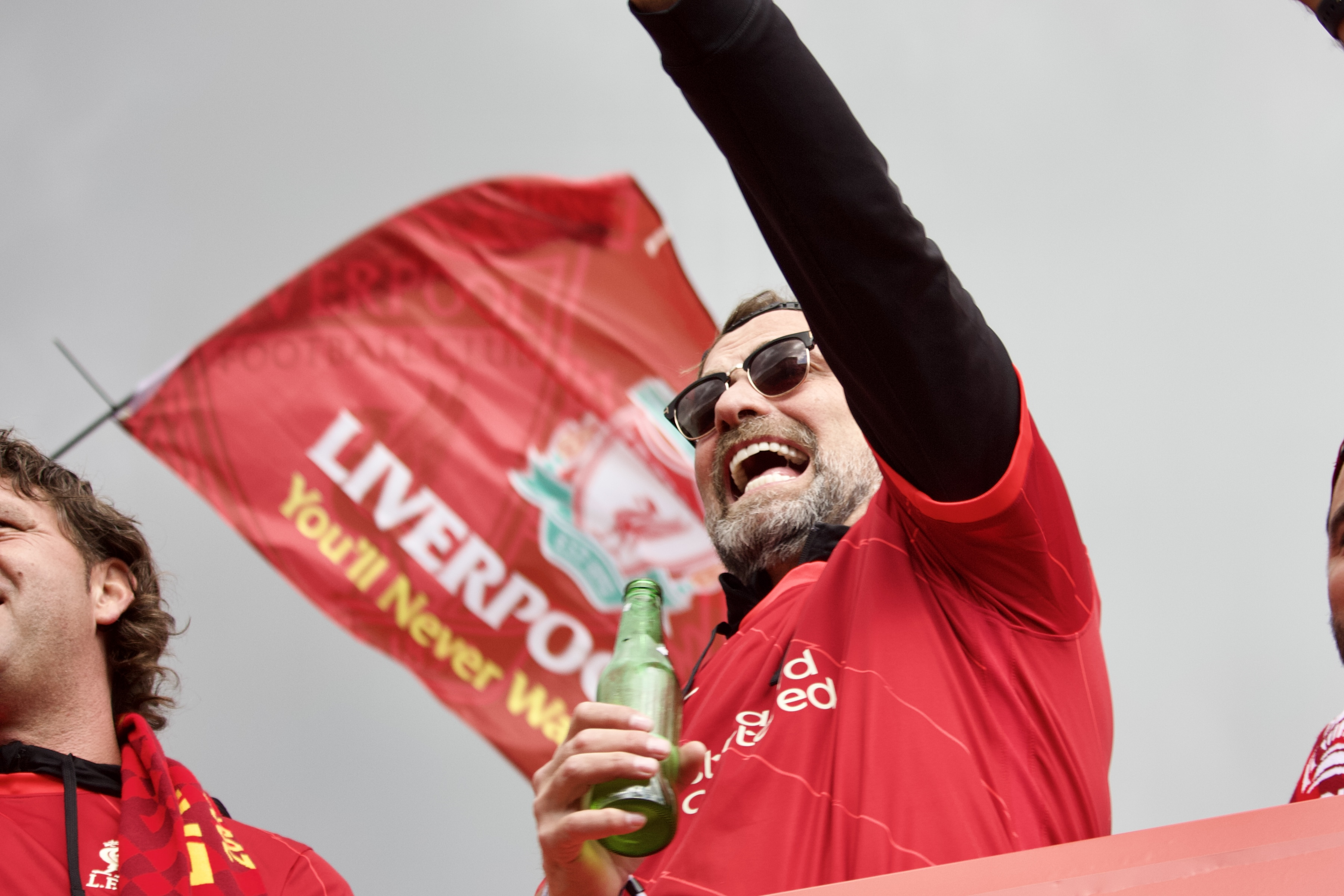
Klopp celebrating Liverpool winning the domestic cup double in a trophy parade in 2022

Having started the 2021–22 season with five wins and three draws from the first eight league fixtures, on 24 October 2021, Liverpool beat Manchester United 5–0 at Old Trafford. This was Klopp's 200th victory in 331 games in charge of Liverpool, making him the fastest manager in the club's history to reach that milestone. On 1 December, Klopp led Liverpool to a 4–1 away win against Everton in the Premier League as the club became the first team in English top-flight history to score at least two goals in 18 successive games in all competitions. On 7 December, Liverpool won 2–1 away against Milan to became the first English club to win all six Champions League group games in the competition's history. On 16 December, Klopp became the fastest manager in Liverpool history to record 150 league wins with a 3–1 home win against Newcastle United in what was Liverpool's 2,000th top-flight win. On 27 February 2022, he led Liverpool to their first domestic final since 2016, the 2022 EFL Cup final, in which they beat Thomas Tuchel's Chelsea 11–10 on penalties after a 0–0 draw that went to extra time. It was a record-breaking ninth victory for Liverpool, and the first time they had won the competition since 2012. Following Sean Dyche's dismissal by Burnley on 15 April, Klopp became the longest serving manager in the Premier League. On 28 April, Klopp signed a two-year contract extension, extending his stay at Liverpool until 2026. In the 2022 FA Cup final on 14 May, Liverpool won their first FA Cup since the 2006 final when they again defeated Chelsea, this time 6–5 on penalties, with Klopp becoming the first German manager to win the trophy. Liverpool would finish second in the Premier League by one point before losing 1–0 to Real Madrid in the 2022 UEFA Champions League final. With 92 points it was the third time under Klopp that Liverpool had exceeded 90 points in the league as he registered three of the club's four highest-ever league points totals.

==== 2022–2024: Complete set of trophies and departure ====
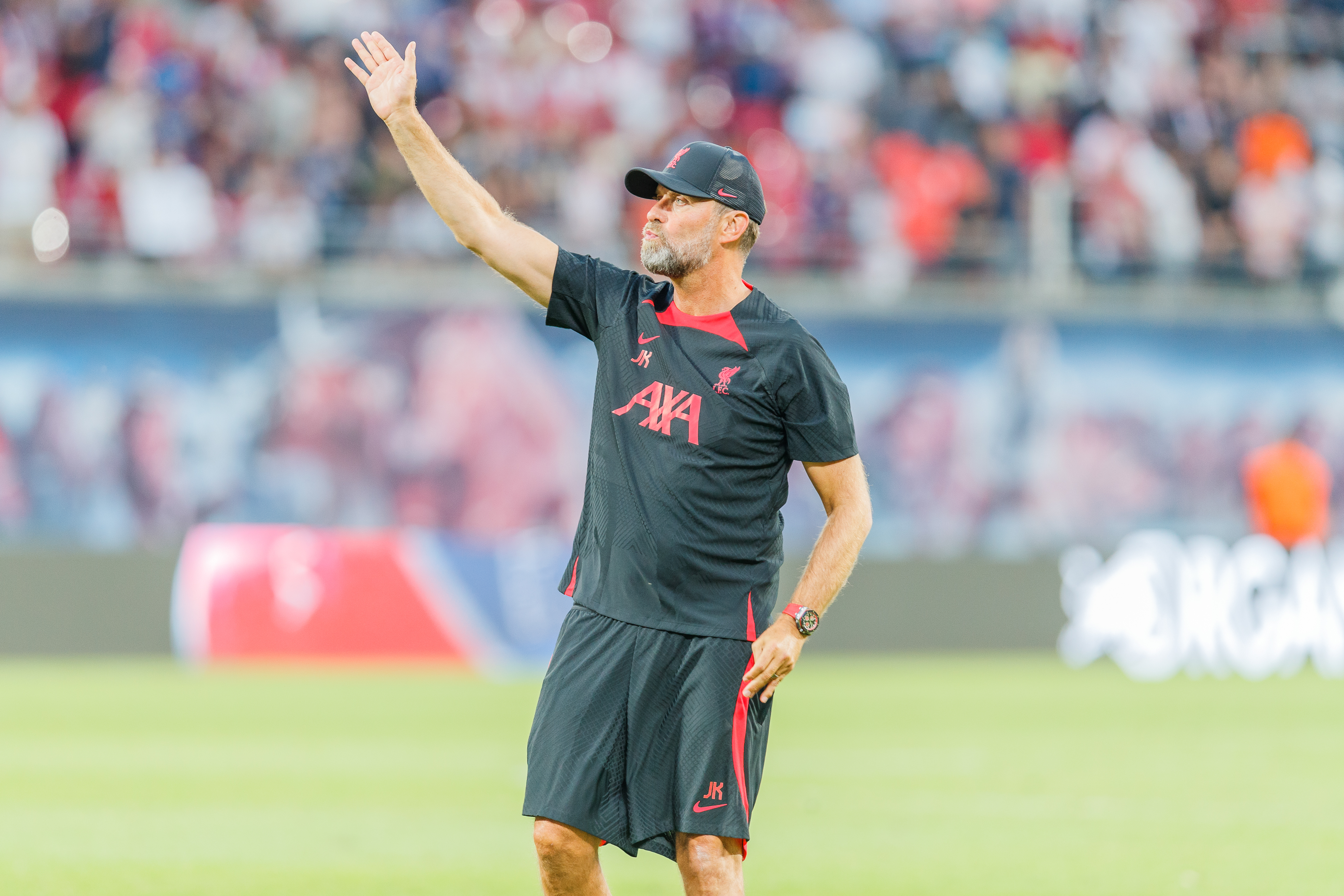
Klopp during a pre-season game against RB Leipzig in July 2022

On 30 July 2022, Liverpool opened the 2022–23 season by winning the 2022 FA Community Shield with a 3–1 win over Manchester City, in what was Klopp's first FA Community Shield. On 27 August, Klopp led Liverpool to a 9–0 win over Bournemouth, which was the joint-largest win in the history of the Premier League. On 12 October, Klopp led Liverpool to a 7–1 away victory over Rangers in the 2022–23 UEFA Champions League, with Mohamed Salah breaking Bafétimbi Gomis' record for the fastest Champions League hat-trick of all time.

On 5 March 2023, Liverpool recorded their biggest competitive win against Manchester United with a 7–0 victory at Anfield. This surpassed Liverpool's previous record set in October 1895, a 7–1 victory in the Second Division. Long-term injuries to players such as Thiago Alcântara throughout the season led to the emergence of academy player Curtis Jones as a regular presence in Liverpool's starting line-up towards the end of the season. At the end of the 2022–23 season, Liverpool narrowly missed out on UEFA Champions League qualification. It was suggested that reasons for this failure to qualify for the Champions League included the declining form of key members of the team and the vast amount of injuries suffered by Liverpool players. On 21 May 2023, addressing the reality of being in the Europa League next season, Klopp stated that Liverpool would "make [the Europa League] our competition".

On 26 January 2024, Klopp announced that he would depart his role as Liverpool manager after the conclusion of the 2023–24 season, and take a break from football management. He explained that he was "running out of energy" and that he "cannot do the job again and again and again and again". Klopp also mentioned he "wouldn't manage another team in England apart from Liverpool". Klopp led Liverpool to victory in the 2024 EFL Cup final, defeating Chelsea 1–0 to win his second League Cup.

The week approaching Klopp's final game for the club consisted of numerous media outlets releasing interviews and tributes surrounding his departure; Klopp describing it as "the most intense week". On 17 May 2024, Sky Sports Premier League released a YouTube video where past and present Liverpool players paid homage to Klopp with club legend Steven Gerrard, stating: "I hope there's a statue in the making" and Jamie Carragher stating that "Klopp is the Shankly of this era". His last match was a 2–0 win against Wolverhampton Wanderers at Anfield. At the start of the match fans banners and postered were seen across the Kop with a notable one saying: "Doubters. Believers. Conquerors." After the full-time whistle, an on-pitch appreciation award ceremony ensued with John W. Henry presenting awards to Klopp and his coaching team, and to retiring players Thiago Alcântara and Joël Matip. Klopp and his coaching team wore a red jumper with 'I'll Never Walk Alone Again' on the rear and 'Thank You Luv' on the front – a phrase he closely associates with the city of Liverpool. Klopp was showered with honours, and presented with replicas of all the trophies he has won in nearly nine years at the club before making a speech to the fans. During his speech he encouraged the fans to welcome and embrace the new manager, Arne Slot with belief; Klopp stating: "You welcome the new manager like you welcomed me. You go all-in from the first day. And you keep believing and you push the team. Change is good." He proceeded to chant "Arne Slot, La La La La La" (in the rhythm of Austrian band Opus's song "Live Is Life") and ignited the fans chanting. To end the ceremony, a rendition of "You'll Never Walk Alone" was sung by fans and the players whilst tears flowed throughout the stadium. The farewell celebrations were concluded with an event held M&S Bank Arena called "An evening with Jurgen Klopp", hosted by comedian John Bishop on 28 May 2024.

Whilst Klopp is no longer the manager of Liverpool, he remains connected to the club after becoming an ambassador of the LFC Foundation, the club's charity. In his post-match press conference following his final game in charge, he was quoted as saying "I don't imagine that the club will need my help in the future, but if the city needs me, I'm there."

On 31 July 2024, Klopp spoke to ESPN, publicly announcing his retirement, and stating he was "done" as a coach, a position that he reiterated during an interview with The Athletic in September 2025. Amid media speculation linking him to the Real Madrid head coach role in March 2026, Klopp denied these rumours and reaffirmed his commitment to his Red Bull position, but conceded that he was open to returning to management.

=== Germany ===
On 24 July 2026, Klopp was appointed manager of the Germany national team replacing Julian Nagelsmann. Klopp officially assumed the position on 15 August 2026, signing a contract valid until 2030.

== Manager profile ==
=== Tactics ===
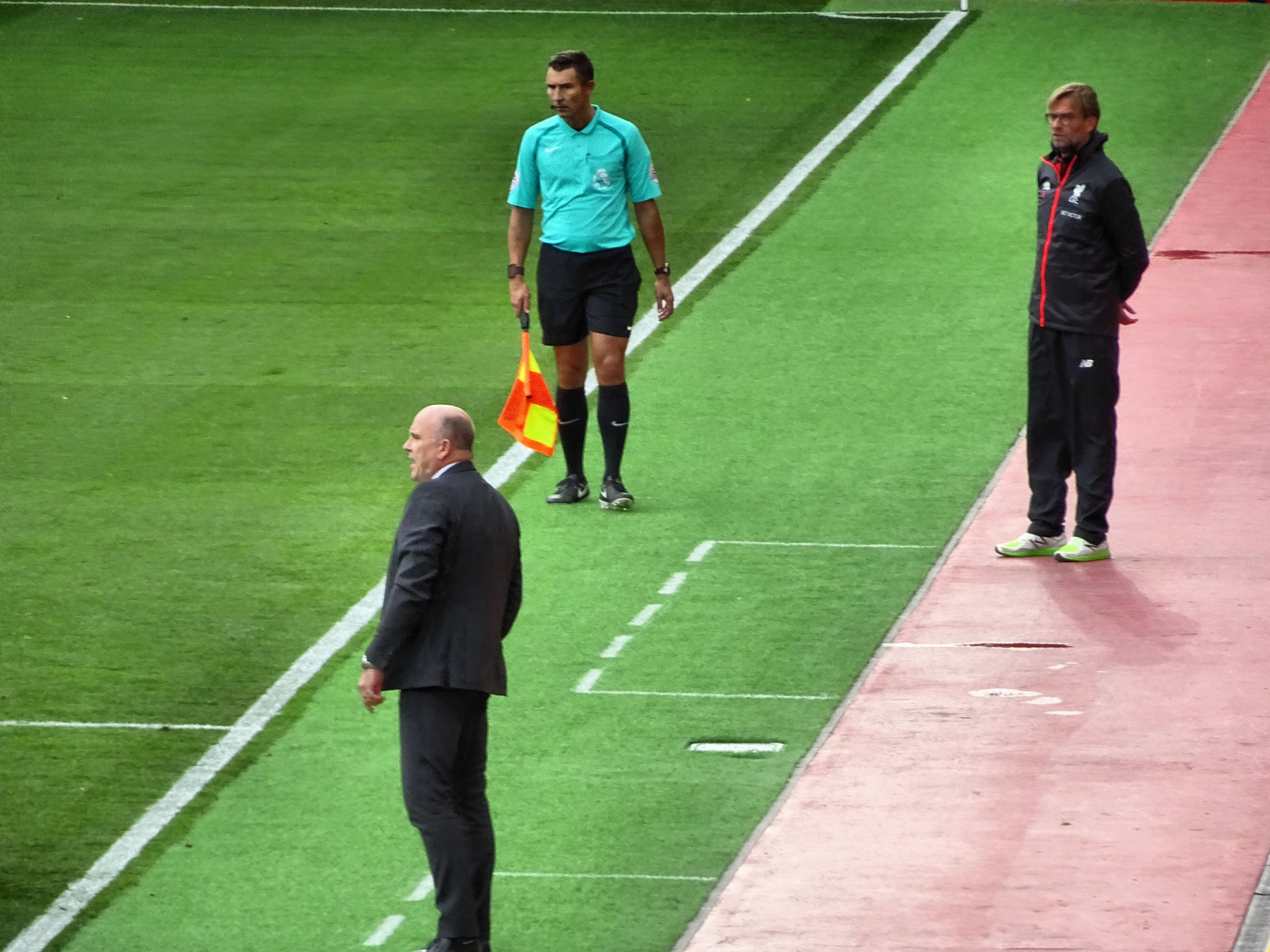
Klopp (right) managing Liverpool in 2016

Klopp is a notable proponent of Gegenpressing, a tactic in which the team immediately attempts to win back possession after losing the ball, rather than falling back to regroup. Klopp has stated that a well-executed counter-pressing system can be more effective than any playmaker when it comes to creating chances. Commenting on his pressing tactics, Klopp said that "The best moment to win the ball is immediately after your team just lost it. The opponent is still looking for orientation where to pass the ball. He will have taken his eyes off the game to make his tackle or interception and he will have expended energy. Both make him vulnerable". The tactic requires great amounts of speed, organisation and stamina, with the idea of regaining possession of the ball as far up the pitch as possible to counter possible counter-attacks. It also requires high levels of discipline: The team must be compact to close down spaces for the opponent to thread passes through, and must learn when to stop pressing to avoid exhaustion and protect from long balls passed into the space behind the pressing defence. Despite Klopp's pressing tactics resulting in a high attacking output, his Liverpool side was criticised at times for its inability to control games and tendency to concede goals as well as score them. However, Klopp developed his tactics to incorporate more possession based football and more defensive and midfield organisation, as well as overseeing the transfers of Alisson Becker, Virgil Van Dijk, Naby Keïta and Fabinho ahead of the 2018–19 season which saw Liverpool achieve their best league start in the club's history, and equal the all-time record for the fewest goals conceded at the mid-point of a top-flight season, conceding just 7 goals and keeping 12 clean sheets.

One of Klopp's main influences is Italian coach Arrigo Sacchi, whose ideas about the closing down of space in defence and the use of zones and reference points inspired the basis of Klopp's counter-pressing tactics, as well as Wolfgang Frank, his former coach during his time as a player for Mainz from 1995 to 1997 and then 1998 to 2000. Klopp himself said "I've never met Sacchi, but I learned everything I am as a coach from him and my former coach [Frank], who took it from Sacchi".

The importance of emotion is something Klopp has underlined throughout his managerial career, saying "Tactical things are so important, you cannot win without tactical things, but the emotion makes the difference". He believes that the players should embrace their emotions, describing how "[football is] the only sport where emotion has this big of an influence". Ahead of the Merseyside derby in 2016, Klopp said "The best football is always about expression of emotion". Klopp is known for his passionate and sometimes unrestrained behavior on the touchline and in interviews during and after matches. No other coach in the history of the Bundesliga has been sent off from the technical area or fined more frequently.

In his first two full seasons at Liverpool, Klopp almost exclusively employed a 4–3–3 formation, using a front three of wingers Mohamed Salah and Sadio Mané surrounding false-9 Roberto Firmino, supported by Philippe Coutinho in midfield. The foursome earned the moniker of the 'Fab Four' as they supplied the majority of the team's goals over this period of time. Roberto Firmino's exceptionally high number of tackles for a striker under Klopp's management encapsulates his style of play, demanding a high-press from all his players and having his striker defend from the front. Following Coutinho's departure in January 2018, the remaining front three increased their attacking output and continued to create chances as Salah won the Premier League Golden Boot in 2018, before sharing the award with his team-mate, Mané, in 2019. In the early part of the 2018–19 season Klopp, at times, used the 4–2–3–1 formation, which he had previously used at Dortmund. While this was partially to account for a number of injuries to key players, it also allowed Klopp to accommodate new signing Xherdan Shaqiri, playing Roberto Firmino in a more creative role and allowing Salah to play in a more central offensive position. However, for the remainder of the season, the 4–3–3 formation, as with the previous two seasons, became Klopp's preferred setup as his side finished as runners-up in the Premier League and reached a second consecutive Champions League final, where Klopp won his first Champions League title as a manager.

=== Reception ===
Klopp is often credited with pioneering the resurgence of Gegenpressing in modern football, and is regarded by fellow professional managers and players as one of the best managers in the world. In 2016, Guardiola suggested that Klopp could be "the best manager in the world at creating teams who attack". Klopp has also received praise for building competitive teams without spending as much as many direct rivals, placing emphasis on sustainability over purely short-term success.

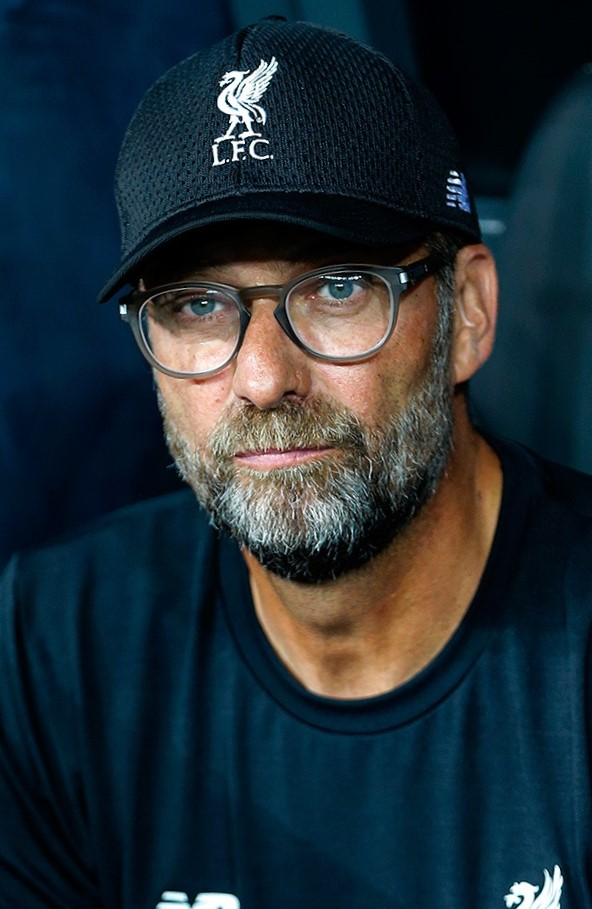
Klopp with Liverpool in 2019. His charismatic leadership was compared to former manager Bill Shankly.

As well as receiving plaudits for his tactics, Klopp is also highly regarded as a motivator, with Liverpool forward Roberto Firmino saying: "He motivates us in a different way every day", and being praised by Guardiola as a "huge motivator". In 2019, the chief executive of the League Managers Association (LMA) said that Klopp had 'redefined man-management' in the modern era, and highlighted his consistency in European competitions; in Klopp's first three European campaigns with Liverpool he was undefeated over two-legged knockout ties. Klopp was described by Jonathan Wilson of The Guardian as "a hugely charismatic figure who inspires players with his personality", while Vincent Hogan of the Irish Independent writes, "Not since Bill Shankly have Liverpool had a manager of such charisma".

Klopp has gained notoriety for his enthusiastic touchline celebrations. He received criticism in 2018 for taking things 'too far' when running on to the pitch to embrace Alisson Becker to celebrate an added time winner in the Merseyside derby. Pep Guardiola spoke in defence of Klopp, saying: "I did it against Southampton. There are a lot of emotions there in those moments".

In June 2020, Manchester United's record goalscorer Wayne Rooney responded to Klopp's dismissal of the suggestion that he could emulate Alex Ferguson's success at Manchester United, saying "Klopp says it's impossible for any club to dominate like United once did, but he is wrong. [...] I think if Klopp, who is only 53, stayed at Anfield for the next ten years, Liverpool would win at least five Premier League titles. He could keep building great sides because, as I mentioned, players join clubs to work with managers as good as him."

=== Colleagues ===
Klopp worked closely with Željko Buvač as his assistant manager, from 2001 until 2018. This 17-year collaboration spanned Klopp's tenures at German football clubs Mainz 05, Borussia Dortmund, and Liverpool. Buvač, a Bosnian former professional player, was often referred to as Klopp's right-hand man, and Klopp reportedly affectionately nicknamed Buvač as "the brain", to indicate his importance in the coaching setup. Buvač left Liverpool in 2018. The reason given by the club at the time was that he was going to spend time away from the club for "personal reasons". However, there were rumours even at the time that Buvač had fallen out with Klopp, and these seemed to be confirmed shortly after with reports that Buvač had taken issue with the increasing influence of Pep Lijnders on the coaching setup.

Another member of Klopp's inner circle is Peter Krawietz (de), who was assistant manager at Liverpool. Krawietz has effectively worked with Klopp since he joined his local club Mainz 05 as a video analyst in 1996. Klopp was still a Mainz 05 player at the time, and Krawietz would have been responsible for analysing players' performances. Krawietz was promoted to the role of chief scout in 2001 under Klopp's managerial tenure, and followed him to Borussia Dortmund in 2008, and then Liverpool in 2015. If Buvač was "the brain" of Klopp's operation, Krawietz is described as Klopp's "eyes". His role has been reported to be more behind the scenes, with a focus on analysis, scouting and set-pieces. Liverpool confirmed that Krawietz would leave Liverpool at the same time as Klopp, at the end of the 2023/24 season.

Pepijn Lijnders, known as 'Pep' for short, is another of Klopp's assistant managers. Lijnders was already at Liverpool when Klopp arrived in 2015, having joined the club the year before under Brendan Rodgers as under-16s coach, and then been named first-team development coach in the summer of 2015. A Dutchman himself, he left for the Eerste Divisie in January 2018, having accepted to manage Dutch club NEC Nijmegen. He rejoined Klopp's coaching staff at Liverpool in May 2018, as assistant manager. Lijnders is more hands-on, taking an active role in training sessions and being a vocal figure on the touchline. Klopp describes him as being "a real energiser". Lijnders has also confirmed he would leave Liverpool at the same time as Klopp, to pursue his own managerial career.

Other members of Klopp's coaching team include Vitor Matos who replaced Pep Lijnders as elite development coach, as well as first-team goalkeeping coach John Achterberg, assistant goalkeeping coaches Jack Robinson and former Brazilian international goalkeeper and World Cup winner Claudio Taffarel.

== Post-managerial career ==
In October 2024, Klopp signed with Red Bull as their new Head of Global Football. He started his new role on 1 January 2025 on a four-year contract. It was also reported his contract has an exit clause that allows him to apply for the Germany national team job. The move received widespread condemnation in Germany. Fans and journalists alike have criticized Klopp for joining an organisation that uses the multi-club model, something he has been critical of in the past.

On 1 October 2024, Klopp received the Federal Order of Merit from President Frank-Walter Steinmeier at Bellevue Palace in Berlin, for his contribution to democracy and his impact on the football world and more.

He was appointed an Honorary Commander of the Order of the British Empire (CBE) in 2025 for services to Football and the Community in Liverpool.

== Outside football ==
=== Personal life ===
Klopp has been married twice. He was previously wedded to Sabine with whom he has a child. On 5 December 2005, Klopp married social worker and children's writer Ulla Sandrock. They met at a pub during an Oktoberfest celebration that same year. On 10 February 2021, Klopp confirmed that his mother, Elisabeth, had died; he was unable to attend her funeral in Germany due to COVID-19 travel restrictions.

Klopp is close friends with fellow manager David Wagner, having first met him during their playing days at Mainz. Wagner served as best man at Klopp's 2005 wedding. Klopp said of their relationship: "In 1991 someone stuck us in a room together and that was the beginning of a life-long friendship!"

Klopp is a fan of rugby union, having shown his support for the South Africa national team due to his close personal friendship with their captain Siya Kolisi.

Klopp is a Lutheran who has referred to his religious faith in media interviews, stressing its importance. He said that he turned to religion more seriously after the death of his father, who was a Catholic, from liver cancer in 1998.

=== Media career ===
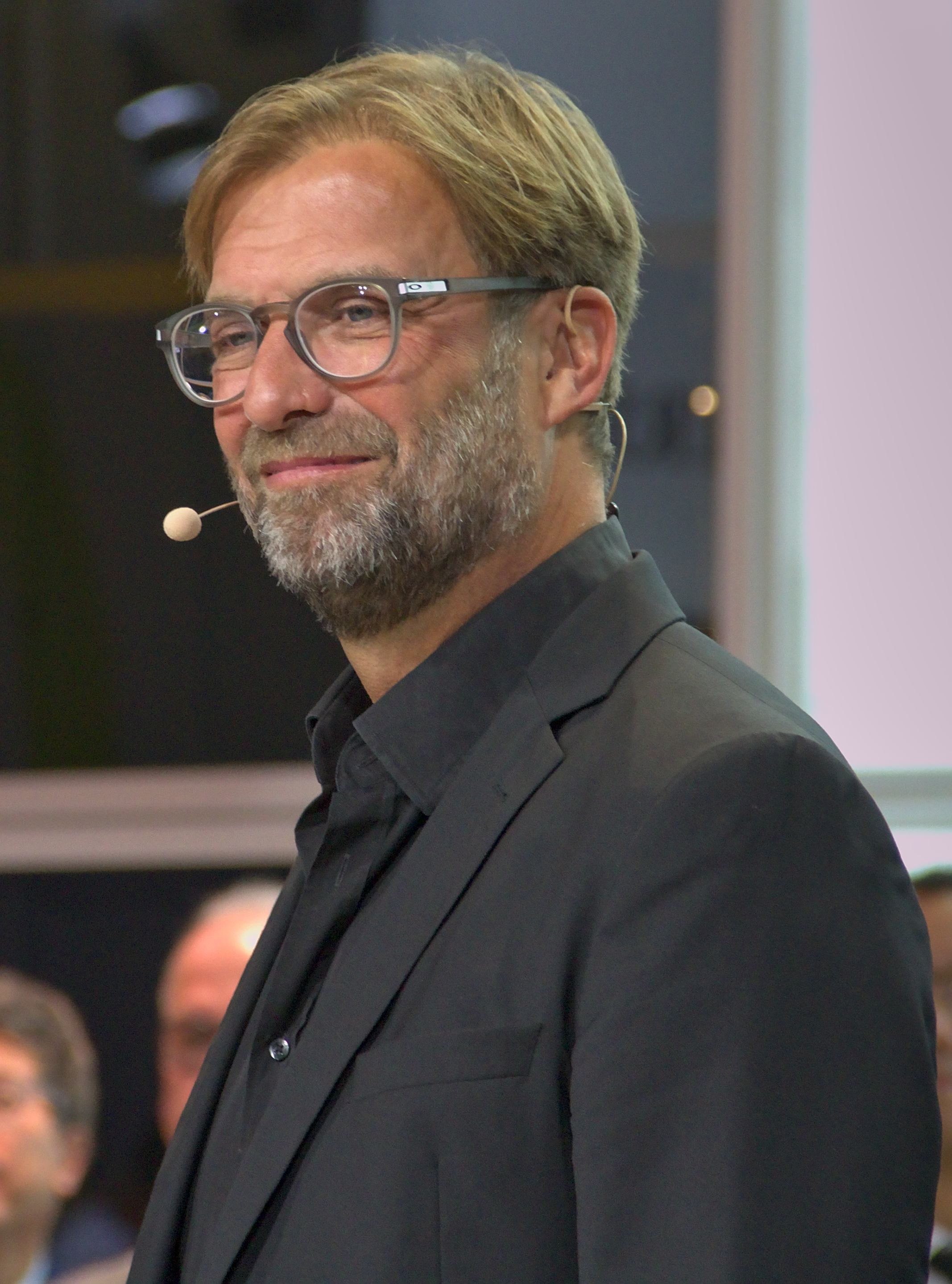
Klopp at Frankfurt Motor Show 2019

In 2005, Klopp was a regular expert commentator on the German television network ZDF, analysing the Germany national team. He worked as a match analyst during the 2006 FIFA World Cup, for which he received the Deutscher Fernsehpreis for "Best Sports Show" in October 2006, as well as Euro 2008. Klopp's term came to an end after the latter competition and he was succeeded by Oliver Kahn. During the 2010 World Cup, Klopp worked with RTL alongside Günther Jauch, for which Klopp again won the award for the same category. Klopp has also appeared in the documentary films Trainer! (2013) and Und vorne hilft der liebe Gott (2016). He later worked as a television pundit for MagentaTV's coverage of the 2026 FIFA World Cup.

=== Political views ===
In an interview for The Guardian in April 2018, Klopp expressed his opposition to Brexit, saying that it "makes no sense" and advocating a second referendum.

Politically, Klopp considers himself to be left-wing. He told journalist Raphael Honigstein:

I'm on the left, of course. More left than middle. I believe in the welfare state. I'm not privately insured. I would never vote for a party because they promised to lower the top tax rate. My political understanding is this: if I am doing well, I want others to do well, too. If there's something I will never do in my life it is vote for the right".

=== Endorsements ===
Klopp's popularity is used in advertisements by, among others, Puma, Opel and the German cooperative banking group Volksbanken-Raiffeisenbanken. According to Horizont, trade magazine for the German advertising industry, and the business weekly Wirtschaftswoche, Klopp's role as "brand ambassador" for Opel successfully helped the struggling carmaker to increase sales. He is also an ambassador for the German anti-racism campaign "Respekt! Kein Platz für Rassismus" ("Respect! No room for racism") and featured in a video for the song Komm hol die Pille raus by children's song author Volker Rosin to encourage young football talents. Klopp's brand ambassadorship to Deutsche Vermögensberatung (DVAG) was criticized and discredited for its business model and corporate culture by consumer advocates. He defended the DVAG and was a partner and brand ambassador for DVAG from 2015 until at least 2025. Starting in 2019, Klopp became an ambassador for Erdinger, a German brewery best known for its wheat beers. He featured in an advertising campaign for the beer, telling bartenders to "Never skim an Erdinger." After Liverpool's title win in 2020, the Brewery also produced a special limited edition series of cans featuring Klopp's face and autograph, which sold out quickly online. In 2020, Klopp signed a personal endorsement deal with Adidas, agreeing to become a brand ambassador and wearing their footwear in training sessions and future advertisements. In 2021 he appeared in an ad for Snickers. In October 2024, Trivago named Klopp as the face of their new global marketing campaign.

== Career statistics ==
Appearances and goals by club, season and competition
Club	Season	League			DFB-Pokal		Other		Total	
Club	Season	Division	Apps	Goals	Apps	Goals	Apps	Goals	Apps	Goals
Rot-Weiss Frankfurt	1989–90	Oberliga Hessen	0	0	1	0	5 (Note: Appearances in Aufstiegsrunde 2. Bundesliga (promotion play-offs))	0	6	0
Mainz 05	1990–91	2. Bundesliga	33	10	0	0	—		33	10
Mainz 05	1991–92	2. Bundesliga	32 (Note: Appearances in 2. Bundesliga Süd as the league was split into a 'North' and 'South' due to the merging of clubs from former East Germany)	8	1	0	—		33	8
Mainz 05	1992–93	2. Bundesliga	41	3	2	1	—		43	4
Mainz 05	1993–94	2. Bundesliga	34	7	1	1	—		35	8
Mainz 05	1994–95	2. Bundesliga	33	7	3	1	—		36	8
Mainz 05	1995–96	2. Bundesliga	29	2	2	0	—		31	2
Mainz 05	1996–97	2. Bundesliga	24	3	0	0	—		24	3
Mainz 05	1997–98	2. Bundesliga	31	4	1	1	—		32	5
Mainz 05	1998–99	2. Bundesliga	29	4	1	0	—		30	4
Mainz 05	1999–2000	2. Bundesliga	30	4	3	0	—		33	4
Mainz 05	2000–01	2. Bundesliga	9	0	1	0	—		10	0
Mainz 05	Total		325	52	15	4	0	0	340	56
Career total			325	52	16	4	5	0	346	56

== Managerial statistics ==
As of match played 16 November 2026

Managerial record by team and tenure
Team	From	To	Record					Ref.
Team	From	To	P	W	D	L	Win %	Ref.
Mainz 05	27 February 2001	30 June 2008	270	109	78	83	40.4	
Borussia Dortmund	1 July 2008	30 June 2015	319	180	69	70	56.4	
Liverpool	8 October 2015	31 May 2024	491	299	109	83	60.9	
Germany	15 August 2026	present	6	3	2	1	50.0	
Total			1,086	591	258	237	54.4	

== Honours ==
Mainz 05

- 2. Bundesliga third-place promotion: 2003–04

Borussia Dortmund

- Bundesliga: 2010–11, 2011–12
- DFB-Pokal: 2011–12; runner-up: 2013–14, 2014–15
- DFL-Supercup: 2013, 2014
- UEFA Champions League runner-up: 2012–13

Liverpool

- Premier League: 2019–20
- FA Cup: 2021–22
- Football League Cup/EFL Cup: 2021–22, 2023–24; runner-up: 2015–16
- FA Community Shield: 2022
- UEFA Champions League: 2018–19; runner-up: 2017–18, 2021–22
- UEFA Super Cup: 2019
- FIFA Club World Cup: 2019
- UEFA Europa League runner-up: 2015–16

Individual

- German Football Manager of the Year: 2011, 2012, 2019
- VDV Bundesliga Coach of the Season: 2010–11
- Deutscher Fernsehpreis: 2006, 2010
- Onze d'Or Coach of the Year: 2019
- The Best FIFA Men's Coach: 2019, 2020
- IFFHS World's Best Club Coach: 2019
- IFFHS Men's World Team: 2019
- World Soccer Awards World Manager of the Year: 2019
- Globe Soccer Awards Best Coach of the Year: 2019
- LMA Hall of Fame: 2019
- LMA Manager of the Year: 2019–20, 2021–22
- Premier League Manager of the Season: 2019–20, 2021–22
- Premier League Manager of the Month: September 2016, December 2018, March 2019, August 2019, September 2019, November 2019, December 2019, January 2020, May 2021, January 2024
- BBC Sports Personality of the Year Coach Award: 2020
- Freedom of the City of Liverpool: 2022
- Order of Merit of the Federal Republic of Germany: 2024
- Honorary Commander of the Order of the British Empire: 2025

== See also ==
- List of European Cup and UEFA Champions League winning managers
- List of English football championship-winning managers
- List of football managers with the most matches
- List of FIFA Club World Cup winning managers
- List of UEFA Super Cup winning managers
- List of DFB-Pokal winning managers
- List of FA Cup winning managers
