= List of FIFA Club World Cup winning managers =

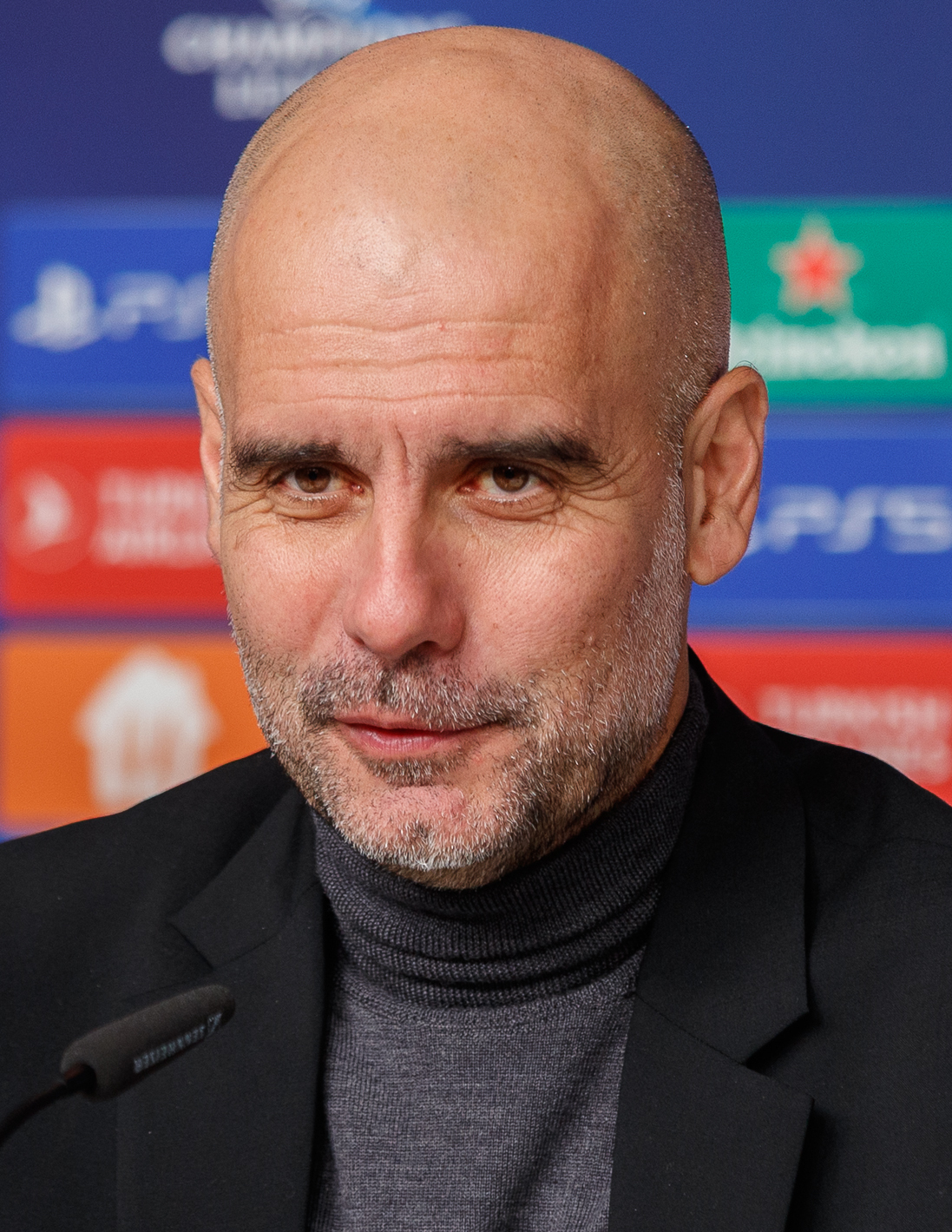
- Pep Guardiola became the first manager to win the FIFA Club World Cup four times as manager, a competition record. He is also the first manager to win the tournament with three clubs.
- Founded: 2000
- Region: International (FIFA)

The FIFA Club World Cup is an international association football competition organised by the Fédération Internationale de Football Association (FIFA), the sport's global governing body. The championship was first contested as the FIFA Club World Championship in 2000. It was not held between 2001 and 2004 due to a combination of factors, most importantly the collapse of FIFA's marketing partner International Sport and Leisure. Following a change in format which saw the FIFA Club World Championship absorb the Intercontinental Cup, it was relaunched in 2005 and took its current name the season afterwards.

The current format of the tournament, in use since the competition was revamped ahead of the 2025 edition, features 32 teams competing for the title at venues within the host nation; 12 teams from Europe, 6 from South America, 4 from Asia, 4 from Africa, 4 from North, Central America and Caribbean, 1 from Oceania, and 1 team from the host nation. The teams are drawn into eight groups of four, with each team playing three group stage matches in a round-robin format. The top two teams from each group advance to the knockout stage, starting with the round of 16 and culminating with the final.

Pep Guardiola was the first manager to win the tournament on four occasions; he led Spanish club Barcelona to success in 2009 and 2011, coached German side Bayern Munich to victory in 2013, and won a fourth title with English club Manchester City to victory in 2023. He is also the first manager to win the tournament with three clubs. Carlo Ancelotti has won three titles (once with Milan in 2007, twice with Real Madrid in 2014 and 2022), Zinedine Zidane has won two titles (in 2016 and 2017, both with Real Madrid), and eleven other managers have each won the competition once. Enzo Maresca is the most recent manager to have won the FIFA Club World Cup, doing so with Chelsea in the 2025 edition.

== List of managers in the final ==
Brazilian, Spanish and German managers hold the joint-record for most consecutive appearances of winning coaches, with three back-to-back triumphs each; a Brazilian manager won the final in 2000, 2005 and 2006, a Spanish manager did so in 2009, 2010 and 2011, while a German manager accomplished the feat in 2019, 2020 and 2021. Spanish managers have won also won the most total finals, with six (the aforementioned three, plus in 2013, 2015 and 2023).

Rafael Benítez of Spain became the first manager to reach the FIFA Club World Cup final with a foreign club, when English side Liverpool side lost the 2005 final under his leadership; he led other foreign clubs to the final on two further occasions, winning in 2010 with Italian side Internazionale and losing in 2012 with English team Chelsea. Sir Alex Ferguson, Pep Guardiola, Carlo Ancelotti, Zinedine Zidane, Santiago Solari, Jürgen Klopp and Thomas Tuchel are the other managers to win the final with a foreign club, with Ancelotti (2014 and 2022), Zidane (2016 and 2017) and Guardiola (2013 and 2023) the only ones to accomplish this on multiple occasions, Ancelotti and Zidane while managing Real Madrid, and Guardiola while managing Bayern Munich and Manchester City.

Along with Ancelotti and Zidane, Guardiola is the only other manager to have led the same club to the final on more than one occasion, coming out victorious with Barcelona in 2009 and 2011. He also won the final in 2013 as coach of Bayern Munich and in 2023 as coach of Manchester City, becoming the first manager to win the trophy four times and also the first manager to win the trophy with three clubs.

The inaugural final in 2000 remains the only one to see two managers from the same nation, with both hailing from Brazil.

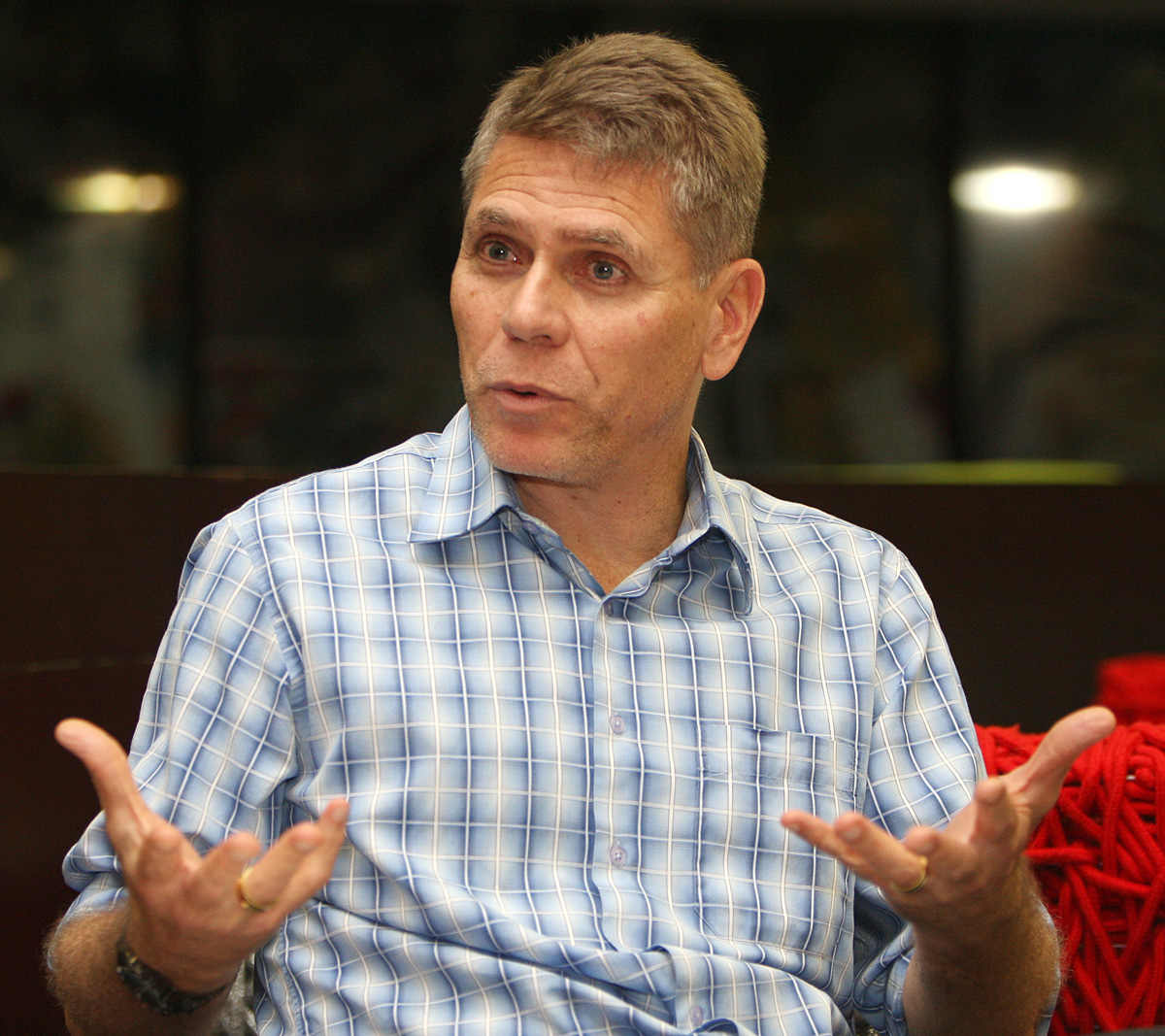
Paulo Autuori was the first manager to defeat a European club in the final, leading São Paulo to victory over Liverpool in 2005.

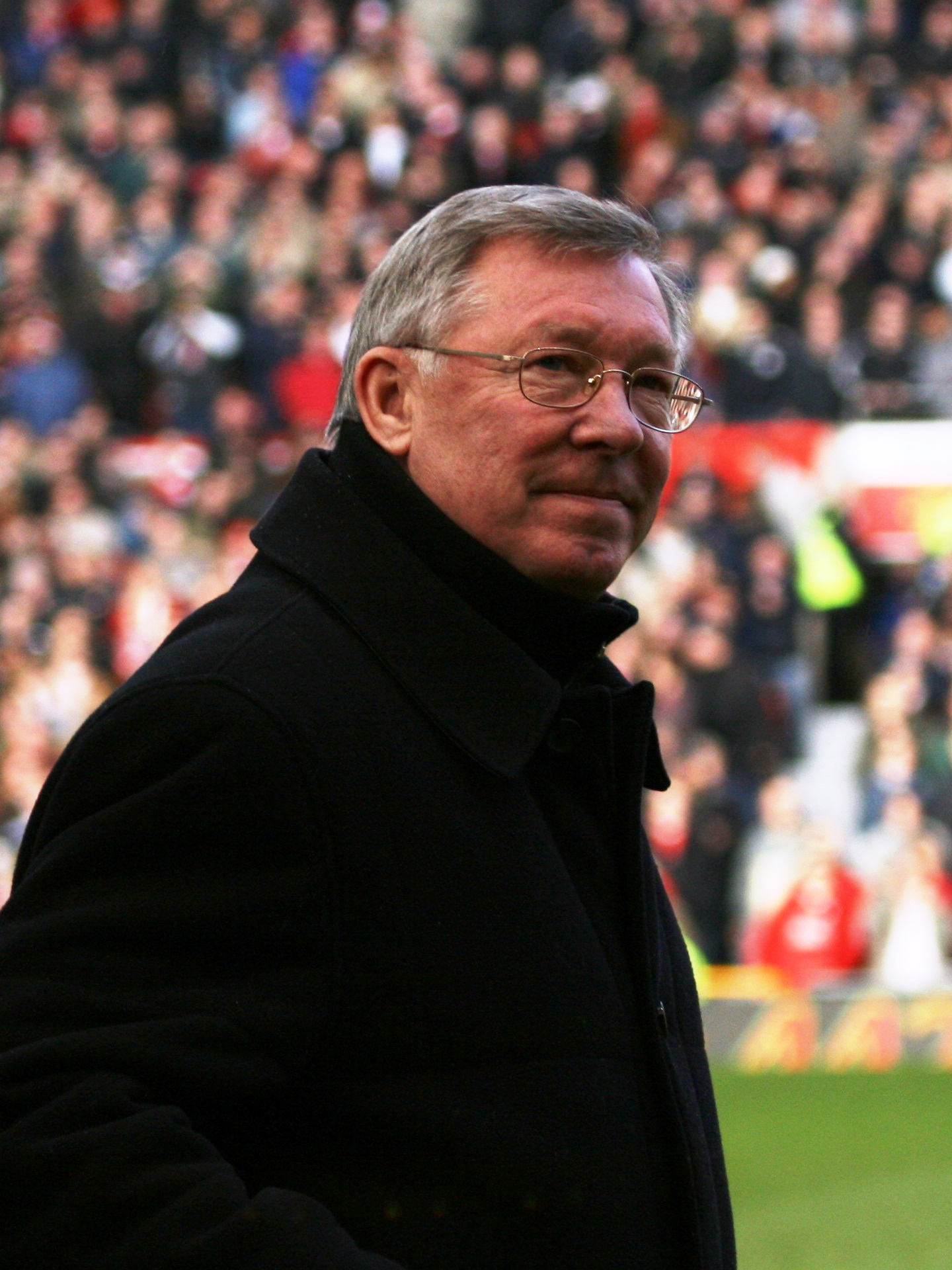
Scottish manager Sir Alex Ferguson was the first to become world champion with a club from outside his home nation, leading English side Manchester United to the 2008 FIFA Club World Cup title.

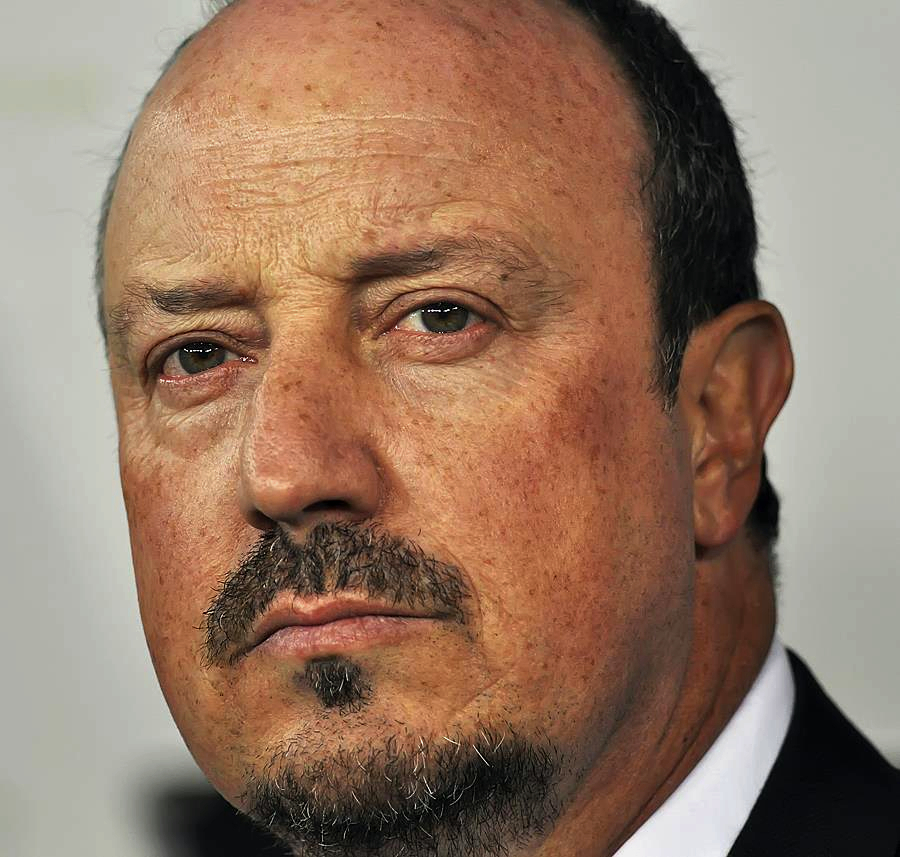
Rafael Benítez led three clubs to the decisive match of the competition, a record that he today shares with Pep Guardiola.

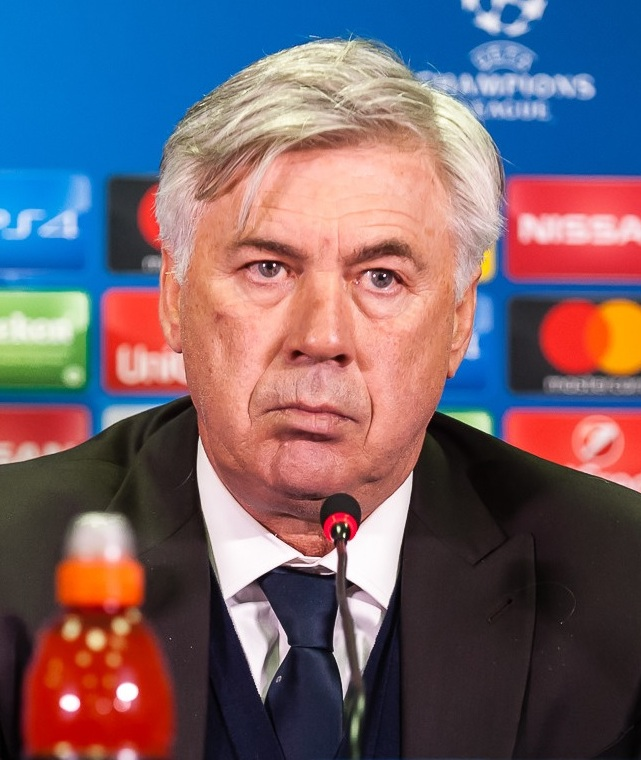
Carlo Ancelotti became the first manager to win the FIFA Club World Cup for a European club, doing so with Milan in 2007.

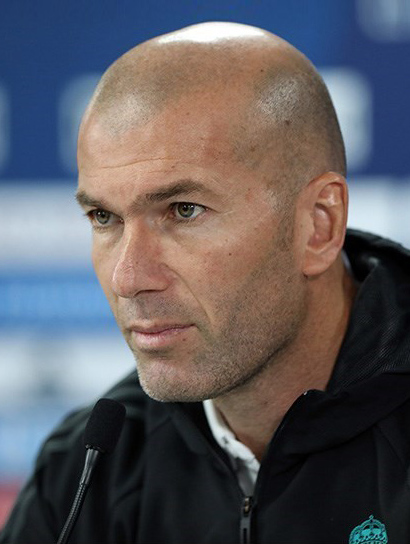
Zinedine Zidane was the first manager to win consecutive FIFA Club World Cup titles, which he accomplished with Real Madrid in 2016 and 2017.

List of FIFA Club World Cup Final managers by edition
Final	Nat.	Manager	Club	Nat.	Manager	Club	Ref(s)
Final	Winner			Runner-up			Ref(s)
2000	(Brazil)	Oswaldo de Oliveira	(Brazil) Corinthians	(Brazil)	Antônio Lopes	(Brazil) Vasco da Gama	
2005	(Brazil)	Paulo Autuori	(Brazil) São Paulo	(Spain)	Rafael Benítez	(England) Liverpool	
2006	(Brazil)	Abel Braga	(Brazil) Internacional	(Netherlands)	Frank Rijkaard	(Spain) Barcelona	
2007	(Italy)	Carlo Ancelotti	(Italy) Milan	(Argentina)	Miguel Ángel Russo	(Argentina) Boca Juniors	
2008	(Scotland)	Sir Alex Ferguson	(England) Manchester United	(Argentina)	Edgardo Bauza	(Ecuador) LDU Quito	
2009	(Spain)	Pep Guardiola	(Spain) Barcelona	(Argentina)	Alejandro Sabella	(Argentina) Estudiantes	
2010	(Spain)	Rafael Benítez	(Italy) Internazionale	(Senegal)	Lamine N'Diaye	(Democratic Republic of the Congo) TP Mazembe	
2011	(Spain)	Pep Guardiola	(Spain) Barcelona	(Brazil)	Muricy Ramalho	(Brazil) Santos	
2012	(Brazil)	Tite	(Brazil) Corinthians	(Spain)	Rafael Benítez	(England) Chelsea	
2013	(Spain)	Pep Guardiola	(Germany) Bayern Munich	(Tunisia)	Faouzi Benzarti	(Morocco) Raja Casablanca	
2014	(Italy)	Carlo Ancelotti	(Spain) Real Madrid	(Argentina)	Edgardo Bauza	(Argentina) San Lorenzo	
2015	(Spain)	Luis Enrique	(Spain) Barcelona	(Argentina)	Marcelo Gallardo	(Argentina) River Plate	
2016	(France)	Zinedine Zidane	(Spain) Real Madrid	(Japan)	Masatada Ishii	(Japan) Kashima Antlers	
2017	(France)	Zinedine Zidane	(Spain) Real Madrid	(Brazil)	Renato Gaúcho	(Brazil) Grêmio	
2018	(Argentina)	Santiago Solari	(Spain) Real Madrid	(Croatia)	Zoran Mamić	(United Arab Emirates) Al-Ain	
2019	(Germany)	Jürgen Klopp	(England) Liverpool	(Portugal)	Jorge Jesus	(Brazil) Flamengo	
2020	(Germany)	Hansi Flick	(Germany) Bayern Munich	(Brazil)	Ricardo Ferretti	(Mexico) UANL	
2021	(Germany)	Thomas Tuchel	(England) Chelsea	(Portugal)	Abel Ferreira	(Brazil) Palmeiras	
2022	(Italy)	Carlo Ancelotti	(Spain) Real Madrid	(Argentina)	Ramón Díaz	(Saudi Arabia) Al-Hilal	
2023	(Spain)	Pep Guardiola	(England) Manchester City	(Brazil)	Fernando Diniz	(Brazil) Fluminense	
2025	(Italy)	Enzo Maresca	(England) Chelsea	(Spain)	Luis Enrique	(France) Paris Saint-Germain	

== Results by manager ==
Pep Guardiola is the only manager to have won four FIFA Club World Cups; he won twice with Barcelona, once with Bayern Munich and once with Manchester City. He is also the first manager to win the tournament with three clubs. Guardiola also holds the record for the most appearances in the final, with the aforementioned four. Lamine N'Diaye of Senegal in 2010, Faouzi Benzarti of Tunisia in 2013 and Masatada Ishii of Japan in 2016 were the only non-European and non-South American managers to have appeared in the final. The aforementioned three managers, as well as Zoran Mamić in 2018, Ricardo Ferretti in 2020 and Ramón Díaz in 2022, are the only ones to have led a club outside Europe and South America into the decisive match.

Performance by manager
Manager	Won	Runner-up	Years won	Years runner-up
(Spain) Pep Guardiola	4	0	2009, 2011, 2013, 2023	—
(Italy) Carlo Ancelotti	3	0	2007, 2014, 2022	—
(France) Zinedine Zidane	2	0	2016, 2017	—
(Spain) Rafael Benítez	1	2	2010	2005, 2012
(Spain) Luis Enrique	1	1	2015	2025
(Brazil) Oswaldo de Oliveira	1	0	2000	—
(Brazil) Paulo Autuori	1	0	2005	—
(Brazil) Abel Braga	1	0	2006	—
(Scotland) Sir Alex Ferguson	1	0	2008	—
(Brazil) Tite	1	0	2012	—
(Argentina) Santiago Solari	1	0	2018	—
(Germany) Jürgen Klopp	1	0	2019	—
(Germany) Hansi Flick	1	0	2020	—
(Germany) Thomas Tuchel	1	0	2021	—
(Italy) Enzo Maresca	1	0	2025	—
(Argentina) Edgardo Bauza	0	2	—	2008, 2014
(Brazil) Antônio Lopes	0	1	—	2000
(Netherlands) Frank Rijkaard	0	1	—	2006
(Argentina) Miguel Ángel Russo	0	1	—	2007
(Argentina) Alejandro Sabella	0	1	—	2009
(Senegal) Lamine N'Diaye	0	1	—	2010
(Brazil) Muricy Ramalho	0	1	—	2011
(Tunisia) Faouzi Benzarti	0	1	—	2013
(Argentina) Marcelo Gallardo	0	1	—	2015
(Japan) Masatada Ishii	0	1	—	2016
(Brazil) Renato Gaúcho	0	1	—	2017
(Croatia) Zoran Mamić	0	1	—	2018
(Portugal) Jorge Jesus	0	1	—	2019
(Brazil) Ricardo Ferretti	0	1	—	2020
(Portugal) Abel Ferreira	0	1	—	2021
(Argentina) Ramón Díaz	0	1	—	2022
(Brazil) Fernando Diniz	0	1	—	2023

== Results by nationality ==
Spanish managers have had the most success in the competition, amassing six titles in nine total final appearances. Brazilian and Italian managers have each won four titles, German managers have won three, French managers have won two, and a Scottish manager has won the title once. Argentine managers hold the dubious record of the most losses in the final with six, including defeats in three consecutive editions; a manager from Argentina has only won the competition on one occasion.

Performance by nationality
Nationality	Finalists	Winners	Runners-up
Spain	9	6	3
Brazil	9	4	5
Italy	4	4	0
Germany	3	3	0
France	2	2	0
Argentina	7	1	6
Scotland	1	1	0
Portugal	2	0	2
Croatia	1	0	1
Japan	1	0	1
Netherlands	1	0	1
Senegal	1	0	1
Tunisia	1	0	1

== Results by continent ==
European managers remain the most successful of the competition, with a total of sixteen titles. Their South American counterparts are second with five titles, while Africa has had two managers lead a club into the final, and Asia has had one.

Performance by continent
Continent	Finalists	Winners	Runners-up
Europe	23	16	7
South America	16	5	11
Africa	2	0	2
Asia	1	0	1

== See also ==
- List of FIFA Club World Cup finals
