= FIFA Club World Cup records and statistics =

- Founded: 2000
- Region: International (FIFA)

The FIFA Club World Cup is an international association football competition organised by the Fédération Internationale de Football Association (FIFA). The championship was first contested as the FIFA Club World Championship in 2000. It was not held between 2001 and 2004 due to a combination of factors, most importantly the collapse of FIFA's marketing partner International Sport and Leisure. Following a change in format which saw the FIFA Club World Championship absorb the Intercontinental Cup, it was relaunched in 2005 and took its current name the season afterwards.

The current format of the tournament, in use since the competition was revamped ahead of the 2025 edition, features 32 teams competing for the title at venues within the host nation; 12 teams from Europe, 6 from South America, 4 from Asia, 4 from Africa, 4 from North, Central America and Caribbean, 1 from Oceania, and 1 team from the host nation. The teams are drawn into eight groups of four, with each team playing three group stage matches in a round-robin format. The top two teams from each group advance to the knockout stage, starting with the round of 16 and culminating with the final.

This page details the records and statistics of the FIFA Club World Cup, a collection, organization, analysis, interpretation, and presentation of data pertaining to the tournament. As a general rule, statistics should ideally be added after the end of a FIFA Club World Cup edition.

== General performances ==
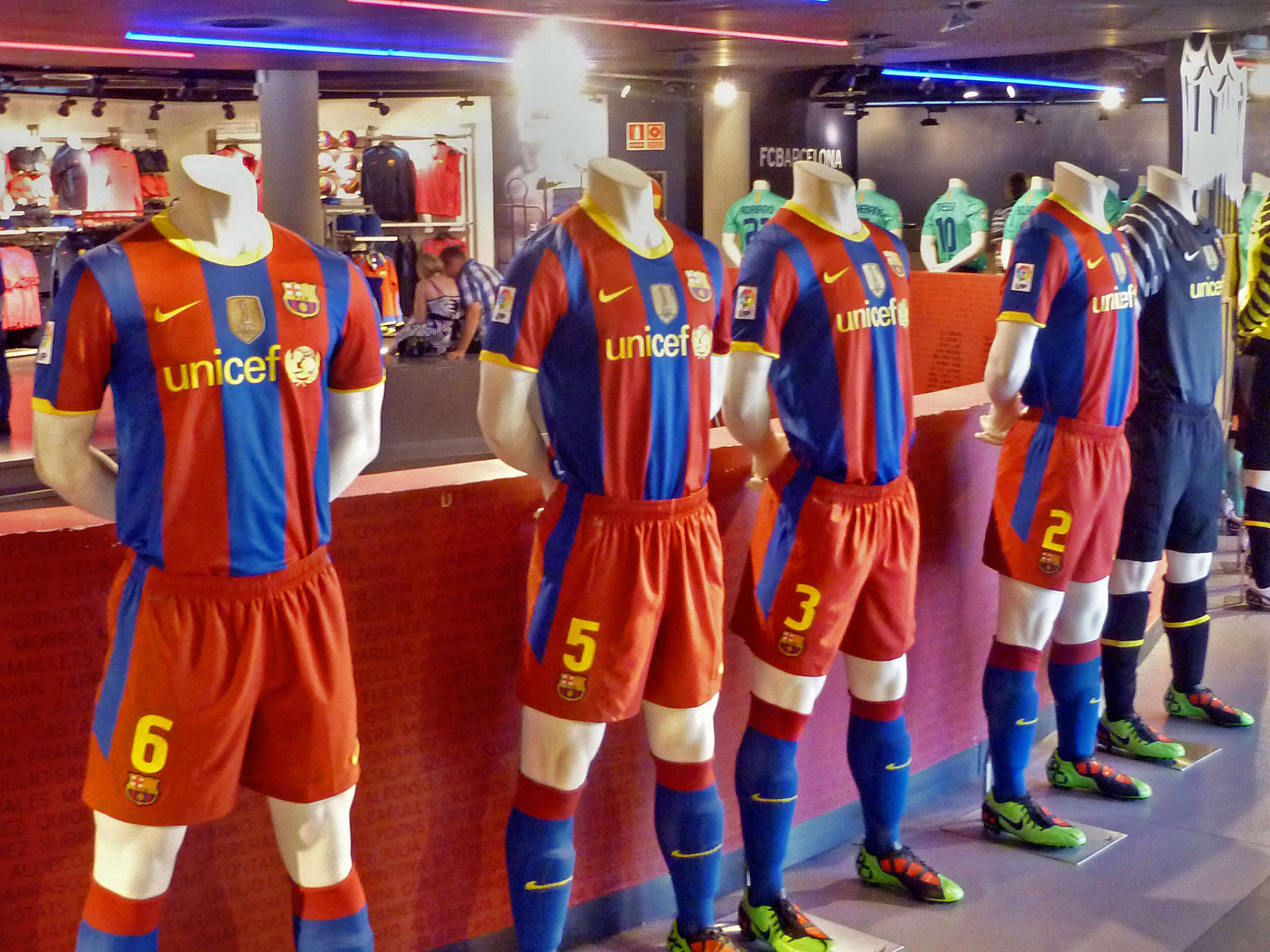
Barcelona played in four finals, with appearances in 2006, 2009, 2011 and 2015.

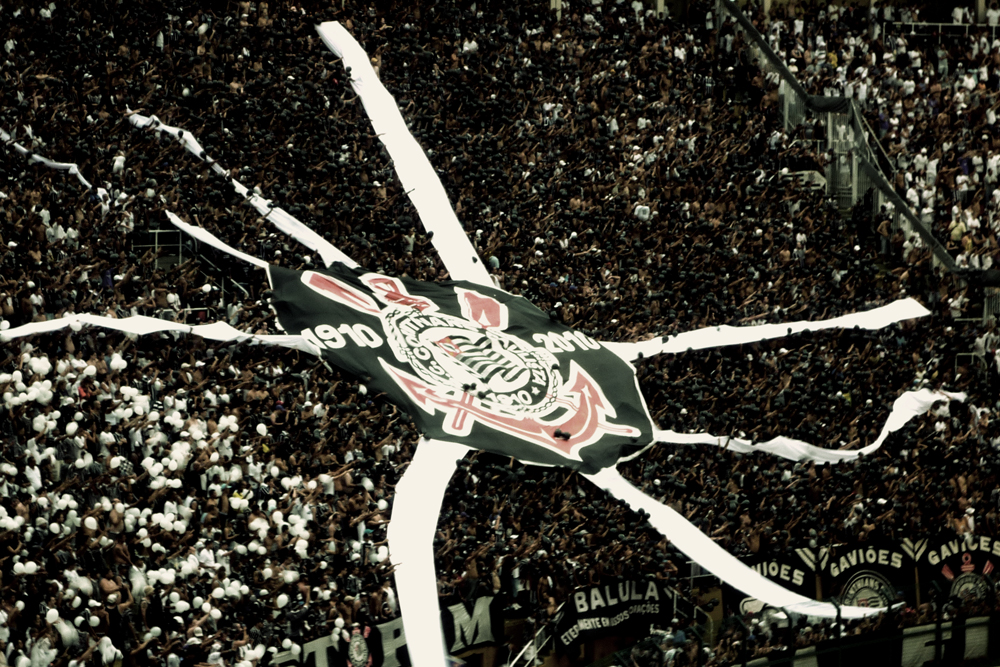
Corinthians are one of only two clubs to have appeared in more than one final and have a flawless record, winning the 2000 and 2012 editions. The Timão is also the only world champion that qualified to the Club World Cup by merit of being the host nation's national champions.

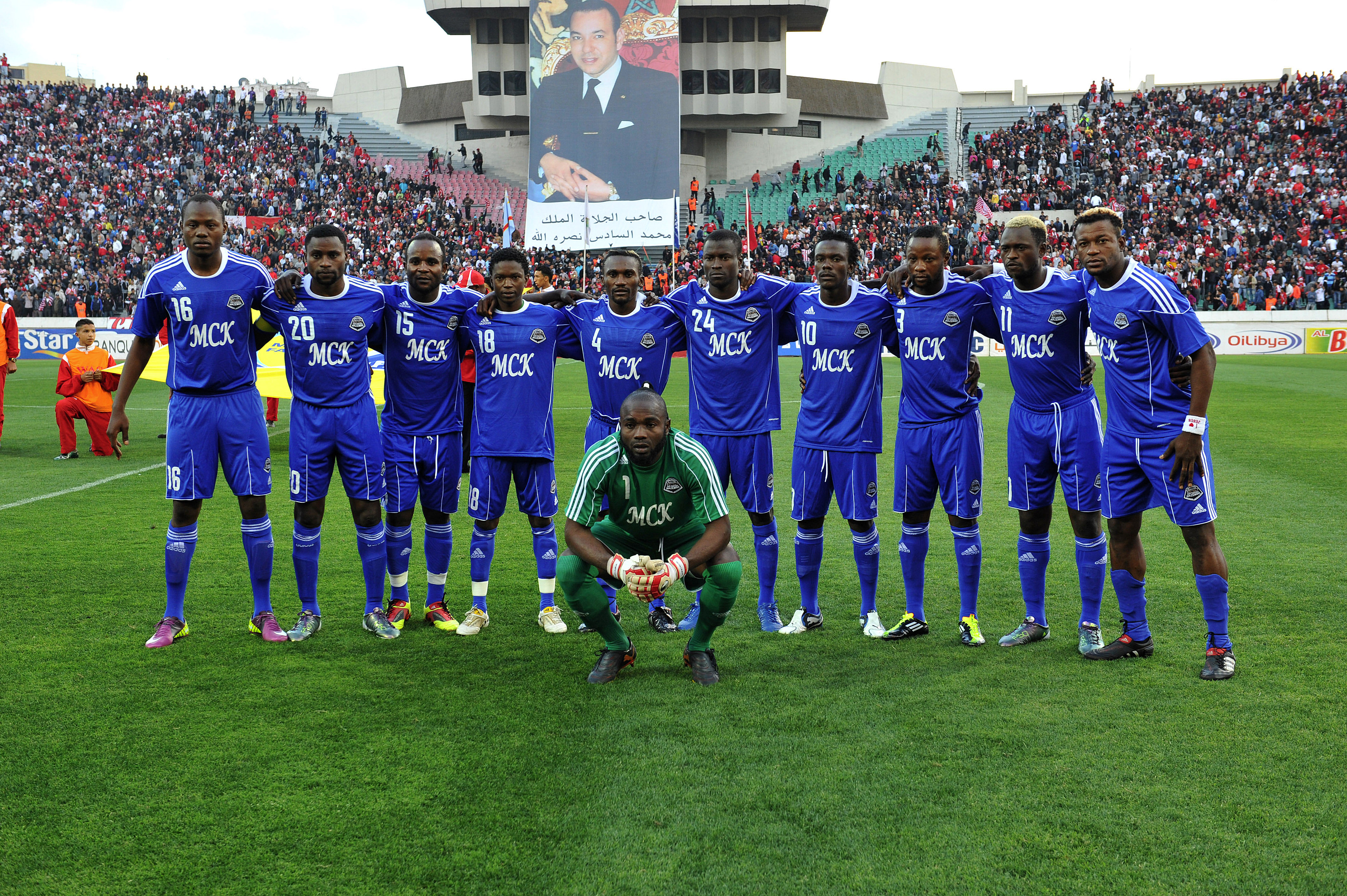
TP Mazembe became the first team from outside Europe and South America to reach the final. Les Corbeaux accomplished this feat in 2010 when they defeated Internacional.

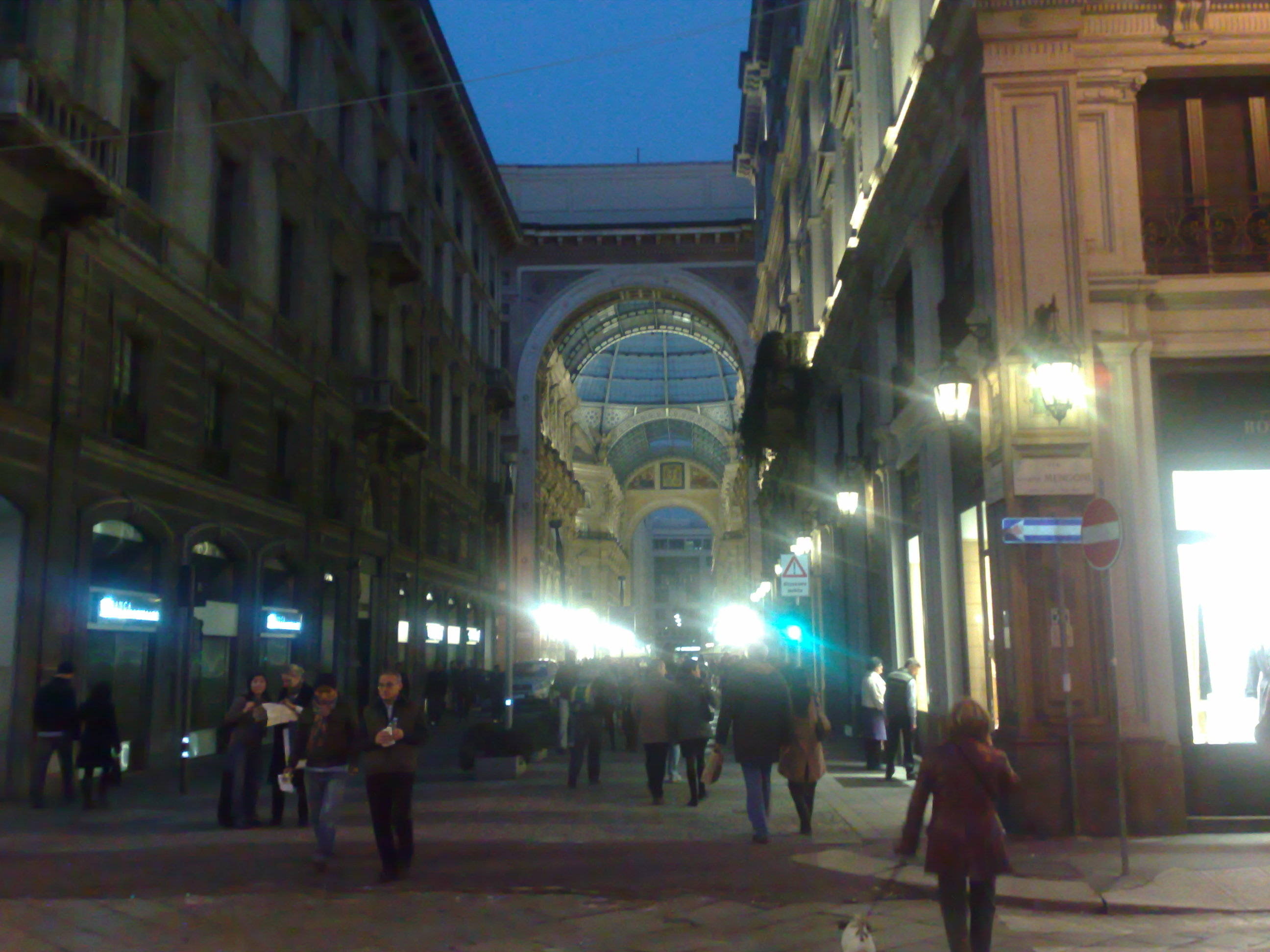
Milan, along with São Paulo and Manchester, are the only cities which have had more than one representative win the FIFA Club World Cup.

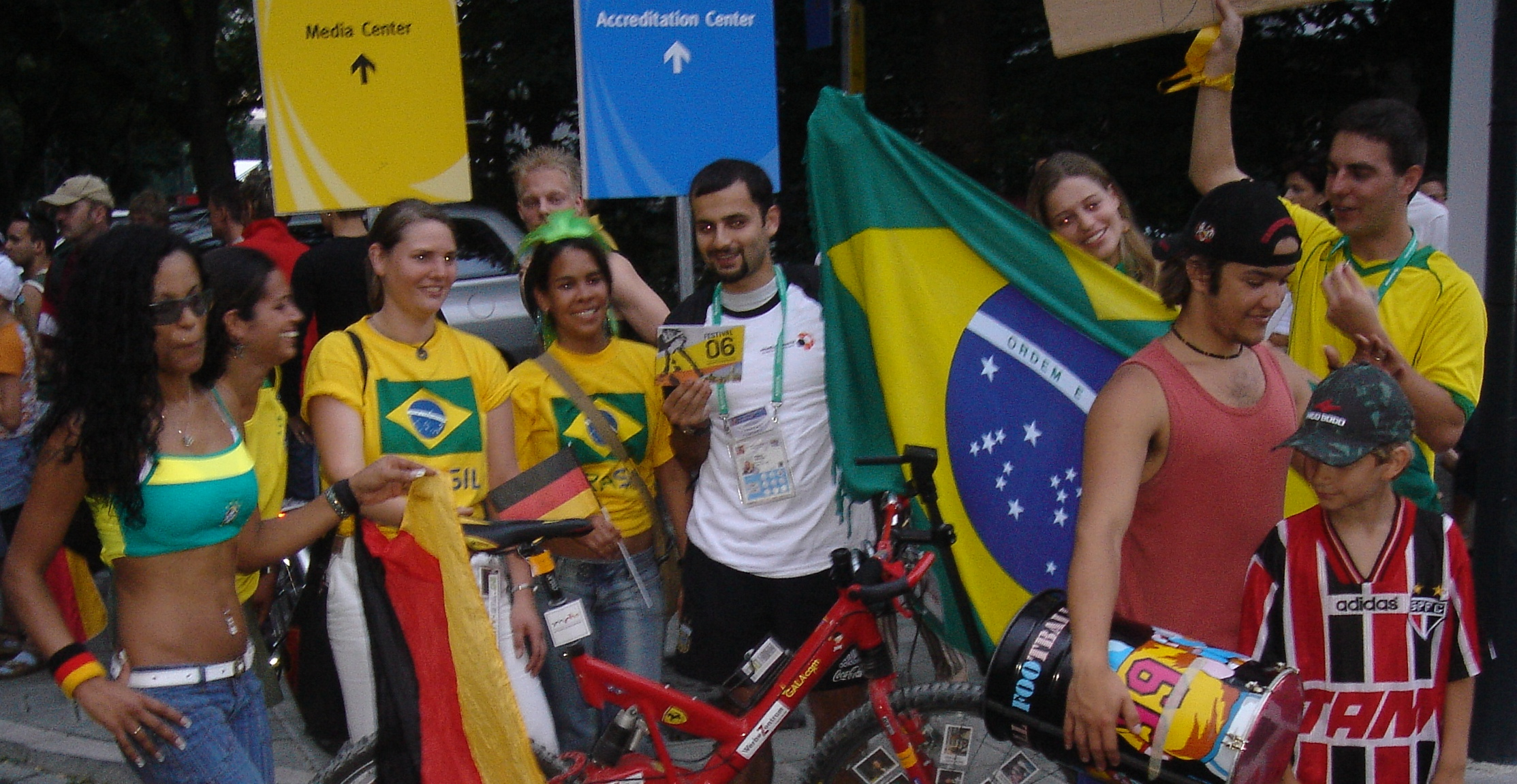
Brazil's Brasileirão is the third-strongest national league of the competition, with four titles to its name.

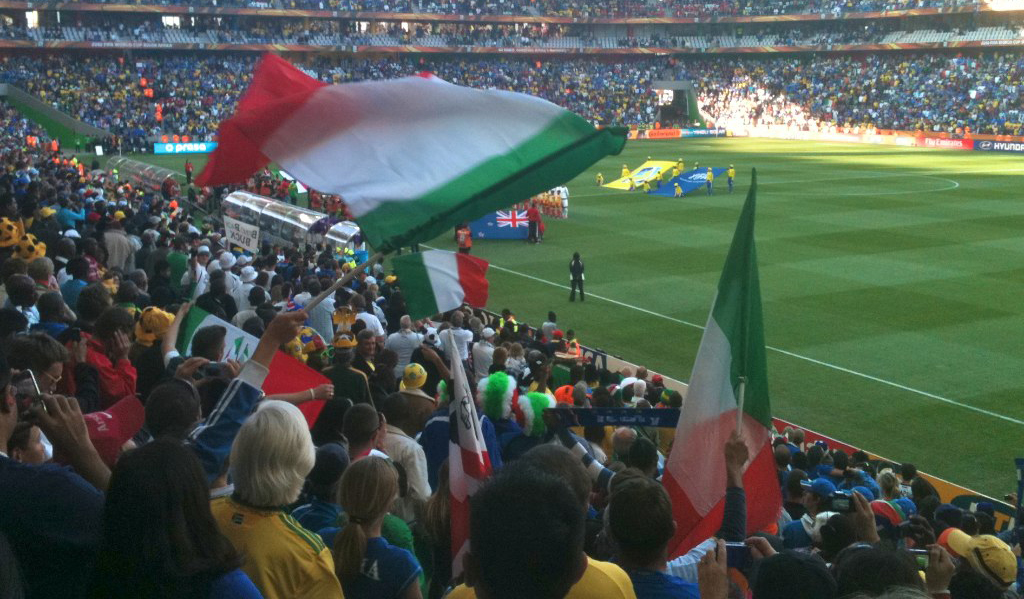
Italy's Serie A was the first European league to have multiple representatives win a world title.

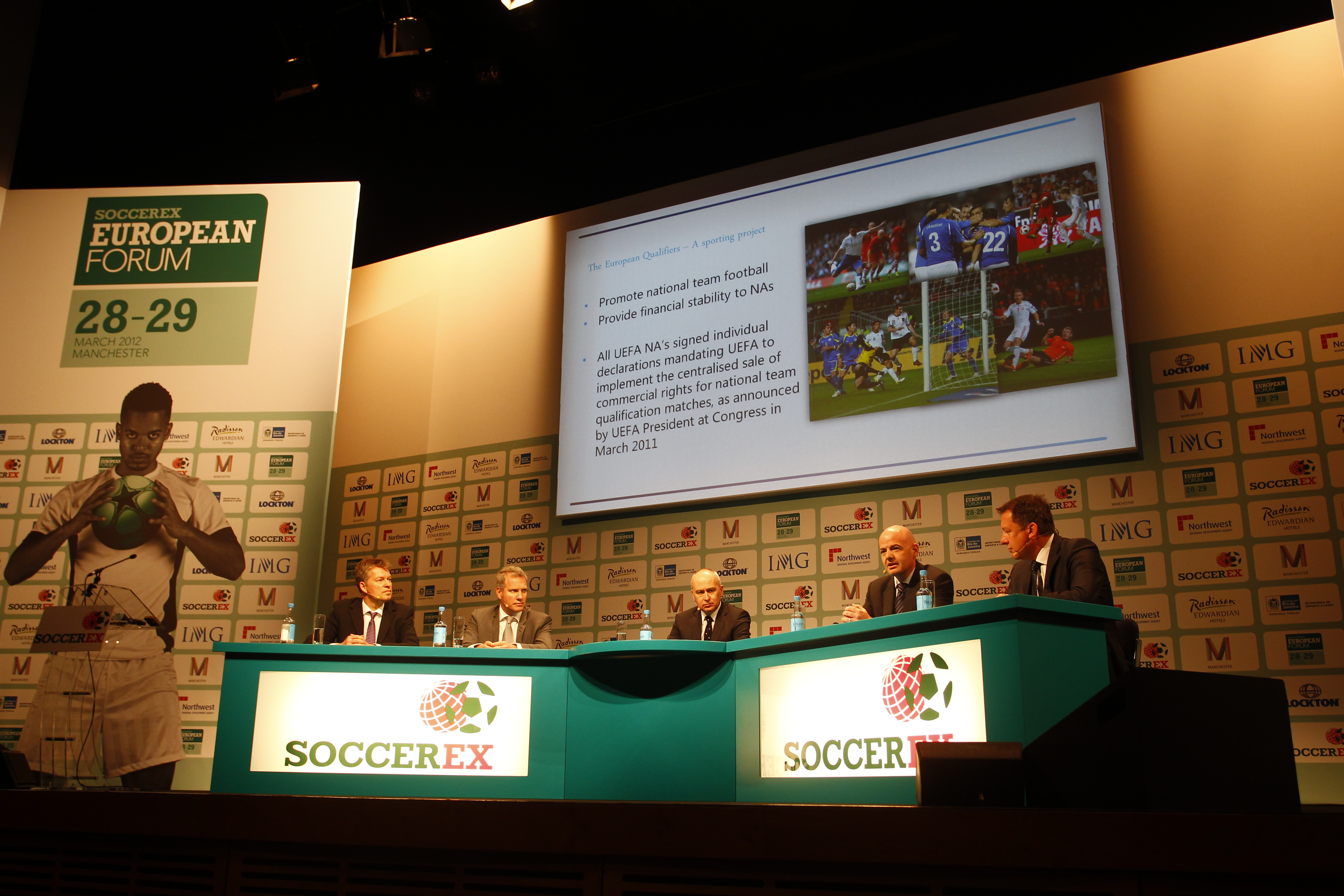
The Union des Associations Européennes de Football (or simply UEFA) is the most successful confederation of the competition, with seventeen titles.

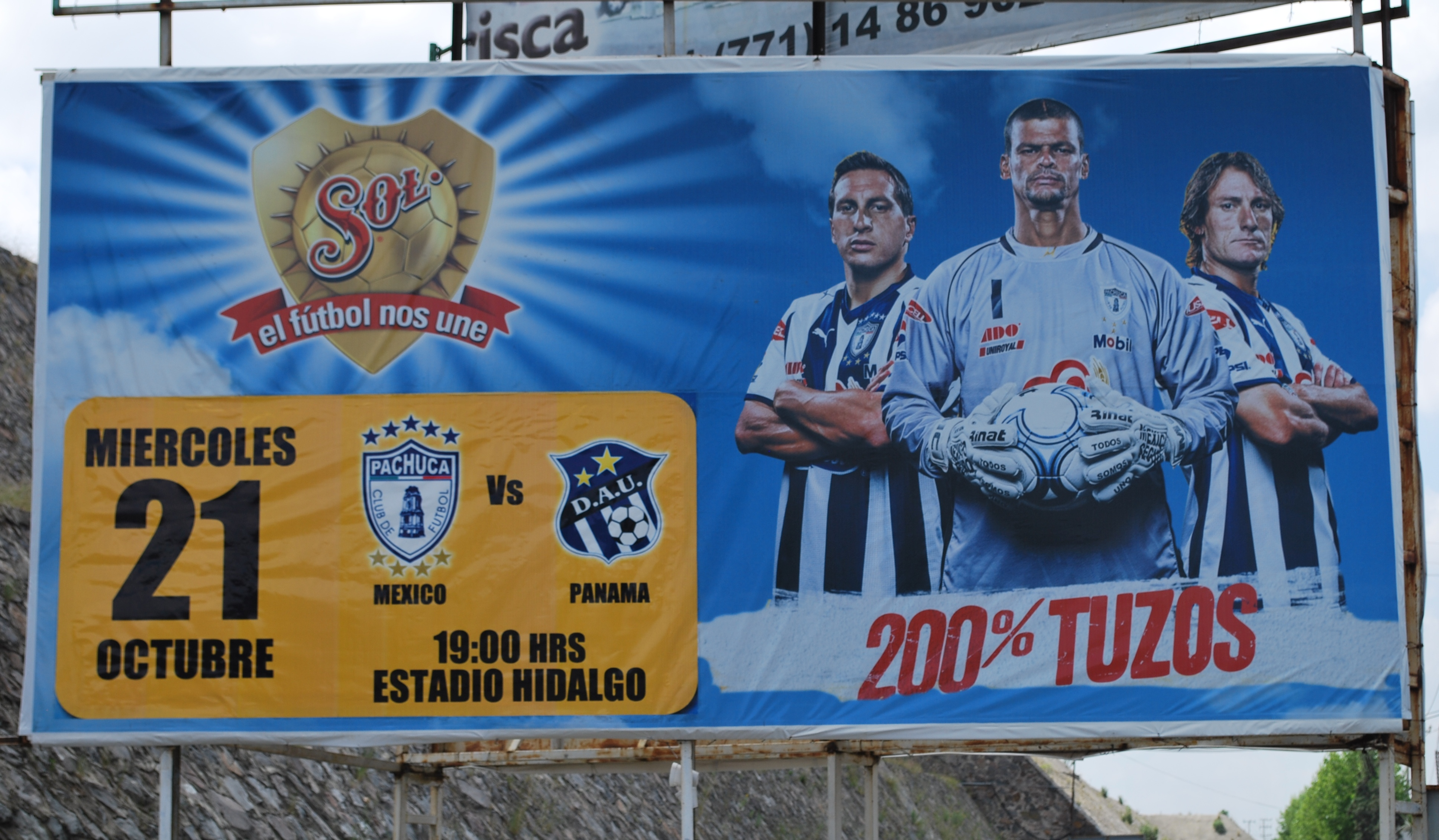
Pachuca is CONCACAF's second-most habitual participant in the FIFA Club World Cup behind Monterrey, with five appearances in 2007, 2008, 2010, 2017 and 2025.

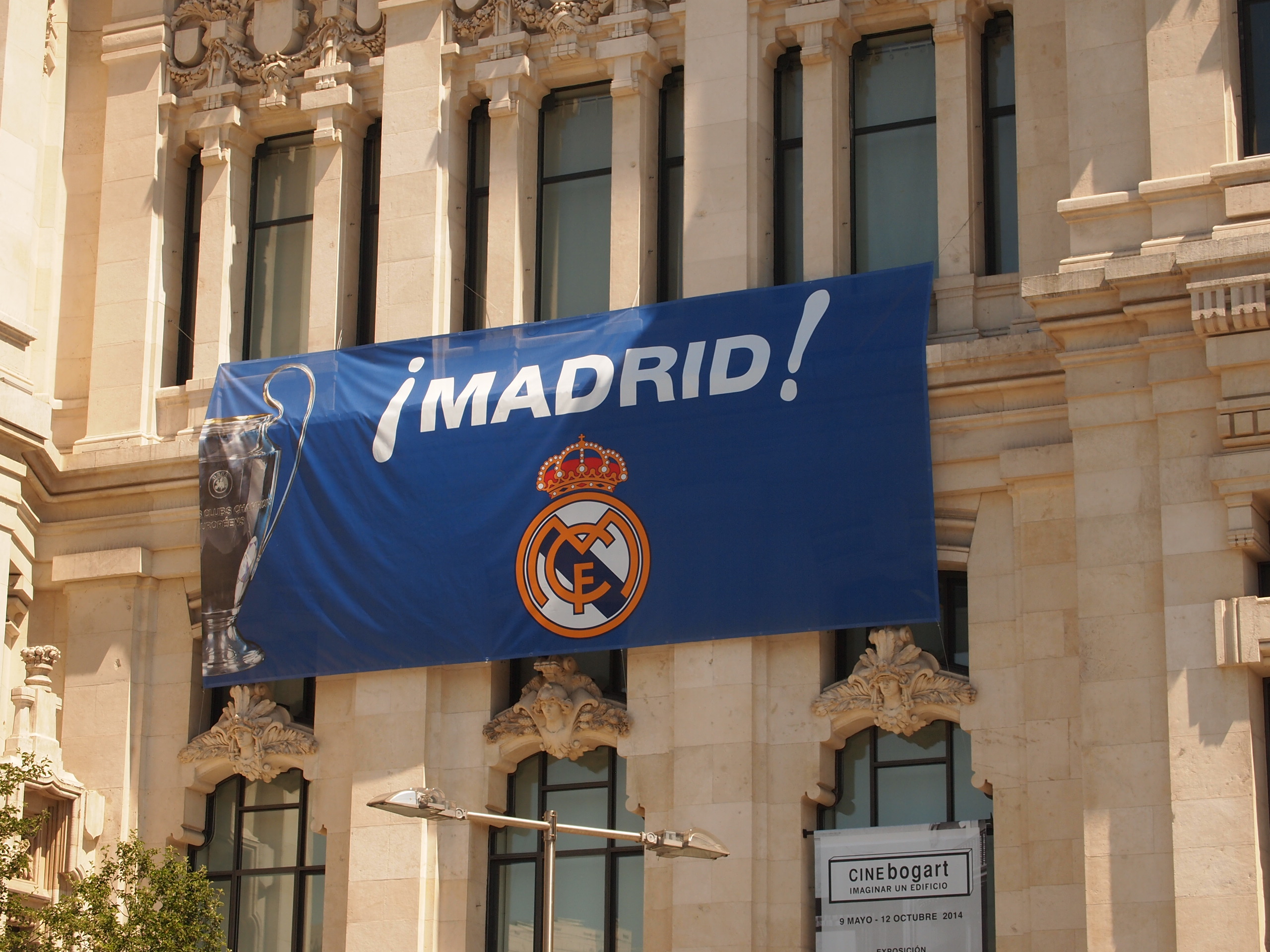
Real Madrid is the most successful team in the FIFA Club World Cup, with five titles won in 2014, 2016, 2017, 2018 and 2022.

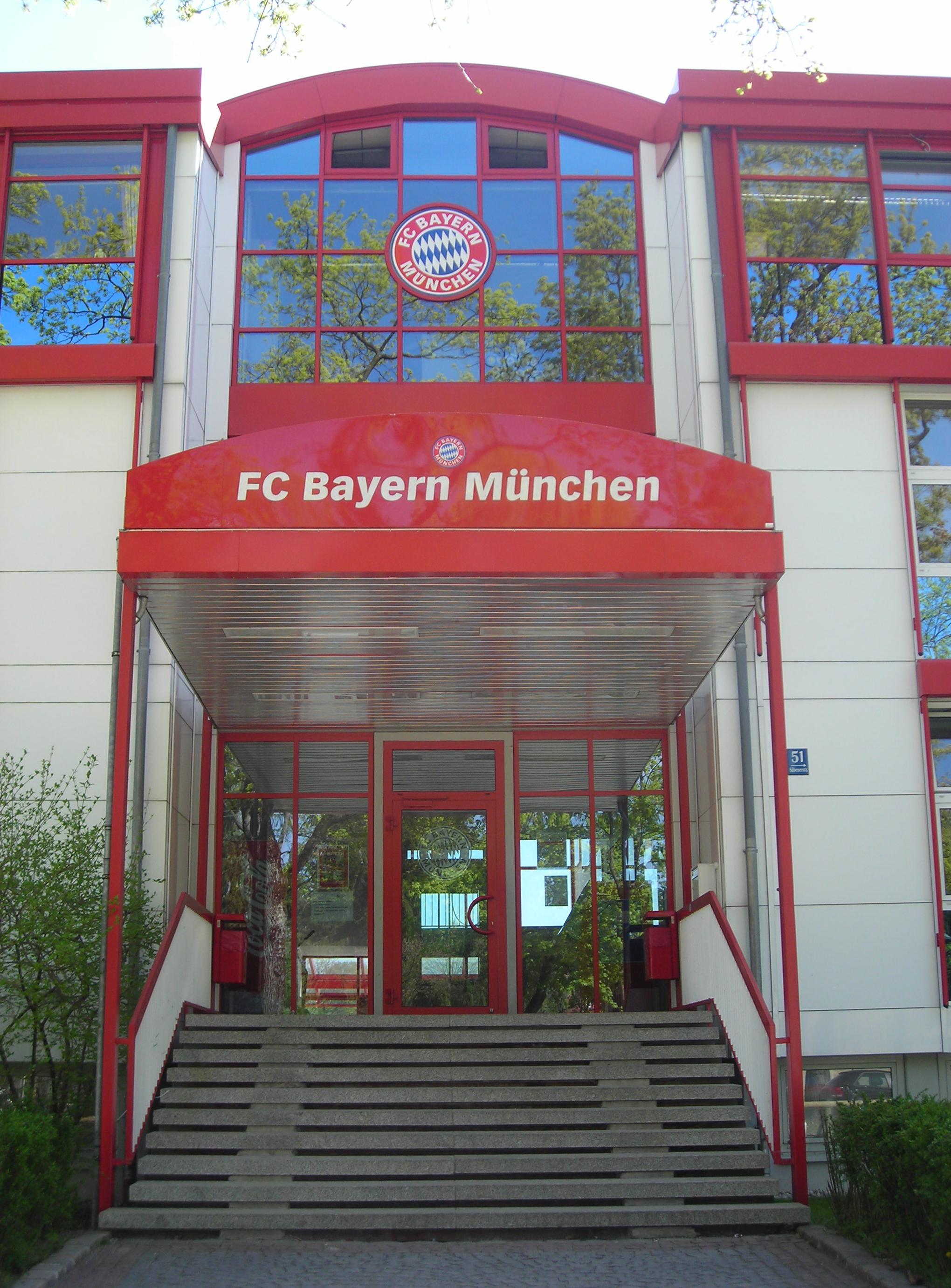
Bayern Munich is the only German club to win the tournament, doing so twice without conceding a goal.

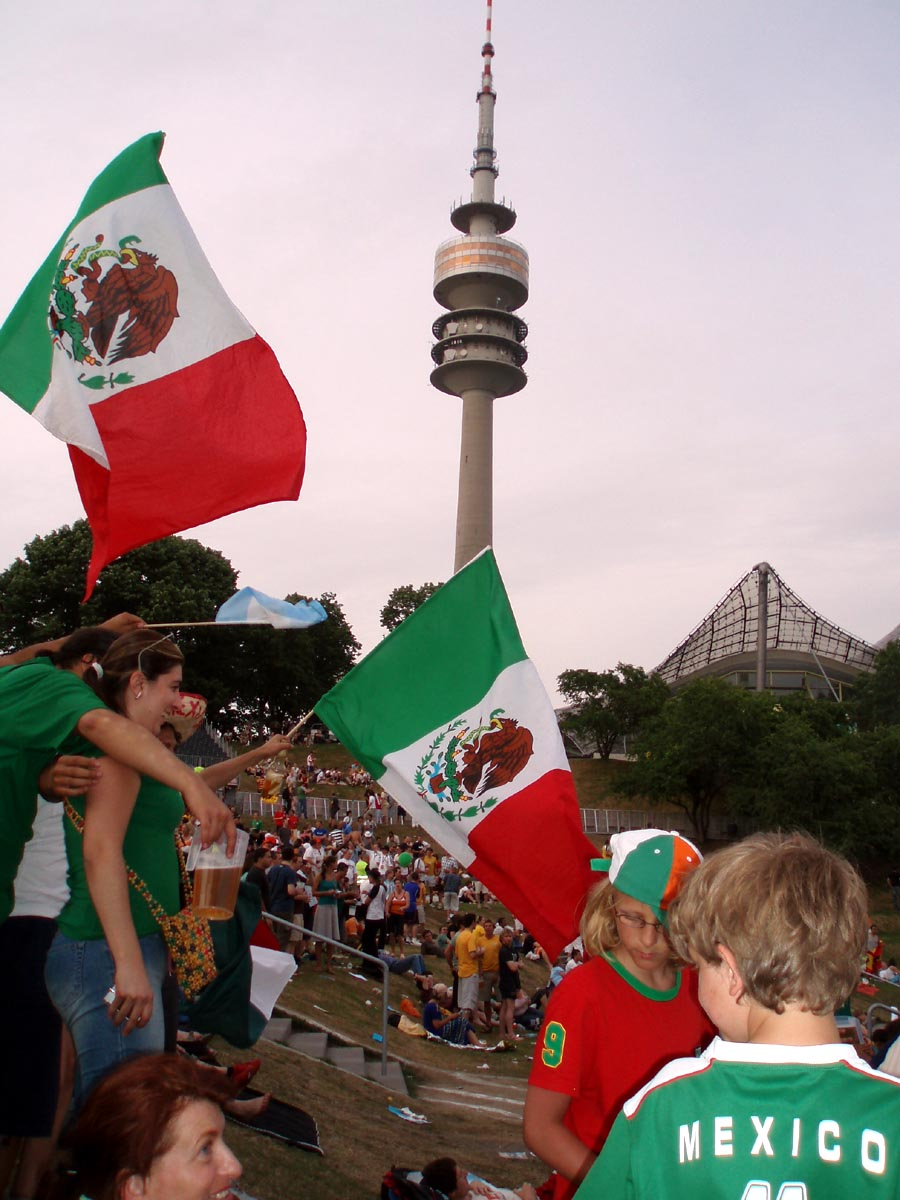
Mexico's Liga MX has had nine different participants at the FIFA Club World Cup, behind only Brazil's eleven as the most for one country.

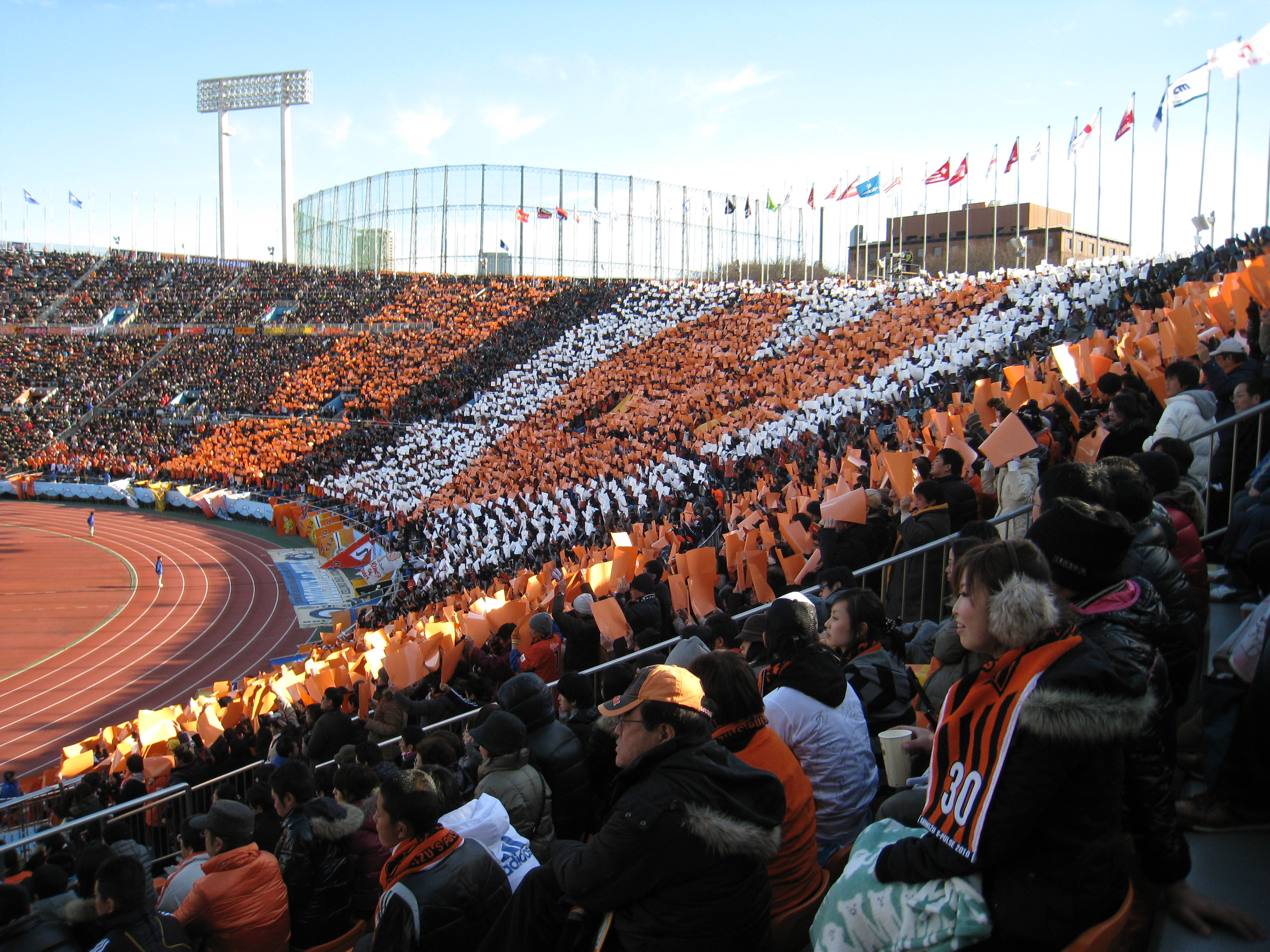
The J.League, Japan's premier club competition, has been Asia's joint best representative, being runners-up once.

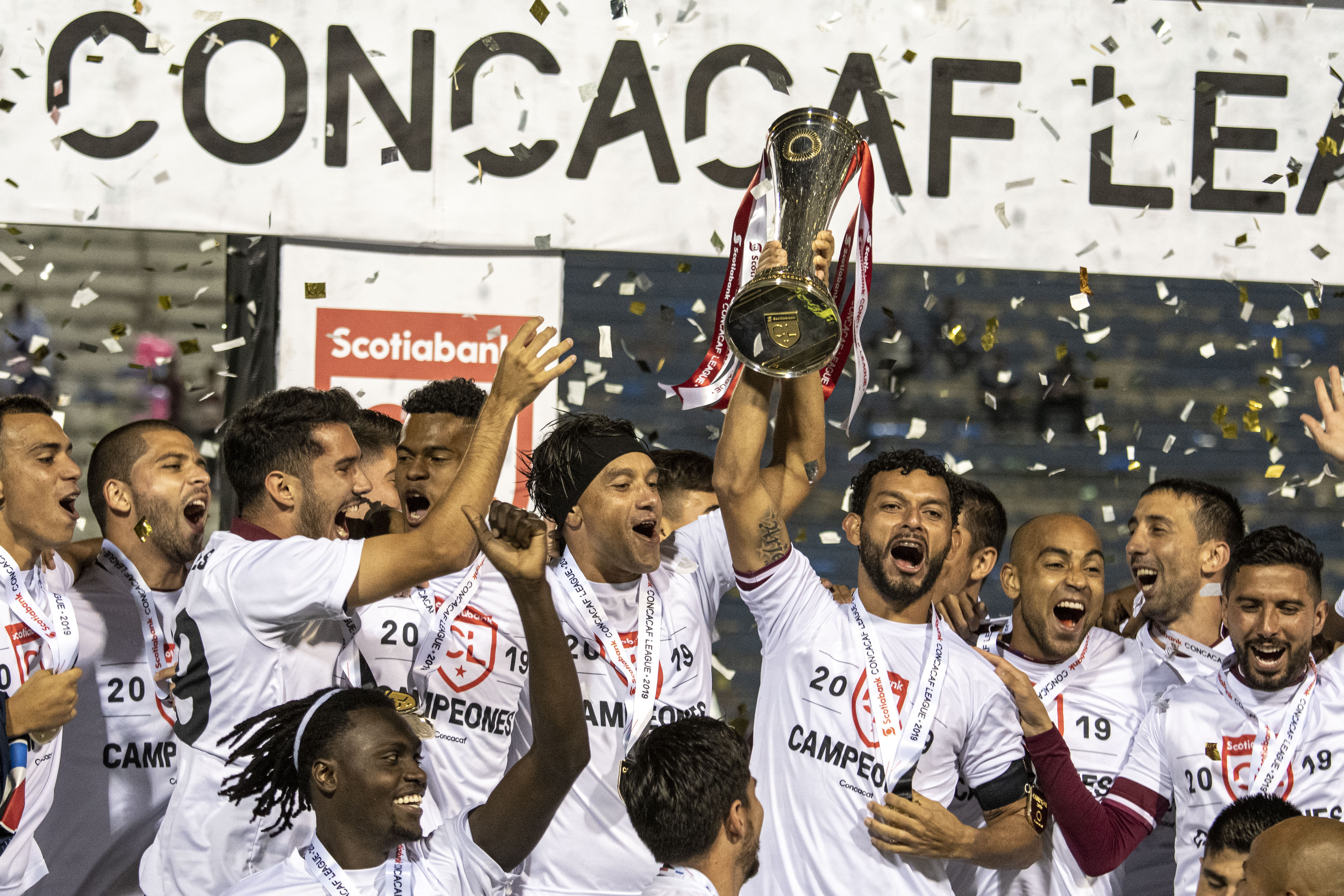
Deportivo Saprissa of Costa Rica is the only CONCACAF club from outside Mexico or the United States to enter the tournament, earning a bronze medal in 2005.

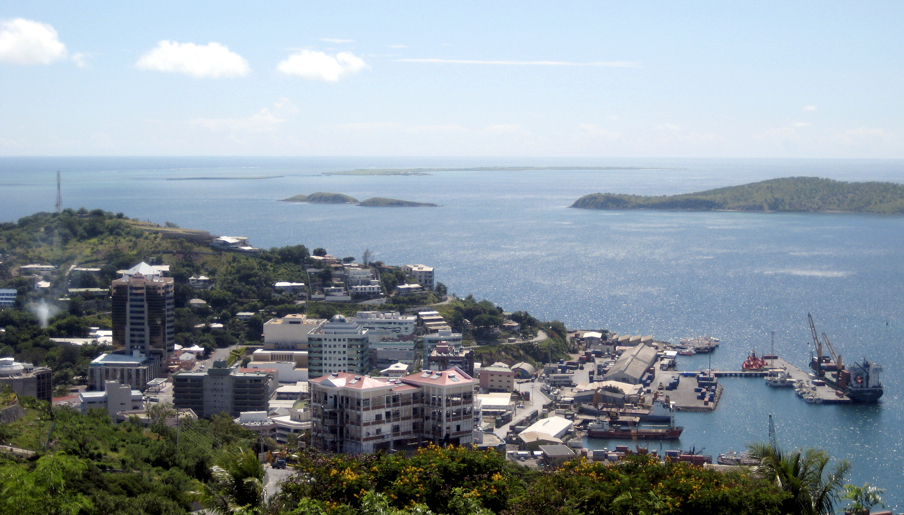
PRK Hekari United from Port Moresby, Papua New Guinea became the first club outside New Zealand or Australia to represent the OFC at the FIFA Club World Cup.

=== By club ===
Performance by club
Club	Titles	Runners-up	Third or Semi-finalist (since 2025)	Fourth	Ref(s)
(Spain) Real Madrid	5 (2014, 2016, 2017, 2018, 2022)	—	1 (2025)	1 (2000)	
(Spain) Barcelona	3 (2009, 2011, 2015)	1 (2006)	—	—	
(England) Chelsea	2 (2021, 2025)	1 (2012)	—	—	
(Brazil) Corinthians	2 (2000, 2012)	—	—	—	
(Germany) Bayern Munich	2 (2013, 2020)	—	—	—	
(England) Liverpool	1 (2019)	1 (2005)	—	—	
(Brazil) Internacional	1 (2006)	—	1 (2010)	—	
(Brazil) São Paulo	1 (2005)	—	—	—	
(Italy) Milan	1 (2007)	—	—	—	
(England) Manchester United	1 (2008)	—	—	—	
(Italy) Internazionale	1 (2010)	—	—	—	
(England) Manchester City	1 (2023)	—	—	—	
(Argentina) River Plate	—	1 (2015)	1 (2018)	—	
(Brazil) Flamengo	—	1 (2019)	1 (2022)	—	
(Brazil) Fluminense	—	1 (2023)	1 (2025)	—	
(Saudi Arabia) Al-Hilal	—	1 (2022)	—	2 (2019, 2021)	
(Japan) Kashima Antlers	—	1 (2016)	—	1 (2018)	
(Brazil) Palmeiras	—	1 (2021)	—	1 (2020)	
(Brazil) Vasco da Gama	—	1 (2000)	—	—	
(Argentina) Boca Juniors	—	1 (2007)	—	—	
(Ecuador) LDU Quito	—	1 (2008)	—	—	
(Argentina) Estudiantes	—	1 (2009)	—	—	
(Democratic Republic of the Congo) TP Mazembe	—	1 (2010)	—	—	
(Brazil) Santos	—	1 (2011)	—	—	
(Morocco) Raja Casablanca	—	1 (2013)	—	—	
(Argentina) San Lorenzo	—	1 (2014)	—	—	
(Brazil) Grêmio	—	1 (2017)	—	—	
(United Arab Emirates) Al-Ain	—	1 (2018)	—	—	
(Mexico) UANL	—	1 (2020)	—	—	
(France) Paris Saint-Germain	—	1 (2025)	—	—	
(Egypt) Al Ahly	—	—	4 (2006, 2020, 2021, 2023)	2 (2012, 2022)	
(Mexico) Monterrey	—	—	2 (2012, 2019)	—	
(Japan) Urawa Red Diamonds	—	—	1 (2007)	1 (2023)	
(Mexico) Pachuca	—	—	1 (2017)	1 (2008)	
(Mexico) Necaxa	—	—	1 (2000)	—	
(Costa Rica) Saprissa	—	—	1 (2005)	—	
(Japan) Gamba Osaka	—	—	1 (2008)	—	
(South Korea) Pohang Steelers	—	—	1 (2009)	—	
(Qatar) Al-Sadd	—	—	1 (2011)	—	
(Brazil) Atlético Mineiro	—	—	1 (2013)	—	
(New Zealand) Auckland City	—	—	1 (2014)	—	
(Japan) Sanfrecce Hiroshima	—	—	1 (2015)	—	
(Colombia) Atlético Nacional	—	—	1 (2016)	—	
(Mexico) América	—	—	—	2 (2006, 2016)	
(China) Guangzhou Evergrande	—	—	—	2 (2013, 2015)	
(Saudi Arabia) Al-Ittihad	—	—	—	1 (2005)	
(Tunisia) Étoile du Sahel	—	—	—	1 (2007)	
(Mexico) Atlante	—	—	—	1 (2009)	
(South Korea) Seongnam Ilhwa Chunma	—	—	—	1 (2010)	
(Japan) Kashiwa Reysol	—	—	—	1 (2011)	
(Mexico) Cruz Azul	—	—	—	1 (2014)	
(United Arab Emirates) Al-Jazira	—	—	—	1 (2017)	

=== By nation ===
Performance by nation
Nation	Titles	Runners-up	Third or Semi-finalist (since 2025)	Fourth	Ref(s)
Spain	8 (2009, 2011, 2014, 2015, 2016, 2017, 2018, 2022)	1 (2006)	1 (2025)	1 (2000)	
England	5 (2008, 2019, 2021, 2023, 2025)	2 (2005, 2012)	—	—	
Brazil	4 (2000, 2005, 2006, 2012)	6 (2000, 2011, 2017, 2019, 2021, 2023)	4 (2010, 2013, 2022, 2025)	1 (2020)	
Italy	2 (2007, 2010)	—	—	—	
Germany	2 (2013, 2020)	—	—	—	
Argentina	—	4 (2007, 2009, 2014, 2015)	1 (2018)	—	
Mexico	—	1 (2020)	4 (2000, 2012, 2017, 2019)	5 (2006, 2008, 2009, 2014, 2016)	
Japan	—	1 (2016)	3 (2007, 2008, 2015)	3 (2011, 2018, 2023)	
Saudi Arabia	—	1 (2022)	—	3 (2005, 2019, 2021)	
United Arab Emirates	—	1 (2018)	—	1 (2017)	
Ecuador	—	1 (2008)	—	—	
(Democratic Republic of the Congo) DR Congo	—	1 (2010)	—	—	
Morocco	—	1 (2013)	—	—	
France	—	1 (2025)	—	—	
Egypt	—	—	4 (2006, 2020, 2021, 2023)	2 (2012, 2022)	
South Korea	—	—	1 (2009)	1 (2010)	
Costa Rica	—	—	1 (2005)	—	
Qatar	—	—	1 (2011)	—	
New Zealand	—	—	1 (2014)	—	
Colombia	—	—	1 (2016)	—	
China	—	—	—	2 (2013, 2015)	
Tunisia	—	—	—	1 (2007)	

=== By confederation ===
Performance by confederation
Confederation	Titles	Runners-up	Third or Semi-finalist (since 2025)	Fourth	Note
UEFA	17 (2007, 2008, 2009, 2010, 2011, 2013, 2014, 2015, 2016, 2017, 2018, 2019, 2020, 2021, 2022, 2023, 2025)	4 (2005, 2006, 2012, 2025)	1 (2025)	1 (2000)	(Note: UEFA has seen Barcelona, Bayern Munich, Chelsea, Internazionale, Liverpool, Manchester City, Manchester United, Milan and Real Madrid win seventeen titles altogether. Barcelona, Chelsea, Liverpool and Paris Saint-Germain were each runners-up once. Real Madrid finished fourth in the inaugural competition, and reached the semi-finals on one further occasion.)
CONMEBOL	4 (2000, 2005, 2006, 2012)	11 (2000, 2007, 2008, 2009, 2011, 2014, 2015, 2017, 2019, 2021, 2023)	6 (2010, 2013, 2016, 2018, 2022, 2025)	1 (2020)	(Note: CONMEBOL has seen Corinthians, Internacional and São Paulo win four titles altogether. Boca Juniors, Estudiantes, Flamengo, Fluminense, Grêmio, LDU Quito, Palmeiras, River Plate, San Lorenzo, Santos and Vasco da Gama were each runners-up once (eleven occasions in total). Atlético Mineiro, Atlético Nacional, Flamengo, Internacional and River Plate each finished third once. Palmeiras finished fourth once. Fluminense finished as semi-finalists once.)
AFC	—	3 (2016, 2018, 2022)	5 (2007, 2008, 2009, 2011, 2015)	10 (2005, 2010, 2011, 2013, 2015, 2017, 2018, 2019, 2021, 2023)	(Note: AFC has seen Al-Ain, Al-Hilal and Kashima Antlers each finish as runners-up once. Al-Sadd, Gamba Osaka, Pohang Steelers, Sanfrecce Hiroshima and Urawa Red Diamonds each finished third once. Al-Hilal and Guangzhou Evergrande both finished in fourth place twice, while Al-Ittihad, Al-Jazira, Kashima Antlers, Kashiwa Reysol, Seongnam Ilhwa Chunma and Urawa Red Diamonds each finished fourth once.)
CAF	—	2 (2010, 2013)	4 (2006, 2020, 2021, 2023)	3 (2007, 2012, 2022)	(Note: CAF has seen both TP Mazembe and Raja Casablanca finish runners-up once. Al-Ahly finished in third place four times, and fourth place twice. Étoile du Sahel also finished fourth once.)
CONCACAF	—	1 (2020)	5 (2000, 2005, 2012, 2017, 2019)	5 (2006, 2008, 2009, 2014, 2016)	(Note: CONCACAF has seen UANL finish runners-up once, in 2020. Monterrey finished in third place twice, while Necaxa, Pachuca and Saprissa each finished third once. América finished in fourth place twice, while Atlante, Cruz Azul and Pachuca each finished fourth once.)
OFC	—	—	1 (2014)	—	(Note: OFC has seen Auckland City finish in third place once, in 2014.)

== Final statistics ==
Final success rate

Three clubs have appeared in the final of the FIFA Club World Cup more than once, with a 100% success rate:

- (Brazil) Corinthians (2000, 2012)
- (Spain) Real Madrid (2014, 2016, 2017, 2018, 2022)
- (Germany) Bayern Munich (2013, 2020)

Six clubs have appeared in the final once, being victorious on that occasion:

- (Brazil) São Paulo (2005)
- (Brazil) Internacional (2006)
- (Italy) Milan (2007)
- (England) Manchester United (2008)
- (Italy) Internazionale (2010)
- (England) Manchester City (2023)

One club has appeared in the final four times, losing only on one occasion:

- (Spain) Barcelona (lost in 2006, won in 2009, 2011, and 2015)

One club have appeared in the final three times, won two and lost once:

- (England) Chelsea (lost in 2012, won in 2021 and 2025)

One club have appeared in the final twice, won once and lost once:

- (England) Liverpool (lost in 2005, won in 2019)

Final failure rate

On the opposite end of the scale, eighteen clubs have played one final and lost:

- (Brazil) Vasco da Gama (2000)
- (Argentina) Boca Juniors (2007)
- (Ecuador) LDU Quito (2008)
- (Argentina) Estudiantes (2009)
- (Democratic Republic of the Congo) TP Mazembe (2010)
- (Brazil) Santos (2011)
- (Morocco) Raja Casablanca (2013)
- (Argentina) San Lorenzo (2014)
- (Argentina) River Plate (2015)
- (Japan) Kashima Antlers (2016)
- (Brazil) Grêmio (2017)
- (United Arab Emirates) Al-Ain (2018)
- (Brazil) Flamengo (2019)
- (Mexico) UANL (2020)
- (Brazil) Palmeiras (2021)
- (Saudi Arabia) Al-Hilal (2022)
- (Brazil) Fluminense (2023)
- (France) Paris Saint-Germain (2025)

All-time club final appearances

One club has participated in the FIFA Club World Cup final five times:

- (Spain) Real Madrid (2014, 2016, 2017, 2018, 2022)

== Appearances ==
=== List of participating clubs of the FIFA Club World Cup ===
The following is a list of clubs that have played in or qualified for the FIFA Club World Cup. Editions in bold indicate competitions won. Rows can be adjusted to national league, total number of participations by national league or club and years played. Auckland City have contested the FIFA Club World Cup twelve times, more than any other club.

List of participant clubs
Nation	No.	Clubs	Years
Brazil (11)	4	Flamengo	2019, 2022, 2025, 2029
Brazil (11)	3	Palmeiras	2020, 2021, 2025
Brazil (11)	2	Corinthians	**2000**, **2012**
Brazil (11)	2	Internacional	**2006**, 2010
Brazil (11)	2	Fluminense	2023, 2025
Brazil (11)	1	Vasco da Gama	2000
Brazil (11)	1	São Paulo	**2005**
Brazil (11)	1	Santos	2011
Brazil (11)	1	Atlético Mineiro	2013
Brazil (11)	1	Grêmio	2017
Brazil (11)	1	Botafogo	2025
Mexico (9)	6	Monterrey	2011, 2012, 2013, 2019, 2021, 2025
Mexico (9)	5	Pachuca	2007, 2008, 2010, 2017, 2025
Mexico (9)	3	América	2006, 2015, 2016
Mexico (9)	2	Cruz Azul	2014, 2029
Mexico (9)	1	Necaxa	2000
Mexico (9)	1	Atlante	2009
Mexico (9)	1	Guadalajara	2018
Mexico (9)	1	UANL	2020
Mexico (9)	1	León	2023
Japan (5)	4	Urawa Red Diamonds	2007, 2017, 2023, 2025
Japan (5)	2	Sanfrecce Hiroshima	2012, 2015
Japan (5)	2	Kashima Antlers	2016, 2018
Japan (5)	1	Gamba Osaka	2008
Japan (5)	1	Kashiwa Reysol	2011
England (4)
England (4)	3	Chelsea	2012, **2021**, **2025**
England (4)	2	Manchester United	2000, **2008**
England (4)	2	Liverpool	2005, **2019**
England (4)	2	Manchester City	**2023**, 2025
Saudi Arabia (4)	4	Al-Hilal	2019, 2021, 2022, 2025
Saudi Arabia (4)	2	Al-Ittihad	2005, 2023
Saudi Arabia (4)	1	Al-Nassr	2000
Saudi Arabia (4)	1	Al-Ahli	2029
South Korea (4)	3	Ulsan HD (Note: As Ulsan Hyundai in 2012 and 2020)	2012, 2020, 2025
South Korea (4)	2	Jeonbuk Hyundai Motors	2006, 2016
South Korea (4)	1	Pohang Steelers	2009
South Korea (4)	1	Seongnam FC (Note: As Seongnam Ilhwa Chunma in 2010)	2010
Argentina (4)	3	River Plate	2015, 2018, 2025
Argentina (4)	2	Boca Juniors	2007, 2025
Argentina (4)	1	Estudiantes	2009
Argentina (4)	1	San Lorenzo	2014
United Arab Emirates (4)	2	Al-Jazira	2017, 2021
United Arab Emirates (4)	2	Al-Ain	2018, 2025
United Arab Emirates (4)	1	Shabab Al-Ahli (Note: As Al-Ahli in 2009)	2009
United Arab Emirates (4)	1	Al-Wahda	2010
Australia (4)	1	South Melbourne	2000
Australia (4)	1	Sydney FC	2005
Australia (4)	1	Adelaide United	2008
Australia (4)	1	Western Sydney Wanderers	2014
New Zealand (3)	12	Auckland City	2006, 2009, 2011, 2012, 2013, 2014, 2015, 2016, 2017, 2022, 2023, 2025
New Zealand (3)	2	Waitakere United	2007, 2008
New Zealand (3)	1	Team Wellington	2018
Spain (3)	7	Real Madrid	2000, **2014**, **2016**, **2017**, **2018**, **2022**, 2025
Spain (3)	4	Barcelona	2006, **2009**, **2011**, **2015**
Spain (3)	1	Atlético Madrid	2025
Morocco (3)	3	Wydad Casablanca	2017, 2022, 2025
Morocco (3)	2	Raja Casablanca	2000, 2013
Morocco (3)	1	Moghreb Tétouan	2014
Italy (3)	2	Internazionale	**2010**, 2025
Italy (3)	1	Milan	**2007**
Italy (3)	1	Juventus	2025
United States (3)	2	Seattle Sounders FC	2022, 2025
United States (3)	1	Inter Miami CF	2025
United States (3)	1	Los Angeles FC	2025
Egypt (2)	10	Al Ahly	2005, 2006, 2008, 2012, 2013, 2020, 2021, 2022, 2023, 2025
Egypt (2)	1	Pyramids	2029
Tunisia (2)	4	Espérance de Tunis	2011, 2018, 2019, 2025
Tunisia (2)	1	Étoile du Sahel	2007
Germany (2)	3	Bayern Munich	**2013**, **2020**, 2025
Germany (2)	1	Borussia Dortmund	2025
Qatar (2)	2	Al-Sadd	2011, 2019
Qatar (2)	1	Al-Duhail	2020
Portugal (2)	1	Benfica	2025
Portugal (2)	1	Porto	2025
(Democratic Republic of the Congo) DR Congo (1)	3	TP Mazembe	2009, 2010, 2015
South Africa (1)	3	Mamelodi Sundowns	2016, 2025, 2029
China (1)	2	Guangzhou (Note: As Guangzhou Evergrande in 2013 and 2015)	2013, 2015
France (1)	2	Paris Saint-Germain	2025, 2029
Costa Rica (1)	1	Saprissa	2005
Iran (1)	1	Sepahan	2007
Ecuador (1)	1	LDU Quito	2008
Papua New Guinea (1)	1	Hekari United	2010
Algeria (1)	1	ES Sétif	2014
Colombia (1)	1	Atlético Nacional	2016
New Caledonia (1)	1	Hienghène Sport	2019
(French Polynesia) Tahiti (1)	1	AS Pirae	2021
Austria (1)	1	Red Bull Salzburg	2025

Most appearances by a club

- Auckland City have the record number of participations in the FIFA Club World Cup, taking part in twelve tournaments: 2006, 2009, 2011, 2012, 2013, 2014, 2015, 2016, 2017, 2022, 2023 and 2025. They were also supposed to participate in the 2020 and 2021 tournaments, but had to withdraw from both because of quarantine due to the COVID-19 pandemic.

Most consecutive appearances by a club

- Auckland City participated in the FIFA Club World Cup seven consecutive seasons: 2011, 2012, 2013, 2014, 2015, 2016 and 2017.

Most games played by a club

Al Ahly holds the record for number of matches played in the FIFA Club World Cup, taking part in 28 matches.

== All-time top 10 FIFA Club World Cup table ==
The following is a list of the top ten clubs with the most points gained in the FIFA Club World Cup. The clubs are primarily ranked by their points gained, on a basis of three points for a win, one for a draw and no points for a loss.

As of 2025 FIFA Club World Cup

Historical table of the FIFA Club World Cup
Rank	Nat.	Club	Titles	Apps	Pts	Pld	W	D	L	GF	GA	GD	PPG
1	(Spain)	Real Madrid	5	7	51	20	16	3	1	57	20	+37	2.55
2	(Egypt)	Al Ahly	0	10	33	28	10	3	15	35	45	−10	1.17
3	(England)	Chelsea	2	3	27	11	9	0	2	23	8	+15	2.45
4	(Mexico)	Monterrey	0	6	25	16	7	4	5	31	21	+10	1.56
5	(Spain)	Barcelona	3	4	21	8	7	0	1	23	3	+20	2.62
6	(Germany)	Bayern Munich	2	3	21	9	7	0	2	24	6	+18	2.33
7	(Saudi Arabia)	Al-Hilal	0	4	19	14	5	4	5	25	25	0	1.35
8	(England)	Manchester City	1	2	15	6	5	0	1	23	6	+17	2.50
9	(France)	Paris Saint-Germain	0	1	15	7	5	0	2	16	4	+12	2.14
10	(Japan)	Sanfrecce Hiroshima	0	2	15	7	5	0	2	12	6	+6	2.14

== Players ==
=== Most appearances ===
Players in bold text are still active as of the 2025 FIFA Club World Cup.

All-time top player appearances
Rank	Player	Nation	Matches	Tournaments	Club(s) (Apps)
1	**Hussein El Shahat**	Egypt	18	6 (2018, 2020–2023, 2025)	Al Ain (4), Al Ahly (14)
2	**Mohamed Hany**	Egypt	16	5 (2020–2023, 2025)	Al Ahly
3	**Luka Modrić**	Croatia	14	5 (2016–2018, 2022, 2025)	Real Madrid
3	**Taher Mohamed**	Egypt	14	5 (2020–2023, 2025)	Al Ahly
5	**Mohamed El Shenawy**	Egypt	13	4 (2020, 2022–2023, 2025)	Al Ahly

=== Most championships ===
- (Germany) Toni Kroos – 6 (Bayern Munich, 2013; Real Madrid, 2014, 2016–18, 2022).

=== Most appearances in a Club World Cup final ===
- (Germany) Toni Kroos – 6 (he appeared in 2013 as a member of Bayern Munich, and in 2014, 2016, 2017, 2018 and 2022 as a member of Real Madrid, winning all of them).

=== Most tournaments by a player ===
- Emiliano Tade has the record number of participations in the FIFA Club World Cup, taking part in nine tournaments: 2011, 2012, 2013, 2014, 2015, 2016, 2017, 2022 and 2023. He also holds the record for the most consecutive participations with seven between 2011 and 2017.

=== Youngest player ===
- Víctor Mañón – 16 years, 319 days (for Pachuca vs. Gamba Osaka, 21 December 2008)

=== Oldest player ===
- Óscar Pérez – 44 years, 314 days (for Pachuca vs. Grêmio, 12 December 2017)

== Goalscoring ==
=== Overall top goalscorers ===
- Tournaments in round brackets, e.g., (2013): Played in the tournament, but did not score a goal.
- Tournaments in square brackets: e.g., [2014]: Part of the squad for the tournament, but did not play.
- Updated as of the 2025 FIFA Club World Cup.

Players with at least 4 goals at FIFA Club World Cup tournaments
Rank	Player	Team(s)	Goals scored	Matches played	Goal average	Tournament(s)
1	(Portugal) Cristiano Ronaldo	(England) Manchester United (Spain) Real Madrid	7	8	0.88	2008, (2014), 2016, 2017
2	(Wales) Gareth Bale	(Spain) Real Madrid	6	6	1.00	2014, 2017, 2018
2	(Uruguay) Luis Suárez	(Spain) Barcelona (United States) Inter Miami CF	6	6	1.00	2015, 2025
2	(Argentina) Lionel Messi	(Spain) Barcelona (United States) Inter Miami CF	6	9	0.67	2009, 2011, 2015, 2025
2	(France) Karim Benzema	(Spain) Real Madrid (Saudi Arabia) Al-Ittihad	6	11	0.55	2014, 2016, (2017), (2018), 2022, 2023
6	(Argentina) César Delgado	(Mexico) Monterrey	5	6	0.83	(2011), 2012, 2013
6	(Uruguay) Federico Valverde	(Spain) Real Madrid	5	8	0.63	(2018), 2022, 2025
6	(Saudi Arabia) Salem Al-Dawsari	(Saudi Arabia) Al-Hilal	5	12	0.42	2019, 2021, 2022, 2025
9	(Brazil) Denilson	(South Korea) Pohang Steelers	4	3	1.33	2009
9	(Argentina) Ángel Di María	(Portugal) Benfica	4	4	1.00	2025
9	(Guinea) Serhou Guirassy	(Germany) Borussia Dortmund	4	5	0.80	2025
9	(Brazil) Marcos Leonardo	(Saudi Arabia) Al-Hilal	4	5	0.80	2025
9	(Brazil) Pedro	(Brazil) Flamengo	4	5	0.80	2022, (2025)
9	(Spain) Gonzalo García	(Spain) Real Madrid	4	6	0.67	2025
9	(England) Phil Foden	(England) Manchester City	4	6	0.67	2023, 2025
9	(Brazil) Vinícius Júnior	(Spain) Real Madrid	4	9	0.44	(2018), 2022, 2025
9	(Japan) Tsukasa Shiotani	(Japan) Sanfrecce Hiroshima (United Arab Emirates) Al-Ain	4	9	0.44	(2012), 2015, 2018
9	(Spain) Sergio Ramos	(Spain) Real Madrid (Mexico) Monterrey	4	10	0.40	2014, (2016), (2017), 2018, 2025
9	(Egypt) Mohamed Aboutrika	(Egypt) Al Ahly	4	11	0.36	(2005), 2006, (2008), 2012, (2013)
9	(Egypt) Hussein El Shahat	(United Arab Emirates) Al-Ain (Egypt) Al Ahly	4	13	0.31	2018, 2020, (2021), 2022, 2023

=== Top scorers by tournament ===
Year	Player(s)	Goals scored	Matches played
2000	(France) Nicolas Anelka	3	3
2000	(Brazil) Romário	3	4
2005	(Brazil) Amoroso	2	2
2005	(England) Peter Crouch	2	2
2005	(Saudi Arabia) Mohammed Noor	2	3
2005	(Costa Rica) Álvaro Saborío	2	3
2006	(Egypt) Mohamed Aboutrika	3	3
2007	(Brazil) Washington	3	3
2008	(England) Wayne Rooney	3	2
2009	(Brazil) Denilson	4	3
2010	(Colombia) Mauricio Molina	3	3
2011	(Brazil) Adriano	2	1
2011	(Argentina) Lionel Messi	2	2
2012	(Argentina) César Delgado	3	3
2012	(Japan) Hisato Satō	3	3
2013	(Argentina) César Delgado	2	2
2013	(Brazil) Ronaldinho	2	2
2013	(Argentina) Darío Conca	2	3
2013	(Morocco) Mouhcine Iajour	2	4
2014	(Wales) Gareth Bale	2	2
2014	(Spain) Sergio Ramos	2	2
2014	(Mexico) Gerardo Torrado	2	3
2015	(Uruguay) Luis Suárez	5	2
2016	(Portugal) Cristiano Ronaldo	4	2
2017	(Brazil) Maurício Antônio	2	1
2017	(Portugal) Cristiano Ronaldo	2	2
2017	(Brazil) Romarinho	2	4
2018	(Wales) Gareth Bale	3	2
2018	(Colombia) Rafael Santos Borré	3	2
2019	(Libya) Hamdou Elhouni	3	2
2019	(Algeria) Baghdad Bounedjah	3	3
2020	(France) André-Pierre Gignac	3	3
2021	(Belgium) Romelu Lukaku	2	2
2021	(Brazil) Raphael Veiga	2	2
2021	(Mali) Abdoulay Diaby	2	3
2021	(Egypt) Yasser Ibrahim	2	3
2022	(Brazil) Pedro	4	2
2023	(Argentina) Julián Alvarez	2	2
2023	(France) Karim Benzema	2	2
2023	(Tunisia) Ali Maâloul	2	3
2025	(Argentina) Ángel Di María	4	4
2025	(Guinea) Serhou Guirassy	4	5
2025	(Brazil) Marcos Leonardo	4	5
2025	(Spain) Gonzalo García	4	6

=== Goalscoring records ===
- Cristiano Ronaldo and Lionel Messi share the record for most goals scored in the finals of the competition. Ronaldo has scored four goals in four finals and Messi has scored four goals in three finals.
- Lionel Messi is the only player to have scored in three different final matches: 2009, 2011 and 2015.
- Luis Suárez holds the record for most goals in a single tournament, scoring a record five goals in the 2015 edition.
- Cristiano Ronaldo is the only player to score a hat-trick in the final of the competition, doing so in the 2016 final against Kashima Antlers.
- Luis Suárez, Cristiano Ronaldo, Gareth Bale, Hamdou Elhouni, Jamal Musiala and Wessam Abou Ali are the only players to have scored a hat-trick in the competition's history.
- Rogério Ceni is the only goalkeeper to have scored a goal in the competition, doing so in the 2005 semi-finals.
- Cristiano Ronaldo is the only player to score goals for two different champions, doing so in 2008 for Manchester United and in 2016 and 2017 for Real Madrid.

== Coaching ==
=== Most appearances ===
- Pep Guardiola has the record for most appearances as a manager with 12, overseeing two matches in 2009, 2011, 2013, and 2023, and four matches in 2025, winning 11 of them.

=== Most tournaments appearances ===
- Ramon Tribulietx has the record number of years as manager, taking part in 2011, 2012, 2013, 2014, 2015, 2016 and 2017.

=== Most tournaments won ===
- Pep Guardiola has won a record number four FIFA Club World Cups (2009, 2011, 2013 and 2023)

== Notes ==
Footnotes
