= 2011 FIFA Club World Cup final =

- Match programme cover
- Event: 2011 FIFA Club World Cup
Santos	Barcelona
(Brazil)	(Spain)
0	4
- Date: 18 December 2011
- Venue: International Stadium Yokohama, Yokohama
- Referee: Ravshan Irmatov (Uzbekistan)
- Attendance: 68,166
- Weather: Clear night 9 °C (48 °F); 42% humidity

The 2011 FIFA Club World Cup final was the final match of the 2011 FIFA Club World Cup, an association football tournament hosted by Japan. It was the eighth final of the FIFA Club World Cup, a FIFA-organized tournament between the winners of the six continental confederations as well as the host nation's league champions.

The final was played between CONMEBOL's champion Santos and UEFA's champion Barcelona. Barcelona defeated Santos 4–0 and won their second FIFA Club World Cup, two years after they won their first one in 2009.

The match was billed as a showdown between Barcelona forward Lionel Messi and the 19-year-old Santos forward Neymar, who would later go on to become Messi's teammate at both Barcelona and Paris Saint-Germain. Messi won the "duel" by scoring two goals in the final and being named man of the match as well as player of the tournament.

== Road to final ==
(Brazil) Santos	Team	(Spain) Barcelona
CONMEBOL	Confederation	UEFA
Winner of the 2011 Copa Libertadores	Qualification	Winner of the 2010–11 UEFA Champions League
–	Play-off round	–
–	Quarter-finals	–
3–1 (Japan) Kashiwa Reysol (Neymar 19', Borges 24', Danilo 63')	Semi-finals	4–0 (Qatar) Al-Sadd (Adriano 25', 43', Keita 64', Maxwell 81')

== Team news ==
Barcelona forward David Villa missed the final after he broke his shinbone in the semi-final victory over Al-Sadd. He was injured six minutes before half-time after appearing to land awkwardly; Barcelona announced after the match that he had suffered a "fracture to the tibia in his left leg" that could see him sidelined for four to five months.

== Match ==
=== Summary ===
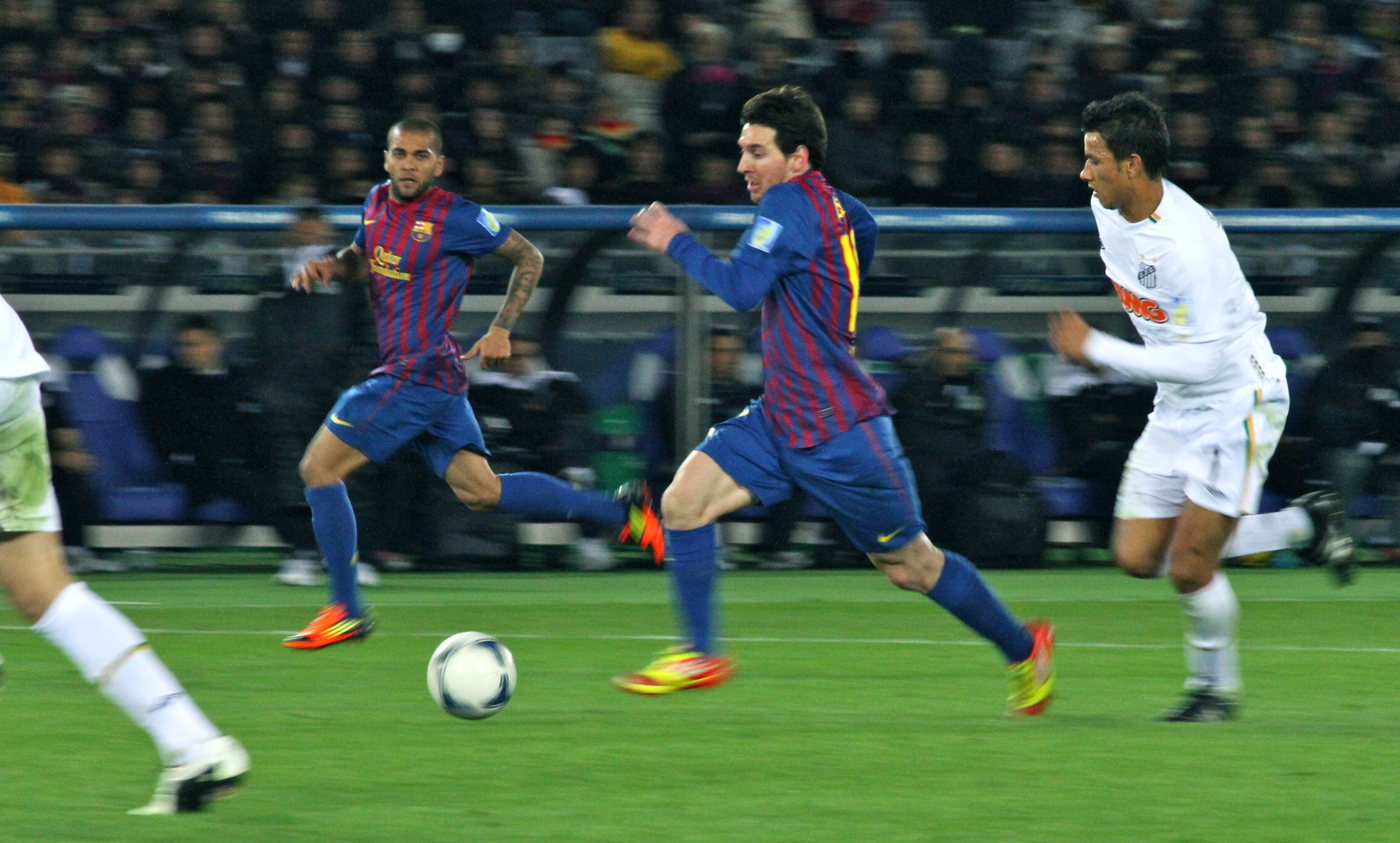
Barcelona forward Lionel Messi in action during the second half

In the first half, Barcelona were extremely dominant. Messi and Thiago forced saves from Santos goalkeeper Rafael Cabral in the 12th minute. Messi then scored with a chip over Cabral in the 17th minute. Seven minutes later, Xavi scored a second with a strike from just inside the penalty area. Santos came back with a short-range effort by Borges that was saved by Barcelona 'keeper Víctor Valdés, before Cesc Fàbregas hit the post two minutes later and then scored Barcelona's third goal just before the half ended.

In the second half, Santos improved and teenage star Neymar finally had a chance for Santos in the 57th minute when he was one-on-one with Valdés, but the shot was saved. Barcelona's Dani Alves hit the post in the 79th minute before Messi rounded Rafael in the 82nd minute to cap the scoring with his second goal.

=== Details ===
18 December 2011
19:30 JST

Santos (Brazil)	0–4	(Spain) Barcelona
	Report	Messi 17', 82'; Xavi 24'; Fàbregas 45'

International Stadium Yokohama, Yokohama
Attendance: 68,166
Referee: Ravshan Irmatov (Uzbekistan)

Santos	Barcelona

GK	1	(Brazil) Rafael Cabral
RWB	4	(Brazil) Danilo		(substituted off) 31'
RCB	14	(Brazil) Bruno Rodrigo
CB	2	(Brazil) Edu Dracena (c)	(yellow card) 74'
LCB	6	(Brazil) Durval
LWB	3	(Brazil) Léo
CM	7	(Brazil) Henrique
CM	5	(Brazil) Arouca
AM	10	(Brazil) Ganso	(yellow card) 73'	(substituted off) 83'
LW	11	(Brazil) Neymar
ST	9	(Brazil) Borges		(substituted off) 79'
Substitutions:
MF	8	(Brazil) Elano		(substituted on) 31'
FW	19	(Brazil) Alan Kardec		(substituted on) 79'
MF	18	(Brazil) Ibson		(substituted on) 83'
Manager:
(Brazil) Muricy Ramalho

GK	1	(Spain) Víctor Valdés
RB	2	(Brazil) Dani Alves
CB	5	(Spain) Carles Puyol (c)		(substituted off) 85'
CB	3	(Spain) Gerard Piqué	(yellow card) 39'	(substituted off) 56'
LB	22	(France) Eric Abidal
DM	16	(Spain) Sergio Busquets
RM	6	(Spain) Xavi
CM	11	(Spain) Thiago		(substituted off) 79'
CM	4	(Spain) Cesc Fàbregas
LM	8	(Spain) Andrés Iniesta
CF	10	(Argentina) Lionel Messi
Substitutions:
MF	14	(Argentina) Javier Mascherano	(yellow card) 71'	(substituted on) 56'
FW	17	(Spain) Pedro		(substituted on) 79'
DF	24	(Spain) Andreu Fontàs		(substituted on) 85'
Manager:
(Spain) Pep Guardiola

Assistant referees:
Abdukhamidullo Rasulov (Uzbekistan)
Bakhadyr Kochkarov (Kyrgyzstan)
Fourth official:
Yuichi Nishimura (Japan)
Fifth official:
Toru Sagara (Japan)

Match rules

- 90 minutes
- 30 minutes of extra time if necessary
- Penalty shoot-out if scores still level
- Twelve named substitutes
- Maximum of three substitutions

=== Statistics ===
Overall
	Santos	Barcelona
Goals scored	0	4
Total shots	8	16
Shots on target	3	9
Ball possession	29%	71%
Corner kicks	2	4
Fouls committed	13	13
Offsides	0	6
Yellow cards	2	2
Red cards	0	0

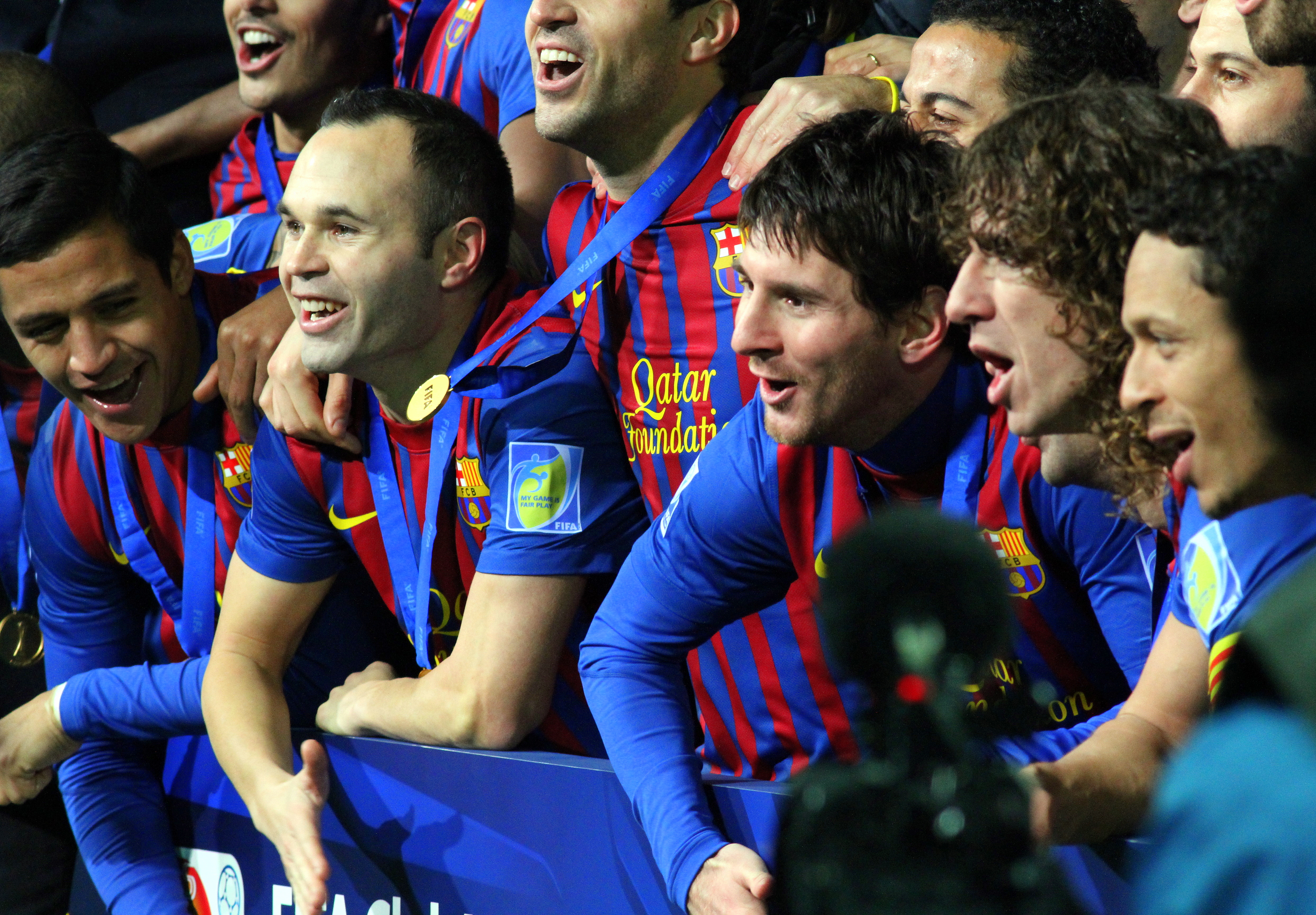
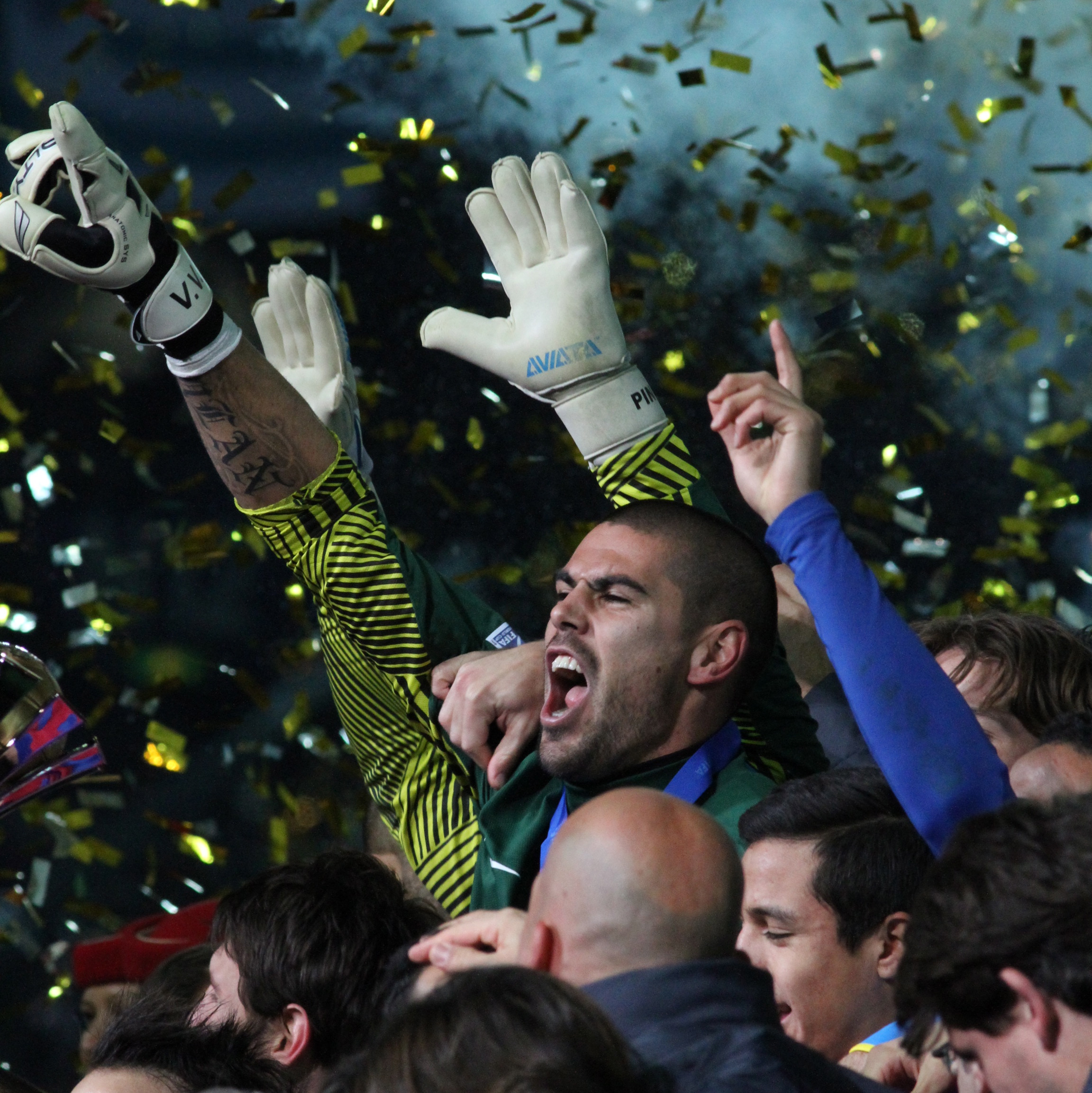
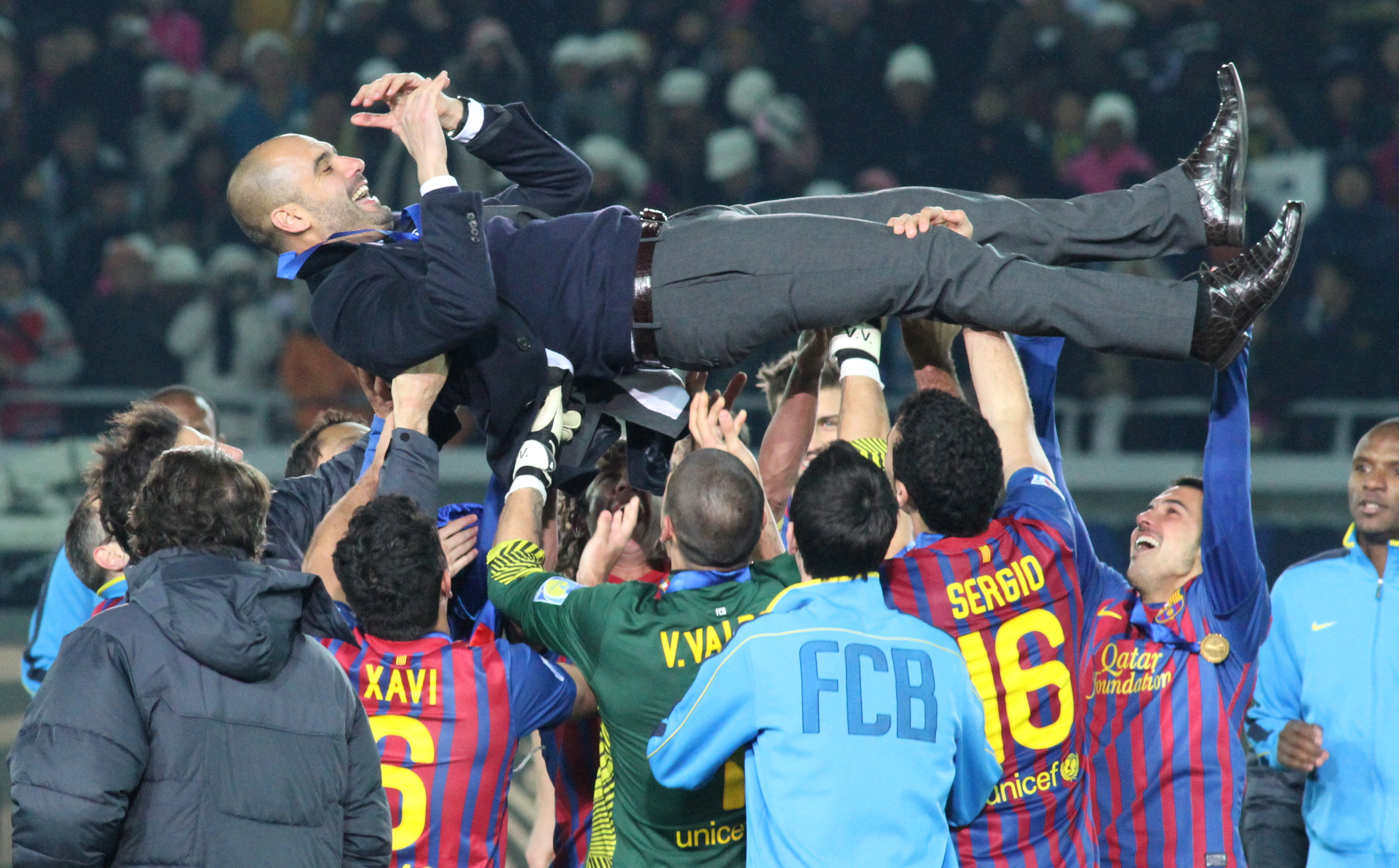
Barcelona players and coaching staff celebrating their win

== See also ==
- FC Barcelona in international football competitions
- Santos FC in South America
