= List of FIFA Club World Cup hat-tricks =

Since the inception of the FIFA Club World Cup in 2000, six players from six countries have scored three goals (a hat-trick) in a single match on six occasions for five clubs from four leagues. The first player to achieve the feat was Luis Suárez, who scored three times for Barcelona in a 3–0 victory over Guangzhou Evergrande on 17 December 2015. Cristiano Ronaldo is the only player to score a hat-trick in the final of the competition, doing so in the 2016 final against Kashima Antlers.

== List of hat-tricks ==
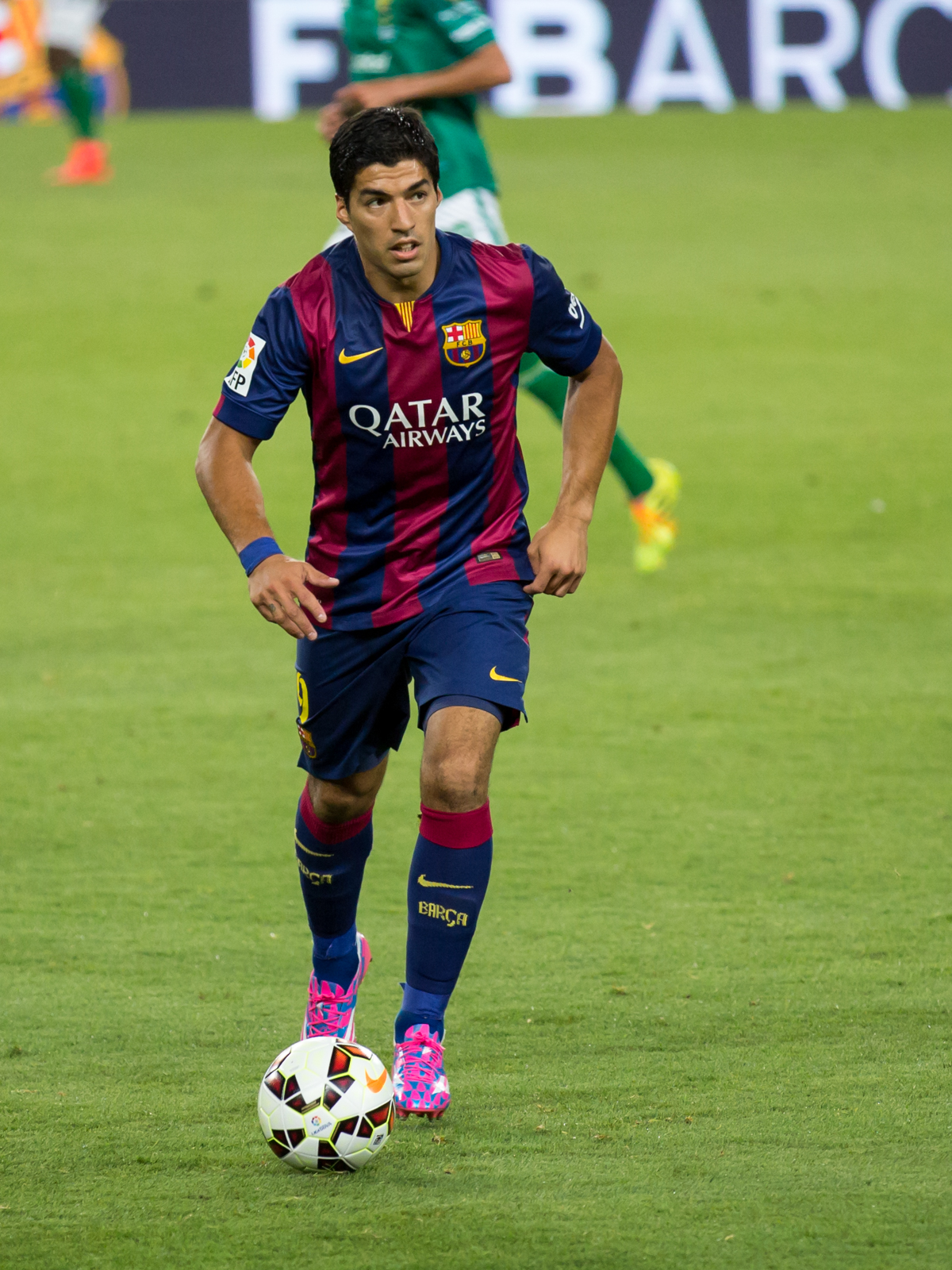
Luis Suárez, the first player to score a hat-trick at the Club World Cup.

No.	Player	Club	Opponent	Goals	Goal times	Score	Tournament	Round	Date	Ref.
1	(Uruguay) Luis Suárez	(Spain) Barcelona	(China) Guangzhou Evergrande	3	39', 50', 67' (pen.)	3–0	2015, Japan	Semi-finals	17 December 2015	
2	(Portugal) Cristiano Ronaldo	(Spain) Real Madrid	(Japan) Kashima Antlers	3	60' (pen.), 98', 104'	4–2 (a.e.t.)	2016, Japan	Final	18 December 2016	
3	(Wales) Gareth Bale	(Spain) Real Madrid	(Japan) Kashima Antlers	3	44', 53', 55'	3–1	2018, United Arab Emirates	Semi-finals	19 December 2018	
4	(Libya) Hamdou Elhouni	(Tunisia) Espérance de Tunis	(Qatar) Al-Sadd	3	6', 42', 74'	6–2	2019, Qatar	Match for fifth place	17 December 2019	
5	(Germany) Jamal Musiala	(Germany) Bayern Munich	(New Zealand) Auckland City	3	67', 73' (pen.), 84'	10–0	2025, United States	Group stage	15 June 2025	
6	(Palestine) Wessam Abou Ali	(Egypt) Al Ahly	(Portugal) Porto	3	15', 45+2' (pen.), 51'	4–4	2025, United States	Group stage	23 June 2025	
